= Diocese of Limoges =

Catholic diocese in France

Coordinates: 45°49′41″N 1°15′53″E

Diocese of Limoges Dioecesis Lemovicensis Diocèse de Limoges

Catholic
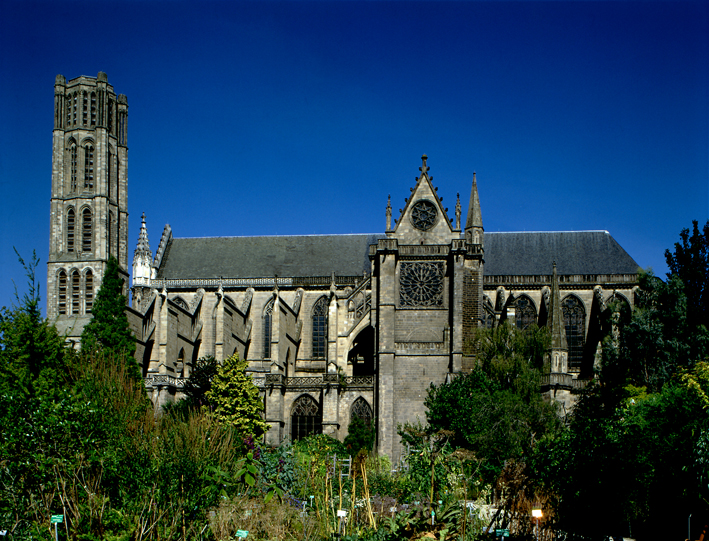
- Limoges Cathedral

Location
- Country: France
- Ecclesiastical province: Poitiers
- Metropolitan: Archdiocese of Poitiers

Statistics
- Area: 11,085 km^{2} (4,280 sq mi)
- Population: Total; Catholics: (as of 2021); 494,885; 406,000 (guess) (82%)
- Parishes: 30

Information
- Denomination: Catholic
- Sui iuris church: Latin Church
- Rite: Roman Rite
- Established: 1st Century
- Cathedral: Cathedral of St. Stephen in Limoges
- Patron saint: Saint Martial
- Secular priests: 52 (Diocesan); 6 (Religious Orders); 24 Permanent Deacons

Current leadership
- Pope: Leo XIV
- Bishop: Benoît Aubert
- Metropolitan Archbishop: Pascal Wintzer

Map

Website
- Official website

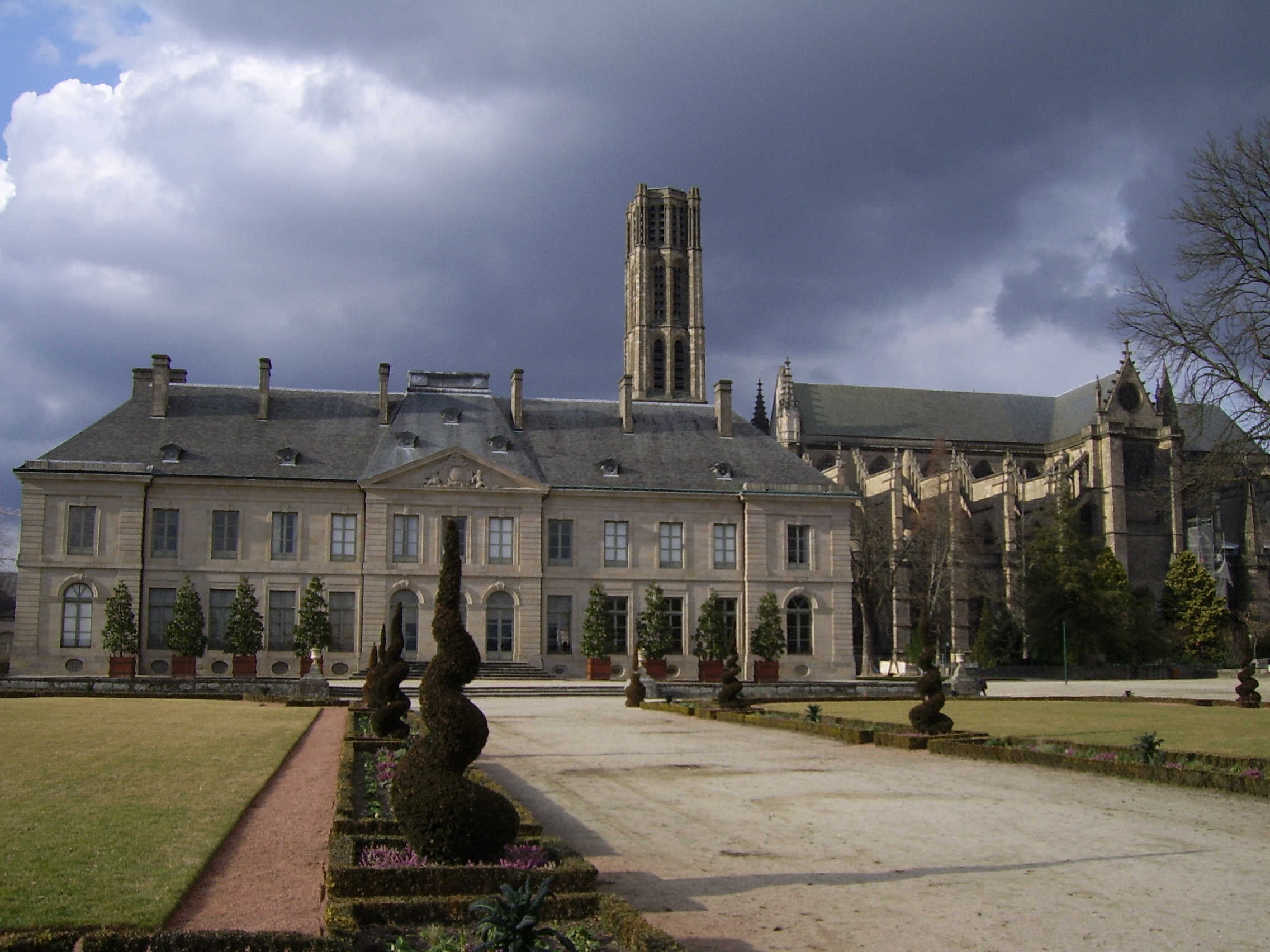
The Episcopal Palace (Limoges)

The Diocese of Limoges (Latin: Dioecesis Lemovicensis; French: Diocèse de Limoges) is a Latin Church diocese of the Catholic Church in France. The diocese comprises the départments of Haute-Vienne and Creuse. After the Concordat of 1801, the See of Limoges lost twenty-four parishes from the district of Nontron which were annexed to the Diocese of Périgueux, and forty-four from the district of Confolens, transferred to the Diocese of Angoulême; but until 1822 it included the entire ancient Diocese of Tulle, when the latter was reorganized.

Since 2002, the diocese has been suffragan to the Archdiocese of Poitiers, after transferral from the Archdiocese of Bourges.

In 2021, in the Diocese of Limoges there was one priest for every 6,766 Catholics.

== Early history ==
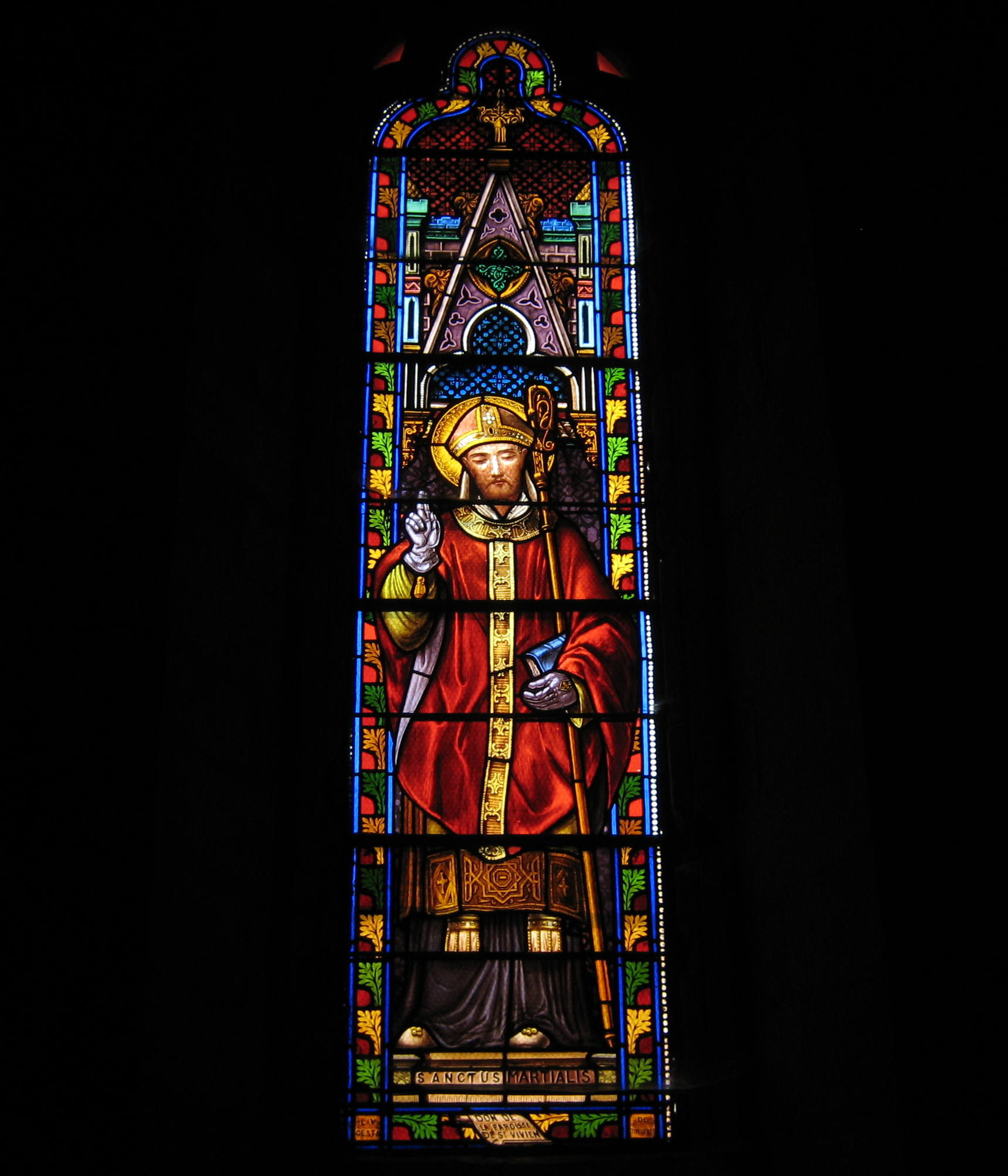
Saint Martial

=== Early Mythology ===
Saint Gregory of Tours names St. Martial, who founded the Church of Limoges, as one of the seven bishops sent from Rome to Gaul in the middle of the 3rd century. An anonymous life of St. Martial (Vita primitiva), discovered and published by Abbé Arbellot, represents him as sent to Gaul by St. Peter. Controversy has arisen over the date of this biography. The discovery in the library at Karlsruhe of a manuscript copy written at Reichenau by Regimbertus, a monk who died in 846, places the original before that date. The biography is written in rhythmical prose; Charles-Félix Bellet thinks it belongs to the 7th century, while Charles De Smedt and Louis Duchesne maintain that the "Vita primitiva" is much later than Gregory of Tours (died 590). Charles Ferdinand de Lasteyrie du Saillant gives 800 as the date of its origin.

In addition to the manuscript already cited, the Abbey of St. Martial at the beginning of the 11th century possessed a circumstantial life of its patron saint, according to which, and to the cycle of later legends derived from it, St. Martial was one of the seventy-two disciples who witnessed the Passion and Ascension of Christ, was present on the first Pentecost and at the martyrdom of St. Stephen. followed St. Peter to Antioch and to Rome, and was sent to Gaul by the Prince of the Apostles, who assigned Austriclinium and Alpinian to accompany him. The three were welcomed at Tulle and turned away from Ahun. They set out towards Limoges, where St. Martial erected on the site of the present cathedral a shrine in honour of St. Stephen. A pagan priest, Aurelian, wished to throw St. Martial into prison, but was struck dead, then brought to life, baptized, ordained and later consecrated bishop by the saint. Aurelian is the patron of the guild of butchers in Limoges. Forty years after the Ascension, Christ appeared to Martial, and announced to him the approach of death. The churches of Limoges celebrate this event on 16 June. After labouring for twenty-eight years as a missionary in Gaul, the saint died at the age of fifty-nine, surrounded by his converts of Poitou, Berry, Auvergne and Aquitaine.

The writer of this "Life" pretends to be Aurelian, St. Martial's disciple and successor in the See of Limoges. Louis Duchesne thinks it not unlikely that the real authorship of this "apocryphal and lying" work should be attributed to the chronicler Adhémar de Chabannes, noted for his fabrications. M. de Lasteyrie however is of the opinion that the Life was written about 955, before the birth of Adhémar. Be that as it may, this "Vita Aureliana" played an important part at the beginning of the 11th century, when the Abbot Hugh (1019–1025) brought before several councils the question of the Apostolic date of St. Martial's mission. Before the Carolingian period there is no trace of the story that St. Martial was sent to Gaul by St. Peter. It did not spread until the 11th century and was revived in the seventeenth by the Carmelite Bonaventure de Saint-Amable, in his voluminous "Histoire de St. Martial". Duchesne and M. de Lasteyrie assert that it cannot be maintained against the direct testimony of St. Gregory of Tours, who places the origin of the Church of Limoges about the year 250.

==== Saintly patrons ====
The diocese specially honours the following: St. Sylvanus (Silvain), a native of Ahun, martyr; St. Adorator disciple of St. Ambrose, suffered martyrdom at Lubersac; St. Victorianus, an Irish hermit; St. Vaast, a native of the diocese who became Bishop of Arras and baptized king Clovis (5th–6th century); St. Psalmodius, a native of Britain, died a hermit at Eymoutiers; St. Yrieix, d. in 591, chancellor to Theudebert II King of Austrasia and founder of the monastery of Attanum (the towns of Saint-Yrieix are named after him); St. Etienne de Muret (1046–1126), who founded the famous Benedictine abbey of Grandmont.

=== Councils of Limoges ===
The Council of Limoges, held in 1031, is noted not only for its decision with regard to St. Martial's mission, but because, at the instigation of Abbot Odolric, it proclaimed the "Truce of God" and threatened with general excommunication those feudal lords who would not swear to maintain it. Another council was held at Limoges by Pope Urban II in December 1095, at which Bishop Humbauld was deposed.

== Middle Ages ==
The Cathedral of St-Étienne was served by a Chapter, composed of three dignities (The Dean, The Precentor, and the Archdeacon), and twenty-nine canons. The Dean held a prebend, as did the Precentor. There was only one Archdeacon in the diocese, the Archdeacon of Limoges (sometimes called the Archdeacon of Malemort). The prebends were assigned by the Chapter, except those which belonged ex officio to the Bishop, the Dean, the Precentor, the Abbot of Benevent and the Prior of Aureil. By the seventeenth century the city of Limoges had a population of around 4,000, divided into two parishes; there was one collège (high school). By 1730 the population had risen to 30,000, and there were twelve urban parishes, but still only one college. In the city there were ten religious houses of men and eight monasteries of monks. The entire diocese was divided up into approximately 1,000 parishes, supervised by seventeen Archpriests.

The ecclesiastics who served the crypt of St. Martial organized themselves into a monastery in 848, and built a church beside that of St.-Pierre-du-Sépulchre which overhung the crypt. This new church, which they called St-Sauveur, was demolished in 1021 and replaced in 1028 by a larger edifice in Auvergnat style. Urban II came in person to reconsecrate it in 1095. In the 13th century the chapel of St. Benedict arose beside the old church of St-Pierre-du-Sépulchre. It was also called the church of the Grand Confraternity of St. Martial. The different organizations which were grouped around it, anticipated and solved many important sociological questions.

In the Middle Ages, Limoges comprised two towns: one called the "City", the other the "Chateau" or "Castle". The government of the "Castle" belonged at first to the Abbots of St. Martial who claimed to have received it from king Louis the Pious. Later, the viscounts of Limoges claimed this authority, and constant friction existed until the beginning of the 13th century, when owing to the new communal activity, consuls were appointed, to whose authority the abbots were forced to submit in 1212. After two intervals during which the English kings imposed their rule, king Charles V of France in 1371 united the "Castle" with the royal demesne, and thus ended the political rule of the Abbey of St. Martial. Until the end of the old regime, however, the abbots of St. Martial exercised direct jurisdiction over the Combes quarter of the city.

In 1370 the city was completely sacked by Prince Edward, the Black Prince, causing a diminution in the size of the population of more than 3,000 persons. The city had been handed over to the French in an act of treachery by the Bishop, Jean de Cros, who had been a personal friend and Councillor of the Black Prince, and when the city was taken, the English revenge was all the more vigorous. Bishop de Cros was captured by the English, and the Prince threatened to have the bishop's head cut off. Only the intervention of the Duke of Lancaster saved Bishop le Cros.

== Early modern period ==
It was at the priory of Bourganeuf in this diocese that Pierre d'Aubusson received the Ottoman prince Zizim, son of Sultan Mehmed II, after he had been defeated in 1483 by his brother, Bayezid II.

In 1534, Abbot Matthieu Jouviond, finding that the monastic spirit had almost totally died out in the abbey of St. Martial, thought best to change it into a collegiate church, and in 1535 King Francis I and Pope Paul III gave their consent. The Collegiate Church was suppressed in 1791, and early in the 19th century even the buildings had disappeared. In the 13th century, the Abbey of St. Martial possessed the finest library (450 volumes) in France after that of Cluny Abbey (570 volumes). Some have been lost, but 200 of them were bought by Louis XV in 1730, and to-day are part of the collections in the Bibliothèque Nationale at Paris. Most manuscripts, ornamented with beautiful miniatures, were written in the abbey itself. M. Émile Molinier and M. Rupin admit a relation between these miniatures of St. Martial and the earliest Limoges enamels, but M. de Lasteyrie disputes this theory. The Franciscans settled at Limoges in 1223.

According to the chronicle of Pierre Coral, rector of St. Martin of Limoges, Anthony of Padua established a convent there in 1226 and departed in the first months of 1227. On the night of Holy Thursday, it is said, he was preaching in the church of St. Pierre du Queyroix, when he stopped for a moment and remained silent. At the same instant he appeared in the choir of the Franciscan monastery and read a lesson. The 1913 Catholic Encyclopedia speculates that the famous apparition of the infant Jesus to Anthony of Padua also occurred in Limoges, at Châteauneuf.

Mention must also be made of the following natives of Limoges: Bernard Guidonis (1261–1313), born at La Roche d'Abeille, Bishop of Lodève and a celebrated canonist; the Aubusson family, one of whom, Pierre d'Aubusson (1483–1503), was Grand Master of the Order of Jerusalem and one of the defenders of Rhodes against the Ottomans; Marc Antoine Muret, called the "Orator of the Popes" (1526–1596). Three popes came from the Diocese of Limoges: Pierre Roger, born at Maumont (today part of the commune of Rosiers-d'Égletons), elected pope in 1342 as Clement VI, died in 1352; Etienne Albert, or Étienne d'Albret, born at Monts, elevated to the papacy in 1352 as Innocent VI, died in 1362. Pierre Roger de Beaufort, nephew of Clement VI, also born at Maumont, reigned as Gregory XI from 1371 till 1378. Maurice Bourdin, Archbishop of Braga (Portugal), antipope for a brief space in 1118, under the name of Gregory VIII, also belonged to this diocese. St. Peter Damian came to Limoges in 1062 as papal legate, to compel the monks to accept the supremacy of the Order of Cluny.

A benefit to Limoges before the Revolution was the appointment of Anne Robert Jacques Turgot as Intendant of the genéralité of Limoges (1761–1774). He managed to get a major reduction in the tax burden of the province, had a new survey completed which made possible a more just imposition of taxes, and replaced the corvée (compulsory labor) with a tax which was used to hire professional road builders, thereby greatly improving communications in the area. In the famine of 1770–1771, he required land owners to relieve the want of the poor. On 10 February 1770, he issued the "Lettre-circulaire aux curés", in which he advised the clergy on the steps which had to be taken to form local charity bureaus. He placed the Bishop of Limoges, Louis-Charles du Plessis d'Argentré, at the head of the bureau of charity in his episcopal city. The bishop and Turgot had been fellow students at the Sorbonne and were friends. Turgot also promoted the growing of the potato, the use of the spinning wheel, and the manufacture of porcelain.

== Since the separation of churches and state in 1905 ==
Before the 1905 French law on the Separation of the Churches and the State, there were in the diocese of Limoges Jesuits, Franciscans, Marists, Oblates of Mary Immaculate and Sulpicians. The principal congregations of women which originated here are the Sisters of the Incarnation founded in 1639, contemplatives and teachers, who were restored in 1807 at Azerables, and have houses in Texas and Mexico. The Sisters of St. Alexis, nursing sisters, founded at Limoges in 1659. The Sisters of St. Joseph, founded at Dorat in February 1841, by Elizabeth Dupleix, who had visited the prisons at Lyons with other pious women since 1805. The Congregation of Our Saviour and the Congregation of the Blessed Virgin, a nursing and teaching congregation founded at la Souterraine, in 1835, by Joséphine du Bourg.

The Sisters of the Good Shepherd (also called 'Marie Thérèse nuns'), nursing sisters and teachers, had their mother-house at Limoges.

In 2016 there were 97 female religious and 10 male religious serving in the Diocese of Limoges, a decline of 47 since 2013.

== Bishops ==
=== To 1000 ===
- Saint Martial, 3rd century
- Saint Aurelian, 3rd century
- Ebulus
- ?
- Alticus
- ?
- Emerinus
- ?
- Hermogenian
- ?
- Adelfius I
- ?
- Dativus 4th century
- Adelfius II 4th century
- Exuperius 4th century
- Astidius 4th century
- Peter du Palais 506
- Ruricius 507
- Ruricius II 535–553
- Exochius 6th century
- Ferreolus 575–597
- Asclepius 613
- Saint Loup 614–631
- Simplicius 7th century
- Felix ca. 650.
- Adelfius III
- Rusticus 669
- Autsindus 683
- Hergenobert 7th century
- Ermenon 8th century
- Salutaris 8th century
- Saint Sacerdos 720
- Ausuindus 8th century
- Agericus
- Saint Cessadre 732.
- Rorice III. 8th century
- Ebulus I. 752–768
- Asclepius ca. 793
- Reginbert 794–817.
- Odoacre 821–843
- Stodilus 850–861
- Aldo 866
- Geilo 869
- Anselm 869–896
- Turpin D'Aubusson 905–944
- Ebalus II 958–963
- Hildegaire 977–990
- Alduin 990–1012

=== 1000 to 1300 ===
- Géraud I 1012–1020
- Jourdain de Laront 1029–1051
- Itier Chabot 1052–1073
- Guy de Laront 1076–1086
- Humbauld de Saint-Sèvère 1087–1095
- Guillaume D'Uriel 1098–1100
- Pierre Viroald 1100–1105
- Eustorge 1106–1137
- Gérald II du Cher 1142–1177
- Sébrand Chabot 1179–1198
- Jean de Veyrac 1198–1218
- Bernard de Savène 1219–1226
- Guy de Cluzel 1226–1235
- [Guillaume du Puy] 1235
- Durand 1240–1245
- Aymeric de La Serre 1246–1272
- Gilbert de Malemort 1275–1294
- Raynaud de La Porte 1294–1316

=== 1300 to 1500 ===
- Gérard Roger 1317–1324
- Hélie de Talleyrand 1324–1328
- Blessed Roger le Fort 1328–1343
- Nicolas de Besse 1343–1344 (never consecrated)
- Guy de Comborn 1346–1347
- Jean de Cros 1347–1371
- Aymeric Chati de L'Age-au-Chapt 1371–1390
- Bernard de Bonneval 1391–1403 (Avignon Obedience)
- Hugues de Magnac 1403–1412
- Ramnulfe de Peyrusse des Cars 1414–1426
- Hugues de Rouffignac 1426–1427
- Pierre de Montbrun 1427–1456
- Jean de Barthon I. 1457–1484
- Jean de Barthon II. 1484–1510

=== 1500 to 1800 ===
- René de Prie 1514–1516
- Philippe de Montmorency 1517–1519
- Charles de Villiers de L`Isle-Adam 1522–1530
- Antoine de Lascaris 1530–1532
- Jean de Langeac 1533–1541
- Jean du Bellay 1541–1544
- Antoine Senguin 1546–1550
- César des Bourguignons 1555–1558
- Sébastien de L'Aubespine 1558–1582
- Jean de L'Aubespine 1582–1587
- Henri de La Marthonie 1587–1618
- Raymond de La Marthonie 1618–1627
- François de Lafayette 1628–1676
- Louis de Lascaris D'Urfé 1676–1695
- François de Carbonel de Canisy 1695–1706, † 1723
- Antoine de Charpin de Genetines (13 Sep 1706 Appointed – 1729 Resigned. 21 Jun 1739 Died)

- Charles de la Roche Aymon (Auxiliary Bishop : 1725–1729)

- Benjamin de l'Isle du Gast (14 August 1730 – 6 September 1739)
- Jean-Gilles du Coëtlosquet (1739–1758)
- Louis-Charles du Plessis d'Argentré (3 Sep 1758 Appointed – 28 Mar 1808 Died)
  - Léonard Gay-Vernon (Constitutional Bishop of Haute-Vienne) (1791–1793)

=== From 1800 ===
- Marie-Jean-Philippe Dubourg (29 Apr 1802 Appointed – 31 Jan 1822 Died)
- Jean-Paul-Gaston de Pins (1822–1824)
- Prosper de Tournefort (13 Oct 1824 Appointed – 7 Mar 1844 Died)
- Bernard Buissas (21 Apr 1844 Appointed – 24 Dec 1856 Died)
- Florian Desprez (4 Feb 1857 Appointed – 30 Jul 1859 Appointed, Archbishop of Toulouse)
- Relix-Pierre Fruchaud (1859–1871)
- Alfred Duquesnay (16 Oct 1871 Appointed – 17 Feb 1881 Appointed Archbishop of Cambrai)
- Pierre Henri Lamazou (17 Feb 1881 Appointed – 3 Jul 1883 Appointed Bishop of Amiens)
- François-Benjamin-Joseph Blanger (3 Jul 1883 Appointed – 11 Dec 1887 Died)
- Firmin-Léon-Joseph Renouard (28 Feb 1888 Appointed – 30 Nov 1913 Died)
- Hector-Raphaël Quilliet (24 Dec 1913 Appointed – 18 Jun 1920 Appointed Bishop of Lille)
- Alfred Flocard (16 Dec 1920 Appointed – 3 Mar 1938 Died)
- Louis-Paul Rastouil (21 Oct 1938 Appointed – 7 Apr 1966 Died)
- Henri Gufflet † (7 Apr 1966 Succeeded – 13 Jul 1988 Retired)
- Léon-Raymond Soulier (13 Jul 1988 Succeeded – 24 Oct 2000 Retired – 25 December 2016 Died)
- Christophe Dufour (24 Oct 2000 Appointed – 20 May 2008 Appointed Bishop of Aix en Provence)
- François Michel Pierre Kalist (17 May 2009 – 20 Sept 2016 Appointed Bishop of Clermont-Ferrand)
- Pierre-Antoine Bozo (10 April 2017 Appointed – 19 August 2025 Appointed Bishop Coadjutor of La Rochelle )
- Benoît Aubert (8 April 2026 Appointed)

== Pilgrimages and Feasts ==
In 994, when the district was devastated by a plague (mal des ardents), the epidemic ceased immediately after a procession ordered by Bishop Hilduin on the Mont de la Joie, which overlooks the city. The Church of Limoges celebrates this event on 12 November.

The principal pilgrimages of the diocese are those of: Saint Valéric at Saint-Vaury (6th century); Our Lady of Sauvagnac at Saint-Léger-la-Montagne (12th century); Notre-Dame-du-Pont, near Saint-Junien (14th century), twice visited by Louis XI; Notre-Dame d'Arliquet, at Aixe-sur-Vienne (end of the 16th century); Notre-Dame-des-Places, at Crozant (since 1664).

== See also ==
- Catholic Church in France

== Bibliography ==
=== Studies ===
- Arbellot, François (1852). Cathédrale de Limoges: histoire et description (in French). Paris: V. Didron.
- Arbellot, François (1855). Dissertation sur l'apostolat de saint Martial et sur l'antiquité des églises de France (in French). Victor Didron. p. 44.
- Arbellot, François (1891). Livre des miracles de Saint Martial: texte latin inédit du IXe siècle (in French and Latin). Limoges: Impr. Ve H. Ducourtieux.
- Bellet, Charles-Félix (1898). Saint Martial, apôtre de Limoges (in French). Limoges: Impr. de P. Dumont.
- Aubrun, Michel (1981). L'ancien diocèse de Limoges des origines au milieu du XIe siècle (in French). Clermont-Ferrand: Presses Univ Blaise Pascal. ISBN 978-2-87741-020-5.
- Barny de Romanet, J.A.A. (2015). "Section III". Histoire de Limoges et du haut et bas Limousin: Mise en harmonie avec les points les plus curieux de l'histoire de France sous le rapport des moeurs et des coutumes (in French). Cork IR: Editions Ligaran-Primento Digital Publishing. ISBN 978-2-335-05000-4.
- Becquet, Jean, ed. (1999). Actes des évêques de Limoges: des origines à 1197. Groupe de recherches pour l'édition des actes des évêques de France (in French and Latin). Paris: Éditions du Centre National de la Recherche Scientifique. ISBN 978-2-271-05645-0.
- Duchesne, Louis (1910). Fastes épiscopaux de l'ancienne Gaule: II. L'Aquitaine et les Lyonnaises. Paris: Fontemoing.
- Grenier, Paul Louis (1907). La cité de Limoges: son évêque, son chapitre, son consulat (XIIe-XVIIIe siècles) ... (in French). Paris: Picard.
- Lasteyrie du Saillant, Charles Ferdinand de (1901). L'abbaye de Saint-Martial de Limoges: étude historique, économique et archéologique, préced́ée de recherches nouvelles sur la vie du saint (in French). Paris: A. Picard et fils.
- Jean, Armand (1891). Les évêques et les archevêques de France depuis 1682 jusqu'à 1801 (in French). Paris: A. Picard.
- Lecler, André (1892). Martyrs et confesseurs de la foi du diocèse de Limoges pendant la Révolution française (in French). Vol. Tome premier (of 4). Limoges: H. Ducourtieux.
- Pisani, Paul (1907). Répertoire biographique de l'épiscopat constitutionnel (1791-1802) (in French). Paris: A. Picard et fils.
- Société bibliographique (France) (1907). L'épiscopat français depuis le Concordat jusqu'à la Séparation (1802-1905). Paris: Librairie des Saints-Pères.

=== Reference works ===
- Gams, Pius Bonifatius (1873). Series episcoporum Ecclesiae catholicae: quotquot innotuerunt a beato Petro apostolo. Ratisbon: Typis et Sumptibus Georgii Josephi Manz. pp. 548–549. (Use with caution; obsolete)
- Eubel, Conradus, ed. (1913). Hierarchia catholica, Tomus 1 (second ed.). Münster: Libreria Regensbergiana. p. 301. (in Latin)
- Eubel, Conradus, ed. (1914). Hierarchia catholica, Tomus 2 (second ed.). Münster: Libreria Regensbergiana. p. 175.
- Eubel, Conradus, ed. (1923). Hierarchia catholica, Tomus 3 (second ed.). Münster: Libreria Regensbergiana.
- Gauchat, Patritius (Patrice) (1935). Hierarchia catholica IV (1592-1667). Münster: Libraria Regensbergiana. p. 219.
- Jouanna, Arlette (1998). "L'Aubespine". In Jouanna, Arlette; Boucher, Jacqueline; Biloghi, Dominique; Le Thiec, Guy (eds.). Histoire et Dictionnaire des Guerres de Religion.
- Ritzler, Remigius; Sefrin, Pirminus (1952). Hierarchia catholica medii et recentis aevi V (1667-1730). Patavii: Messagero di S. Antonio.
- Ritzler, Remigius; Sefrin, Pirminus (1958). Hierarchia catholica medii et recentis aevi VI (1730-1799). Patavii: Messagero di S. Antonio.
- Ritzler, Remigius; Sefrin, Pirminus (1968). Hierarchia Catholica medii et recentioris aevi sive summorum pontificum, S. R. E. cardinalium, ecclesiarum antistitum series... A pontificatu Pii PP. VII (1800) usque ad pontificatum Gregorii PP. XVI (1846) (in Latin). Vol. VII. Monasterii: Libr. Regensburgiana.
- Remigius Ritzler; Pirminus Sefrin (1978). Hierarchia catholica Medii et recentioris aevi... A Pontificatu PII PP. IX (1846) usque ad Pontificatum Leonis PP. XIII (1903) (in Latin). Vol. VIII. Il Messaggero di S. Antonio.
- Pieta, Zenon (2002). Hierarchia catholica medii et recentioris aevi... A pontificatu Pii PP. X (1903) usque ad pontificatum Benedictii PP. XV (1922) (in Latin). Vol. IX. Padua: Messagero di San Antonio. ISBN 978-88-250-1000-8.
- Sainte-Marthe, Denis de (1720). Gallia Christiana, In Provincias Ecclesiasticas Distributa (in Latin). Vol. Tomus secundus. Paris: Ex Typographia Regia. pp. 499–660, Instrumenta, pp. 162–204.
- Pouillé général, contenant les bénéfices appartenans à la nomination au collaboration du Roy (in French). Paris: Chez Gervais Alliot. 1648. pp. separately numbered, ca.p. 216.
