= Molinier =

Molinier is a surname, and may refer to:

- Auguste Molinier (1851–1904), French historian
- Émile Molinier (1857–1906), younger brother of the former, curator and art historian
- Madeleine Molinier (née Monin) (1898–1976), French scientist and nurse who worked with Marie Curie at the Radium Institute in Paris
- Pierre Molinier (1900–1976), French painter, photographer and "maker of objects"
- Raymond Molinier (1904–1994), French communist politician

== See also ==
- Molinier (baritone), stage name of opera singer François Gély (1807–1859)
