= Gérard du Cher =

Former bishop of Limoges

Gérard (or Gérald) du Cher (died 1177), numbered Gerald II, was the bishop of Limoges from 1142 until his death. Born into the lower nobility, he succeeded his uncle, Eustorge de Scorailles, as bishop. Five years elapsed between Eustorge's death in 1137 and Gérard's election. He was selected by the cathedral chapter in an election free of outside interference.

In 1158, Gérard founded a hospital in Limoges dedicated to Gerald of Aurillac. In 1167, he canonised Stephen of Muret (died 1124), the founder of Grandmont Abbey; Stephen was also canonised by the pope in 1189.
