= André Dufraisse =

French cyclist (1926–2021)

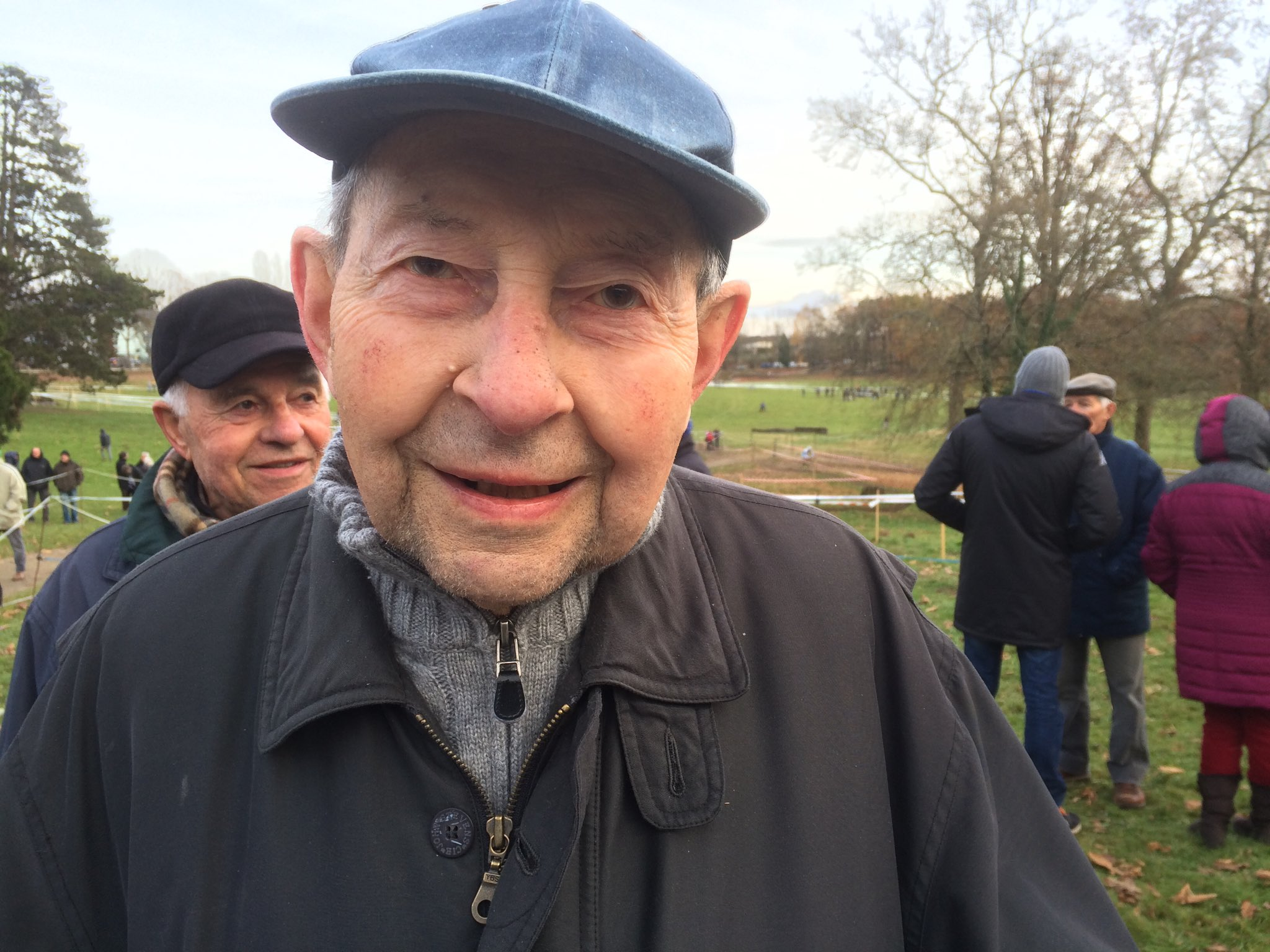
- Dufraisse at 91 in 2017

Personal information
- Born: 30 June 1926 Razès, France
- Died: 21 February 2021 (aged 94) Limoges, France

Cycling career
- Sport: Cycling
- Disciplines: Cyclo-cross; Road
- Role: Rider

Professional teams
- 1950–1953: Rochet–Dunlop
- 1953–1956: Terrot–Hutchinson
- 1956–1964: Saint-Raphaël–R. Geminiani–Dunlop
Medal record
Representing France
Men's cyclo-cross
World Championships
Gold medal – first place	1954 Crenna	Elite race
Gold medal – first place	1955 Saarbrücken	Elite race
Gold medal – first place	1956 Luxembourg	Elite race
Gold medal – first place	1957 Edelare	Elite race
Gold medal – first place	1958 Limoges	Elite race
Silver medal – second place	1951 Luxembourg	Elite race
Silver medal – second place	1952 Geneva	Elite race
Bronze medal – third place	1953 Quato	Elite race
Bronze medal – third place	1961 Hanover	Elite race
Bronze medal – third place	1962 Esch-sur-Alzette	Elite race
Bronze medal – third place	1963 Calais	Elite race

André Dufraisse (French pronunciation: [ɑ̃dʁe dyfʁɛs]; 30 June 1926 – 21 February 2021) was a French cyclo-cross cyclist, who competed professionally from 1950 to 1964.

== Career ==
Dufraisse won the World Cyclo-cross Championships five times from 1954 to 1958, and was the French national champion seven times between 1955 and 1963. Dufraisse switched to cyclo-cross after finishing second in the 1953 world championship, and from then on dominated the sport - in 1956 he won 19 of the 20 races he entered.

Dufraisse died in February 2021.
