= Hiberia =

Hiberia is an alternate form of Iberia, and generally refers to the Iberian Peninsula in southwest Europe.

It may also refer to:

- Hiberia, the wife of Ruricius, a Gallo-Roman aristocrat
- Kingdom of Iberia (c. 302 BC–580 AD), in the Caucasus region
- Kartli, a geographic and cultural region in the country of Georgia corresponding roughly to the ancient kingdom's territory
