= Adelfius I (bishop of Limoges) =

Bishop of Limoges

Adelfius I or Adelphius I (born c. 390) was a bishop of Augustoritum (Limoges) in Haute Vienne from c. 420. Through his daughter Leontia, he was the grandfather of St Ruricius.

He was the son of Pontius (Paulinus), a nobleman of Burdigala (Bordeaux) born c. 360, and Anicia, the daughter of Quintus Clodius Hermogenianus Olybrius, one of the Roman consuls for 379, and his wife Turrenia Anicia Juliana. Adelphius's older brother was named Hermogenianus.

== Sources and references ==
- Gregory, Bishop of Tours, Historia Francorum (The History of the Franks) (London, England: Penguin Books, Ltd., 1974).
- Ford Mommaerts-Browne, "A Speculation".
- Sidonius Apollinaris, The Letters of Sidonius (Oxford: Clarendon, 1915) (orig.), pp. clx-clxxxiii; List of Correspondents, Notes, V.ix.1.

Specific
