= Folles =

- Commune
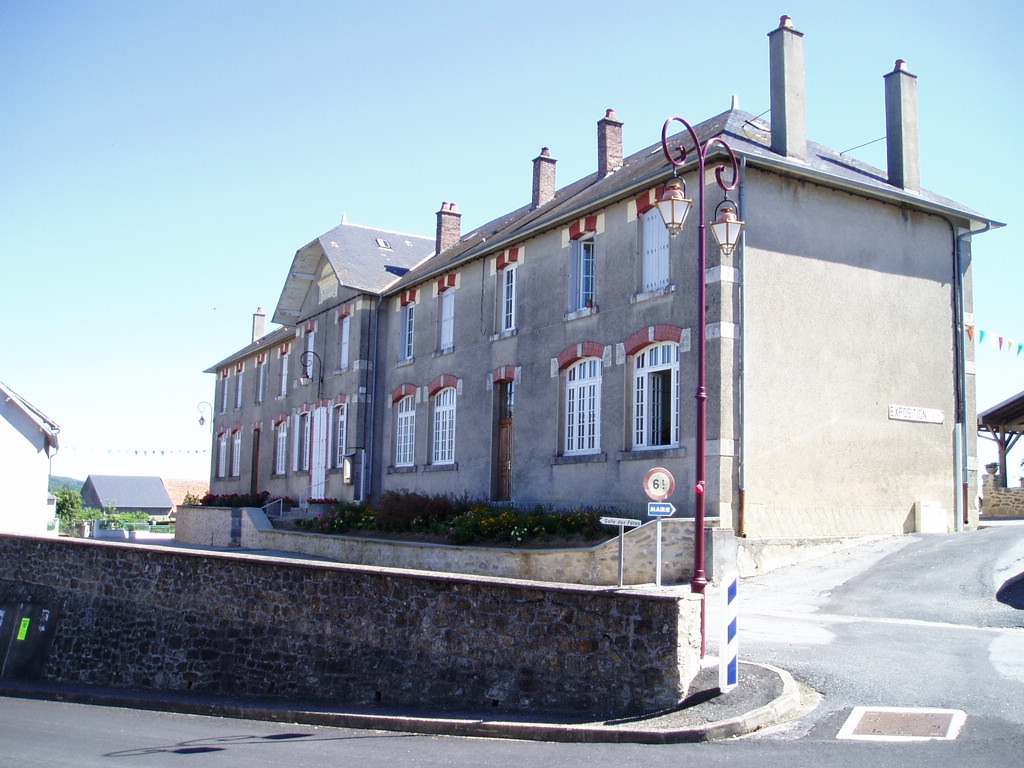
- The town hall in Folles

- Coat of arms
- Location of Folles
- Location within France Location within Nouvelle-Aquitaine
- Coordinates: 46°06′55″N 1°27′42″E
- Country: France
- Region: Nouvelle-Aquitaine
- Department: Haute-Vienne
- Arrondissement: Bellac
- Canton: Ambazac

Government
  - Mayor (2020–2026): Jean-Paul Poulet
- Area^{1}: 31.18 km^{2} (12.04 sq mi)
- Highest elevation: 438 m (1,437 ft)
- Lowest elevation: 277 m (909 ft)
- Population (2023): 439
  - Density: 14.1/km^{2} (36.5/sq mi)
- Time zone: UTC+01:00 (CET)
  - Summer (DST): UTC+02:00 (CEST)
- INSEE/Postal code: 87067 /87250
- ^{1} French Land Register data, which excludes lakes, ponds, glaciers > 1 km^{2} (0.386 sq mi or 247 acres) and river estuaries.

Folles (French pronunciation: [fɔl]; Occitan: Faulas) is a commune in the Haute-Vienne department in the Nouvelle-Aquitaine region in west-central France.

== See also ==
- Communes of the Haute-Vienne department
