= Eustorge de Scorailles =

Eustorge de Scorailles (Latin: Eustorgius) was the bishop of Limoges from 1106 until his death in 1137. He belonged to the local nobility, and was chosen by the cathedral chapter in an election free of outside interference.

Eustorge commissioned the poet Gregory Bechada to write the Canso d'Antioca, a lengthy Occitan poem recounting the First Crusade. This work, relying in part on eyewitness testimony, took twelve years to complete.

Following the disputed Papal election of 1130, Eustorge, a supporter of Innocent II, was expelled from his see by Duke William IX of Aquitaine, who supported Anacletus II. By 1135, Abbot Bernard of Clairvaux had successfully convinced Duke William of Innocent's legitimacy and Eustorge was able to resume his episcopate unimpeded.

Eustorge was succeeded by his nephew, Gérard du Cher (died 1177).

== See also ==
- Catholic Church in France

== Sources ==
- Becquet, Jean (1980). "Les évêques de Limoges aux Xe, XIe et XIIe siècles". Bulletin de la Société Archéologique et Historique du Limousin. 107: 109–41.
- Becquet, Jean (1996). "Religious Life in the Limousin in the Twelfth and Thirteenth Centuries". In Teresa Egan (ed.). Enamels of Limoges, 1100–1350. New York: Metropolitan Museum of Art. pp. 29–32.
- Becquet, Jean (1997). "Actes du vicomte Adémar et de l'évêque Eustorge de Limoges (1107) en faveur de Cublac (Corrèze)". Lemouzi. 141: 95–98.
- Sweetenham, Carol; Edgington, Susan B., eds. (2011). The Chanson d'Antioche: An Old French Account of the First Crusade. Ashgate.
- Walker, David (1982–83). "Crown and Episcopacy under the Normans and Angevins". Anglo-Norman Studies. 5: 220–33.
