= Saint-Sulpice-Laurière =

- Commune
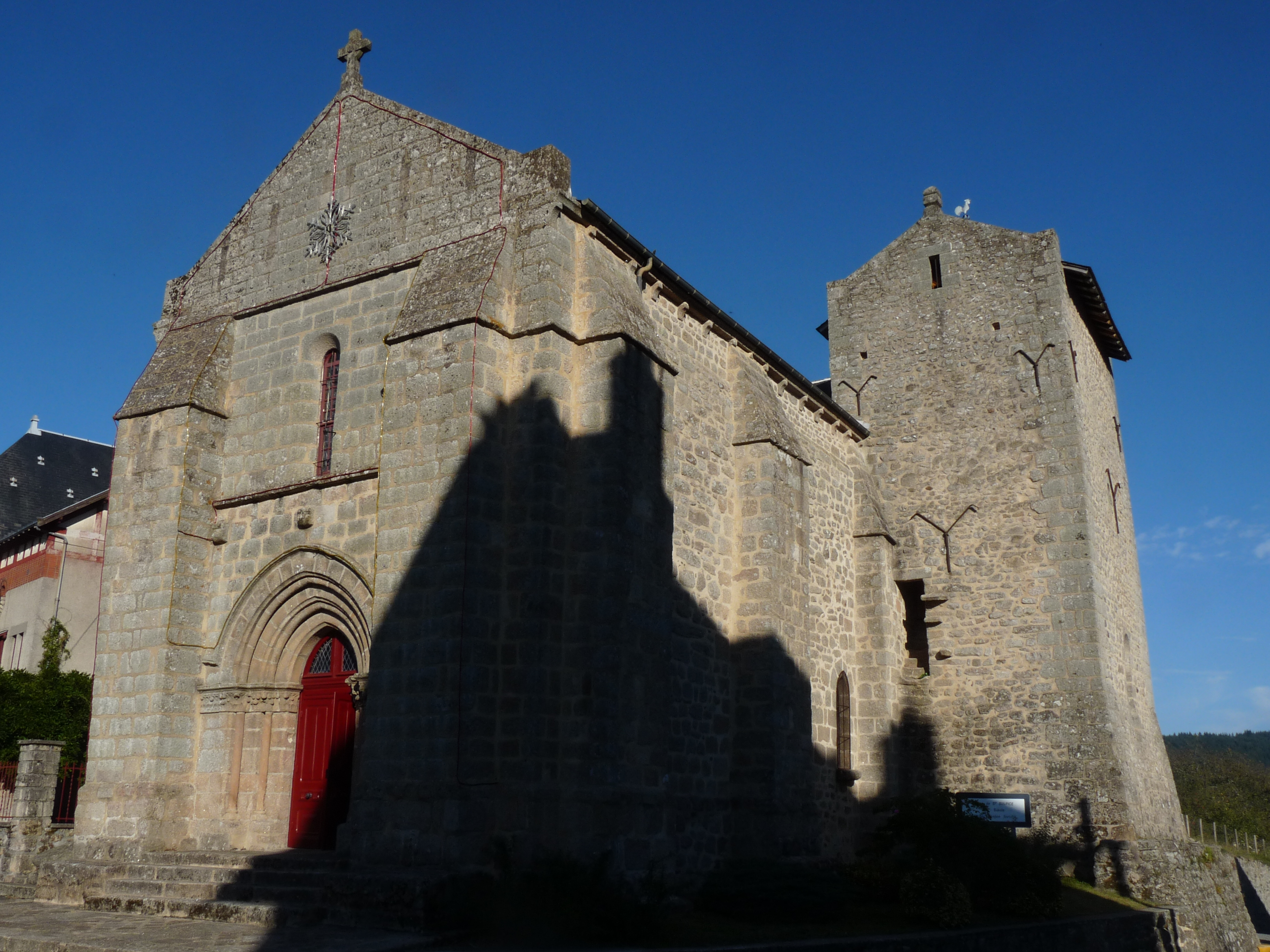
- The 13th century church in Saint-Sulpice-Laurière

- Coat of arms
- Location of Saint-Sulpice-Laurière
- Location within France Location within Nouvelle-Aquitaine
- Coordinates: 46°03′13″N 1°28′18″E
- Country: France
- Region: Nouvelle-Aquitaine
- Department: Haute-Vienne
- Arrondissement: Limoges
- Canton: Ambazac

Government
  - Mayor (2020–2026): Jean-Michel Peyrot
- Area^{1}: 14.31 km^{2} (5.53 sq mi)
- Highest elevation: 623 m (2,044 ft)
- Lowest elevation: 332 m (1,089 ft)
- Population (2023): 792
  - Density: 55.3/km^{2} (143/sq mi)
- Time zone: UTC+01:00 (CET)
  - Summer (DST): UTC+02:00 (CEST)
- INSEE/Postal code: 87181 /87370
- ^{1} French Land Register data, which excludes lakes, ponds, glaciers > 1 km^{2} (0.386 sq mi or 247 acres) and river estuaries.

Saint-Sulpice-Laurière (French pronunciation: [sɛ̃ sylpis loʁjɛʁ]; Occitan: Sent Superis) is a commune in the Haute-Vienne department in the Nouvelle-Aquitaine region in west-central France.

Inhabitants are known as Saint-Sulpiciens.

== See also ==
- Communes of the Haute-Vienne department
