= 1962 UCI Cyclo-cross World Championships =

Cyclo-cross championship

- Venue: Luxembourg, Luxembourg
- Date: 18 February 1962
- Coordinates: 49°29′N 5°59′E
- Cyclists participating: 36
- Events: 1

The 1962 UCI Cyclo-cross World Championships were held in Esch-sur-Alzette, Luxembourg on Sunday February 18, 1962. It was the 13th edition of the UCI Cyclo-cross World Championships.

The race started and finished at the Stade Émile Mayrisch. From there, participants had to complete six laps of an approximately 3.4 km long course through the city park and up the steep Dieswee to the pavilion on the Gaalgebierg. The total distance of the course was 20.909 km. Italian Renato Longo, the 1959 World Champion won the rainbow jersey a second time.

== Men's Elite ==
RANK	1962 UCI CYCLO-CROSS WORLD CHAMPIONSHIPS	TIME
Gold medal	Renato Longo (ITA)	00:54:15
Silver medal	Maurice Gandolfo (ITA)	+ 2:31
Bronze medal	André Dufraisse (FRA)	+ 2:48
4.	Roger De Clercq (BEL)	+ 3:01
5.	Charly Gaul (LUX)	+ 3:49
6.	Pierre Kumps (BEL)	+ 4:04
7.	André Foucher (FRA)	+ 4:05
8.	Michel Pelchat (FRA)	+ 4:26
9.	Santos Ruíz (ESP)	+ 4:35
10.	Firmin Van Kerrebroeck (BEL)	+ 4:38
