= Craswall Priory =

Monastery in Herefordshire, England

Coordinates: 52.0325°N 3.0606°W

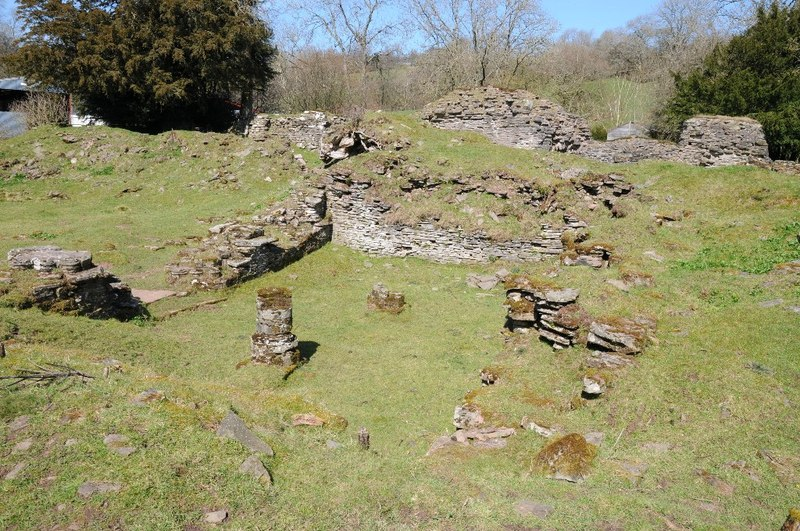
Craswall Priory, 2015.

Craswall Priory was a Grandmontine priory in Herefordshire, England at grid reference SO27253770 dating from 1220 to 1225. The poor condition of the ruins mean that they are on Historic England's Heritage at Risk Register.
