= Canton of Ambazac =

Coordinates: 45.96°N 1.40°E

The canton of Ambazac is an administrative division of the Haute-Vienne department, western France. Its borders were modified at the French canton reorganisation which came into effect in March 2015. Its seat is in Ambazac.

It consists of the following communes:

1. Ambazac
2. Bersac-sur-Rivalier
3. Bessines-sur-Gartempe
4. Les Billanges
5. Bonnac-la-Côte
6. Folles
7. Fromental
8. Jabreilles-les-Bordes
9. La Jonchère-Saint-Maurice
10. Laurière
11. Razès
12. Saint-Laurent-les-Églises
13. Saint-Léger-la-Montagne
14. Saint-Sulpice-Laurière
15. Saint-Sylvestre
