= Arboretum de la Jonchère =

Arboretum in Haute-Vienne, Limousin, France

Coordinates: 46.0000°N 1.4686°E

The Arboretum de la Jonchère (6 hectares) is an arboretum located in Le Bourg, near La Jonchère-Saint-Maurice, Haute-Vienne, Limousin, France. It is open daily without charge.

The arboretum was first established in 1885 as a forestry nursery by Henri Gérardin and André Laurent, primarily of oak, larch, and fir, with plantings resumed in 1937, and further arboretum plantings from 1940 to 1945. At present the arboretum is state-owned and managed by the Office National des Forêts. It began active expansion in 1996 with new collections added in response to the severe storm of 1999, and now contains over 60 labeled tree species including hundred-year-old specimens of calocedrus, sequoia, and taxodium.

== See also ==
- List of botanical gardens in France
