= Stephen of Muret =

French Roman Catholic saint

Saint Stephen of Muret
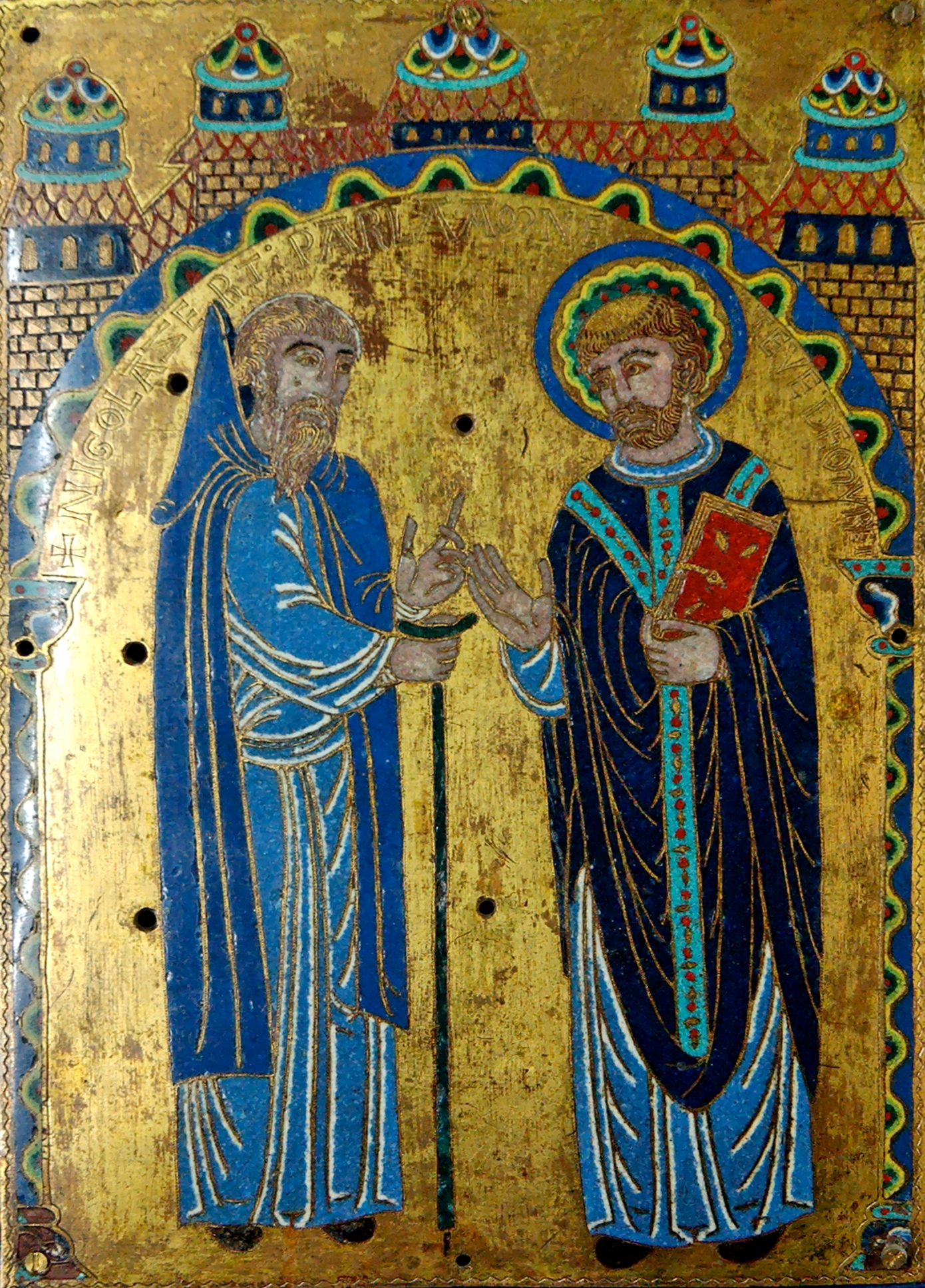
- St. Stephen of Muret and Hugh of Lacerta, plaque from the high altar of the Abbey of Grandmont, 12th century (Musée de Cluny)
- Born: 1045; Thiers, Auvergne, France
- Died: 8 February 1124 (aged 78–79)
- Venerated in: Catholic Church
- Canonized: 1189 by Pope Clement III
- Major shrine: parish Church of St. Sylvestre, Laurière, France.
- Feast: 8 February

Stephen of Muret (French: Étienne de Muret) (1045 – 8 February 1124) was the founder of the Order of Grandmont and its motherhouse of Grandmont Abbey.

== Hagiography ==
Serious chronological difficulties are presented by the traditional story of his early life (printed in Patrologia Latina 204, coll. 1005–1072), which runs as follows: Stephen in his twelfth year accompanied his father, the Viscount of Thiers, to Italy, where he was left to be educated by Milo, Archbishop of Benevento; after passing twelve years in this prelate's household, he became acquainted with hermits in Calabria, but never joined their way of life. He then returned to France to bid farewell to his parents, having formed the design of entering religion, but finding them dead, returned to Italy.

Having also lost his patron, Milo, he established himself in Rome, where he studied the rules of the city's religious houses. After a four-year sojourn, he obtained a papal bull from Pope Gregory VII authorizing him to found an institute resembling those of solitaries he had frequented in Calabria, and returned to France. He is said to have settled at Muret in 1076 and died there on 8 February 1124. By then, he had established the Order of Grandmont, a religious order of "extreme austerity and poverty."

This story is impossible; his father visited Italy to make a pilgrimage to Nicholas of Myra at Bari; but Nicholas's relics were not placed there until some years later; Milo was not Archbishop of Benevento for twelve years; and Gregory VII's bull is a forgery. The exact truth behind Saint Stephen's life cannot now be established. However, the connexions with Milo, whose short episcopate (1074–75) would argue against any later invention by a biographer; the connexion, too, with Benevento, which held particular interest for reforming popes; and the lack of miracles during his life, would all argue for at least some details being historically sound. The Life would seem to have been originally written in the mid-twelfth century and to have been revised in the last decade of that century.

The quarrel as to which great order could claim Grandmont as its offspring, with the consequent forgeries, has done much to involve the founder's life in obscurity. Though Stephen was certainly the founder of the Grandmontines, he did little for his disciples except offer them the example of his holy life, and it was not till after his death that the Order was firmly established.

== Veneration ==
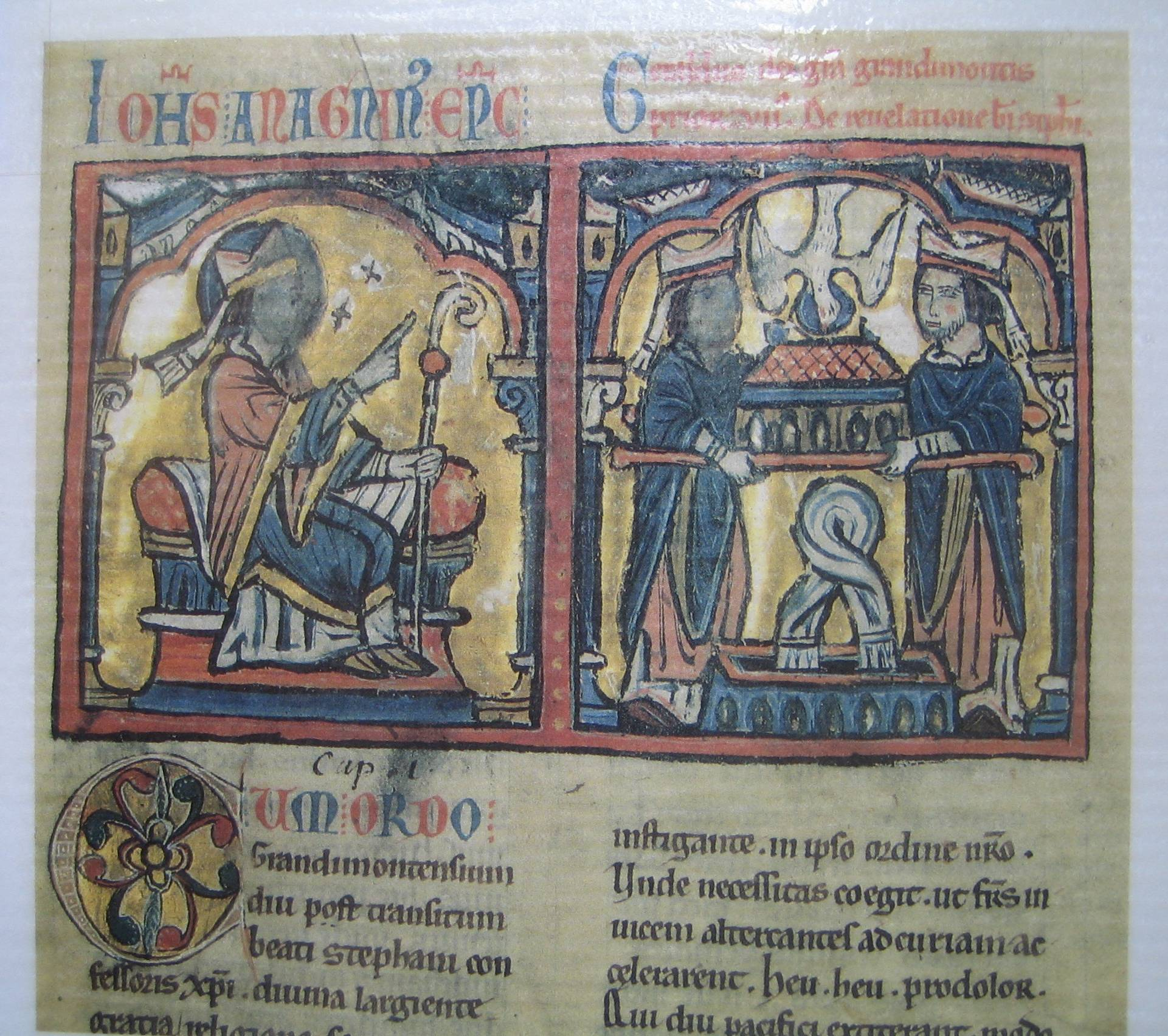
Two miniatures from the 13th Speculum Grandimontis, Clement III depicts Stephen of Muret and the translation of his remains, respectively

His head relic is enshrined in the parish Church of Saint Sylvestre, of the canton of Laurière in the Haute Vienne département.

He was canonized by Bishop Gerald II of Limoges in 1167, and by Pope Clement III in 1189. His feast day is on 8 February.

== See also ==
- Chronological list of saints and blesseds in the 12th century
- Grandmontines

== Sources ==
- His works (not authentic) may be found in Migne, P. L. CCIV, 997–1162.
