= Renato Longo =

Italian cyclist (1937–2023)

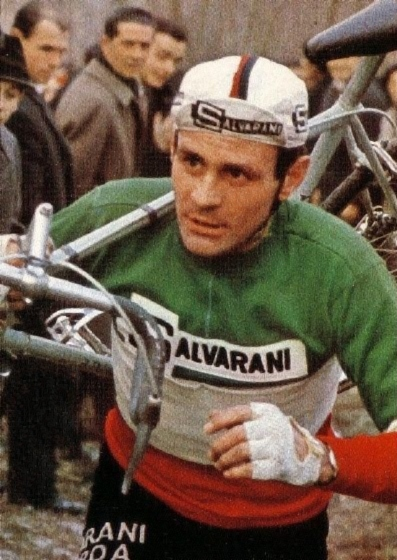
- Longo before 1972

Personal information
- Born: 9 August 1937 Vittorio Veneto, Italy
- Died: 8 June 2023 (aged 85) Conegliano, Italy

Cycling career
- Sport: Cycling
- Current team: Retired
- Discipline: Cyclo-cross
- Role: Rider

Professional team
- 1960–1972: Salvarani

Major wins
- Cyclo-cross World Champion (1959, 1962, 1964, 1965 and 1967); Italian Cyclo-Cross champion (1959–1960, 1962, 1964–1972)
Medal record
Representing Italy
Men's cyclo-cross
World Championships
Gold medal – first place	1959 Geneva	Elite
Gold medal – first place	1962 Esch-sur-Alzette	Elite
Gold medal – first place	1964 Overboelare	Elite
Gold medal – first place	1965 Cavaria	Elite
Gold medal – first place	1967 Zürich	Elite
Silver medal – second place	1961 Hanover	Elite
Silver medal – second place	1963 Calais	Elite
Bronze medal – third place	1969 Magstadt	Elite

Renato Longo (9 August 1937 – 8 June 2023) was an Italian cyclo-cross racer. Longo won the World Cyclo-cross Championships five times in 1959, 1962, 1964, 1965 and 1967 and was the Italian Cyclo-cross champion 12 times.

== Biography ==
Longo competed as a professional from 1960 to 1972 and for most of his career, he rode with the Salvarani team of Felice Gimondi. Longo's first wins in the World Championships in 1959 and 1962 were obtained after a battle with German Rolf Wolfshohl who won the title ahead of Longo in 1960, 1961 and 1963. In 1964, Wolfshohl focused on road racing and Longo became the master of cyclo-cross until Eric De Vlaeminck arrived – although Longo beat de Vlaeminck for his last world title in 1967. In total he won more than 230 cyclo-cross races in his professional career.

Longo died on 8 June 2023, at the age of 85.

== See also ==
- UCI Hall of Fame
