= Les Billanges =

- Commune
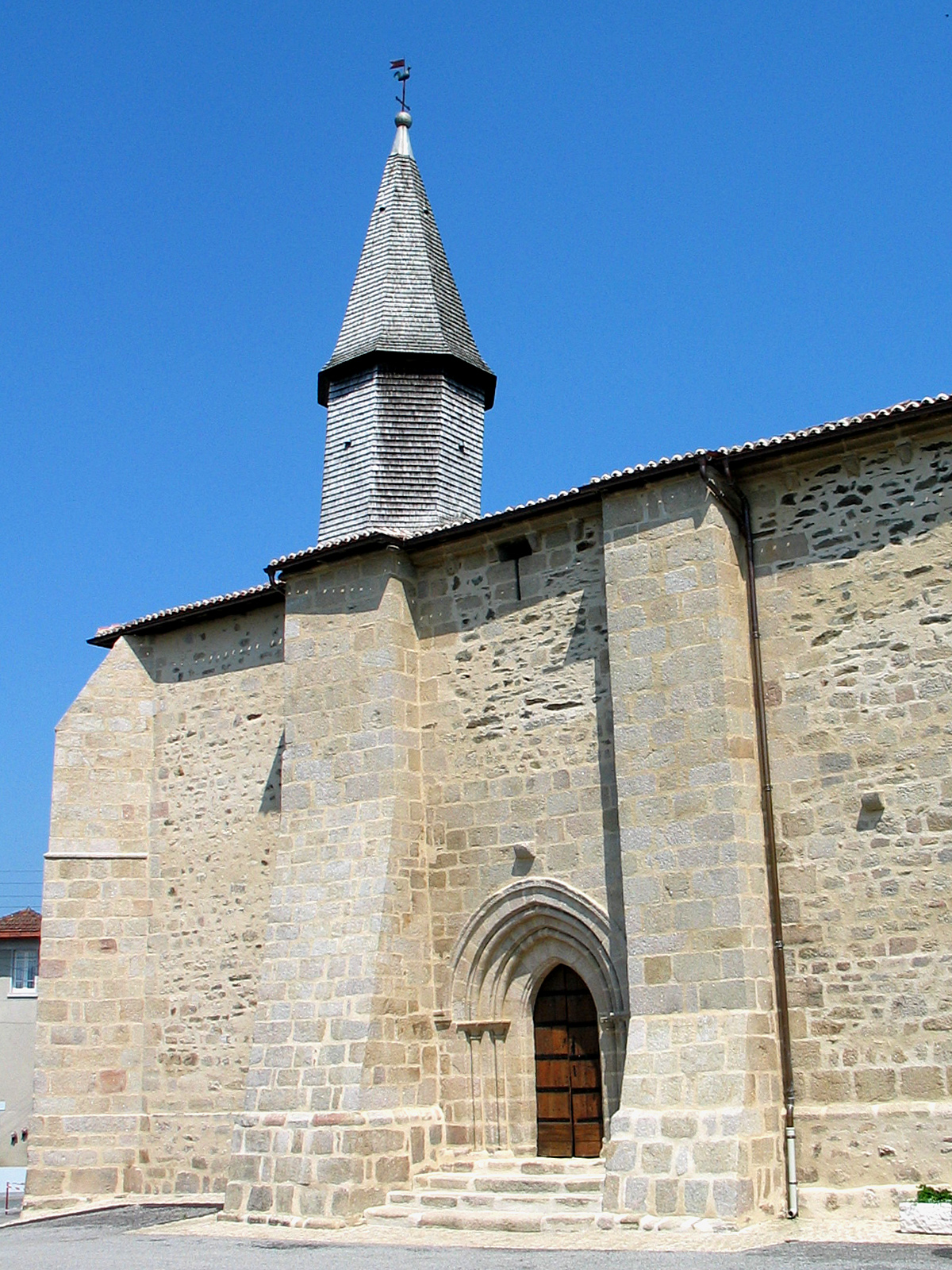
- The church of the Nativity of Saint-Jean-Baptiste, in Les Billanges

- Coat of arms
- Location of Les Billanges
- Location within France Location within Nouvelle-Aquitaine
- Coordinates: 45°57′53″N 1°32′03″E
- Country: France
- Region: Nouvelle-Aquitaine
- Department: Haute-Vienne
- Arrondissement: Limoges
- Canton: Ambazac
- Intercommunality: Élan Limousin Avenir Nature

Government
  - Mayor (2020–2026): Manuel Perthuisot
- Area^{1}: 22.61 km^{2} (8.73 sq mi)
- Highest elevation: 451 m (1,480 ft)
- Lowest elevation: 280 m (920 ft)
- Population (2023): 296
  - Density: 13.1/km^{2} (33.9/sq mi)
- Time zone: UTC+01:00 (CET)
  - Summer (DST): UTC+02:00 (CEST)
- INSEE/Postal code: 87016 /87340
- ^{1} French Land Register data, which excludes lakes, ponds, glaciers > 1 km^{2} (0.386 sq mi or 247 acres) and river estuaries.

Les Billanges (French pronunciation: [le bilɑ̃ʒ]; Occitan: Los Bilanges) is a commune in the Haute-Vienne department in the Nouvelle-Aquitaine region in western France.

Inhabitants are known as Billangeots in French.

== See also ==
- Communes of the Haute-Vienne department
