= Léon-Raymond Soulier =

French prelate

His Excellency Léon-Raymond Soulier
- Bishop Emeritus of Limoges
- Church: Roman Catholic Church
- See: Roman Catholic Diocese of Limoges
- In office: 1988–2000
- Predecessor: Henri Gufflet
- Successor: Christophe Dufour
- Previous post: Bishop of Pamiers (1971–1987)

Orders
- Ordination: 7 September 1947
- Consecration: 12 September 1971 by René Boudon
- Rank: Bishop

Personal details
- Born: 13 January 1924 Le Malzieu-Ville, France
- Died: 25 December 2016 (aged 92) Chirac, Charente, France

Léon-Raymond Soulier (13 January 1924 – 25 December 2016) was a French Prelate of the Catholic Church. Soulier was born in Le Malzieu-Ville. He was ordained a priest on 28 June 1947. Soulier was appointed bishop to the Diocese of Pamiers on 22 June 1971 and consecrated on 12 September 1971. Soulier was appointed Coadjutor Bishop to the Diocese of Limoges on 9 July 1987 and succeeded Henri Gufflet on 13 July 1988. Soulier retired from the Diocese of Limoges on 24 October 2000.
