= Jean-Gilles du Coëtlosquet =

French ecclesiastic and bishop

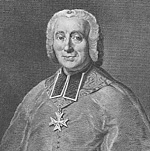
Jean Gilles du Coëtlosquet (1700-1784)

Jean-Gilles du Coëtlosquet (15 September 1700, Saint-Pol-de-Léon – 21 March 1784, Paris) was a French ecclesiastic, bishop of Limoges and preceptor to the grandchildren of Louis XV.

== Biography ==
Chancellor of Bourges, he served as bishop of Limoges from 1739 to 1758 but left behind no written works and little is known of his life. It is known he was a modest and sincerely pious man, which earned him an appointment as preceptor to the duke of Burgundy, who died in 1761 aged 9, then to his brothers, the future Louis XVI, Louis XVIII and Charles X. He was elected a member of the Académie Française in 1761.

He also gave the tonsure to Marmontel.
