= Saint-Laurent-les-Églises =

- Commune
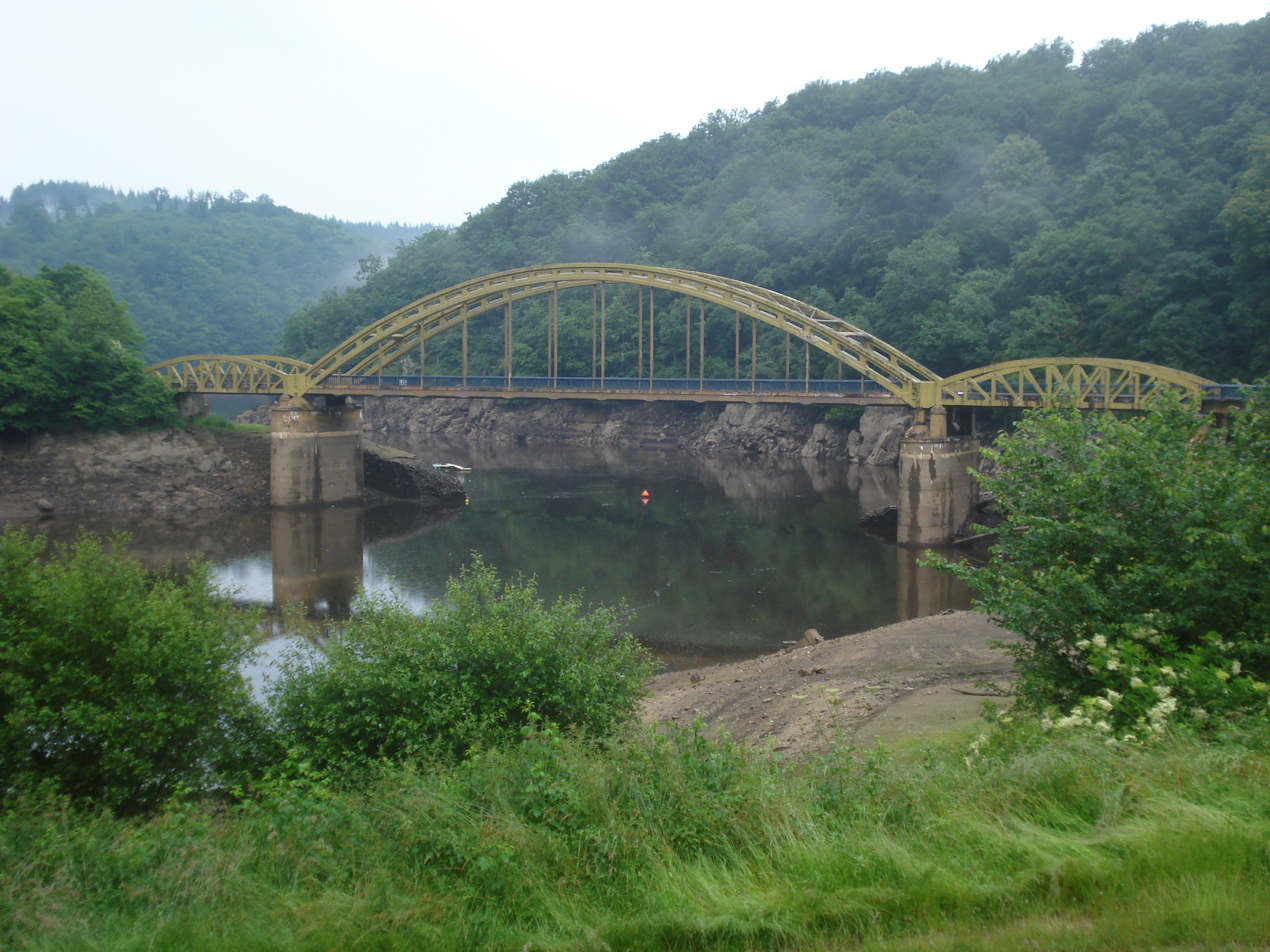
- The Dognon Bridge over the Taurion, linking Saint-Laurent-les-Églises and Le Châtenet-en-Dognon
- Location of Saint-Laurent-les-Églises
- Location within France Location within Nouvelle-Aquitaine
- Coordinates: 45°57′02″N 1°29′55″E
- Country: France
- Region: Nouvelle-Aquitaine
- Department: Haute-Vienne
- Arrondissement: Limoges
- Canton: Ambazac

Government
  - Mayor (2020–2026): Claudine Roux
- Area^{1}: 27.37 km^{2} (10.57 sq mi)
- Highest elevation: 632 m (2,073 ft)
- Lowest elevation: 249 m (817 ft)
- Population (2023): 865
  - Density: 31.6/km^{2} (81.9/sq mi)
- Time zone: UTC+01:00 (CET)
  - Summer (DST): UTC+02:00 (CEST)
- INSEE/Postal code: 87157 /87340
- ^{1} French Land Register data, which excludes lakes, ponds, glaciers > 1 km^{2} (0.386 sq mi or 247 acres) and river estuaries.

Saint-Laurent-les-Églises (French pronunciation: [sɛ̃ loʁɑ̃ le.z‿eɡliz]; Occitan: Sent Laurenç l'Egleisas) is a commune in the Haute-Vienne department in the Nouvelle-Aquitaine region in west-central France.

== See also ==
- Communes of the Haute-Vienne department
