= Saint-Sylvestre, Haute-Vienne =

Saint-Sylvestre
- Commune
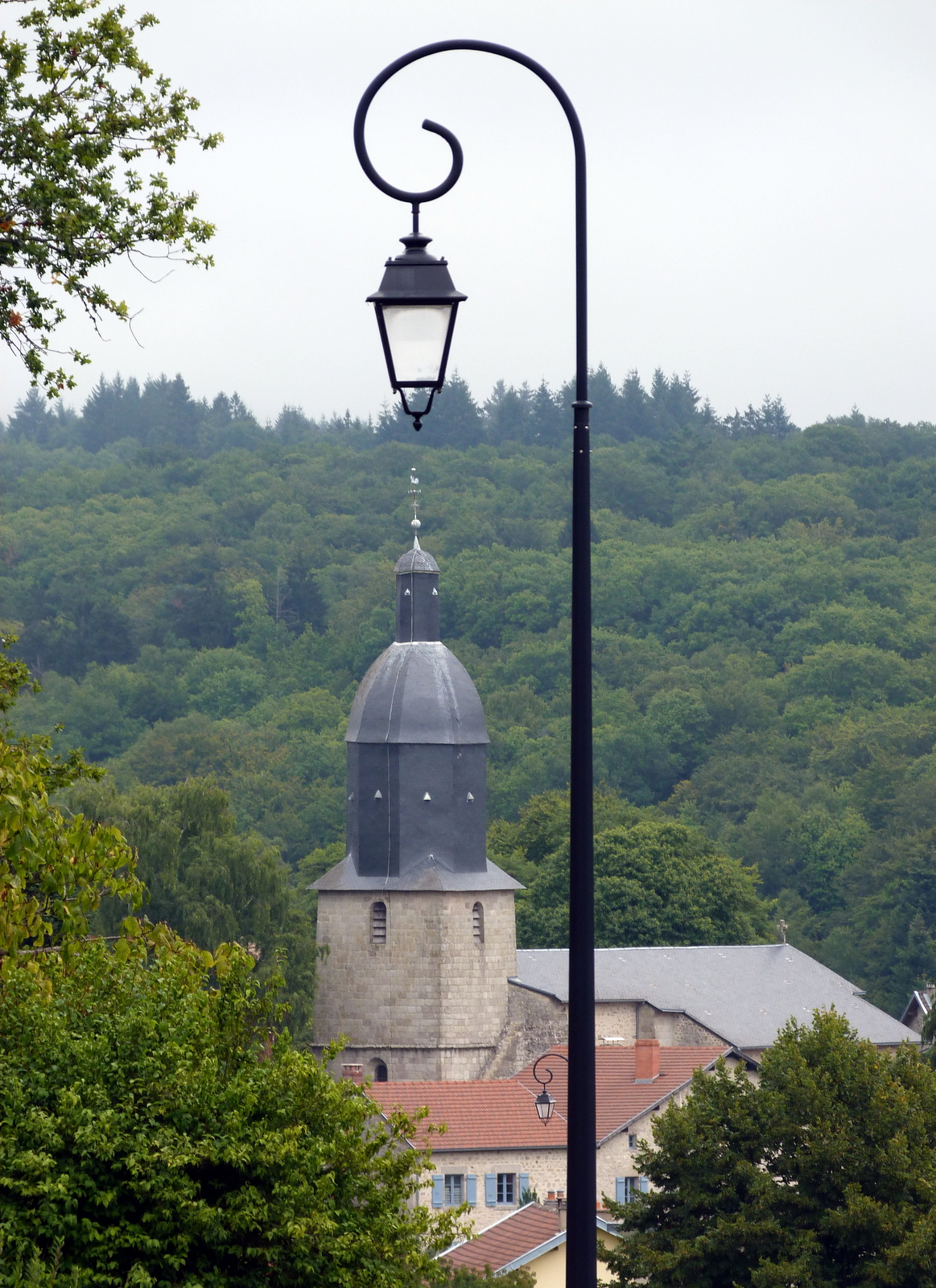
- The church in Saint-Sylvestre
- Location of Saint-Sylvestre
- Location within France Location within Nouvelle-Aquitaine
- Coordinates: 45°59′48″N 1°22′40″E
- Country: France
- Region: Nouvelle-Aquitaine
- Department: Haute-Vienne
- Arrondissement: Limoges
- Canton: Ambazac

Government
  - Mayor (2020–2026): Angélique Terrana
- Area^{1}: 30.91 km^{2} (11.93 sq mi)
- Highest elevation: 651 m (2,136 ft)
- Lowest elevation: 379 m (1,243 ft)
- Population (2023): 922
  - Density: 29.8/km^{2} (77.3/sq mi)
- Time zone: UTC+01:00 (CET)
  - Summer (DST): UTC+02:00 (CEST)
- INSEE/Postal code: 87183 /87240
- ^{1} French Land Register data, which excludes lakes, ponds, glaciers > 1 km^{2} (0.386 sq mi or 247 acres) and river estuaries.

Saint-Sylvestre (French pronunciation: [sɛ̃ silvɛstʁ]; Occitan: Sint Sauvestre) is a commune in the Haute-Vienne department in the Nouvelle-Aquitaine region in west-central France.

== Demography ==
Historical population
Year	Pop.	±% p.a.
1968	696	—
1975	648	−1.02%
1982	660	+0.26%
1990	668	+0.15%
1999	715	+0.76%
2007	828	+1.85%
2012	915	+2.02%
2017	924	+0.20%
2023	922	−0.04%
Source: INSEE

== See also ==
- Grandmontines
- Communes of the Haute-Vienne department
