= La Jonchère-Saint-Maurice =

- Commune
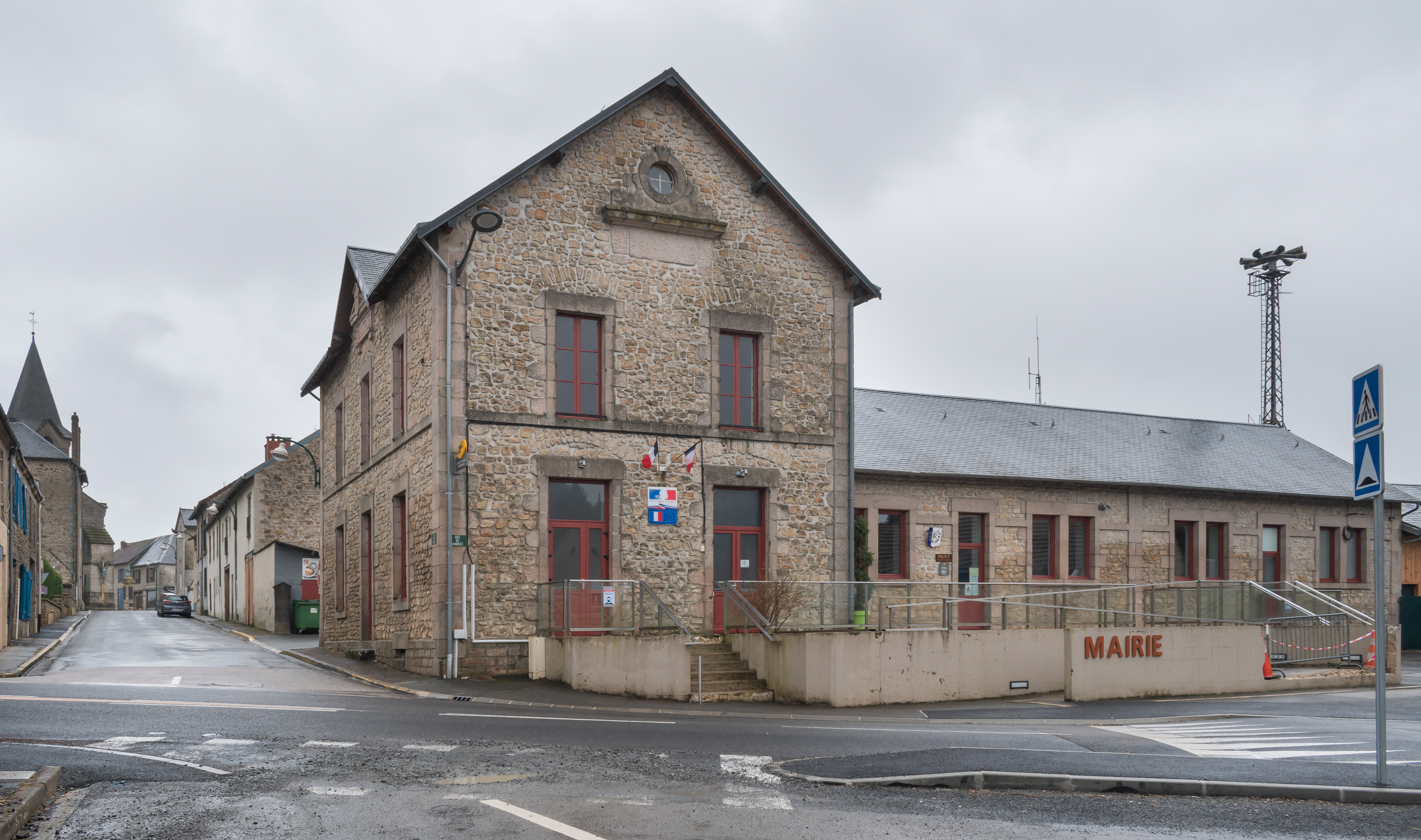
- The town hall in La Jonchère-Saint-Maurice
- Location of La Jonchère-Saint-Maurice
- Location within France Location within Nouvelle-Aquitaine
- Coordinates: 46°00′00″N 1°28′07″E
- Country: France
- Region: Nouvelle-Aquitaine
- Department: Haute-Vienne
- Arrondissement: Limoges
- Canton: Ambazac

Government
  - Mayor (2020–2026): Jean-Marie Horry
- Area^{1}: 15.59 km^{2} (6.02 sq mi)
- Highest elevation: 688 m (2,257 ft)
- Lowest elevation: 346 m (1,135 ft)
- Population (2023): 793
  - Density: 50.9/km^{2} (132/sq mi)
- Time zone: UTC+01:00 (CET)
  - Summer (DST): UTC+02:00 (CEST)
- INSEE/Postal code: 87079 /87340
- ^{1} French Land Register data, which excludes lakes, ponds, glaciers > 1 km^{2} (0.386 sq mi or 247 acres) and river estuaries.

La Jonchère-Saint-Maurice (French pronunciation: [la ʒɔ̃ʃɛʁ sɛ̃ mɔʁis]; Occitan: La Junchera) is a commune in the Haute-Vienne department in the Nouvelle-Aquitaine region in west-central France.

Inhabitants are known as Jonchérois.

== Points of interest ==
- Arboretum de la Jonchère

== See also ==
- Communes of the Haute-Vienne department
