= Saint-Léger-la-Montagne =

- Commune
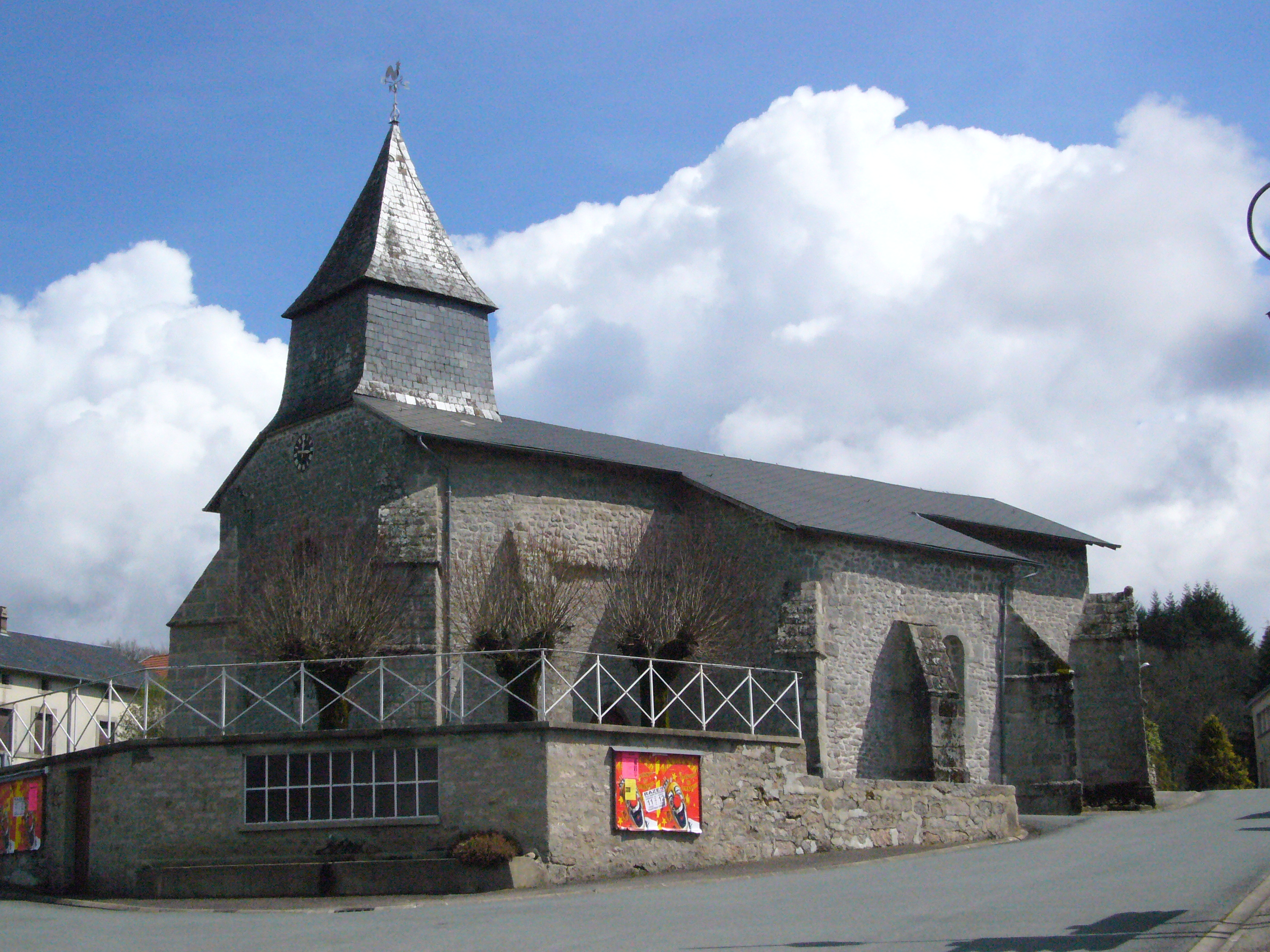
- The church in Saint-Léger-la-Montagne
- Location of Saint-Léger-la-Montagne
- Location within France Location within Nouvelle-Aquitaine
- Coordinates: 46°01′50″N 1°25′12″E
- Country: France
- Region: Nouvelle-Aquitaine
- Department: Haute-Vienne
- Arrondissement: Limoges
- Canton: Ambazac

Government
  - Mayor (2020–2026): Gisèle Jouannetaud
- Area^{1}: 32.62 km^{2} (12.59 sq mi)
- Highest elevation: 701 m (2,300 ft)
- Lowest elevation: 418 m (1,371 ft)
- Population (2023): 362
  - Density: 11.1/km^{2} (28.7/sq mi)
- Time zone: UTC+01:00 (CET)
  - Summer (DST): UTC+02:00 (CEST)
- INSEE/Postal code: 87159 /87340
- ^{1} French Land Register data, which excludes lakes, ponds, glaciers > 1 km^{2} (0.386 sq mi or 247 acres) and river estuaries.

Saint-Léger-la-Montagne (French pronunciation: [sɛ̃ leʒe la mɔ̃taɲ]; Occitan: Sent Legèr) is a commune in the Haute-Vienne department in the Nouvelle-Aquitaine region in west-central France.

Inhabitants are known as Saint-Légeois in French.

== See also ==
- Communes of the Haute-Vienne department
