= Church of St. Pierre du Queyroix =

Church in Limoges, France

- Église Saint-Pierre-du-Queyroix (French); Egleisa de Sent Peire dau Cairoi (Occitan)
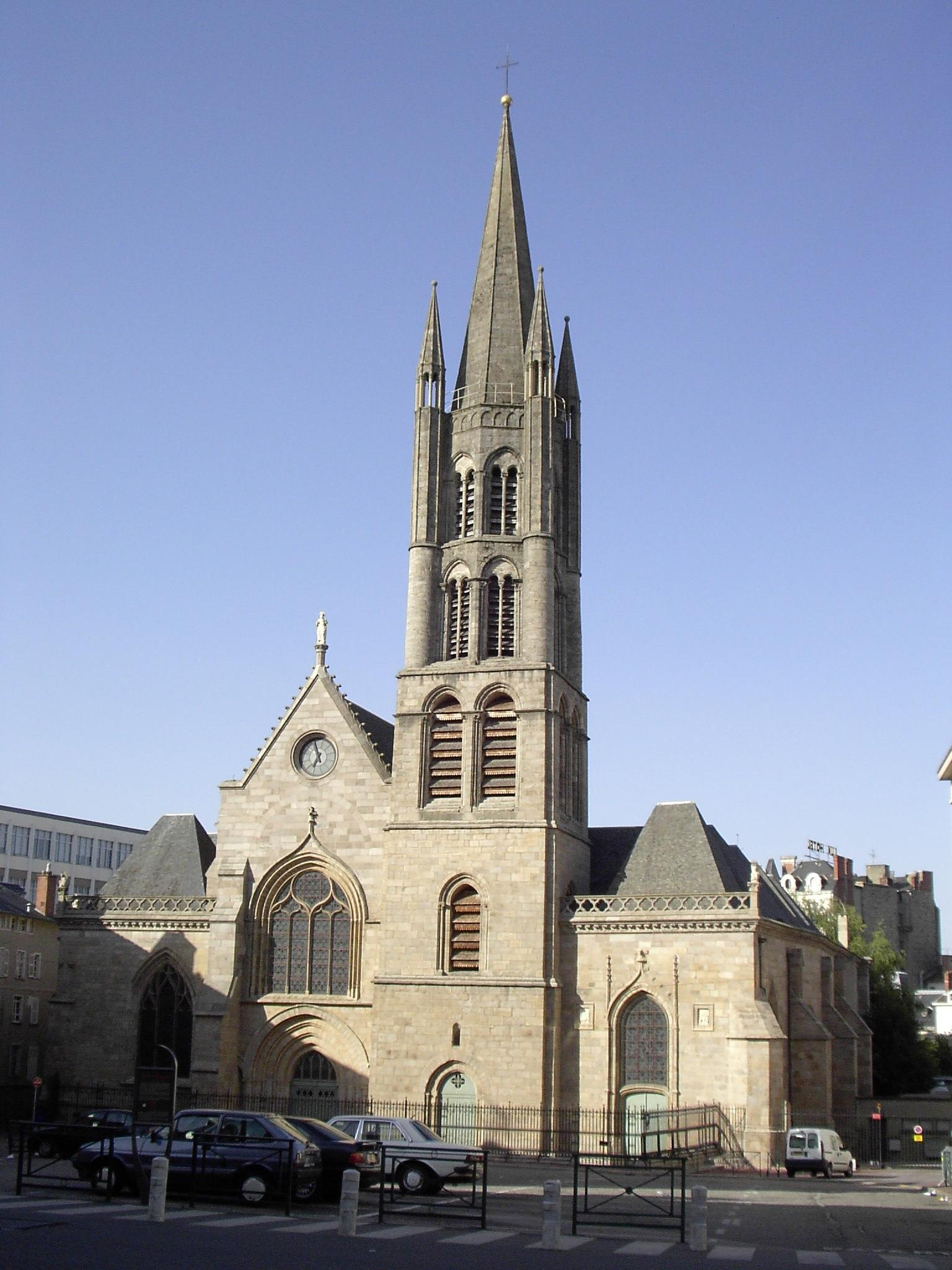

- Location within Nouvelle-Aquitaine
- 45°49′52″N 01°15′42″E
- Type: Roman Catholic church building
- Location: Le Château neighborhood, Limoges, Haute-Vienne, France

History
- Built: 13th century

Site notes
- Architectural styles: Gothic, Romanesque

Monument historique
- Official name: Église Saint-Pierre-du-Queyroix
- Designated: July 9, 1909
- Reference no.: PA00100344

The Church of St. Pierre du Queyroix (French: église Saint-Pierre-du-Queyroix; Limousin Occitan: egleisa de Sant Peire dau Cairoi) is one of the main churches of Limoges, Haute-Vienne, France. It is located in the neighborhood Le Château in the greater city centre of Limoges.

== Description ==
Although the church was built in the Gothic style in the 13th and 16th centuries, it features elements from the Romanesque period. In the 19th century, it was added Gothic-inspired elements, such as gables, balustrades and slate-covered pavilion roofs.

The church has several altarpieces from the Jesuit Chapel which is now located in the enclosure of Gay-Lussac High School.

The church's crypt hosts an ossuary.

The church building became a Class Historic Monument in 1909.

The church has a stained glass window made by Jean Pénicaud in the 16th century. It represents the Coronation of Mary. Another stained glass made by Gustave Doré in 1875 shows the Miraculous catch of fish.

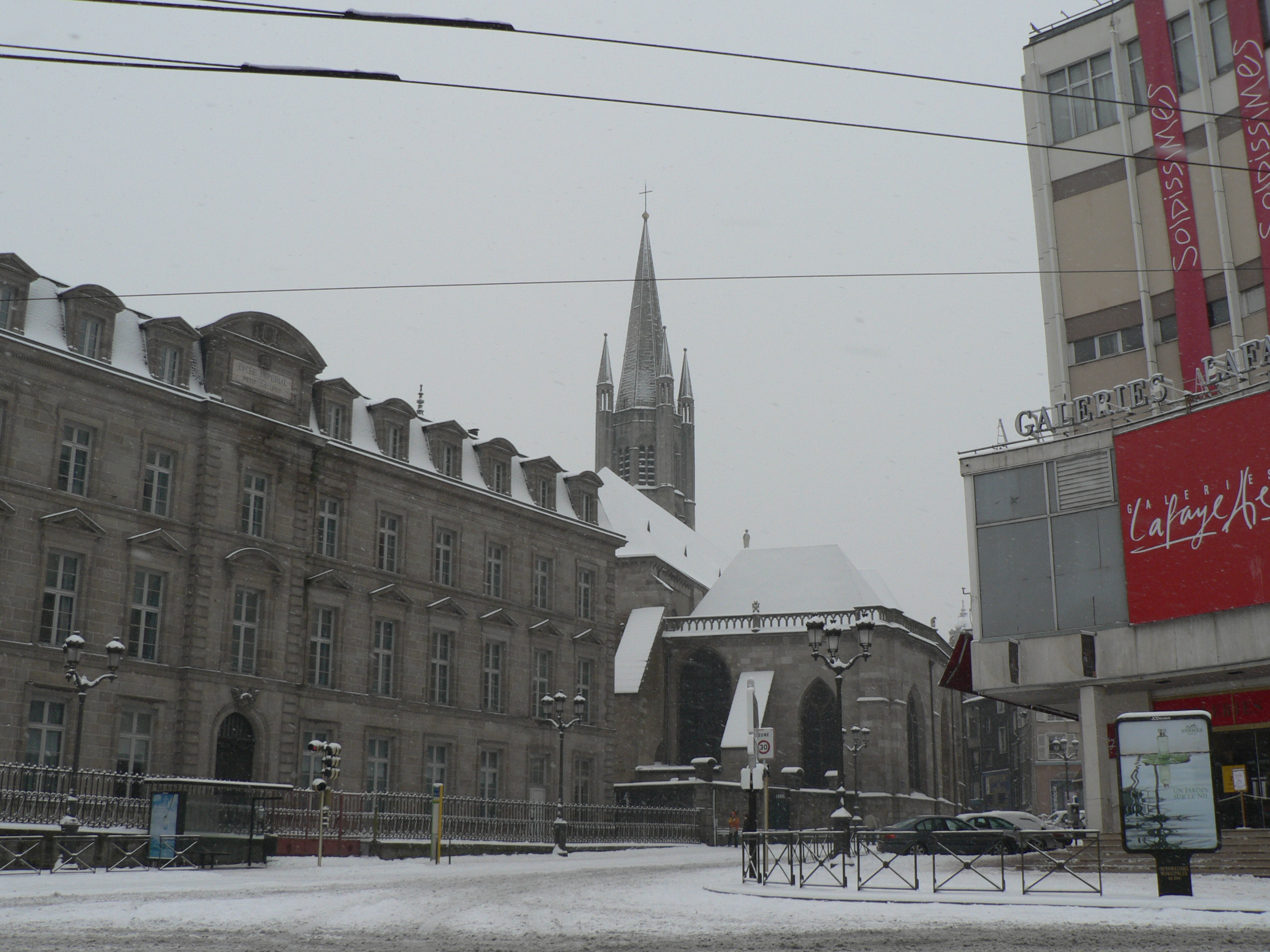
The carrefour Tourny, Gay-Lussac High School and the Church of St. Pierre du Queyroix
