= Auguste Molinier =

French historian (1851–1904)

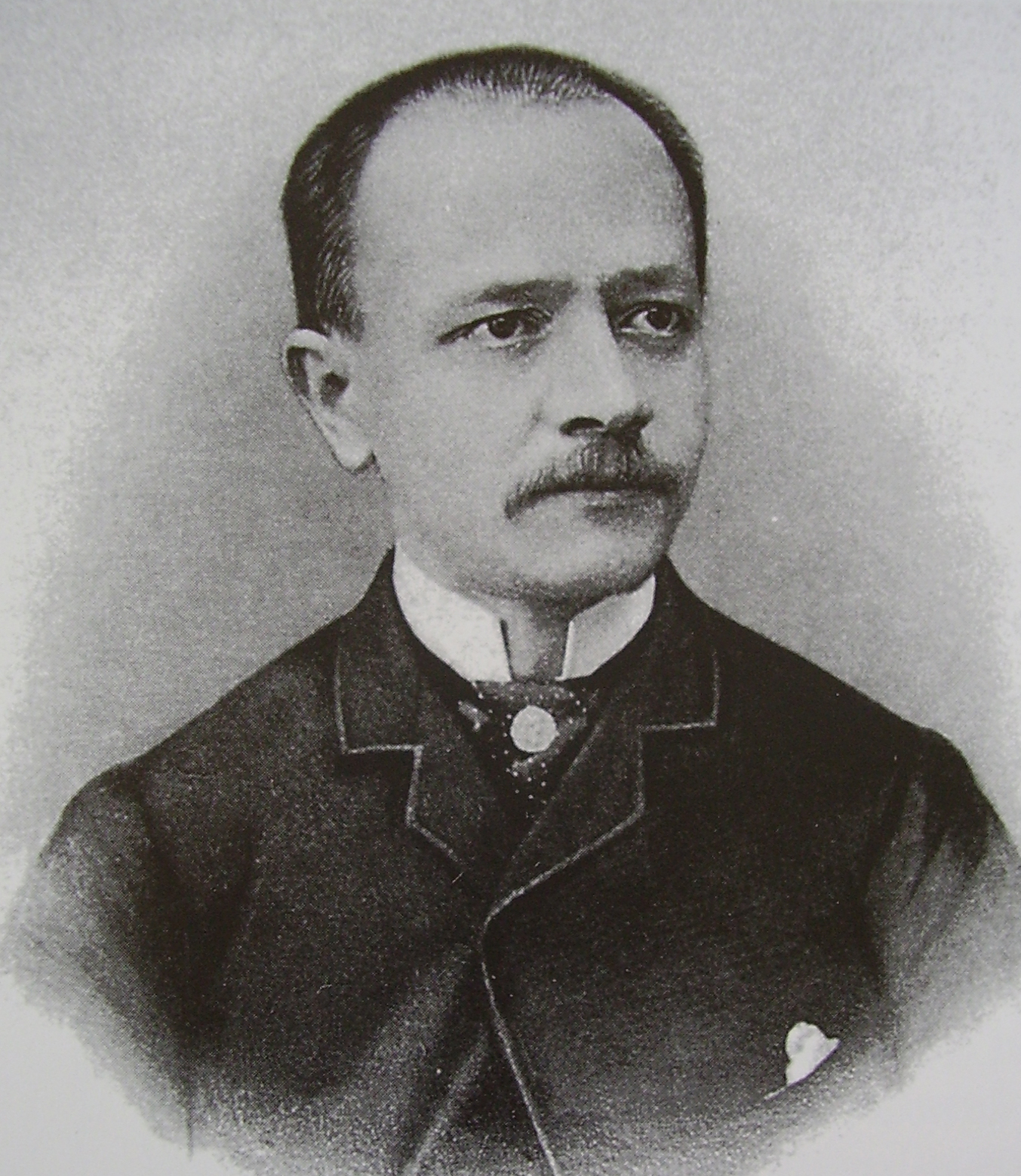
- Born: 30 September 1851; Toulouse
- Died: 19 May 1904 (aged 52); Toulouse
- Occupation: Historian

Auguste Molinier (30 September 1851 – 19 May 1904) was a French historian.

== Biography ==
Born in Toulouse, Auguste Molinier was a student at the École Nationale des Chartes, which he left in 1873, and also at the École pratique des hautes études; and he obtained appointments in the public libraries at the Mazarine (1878), at Fontainebleau (1884), and at Sainte-Geneviève, of which he was nominated librarian in 1885.

He was a good palaeographer and had a thorough knowledge of archives and manuscripts; and he soon achieved a high reputation among scholars of the history of medieval France. His thesis on leaving the École des Chartes was his Catalogue des actes de Simon et d'Amauri de Montfort (inserted in vol. xxxiv of the Bibliothèque de l'École des Chartes), an important contribution to the history of the Albigenses. This marked him out as a capable editor for the new edition of L'histoire générale de Languedoc by Dom Vaissète: he superintended the reprinting of the text, adding notes on the feudal administration of this province from 900 to 1250, on the government of Alphonse of Toulouse, brother of St Louis (1220–1271), and on the historical geography of the province of Languedoc in the Middle Ages.

He also wrote a Bibliographie du Languedoc, which was awarded a prize by the Académie des Inscriptions et Belles-Lettres, but remained in manuscript. He also published several documents for the Société de l'Orient Latin (Itinera hierosolymitana, in collaboration with Carolus Kohler, 1885); for the Société de l'Histoire de France (Chronique normande du XIVe siècle, assisted by his brother Émile, 1883); for the Collection de textes relatifs à l'enseignement de l'histoire (Vie de Louis le Gros, by Suger, 1887); for the Collection des documents inédits (Correspondance administrative d'Alfonse de Poitiers, 1894–1900); for the Recueil des historiens de la France (Obituaires de la province de Sens 1904, 1906), etc., and several volumes in the Recueil des catalogues des bibliothèques publiques de France.

Applying to the French classics the rigorous method used with regard to the texts of the Middle Ages, he published the Pensées of Pascal, revised with the original manuscript (1887–1889), and the Provinciales (1891), edited with notes. In 1893 he was nominated professor at the École des Chartes, and gave a successful series of lectures which he published (Manuel des sources de l'histoire de France au Moyen âge, 1902–1906). He also taught at the École pratique des hautes études. He died after a short illness, leaving in manuscript a criticism on the sources of the Speculum historiale of Vincent de Beauvais.

His elder brother, Charles (born 1843), is also of some importance as an historian, particularly on the history of art and on the heresies of the Middle Ages. He was appointed professor of history at the university of Toulouse in 1886. A younger brother, Émile (1857–1906), was keeper at the Musée du Louvre and a well-known connoisseur of art.

== Works ==
- "Catalogue des actes de Simon et d'Amaury de Montfort" in Bibliothèque de l’École des chartes, vol. 34
- Étude sur l'administration féodale dans le Languedoc (900-1250), 1878
- Les Pensées de Blaise Pascal. Texte revu sur le manuscrit autographe, avec une préface et des notes, 1877–1879
- Itinera hierosolymitana et descriptiones terrae sanctae bellis sacris anteriora (ed. with Titus Tobler), 1879
- Inventaire sommaire de la collection Joly de Fleury, 1881
- Chronique normande du XIVe siècle, 1882, (ed. with Émile Molinier) Available on Gallica
- Vie de Louis le Gros de Suger, suivie de l'Histoire du roi Louis VII, 1887
- Géographie historique de la province de Languedoc au Moyen Âge, 1889
- Les Obituaires français au moyen âge, 1890
- Les Provinciales de Blaise Pascal, avec une préface et des notes (2 vol.), 1891
- Les manuscrits et les miniatures, 1892 Available on Gallica
- Correspondence administrative d'Alfonse de Poitiers, 1894-1900 Available on Gallica: tome 1 tome 2
- Les sources de l'histoire de France (des origines aux guerres d'Italie, 1494), 1901–1906
- Collaboration on the catalogues of manuscripts of the libraries of Beaune, Toulouse, Dijon, Chartres, Cambrai, etc.
