= Laurière =

- Commune
- Coat of arms
- Location of Laurière
- Location within France Location within Nouvelle-Aquitaine
- Coordinates: 46°04′38″N 1°28′34″E
- Country: France
- Region: Nouvelle-Aquitaine
- Department: Haute-Vienne
- Arrondissement: Limoges
- Canton: Ambazac
- Intercommunality: Élan Limousin Avenir Nature

Government
  - Mayor (2020–2026): Jean-Pierre Porte
- Area^{1}: 20.77 km^{2} (8.02 sq mi)
- Highest elevation: 620 m (2,030 ft)
- Lowest elevation: 307 m (1,007 ft)
- Population (2023): 525
  - Density: 25.3/km^{2} (65.5/sq mi)
- Time zone: UTC+01:00 (CET)
  - Summer (DST): UTC+02:00 (CEST)
- INSEE/Postal code: 87083 /87370
- ^{1} French Land Register data, which excludes lakes, ponds, glaciers > 1 km^{2} (0.386 sq mi or 247 acres) and river estuaries.

Laurière (French pronunciation: [loʁjɛʁ]; Occitan: L'Auriera) is a commune in the Haute-Vienne department in the Nouvelle-Aquitaine region in west-central France.

Inhabitants are known as Lauriérois in French.

== See also ==
- Communes of the Haute-Vienne department
