= Grandmontines =

Order of hermit monks, 1073–1787 CE

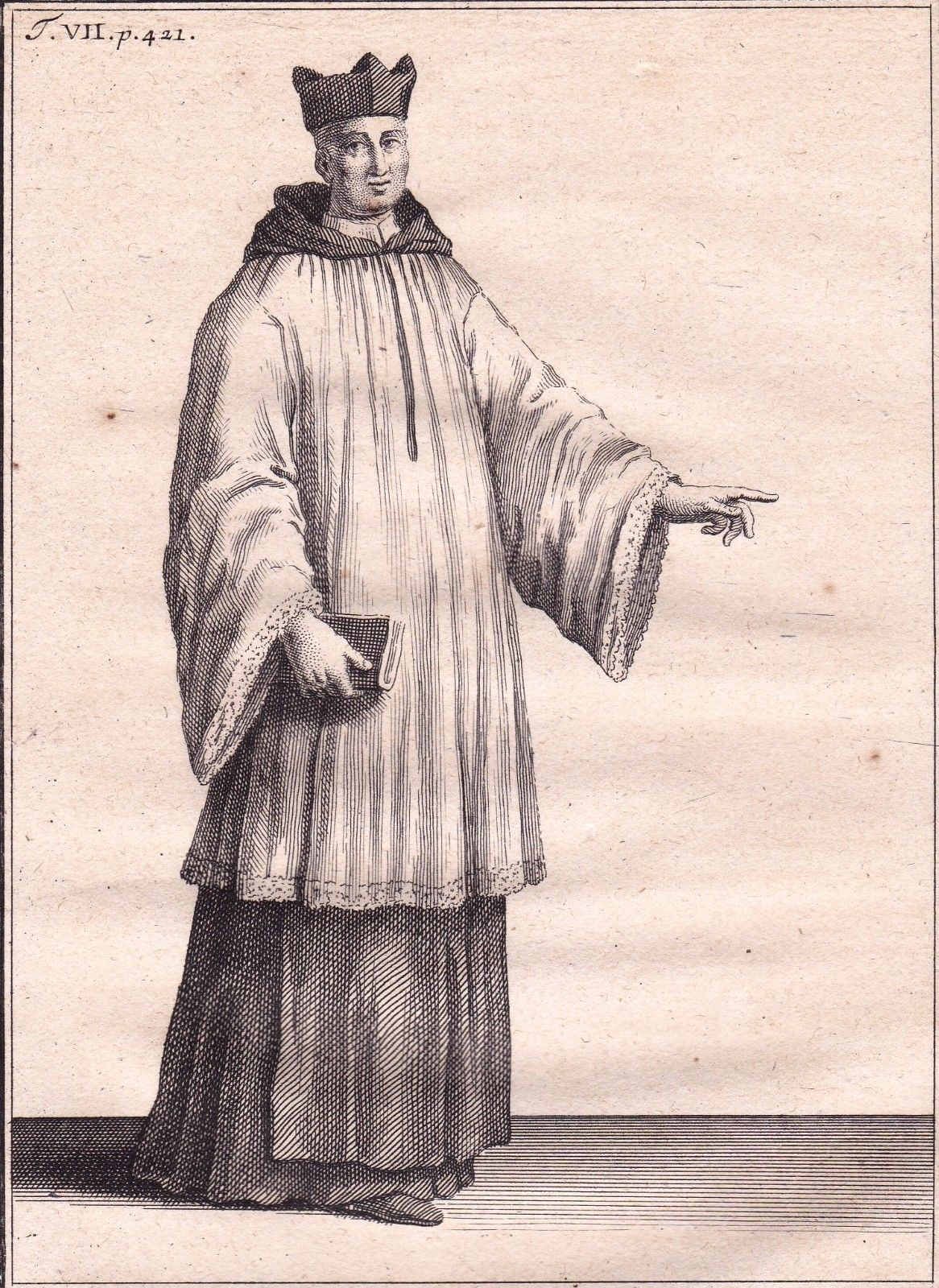
Grandmontine in surplice.

Grandmontines were the monks of the Order of Grandmont, a religious order founded by Saint Stephen of Thiers, towards the end of the 11th century. The order was named after its motherhouse, Grandmont Abbey in the eponymous village, now part of the commune of Saint-Sylvestre, in the department of Haute-Vienne, in Limousin, France. They were also known as the Boni Homines or Bonshommes.

== Founding ==
The exact date of the foundation of the order is very uncertain. The traditional story involves serious chronological difficulties, and is based on a bull of Gregory VII, now known to be a forgery. The founder, St. Stephen of Muret (Étienne in French; also called 'of Thiers') was so impressed by the lives of the hermits whom he saw in Calabria that he desired to introduce the same manner of life into his native country.

Stephen, being ordained, in 1073 obtained the Pope's permission to establish an order. He is said to have settled in Muret near Limoges in 1076, where he made himself a hut of branches of trees and lived there for some time in complete solitude. A few disciples gathered round him, and a community was formed. The Order of Grandmont has been claimed by both Benedictines and Canons Regular as a branch of their respective institutes, although the Grandmontines always maintained that they were hermits.

They tended to seek out woodlands and uplands to situate their monasteries. The architecture of the order of Grandmont is notable for its simplicity. A single barrel vaulted nave with a slightly wider apse. Three windows at the east and one at the west. The entry to the church, in most surviving cases, is in the northwest side.

== The Rule ==
The so-called "Rule of St. Stephen" was compiled at the request of the fourth prior, Étienne de Liciac, by Hugh of Lacerta, and embodies the customs of Grandmont some twenty or thirty years after St. Stephen's death in 1124. The founder himself left no authentic writings. His maxim was "There is no rule save the Gospel of Christ"; as this was the basis of all rules, to practise its morality was to fulfil all the duties of a good religious. The life was eremitical and very severe in regard to silence, diet and bodily austerities; it was modelled after the rule of the Camaldolese, but various regulations were adopted from the Augustinian canons. The superior was called the Corrector. The early Grandmontines were noted for their extreme austerity. Poverty was most strictly observed; the rule forbade the possession of lands, cattle, revenue, or impropriate churches. So concerned were the Grandmontines regarding simoniacal entry that in the customary composed about 1170, it was forbidden to ask a candidate seeking to join, about bringing money, or buying clothes, or equipment for a horse. Begging was only permitted when there was no food in the house, and even then the local bishop was first to be informed of their state. Although discipline was severe, the rule of silence was relatively lenient.

They developed a reputation for simplicity of life and generosity to the poor, along with an emphasis on hospitality. They acquired the nickname the Bonshommes.

== Zenith ==
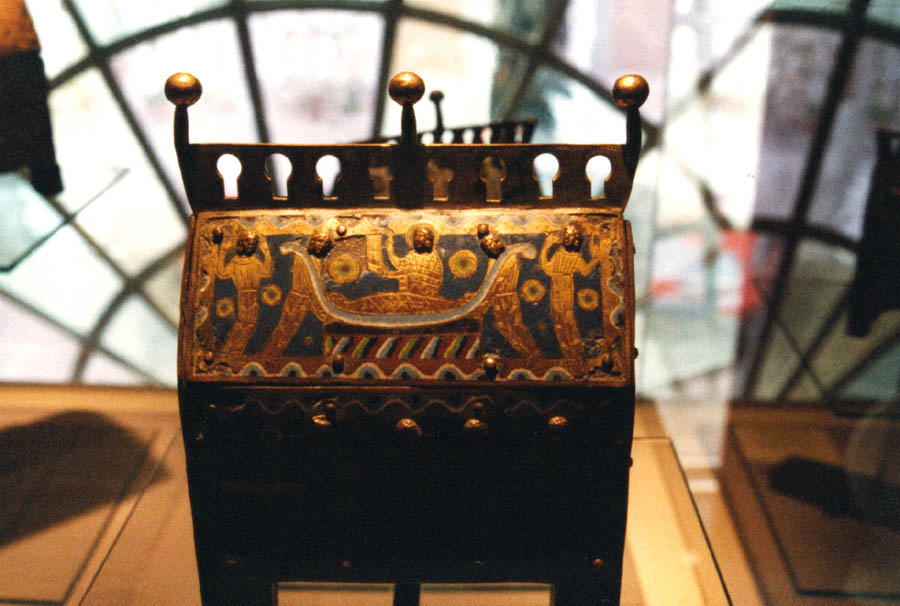
Thomas Becket Reliquary, grandmontine enamel – Limoges (1200–1210).

After the founder's death in 1124, sometime around 1150, having been compelled to leave Muret due to disputed ownership, the hermits settled in the neighboring desert of Grandmont, whence the order derived its name. The influence of the Grandmontines reached its height in the twelfth century. Under Étienne de Liciac the order spread rapidly, and in 1170 numbered sixty monasteries, mostly in Aquitaine, Anjou and Normandy. Under his successor, Bernard de Boschiac, eighty new foundations were made, and the "bons hommes" were to be found in nearly every diocese of France.

Their holy austerity roused the admiration of all beholders, and the kings of England and France vied with one another in bestowing favours upon them. Henry II of England had the monastery rebuilt, and King St. Louis IX of France erected a Grandmontine house at Vincennes near Paris. There were three Grandmontine monasteries in England: Alberbury in Shropshire, Craswall in Herefordshire, and Grosmont Priory in North Yorkshire.

The system of lay brothers was introduced on a large scale, and the management of the temporals was in great measure left in their hands; the arrangement did not work well.

== Decline ==
The golden age of Grandmont however lasted only sixty years after the founder's death. After then, the history of the order is an almost uninterrupted series of disputes, as quarrels between two categories of monks were a constant source of dissension. Even in the twelfth century, the ill-defined position of the lay brothers caused troubles. They were far more numerous than the choir-monks, and were given entire control of all temporalities so the latter might be free to carry on spiritual duties. Gradual relaxation of the rules of poverty led to great possessions, and thus increased the importance of the lay brothers, who now claimed equality with the choir-monks. This led to scandalous scenes. The political situation embittered these dissensions, the order being divided into two parties, French and English. Successive popes tried to restore peace, but in vain. In 1219 the prior of Grandmont and forty monks were again expelled by the rebellious lay brothers. In 1244 the papal delegates advised a union of the order with the Cistercians as a means of ending the disputes. This threat and the expulsion of a large number of monks produced a certain degree of peace. Numbers, however, declined; about 1150, the order had over 1200 members, but towards the beginning of the fourteenth century only 800. Moreover, a relaxation of the rule (1224) led finally to the cessation of all observance.

In 1317 Pope John XXII, sometimes said to have been a Grandmontine monk, issued the papal bull Exigente debito to save the order from complete destruction. Its organization was altered and certain mitigations were approved. The number of houses was reduced from 149 to 39. The prior of Grandmont was made an abbot, and the superiors of the dependent houses, who had hitherto been known as "Correctors", were for the future to bear the title of Prior. The Abbot of Grandmont was to be elected by his own community, and not, as before, by the deputies of the whole order. A general chapter, to be attended by the prior and one monk from each dependent house, was to be held annually.

These vigorous measures brought about a slight recovery, but in spite of the vigilance of the Holy See and the good administration of the first abbots, the improvement was of short duration. The order suffered severely during the Hundred Years' War. From 1471 until 1579 Grandmont was held by commendatory abbots; shortly after the latter date there were only eight monks in the monastery. On one occasion, the abbey was seized by the Huguenots, but in 1604 these were expelled by Abbot Rigaud de Lavaur.

== The Strict Observance ==
In 1643 Abbot Georges Barny (1635–1654) held a general chapter, the first for 134 years, at which Charles Frémon was authorised to found the Strict Observance of the Order of Grandmont. This new branch, which remained under the jurisdiction of the abbot, was conspicuous for the primitive austerity of its observance, but never numbered more than eight houses.

By the beginning of the eighteenth century the two Observances together numbered only about 150 members, but the quarrels were as frequent and as bitter as ever. Grandmont was one of the first victims of the Commission des Réguliers. The monks of the Strict Observance were dispersed in 1780, but the struggle for existence was prolonged until 1787, when the last abbot died. The monastery was finally destroyed at the beginning of the nineteenth century, and nothing but a few fragments of wall now remains.

== Legacy ==
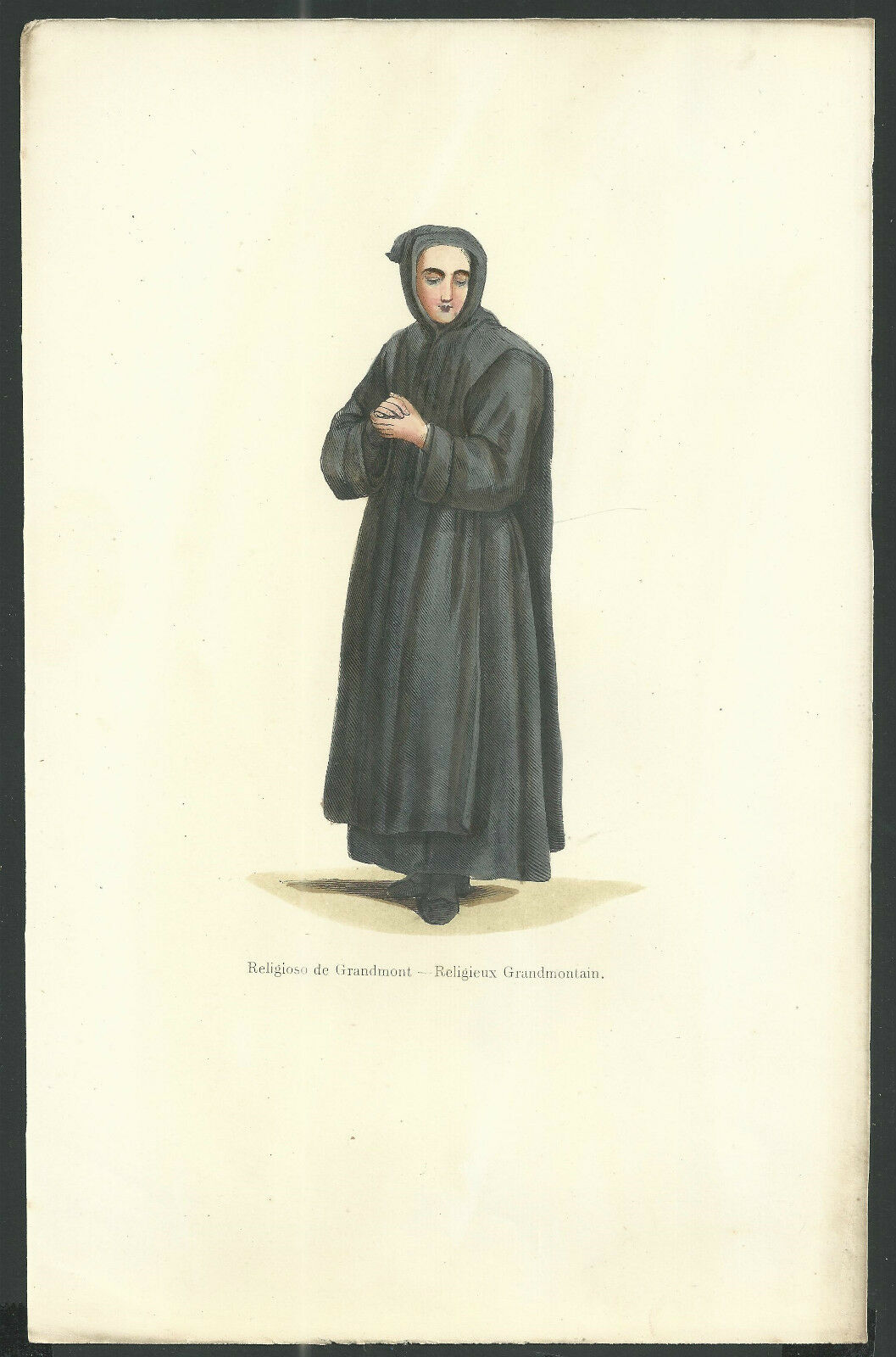
Habit of Grandmont.

Apart from a number of lives of St. Stephen, the most important work issuing from Grandmont was Gérard Ithier's treatise "De institutione novitiorum"—a favourite spiritual work in the Middle Ages, usually but erroneously attributed to Hugh of St. Victor.

The original habit of Grandmont was a coarse tunic with scapular and hood, brown in the early days but changed later to black. The monks gradually laid aside the humble scapular and hood in favour of rochet and biretta. The original habit was resumed by the Strict Observance. The founder had expressly forbidden the reception into the order of houses of religious women, nevertheless four small monasteries of women in the Diocese of Limoges were admitted.

Outside France the order only possessed five houses: two in Navarre (Spain) and three cells in England up to the middle of the 15th century. These latter were Alberbury, Craswall and Grosmont Priories, and as usual in Grandmontine monasteries, were occupied by a very small number of monks.

Later centuries witnessed mitigations and reforms in the life, and at last the order was suppressed just before the French Revolution. In 1979 the former Grandmontine priory of Sainte-Trinité de Grandmont of Villiers was to become the home of a small group intent on restoring the Grandmontine life style; with the permission of the local bishop they began to attempt the restoration of the principles of S. Stephen's monastic life, in the modern world.(Hutchison, Carole A.)

The Grandmontines featured in an episode of the popular BBC TV drama Bonekickers entitled Army of God.

== Sources ==
- Max Heimbucher, Orden und Kongregationen (1896), i. 31
- Helyot, Pierre, Hist. des ordres religieux (17f4), vii. cc. 54, 55
- Wetzer and Welte, Kirchenlexicon (ed. 2)

== Bibliography ==
- The Hermit Monks of Grandmont, by Carole A. Hutchison, Cistercian Publications, 1989. ISBN 0-87907-618-6
- Die Klosteranlagen der Grammontenser – Studien zur französischen Ordensbaukunst des 12. und 13. Jahrhunderts, by Birgitt Legrand, Thesis, University of Freiburg i. Br. (Germany) 2006. (in German)
- Guibert, Louis (1877). Une page de l'histoire du clergé français au XVIIIe siècle: destruction de l'ordre et de l'abbaye de Grandmont (in French). Paris: H. Champion.
