= St. Yrieix =

St. Yrieix is also known as St. Aredius.

Saint-Yrieix is part of the name of several communes in France:

- Saint-Yrieix-la-Montagne, in the Creuse département
- Saint-Yrieix-la-Perche, in the Haute-Vienne département
- Saint-Yrieix-le-Déjalat, in the Corrèze département
- Saint-Yrieix-les-Bois, in the Creuse département
- Saint-Yrieix-sous-Aixe, in the Haute-Vienne département
- Saint-Yrieix-sur-Charente, in the Charente département
