= Razès, Haute-Vienne =

Razès
- Commune
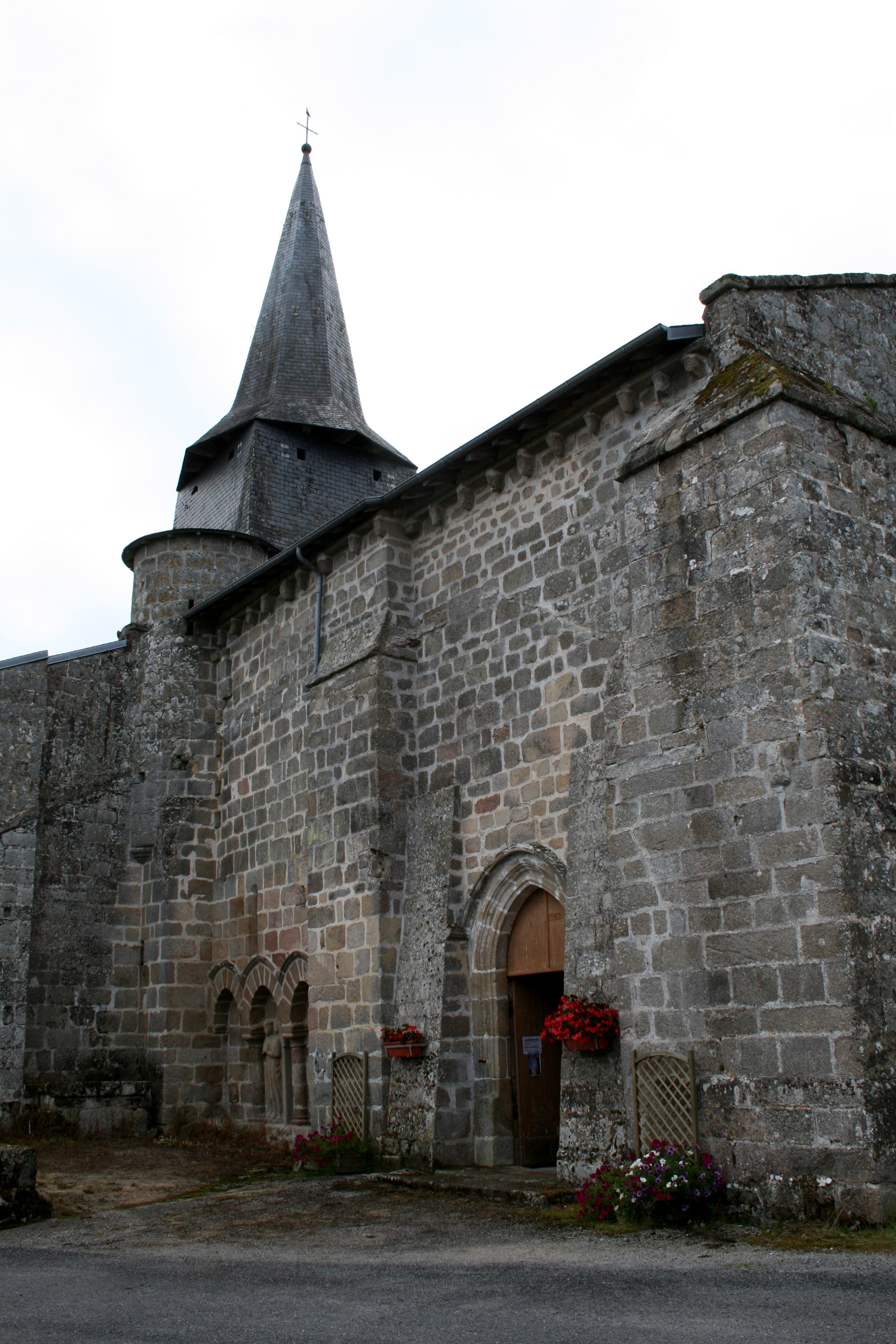
- The church of the Glorious Cross, in Razès

- Coat of arms
- Location of Razès
- Location within France Location within Nouvelle-Aquitaine
- Coordinates: 46°02′00″N 1°20′22″E
- Country: France
- Region: Nouvelle-Aquitaine
- Department: Haute-Vienne
- Arrondissement: Bellac
- Canton: Ambazac

Government
  - Mayor (2022–2026): Kevin Goudard
- Area^{1}: 24.14 km^{2} (9.32 sq mi)
- Highest elevation: 576 m (1,890 ft)
- Lowest elevation: 360 m (1,180 ft)
- Population (2023): 1,150
  - Density: 47.6/km^{2} (123/sq mi)
- Time zone: UTC+01:00 (CET)
  - Summer (DST): UTC+02:00 (CEST)
- INSEE/Postal code: 87122 /87640
- ^{1} French Land Register data, which excludes lakes, ponds, glaciers > 1 km^{2} (0.386 sq mi or 247 acres) and river estuaries.

Razès (French pronunciation: [ʁazɛ]; Occitan: Rasès) is a commune in the Haute-Vienne department in the Nouvelle-Aquitaine region in west-central France.

Inhabitants are known as Razelauds.

== See also ==
- Communes of the Haute-Vienne department
