= Ruricius =

Gallo-Roman aristocrat and bishop of Limoges

Ruricius I (c. 440 – c. 510) was a Gallo-Roman aristocrat and bishop of Limoges from c. 485 to 510. He is one of the writers whose letters survive from late Roman Gaul, depicting the influence of the Visigoths on the Roman lifestyle. He should not be confused with his son-in-law, Saint Rusticus (Archbishop of Lyon).

== Life ==
Little is known about the life of Ruricius, and some of what information is available is not certain. He is one of four Gallo-Roman aristocrats of the fifth- to sixth-century whose letters survive in quantity: the others include Sidonius Apollinaris, urban prefect of Rome in 468 and bishop of Clermont (died 485), Alcimus Ecdicius Avitus, Bishop of Vienne (died 518); and Magnus Felix Ennodius of Arles, Bishop of Ticinum (died 534). All of them were linked in a tightly bound, Gallo-Roman aristocratic network that provided the bishops of Catholic Gaul.

Although there is scarce information about Ruricius' life, it is known that he eventually became a grandfather, suggesting he must have lived to be at least 55 or 60. He may have died as early as 506 to as late as 510, so this puts his birth date around 440. Likewise, there is no information concerning his birthplace, though he appears to have had strong ties to Aquitaine in the region of Cahors, and there is significant information regarding his family.

=== Ancestry ===
According to Venantius Fortunatus, Ruricius was a member of the Anician family, one of the most important aristocratic families in Rome. The details of his ancestry has been a subject of debate; Mathisen's explanation is that Ruricius was the son of a "Constantius" and a "Leontia" based on his premise that his paternal grandfather may have been Flavius Constantius Felix and his mother a member of the aristocratic familia Pontii Leontii of Burdigalia in Aquitania. Further evidence he provides includes (1) for Constantius, on the existence of an ivory consular diptych for Fl. Constantius Felix (cos. 428), patrician and magister militum from 425 to 430 at Limoges and the fact that Ruricius had a son of that name, and (2) for Leontia, the use of the name Leontius for Ruricius' brother and son.

Christian Settipani agrees that Ruricius' mother was a member of the Pontii Leontii, a possible daughter of Adelfius I, bishop of Limoges, but does not make any specific reference as to who Ruricius' father might be. He argues that the name of the consul of 428 was in fact Flavius Felix and that the name "Constantius" was added in error which would make this person one of the Ennodii and that the Ennodii did not become related to Ruricius until the next generation through marriage to one of his sons by an Ennodian mother of Parthenius.

Mommaerts and Kelley propose that Ruricius may be the son of an African proconsul, name as yet unknown, but otherwise identified (by title) by Sidonius in his letter to Montius as the father of said Camillus. This would make Ruricius brother to Camillus and Firminus of Arles. The objection to this hypothesis has been that it makes the unnamed African proconsul an otherwise unattested son of regicide emperor Petronius Maximus and that there are not any Firminid names among Ruricius' immediate descendants. Settipani now accepts Petronius Maximus as an Anicius but argues the unnamed African proconsul was unlikely to have been Maximus' son. In support of the Kelley/Mommaerts hypothesis is the evidence in his letters of Ruricius' strong ties to Arles and an argument that the name "Firminus" in fact came into use among the Ferreoli through the marriage of Papianilla, whom they hypothesize to have been a sister of Ruricius, to Tonantius Ferreolus; however, the matter of Ruricius' paternal heritage remains controversial.

Perhaps the oddest thing is Sidonius' uncharacteristic failure to enthuse about Ruricius' father, whoever he was. Perhaps since Ruricius was apparently at one point Sidonius' protégé, Sidonius may have felt it somehow inappropriate. Some suggest that nevertheless Ruricius may not have been an Anicius because he makes no reference in his surviving letters that he is related, nor does he communicate with any known member of the family. On balance, the evidence of Venantius Fortunatus is rather more persuasive.

=== Marriage and children ===
Ruricius married Hiberia, the daughter of an Arvernian senator Ommatius, a descendant of a Patrician who lived in the 4th century named Philagrius. It is noted that Hiberia participated in Ruricius' conversion to religious life, and thus succession to the episcopal see of Limoges in about 485.

Though no direct evidence survives to say whether they had any daughters, it is known that Ruricius and Hiberia had five sons: Ommatius (eldest), Eparchius, Constantius, Leontius, and Aurelianus. Also, Ruricius had several grandchildren, and at least one great-grandchild. Nevertheless, it has been speculated that their daughter was the wife of Rusticus, archbishop of Lyon.

=== Bishop ===
During the late empire and after the Visigothic takeover of imperial Gaul, it was common for Gallo-Roman aristocrats to take refuge in church office, allowing not only retention of local influence, but also some personal security. Incidentally, Ruricius was appointed bishop of Limoges after the death of king Euric on December 28, 484. Euric was succeeded by his son, Alaric II. He reigned throughout Ruricius’ time as bishop, apparently making good use of, among other things, Ruricius' legal acumen, until Ruricius passed from the scene as stated before between late 506 and 510. Apart from his letters, Ruricius' only other known physical legacy is the monastery and church of Saint Augustine, which he built ca. 485.

== Writings ==
Ruricius’ collection of 83 letters, of which 12 are addressed to him, survive in a single manuscript called Codex Sangallensis 190. They cover a period of about 30 years, and describe what happened in Gaul after the final Roman withdrawal just before 480. The letters give insight into what the life of the literate Roman population was like under barbarian rule; what changed, and what remained. For example, they make almost no note of the effect of the Visigoths on local life and activities, posing the question as to whether the locals were very much affected. Most of Ruricius’ correspondence was directed to nearby bishops, and people in his family. Although he does have some renowned correspondents, for the most part, they are not well known. Finally, the letters of Ruricius shed light on the underlying circumstances surrounding the Battle of Vouillé, near Poitiers in 507; a fundamental battle in Gallic history, since it is where the Franks defeated the Visigoths.

== Historiographical contribution ==
=== Controversy surrounding relevance ===
Ralph W. Mathisen, the translator of the most recent set of Ruricius’ letters, writes that they are of great significance to our understanding of the survival of classical literature and the development of Western European religion and society. However, some historians criticize the letters because of their historical irrelevance. D.R. Bradley notes that the letters give insufficient information for either the ecclesiastical historian or the theologian because they neglect major contemporary events. His main argument is that Ruricius had the habit of sending verbal messages by the bearer of his letters; therefore his letters give no insight into the events of Visigothic Gaul.

=== Relation to contemporaries ===
Similar to historiographical controversy, it is argued that in comparison to other letter writers such as Sidonius Apollinaris, Avitus of Vienne, and Ennodius of Pavia, Ruricius is extremely silent on contemporary historical events. For instance, Ruricius makes no mention in his letters of developments such as the Frankish incursions into the Visigothic kingdom, but it can be assumed that they were of great concern. Ruricius’ correspondence is therefore more representative of typical late Roman aristocratic written transactions. As such, he provides a different, and valuable, perspective to the evidence of more politically active letter writers such as Augustine, Sidonius, Avitus, Ennodius and Cassiodorus. His letters distinguish themselves from those written by Sidonius, for example, many of whose letters were composed when Gaul was still a part of the Roman Empire. Mathisen notes that the neglect of Ruricius in translation is unfortunate, because he provides a picture of life in late Roman Gaul that significantly compliments that given by Sidonius. Ruricius is a valid representative of the "Gallic rhetorical style".

=== Epistolography ===
Ruricius’ letters demonstrate the importance of letter writing, also known as epistolography. He had many famous contemporary correspondents, whose letters compliment his own, and vice versa. Epistolography was the most important means of preserving one's aristocratic ties during the period of literary decline in late Roman Gaul, as the imperial literary traditions were removed.

== Sources ==
- Bradley, D. R. "Review: The Letters of Ruricius." The Classical Review, New Series 4, no. 3/4 (1954): 268–269.
- Gilliard, Frank. "The Senators of Sixth-Century Gaul." Speculum, 54 (1979): 685–697.
- Mathisen, R. W. Ruricius of Limoges and Friends: A Collection of Letters from Visigothic Gaul. Liverpool: Liverpool University Press, 1999.
- Mathisen, R. W. "Barbarian Bishops and the Churches "in Barbaricis Gentibus" during Late Antiquity." Speculum, 72 (1997): 664-697.
- Mathisen, R. W. Roman Aristocrats in Barbarian Gaul: Strategies for Survival in an Age of Transition. Austin, TX: University of Texas Press, 1993.
- Mathisen, R. W. Studies in the History, Literature, and Society of Late Antiquity. Amsterdam: Hakert, 1991.
- Mathisen, R. W. Ecclesiastical Factionalism and Religious Controversy in Fifth Century Gaul. Washington, D.C.: Catholic University of America Press, 1989.
- Mathisen, R. W. "The Theme of Literary Decline in Late Roman Gaul." Classical Philology, 83 (1988): 45–52.
- Mathisen, R. W. "Emigrants, Exiles and Survivors: Aristocratic Options in Visigothic Aquitania." Phoenix, 38 (1984): 159–170.
- Mathisen, R. W. "Epistolography, Literary Circles and Family Ties in Late Roman Gaul." Transactions of the American Philogical Association, 111 (1981): 95–109.
- Mathisen, R. W. and Danuta Shanzer. Society and Culture in Late Antique Gaul: Revisiting the Sources. Michigan: Ashgate, 2001.
- Mommaerts, T. Stanford, and Kelley, David H. "The Anicii of Gaul and Rome," in Fifth-Century Gaul: A Crisis of Identity? Edited by John Drinkwater and Hugh Elton. Cambridge, 1992.
- Neri, Marino (ed.), Ruricio di Limoges: Lettere (Pisa: Edizioni ETS, 2009) (Pubblicazioni della Facoltà di Lettere e Filosofía dell' Università di Pavia, 122).
- Settipani, Christian. Les Ancêtres de Charlemagne (France: Éditions Christian, 1989).
- Settipani, Christian. "Ruricius, premier évêque de Limoges et ses alliances familiales." Francia, 18 (1991).
- Settipani, Christian. Continuite Gentilice et Continuite Familiae Das Les Familles Senatoriales Romaines a L'Epoque Imperialle: Mythe et Realite. Oxford: Unit for Prosopographical Research, Linacre College, University of Oxford, 2000.
- Settipani, Christian. ADDENDUM et CORRIGIENDA (juillet 2000-octobre 2002) for Continuite Gentilice et Continuite Familiae Das Les Familles Senatoriales Romaines a L'Epoque Imperialle: Mythe et Realite. http://users.ox.ac.uk/~prosop/publications/volume-two.pdf (2002)
