= Émile Molinier =

French curator and art historian (1857–1906)

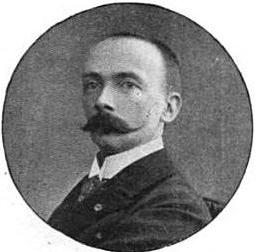
- Born: Charles Louis Marie Émile Molinier; 26 April 1857; Nantes
- Died: 5 May 1906 (aged 49); Paris
- Occupations: Curator; Art historian

Émile Molinier (26 April 1857 – 5 May 1906) was a 19th-century French curator and art historian.

== Career ==
Following his elder brother Auguste, Émile Molinier studied at the École Nationale des Chartes. He wrote a thesis on medieval history entitled Étude sur la vie d'Ernoul, sire d'Audrehem, maréchal de France which earned him the archivist paleographer degree in 1879.

He first worked at the Département des Estampes et de la Photographie de la Bibliothèque nationale de France before joining the Louvre, where he served as curator of the newly created art objects department. He published books on stained glass, ceramics, enamels and furniture and organized major exhibitions, including the Exposition Rétrospective held at the Petit Palais in 1900. A specialist of French decorative art, he wrote the first catalog of the Wallace Collection at the time of its opening.

== Selected works ==
- 1882: Chronique normande du XIVe siècle, (editor, with Auguste Molinier)
- 1882: Catalogue de la collection Timbal, (in collab.)
- 1883: Étude sur la vie d'Arnoul d'Audrehem, maréchal de France, 1302-1370
- 1883: Les Majoliques italiennes en Italie
- 1884: Les Della Robbia, leur vie et leur œuvre, d'après des documents inédits, suivi d'un catalogue de l'œuvre des Della Robbia en Italie et dans les principaux musées de l'Europe, (in collab.)
- 1885: Dictionnaire des émailleurs, depuis le moyen âge jusqu'à la fin du XVIII,
- 1886: Le Château de Fontainebleau au XVIIe siècle, d'après des documents inédits, (in collaboration with Eugène Müntz)
- 1888: La Céramique italienne au XVe siècle,
- 1888: Le Trésor de la basilique de Saint-Marc à Venise,
- 1889: Venise, ses arts décoratifs, ses musées et ses collections
- 1891: L'Émaillerie, Hachette, series "La Bibliothèque des merveilles"
- 1894: Benvenuto Cellini
- 1896: Catalogue des ivoires
- 1897: Histoire générale des arts appliqués à l'industrie du Ve à la fin du XVIIIe siècle, (codir. Et collab.)
- 1902: Le mobilier français du XVIIe et du XVIIIe
- 1890-1891 L'Art. Revue bi-mensuelle illustrée (director and chief editor)
