= Áureo =

Áureo or Aureo is a female given name, equivalent to English Stephanie. Notable people referred to by this name include the following:

- Áureo Malinverni (1933–2023), Brazilian professional footballer and manager
- Áureo Lídio Moreira Ribeiro (born 1979), Brazilian politician and businessman
- Áureo Comamala, Spanish pharmacist and footballer
- Aureo Castro (1917–1993), Portuguese priest

== See also ==
- Aurelio (disambiguation)
- Aurelius (disambiguation)
