= Aureliano =

Aureliano, equivalent to Aurelian and Aurelianus, is both a given name and a surname which can refer to:

Given name

- Aureliano Blanquet (1849–1919), general of the Federal Army during the Mexican Civil War
- Aureliano Bolognesi (1930–2018), Italian boxer
- Aureliano Brandolini (1927–2008), Italian agronomist and development cooperation scholar
- Aureliano Cândido Tavares Bastos (1839–1875), Brazilian politician, writer and journalist
- Aureliano Chaves (1929–2003), Brazilian politician
- Aureliano de Sousa e Oliveira Coutinho (1800–1855), Brazilian politician, judge and monarchist
- Aureliano de Beruete (1845–1912), Spanish landscape painter, art critic and social activist
- Aureliano Fernández-Guerra (1816–1894), Spanish historian, epigrapher and antiquarian
- Aureliano Lessa (1828–1861), Brazilian poet
- Aureliano Maestre de San Juan (1828–1890), Spanish scientist, histologist, physician and anatomist
- Aureliano Milani (1675–1749), Italian painter of the late-Baroque period
- Aureliano Pertile (1885–1952), Italian lyric-dramatic tenor
- Aureliano Sánchez Arango (1907–1976), Cuban lawyer, politician and university professor
- Aureliano Torres (born 1982), Paraguayan football player
- Aureliano Urrutia (1871–1975), Mexican physician, and the Minister of Interior
- Colonel Aureliano Buendía, fictional character from One Hundred Years of Solitude by Gabriel García Márquez

Surname

- Rodolfo Aureliano (1901–1964), Brazilian philanthropist. One of the first Afro-Brazilians to reach the position of judge of the Law.
- Mariano Aureliano (1925–1988), American author
- Tito Aureliano (born 1989), Brazilian paleontologist.
- Waldemar Aureliano De Oliveira Filho (born 1965), retired Brazilian footballer

== See also ==
- Aureli
- Aureliano in Palmira, 1813 operatic dramma serio by Gioachino Rossini
