= Marco Aurélio =

Marco Aurélio is a Portuguese and Marco Aurelio a Spanish and Italian given name. People with the name include:

== Footballers ==
- Marco Aurélio Cunha dos Santos (born 1967), Brazilian footballer
- Marquinho (footballer, born August 1986) (Marco Aurélio Iubel), Brazilian footballer
- Marco Aurélio (footballer, born 1940), Brazilian footballer
- Marco Aurélio (footballer, born 1952), Brazilian footballer
- Marco Aurélio Ribeiro Barbieri (born 1983), Brazilian footballer
- Marco Aurélio (footballer, born 1989), Portuguese footballer
- Marco Aurélio Siqueira (born 1970), Brazilian footballer
- Mehmet Aurélio, (Marco Aurélio Brito dos Prazeres, born 1977), Turkish footballer
- Marcão (footballer, born 1972) (Marco Aurélio de Oliveira), Brazilian footballer
- Marco Sousa (Marco Aurélio Ribeiro Sousa, born 1995), Portuguese footballer
- Marquinho (footballer, born 1982), (Marco Aurelio Pereira Alves, born 1982), Brazilian footballer

== Politicians ==
- Marco Aurelio Robles (1905–1990), President of Panama
- Marco Aurelio Soto (1846—1908), President of Honduras
- Marco Aurélio Garcia (1941–2017), Brazilian politician

== Other people ==
- Marco Aurelio Denegri (1938–2018), Peruvian intellectual
- Marco Aurélio dos Santos (born 1974), Brazilian futsal player
- Marco Aurélio Mello (born 1946), Brazilian judge
- Marco Aurélio Motta (born 1960), Brazilian volleyball

== See also ==
- Aurelio (disambiguation)
- Marcos Aurélio
