= Aurelianus =

Aurelianus may refer to:

- Aurelianus (conspirator), supposed conspirator against Caracalla in the 3rd century
- Aurelian (Lucius Domitius Aurelianus; c. 214–c. 275), Roman emperor 270–275
- Aurelianus (consul 400) (fl. 393–416), politician of the Eastern Roman Empire
- Caelius Aurelianus, 5th century medical writer
- Ambrosius Aurelianus (fl. 5th-century), Romano-British war leader
- Aurelianus (Gallo-Roman) (fl. late 5th-century), statesman, commander and magnate in Gaul, and chief advisor of Clovis I
- Aurelianus of Arles (523 – 551), Archbishop of Arles 546–551
- Aurelianus (bug), a genus of seed bugs

== See also ==
- Aurelian (disambiguation)
- Aurelius (disambiguation)
