= Marcos Aurélio =

Marcos Aurélio is an Iberian given name. People with the name include:

- Marcos Aurélio (footballer, born 1984) (Marcos Aurélio de Oliveira Lima)
- Marcos Aurélio (footballer, born 1977) (Marcos Aurélio Fernandes da Silva)
- Marcos Aurelio Di Paulo (1920–1996), Argentine footballer
- Marcos Górriz (Marcos Aurelio Górriz Bonhora, born 1964), Spanish tennis player
- Marcos Aurélio Galeano (born 1972), Brazilian footballer
- Marcos Aurélio Titon (born 1976), known as Marcão, Brazilian–Portuguese footballer
- Macula (footballer) (Marcos Aurélio dos Santos, born 1968), Brazilian footballer
- Marcos Denner (Marco Aurélio Martins Ivo, born 1976), Brazilian footballer
- Marquinhos (footballer, born August 1982) (Marcos Aurélio Lima Barros)

== See also ==
- Marco Aurélio
- Marcus Aurélio
