= La Martyre Parish close =

Coordinates: 48.4490°N 4.1600°W

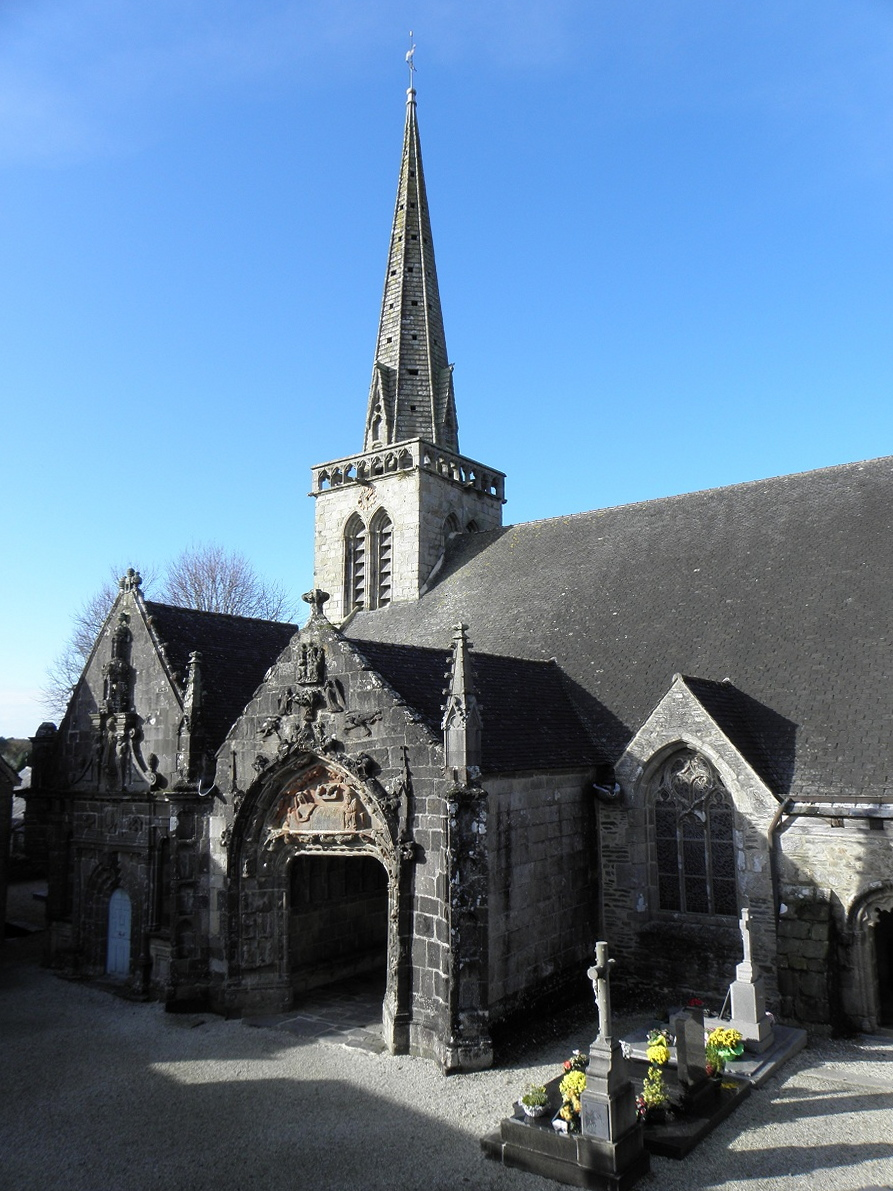
The Saint Salomon church in La Martyre

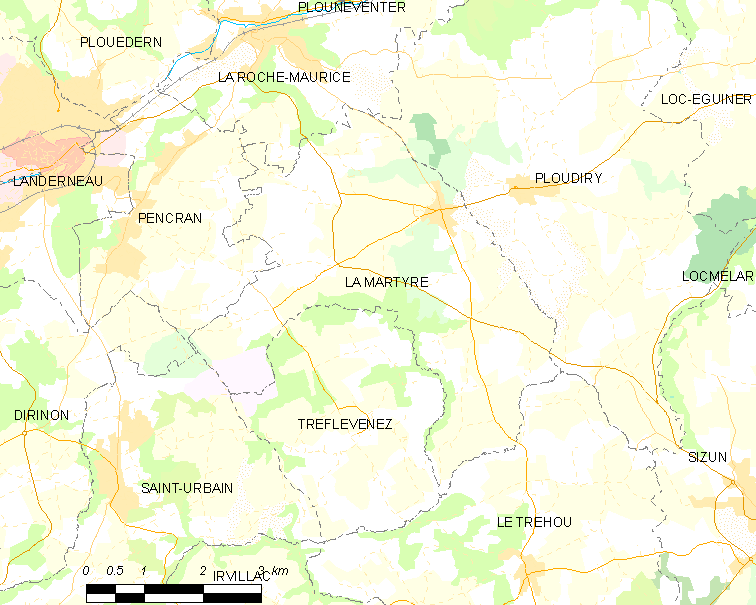
Map showing the location of La Martyre

The La Martyre Parish close (Enclos paroissial) is located in the arrondissement of Brest in Brittany in north-western France. The La Martyre complex comprises the parish church dedicated to Saint Salomon, a "porte triomphale" and an ossuary/chapel. It was founded by the Rohan family and replaced an earlier church which had been called "Notre Dame du Merzer". The church is dedicated to the Breton King Salomon. Much of the church was restored after storm damage in 1450 but the ossuary is of a much later date, being built in 1619. The outstanding features are the south porch which is essentially flamboyant Gothic in style with a decorated entrance arch, the "porte triomphale" entrance and the ossuary. Inside the church there are some notable furnishings. The village owes its name to the assassination on 25 June 874 of King Salomon of Brittany, who had sought refuge in the village church. The church was called "la Martyre" (Ar Merzher, the Martyr) after its desecration, and the name was taken up by the village. As for the king, he was canonised in 910 for his martyrdom. The church, the cemetery gate, the calvary and the former chapel are a listed historical monument since 1916.

== The enclosure entrance or "porte triomphale" ==
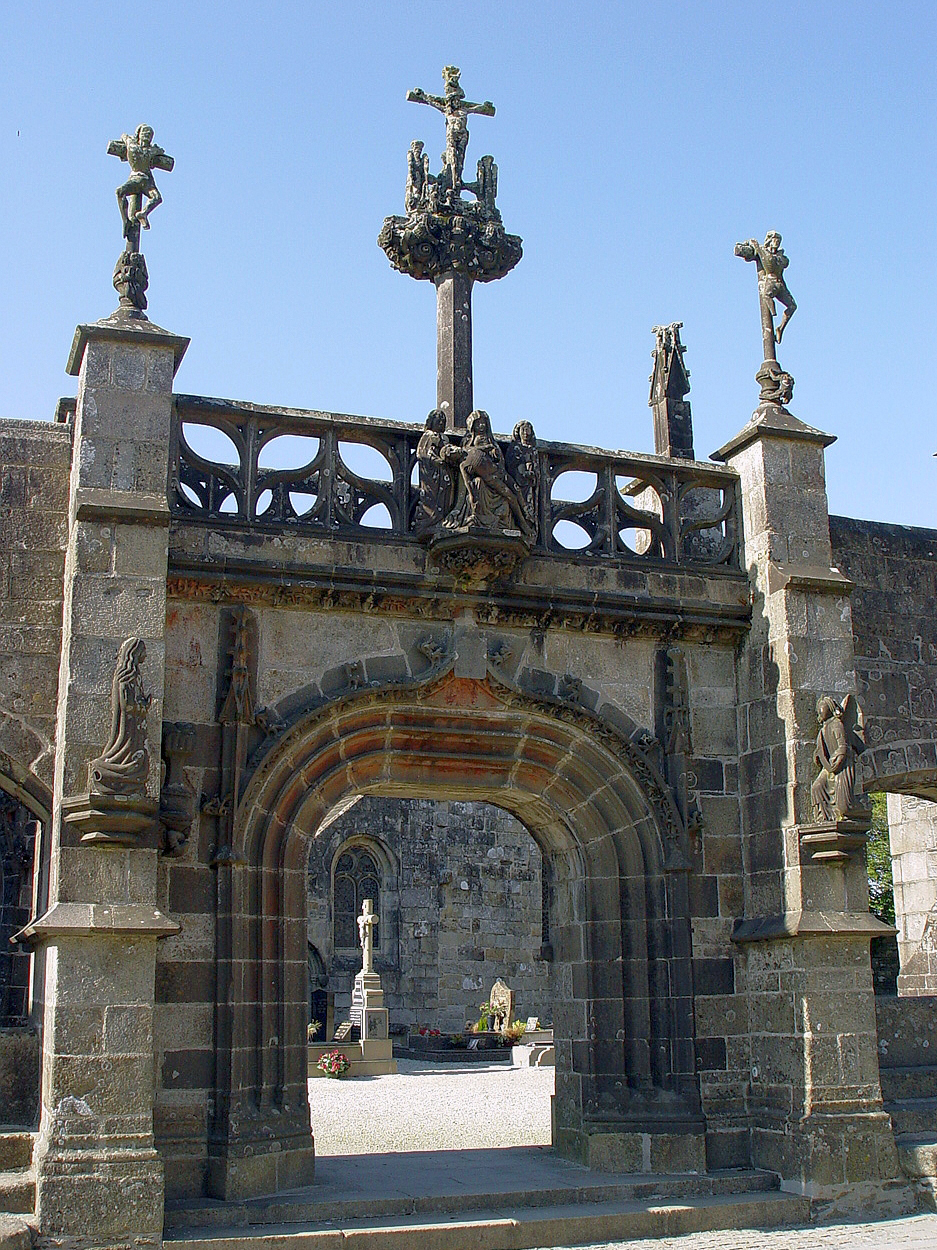
The central arch of the "porte triomphale". We can see the three crosses of the Calvary, the pietà over the central arch, the balustraded walkway and the Rohan coat of arms

The entrance to the "enclos" dates to the 15th/16th century and has the three crosses at the top and a walkway. The calvary comprises three crosses; the crucifixion cross with smaller crosses bearing the "good" and the "bad robber". Jesus is shown hanging on the central or crucifixion cross and on the reverse side of this cross there is a depiction of the "Risen Christ" with Jesus being shown emerging from his tomb. At the foot of the "good" robber's cross is an angel who waits to whisk the robber's soul off to heaven whilst beneath the "bad" robber's cross, a demonic figure waits to take that robber's soul down into hell. The building to the left of the entrance was once the look-out post from which the borders of the medieval kingdom, then the duchy of Cornouaille, were watched.

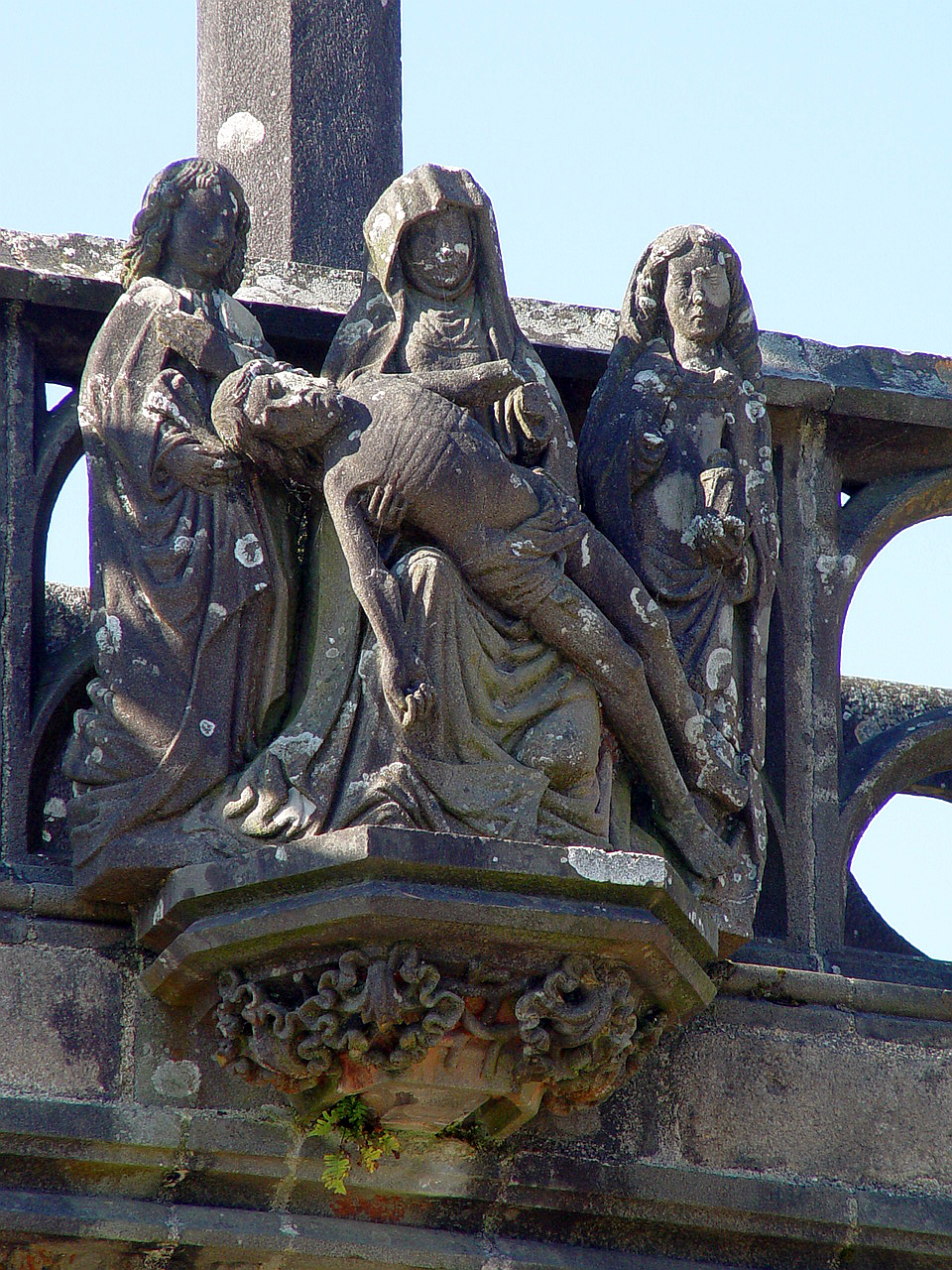
The Pietà positioned in the centre of the three-arched entrance

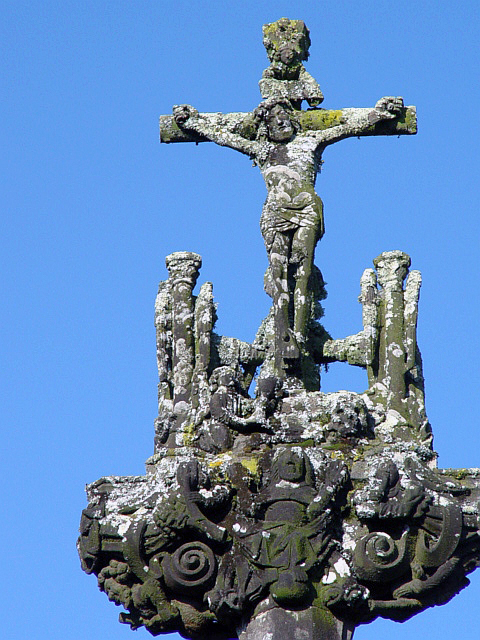
The crucifixion cross

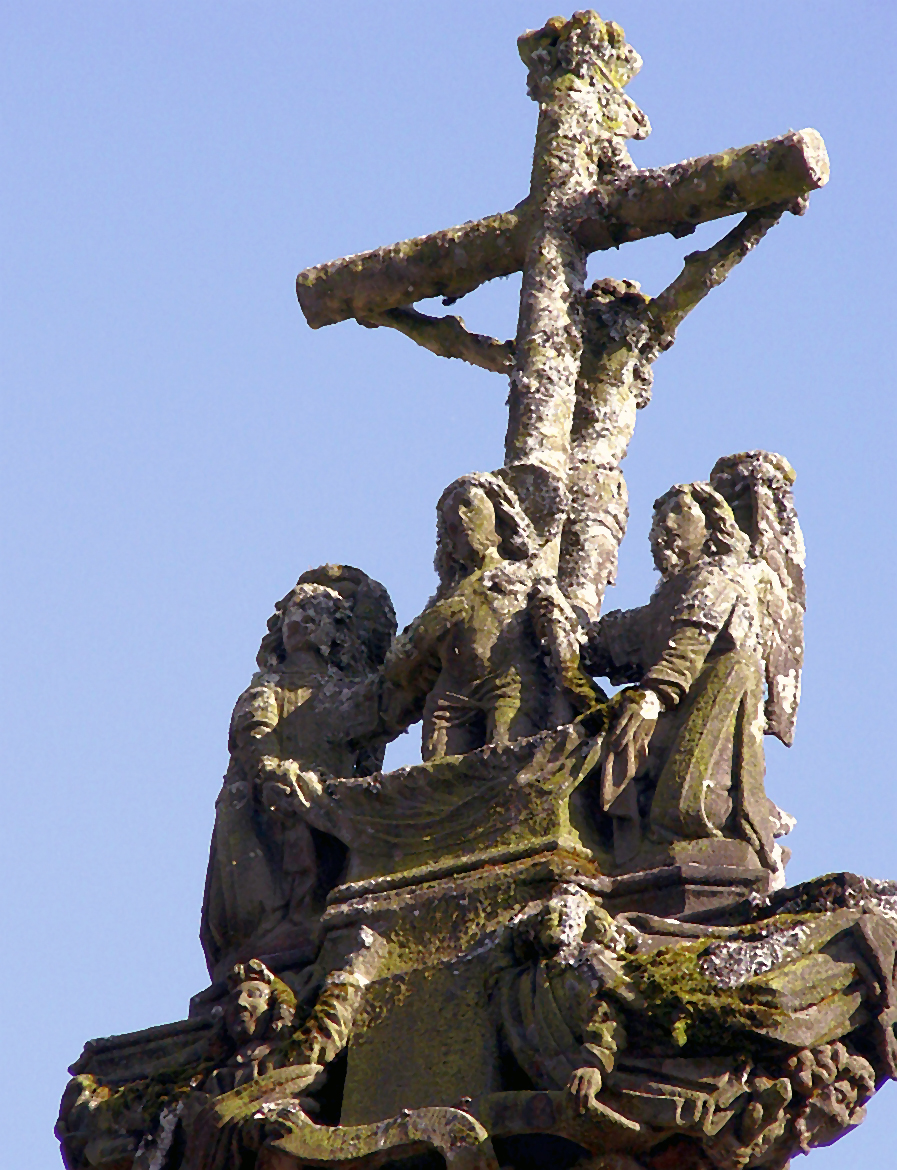
The resurrection. This can be seen on the central cross of the calvary and on the reverse side of the depiction of the crucified Christ, Christ is shown emerging from his tomb

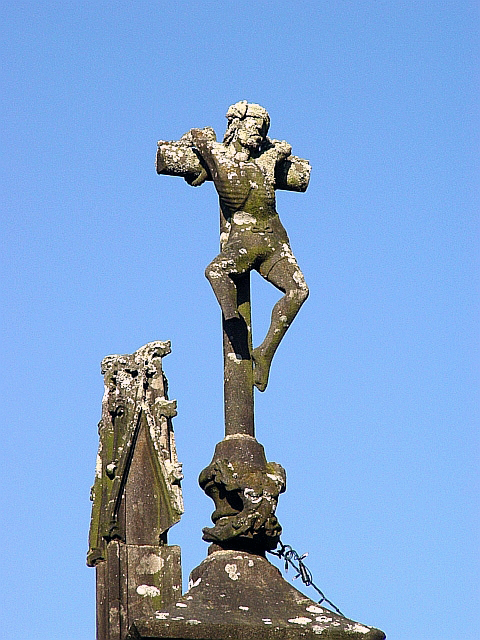
The bad robber. There is a demon at the base of the cross ready to take his soul to hell

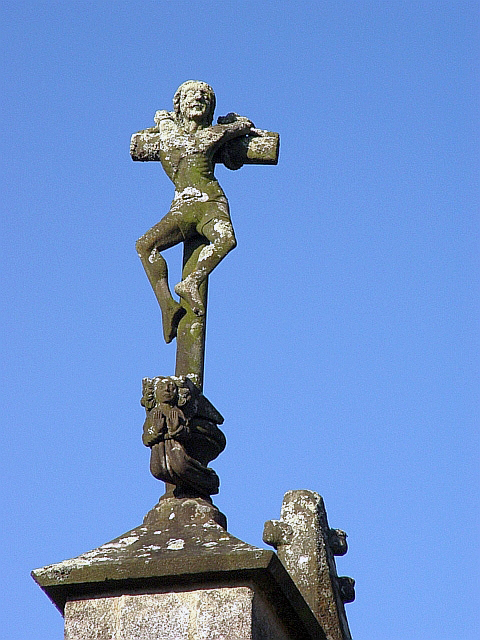
The good robber. There is an angel at the base of his cross, ready to take his soul to heaven

== The ossuary ==
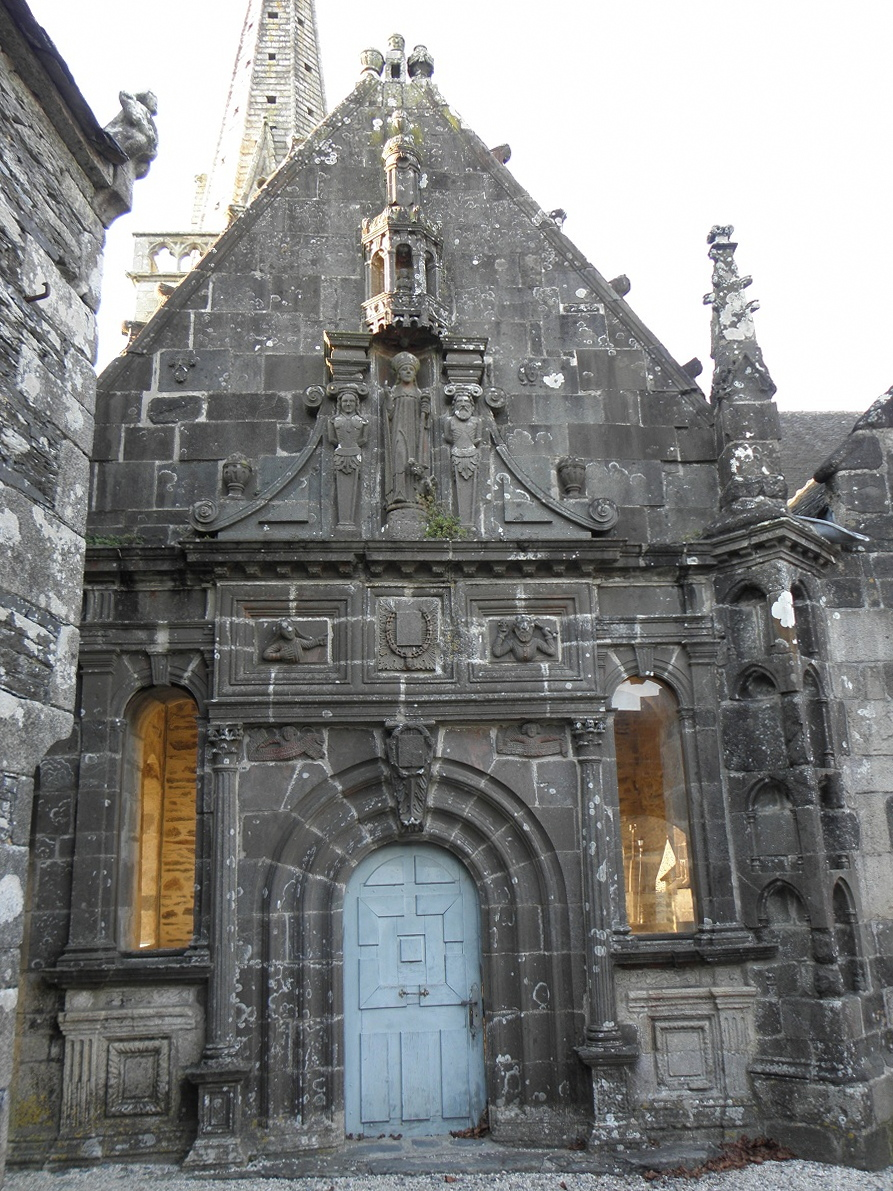
The entrance to the ossuary positioned to the right of the south porch. At the top of the facade and within the gable ("pignon") area is a lantern like structure which contains the depiction of a small kneeling angel and under this is a depiction of Saint Aurelian (Saint Pol de Léon) who has just slain a dragon. A woman and a man stand on either side, their hands behind their backs. Also in the gable area are small reliefs depicting a man with a beard on the left and a man without a beard on the right. Beneath Saint Aurelian and on the architrave are depictions of a woman on the left and a man on the right. They are positioned on either side of a depiction of the "Order of Saint Michel". The woman has long hair and has one hand resting on her chest whilst, with the other hand, she points across to the man on the right who brandishes a skull and a bone. Below two angels hold banners with inscriptions in Breton.

It was two years after working on the porch at Guimiliau that the "Maître de Plougastel" was commissioned in 1619 to work on the ossuary at La Martyre, and he built it in the "Renaissance" style. In the upper gable or "pignon" there is a small, lantern-like structure in which a small angel is shown kneeling in prayer. Beneath, on a dais, is a statue of Saint Aurelian who has just slain a dragon. A woman and a man stand on either side of him, their arms held behind their backs. Also in the gable area there are two small reliefs, one depicting a man with a beard and the other a man without a beard. Further down two angels are depicted holding banners with extracts from a 1575 religious poem "Mirouer de la mort". Higher up on the architrave are three relief carvings. That on the left depicts a woman with one hand resting on her chest whilst she points with her other hand to a carving on the right depicting a man brandishing a skull and a human bone. These two reliefs are positioned on either side of a depiction of a necklace or chain of office said to be the "Order of St Michel".

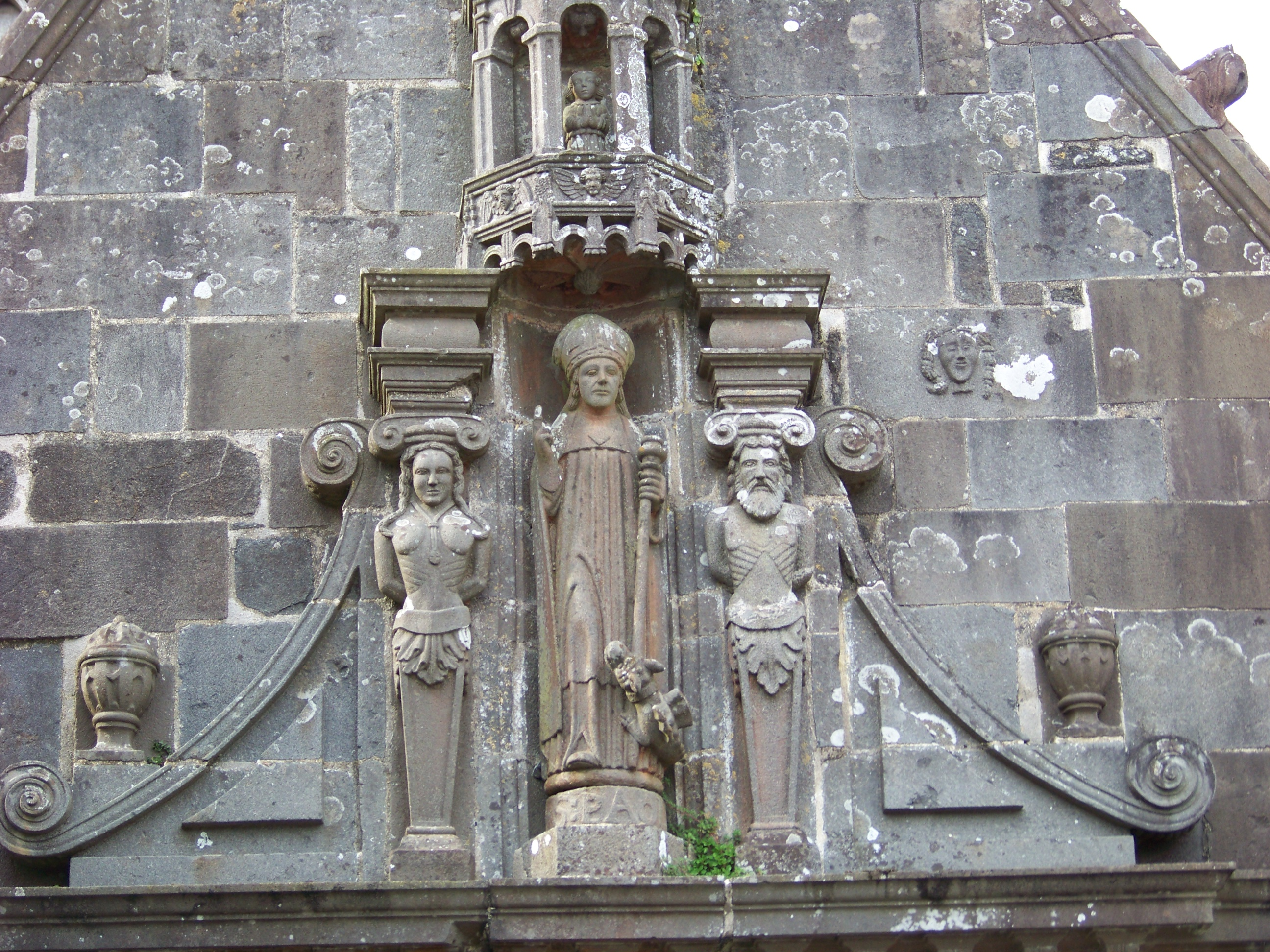
The depiction of Saint Aurelian with two caryatids on the ossuary gable

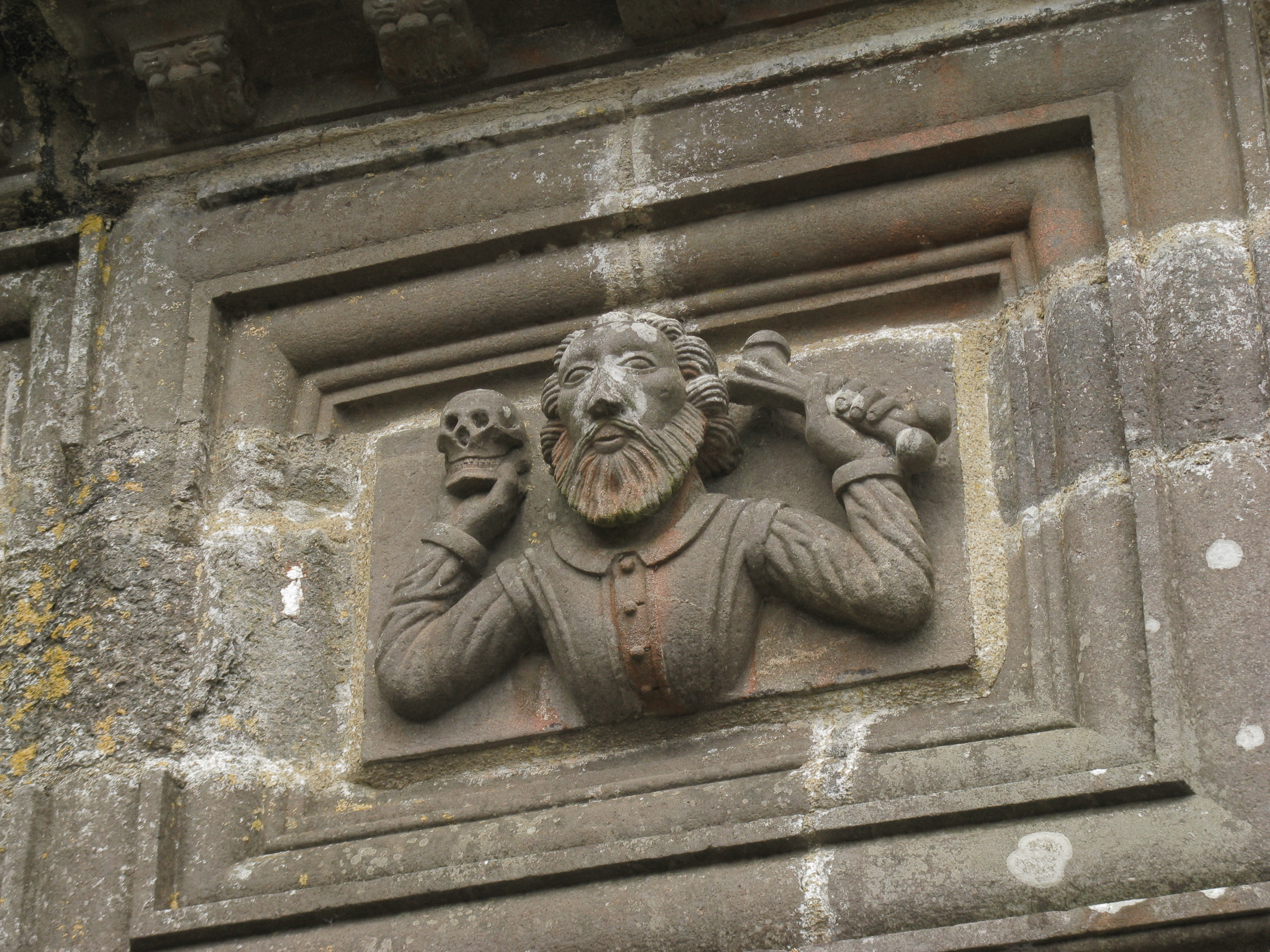
The carving depicting a man holding a skull and a human bone

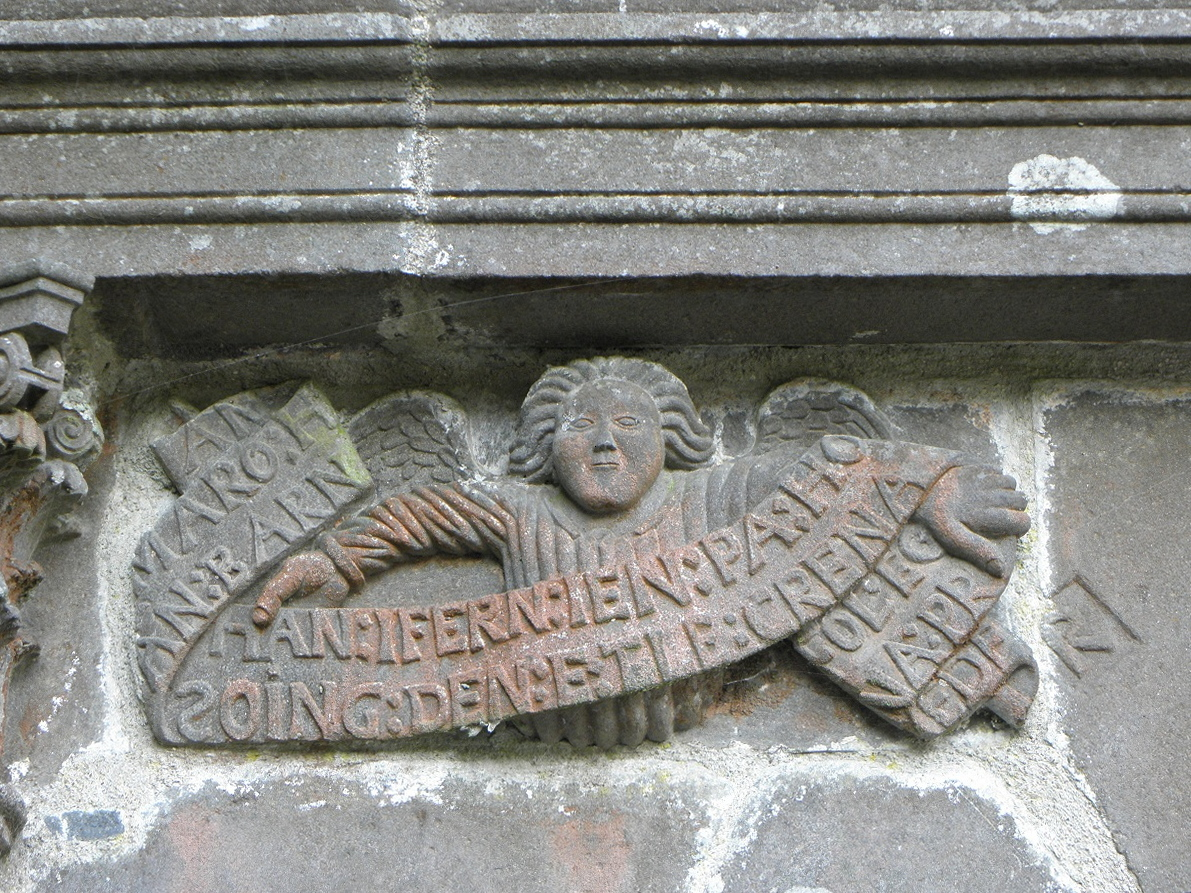
An angel holds a banner inscribed in Breton "AN:MARO:HAN:BARN:HAN:INFERN:IEN:PA:HO:SOING:DEN:E:TLE:CRENA FOL:EO NA:PREDER" which translates as "La Mort, le Jugement, l'Enfer glacé, quand l'homme y songe, il doit trembler" or "Death, judgment, freezing hell. Think on that and fear it".

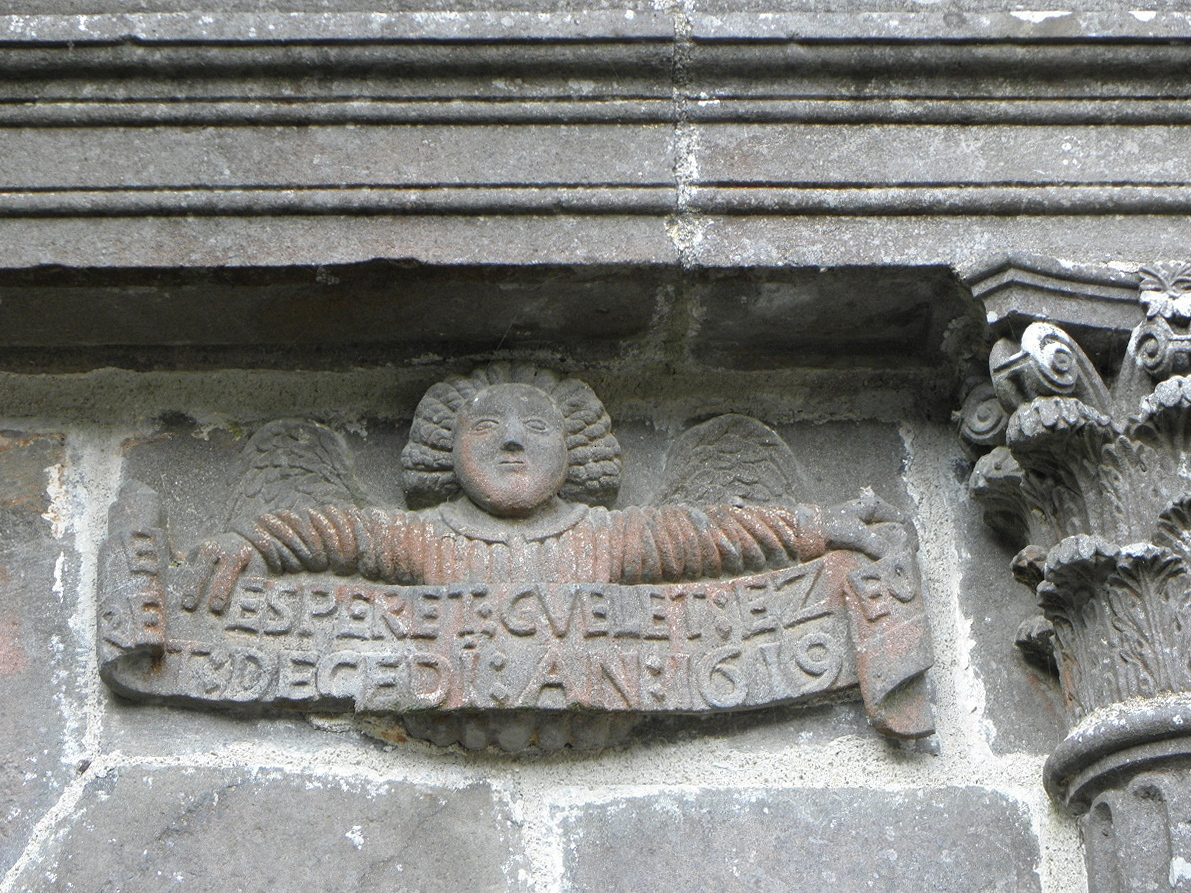
The second angel holds a banner reading "Fol est son esprit s'il ne prend garde de voir qu'il faut mourir, an 1619" or "Foolish is he who does not know that he must die".

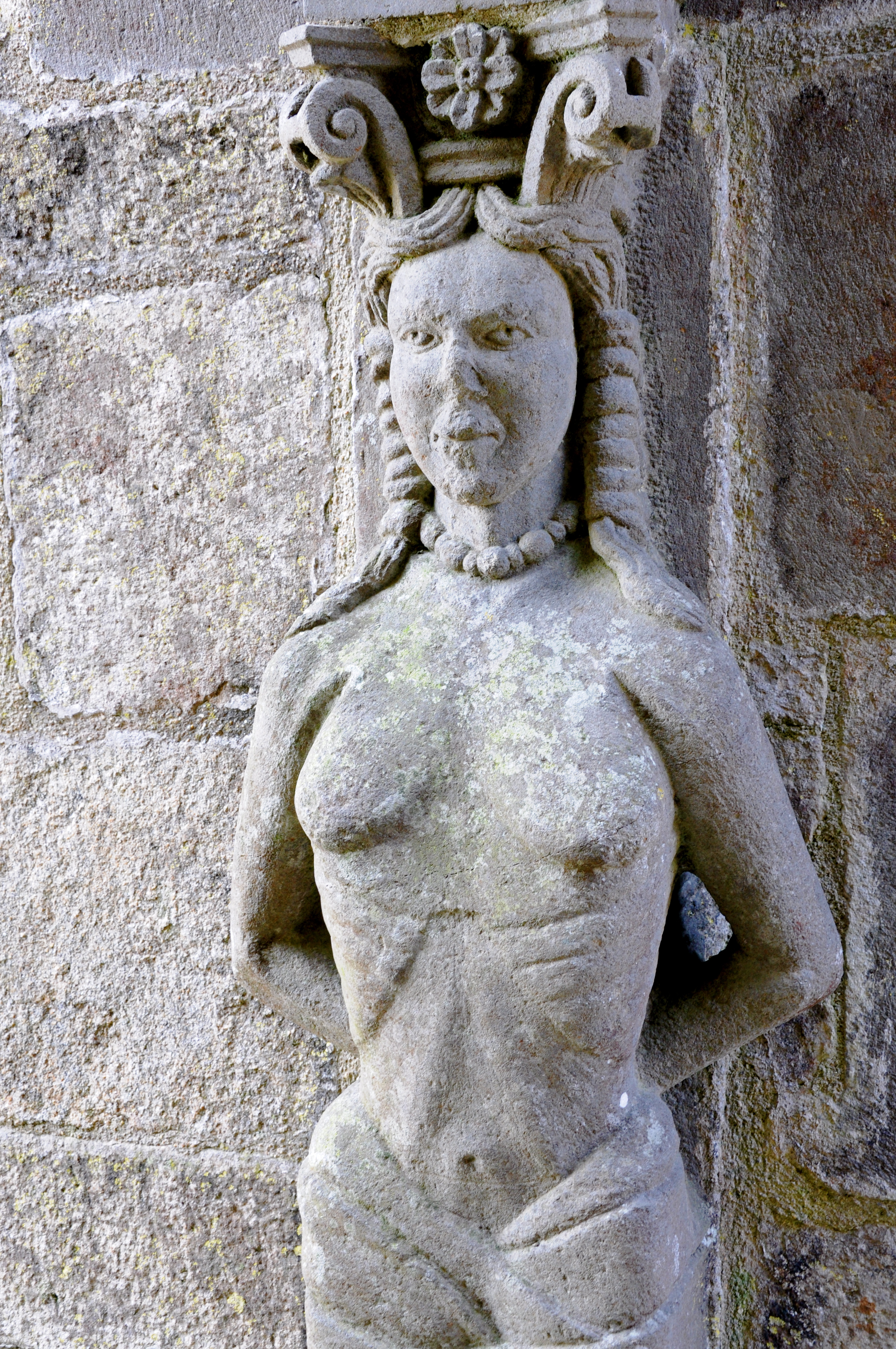
Just near the ossuary is this caryatid said to be based on a design by Sébastien Serlio.

== The south porch ==
The church possesses a beautiful south porch dating to 1450-1455 and celebrating the Nativity with scenes from Jesus Christ's childhood carved into the arch's voussures. In the angle of the arch, two small winged angels hold the coat of arms of the local Kersauzon family who had donated funds for the church building. The porch is flanked with buttresses with decorated Gothic pinnacles and empty niches. A depiction of the crowning of the Virgin Mary decorates the summit of the gable, a theme said to have been inspired by the tympanum on the porch of the church in Senlis (there was no reference to such an event in the Bible). As part of the gable two kneeling angels with phylacteries float in the air and a little higher another two angels are kneeling in prayer. In the scene depicting the crowning of the Virgin Mary, God is shown lifting his hand toward the Virgin Mary in blessing and behind him is an angel. Two further angels are behind the Virgin Mary. The piédroits and voussures of the south porch depict angels with shields and banners, an angel holding an open book and scenes from Jesus' birth and childhood, including the Annunciation and the Adoration of the Magi, the Visitation (Christianity) and the marriage of the Virgin Mary, the Presentation of Jesus at the Temple and Jesus with the lawyers. Higher up there is a depiction of a man wearing a crown and carrying a cross. He gives instructions to his army represented by three small figures in armour. Some historians have thought this a depiction of Herod giving an order for the massacre of the innocents whilst others believe it to be a depiction of King Solomon. There are also depictions of Saint Sebastian, Saint Lawrence and other saints and church dignitaries. Inside the porch are statues of the apostles, measuring between 80 and 90 centimetres in height. Some can be identified but not all of them. In the southeast corner of the entrance porch is a stoup with a depiction of the "Ankou". On the "trumeau" between the two doors by which one can access the church once inside the porch, is a depiction of the Virgin Mary with child. It is 1.22 metres high and carved from kersanton stone. Above the doors are the coats of arms of the Rohan and Léon families. The double door dates to 1692. Other depictions in the voussures are of Saint Sebastian with arrow, Saint Lawrence with grille, Guy de Maufuric de Lezuzan and Saint Fiacre. Work on the south porch is attributed to the Atelier du Folgoët.

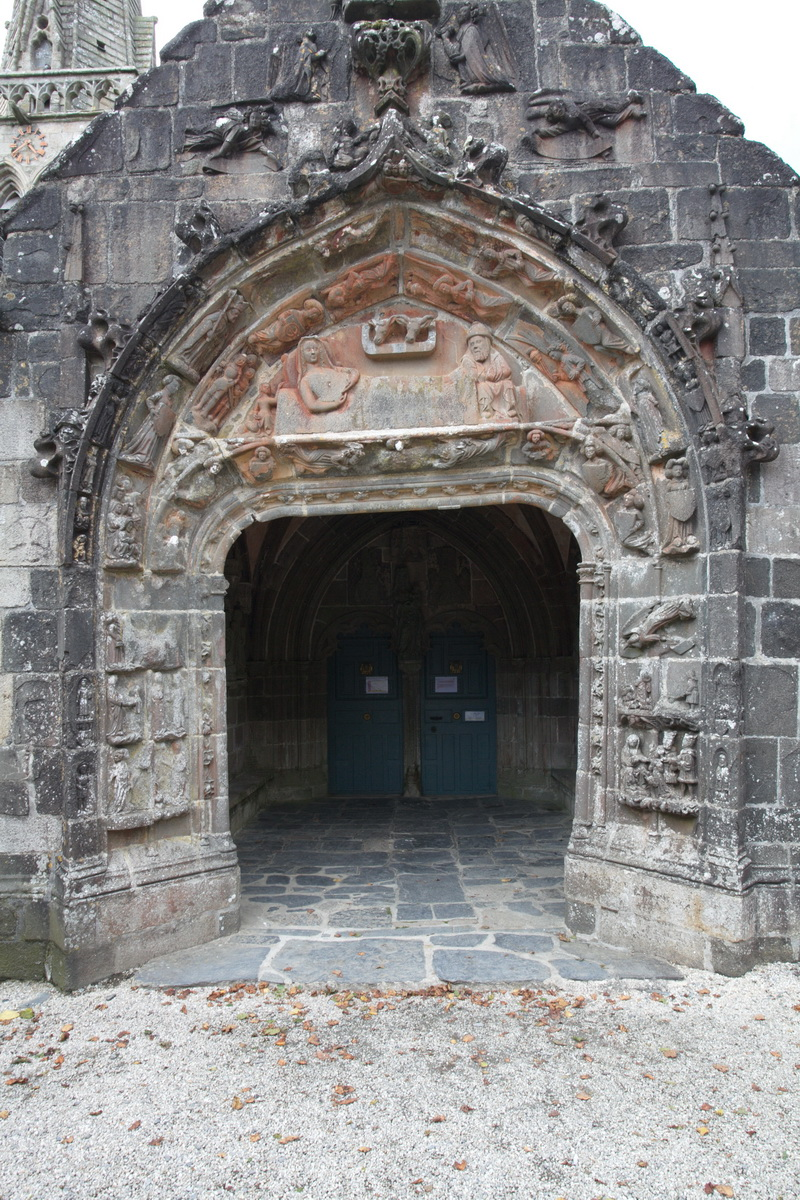
At the top of the porch gable we see two kneeling angels and below them the two "floating" angels. Above the entrance is a tympanum depicting the Nativity. The Virgin Mary lies on a bed with Joseph sat at the foot of the bed. The heads of two cattle peer out from the wall above the Virgin Mary. A previous rector had had the main part of Mary's body chiseled away as it was thought inappropriate. In the voussures and piédroits we can see several angels and other depictions and at the base of the right hand side we can see the depiction of the Adoration of the Magi. At the far end of the porch we can make out the two doors giving access to the church.

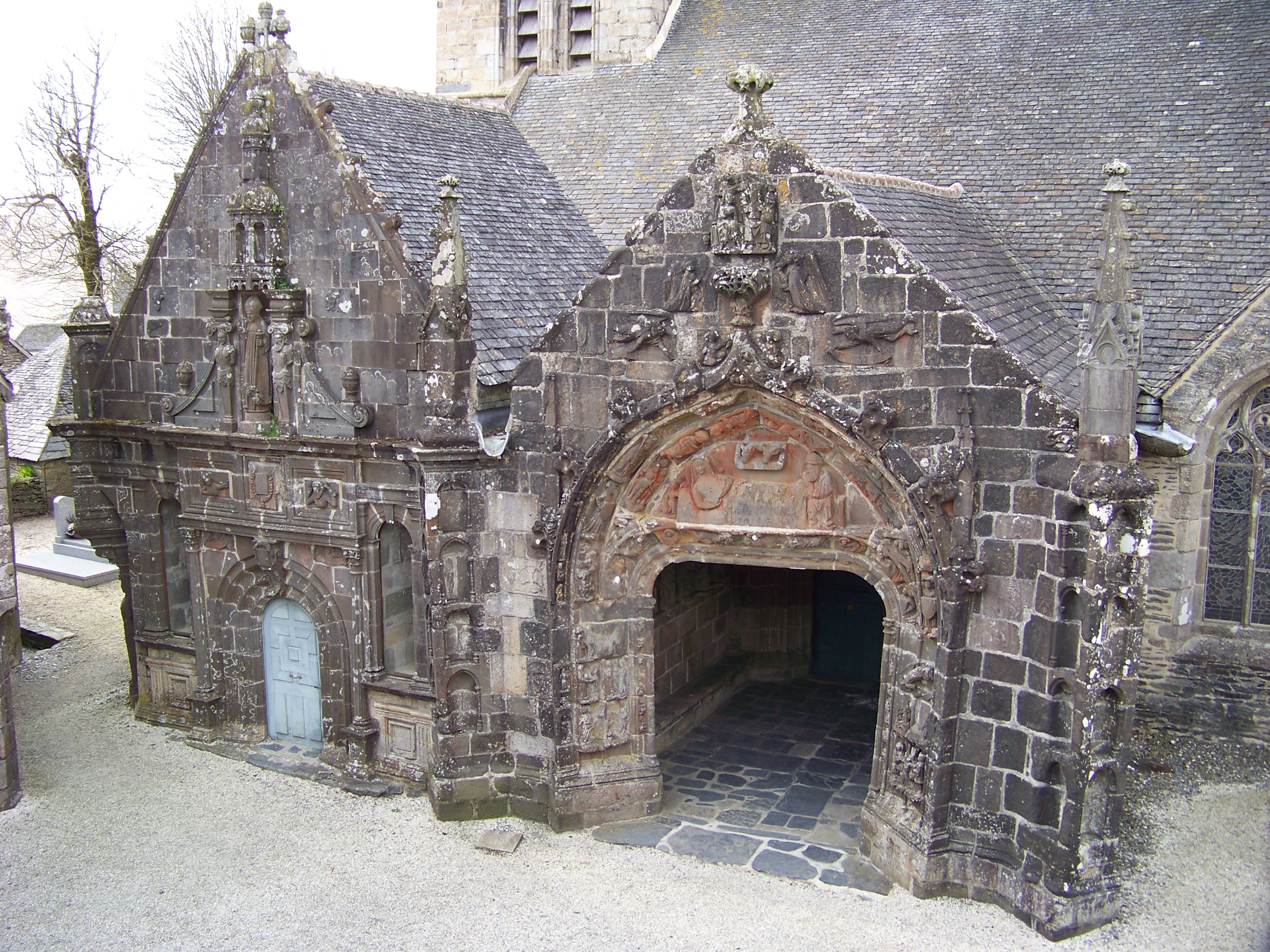
View of the south porch. We see the porch to the right and the two kneeling angels at the top with the two " floating" angels beneath. Above the porch entrance is the tympanum with the Virgin Mary lying on a bed with Joseph at the foot of the bed whilst the heads of two cattle peer out above them. To the left is the ossuary

== The stoup ("Bénitier") in the south porch ==
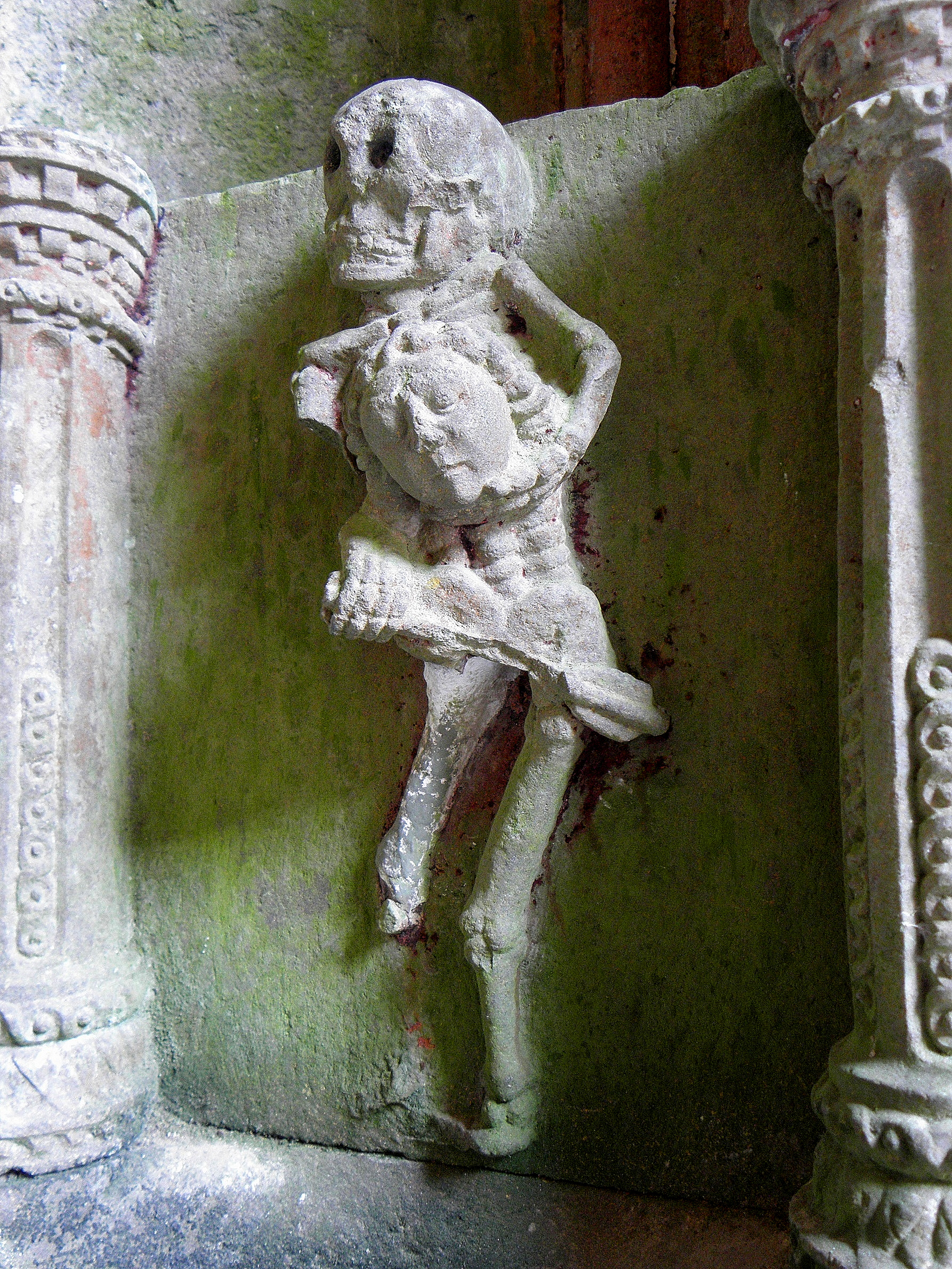
The stoup in the church porch with a depiction of the "Ankou" with arrow. He holds the head of a child.

The Ankou is a mythological personification of death. In his "The Legend of Death", Anatole Le Braz, a 19th-century writer and collector of legends, described the Ankou thus: "The Ankou is the henchman of Death (oberour ar maro) and he is also known as the grave yard watcher who is said to protect the graveyard and the souls of the dead. One description of the ankou is that of a tall, haggard figure with long white hair. He is also depicted as a skeleton and has a revolving head able to see everything everywhere. The Ankou is said to drive a cart and stops at the house of someone who is about to die, ready to take them off.

== Other furnishings ==
- The church's central stained glass window dates to 1535 and is the work of Jost de Negker. That in the north aisle dates to 1562 and shows the Dormition of the Virgin Mary, the Last Judgement, and the Tree of Jesse. The window depicting "La Martyre" holds portraits of René de Rohan and his wife Isabeau d'Albret.
- Inside the church is a baldaquin by Jean Le Moing dating to 1635 and the baptismal font is inscribed ""Yvo Nicolas et C. Maubian Fabriques ont fait faire ce tabernacle par M. Re Jean Moing en lan 1635".
- The pulpit dates to 1740
- The main altar dates to 1706 and was the work of Alain Castel. There is a 17th-century altarpiece placed on a granite altar, dating to the 15th century. The altarpiece depicts the martyrdoms of Saint Sebastian, Saint John and Saint Mémoire.
- Another altarpiece in the south of the church has a painting in the centre depicting an angel helping a lost soul escape from purgatory. Below the painting are three bas-reliefs depicting the martyrdom of Saint Erasmus of Antioch. In niches on either side of the painting are statues of Saint Paul and John the Evangelist. John holds a cup of poison from which a small monster is emerging.

== The sacristy ==
This dates to 1699 and is the final addition to the building.

== Other calvaries near La Martyre ==
The calvary at Kerlavarec dates to 1520. There is a "Vierge de Pitié" on the Calvary as well as statues in ronde bosse and a "Christ lié". That at Poulbroc'h dates to the 16th-century and is 5 metres high. The statues of the Virgin Mary and John the Evangelist have been restored and the back-to-back statues are of the Virgin Mary and Saint Peter, Mary Magdalene and John the Evangelist.

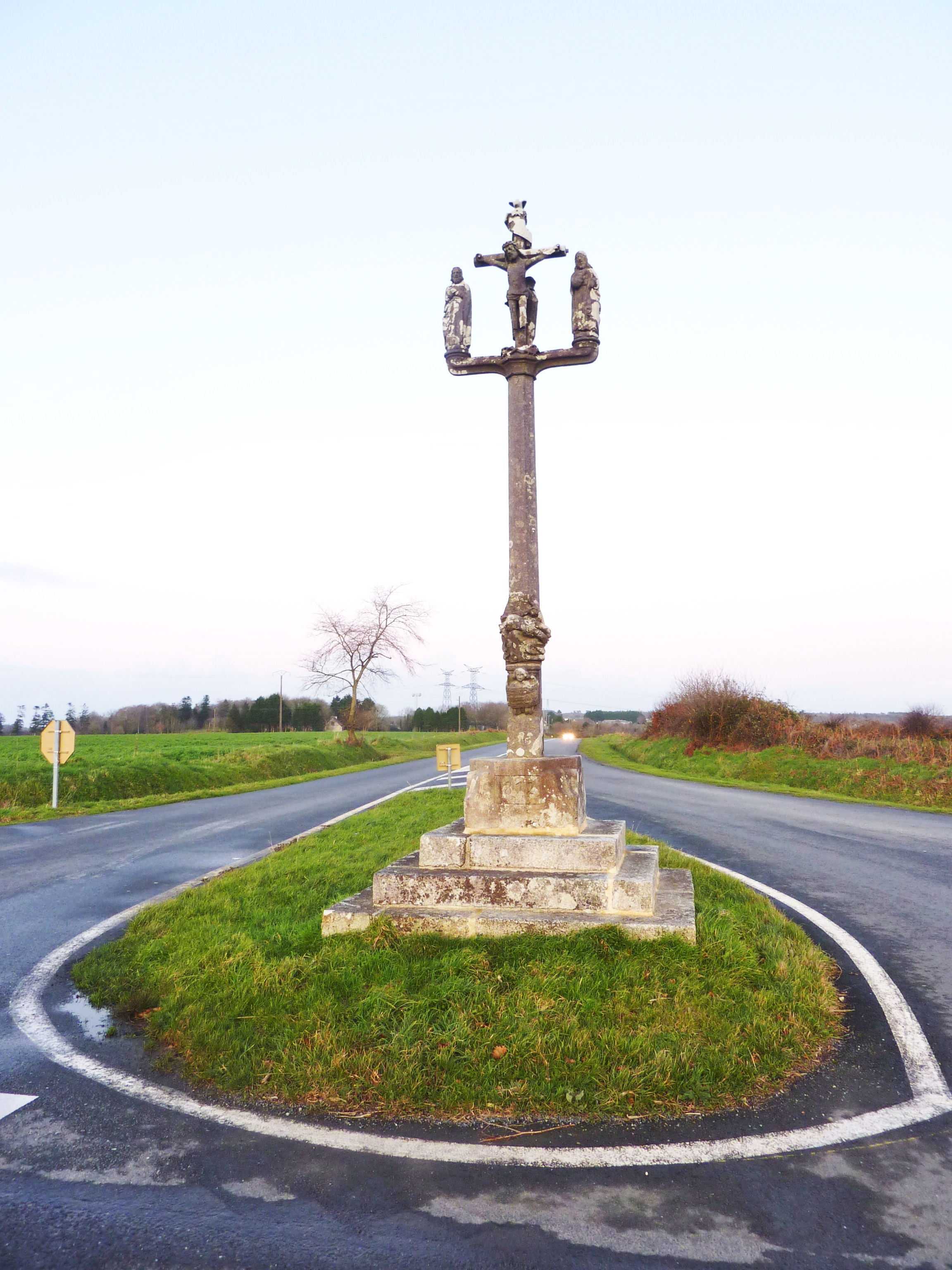
The calvary of Kerlavarec.

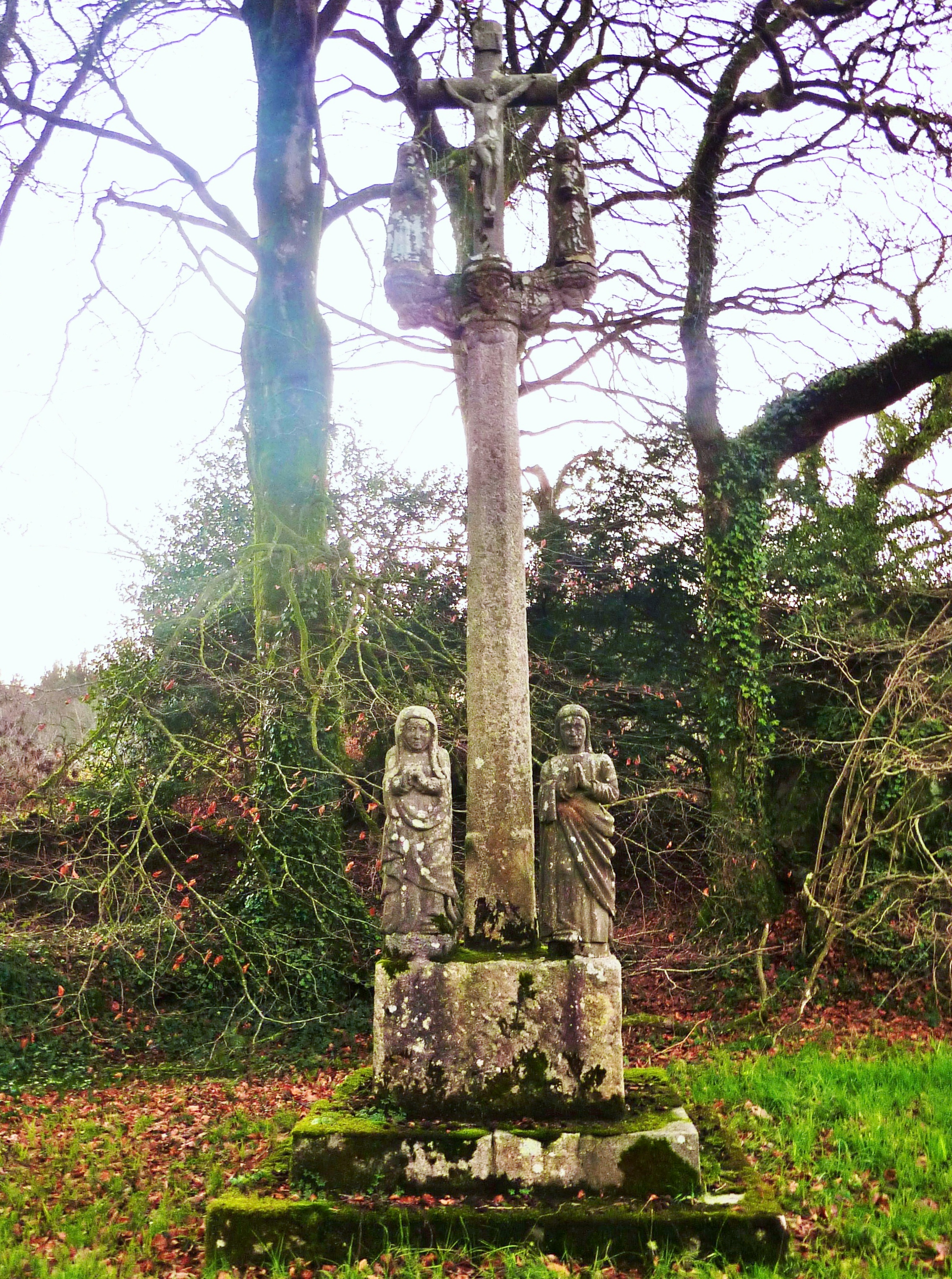
The calvary at Poulbroc'h.

== Gallery of images ==
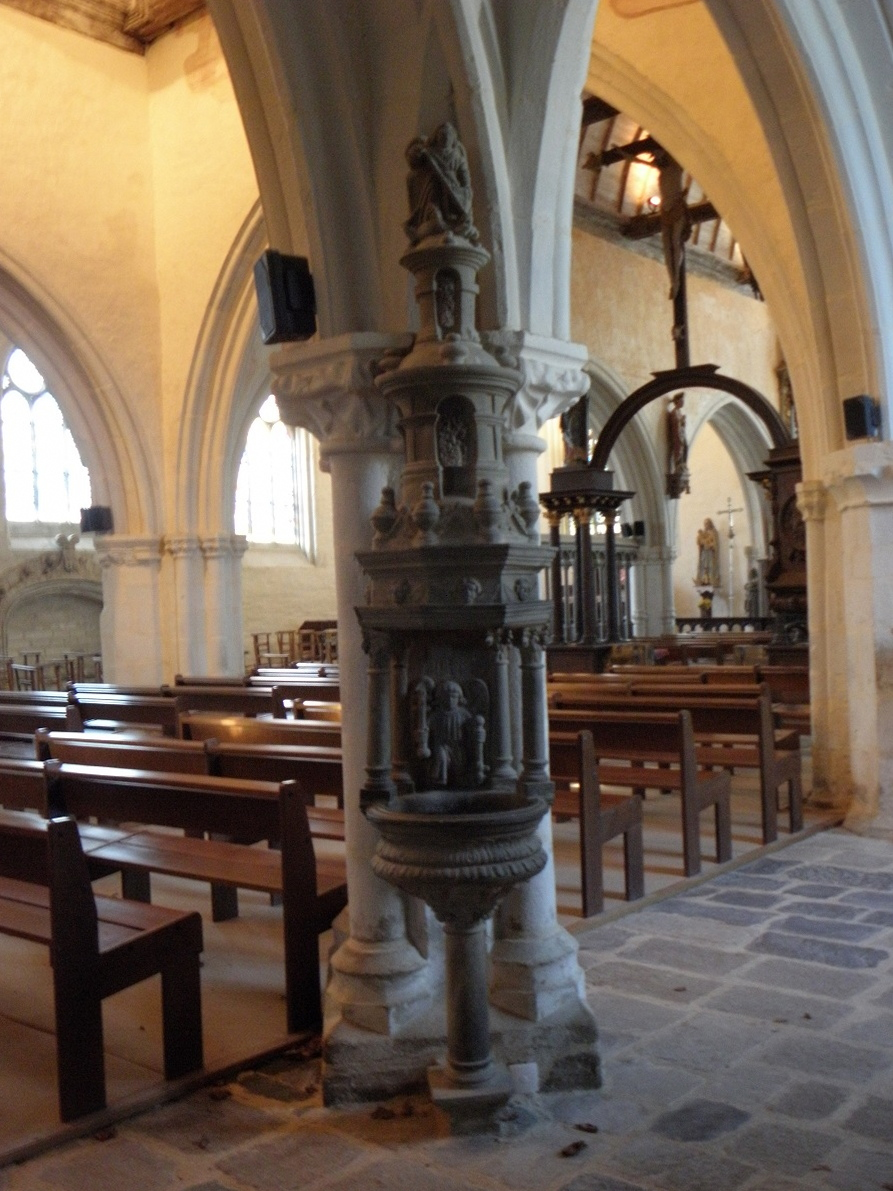
This stoup inside the church has a sculpture at the top depicting Saint Michael fighting the dragon. Over the stoup's basin is a sculpture depicting an angel holding two holy-water sprinklers/aspergillum.("goupillon").

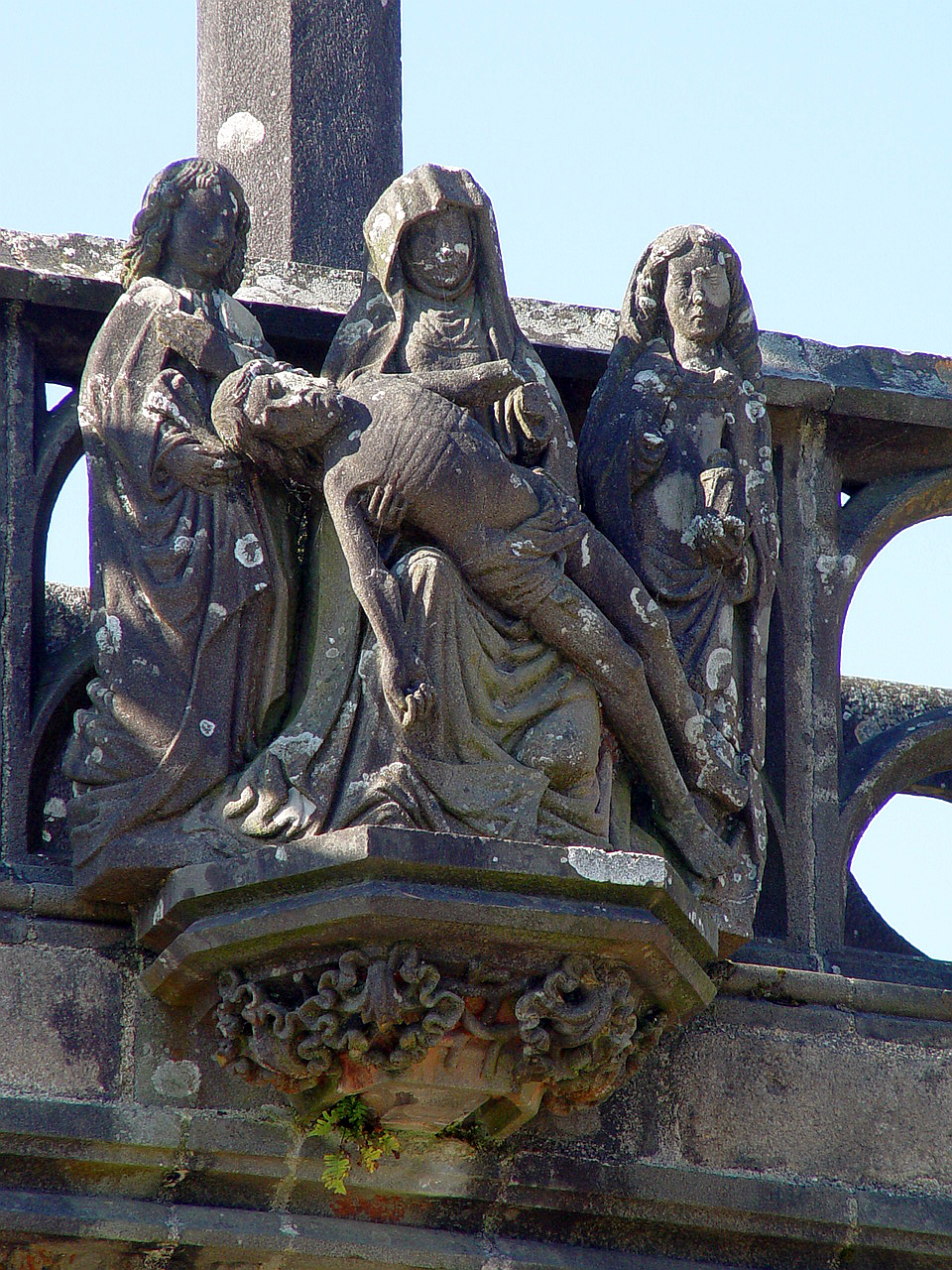
The Pieta positioned in the centre of the three-arched entrance.

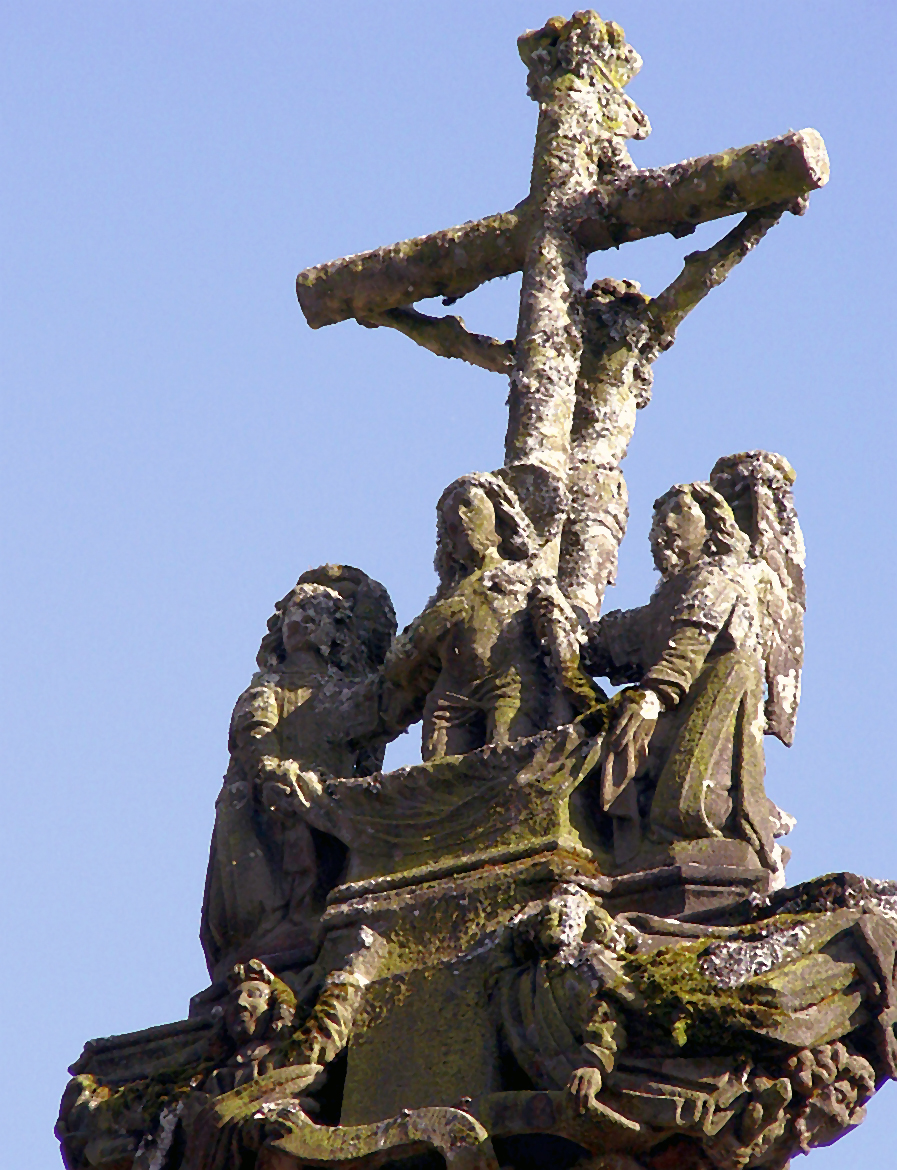
The resurrection. This can be seen on the central cross of the calvary and on the reverse side of the depiction of the crucified Christ. The risen Christ emerges from his tomb.

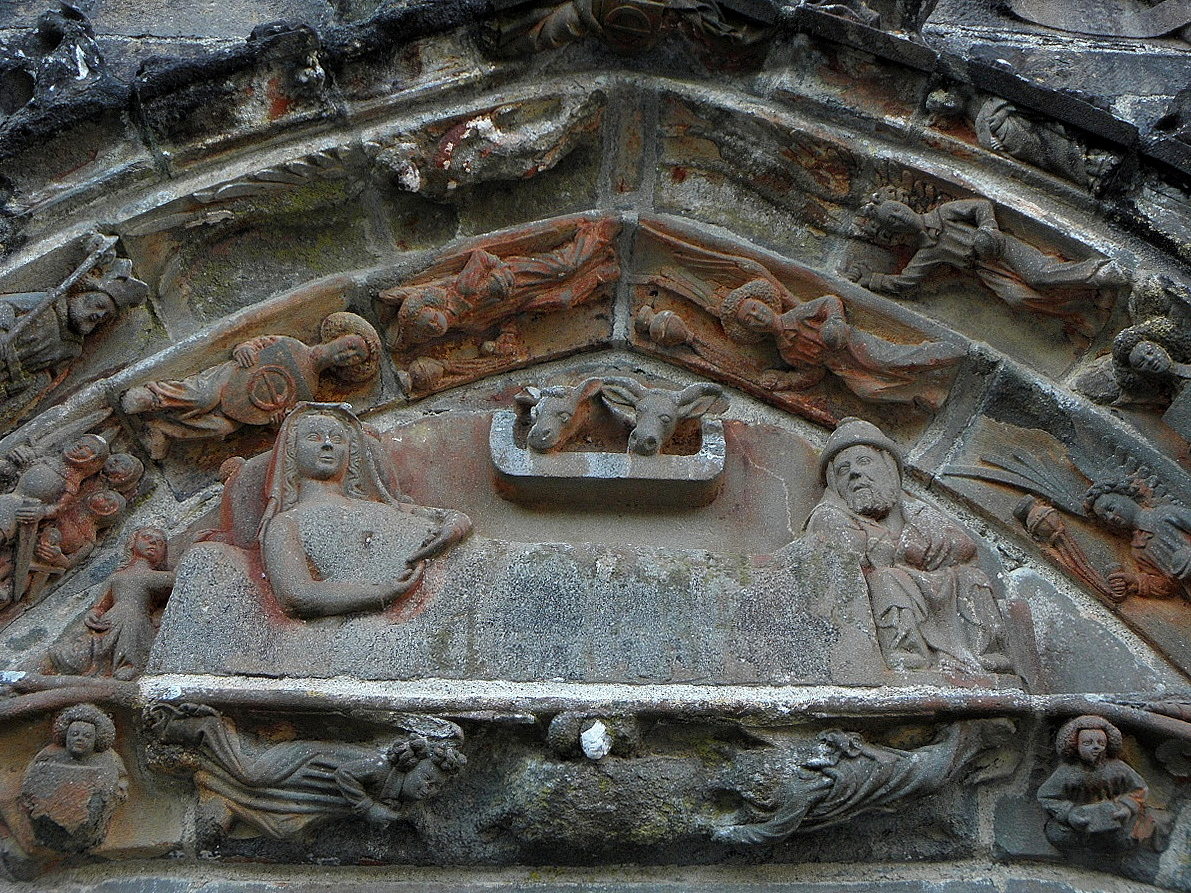
The tympanum over the south porch entrance depicting the nativity.

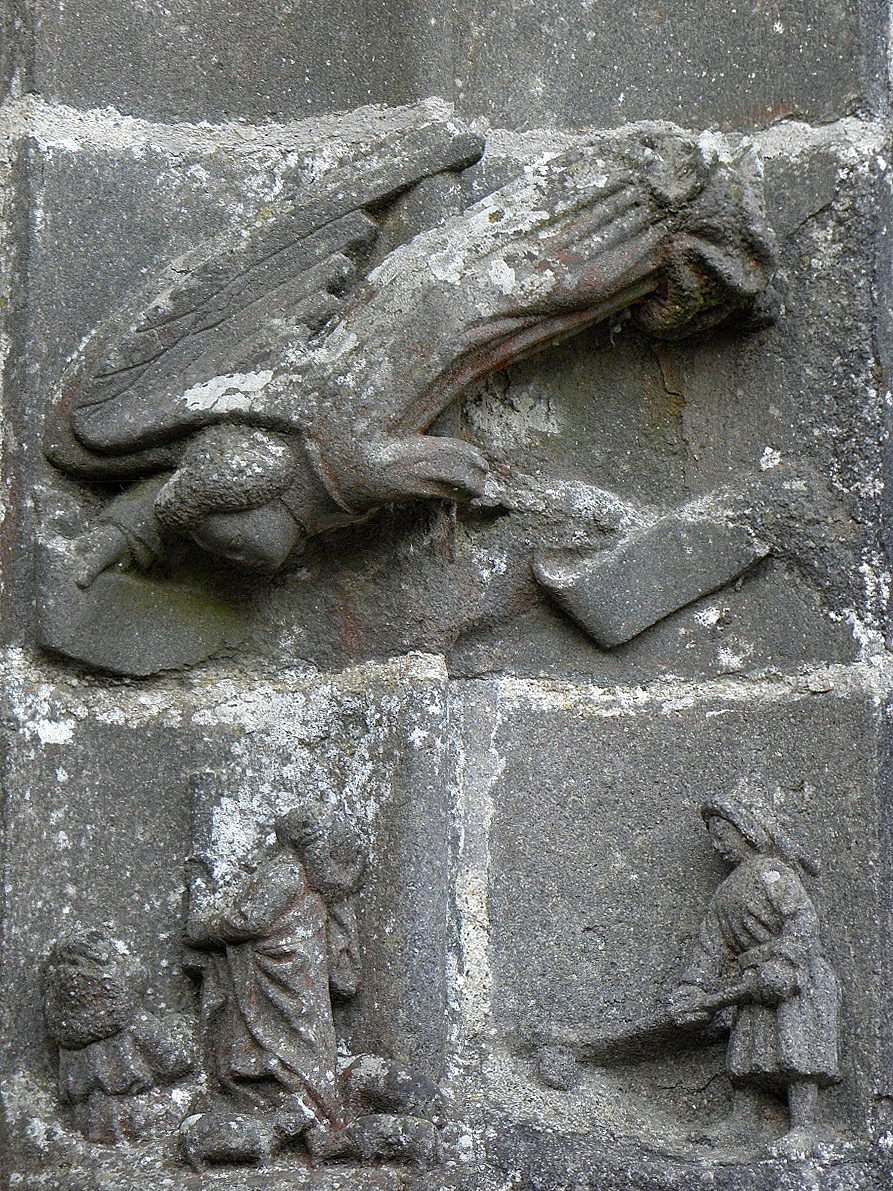
Carving on south porch arch. An angel appears to be diving towards the ground. She holds a phylactery. There are two carvings beneath her. That on the right shows a farmer at work.

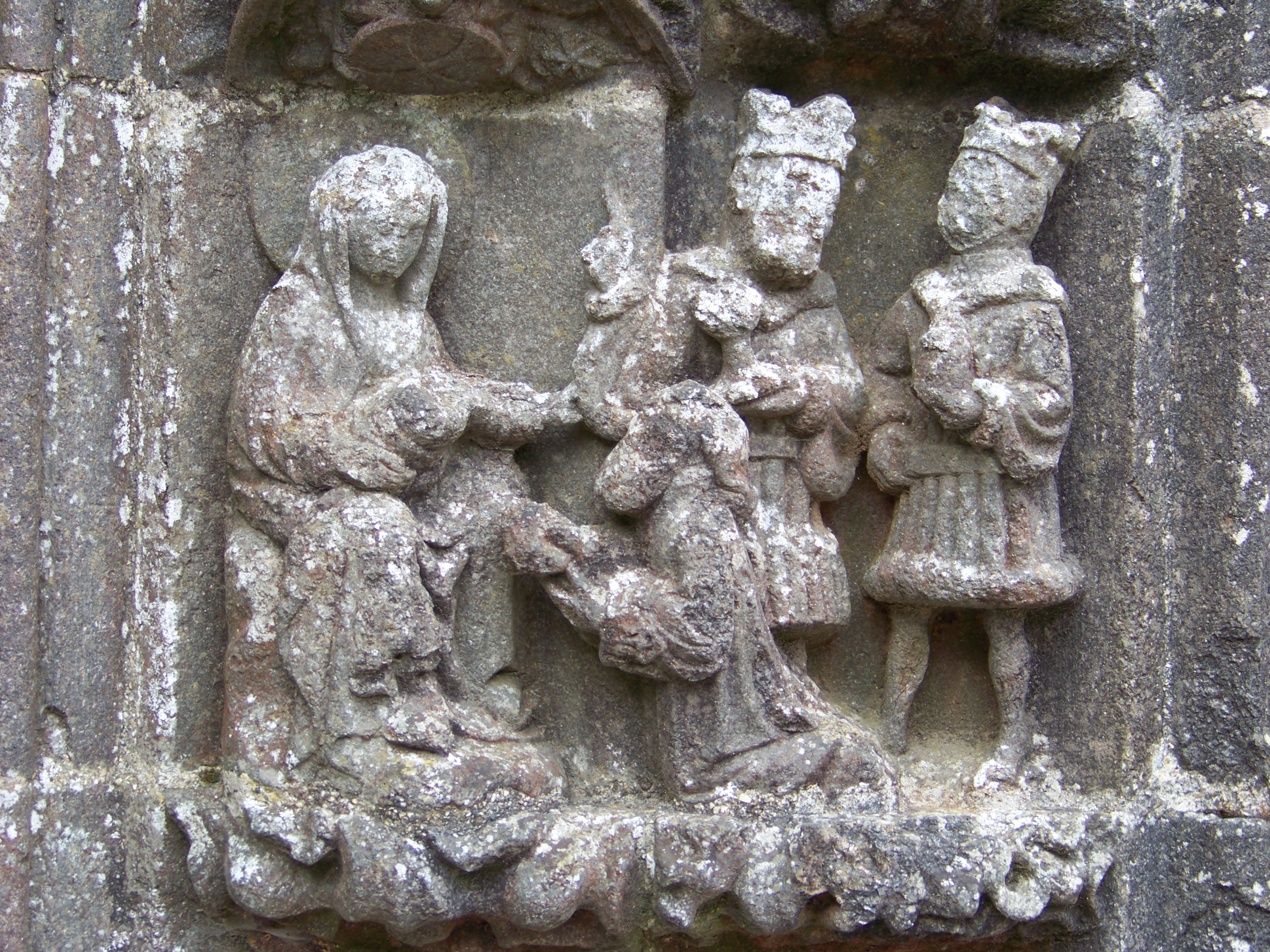
The Adoration of the Magi. One of the reliefs around the porch arch.

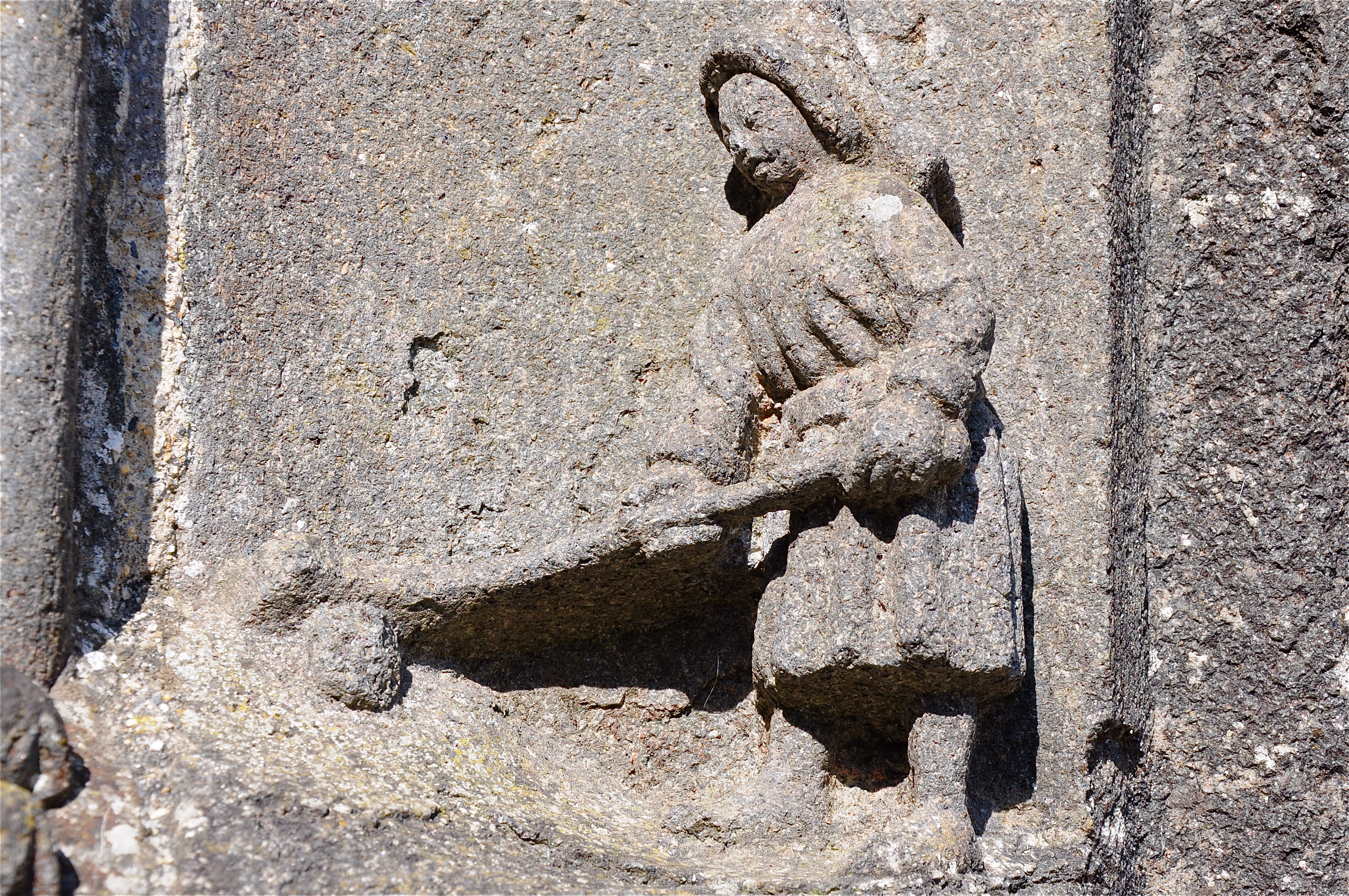
A farmer at work.

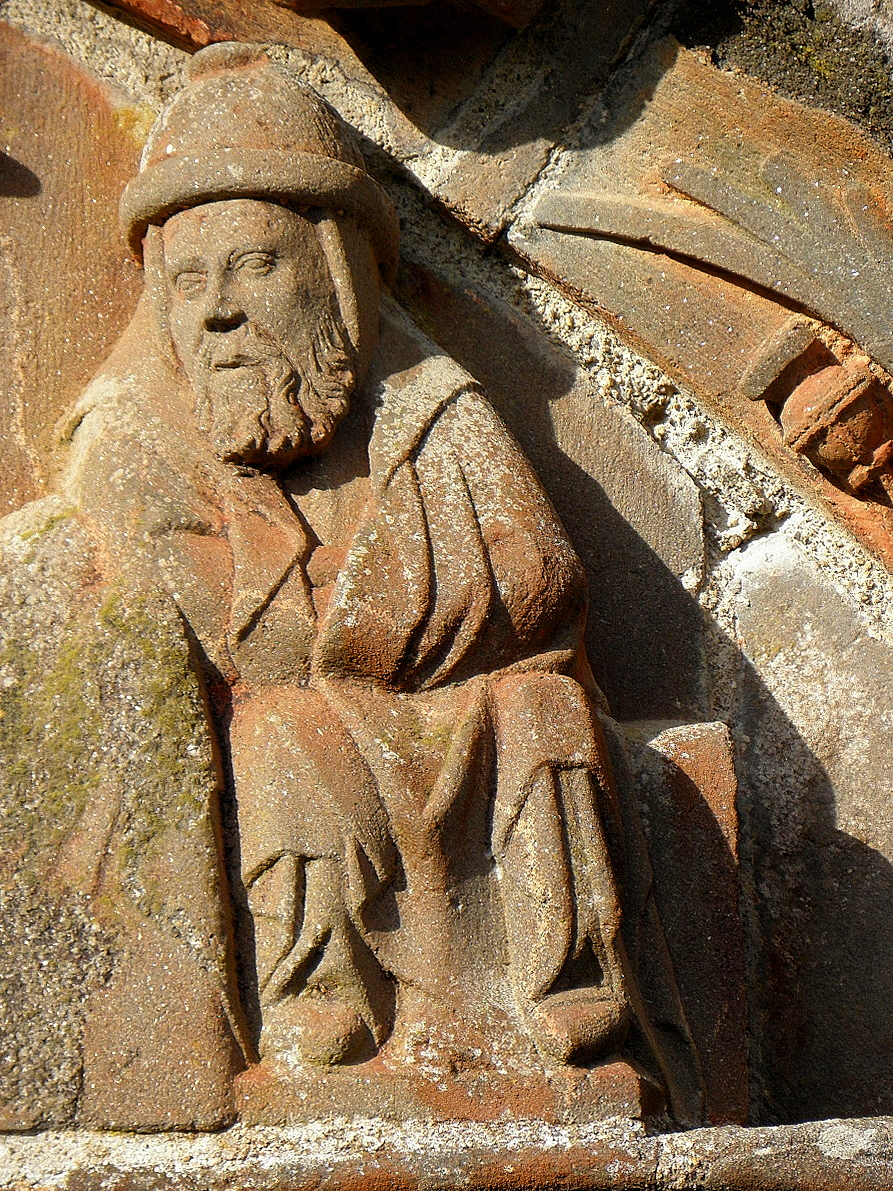
Joseph in the nativity scene in the tympanum over the south porch. He sits at the foot of the Virgin Mary's bed.

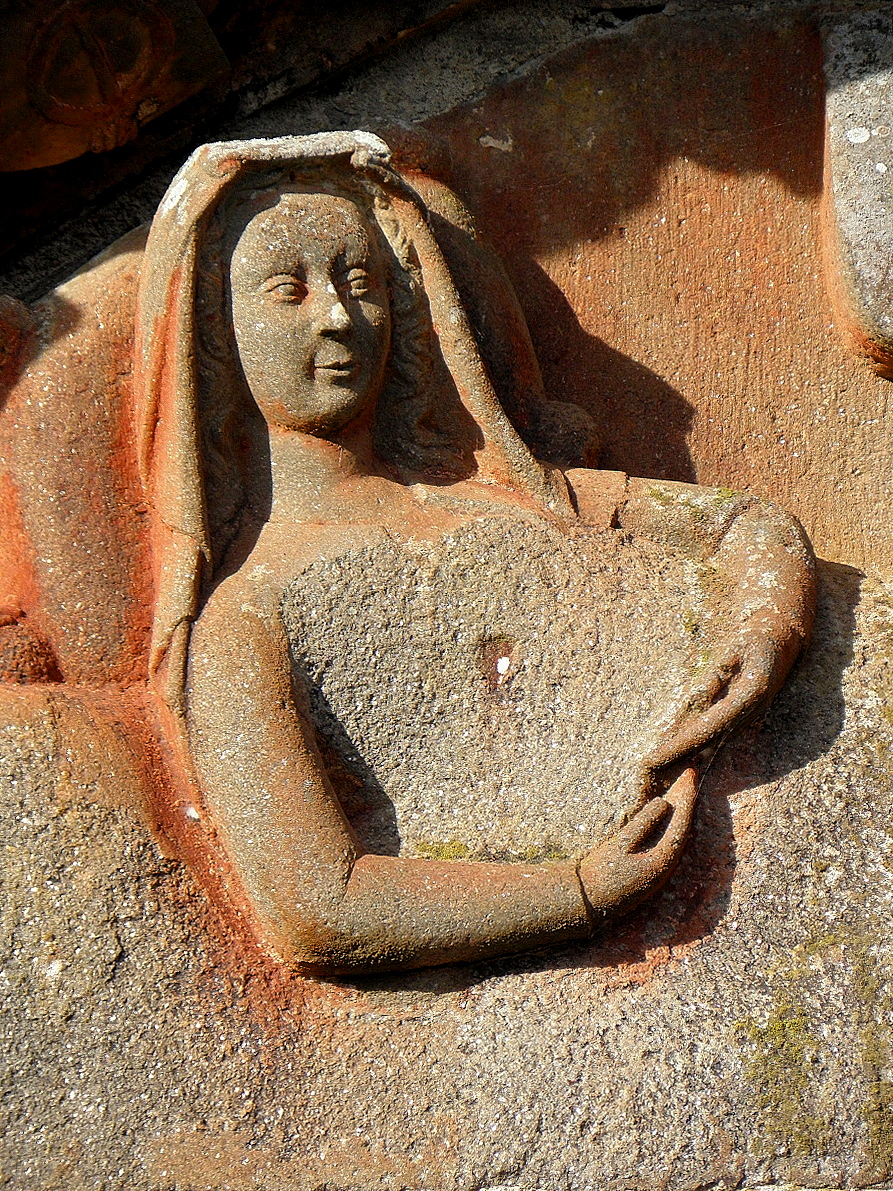
The Virgin Mary in the nativity scene. She lies on a bed with arms across her chest. Most of her body has been chiseled away it is thought by a rector of the church who thought the depiction of her body to be indiscreet.

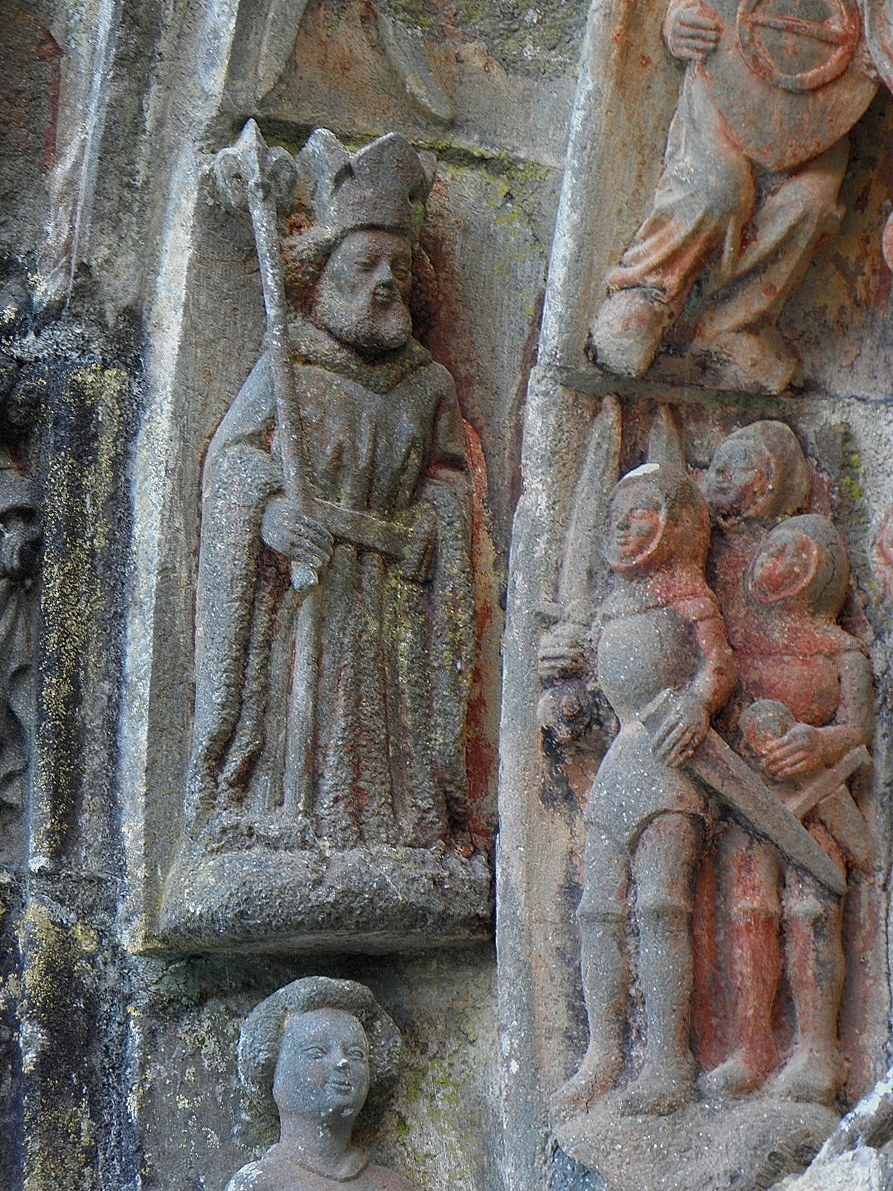
Salomon (or Herod) with a group of soldiers.

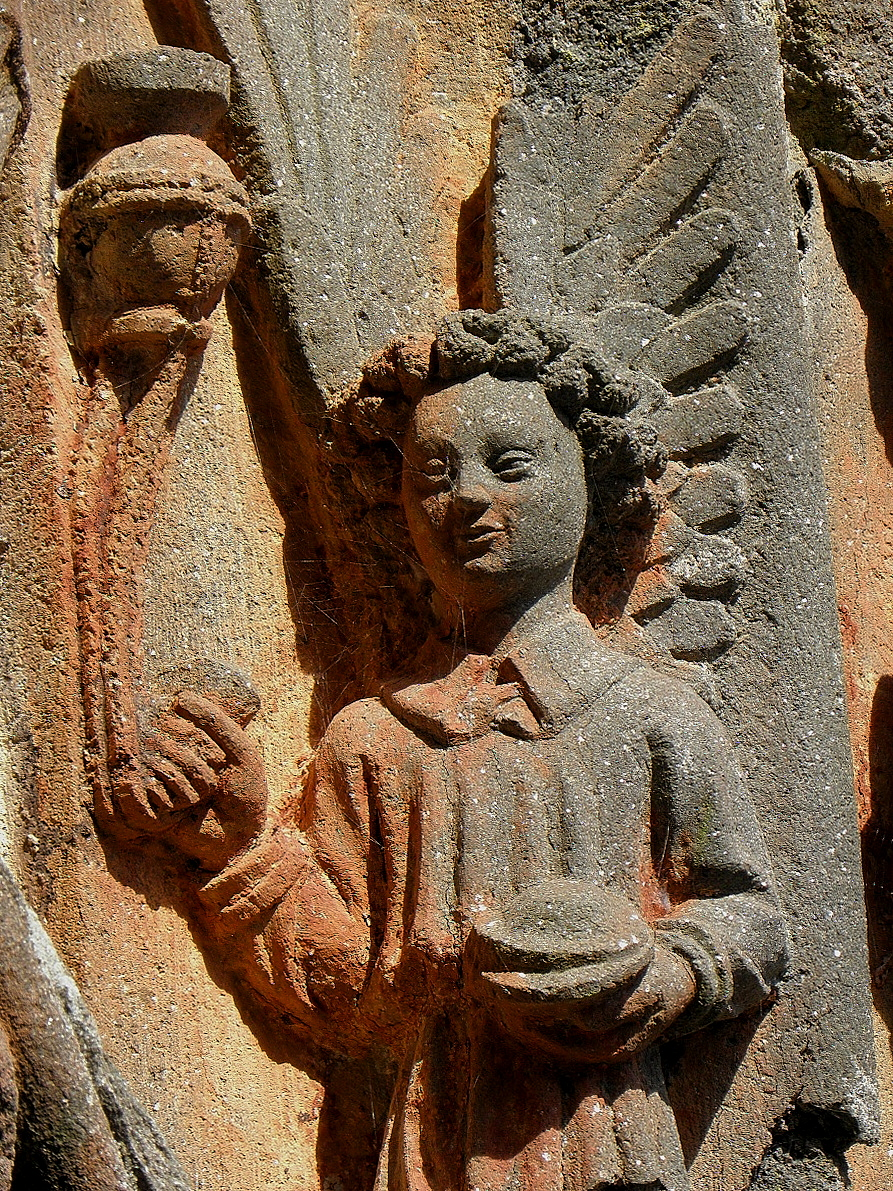
The depiction of an angel by the south porch arch.

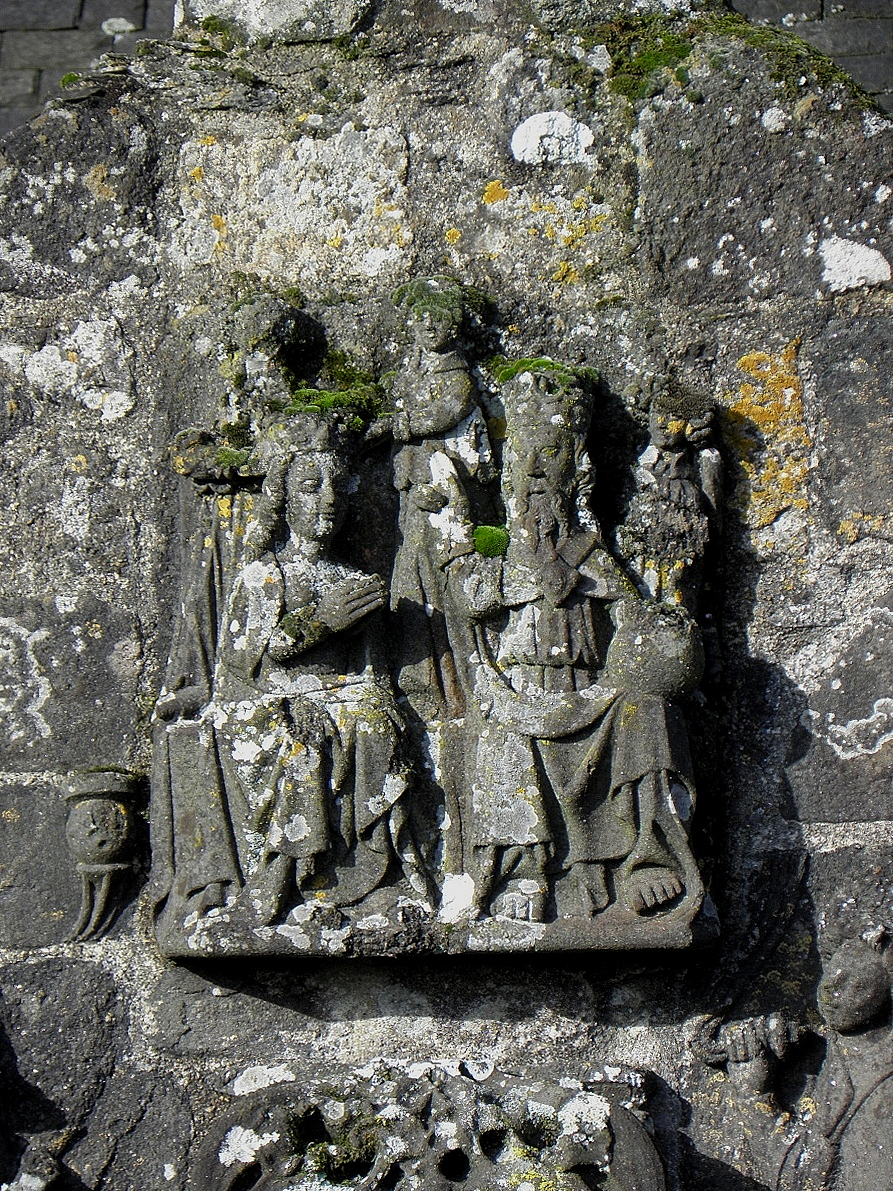
The crowning of the Virgin Mary.

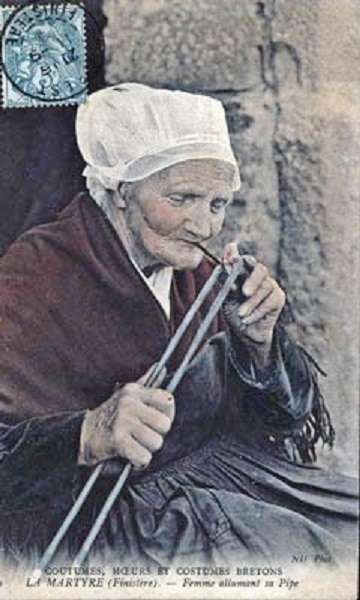
An old photograph of a La Martyre woman smoking a pipe.
