= Chapel of St. Aurelianus, Limoges =

Chapel of St. Aurelianus
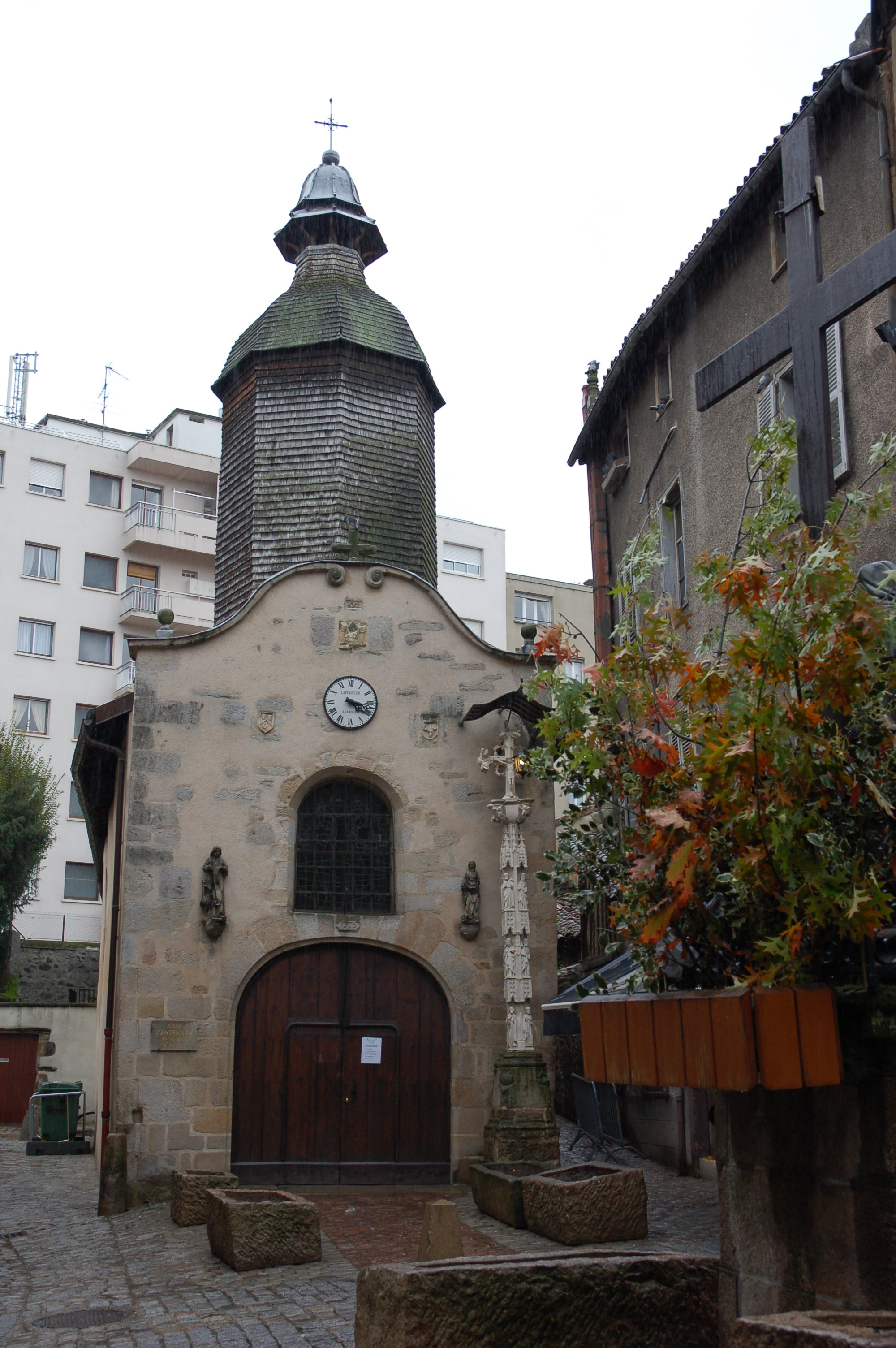

- Location within Nouvelle-Aquitaine
- 45°49′42″N 01°15′26″E
- Type: Roman Catholic chapel
- Location: Rue de la Boucherie, Limoges, Haute-Vienne, France

History
- Built: 15th-17th centuries

Site notes
- Architectural style: Baroque
- Owner: Confrérie de Saint Aurélien

Monument historique
- Official name: Chapelle Saint-Aurélien
- Criteria: Inscrit
- Designated: 28 January 1943
- Reference no.: PA00100334

The Chapel of St. Aurelianus (French: chapelle Saint-Aurélien; Occitan: chapela de Sant Aurelhan) is a 15th and 17th-century chapel that hosts the relics of Saint Aurelianus in Limoges, Haute-Vienne, France. It is an official Historic Monument.

== History ==
The chapel was originally built in 1471 to host the relics of Saint Aurelianus that were located in the ruined church of St. Cessateur (down the Rue des Pénitents-Rouges). In the 17th century, the choir was extended and decorated in the Baroque style. During the French Revolution, the building was sold as a National Good to a member of the Confrérie de Saint Aurélien (Brotherhood of Saint Aurelianus), a brotherhood of butchers. The brotherhood still owns the chapel today. The chapel remains an important worship place for the residents of La Boucherie neighbourhood.

The chapel was listed as a Historic Monument in 1943. In March 2019, the fourteen Stations of the Cross were stolen from the chapel.

== Architecture and decoration ==
The chapel has an onion dome made of chestnut tree shingles.

In spite of its small size, the chapel of St. Aurelianus has rich furniture, among which:

- A 15th-century statue of Saint Catherine;
- A 15th-century group of statues representing Saint Anne and the Virgin Mary with Child Jesus eating what a local tradition says is a kidney.
- A baroque altarpiece whose centre features a painting of the Transfiguration of Jesus. The altarpiece hosts the shrine of Saint Aurelianus.
