= Aureo Castro =

Macanese priest (1917–1993)

Rev. Fr. Aureo Castro Nunes e Castro (1917 – 21 January 1993), better known as Father Aureo Castro, was born at Pico, on Calendaria in the Azores, Portugal. He arrived in Macau on 15 September 1931, where, at the age of 14, he entered the St Joseph Diocesan Seminary, where he studied theory, solfeggio and harmony with the fathers Wilhelm Schmid and Antonio Andre Ngan. He was ordained a priest on 8 September 1943.

Fr. Aureo was professor at the seminary and also a chaplain and vicar of the Macau Cathedral. He was later appointed St Lawrence parish priest and became director of the Catholic weekly newspaper O Clarim. Other posts held by Fr. Aureo included professor of choral singing and professor of \religion and morals at the Liceu and the Pedro Nolasco Commercial School.

In 1951, Fr. Aureo went to Lisbon to study music at the National Conservatory, where he also studied voice and piano with Biermann, Arminda Correia and Croner de Vasconcelos (1910–1974). He was also assistant to the Portuguese conductor and musicologist Mario Sampayo Ribeiro (1898–1966) in the choir of the University of Lisbon. He graduated with a distinction in Music Composition in 1958. While he lived in Portugal, he completed the "Sonata No 1, Tres Conrais Melodias Gregorianas", "Sonata No 2, Sonatina no1" and "Sonatina no2. His Te Deum" for choir and organ. They premiered at the church of Sao Joao de Deus, Lisbon. Returning to Macau, he promoted religious singing and founded the "Grupo Coral Polifonico" in 1959. In 1962, along with Father Cesar Brianza, he founded the "Academia de Música São Pio X" of which he became Director.

"Dancas da Siu Mui Mui", a piano suite for children, was composed in 1967-68 and published in Hong Kong in 1971.

Besides academic studies, the Academia de Música São Pio X organized public concerts, free of charge, and invited many internationally famous musicians to give concerts in Macau.

In 1983, he founded the Macau Chamber Orchestra with British composer Stuart Bonner and a group of friends. The members of the orchestra were amateur musicians and music teachers from the Academy, which was later incorporated to the Macau Cultural Institute.

Fr. Aureo dedicated his life to the promotion of music and his talents as teacher and composer are widely recognized. Today, students from the Academia can be found in Portugal, France, Switzerland, Australia, USA and Canada. In 1987 and 1990, he was twice decorated by the Macau Government with the Medal of Cultural Merit.

Fr. Aureo died on 21 January 1993, aged 76, at the Complexo Hospitalar Conde de S. Januario, and was buried at the Cemetery of Sao Miguel Arcanjo.

== Works ==
- Aurei Carmina-Pianoforte e Organo (Copyright of Cioecesis Macaonensis)
- Aurei Carmina-Choro (Copyright of Cioecesis Macaonensis)
- Some other Symphonies which remained unpublished today.
