= Aurelio =

Aurelio may refer to:

== People ==
=== A ===
- Aurelio Andreazzoli (born 1953), Italian football coach and manager
- Fábio Aurélio (born 1979), Brazilian footballer
- Salvatore Aurelio (born 1986), Italian footballer
- Marcus Aurélio (born 1973), Brazilian mixed martial arts fighter

=== C ===
- Aurelio Costarella (c.1965–2025), Australian fashion designer

=== D ===
- Aurelio Díaz (boxer) (born 1923), Spanish welterweight boxer
- Aurelio Domínguez (1896–1971), Chilean footballer

=== E ===
- Aurelio Macedonio Espinosa Jr. (1907–2004), professor of linguistics and folklore
- Aurelio Macedonio Espinosa Sr. (1880–1958), professor of folklore and philology

=== F ===
- Aurelio Fierro (1923–2005), Italian actor and singer

=== G ===
- José Aurelio Gay (born 1965), Spanish footballer and manager
- Aurelio Genghini (1907–2001), Italian long-distance runner
- Aurelio González (boxer) (born 1939), Argentine boxer
- Aurelio González (footballer) (1905–1997), Paraguayan footballer
- Aurelio González Puente (born 1940), Spanish road racing cyclist
- Aurelio D. Gonzales Jr. (born 1964), congressman in the Philippines

=== H ===
- Aurélio Buarque de Holanda Ferreira (1910–1989), Brazilian lexicographer

=== L ===
- Aurelio Lampredi (1917–1989), Italian automobile and aircraft engine designer
- Aurelio López (1948–1992), Mexican professional baseball player

=== M ===
- Aurelio Martínez (1969–2025), Honduran politician
- Aurelio Martínez (1969–2025), Honduran musician who sings in the Garifuna language
- Aurelio Menegazzi (1900–1979), Italian racing cyclist
- Aurelio Monteagudo (1943–1990), pitcher who played in Major League Baseball
- Aurelio Mosquera (1883–1939), President of Ecuador

=== P ===
- Aurelio Padovani (1889–1926), Italian fascist
- Marcos Aurelio Di Paulo (1920–1996), Argentine footballer who played for FC Barcelona
- Aurélio Pereira (1947–2025), Portuguese football coach and youth player scout

=== R ===
- Aurelio Rodríguez (1947–2000), Mexican professional baseball player

=== S ===
- Aurelio Sabattani (1912–2003), Italian prelate of the Roman Catholic Church
- Aurelio Sousa Matute (1860–1925), Peruvian lawyer and politician

=== T ===
- Aurélio de Lira Tavares (1905–1998), President of Brazil

=== V ===
- Aurelio Vidmar (born 1967), Australian footballer
- Aurelio Voltaire (born 1967), Cuban-American musician

== Fictional characters ==
- Aurelio Casillas, the protagonist of the American TV series El Señor de los Cielos
- Aurelio Zen, a principal character in the works of Michael Dibdin
- Aurelio Rosas-Sanchez, a secondary antagonist in Man on Fire (2004 film)
- Aurelio, a character in John Wick

== Other uses ==
- Aurélio Dictionary, a dictionary of the Portuguese language, published in Brazil
- Aurelio, San Jose, a place in the Philippines

== See also ==
- Aurelia (gens)
- Aurelius (disambiguation)
- Marco Aurélio, a Spanish or Portuguese given name
