= Abraham Aurelius =

English pastor

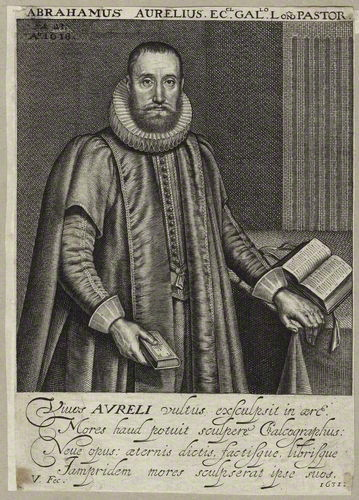
- 1631 engraving of Abraham Aurelius by Robert van Voerst
- Born: 1575
- Died: 1632 (aged 56–57)
- Occupation: Protestant minister

Abraham Aurelius (1575 – 1632) was an English pastor of the French Protestant church in London.

He was a son of John Baptist Aurelius, also a Protestant minister, probably in London, where Abraham was born. He studied at Leyden, in the Low Countries, and took his degree there in 1596. He kept up a correspondence with Gerardus Vossius.

In 1613, on the occasion of the marriage of Frederick V, count palatine, and Elizabeth, daughter of James I, he published a Latin epithalamium. He died in the beginning of 1632, whilst his Latin paraphrase on the Book of Job was in the press; the dedication of the work to Albert Joachim, Belgian ambassador at the Court of St. James, bears his signature, but the paraphrase itself is preceded by some Latin verses in praise of the deceased pastor.
