= Aurelian (disambiguation) =

Aurelian was Roman emperor from 270 to 275.

Aurelian may also refer to:

== People ==
- "Aurelian" is the adjectival form of Aurelius and often refers to the emperor Marcus Aurelius (r. 161–180).
- Aurelian of Limoges, 2nd bishop of Limoges
- Paul Aurelian, 6th century Welsh saint
- Aurelian of Réôme (fl. 840–850), 9th century Frankish music-theorist
- Aurelian Smith, professional wrestler known as Grizzly Smith (1932–2010)
- Aurelian Smith, Jr., his son, professional wrestler known as Jake Roberts (b. 1955)

== Other uses ==
- Aurelian (entomology), archaic term for lepidopterist
- "The Aurelian", a 1930 short story by Vladimir Nabokov
- Aurelians, an alien race in the video game Advent Rising
- Lorgar Aurelian, primarch of the Word Bearers in the fictional Warhammer 40000 universe
- Aurelian, an age in the European land mammal age system, corresponding to the late Middle Pleistocene and Late Pleistocene

== See also ==
- Aurelianus (disambiguation)
- Aurelius (disambiguation)
