= Aureli =

Aureli is an Italian surname derived from the given name Aurelio. Notable people with this surname include:

- Andrea Aureli (born 1983), Italian actor
- Aurelio Aureli (c. 1652–1708), Italian librettist
- Cesare Aureli (1844–1923), Italian sculptor and writer
- Emanuela Aureli (born 1973), Italian comedian and impressionist
- Giuseppe Aureli (1858–1929), Italian painter and watercolourist
- Ludovico Aureli (1592–1637), Italian man of letters and historian
- Raniero Aureli (1885–1975), Italian painter and watercolourist

== See also ==
- Aurelii, a Roman gens
