= Academia de Música São Pio X =

Coordinates: 22.192639°N 113.544194°E

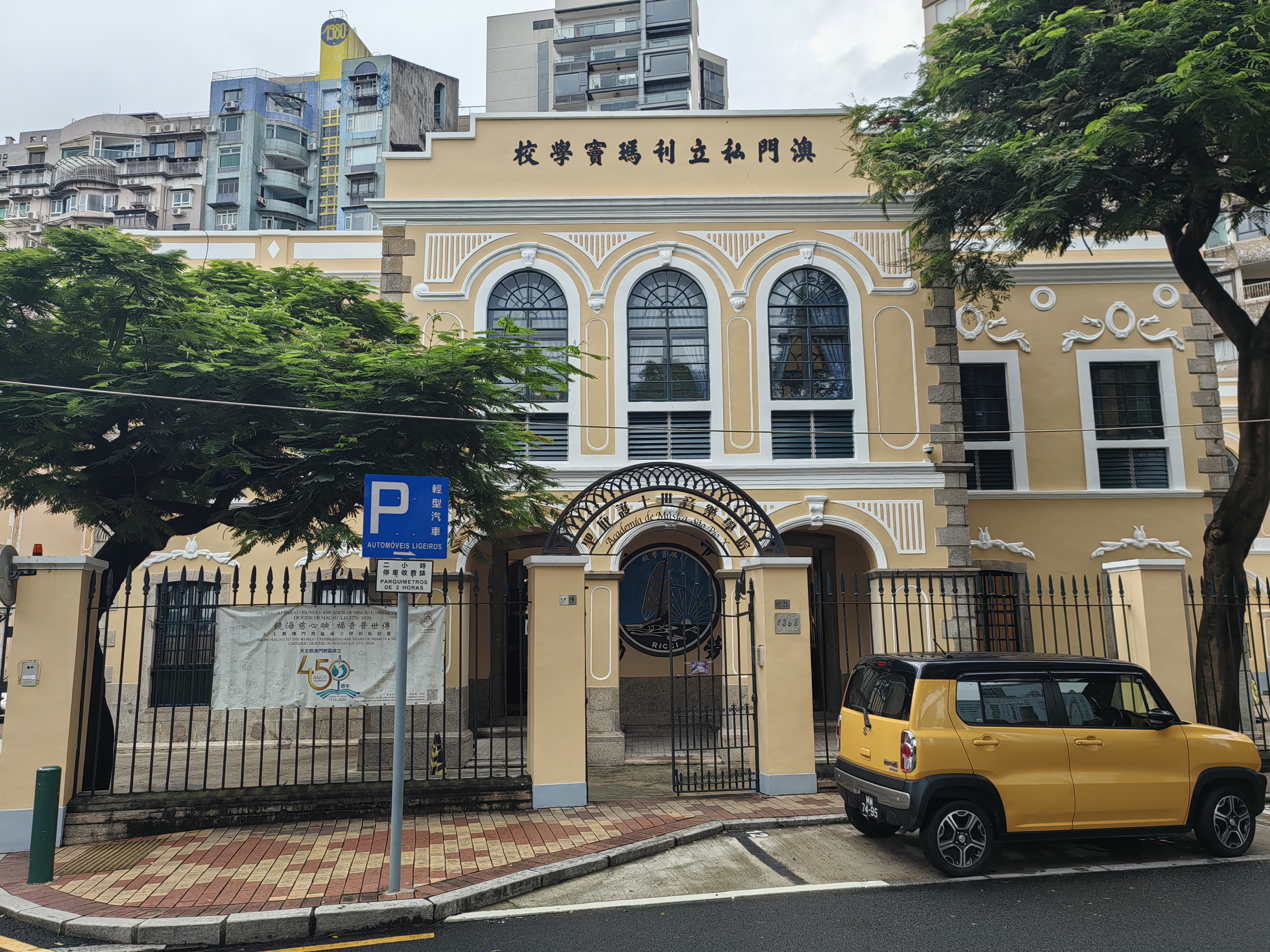
- Macau; China

Information
- Type: Private
- Established: 1962
- Priest: Lancelote Miguel Rodrigues
- Faculty: 10
- Enrollment: 121

Academia de Música São Pio X is a multi-lingual music school founded by the priest Áureo Castro in 1962, under the suggestion of the director of the Lisbon National Conservatory. Its original name was "Escola das Missões Católicas" (lit. "School of the Catholic Missions"), and the school opened its doors on 2 October with 48 enrolled students. Its initial staff was composed by Cesare Brianza (piano), Maria de Lurdes Ruas Freire Garcia (piano), António Freire Garcia (violin), Marcos Lau and two other unidentified teachers, known as Liang e Chao.

In 1975, bishop Macau, D. Arquimínio da Costa authorized an expansion of the school using funds from the government. Governor António Lopes dos Santos also started conceding a mensal allowance for it, alleging it was "a private institution of cultural value, considered to be of utility to the province" (in Portuguese: "Uma instituição particular de carácter cultural, considerada de utilidade para a Província").

According to the words of Áureo Castro, "the academy was founded with the purpose of giving young men from Macau, Portuguese and Chinese, a gradually progressive musical institution. So there was the need of using a bilingual educational system, using Portuguese and Chinese; and later also English. Of the many students that were taught by the academy, at least three dozen proceeded with their musical studies, graduating in diverse music colleges. Several also now live in Canada, United States, Hong Kong and Australia." (adapted, see footnotes for lit.)
