= Aurelianus (conspirator) =

Ancient Roman man of the 3rd century CE

Aurelianus was a politician and senator of ancient Rome, who lived in the 3rd century CE and was a suffect consul in 182 CE. He was mentioned twice by the 3rd-century historian Cassius Dio, and is supposed to have been one of the conspirators against the murdered Roman emperor Caracalla. He also appears in the text of the Historia Augusta as "Reanus" or "Retianus".

The soldiers demanded him from Macrinus, another conspirator who would go on to become Caracalla's successor as emperor, who at first refused their request, as Aurelianus was ostensibly untouchable as a senator. It is unclear why this demand was made. Possibly because of Aurelianus's machinations, or possibly he had been unpopular in previous military campaigns, perhaps an excessive disciplinarian. At length Macrinus relented, and yielded him up to the mob and he was executed.

Modern scholars speculate that this was in part because Macrinus believed Aurelianus to be a threat to his own sovereignty. In any case, the soldiers' discontent needed an outlet, and it was in Macrinus's interest that their anger not be directed toward him.
