= Robert van Voerst =

17th century Dutch engraver

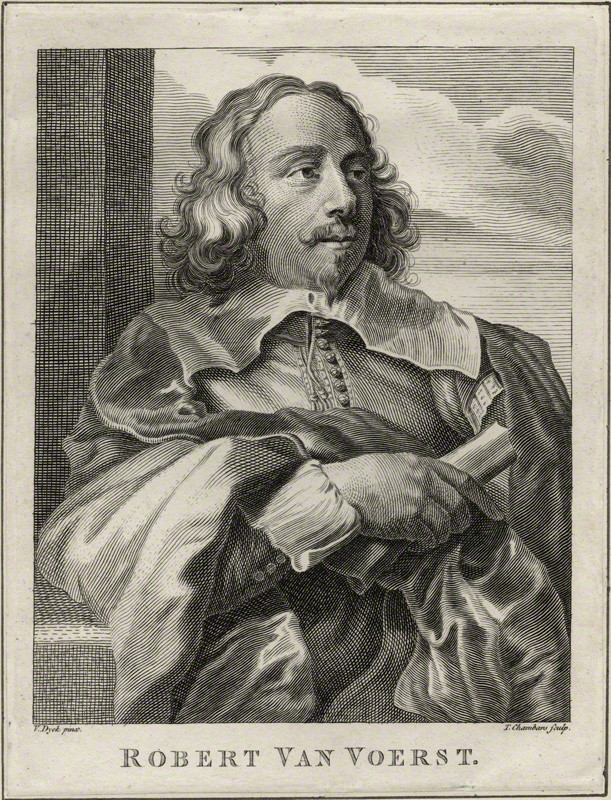
Line engraving of Robert van Voerst by Thomas Chambers, after Sir Anthony van Dyck

Robert van Voerst (bapt. 8 December 1597 – before October 1636) was a Dutch engraver.

He was born in Deventer, and studied under Crispin van de Passe. He arrived in England in 1628 and soon afterwards Charles I of England appointed him his royal engraver. He principally reproduced works by Anthony van Dyck, also active in the British court, who gave van Voerst the exclusive commission on reproducing his portraits. He died in London.
