= Aurelius (disambiguation) =

Aurelius may refer to members of the ancient Roman plebeian family Aurelia gens, especially Emperor Marcus Aurelius.

It may also refer to:

== People ==
=== Given name ===
- Aurelius Zoticus (fl. c. 219–221), cubicularius and male lover of the young Roman emperor Elagabalus
- Aurelius Achilleus (fl. 297–298), a rebel against the Roman emperor Diocletian in Egypt in 297
- Aurelius Celsinus (fl. 341–351), a politician of the Roman Empire
- Aurelius Augustinus (354-430), known as Augustine of Hippo; Christian saint whose writings influenced the development of Western philosophy and Western Christianity
- Aurelius of Carthage (died c. 430), Christian saint
- Ambrosius Aurelianus (fl. 400s, also known as Aurelius Ambrosius, Romano-British military leader, later transformed by Geoffrey of Monmouth into the uncle of King Arthur
- Aurelius Conanus (fl. 500s, Brittonic king in 6th-century sub-Roman Britain
- Aurelius of Asturias (c. 740–774), King of Asturias from 768 to 774
- Aurelius of Córdoba (died 852), Christian martyr, one of the 48 Martyrs of Córdoba
- Aurelius Dwight Parker (1802–1875), American politician from Massachusetts
- Aurelius O. Carpenter (1836–1919), American photographer, writer and abolitionist
- Aurelius Battaglia (1910–1984) was an American children's book illustrator, muralist, writer and director, credited as one of the writers of Disney's Pinocchio

=== Surname ===
- Abraham Aurelius (1575–1632), English Protestant pastor in London

== Places in the United States ==
- Aurelius, New York, a town
- Aurelius Township, Michigan, also an unincorporated community in the township
- Aurelius Township, Washington County, Ohio

== Other uses ==
- Aurelius (horse) (foaled 1958), Irish Thoroughbred racehorse and sire
- Pons Aurelius, an ancient Roman bridge in Rome

== See also ==
- Aurelia (disambiguation)
- Aurelian (disambiguation)
- Aurelianus (disambiguation)
