= Áureo Malinverni =

Brazilian footballer

Áureo
Personal information
- Full name: Áureo Agostinho Arruda Malinverni
- Date of birth: 26 December 1933
- Place of birth: Lages, Brazil
- Date of death: 17 May 2023 (aged 89)
- Place of death: Florianópolis, Brazil
- Height: 1.88 m (6 ft 2 in)
- Positions: Defender; midfielder

Youth career
- 1952: Inter de Lages

Senior career*
Years	Team	Apps	(Gls)
1953–1958	Inter de Lages		
1958–1960	Flamengo-RS		
1961–1971	Grêmio	344	(10)
1972	Inter de Lages		

International career
1966	Brazil	2	(0)

Managerial career
- 1974: Caxias
- 1975: Inter de Lages
- 1975–1976: Avaí
- 1976–1977: Figueirense
- 1977: Carlos Renaux
- 1978: Chapecoense
- 1978: Avaí
- 1980: Avaí
- 1981: Avaí
- 1987: Avaí
- 1988: Chapecoense
- 1989: Araranguá
- 1989: Esportivo
- 1990: Araranguá
- 1990: Marcílio Dias
- 1995: Santa Cruz-RS
- 1995: Tubarão
- * Club domestic league appearances and goals as of 22 May 2024

Áureo Agostinho Arruda Malinverni (26 December 1933 – 17 May 2023), simply known as Áureo, was a Brazilian professional footballer and manager, who played as a defender and midfielder.

== Career ==
Born in Lages, Santa Catarina, Áureo began his career at EC Internacional in his hometown. He also played for Flamengo de Caxias do Sul (currently SER Caxias) and for Grêmio FBPA, where he made 344 appearances and was part of most of the club's achievements in the 1960s. In 2003 he was included in the Grêmio FBPA hall of fame.

Áureo also played for the Brazil national team in two matches, against Chile, valid for the 1966 Copa Bernardo O'Higgins.

== Managerial career ==
Áureo managed several clubs, especially in the south region of Brazil. He was champion in 1975 with Avaí FC, being the coach with the most total appearances for the club, with 252 in total.

== Honours ==
=== Player ===
Grêmio

- Campeonato Gaúcho: 1963, 1964, 1965, 1966, 1967, 1968
- Campeonato Citadino de Porto Alegre: 1964, 1965

Brazil

- Copa Bernardo O'Higgins: 1966

=== Manager ===
Avaí

- Campeonato Catarinense: 1975

== Death ==
Áureo died on 17 May 2023, at the age of 89, in the city of Florianópolis.
