= Marco Aurélio (footballer, born 1970) =

Brazilian footballer

Personal information
- Full name: Marco Aurélio Siqueira
- Date of birth: 4 June 1970 (age 56)
- Place of birth: Ribeirão Preto, Brazil
- Height: 1.88 m (6 ft 2 in)
- Position: Goalkeeper

Senior career*
Years	Team	Apps	(Gls)
1989–1994	Náutico	35	(0)
1995–1996	Santa Cruz		
1996	Rio Ave	14	(0)
1997–1998	Farense	50	(0)
1998–2007	Belenenses	258	(0)
Total		357	(0)
- * Club domestic league appearances and goals

Marco Aurélio Siqueira (born 4 June 1970), known as Marco Aurélio, is a Brazilian retired footballer who played as a goalkeeper.

Most of his career was spent in Portugal, where he appeared in more than 300 official games in 11 seasons (ten in the top division) in representation of three clubs, notably Belenenses.

== Football career ==
Marco Aurélio was born in Ribeirão Preto, São Paulo. He started his career with lowly Clube Náutico Capibaribe and Santa Cruz Futebol Clube, moving in 1996 to Portugal with Rio Ave FC.

After only four months Aurélio joined fellow first division side S.C. Farense, signing with Lisbon's C.F. Os Belenenses after one 1/2 seasons, helping it return to the top flight in his first year and going on to amass more than 300 official appearances. In the 2002–03 campaign his solid performances earned the club a comfortable mid-table position, and he was also named the Goalkeeper of the Year.

In six consecutive seasons, Aurélio only missed three league games for Belenenses combined. In 2007, however, after having lost his position to Paulo Costinha and often being as low as third-choice, he retired from professional football aged 37.
