= Aurelian of Limoges =

Saint Aurelian of Limoges

Bishop
- Died: 1st or 3rd century
- Venerated in: Roman Catholic Church
- Feast: 10 May
- Patronage: patron of the guild of butchers in Limoges

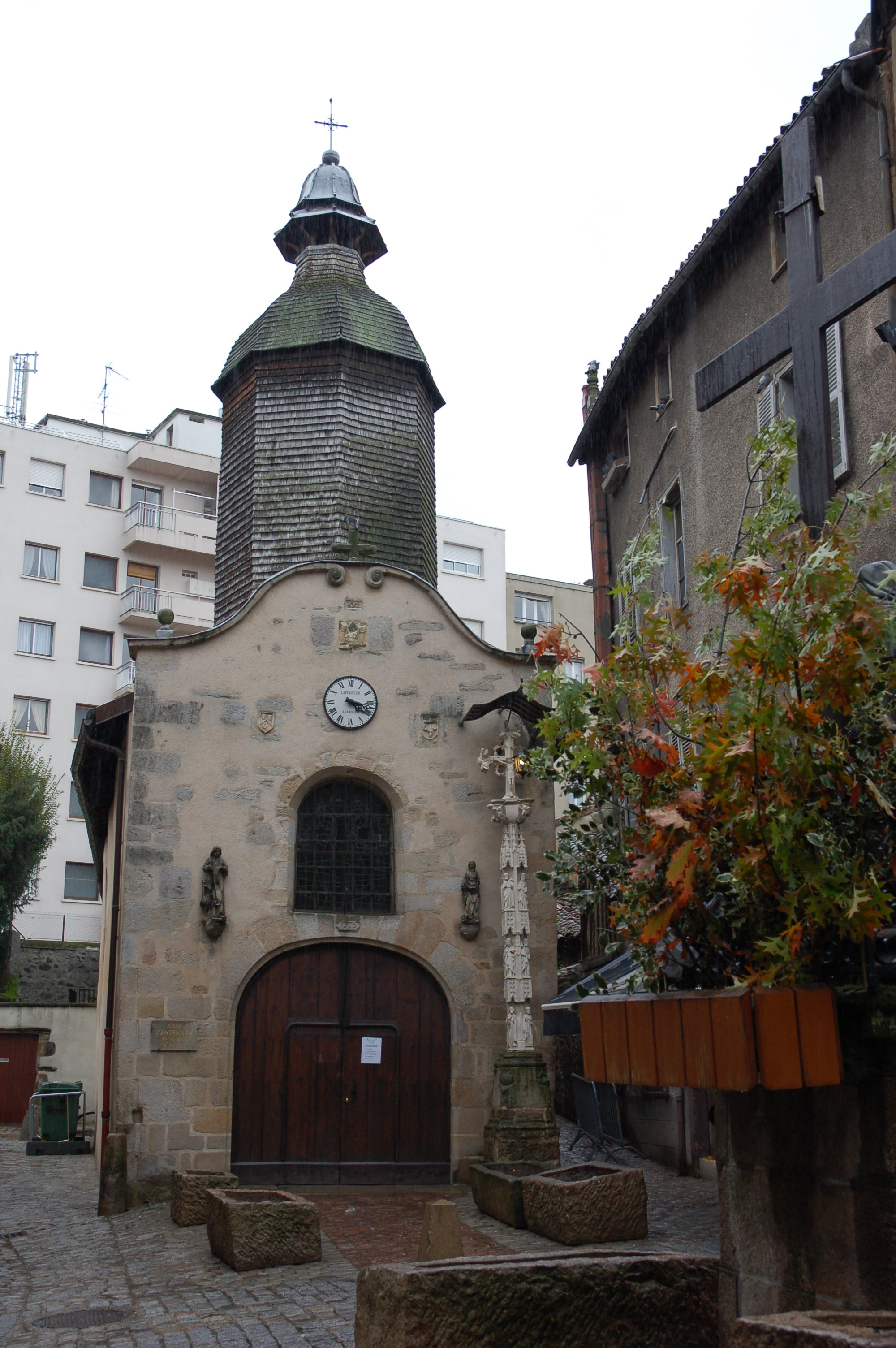
Chapelle Saint-Aurélien, Limoges

Saint Aurelian of Limoges (French: Saint Aurélien) is venerated as a Christian saint. Christian tradition makes him the second bishop of Limoges, and the successor of St. Martial.

According to tradition, Aurelian was originally a pagan priest who wanted to throw Martial into prison. However, Aurelian was struck dead as he attempted to do so. Martial brought him back to life, baptized him as a Christian, ordained him as a priest, and consecrated him as bishop.

A biography of Martial, the Vita Aureliana, is attributed to Aurelian. However, the work was written much later, perhaps by the chronicler Adhémar de Chabannes or earlier, around 955, before the birth of Adhémar. The work was designed to 'prove' that Martial had been present at the Last Supper and at the crucifixion, and was indeed one of the original apostles.

Aurelian’s relics are at the church known as the Chapelle Saint-Aurélien (built between the 14th-17th centuries), in Limoges. It is the property of the Confrérie Saint Aurélien, the successor organization to the ancient guild butchers of Limoges.
