= Marcos Aurellio =

Argentine footballer

Marcos Aurelio Di Paulo (27 September 1920 in Buenos Aires – 28 September 1996) was an Argentine-born former footballer. He played with FC Barcelona since 1948 until 1951 and scored the goal number 1000 for FC Barcelona in La Liga.

Before arriving in Spain he played for Chacarita Juniors, Vélez Sársfield and Club León.
