= Cantons of the Haute-Vienne department =

The following is a list of the 21 cantons of the Haute-Vienne department, in France, following the French canton reorganisation which came into effect in March 2015:

- Aixe-sur-Vienne
- Ambazac
- Bellac
- Châteauponsac
- Condat-sur-Vienne
- Couzeix
- Eymoutiers
- Limoges-1
- Limoges-2
- Limoges-3
- Limoges-4
- Limoges-5
- Limoges-6
- Limoges-7
- Limoges-8
- Limoges-9
- Panazol
- Rochechouart
- Saint-Junien
- Saint-Léonard-de-Noblat
- Saint-Yrieix-la-Perche
