= Isle, Haute-Vienne =

Isle
- Commune
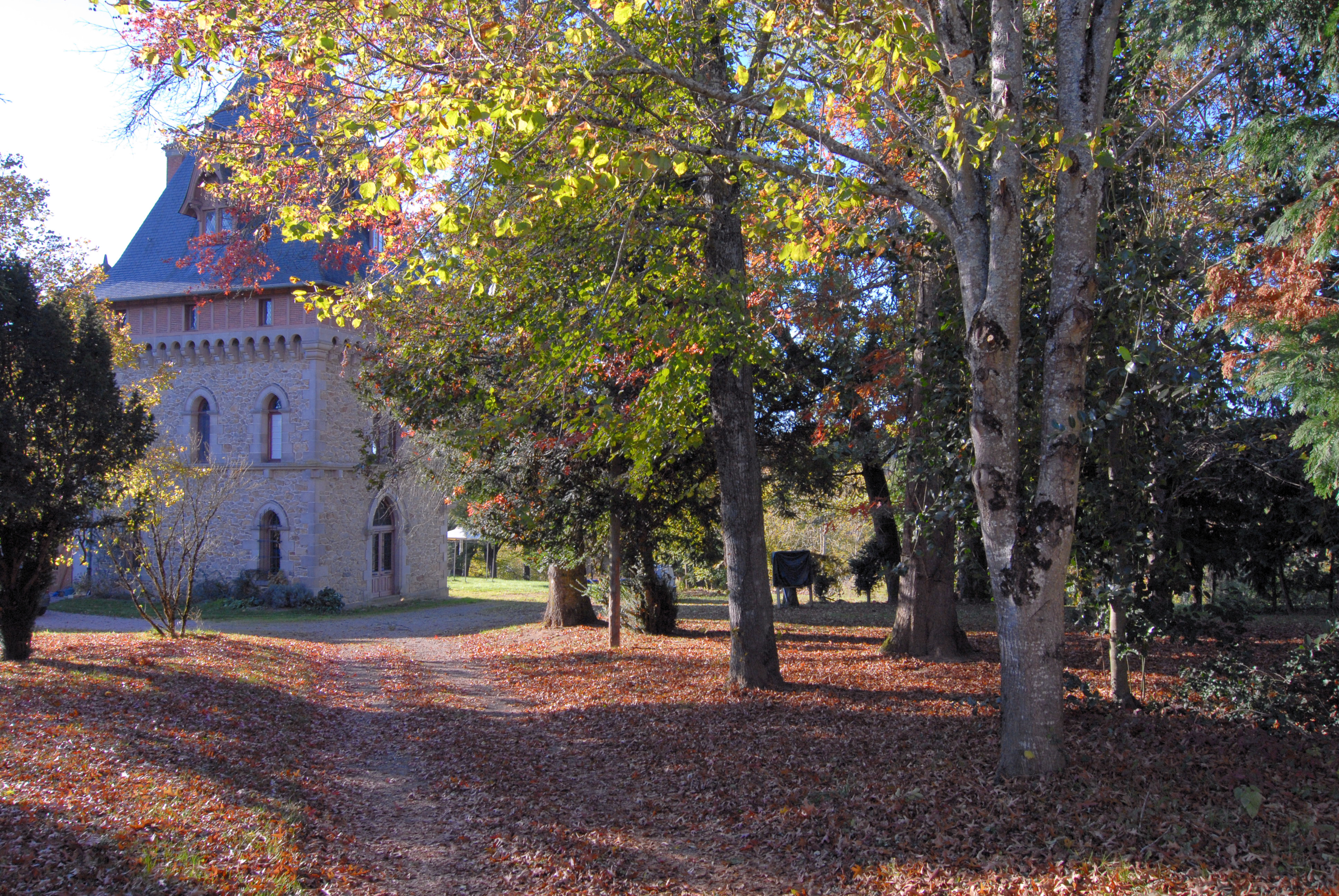
- Le château de Gigondas, in Isle

- Coat of arms
- Location of Isle
- Location within France Location within Nouvelle-Aquitaine
- Coordinates: 45°48′18″N 1°13′38″E
- Country: France
- Region: Nouvelle-Aquitaine
- Department: Haute-Vienne
- Arrondissement: Limoges
- Canton: Limoges-9
- Intercommunality: CU Limoges Métropole

Government
  - Mayor (2020–2026): Gilles Bégout
- Area^{1}: 20.18 km^{2} (7.79 sq mi)
- Highest elevation: 346 m (1,135 ft)
- Lowest elevation: 208 m (682 ft)
- Population (2023): 7,995
  - Density: 396.2/km^{2} (1,026/sq mi)
- Time zone: UTC+01:00 (CET)
  - Summer (DST): UTC+02:00 (CEST)
- INSEE/Postal code: 87075 /87170
- ^{1} French Land Register data, which excludes lakes, ponds, glaciers > 1 km^{2} (0.386 sq mi or 247 acres) and river estuaries.

Isle (French pronunciation: [il]; Occitan: Isla) is a commune in the Haute-Vienne department in the Nouvelle-Aquitaine region in west-central France.

As of 2023, Isle is the fifth commune of the department (by population), after Limoges, Saint-Junien, Panazol and Couzeix.

== Population ==
Inhabitants are known as Islois in French.

Historical population
Year	Pop.	±% p.a.
1968	4,732	—
1975	5,808	+2.97%
1982	6,863	+2.41%
1990	7,292	+0.76%
1999	7,691	+0.59%
2007	7,517	−0.29%
2012	7,515	−0.01%
2017	7,696	+0.48%
2023	7,995	+0.64%
Source: INSEE

== See also ==
- Communes of the Haute-Vienne department
