= Arrondissements of the Haute-Vienne department =

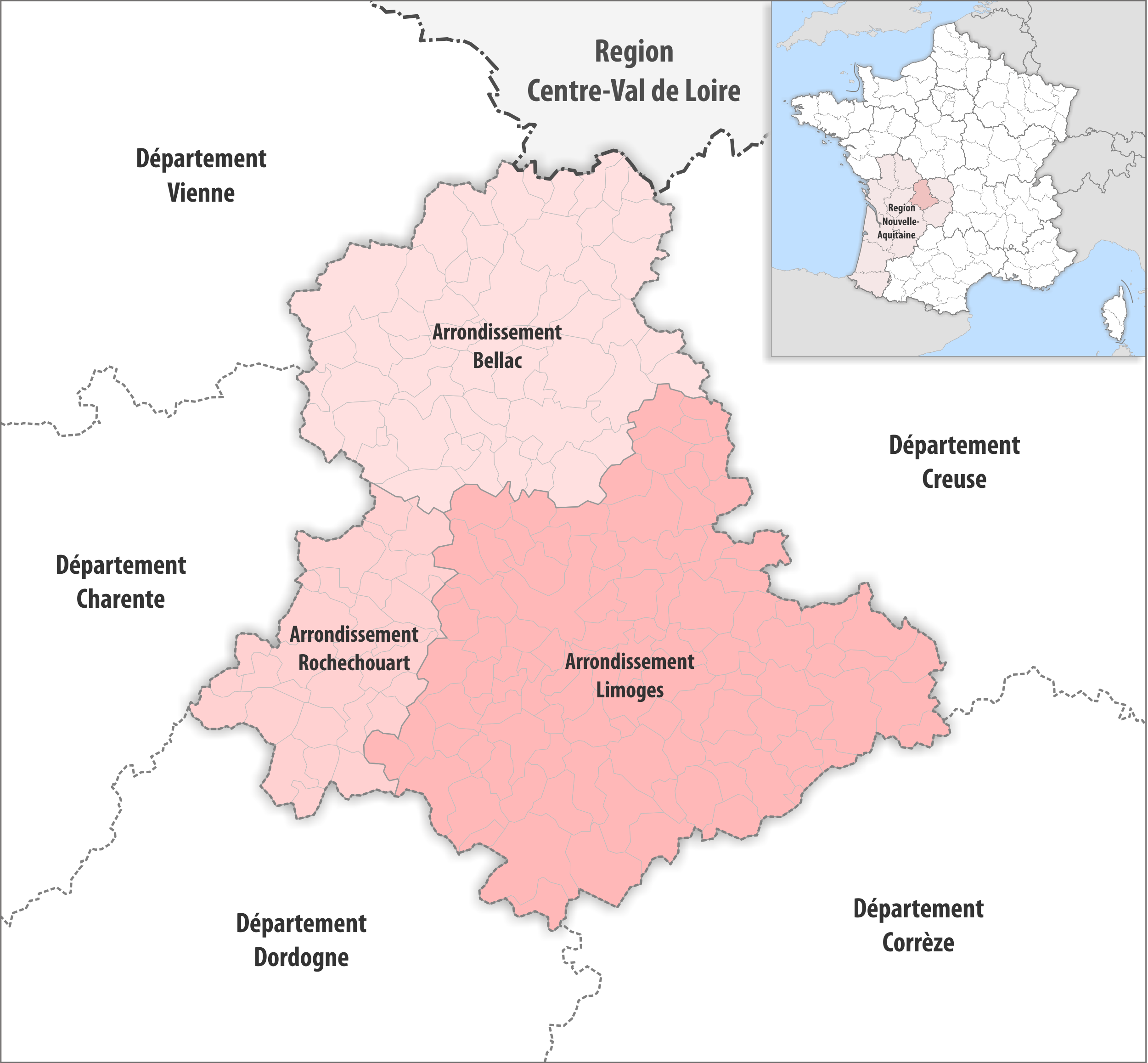
Map of arrondissements of the Haute-Vienne department.

The 3 arrondissements of the Haute-Vienne department are:

1. Arrondissement of Bellac, (subprefecture: Bellac) with 57 communes. The population of the arrondissement was 37,903 in 2021.
2. Arrondissement of Limoges, (prefecture of the Haute-Vienne department: Limoges) with 108 communes. The population of the arrondissement was 296,099 in 2021.
3. Arrondissement of Rochechouart, (subprefecture: Rochechouart) with 30 communes. The population of the arrondissement was 37,689 in 2021.

== History ==
In 1800 the arrondissements of Limoges, Bellac, Rochechouart and Saint-Yrieix were established. The arrondissement of Saint-Yrieix was disbanded in 1926.
