= Émile Labussière =

French politician

Mayor of Limoges
- In office 1889–1892

Personal details
- Born: 2 May 1853 Bénévent-l'Abbaye, France
- Died: 21 February 1924 (aged 70) Perpignan, France
- Occupation: Politician
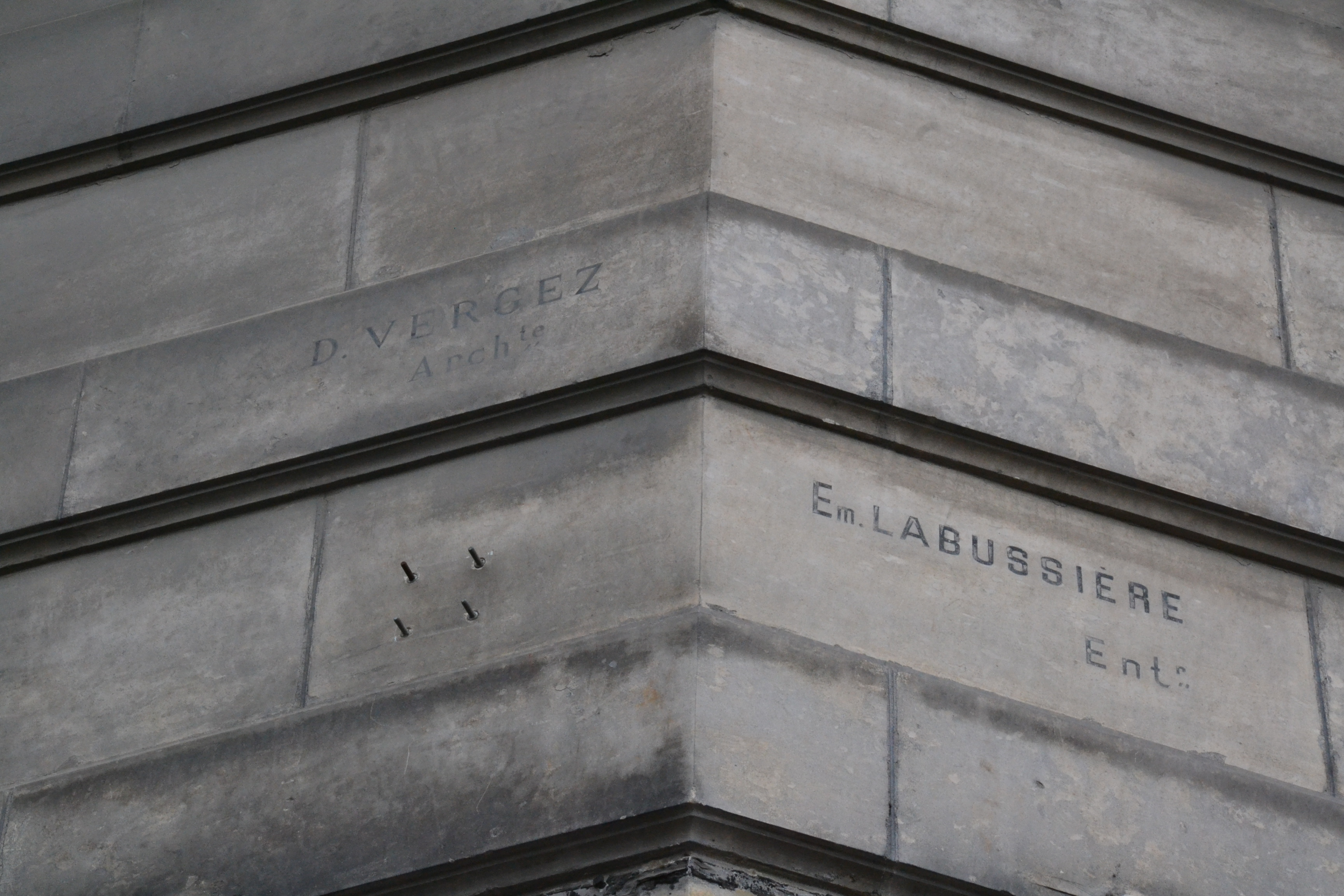
- Signature

Émile Labussière (2 May 1853 — 21 February 1924) was a French politician.

He was member of the Radical-socialiste Party and served as mayor of Limoges from 1889 to 1892. He was a deputy for Haute-Vienne in 1910. He was appointed treasurer-pay general in Reunion in 1906.

== Biography ==
Émile Labussièrew was born in Bénévent-l'Abbaye, France in 1853 and died in Perpignan, France in 1924 at the age of 70.

Political offices
Preceded by -	Mayor of Limoges; 1889 – 1892	Succeeded by -
