= Haute-Vienne's 3rd constituency =

Constituency of the National Assembly of France

3rd constituency of Haute-Vienne
- inline Constituency of the National Assembly of France

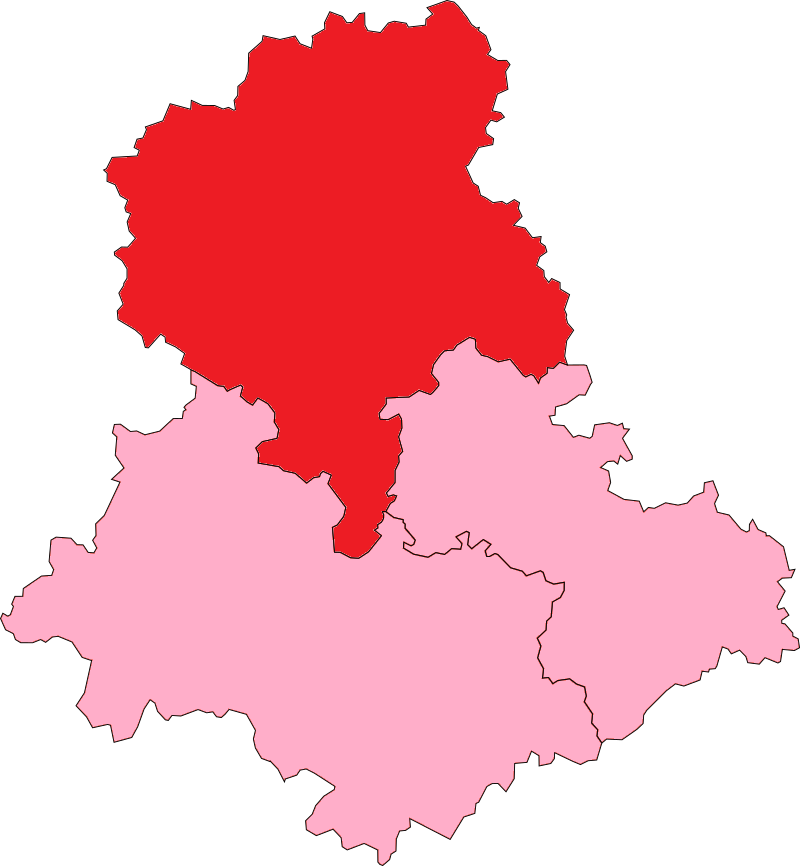
- Haute-Vienne's 3rd Constituency shown within Haute-Vienne
- Deputy: Manon Meunier; LFI
- Department: Haute-Vienne
- Cantons: Bellac, Bessines-sur-Gartempe, Châteauponsac, Laurière, Le Dorat, Limoges-Beaupuy, Limoges-Corgnac, Limoges-Couzeix, Limoges-Isle, Limoges-Landouge, Limoges-Puy-las-Rodas, Magnac-Laval, Mézières-sur-Issoire, Nantiat, Nieul, Saint-Sulpice-les-Feuilles
- Registered voters: 83058

The 3rd constituency of Haute-Vienne (French: Troisième circonscription de la Haute-Vienne) is a French legislative constituency in the Haute-Vienne département. Like the other 576 French constituencies, it elects one MP using a two round electoral system.

== Description ==
The 3rd Constituency of Haute-Vienne covers the northern part of the Department. In common with the other two constituencies of Haute-Vienne it includes some of the city of Limoges.

Similarly to Haute-Vienne's 2nd constituency this seat has traditionally supported candidates from the centre-left Socialist Party, the only exceptions in recent years being the 1993 and 2017 elections.

En Marche candidate Marie-Ange Magne was elected in 2017.

== Assembly Members ==
Election	Member	Party
1988	Marcel Mocoeur	PS
1993	Jacques-Michel Faure	RPR
1997	Marie-Françoise Pérol-Dumont	PS
2002	Marie-Françoise Pérol-Dumont	PS
2007	Marie-Françoise Pérol-Dumont	PS
2012	Catherine Beaubatie	PS
2017	Marie-Ange Magne	LREM
2022	Manon Meunier	LFI

== Election results ==
=== 2024 ===
Candidate	Party	Alliance	First round		Second round	
Candidate	Party	Alliance	Votes	%	Votes	%
Manon Meunier	LFI	NFP	19,494	35.18	23,095	40.76
Albin Freychet	RN		19,310	34.85	20,992	37.05
Gilles Toulza	DVC	Ensemble	14,768	26.65	12,573	22.19
Zohra Radjetti	DLF	DSV	1,044	1.88		
Daniel Mournetas	LO		797	1.44		
Valid votes			55,413	95.40	56,660	96.42
Blank votes			1,551	2.67	1,277	2.17
Null votes			1,122	1.93	826	1.41
Turnout			58,086	71.36	58,763	72.18
Abstentions			23,307	28.64	22,651	27.82
Registered voters			81,393		81,414	
Result			LFI HOLD			

=== 2022 ===
Legislative Election 2022: Haute-Vienne's 3rd constituency
Party	Candidate	Votes	%	±%
LFI (NUPÉS)	Manon Meunier	13,079	31.68	-0.84
LREM (Ensemble)	Geoffroy Sardin	8,384	20.31	-17.34
RN	Albin Freychet	8,117	19.66	+9.53
LR (UDC)	Gilles Toulza	4,177	10.12	−5.95
LREM	Vincent Leonie*	3,082	7.46	N/A
REC	Antoine Ardant	1,695	4.11	N/A
Others	N/A	2,753	6.67	
Turnout		41,287	52.57	−2.15
2nd round result
LFI (NUPÉS)	Manon Meunier	19,551	52.10	N/A
LREM (Ensemble)	Geoffroy Sardin	17,976	47.90	−14.88
Turnout		37,527	51.35	+10.37
LFI gain from LREM				

* LREM dissident

=== 2017 ===
Legislative Election 2017: Haute-Vienne's 3rd constituency
Party	Candidate	Votes	%	±%
LREM	Marie-Ange Magne	17,116	37.65	
LR	Guillaume Guérin	7,303	16.07	
LFI	Pierre-Edouard Pialat	6,250	13.75	
PS	Catherine Beaubatie	5,836	12.84	
FN	Vincent Gerard	4,604	10.13	
PCF	Isabelle Couturier	1,376	3.03	
EELV	Marcel Bayle	1,316	2.90	
Others	N/A	1,655		
Turnout		45,456	54.72	
2nd round result
LREM	Marie-Ange Magne	21,369	62.78	
LR	Guillaume Guérin	12,668	37.22	
Turnout		34,037	40.98	
LREM gain from PS				

=== 2012 ===
Legislative Election 2012: Haute-Vienne's 3rd constituency
Party	Candidate	Votes	%	±%
PS	Catherine Beaubatie	17,080	33.58	
PRV	Jean-Marc Gabouty	12,501	24.58	
DVD	Monique Boulestin	7,947	15.62	
FN	Catherine Laporte	6,079	11.95	
Far left	Daniel Clerembaux	4,237	8.33	
EELV	Ghislaine Jeannot-Pages	1,187	2.33	
Others	N/A	1,835		
Turnout		50,866	60.90	
2nd round result
PS	Catherine Beaubatie	27,540	58.12	
PRV	Jean-Marc Gabouty	19,842	41.88	
Turnout		47,382	56.73	
PS hold				

=== 2007 ===
Legislative Election 2007: Haute-Vienne's 3rd constituency
Party	Candidate	Votes	%	±%
PS	Marie-Françoise Pérol-Dumont	20,346	46.59	
UMP	Béatrice Martineau	13,529	30.98	
MoDem	Nadine Rivet	2,391	5.48	
Far left	Jean Pouyet	1,448	3.32	
PCF	Francis Dauliac	1,393	3.19	
FN	Nicole Daccord	1,181	2.70	
LV	Ghislaine Jeannot-Pages	1,118	2.56	
Others	N/A	2,265		
Turnout		44,679	67.43	
2nd round result
PS	Marie-Françoise Pérol-Dumont	26,631	62.33	
UMP	Béatrice Martineau	16,093	37.67	
Turnout		44,246	66.78	
PS hold				

=== 2002 ===
Legislative Election 2002: Haute-Vienne's 3rd constituency
Party	Candidate	Votes	%	±%
PS	Marie-Françoise Pérol-Dumont	18,933	41.92	
UMP	Beatrice Martineau	13,357	29.58	
FN	Jean-Baptiste Millon	2,905	6.43	
PCF	Jean-Pierre Normand	2,392	5.30	
UDF	Jean-Marie Thoury	2,337	5.17	
LCR	Marie-Agnes Clausse-Artaud	1,168	2.59	
CPNT	Raymond Desenfant	1,158	2.56	
LV	Michele Lage	1,032	2.29	
Others	N/A	1,881		
Turnout		46,638	70.20	
2nd round result
PS	Marie-Françoise Pérol-Dumont	24,616	57.78	
UMP	Beatrice Martineau	17,988	42.22	
Turnout		44,555	67.07	
PS hold				

=== 1997 ===
Legislative Election 1997: Haute-Vienne's 3rd constituency
Party	Candidate	Votes	%	±%
PS	Marie-Françoise Pérol-Dumont	14,684	33.18	
RPR	Jacques-Michel Faure	12,553	28.37	
PCF	Annie Barbier	6,859	15.50	
FN	Maxime Labesse	3,615	8.17	
LO	Daniel Mournetas	1,677	3.79	
DVG	Michel Kopciowski	1,421	3.21	
LV	Jean-Pol Voetzel	1,196	2.70	
DVD	Veronique Eoche-Duval	1,101	2.49	
Others	N/A	1,149		
Turnout		47,652	72.08	
2nd round result
PS	Marie-Françoise Pérol-Dumont	28,464	60.62	
RPR	Jacques-Michel Faure	18,489	39.38	
Turnout		50,431	76.29	
PS gain from RPR				
