= Beaublanc Stadium =

Stadium in Limoges, France

Coordinates: 45.8482°N 1.2413°E

- Stade de Beaublanc
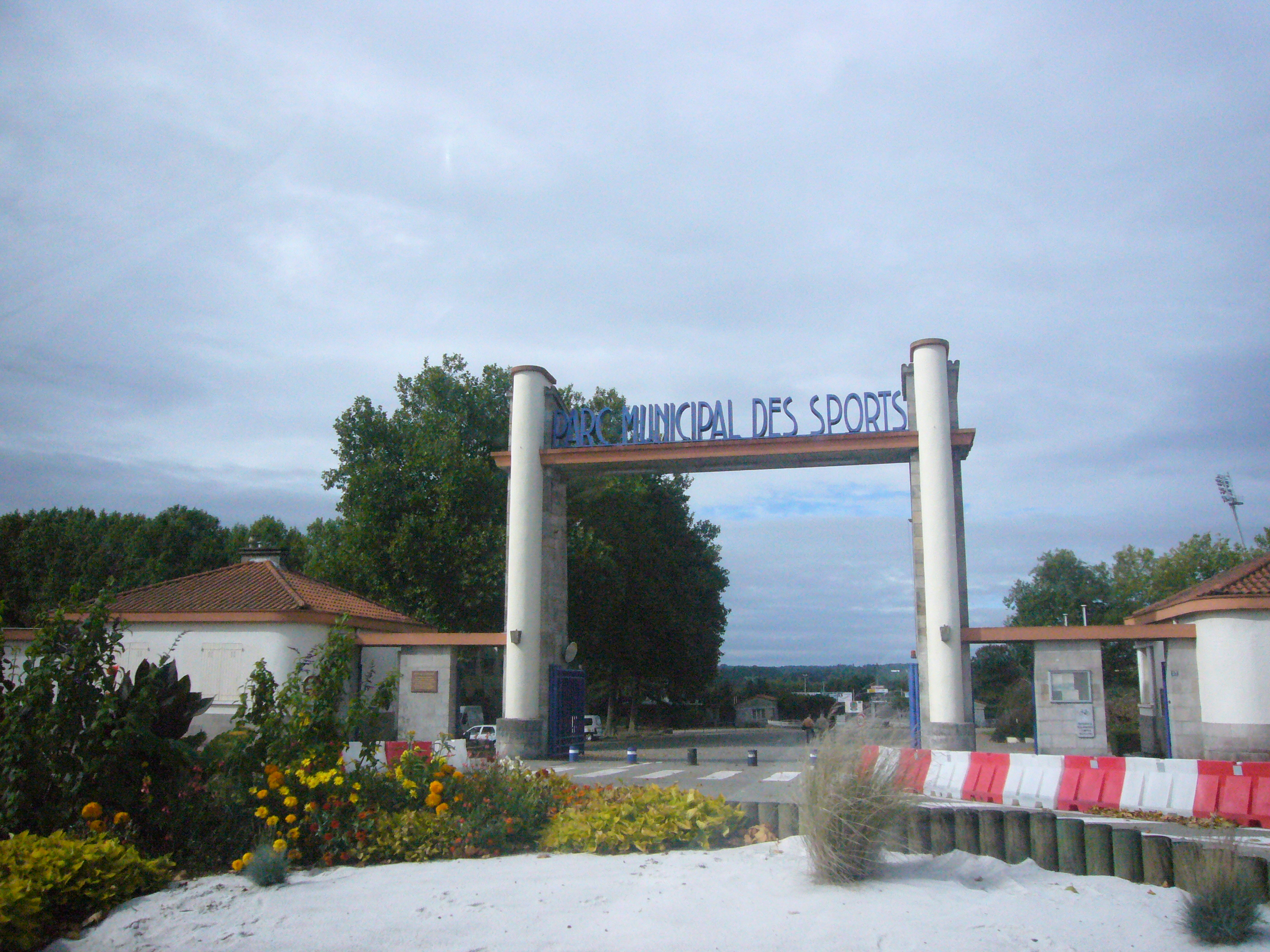
- Interactive map of Beaublanc Stadium
- Former names: Stade Jean Jaurès (1924-1947)
- Address: Limoges; France
- Capacity: 13,182

Construction
- Architect: André Pécaud

The Beaublanc Stadium (French: Stade de Beaublanc) is the main stadium in the French city of Limoges.

In 2018, the roof was almost complete, with 5,000 out of 10,000 seats already installed: the construction of the Beaublanc main stadium in Limoges neared completion.

At the project's launch, the entire stadium was supposed to cost 60 million euros. After six years of work, due to construction defects, the renovation bill for just half of the stadium reached 63 million euros.
