= Marie-Ange Magne =

French politician

Marie-Ange Magne (née Faintrenie; born 20 November 1987) is a French politician representing La République En Marche! who was elected Member of Parliament in the National Assembly on 18 June 2017, representing Haute-Vienne's 3rd constituency.

== Early life ==
She was born in Limoges.

== Political career ==
She stood down at the 2022 French legislative election, and was succeeded by Manon Meunier from La France Insoumise.

== See also ==
- 2017 French legislative election
