= Canton of Limoges-1 =

Coordinates: 45.83°N 1.23°E

The canton of Limoges-1 is an administrative division of the Haute-Vienne department, western France. It was created at the French canton reorganisation which came into effect in March 2015. Its seat is in Limoges.

It consists of the following communes:

1. Limoges (partly)
