= Panazol =

Panazol Panasòu (Occitan)
- Commune
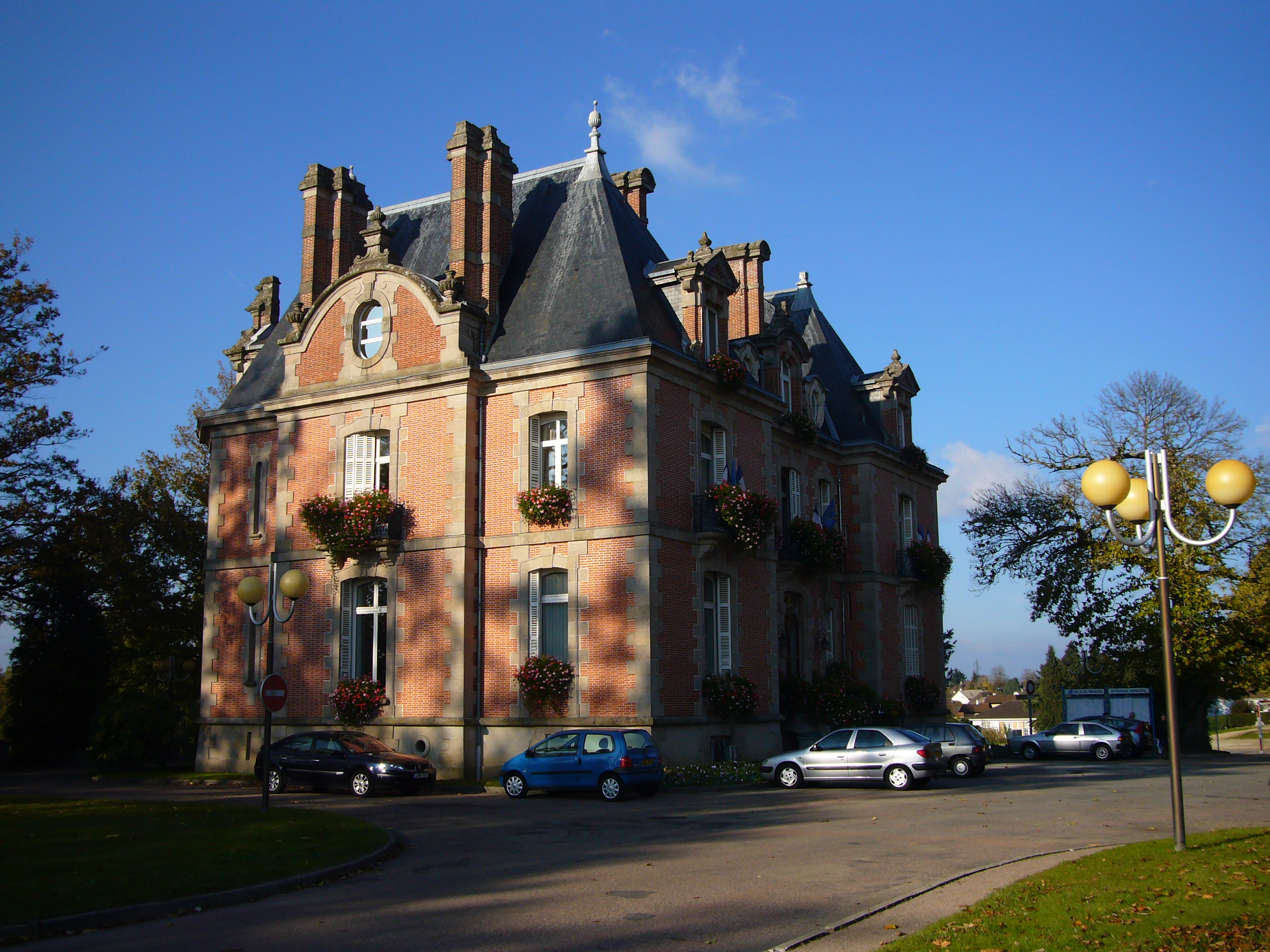
- Château de la Beausserie - The Town Hall

- Coat of arms
- Location of Panazol
- Location within France Location within Nouvelle-Aquitaine
- Coordinates: 45°50′23″N 1°18′39″E
- Country: France
- Region: Nouvelle-Aquitaine
- Department: Haute-Vienne
- Arrondissement: Limoges
- Canton: Panazol
- Intercommunality: CU Limoges Métropole

Government
  - Mayor (2020–2026): Fabien Doucet
- Area^{1}: 20.05 km^{2} (7.74 sq mi)
- Highest elevation: 351 m (1,152 ft)
- Lowest elevation: 215 m (705 ft)
- Population (2023): 11,342
  - Density: 565.7/km^{2} (1,465/sq mi)
- Time zone: UTC+01:00 (CET)
  - Summer (DST): UTC+02:00 (CEST)
- INSEE/Postal code: 87114 /87350
- ^{1} French Land Register data, which excludes lakes, ponds, glaciers > 1 km^{2} (0.386 sq mi or 247 acres) and river estuaries.

Panazol (French pronunciation: [panazɔl]; Occitan: Panasòu) is a commune in the Haute-Vienne department in the Nouvelle-Aquitaine region in west-central France. It is an eastern suburb of Limoges.

Panazol is the third largest town in the department (by population), after Limoges and Saint-Junien. It can be considered as a commuter town.

Théo Sarapo, the singer, actor, and second husband of Édith Piaf died at Limoges on 28 August 1970 on RD 941 at the Panazol exit, direction Saint-Léonard-de-Noblat (Haute-Vienne). His car, a blue Citroen ID19, left the road at high speed and struck a tree the approximate height of Chateau de la Rue. He was removed from the wreckage and rushed to the Limoges hospital, where he died as a result of his injuries at the age of 34. He was buried in Paris at Père-Lachaise cemetery alongside Édith Piaf.

== Population ==
Inhabitants are known as Panazolais.

Historical population
Year	Pop.	±% p.a.
1968	3,309	—
1975	5,261	+6.85%
1982	7,269	+4.73%
1990	8,553	+2.05%
1999	9,731	+1.44%
2007	10,076	+0.44%
2012	10,413	+0.66%
2017	10,972	+1.05%
2023	11,342	+0.55%
Source: INSEE

== See also ==
- Communes of the Haute-Vienne department
