= Canton of Limoges-8 =

Coordinates: 45.82°N 1.25°E

The canton of Limoges-8 is an administrative division of the Haute-Vienne department, western France. It was created at the French canton reorganisation which came into effect in March 2015. Its seat is in Limoges.

It consists of the following communes:

1. Limoges (partly)
