= Canton of Panazol =

Coordinates: 45.84°N 1.31°E

The canton of Panazol is an administrative division of the Haute-Vienne department, western France. It was created at the French canton reorganisation which came into effect in March 2015. Its seat is in Panazol.

It consists of the following communes:

1. Feytiat
2. Panazol
