= Marcel Vardelle =

French politician

Marcel Vardelle (16 April 1883 – 2 October 1969) was a French politician.

Vardelle was born in Limoges. He represented the French Section of the Workers' International (SFIO) in the Chamber of Deputies from 1932 to 1940. On 10 July 1940 he voted in favour of granting the Cabinet presided over by Marshal Philippe Pétain authority to draw up a new constitution, thereby effectively ending the French Third Republic and establishing Vichy France. He was expelled from the SFIO after the Liberation of France because of this vote.

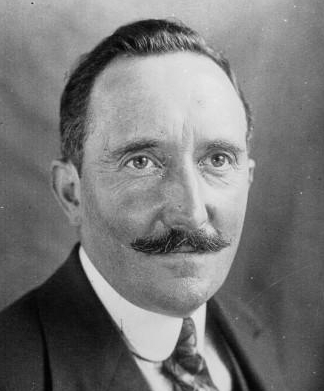
Marcel Vardelle, was a French politician.
