= Canton of Limoges-4 =

Coordinates: 45.87°N 1.27°E

The canton of Limoges-4 is an administrative division of the Haute-Vienne department, western France. It was created at the French canton reorganisation which came into effect in March 2015. Its seat is in Limoges.

It consists of the following communes:

1. Limoges (partly)
