= Feytiat =

- Commune
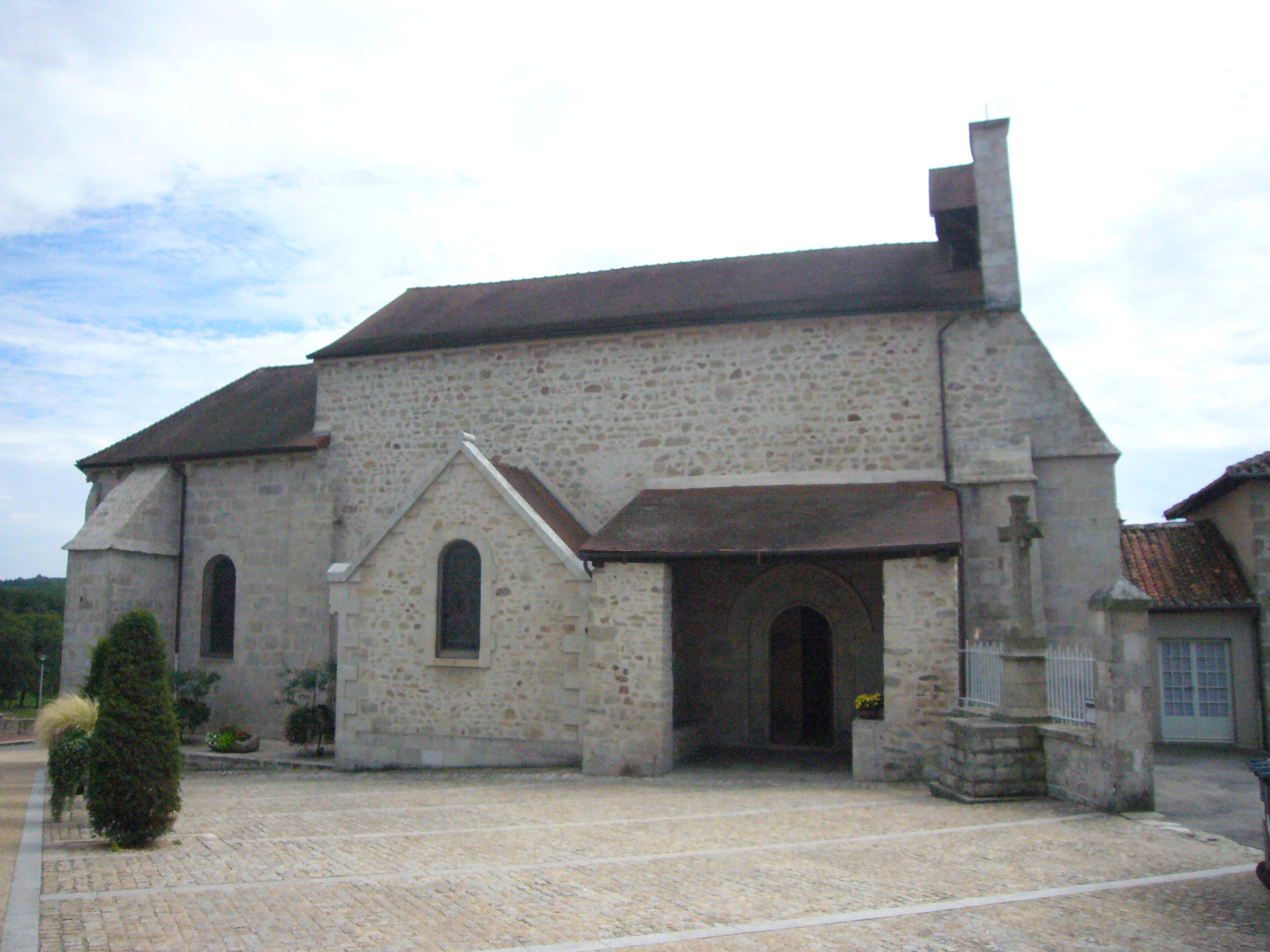
- The church in Feytiat

- Coat of arms
- Location of Feytiat
- Location within France Location within Nouvelle-Aquitaine
- Coordinates: 45°48′37″N 1°19′57″E
- Country: France
- Region: Nouvelle-Aquitaine
- Department: Haute-Vienne
- Arrondissement: Limoges
- Canton: Panazol
- Intercommunality: CU Limoges Métropole

Government
  - Mayor (2025–2026): Laurent Lafaye
- Area^{1}: 25.32 km^{2} (9.78 sq mi)
- Highest elevation: 393 m (1,289 ft)
- Lowest elevation: 254 m (833 ft)
- Population (2023): 6,176
  - Density: 243.9/km^{2} (631.7/sq mi)
- Time zone: UTC+01:00 (CET)
  - Summer (DST): UTC+02:00 (CEST)
- INSEE/Postal code: 87065 /87220
- ^{1} French Land Register data, which excludes lakes, ponds, glaciers > 1 km^{2} (0.386 sq mi or 247 acres) and river estuaries.

Feytiat (French pronunciation: [fetja]; Occitan: Festiac) is a commune in the Haute-Vienne department in the Nouvelle-Aquitaine region in west-central France.

== Population ==
Inhabitants are known as Feytiacois in French.

Historical population
Year	Pop.	±% p.a.
1968	1,566	—
1975	2,941	+9.42%
1982	3,573	+2.82%
1990	4,408	+2.66%
1999	5,273	+2.01%
2007	5,655	+0.88%
2012	6,125	+1.61%
2017	6,123	−0.01%
2023	6,176	+0.14%
Source: INSEE

== See also ==
- Communes of the Haute-Vienne department
