= Manon Meunier =

French politician (born 1996)

Member of the National Assembly for Haute-Vienne's 3rd constituency
- Incumbent
- Assumed office 22 June 2022
- Preceded by: Marie-Ange Magne

Personal details
- Born: 30 March 1996 (age 30) Limoges, Haute-Vienne, France
- Party: La France Insoumise
- Occupation: politician

Manon Meunier (born 30 March 1996) is a French politician from La France Insoumise. She was elected as a deputy for Haute-Vienne's 3rd constituency in the 2022 French legislative election.

== See also ==
- List of deputies of the 16th National Assembly of France
