= Limoges Box =

Hinged porcelain trinket box

The Limoges Box is type of small hinged porcelain trinket box produced by Limoges porcelain factories near the city of Limoges, France. They are made of hard-paste porcelain and collected worldwide.

Limoges porcelain boxes were first created in the mid-18th century after Jacques Turgot, Finance Minister of King Louis XVI, gave a Royal edict to the city of Limoges, France the exclusive right to produce Royal Limoges porcelain for the Kingdom of France. The first Limoges trinket boxes were long narrow containers that were created for expensive needles. From here, other shapes of limoges porcelain boxes evolved. The earliest were those that held thimbles and embroidery scissors and then round flat Limoges boxes were formed and used as powder boxes, and/or snuff boxes. Under Louis XIV these small boxes were used to hold a lock of lady's hair or small poem.

Exactly when and who made the first porcelain snuffbox is up for debate. There were faience snuffboxes that were produced sometime around 1730. These cannot be identified by back stamp marks, for none were put on them. There were four big porcelain factories that made snuff boxes around this time, Chantilly porcelain (1725–1800), Saint-Cloud porcelain (1677–1766), Mennecy porcelain (1734–73), and the royal Vincennes porcelain (1740–56), which moved to become Sèvres porcelain (1756–present). Additionally independent makers produced them with no signature or marking.

Snuff eventually went out of fashion around the time of the French Revolution but putting pills in Limoges boxes became popular. During the Victorian era the Limoges boxes lost popularity again until the 1970s when people began to carry their pills in the Limoges porcelain boxes. In the 20th century they became popularly used as pillboxes.

The creation of the Limoges Porcelain box is an arduous and time intensive process of creating a master mold, detail painting by hand of color and design, performing multiple firings and glazing upon the porcelain mold, and a final touch of a metal hinge for opening and closing. The painting of the Limoges porcelain in the Limoges box industry are accomplished by small handed French artisans, as experts at the fine brush strokes required for such detailed work. After painting, there are multiple firings. The final firing at a temperature of 1400C is unique to Limoges, giving them a very fine pure and strong white finish. The final touch to a Limoges box is the metal hinged mountings that are meticulously fitted to the finished box. The entire work process is made by hand, so small variations are the norm, thus making each piece really unique. Each model is often made in very limited numbers, & signed by the artists or the atelier.

Limoges boxes once were often gold boxes that contained portraits of king and other political figures. Napoleon I was one of the great snuffbox collectors, he had about 100 gold portrait boxes made as tokens of appreciation from his political supporters.
