= Limoges =

Limoges Limòtges (Occitan)
- Prefecture and commune
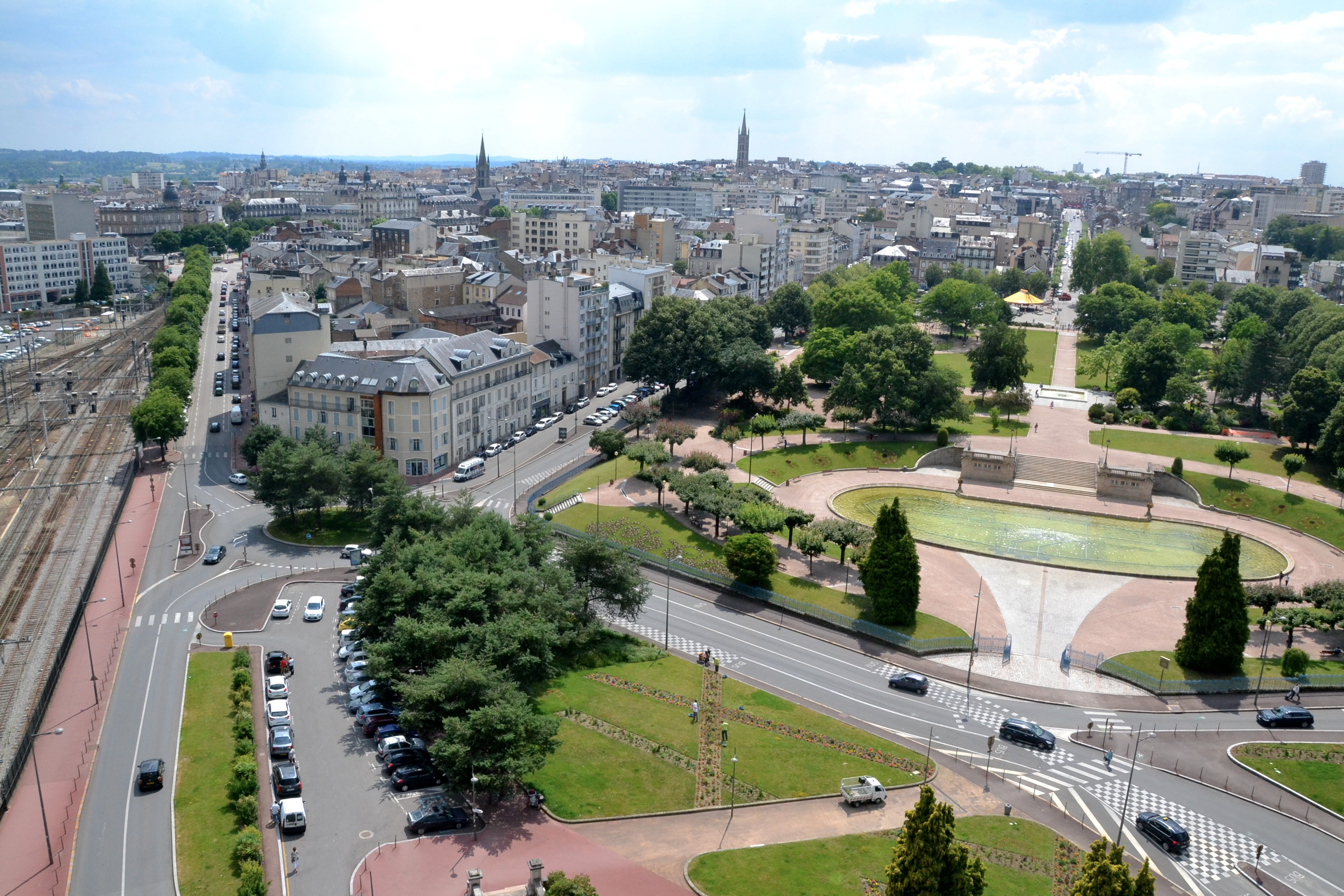
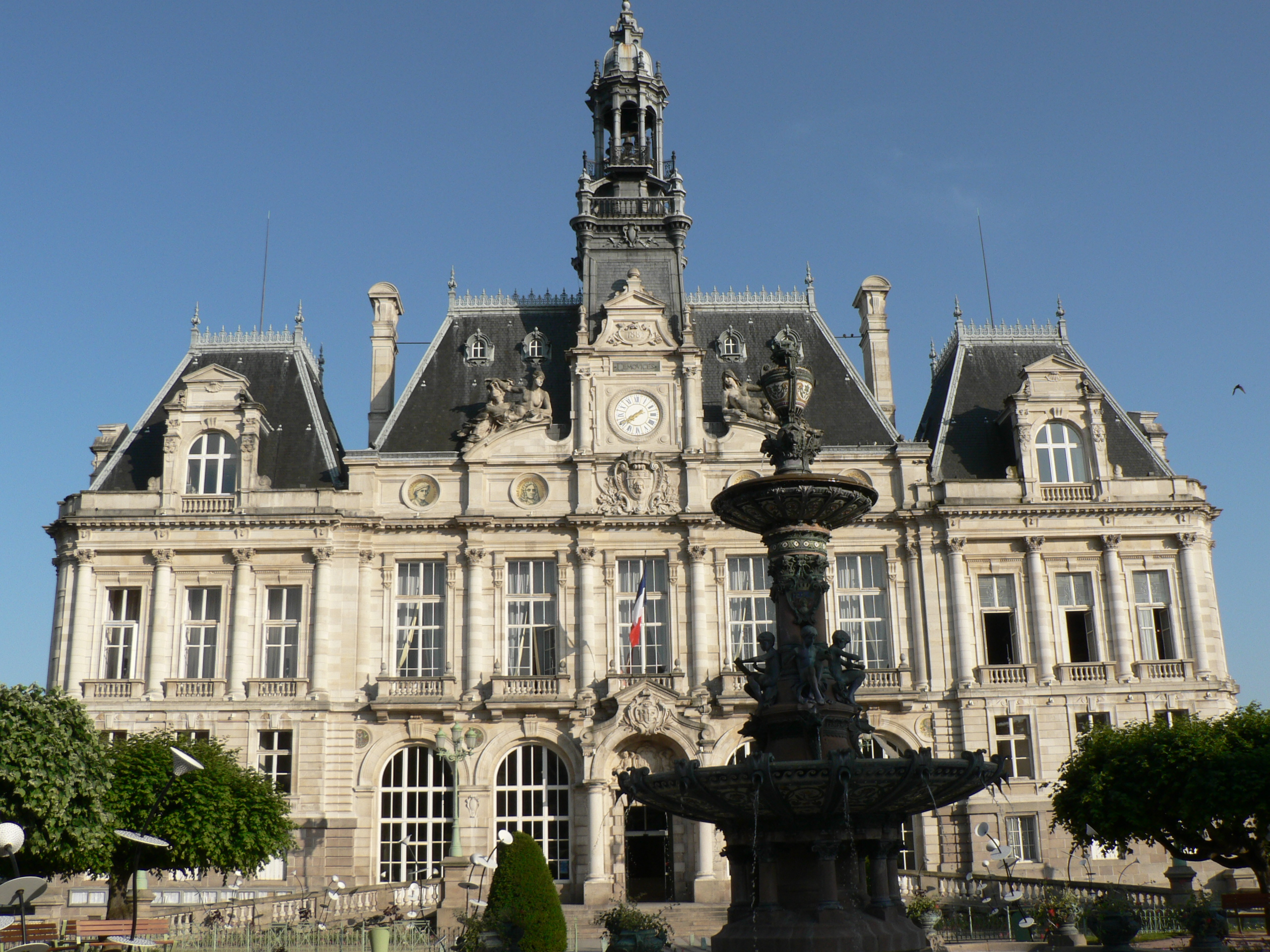
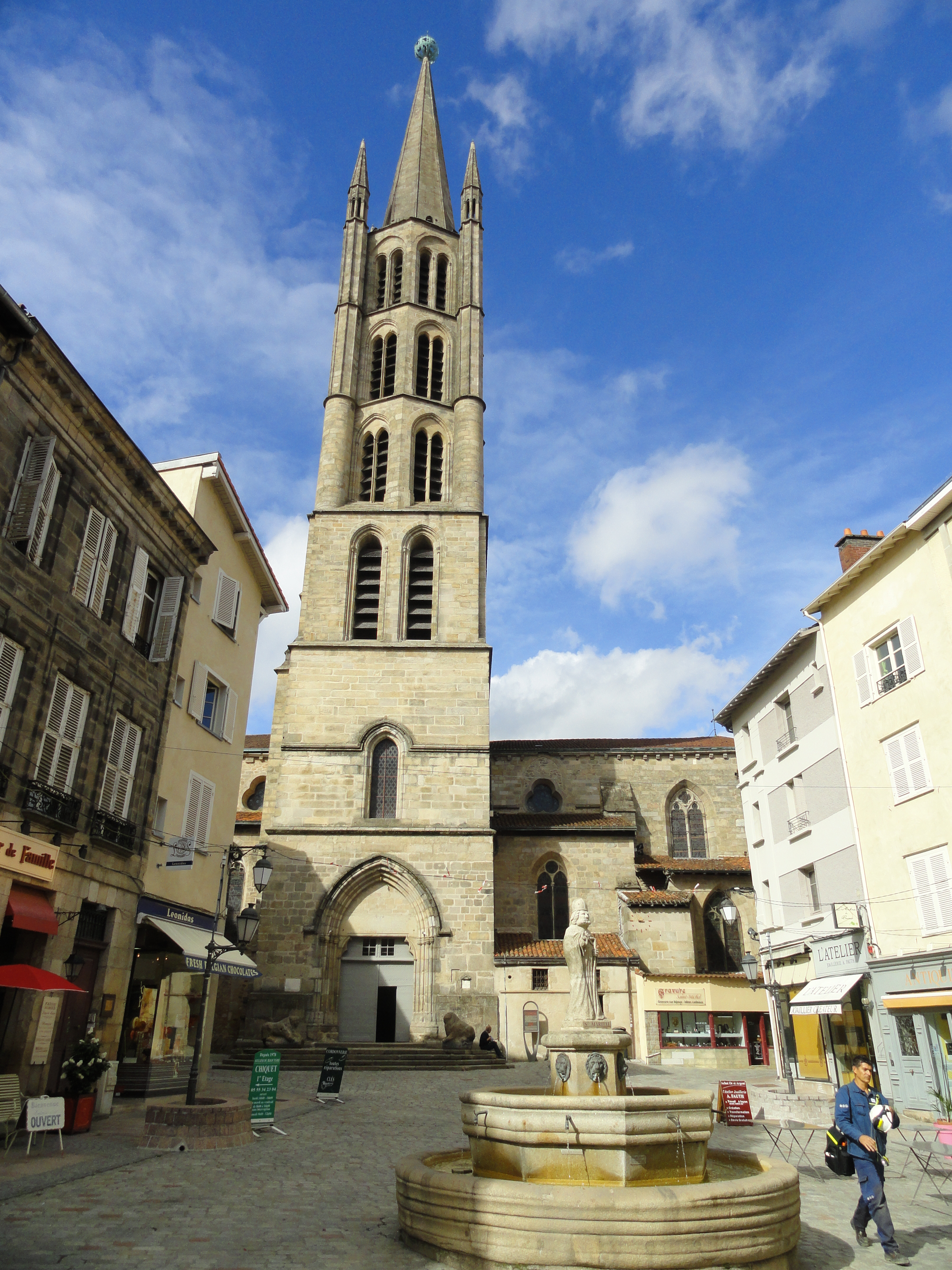
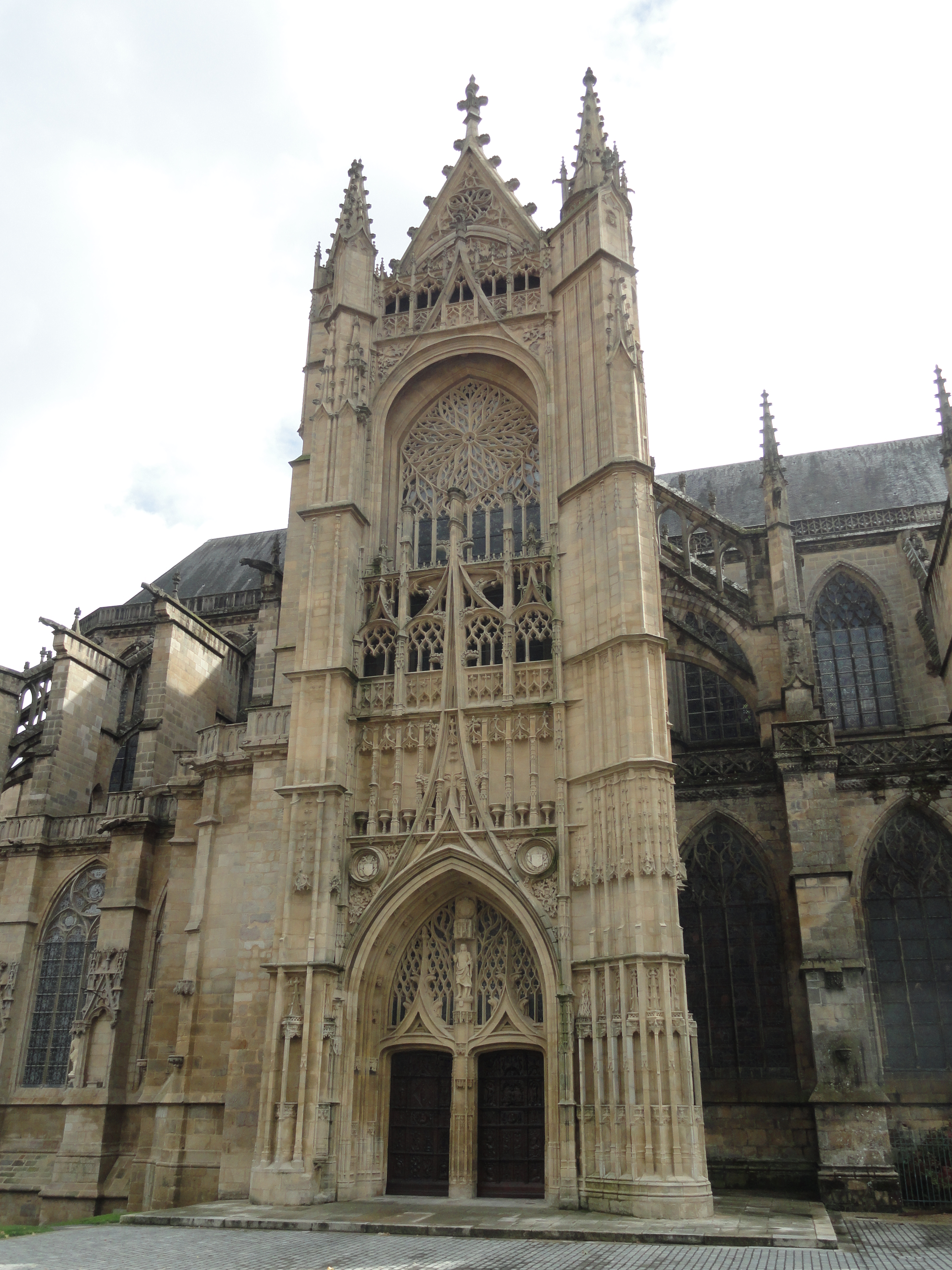
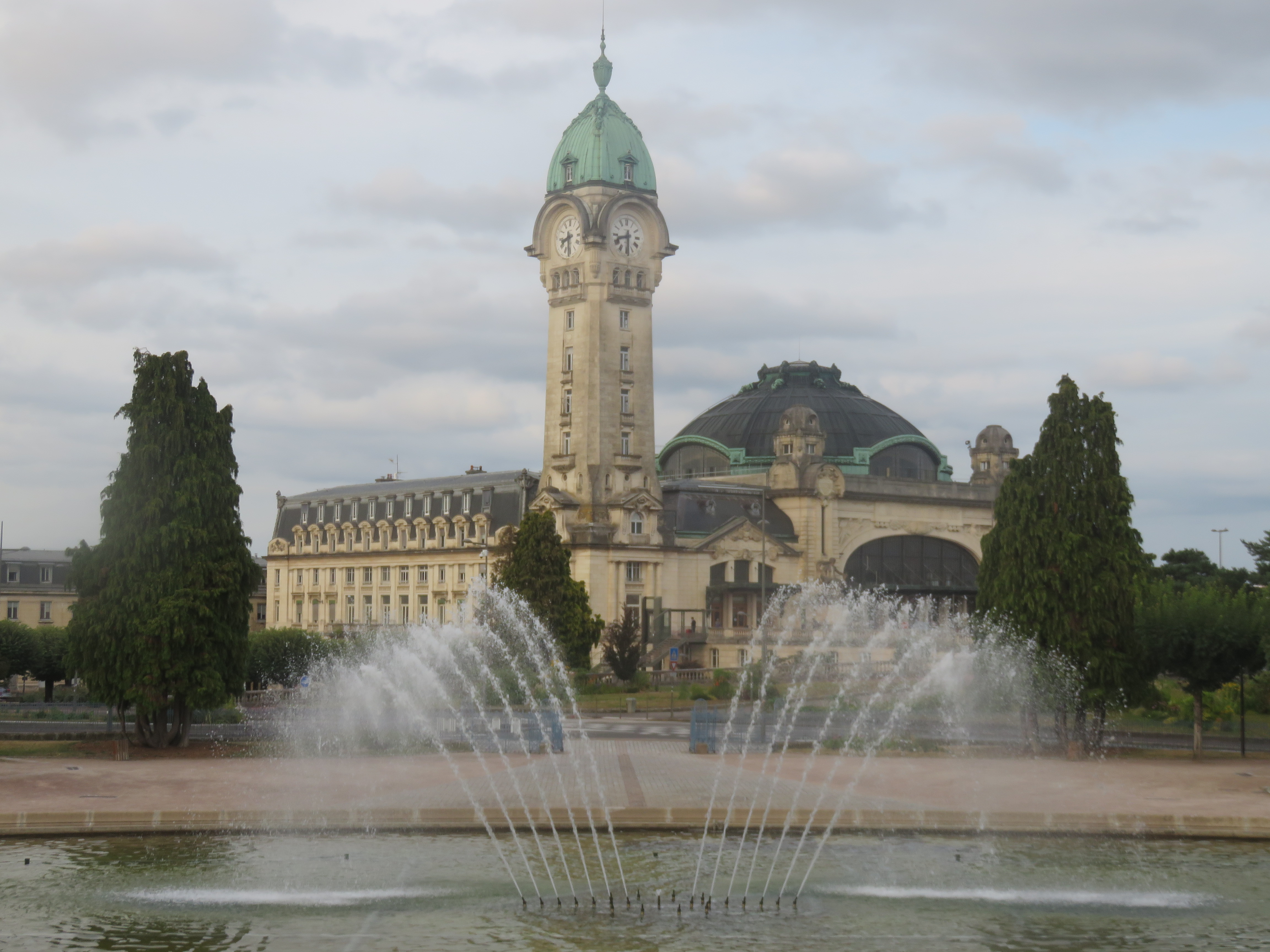
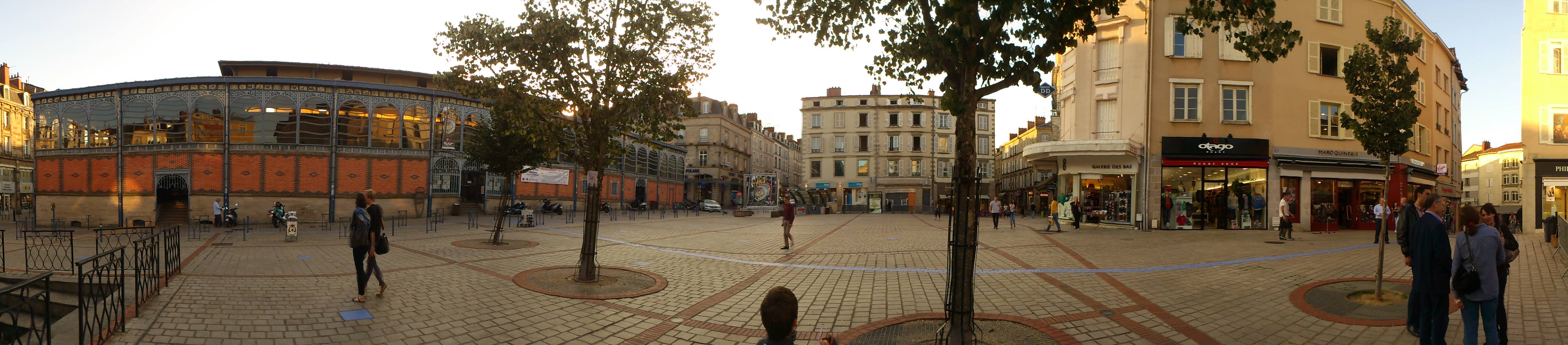
- Central Limoges and the Champ de Juillet Hôtel de Ville, before 2026 arson Church of St. Michel des Lions Limoges Cathedral Limoges-Bénédictins station Halls of Limoges

- Coat of arms
- Location of Limoges
- Location within France Location within Nouvelle-Aquitaine
- Coordinates: 45°50′07″N 1°15′45″E
- Country: France
- Region: Nouvelle-Aquitaine
- Department: Haute-Vienne
- Arrondissement: Limoges
- Canton: Limoges-1, 2, 3, 4, 5, 6, 7, 8 and 9
- Intercommunality: CU Limoges Métropole

Government
  - Mayor (2026–32): Guillaume Guérin
- Area^{1}: 77.45 km^{2} (29.90 sq mi)
  - Urban: 270.9 km^{2} (104.6 sq mi)
  - Metro: 3,407 km^{2} (1,315 sq mi)
- Elevation: 294 m (965 ft)
- Highest elevation: 431 m (1,414 ft)
- Lowest elevation: 209 m (686 ft)
- Population (2023): 129,937
  - Density: 1,678/km^{2} (4,345/sq mi)
  - Urban (2022): 186,163
  - Urban density: 687.2/km^{2} (1,780/sq mi)
  - Metro (2022): 323,494
  - Metro density: 94.95/km^{2} (245.9/sq mi)
- Demonym: Limougeauds
- Time zone: UTC+01:00 (CET)
  - Summer (DST): UTC+02:00 (CEST)
- INSEE/Postal code: 87085 /87000
- Website: limoges.fr
- ^{1} French Land Register data, which excludes lakes, ponds, glaciers > 1 km^{2} (0.386 sq mi or 247 acres) and river estuaries.

Limoges (/lɪˈmoʊʒ/ lih-MOHZH, US also /liːˈ-/ lee-; French: [limɔʒ]; Occitan: Lemòtges, locally Limòtges [liˈmɔdzei̯]) is a city and commune, and the prefecture of the Haute-Vienne department in west-central France. It was the administrative capital of the former Limousin region. Situated on the first western foothills of the Massif Central, Limoges is crossed by the river Vienne, of which it was originally the first ford crossing point.

The second most populated town in the Nouvelle-Aquitaine region after Bordeaux, a university town, an administrative centre and intermediate services with all the facilities of a regional metropolis, it has an urban area of 323,494 inhabitants in 2022. The inhabitants of the city are called the Limougeauds.

Founded around 10 BC under the name of Augustoritum, it became an important Gallo-Roman city. During the Middle Ages Limoges became a large city, strongly marked by the cultural influence of the Abbey of Saint-Martial, where the Dukes of Aquitaine were invested and crowned. From the 12th century onwards, its enamels were exported throughout the Christian world. In 1765, during the industrial revolution, the discovery of a deposit of kaolin in the Saint-Yrieix-la-Perche region enabled the development of the Limoges porcelain industry. It is sometimes nicknamed "the red city" or "the Rome of socialism" because of its tradition of voting on the left and the workers' events it experienced from the 19th to the beginning of the 20th century.

Since the 1990s, the city has had a basketball club, Limoges CSP, which has won several French championships and the European championship in 1993. Because of its heritage policy, it has held the label "City of Art and History" since 2008. Economic activities include butchering, electrical equipment for the building industry, and luxury goods. It is home to porcelain houses and art workshops working with enamel or stained glass. This craft expertise led it to join the UNESCO Creative Cities Network in 2017 in the thematic category "Crafts and Popular Arts".

== History ==
=== Ancient and medieval history ===
Scarce remains of pre-urban settlements have been found in the area of Limoges. The capital of the Gaulish people of the Lemovices, who lived in the area, was probably either near Villejoubert, some kilometres southeast of Saint-Léonard-de-Noblat, or Saint-Gence, northwest of Limoges.

The city proper was founded as Augustoritum by the Romans, around 10 BC: "rito-" is Gaulish for "ford". The foundation was part of the reorganization of the province by the emperor Augustus, hence the new name. The Roman city included an amphitheatre measuring 136 x 115 metres, a theatre, a forum, baths and several sanctuaries. According to tradition, a temple consecrated to Venus, Diana, Minerva and Jupiter was located near the modern cathedral. The city was on the typical Roman square plan, with two main streets crossing in the centre. It had a Senate and a currency of its own, a sign of its importance in the imperial age. Later, like many towns and cities in Gaul, it was renamed after the tribe (here the Lemovices) whose chief town it was; "Lemovices" subsequently evolved into "Limoges", and "Lemovicinus" for the area around changed into "Limousin".

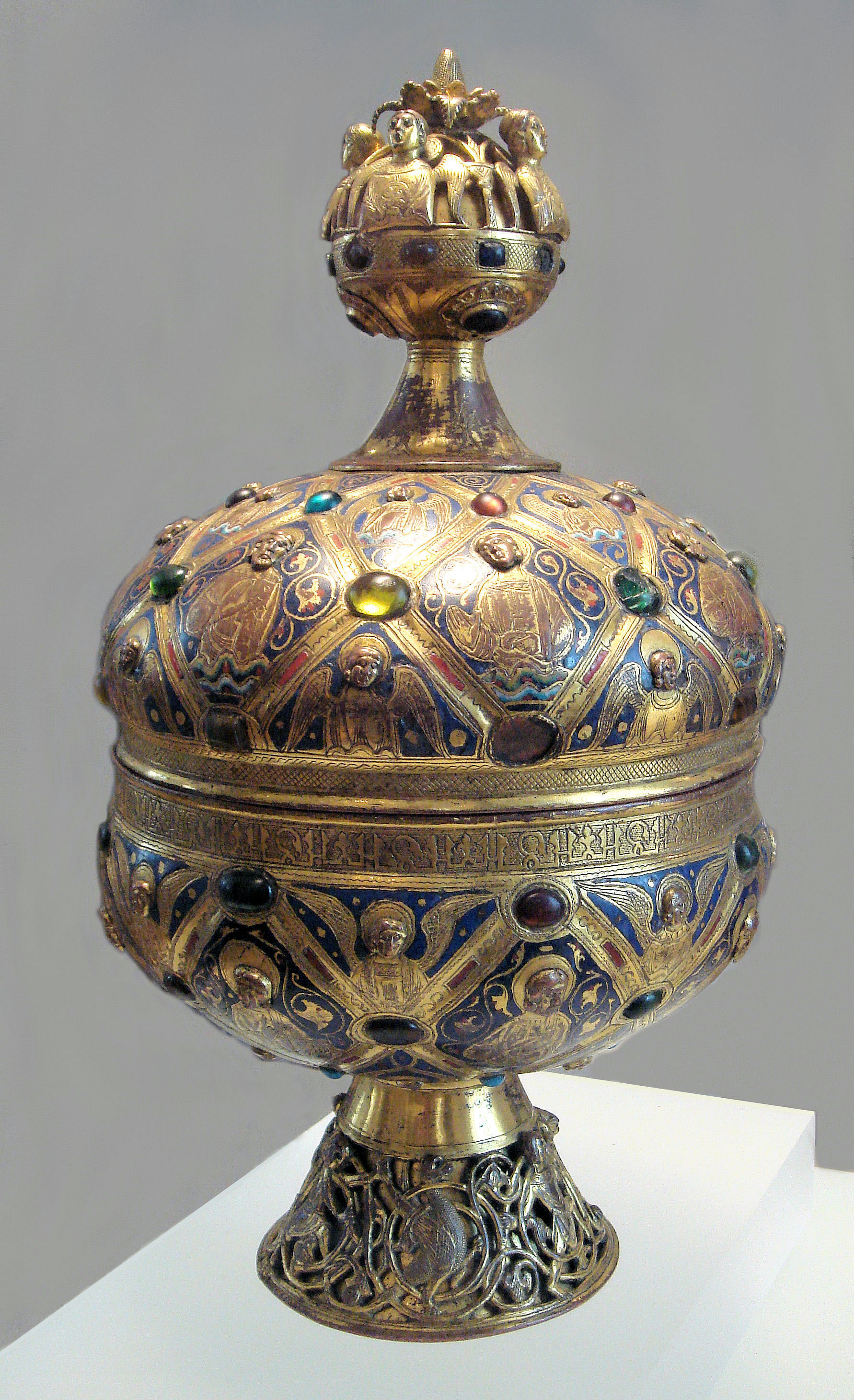
Limoges enamel ciborium with champlevé enamel, and center rim in pseudo-Kufic script, c. 1200

Limoges was evangelized by Saint Martial, who came to the city around 250 with two companions, Alpinianus and Austriclinienus. However, in the late 3rd century it was increasingly abandoned, due to unsafe conditions created by the invasions of various Germanic tribes. The population was concentrated instead in a more easily fortifiable site, the modern Puy Saint-Étienne, which is the centre of the modern Limoges. Starting with the construction of the Abbey of St. Martial (9th century), another settlement grew around the tomb of the saint, while a third area, next to the residence of the viscount (the future Castle of Saint Martial), seems to have been populated from the 10th century.

Starting from the 11th century, thanks to the presence of the Abbey of St. Martial and its large library, Limoges became a flourishing artistic centre. It was home to an important school of medieval music composition, which is usually called the St. Martial School; its most famous member was the 13th-century troubadour Bertran de Born.

In the 13th century, at the peak of its splendour, central Limoges consisted of two fortified settlements.

- The town proper, with a new line of walls encompassing the Vienne River, inhabited mainly by clerks and workers. It has a bridge on the Vienne river named after Saint-Étienne, built by the bishops, and a developed port. Sacked in 1370, it never recovered entirely.
- The castle, with 12-metre-high (39 ft) walls, including the abbey controlled by the abbot, sometimes in contrast with the bishop-ruled town ("la Cité"). Traces of the walls can still be seen in the city centre. Outside the lines of walls were the popular quarters.

In 1370, Limoges was occupied by Edward of Woodstock, the Black Prince, who massacred some 300 residents, "perhaps a sixth of the normal population", with another 60 members of the garrison of 140 dead as well.

=== Modern history ===
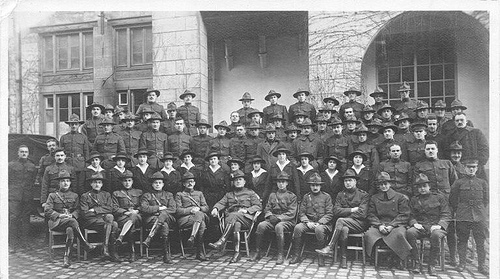
Yale Mobile Hospital Unit No. 39 stationed at the Limoges factory, Christmas, 1917

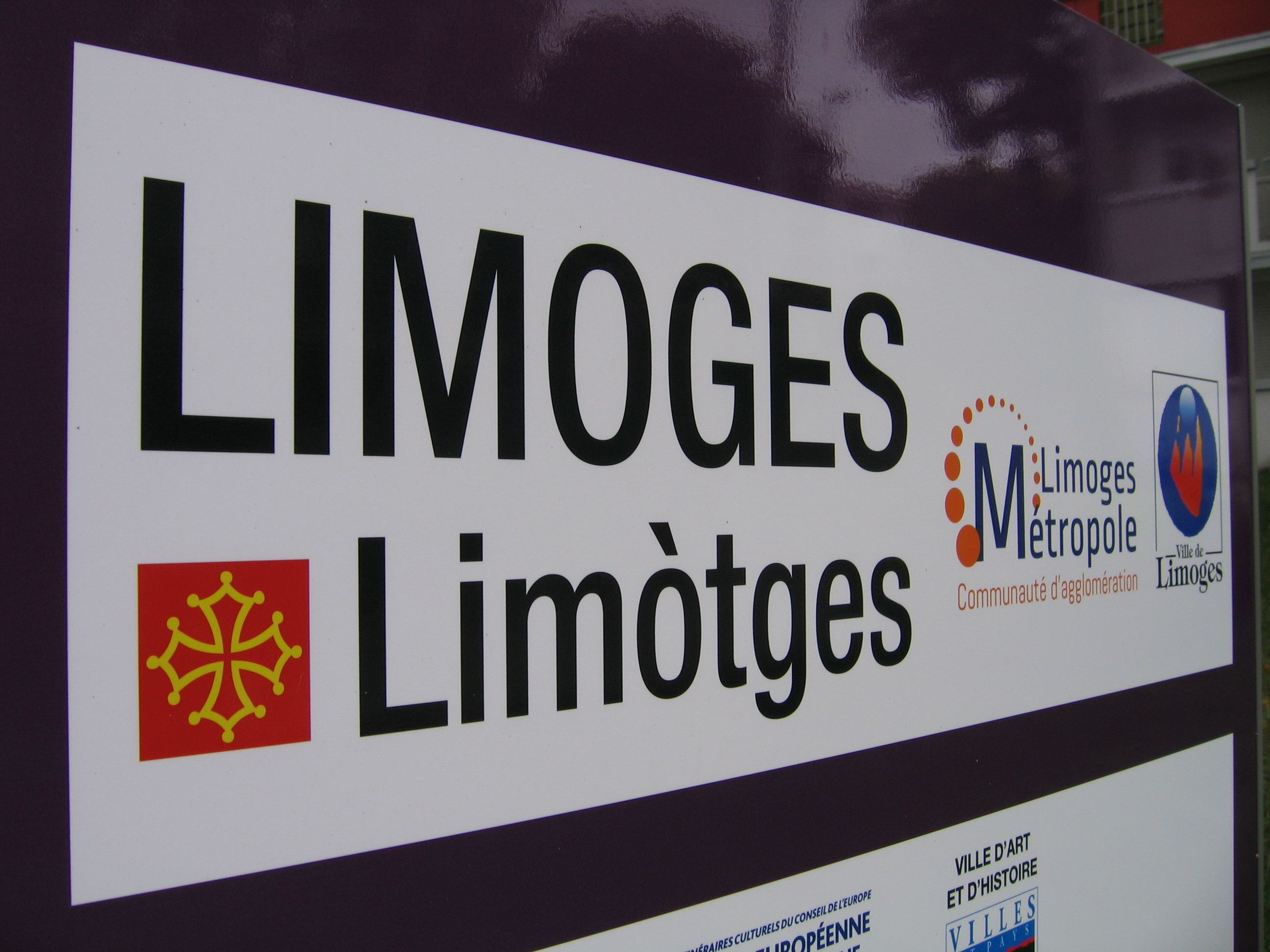
Occitan and French name of the city

The porcelain industry started to develop, favoured by the presence of kaolinite which was discovered near Limoges in 1768 (near Saint-Yrieix-la-Perche, southwest of Limoges). Many of the inhabitants became employed in the new sector or in connected activities (including the lumbering of wood needed for firing the porcelain) in manufacture and exporting needed for European distribution of Limoges Boxes, dinnerware, and other porcelain wares. Because the Limousin region has had a long history of breeding (Baronet sheep and Limousine cows), the leather industry also settled in and around Limoges along the banks of the Vienne–the river providing the necessary water and power. Factories in Limoges and Saint-Junien still produce luxury leather shoes, gloves, and bags.

The city and castle were united in 1792 to form the single city of Limoges. During the French Revolution several religious edifices, considered symbols of the Ancien Régime, were destroyed by the population: these included the Abbey of St. Martial itself.

In the 19th century Limoges saw strong construction activity, which included the destruction and rebuilding of much of the city centre. The unsafe conditions of the poorer population is highlighted by the outbreak of several riots, including that of July–November 1830 and April 1848. The first French confederation of workers, the Confédération Générale du Travail (CGT; General Confederation of Labour), was created in Limoges in 1895.

In early 1905, strikes began in another local industry, shoe factories soon followed in the porcelain factories. Barricades were built, the army intervened. There would be two casualties: a horse and a young porcelain worker, Camille Vardelle.

Limoges' historic city hall collapsing in flames, October 2026

During World War II, many Jews from Alsace were evacuated to Limoges and the surrounding area. The 2nd SS Panzer Division Das Reich was stationed near Saint-Junien. After meetings in Limoges and Saint-Junien, the decision was made to carry out the Oradour-sur-Glane massacre on 10 June 1944. This division's mission was to free another battalion commander, Major Helmut Kämpfe, who was later executed on the orders of Georges Guingouin. A monument designed by the artist Sanfourche commemorates these events in Moissannes. Limoges was liberated on 21 August 1944 by the French Resistance led by Colonel Guingouin, without any fighting, after negotiations with General Walter Gleiniger.

In October 2026, the 143-year-old city hall, the Hôtel de Ville, was set on fire by rioters during the 2026 French student protests. The building was largely destroyed.

== Climate ==
Limoges experiences an oceanic climate (Köppen climate classification: Cfb) common to much of Western France. Most precipitation occurs between October and February. On 27 December 1999, winds reached 148 km/h (92 mph). On average, the city experiences 41 days of frost and 18 days of snow each winter. In June, July and August, precipitation tends to come only from violent thunderstorms coming from the Bay of Biscay.

Climate data for Limoges - Bellegarde (LIG), elevation: 402 m (1,319 ft) (1991–2020 normals, extremes 1973–present)
Month	Jan	Feb	Mar	Apr	May	Jun	Jul	Aug	Sep	Oct	Nov	Dec	Year
Record high °C (°F)	17.7 (63.9)	23.1 (73.6)	24.7 (76.5)	27.8 (82.0)	33.2 (91.8)	39.3 (102.7)	38.2 (100.8)	38.2 (100.8)	34.5 (94.1)	30.0 (86.0)	22.9 (73.2)	18.3 (64.9)	38.2 (100.8)
Mean daily maximum °C (°F)	7.2 (45.0)	8.4 (47.1)	12.1 (53.8)	14.8 (58.6)	18.5 (65.3)	22.0 (71.6)	24.2 (75.6)	24.4 (75.9)	20.6 (69.1)	16.2 (61.2)	10.7 (51.3)	7.9 (46.2)	15.6 (60.1)
Daily mean °C (°F)	4.6 (40.3)	5.1 (41.2)	8.2 (46.8)	10.6 (51.1)	14.1 (57.4)	17.5 (63.5)	19.5 (67.1)	19.6 (67.3)	16.2 (61.2)	12.7 (54.9)	7.8 (46.0)	5.3 (41.5)	11.8 (53.2)
Mean daily minimum °C (°F)	1.9 (35.4)	1.7 (35.1)	4.3 (39.7)	6.4 (43.5)	9.8 (49.6)	13.0 (55.4)	14.7 (58.5)	14.8 (58.6)	11.9 (53.4)	9.2 (48.6)	5.0 (41.0)	2.6 (36.7)	7.9 (46.2)
Record low °C (°F)	−19.2 (−2.6)	−15.0 (5.0)	−9.6 (14.7)	−4.7 (23.5)	−0.6 (30.9)	4.0 (39.2)	7.2 (45.0)	5.4 (41.7)	2.6 (36.7)	−2.6 (27.3)	−7.2 (19.0)	−10.6 (12.9)	−19.2 (−2.6)
Average precipitation mm (inches)	90.6 (3.57)	75.0 (2.95)	77.8 (3.06)	87.7 (3.45)	92.6 (3.65)	80.0 (3.15)	62.5 (2.46)	71.6 (2.82)	74.9 (2.95)	94.2 (3.71)	106.1 (4.18)	105.0 (4.13)	1,018 (40.08)
Average precipitation days (≥ 1.0 mm)	13.2	11.2	11.2	12.0	11.2	9.5	8.3	8.1	9.7	12.1	13.9	13.3	133.7
Average snowy days	4.0	4.8	2.2	1.2	0.1	0.0	0.0	0.0	0.0	0.1	1.7	3.1	17.2
Average relative humidity (%)	85	80	76	71	75	73	71	72	75	80	82	84	77
Mean monthly sunshine hours	79.6	104.1	157.6	173.0	205.6	224.4	243.5	236.8	198.0	135.0	85.6	78.9	1,922
Source 1: Meteociel
Source 2: Infoclimat.fr (relative humidity 1961–1990)

== Demographics ==
In 2018, the population of the commune proper was 131,479, and of the Limoges functional urban area 323,789. Inhabitants of Limoges are called Limougeauds in French. The population data in the table and graph below refer to the commune of Limoges proper, in its geography at the given years. The commune of Limoges absorbed the former commune of Beaune-les-Mines in 1962.

Historical population

Year	Pop.	±% p.a.
1793	20,864	—
1800	20,255	−0.42%
1806	21,757	+1.20%
1821	24,992	+0.93%
1831	27,070	+0.80%
1836	29,706	+1.88%
1841	29,870	+0.11%
1846	38,119	+5.00%
1851	41,630	+1.78%
1856	46,564	+2.27%
1861	51,053	+1.86%
1866	53,022	+0.76%
1872	55,134	+0.65%
1876	59,011	+1.71%
1881	63,765	+1.56%
1886	68,477	+1.44%
1891	72,697	+1.20%
1896	77,703	+1.34%
1901	84,121	+1.60%

Year	Pop.	±% p.a.
1906	88,597	+1.04%
1911	92,181	+0.80%
1921	90,187	−0.22%
1926	98,209	+1.72%
1931	92,577	−1.17%
1936	95,217	+0.56%
1946	107,857	+1.25%
1954	105,990	−0.22%
1962	118,576	+1.41%
1968	132,935	+1.92%
1975	143,725	+1.12%
1982	140,400	−0.33%
1990	133,464	−0.63%
1999	133,968	+0.04%
2007	138,882	+0.45%
2012	136,221	−0.39%
2017	132,175	−0.60%
2023	129,937	−0.28%

Source: EHESS and INSEE (1968-2023)

== Main sights ==
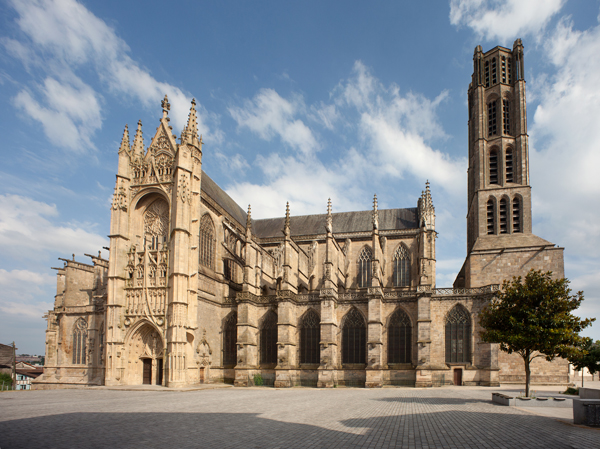
St Étienne Cathedral, Limoges

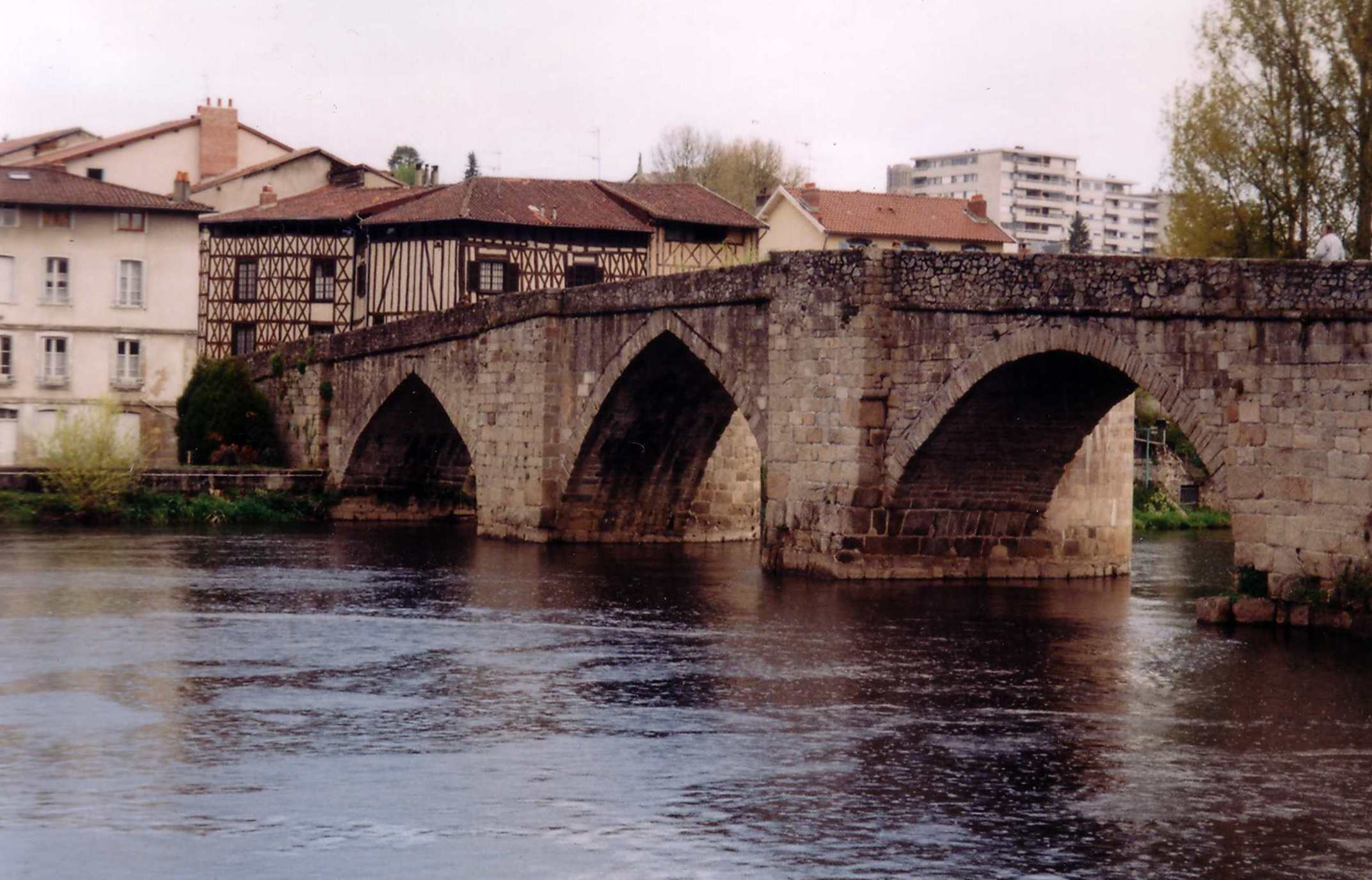
Saint Martial Bridge

Gare des Bénédictins

The Hôtel de Ville (2009), before 2026 arson

- The Crypt of Saint Martial, 10th century, including the tomb of the bishop who evangelized the city. It was discovered in the 1960s while building an underground parking lot (place de la république).
- Remains of the Gallo-Roman amphitheatre, one of the largest in ancient Gaul.
- The Gothic Limoges Cathedral (Cathédrale Saint-Étienne de Limoges), begun in 1273 and only finished in 1888. It is noted for a fine loft built in 1534 and for the partly octagonal bell tower. The main artistic works are a Renaissance rood screen and the tomb of the bishop Jean de Langeac, with sculpted scenes of the Apocalypse.
- The Chapelle Saint-Aurélien (14th–17th centuries). It includes the relics of St. Aurelian, the second bishop of Limoges, and has medieval statues and Baroque works of art.
- The church of St-Pierre-du-Queyroix, begun in the 12th century
- The Church of St-Michel-des-Lions, begun in 1364. It houses the relics of St. Martial and has stained-glass windows from the 15th–16th century. The most striking feature is the 65 m-high tower, with a spire surmounted by a big bronze ball.
- The bridges of Saint Martial (dating from the Roman era) and of St-Étienne (13th century).
- The Limoges Fine Arts Museum (Musée des Beaux-Arts), housed in the 18th-century bishops' palace ('Palais de l'Évêché').
- The Hôtel de Ville, completed in 1883, bell tower and roof burnt down on 17 October 2026.
- The railway station, Gare de Limoges Bénédictins, inaugurated in 1929.
- The Château de La Borie (17th century), 4 km (2.5 mi) from the city. It is home to the Centre Culturel de Rencontre de La Borie et l'Ensemble Baroque de Limoges.
- The remains of the 12th-century Castle of Chalucet, 10 km (6.2 mi) south of the city. During the Hundred Years' War it was a base of bands of pillagers who ravaged the country.
- The city's botanical gardens include the Jardin botanique de l'Evêché next to the cathedral.
- The University of Limoges was founded in 1968.

== Art and literature ==
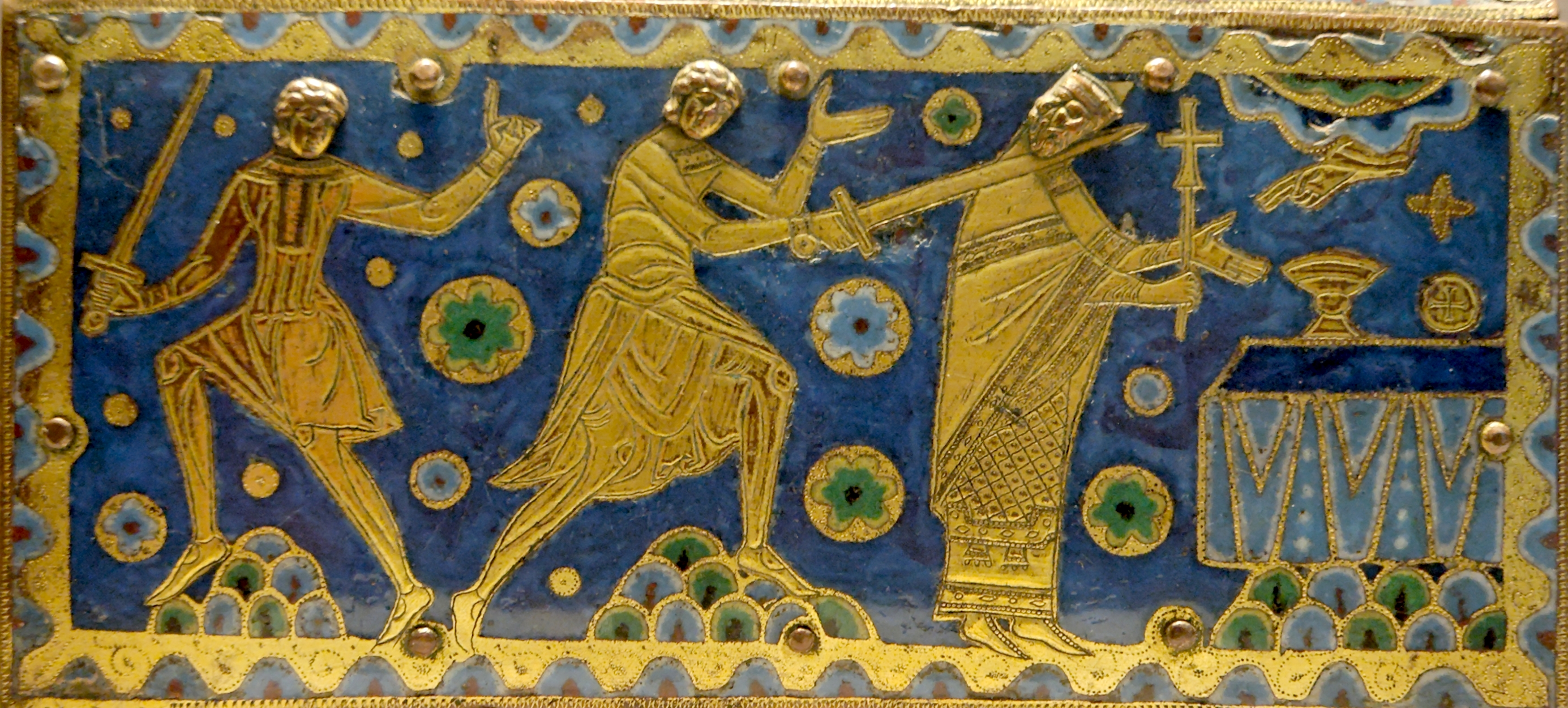
The murder of Thomas Becket, Limoges enamel, 12th century, Louvre Museum

"Le marché de Limoges" (Limoges market) is the name of a section of Pictures at an Exhibition by Modest Mussorgsky.

In 1768, kaolin, a rock rich in fine, white clay which is used for making porcelain, was discovered at Saint-Yrieix-la-Perche, 30 km south of Limoges. Under the impetus of the progressive economist Anne Robert Jacques Turgot, Baron de Laune, who had been appointed intendant of this impoverished and isolated region, a new ceramics industry was developed, and Limoges porcelain became famous during the 19th century. However, Limoges porcelain is a generic term for porcelain produced in Limoges rather than at a specific factory (there are still several porcelain factories in and around Limoges). More than 50% of all porcelain made in France comes from Limoges.

== Education ==
Limoges hosts the national ceramics school École d'ingénieurs ENSIL-ENSCI, created in 1893, and also the University of Limoges.

== Sports ==
The city is one of France's basketball capitals. The Palais des Sports de Beaublanc, has been host for international basketball events such as the EuroBasket 1983 and serves as home court for the professional team CSP Limoges (Cercle St Pierre). Since 1983, the club has been French champion 11 times (1983, 1984, 1985, 1988, 1989, 1990, 1993, 1994, 2000, 2014, 2015) and 5 European titles (1982, 1983, 2000 (Korac Cup), 1988 (FIBA Saporta Cup), 1993 (Euroleague)). It was the first French club team to become European champion in a collective sport. The team currently plays in Pro A, the French first basketball professional league.

The city's main stadium is the Beaublanc Stadium.

Limoges Hand 87 is a French handball team based in Limoges, France, which is currently playing in the Division 2 of Ligue Nationale de Handball.

Limoges FC was the major city association football team before the club folded in 2020 during the COVID-19 pandemic. Their home games were played at Stade St. Lazare.

USA Limoges is an amateur rugby union club, based in Limoges. Currently competing in Fédérale 1, the top level of the French amateur rugby pyramid and one level below the professional leagues.

== Transport ==
The main railway station of Limoges is the Limoges-Bénédictins station. It offers direct connections with Paris, and Toulouse, and several regional destinations. Limoges was the last major urban centre of Metropolitan France to be connected to the national motorway system; since the early 1990s, the motorway A20 has connected Limoges with Châteauroux, Vierzon, Orléans and Paris to the north, and Brive-la-Gaillarde, Cahors, Montauban and Toulouse to the south. The nearest airport is Limoges – Bellegarde Airport.

Urban transport in Limoges and its metropolitan area is operated by Société de transports en commun de Limoges Métropole (STCL). The Limoges urban bus network includes the Limoges trolleybus system, one of only four such systems currently operating in France.

== Notable people ==
- Bernard Gui (1261–1331), Inquisitor of Toulouse, Bishop of Lodève, buried in Limoges.
- Pierre de Casa Prior General of the Order of Carmelites then Became Bishop of the Diocese of Vaison (1341–1348) and Latin Patriarch of Jerusalem (1342–1348)
- Jean Daurat (or Dorat) (1508–1588), poet and scholar, member of the Pléiade
- Henri François d'Aguesseau (1668–1751), chancellor of France
- Jean-Baptiste Jourdan (1762–1833), marshal of France
- Stephen Grellet (1773–1855), Quaker missionary
- Thomas Robert Bugeaud de la Piconnerie, Duke of Duchy of Isly (1784–1849), marshal of France
- Jean Cruveilhier (1791–1874), anatomist and pathologist, born in Limoges
- Michel Chevalier (1806–1879), engineer, economist, and statesman
- Élie Berthet (1815–1891), writer
- Jean-Baptiste Joseph Émile Montégut (1825–1895), critic
- Marie François Sadi Carnot (1837–1894), President of France
- Pierre-Auguste Renoir (1841–1919), painter
- Émile Labussière (1853-1924), politician, mayor of Limoges (1889-1892)
- André Antoine (1858–1943), theater pioneer, actor, director, filmmaker
- René Navarre (1877–1968), actor
- Marcel Vardelle (1883–1969), politician
- Roger Gonthier (1884–1978), architect
- Raoul Hausmann (1886–1971), artist
- Maryse Bastié (1898–1952), aviator
- Jean-Joseph Sanfourche (1929-2010), painter
- Fred Sirieix (born 1972), maître d'hôtel famous for appearing on First Dates.
- Franck Pulcini, 20th-century French trumpeter.
- Fabienne Delsol, singer active since 1996
- Stéphane Delautrette (born 1972), politician
- Guillaume Moreau (born 1983), racing driver
- Marie-Ange Magne (born 1987), politician
- Matthieu Vaxivière (born 1994), racing driver

== Twin towns and sister cities ==
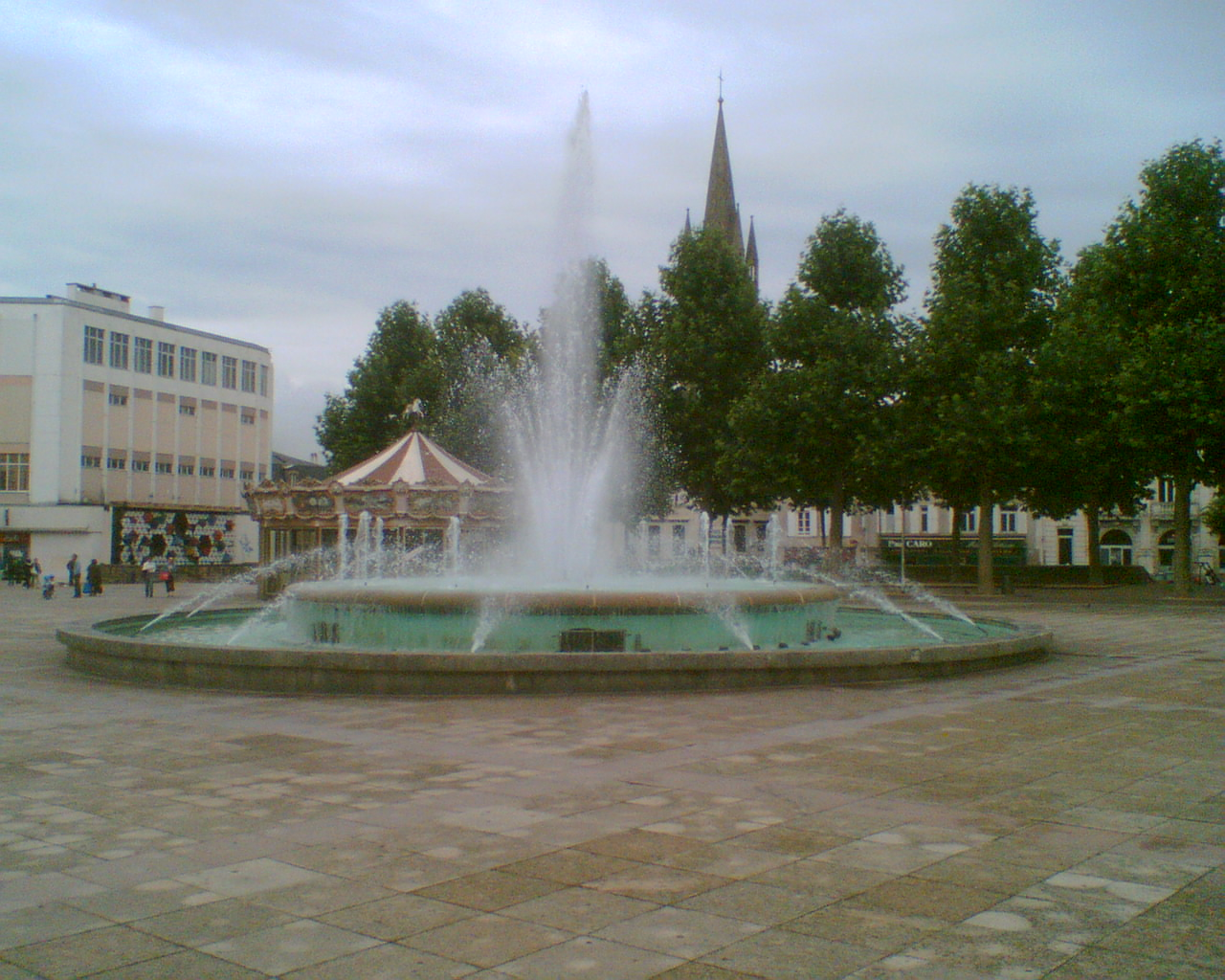
Fountain and Carousel at Place de la République

Limoges is twinned with:

- Charlotte, United States
- Fürth, Germany
- Grodno, Belarus
- Plzeň, Czech Republic
- Seto, Japan
- Icheon, South Korea

== See also ==
- Roman Catholic Diocese of Limoges, the Bishopric of Limoges
- Communes of the Haute-Vienne department
- Chapel of St. Aurelianus, Limoges
