= Haute-Vienne =

Department of France in Nouvelle-Aquitaine

Haute-Vienne Nauta Vinhana (Occitan) Upper Vienne
- Department of France
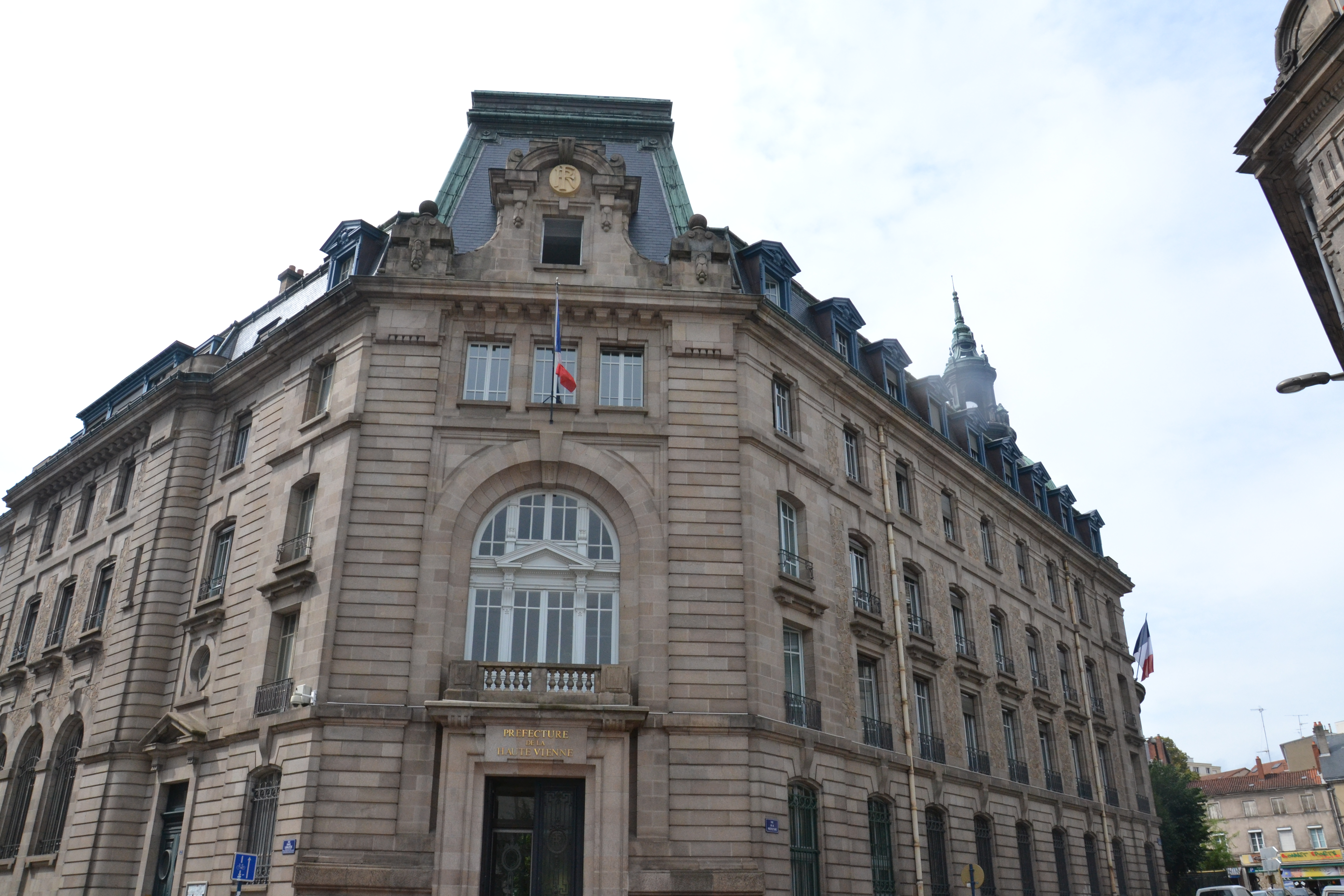
- Prefecture building in Limoges

- Flag Coat of arms

- Location of Haute-Vienne in France
- Coordinates: 45°49′57″N 1°15′25″E
- Country: France
- Region: Nouvelle-Aquitaine
- Prefecture: Limoges
- Subprefectures: Bellac; Rochechouart

Government
  - President of the Departmental Council: Jean-Claude Leblois (PS)

Area^{1}
  - Total: 5,520 km^{2} (2,130 sq mi)

Population (2023)
  - Total: 373,167
  - Rank: 65th
  - Density: 67.6/km^{2} (175/sq mi)
- Time zone: UTC+1 (CET)
  - Summer (DST): UTC+2 (CEST)
- Department number: 87
- Arrondissements: 3
- Cantons: 21
- Communes: 195
- ^1 French Land Register data, which exclude estuaries and lakes, ponds and glaciers larger than 1 km^{2}

Haute-Vienne (French: [ot vjɛn]; Occitan: Nauta Vinhana or Nauta Viena), also translated as Upper Vienne, is a department in the Nouvelle-Aquitaine region in southwest-central France. Named after the Vienne River, it is one of the twelve départements that together constitute Nouvelle-Aquitaine. The prefecture and largest city in the department is Limoges, the other towns in the department each having fewer than twenty thousand inhabitants. Haute-Vienne had a population of 373,167 in 2023.

== Geography ==
Haute-Vienne is part of the Nouvelle-Aquitaine region. It is bordered by six departments; Creuse lies to the east, Corrèze to the south, Dordogne to the southwest, Charente to the west, Vienne to the northwest and Indre to the north. The département has two main rivers which cross it from east to west; the Vienne, on which the two main cities, Limoges and Saint-Junien, are situated, and the Gartempe, a tributary of the Creuse. To the southeast of the department lies the Massif Central, and the highest point in the department is Puy Lagarde, 795 m (2,608 ft). The source of the Charente is in the department, in the commune of Chéronnac, near Rochechouart.

At the west end of the department is the Rochechouart impact structure, an impact crater caused by a meteorite that crashed into the Earth's surface over 200 million years ago; because of subsequent erosion, little sign of the crater is in evidence today apart from the geologic effects on the surrounding rock.

=== Principal towns ===
The most populous commune is Limoges, the prefecture. As of 2023, there are 7 communes with more than 6,000 inhabitants:

Commune	Population (2023)
Limoges	129,937
Saint-Junien	11,415
Panazol	11,342
Couzeix	10,195
Isle	7,995
Saint-Yrieix-la-Perche	6,830
Feytiat	6,176

=== Subdivisions ===
The three arrondissements of the Haute-Vienne department are:

1. Arrondissement of Bellac, (subprefecture: Bellac) with 57 communes.
2. Arrondissement of Limoges, (prefecture of the Haute-Vienne department: Limoges) with 108 communes.
3. Arrondissement of Rochechouart, (subprefecture: Rochechouart) with 30 communes.

Haute-Vienne consists of 21 cantons.

== History ==
A few Paleolithic and Mesolithic remains have been found in the department, Neolithic inhabitants are attested to by standing stones and by burial chambers, like the dolmen Chez Boucher in La Croix-sur-Gartempe, and others at Berneuil and Breuilaufa. Artefacts from the Bronze Age include axe heads found at Châlus. With the coming of the Romans, trade was opened up and gold and tin were mined. Agriculture developed and grapes were grown; amphorae for storing wine were found at Saint-Gence. During the reign of Augustus, the city of Augustoritum was founded (later to become Limoges) at a strategic ford across the Vienne. The Romans built roads from here to Brittany, Lyon and the Mediterranean. The city declined in the third century when barbarian invasions of the region took place.

The domination of the Visigoths was short-lived and Clovis I seized control of Limousin after the battle of Vouillé in 507. By 674, the region was attached to the duchy of Aquitaine, and the Viscount of Limoges was created. There followed an unsettled period with various powers vying for control. In 1199, Richard Cœur de Lion was mortally wounded during the siege of the Château de Châlus-Chabrol. The region was much involved in the Hundred Years' War and at the Treaty of Brétigny in 1360, France granted England a large area of territory comprising much of Limousin. Limoges city rebelled and gave its allegiance to the French crown, and as a result was sacked in 1370. Further troubled years followed but when peace was restored, the department benefited economically; tanneries sprang up by the Vienne, paper was produced, printing developed and the area became known for fine enamelwork. After a revolt by the peasants, Henri IV brought peace and prosperity to the region of Limousin. He visited Limoges in 1607 and was greeted enthusiastically. The Counter-Reformation led to the creation of numerous convents and religious orders, especially in Limoges. In 1761, Anne Robert Jacques Turgot was appointed intendent (tax collector) of Limoges. He negotiated a reduction in taxes payable by the region and developed fairer methods of collecting taxes, as well as improving the road system and encouraging agricultural development. Around 1765, kaolin was discovered near Saint-Yrieix-la-Perche in the south of the department, and the porcelain industry developed.

The department was created on 4 March 1790, during the French Revolution, the southern half being a subdivision of the Region of Limousin while the northern half was carved out of the county of Marche, as well as some parts of Angoumois and Poitou. At first it was given the number 81, but in the nineteenth century, the number was changed to the 87th department, when further land to the east and northeast was added. It takes its name from the upper reaches of the Vienne which flows through it. In 1998, the southwest part of the department, together with the northern part of the region of Périgord was designated as the Parc Naturel Régional Périgord-Limousin.

== Economy ==
In 2013, twenty million euros were earned from agriculture in the province, as against twenty-one million three hundred thousand from Limousin. There were 351,475 cattle in Haute-Vienne, 22,780 pigs, 320,500 sheep and 6,500 goats. 723,340 hectolitres of milk were produced from cows and 30,690 hectolitres from sheep. In the same year, 1,897,800 hectares of cereals were grown and in the previous year, 12,294 hectares of land were producing organic foodstuffs.

== Demographics ==
Historical population

Year	Pop.	±% p.a.
1801	245,150	—
1821	272,330	+0.53%
1831	285,130	+0.46%
1841	292,848	+0.27%
1851	319,379	+0.87%
1861	319,595	+0.01%
1872	322,447	+0.08%
1881	349,332	+0.89%
1891	372,878	+0.65%
1901	381,753	+0.24%
1911	384,736	+0.08%
1921	350,235	−0.94%
1931	335,873	−0.42%

Year	Pop.	±% p.a.
1936	333,589	−0.14%
1946	336,313	+0.08%
1954	324,429	−0.45%
1962	332,514	+0.31%
1968	341,589	+0.45%
1975	352,149	+0.44%
1982	355,737	+0.14%
1990	353,593	−0.08%
1999	353,893	+0.01%
2007	371,102	+0.60%
2012	375,869	+0.26%
2017	374,426	−0.08%
2023	373,167	−0.06%

In 1801, the population of the department was 245,150. It grew steadily over the next century so that in 1901 it was 381,753. It peaked at 385,732 in 1906, fell back slightly in 1911 to 384,736 and fell sharply to 350,235 in 1921, after the Great War. By 1954 it had dwindled to 324,429 but after that it began to rise again, and in 2007 stood at 371,102.

== Politics ==
The president of the Departmental Council is Jean-Claude Leblois, first elected in 2015.

=== Current National Assembly Representatives ===
Constituency	Member	Party
Haute-Vienne's 1st constituency	Damien Maudet	LFI
Haute-Vienne's 2nd constituency	Stéphane Delautrette	PS
Haute-Vienne's 3rd constituency	Manon Meunier	LFI

== Tourism ==
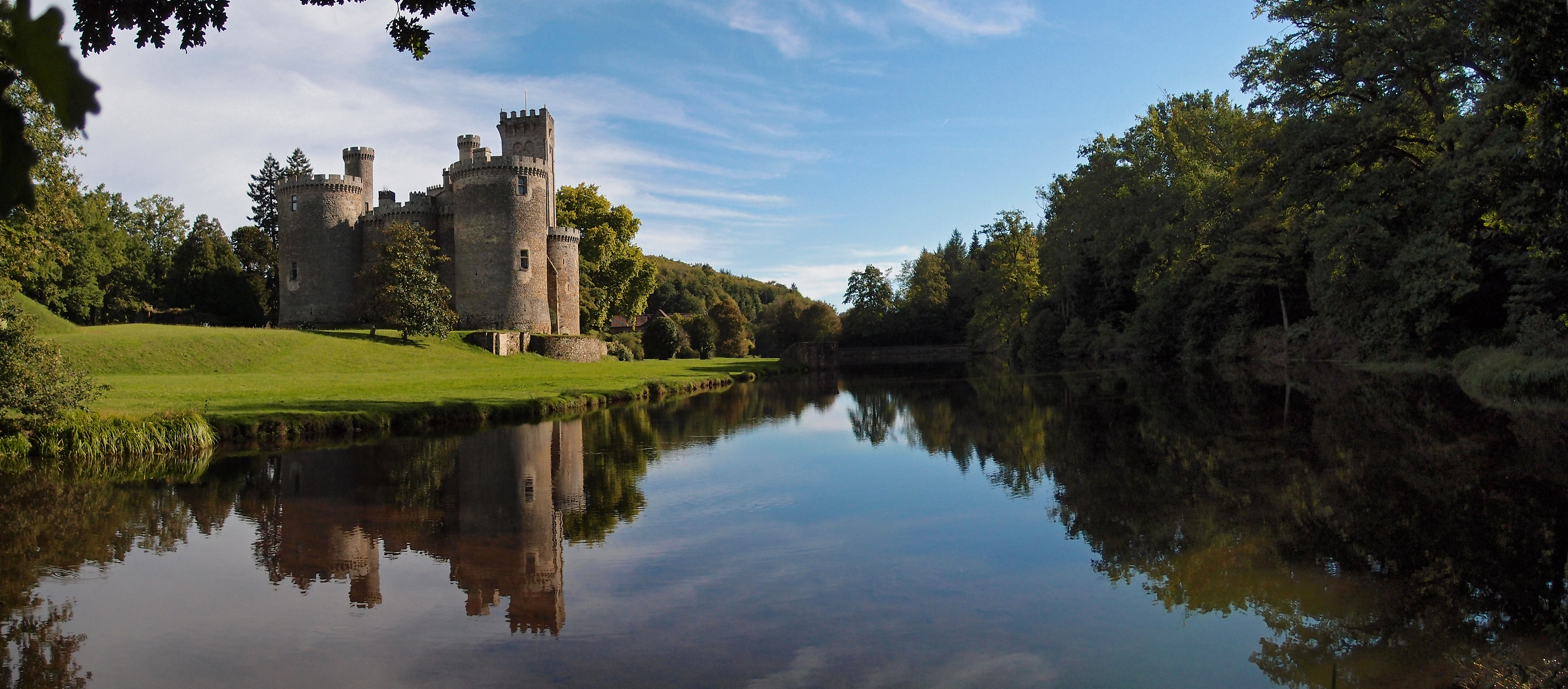
Château de Montbrun

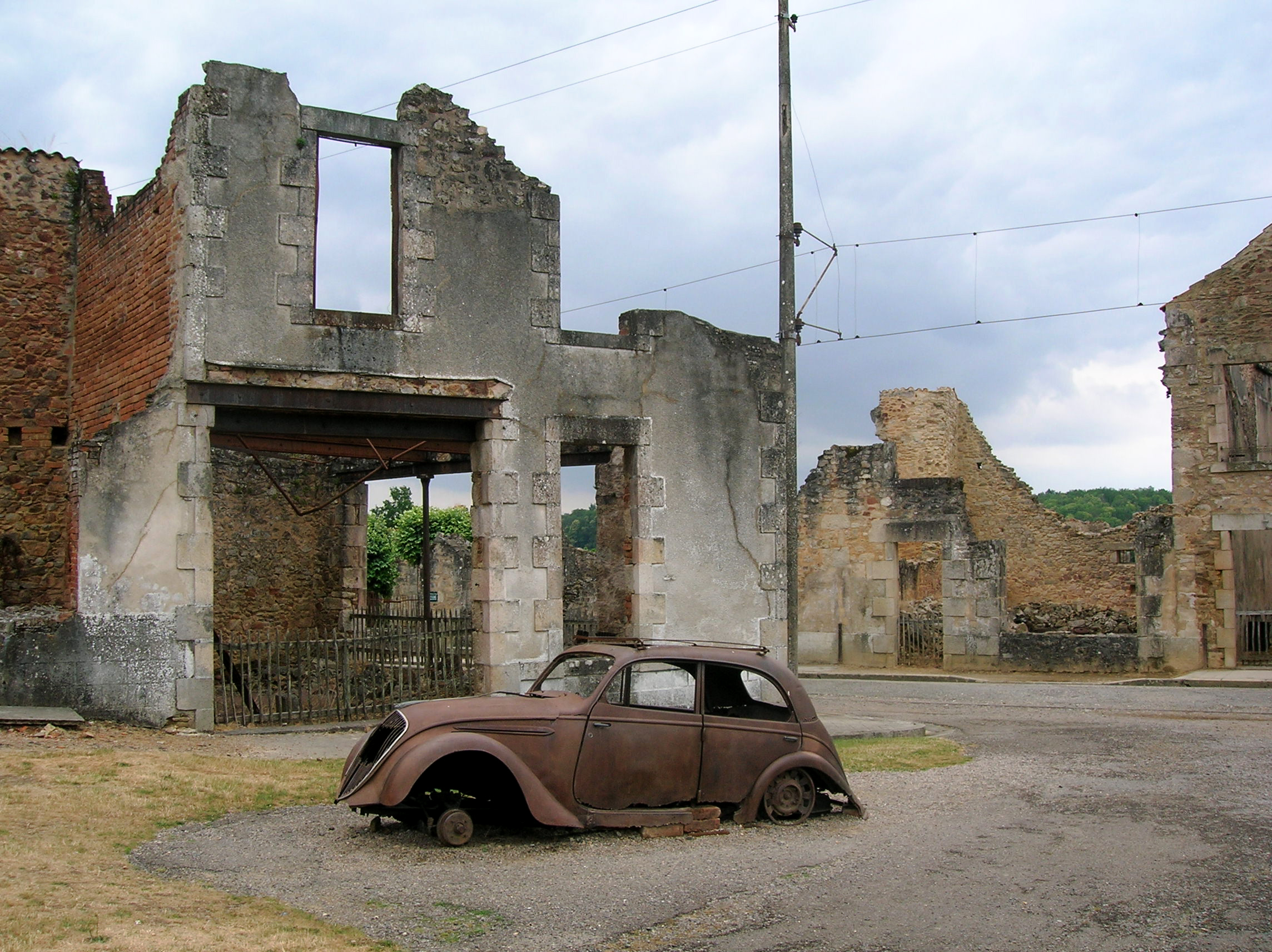
Ruins of Oradour-sur-Glane

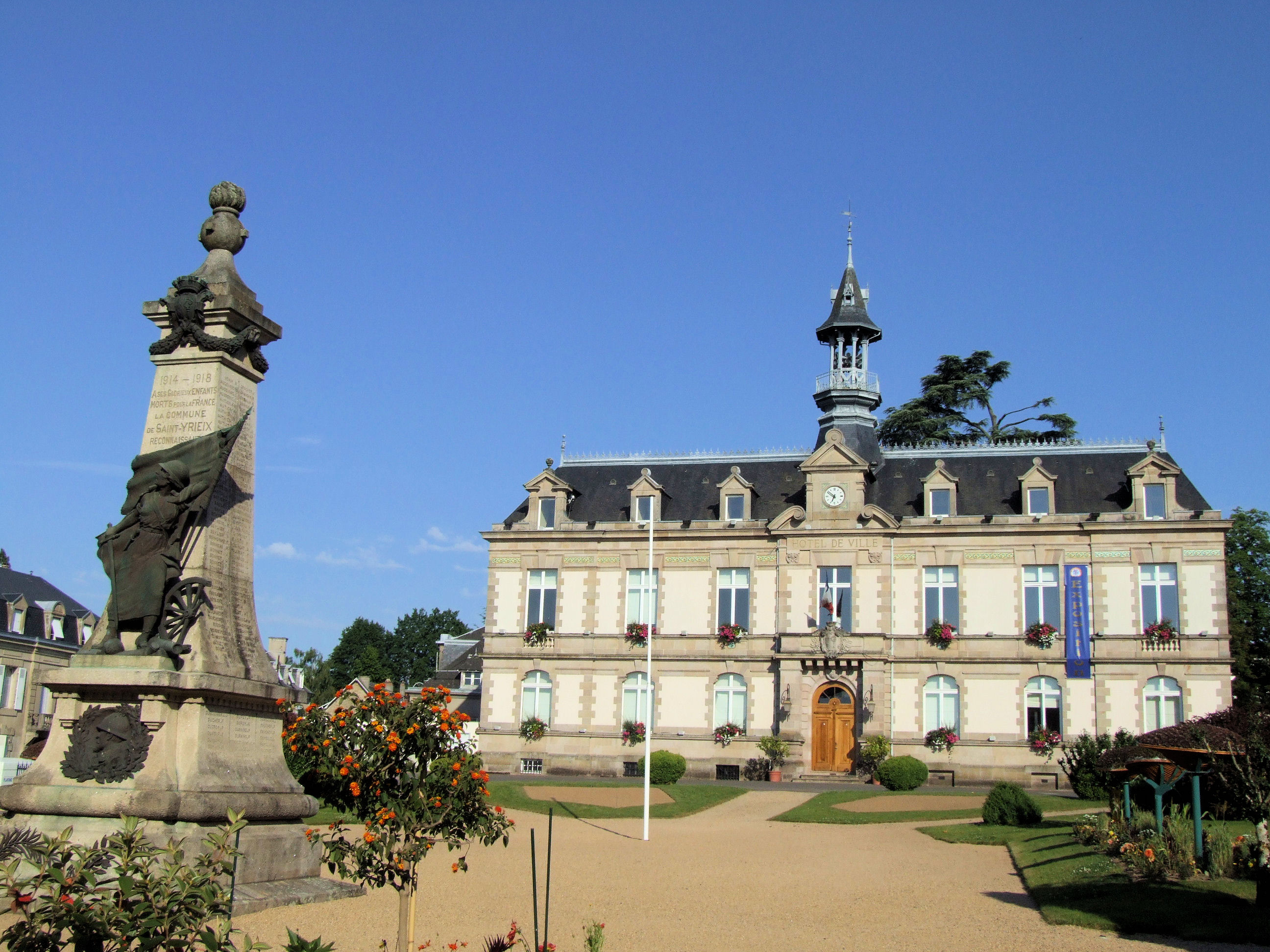
Saint-Yrieix-la-Perche

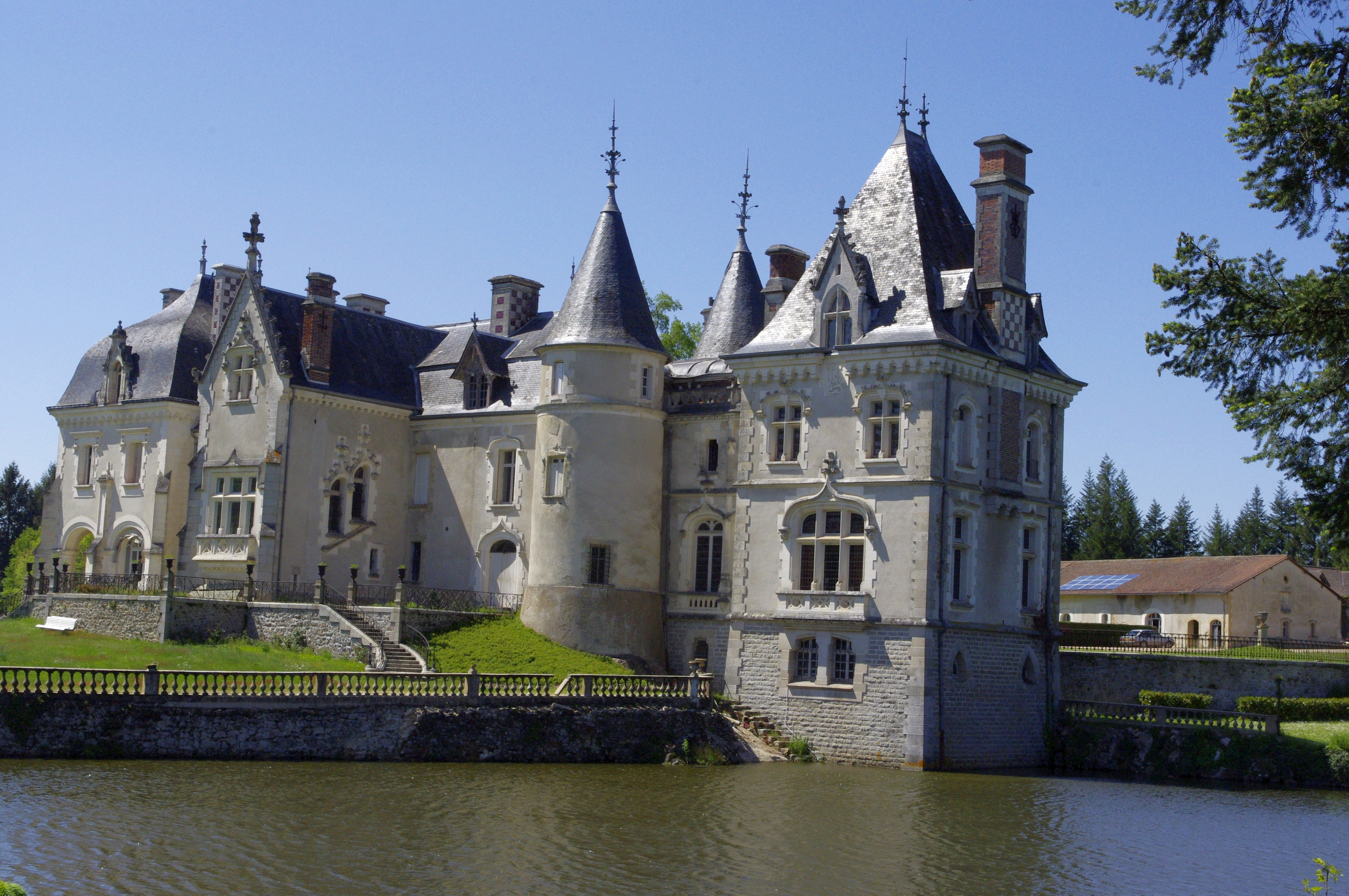
Maisonnais-sur-Tardoire

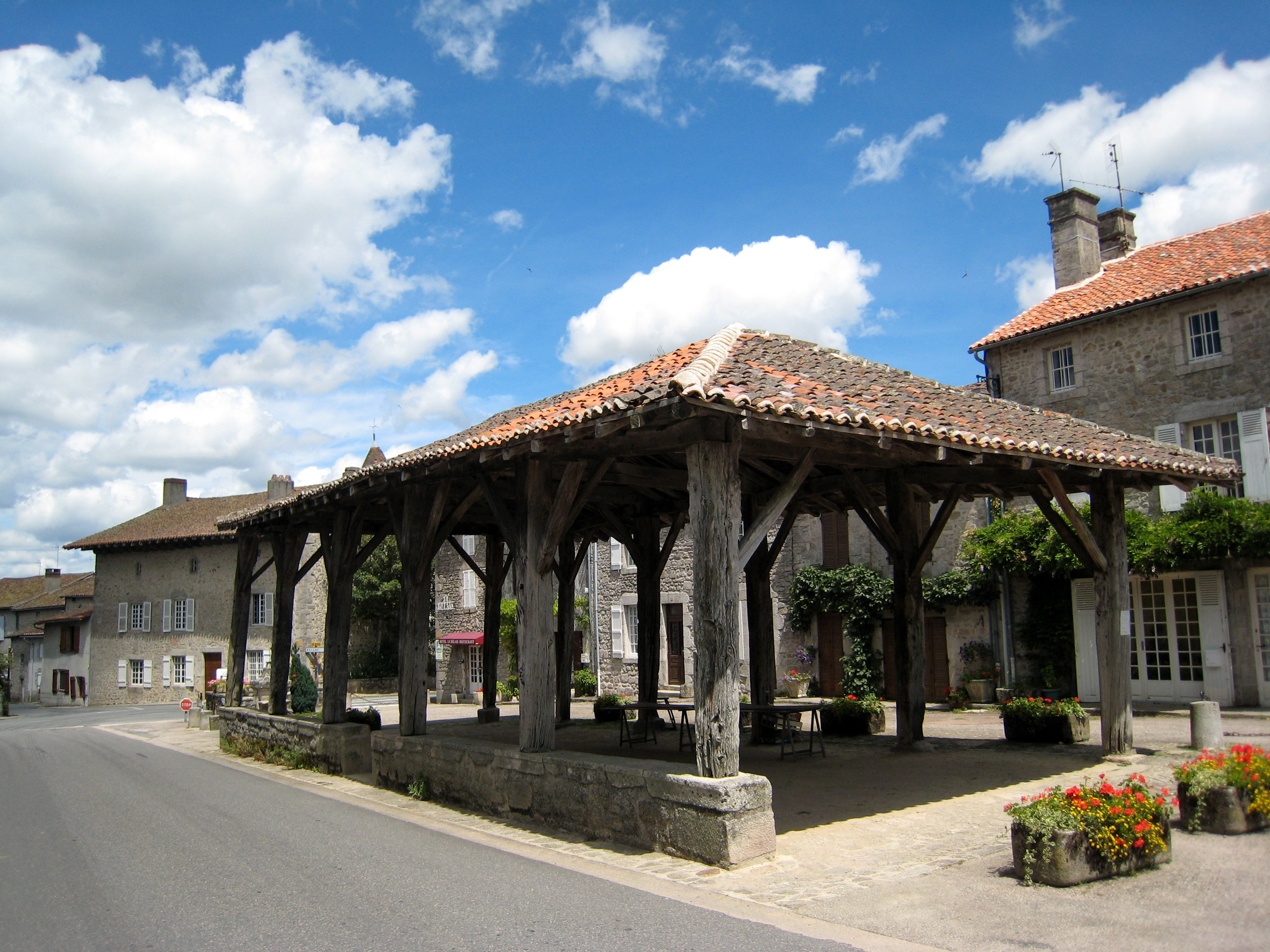
Mortemart

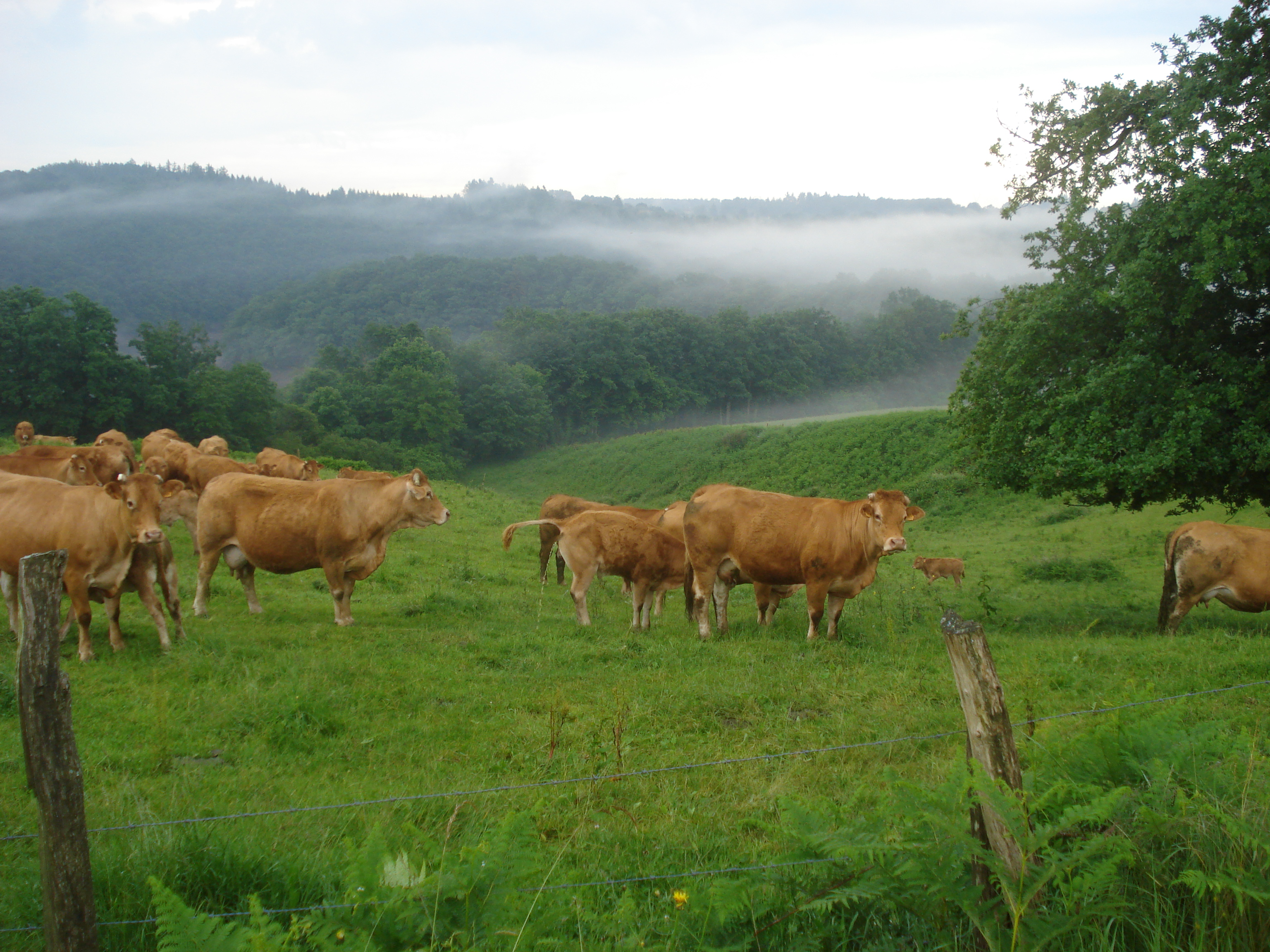
Limousin cows near Saint-Laurent-les-Églises

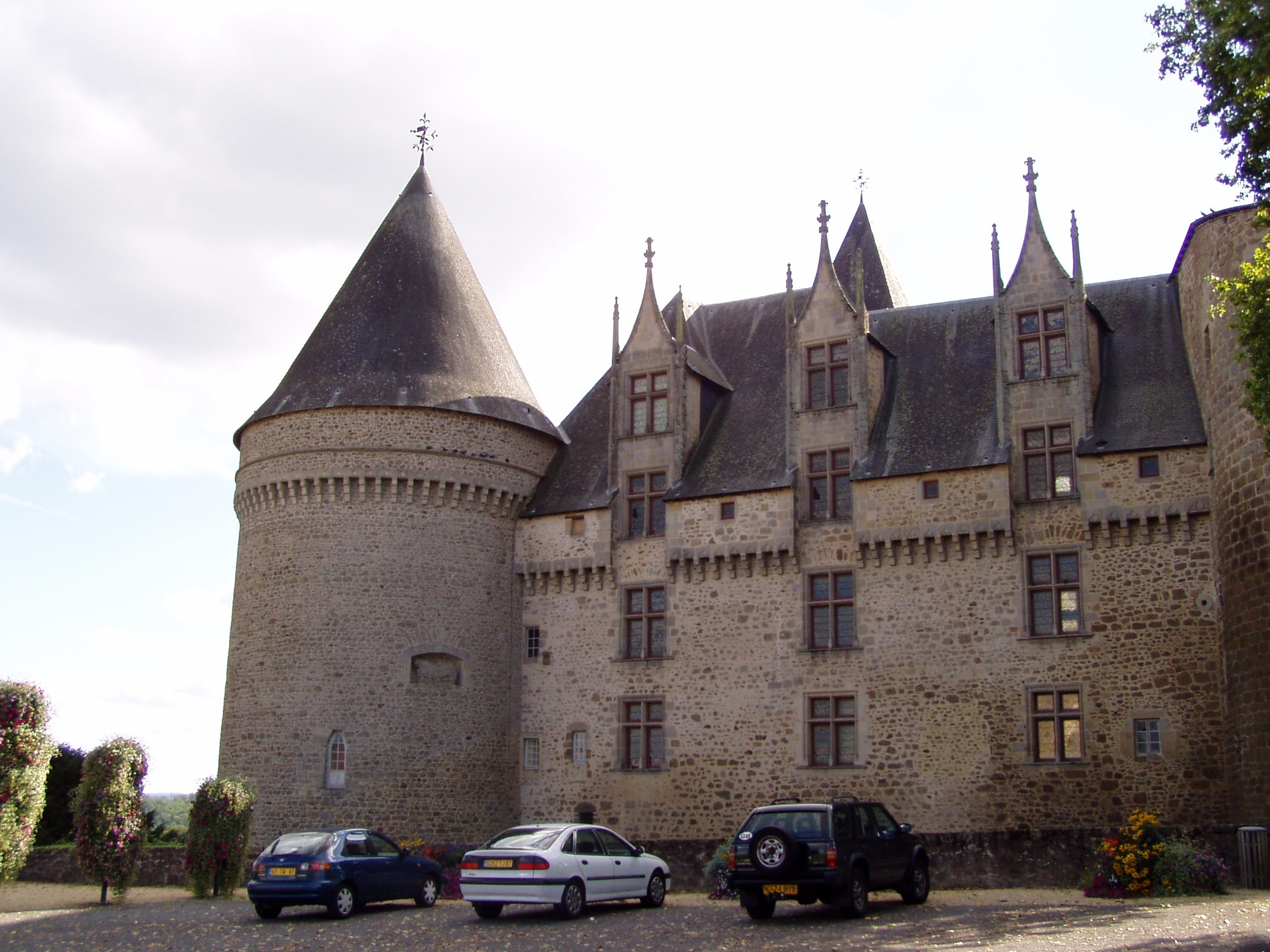
Château de Rochechouart

== Notable people ==
- Martial of Limoges or Saint Martial (third century), also called the apostle of Gaul or the apostle of Aquitaine, is traditionally the first bishop of Limoges.
- Richard the Lion Heart (8 September 1157, Beaumont Palace in Oxford - 6 April 1199, the castle of Chalus Chabrol) was King of England, Duke of Normandy, Duke of Aquitaine, count of Poitiers, Count of Maine and Count of Anjou 1189 until his death in 1199. Son of Henry II of England and Eleanor of Aquitaine.
- Jean-Baptiste Jourdan (1762-1833), Marshal of France.
- Pierre Victurnien Vergniaud (1753-1793), revolutionary.
- Joseph Louis Gay-Lussac (1778-1850), chemist and physicist
- Jean Giraudoux (1882-1944) novelist and diplomat.
- Maryse Bastié (1898-1952) aviator.
- Auguste Renoir (1841-1919), impressionist painter.
- Sadi Carnot (1837-1894), French president.
- Jean Chassagne (26 July 1881– 13 April 1947) was a pioneer submariner, aviator and French racecar driver active 1906–1930.
- Tōson Shimazaki (1872 - 1943), Japanese writer, exiled to Limoges in 1914.
- Suzanne Valadon (1865-1938), painter and artist's model.
- Martial Valin (1898-1980), commander of the Free French Air Force.
- Serge Gainsbourg (Lucien Ginzburg) (1928-1991), took refuge in 1944 in the local high school, to escape the persecution of Jews (his parents had immigrated from Crimea).
- Pierre Desproges (9 May 1939 in Pantin - 18 April 1988 in Paris) is a French comedian known for his dark humor, his nonconformity and sense of the absurd.
- Paul Rebeyrolle (1926-2005), artist.
- Edmond Gondinet (1828-1888), playwright.
- Roland Dumas (1922), politician.
- Georges-Emmanuel Clancier, born 3 May 1914 in Limoges, was a French writer and poet.
- Xavier Darcos (1947), politician.
- Bob Maloubier (2 February 1923 in Neuilly-sur-Seine - 20 April 2015 in Paris) was, during the Second World War, a secret agent of the Special Operations Executive.
- Pascal Sevran (1945-2008), songwriter, television host, who died in Limoges.
- Théo Sarapo is a singer and actor of Greek origin, born Theophanis Lamboukas 26 January 1936 in Paris, died 28 August 1970 in Limoges.
- Jean-Paul Denanot, is a French politician, member of the Socialist Party (PS).
- Robert Hébras (29 June 1925 in Oradour-sur-Glane - 11 February 2023 in Saint-Junien) is one of six people who survived the Oradour-sur-Glane massacre on 10 June 1944.
- Raymond Poulidor, said "Poupou" is a French cyclist, born 15 April 1936 in Masbaraud-Mérignat in the department of Creuse.
- Henri Rabaute, (26 May 1943 in Limoges - 11 November 2000) was a French cyclist.
- Vincent Perrot, (born 3 August 1965) is a French journalist, radio and television presenter and drag racing driver.
- Nathanaël de Rincquesen, born Nathanael Willecot Rincquesen on 9 March 1972 in Paris, is a French journalist and television presenter.
- Luc Leblanc (1966), French cyclist.
- Richard Dacoury (1959), French basketball player, former international player and emblematic player of the Limoges CSP.
- Laurent Koscielny, born 10 September 1985 in Tulle, French international footballer who played in Limoges FC. He played in the Premier League as a central defender with Arsenal.
- Laetitia Milot (born 5 July 1980), actress, model and French writer.

== See also ==
- Cantons of the Haute-Vienne department
- Communes of the Haute-Vienne department
- Arrondissements of the Haute-Vienne department
