= List of senators of Haute-Vienne =

Location of Haute-Vienne in France

Following is a list of senators of Haute-Vienne, people who have represented the department of Haute-Vienne in the Senate of France.

== Third Republic ==
Senators for Haute-Vienne under the French Third Republic were:

- Pierre Teisserenc de Bort (1876–1892)
- André Dulery de Peyramont (1876–1880)
- Jean-Baptiste Ninard (1880–1886)
- René Pénicaut (1886–1899)
- Jules Donnet (1888–1894)
- Albert Le Play (1892–1900)
- Edmond Teisserenc de Bort (1895–1909)
- Henri Lavertujon (1900–1907)
- André Gotteron (1900–1909)
- Léon Raymond (1907–1920)
- Henri Vacherie (1909–1917)
- Jean Codet (1909–1920)
- Xavier Mazurier (1920–1927)
- René Paul Gustave Trouvé (1920–1927)
- Pierre Codet (1921–1924)
- Léon Betoulle (1924–1940)
- Jean Leclerc (1927–1936)
- Achille Fèvre (1927–1940)
- Eugène Nicolas (1936–1940)

== Fourth Republic ==
Senators for Haute-Vienne under the French Fourth Republic were:

Period	Name	Group	Notes
1946-1948	Jules Fraisseix	Groupe Communiste	
1946-1948	Gaston Charlet	Groupe Socialiste	
1948-1949	Marcel Madoumier	Groupe Socialiste	Died in office 24 March 1949
1948-1949	Gaston Charlet	Groupe Socialiste	
1949-1952	Georges Lamousse	Groupe socialiste	
1949-1952	Gaston Charlet	Groupe Socialiste	
1952-1958	Georges Lamousse	Groupe Socialiste	
1952-1958	Gaston Charlet	Groupe socialiste	
1958-1959	Georges Lamousse	Groupe Socialiste	Reelected in 5th Republic
1958-1959	Jean Le Bail	Groupe Socialiste	

== Fifth Republic ==
Senators for Haute-Vienne under the French Fifth Republic:

Term	Name	Group	Notes
1959–1968	Georges Lamousse	Groupe socialiste	
1959–1968	Gustave Philippon	Groupe socialiste	
1968–1977	Georges Lamousse	Groupe socialiste	
1968–1977	Robert Laucournet	Groupe socialiste	
1977–1986	Louis Longequeue	Groupe socialiste	
1977–1986	Robert Laucournet	Groupe socialiste	
1986–1995	Louis Longequeue	Groupe socialiste	Died 11 August 1990
1986–1995	Jean-Pierre Demerliat	Groupe socialiste	Elected 30 September 1990
1986–1995	Robert Laucournet	Groupe socialiste	
1995–2004	Jean-Pierre Demerliat	Groupe socialiste	
1995–2004	Jean-Claude Peyronnet	Groupe socialiste	
2004–2014	Jean-Pierre Demerliat	Groupe socialiste	
2004–2014	Jean-Claude Peyronnet	Groupe socialiste	
2014–2020	Jean-Marc Gabouty	Groupe du Rassemblement Démocratique et Social Européen	
2014–2020	Marie-Françoise Pérol-Dumont	Groupe socialiste et républicain	

== Sources ==
- Liste des anciens sénateurs de la IIIème République par circonscription (in French), Sénat de France
- Liste des anciens sénateurs de la IVème République par circonscription (in French), Sénat de France
- Liste des anciens sénateurs de la Vème République par circonscription (in French), Sénat de France
- Liste par département – Haute-Vienne (in French), Sénat de France
