= Jouve =

Jouve is a French surname. Notable people with the surname include:

- André Jouve (1929–2019), French conductor and radio producer
- Georges Jouve, French ceramist
- Jacques Jouve (1932–2014), French politician
- Jérémy Jouve (born 1979), French classical guitarist
- Joseph Duval-Jouve (1810–1883), French botanist
- Mireille Jouve (born 1960), French politician
- Nicole Ward Jouve (born 1938), French writer and literary critic
- Paul Jouve (1878–1973), French painter and sculptor
- Pierre Jean Jouve (1887–1976), French author
- Richard Jouve (born 1994), French cross-country skier
- Roger Jouve (born 1949), French footballer
- Sébastien Jouve (born 1982), French canoeist
- Valérie Jouve (born 1964), French photographer and filmmaker
