= Louis Longequeue =

French politician

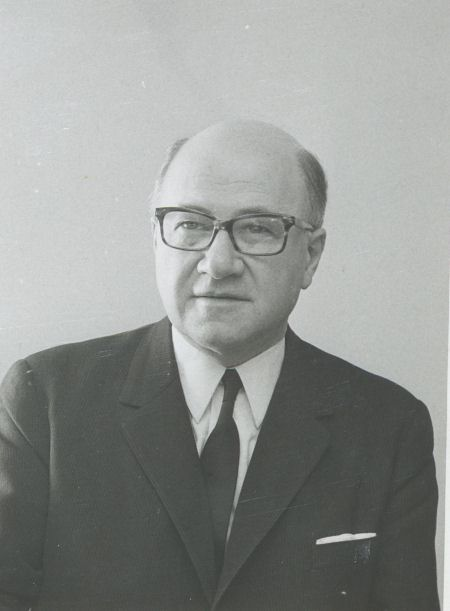
- Longequeue in 1980

Mayor of Limoges
- In office 1956–1990
- Preceded by: Léon Betoulle
- Succeeded by: Alain Rodet

Senator of Haute-Vienne
- In office 1977–1990
- Succeeded by: Jean-Pierre Demerliat

Deputy of the 3rd Circuit of Haute-Vienne
- In office 9 December 1958 – 6 October 1977
- Succeeded by: Jacques Jouve

Personal details
- Born: Louis Jean André Longequeue; November 30, 1914 Saint-Léonard-de-Noblat, France
- Died: August 11, 1990 (aged 75) Limoges, France
- Party: Socialist Party
- Spouse: Marthe Rippe
- Occupation: Politician

Louis Jean André Longequeue (30 November 1914 — 11 August 1990) was a French politician.

He was member of the Socialist Party and served as mayors of Limoges from 1956 to 1990. Louis Longequeue joined the Socialist Youth in 1932. He became Léon Betoulle's eighth assistant in 1947. He was also deputy for Haute-Vienne from 1958 to 1977 and senator from 1977 to 1990 president of the Limousin regional council from 1981 to 1986.

== Biography ==
Louis Longequeue was born in Saint-Léonard-de-Noblat, France on 1914 and died in Limoges, France on 1990 at the age of 75. He is married to Marthe Rippe, and has children's. Louis Longequeue was born into a family of teachers. He was a member of the Medical Committee of the Resistance of Haute-Vienne. He was called up to the army in 1937. He studied pharmacy at the medical school of Limoges, then at the faculty of Paris.

Political offices
Preceded by Léon Betoulle	Mayor of Limoges; 1956 – 1990	Succeeded by Alain Rodet
Preceded by Georges Lamousse	Senator of Haute-Vienne; 1977 – 1990	Succeeded by Jean-Pierre Demerliat
Preceded by	Deputy of the 3rd Circuit of Haute-Vienne; 9 December 1958 – 6 October 1977	Succeeded by Jacques Jouve
