= Departmental Council of Haute-Vienne =

Departmental legislature in France

Departmental Council of Haute-Vienne Conseil départemental de la Haute-Vienne
- Logo of the Council

Leadership
- President: Jean-Claude Leblois, PS

Meeting place
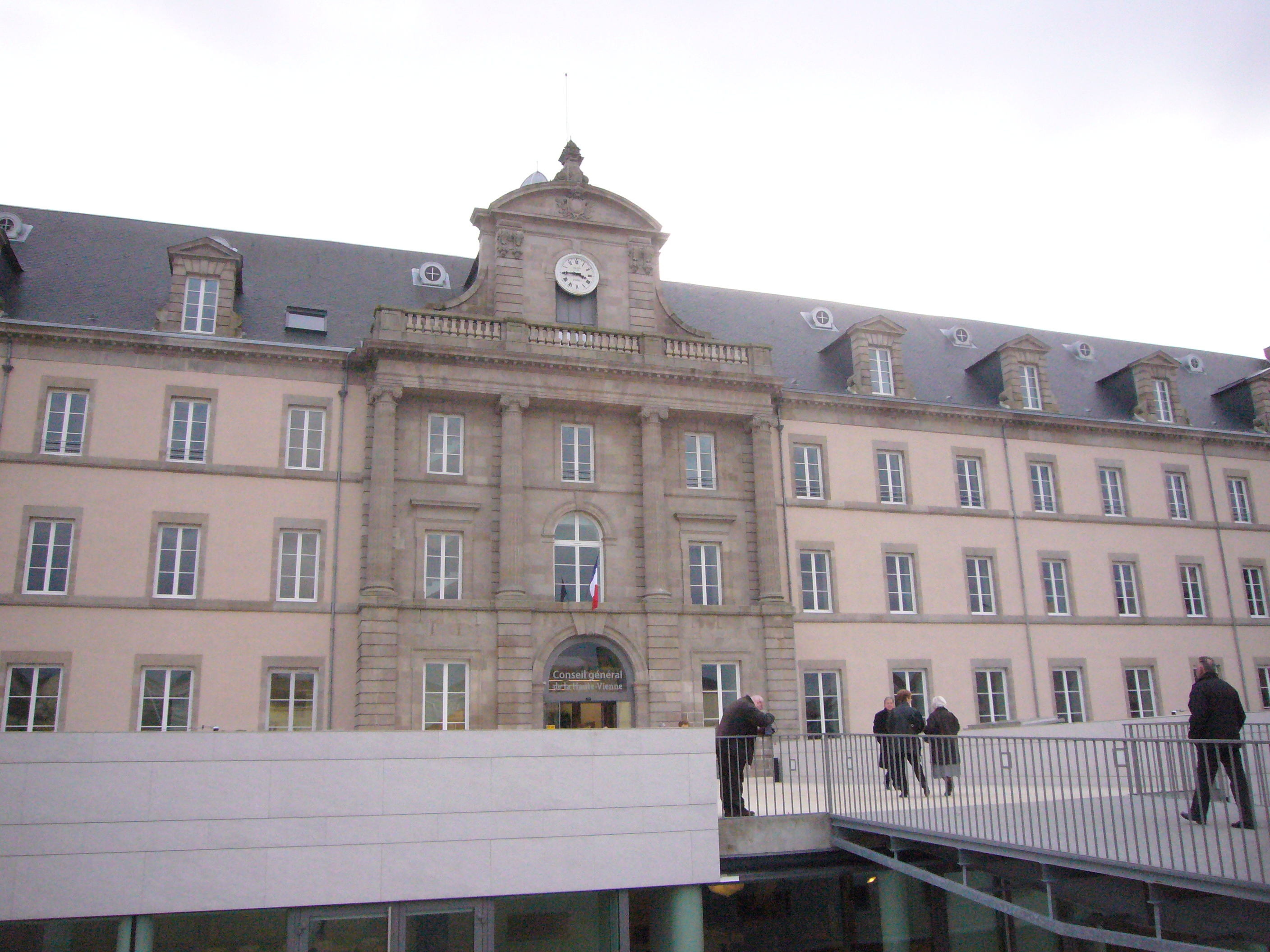
- Caserne de la Visitation, Limoges

Website
- www.haute-vienne.fr/accueil

The Departmental Council of Haute-Vienne (French: Conseil départemental de la Haute-Vienne) is the deliberative assembly of the French department of Haute-Vienne. Its headquarters are in Limoges, in the former Visitation de Limoges in rue François Chénieux.

== Executive ==
=== President ===
The president of the Haute-Vienne departmental council has been Jean-Claude Leblois (PS) since April 2, 2015. He was re-elected on July 1, 2021.

List of successive presidents
Period		Name	Party
1901	1910	Henri Vacherie	PR
1910	1928	Marcel Roux	PR
1928	1929	Xavier Mazurier	PR
1929	1940	Léon Betoulle	SFIO
1945	1946	Adrien Tixier	SFIO
1946	1969	René Regaudie	SFIO
1969	1982	René Regaudie	PS
1982	2004	Jean-Claude Peyronnet	PS
2004	2015	Marie-Françoise Pérol-Dumont	PS
2015	In progress	Jean Claude Leblois	PS

=== Vice-presidents ===
The president of the Departmental Council is assisted by 12 vice-presidents chosen from among the departmental councillors. Each of them has a delegation of authority.

List of vice-presidents of the Haute-Vienne Departmental Council (as of 2021)
Order	Name	Delegation
1st	Annick Morizio	General affairs
2nd	Pierre Allard	Departmental finances
3rd	Sandrine Rotzler	Economic attractiveness and tourism
4th	Stéphane Delautrette	Ecological transition, contractual policies and sustainable investments
5th	Gulsen Yildirim	Children, families and health
6th	Thierry Miguel	Sport and community life
7th	Sylvie Tuyeras	Integration and housing
8th	Fabrice Escure	Culture and citizenship
9th	Monique Plazzi	Support for loss of autonomy and disability
10th	Alain Auzemery	Agriculture and rurality
11th	Anne-Marie Almoster-Rodrigues	Education and youth
12th	Stéphane Destruhaut	Digital infrastructures and mobility

=== Composition ===
The departmental council of Haute-Vienne comprises 42 departmental councilors elected from the 21 cantons of Haute-Vienne.

Political map of the cantons of Haute-Vienne after 2021 departmental elections

Coalition	Acronym	Seats
Majority (34 seats)
Union of the Left	UG	18
Socialist Party	PS	12
Miscellaneous left	DVG	2
Union of the Left and Ecologists	UGE	2
Opposition (8 seats)
Miscellaneous centre	DVC	4
The Republicans	LR	2
Miscellaneous right	DVD	2

=== Budget ===
The departmental council of Haute-Vienne in 2021 had a budget of 458.3 million euros.
