= Alain Rodet =

French politician

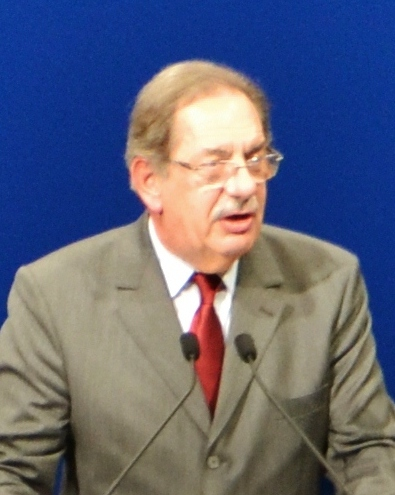
- Rodet in 2012

Mayor of Limoges
- In office 26 August 1990 – 4 April 2014
- Preceded by: Louis Longequeue
- Succeeded by: Emile-Roger Lombertie

Member of the National Assembly for Haute-Vienne's 1st constituency
- In office 20 June 2012 – 20 June 2017
- Preceded by: Monique Boulestin
- Succeeded by: Sophie Beaudouin-Hubière

Personal details
- Born: 4 June 1944 (age 82) Dieulefit, France
- Party: Socialist Party
- Education: Grenoble Institute of Political Studies; Sciences Po

Alain Rodet (born 4 June 1944) was a member of the National Assembly of France. He represented Haute-Vienne's 1st constituency, and was a member of the Socialiste, radical, citoyen et divers gauche. He was Mayor of Limoges in France from 1990 to 2014.
