= Hôtel de Ville, Fontenay-sous-Bois =

Town hall in Fontenay-sous-Bois, France

Hôtel de Ville
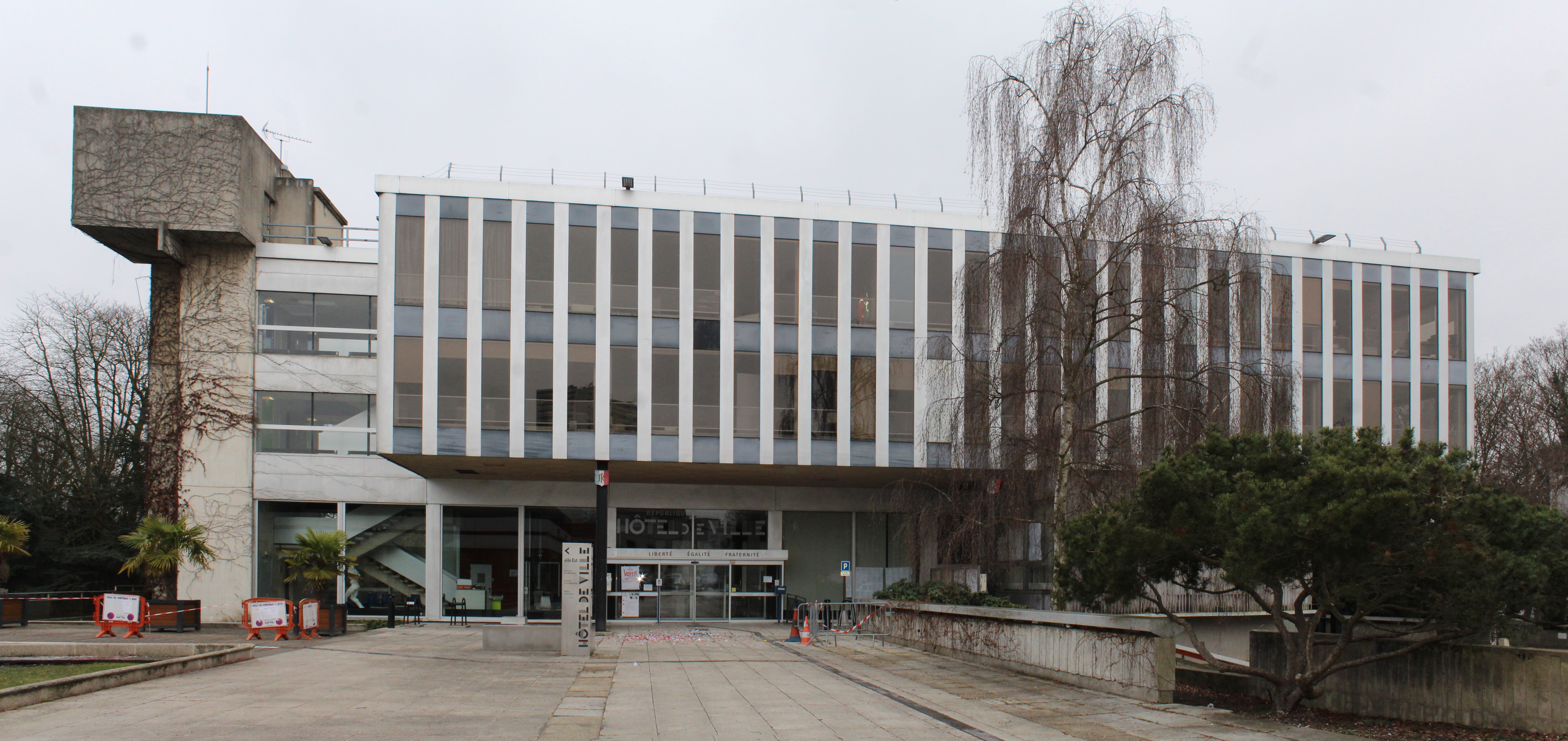
- The main frontage of the Hôtel de Ville in January 2017
- Interactive map of the Hôtel de Ville area

General information
- Type: City hall
- Architectural style: Modern style
- Location: Fontenay-sous-Bois, France
- Coordinates: 48.8489°N 2.4745°E
- Completed: 1973

Design and construction
- Architect: Henri Beauclair

The Hôtel de Ville (French pronunciation: [otɛl də vil], City Hall) is a municipal building in Fontenay-sous-Bois, Val-de-Marne, in the eastern suburbs of Paris, standing on Rue Guérin Leroux.

== History ==
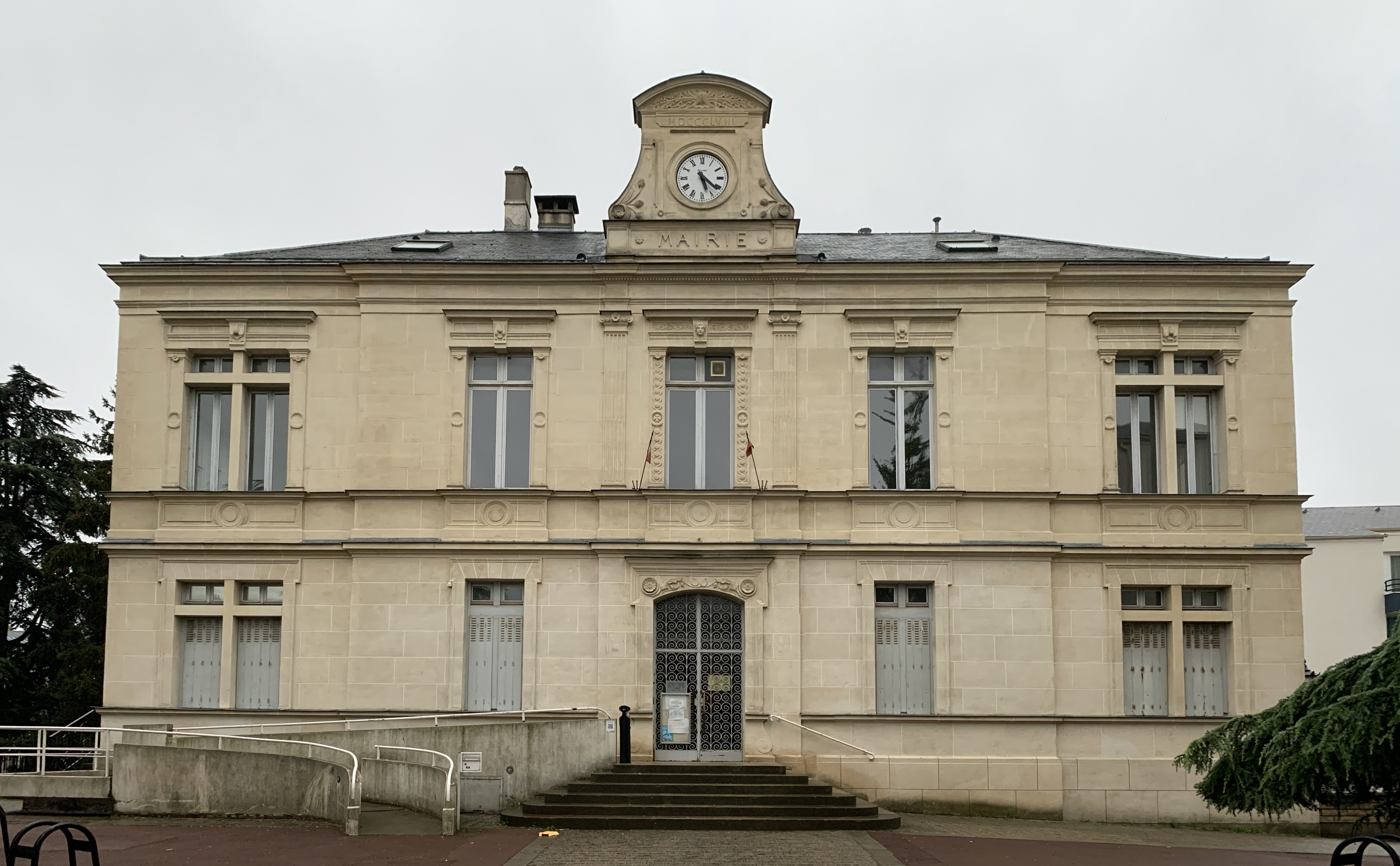
The old town hall

Following the French Revolution, the town council usually met at the house of the mayor at that time. However, in 1858, the town council decided to commission a dedicated town hall. The site selected was on the southwest side of what became known as Rue de l'Ancienne-Mairie. It was designed by Claude Naissant in the neoclassical style, built in ashlar stone and was officially opened in 1859.

The original design involved a symmetrical main frontage of just three bays facing onto Rue de l'Ancienne-Mairie. The central bay featured a segmental headed doorway flanked by pilasters supporting a frieze. On the first floor, there was a casement window with a cornice flanked by composite order pilasters supporting an entablature and a cornice. Above the central bay, there was a clock which was supported by scrolls and surmounted by a segmental pediment. The outer bays were fenestrated in a similar style. The building was enlarged by the creation of additional end bays, slightly recessed from the original structure, in 1931.

Following significant population growth in the post-war era, the council decided to commission a modern town hall. The site they selected had originally been occupied by the old Château de Fontenay-sous-Bois, which had been the seat of Jacques Maquer, the local feudal seigneur, in the 18th century, but had since been abandoned.

The foundation stone for the new building was laid by the mayor, Louis Bayeurte, on 7 March 1971. It was designed by Henri Beauclair in the modern style, built in concrete and glass and was officially opened by the politicians, Charles Hernu, and Georges Marchais on 16 September 1973.

The design of the three-storey building involved a bare concrete stairwell on the left, a glass entrance to the left of centre, and a box type structure, clad in alternating vertical bands of aluminium and glass, enclosing the upper floors and overhanging the pavement. Internally, the principal rooms were the Salle du Conseil (council chamber), the Salles des Mariages (wedding room) and the assembly hall, all of which were double-height and separated from each other by sliding walls.
