= Haute-Vienne's 1st constituency =

Constituency of the National Assembly of France

1st constituency of Haute-Vienne
- inline Constituency of the National Assembly of France

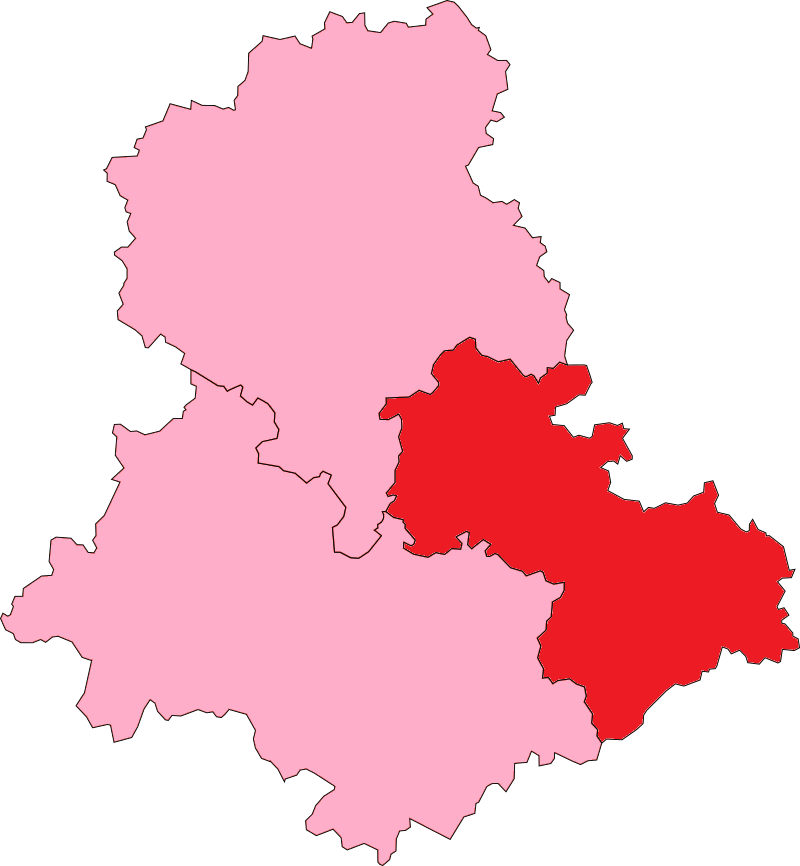
- Haute-Vienne's 1st Constituency shown within Haute-Vienne
- Deputy: Damien Maudet; LFI
- Department: Haute-Vienne
- Cantons: Ambazac, Châteauneuf-la-Forêt, Eymoutiers, Limoges-La-Bastide, Limoges-Carnot, Limoges Centre, Limoges-Cité, Limoges-Grand-Treuil, Limoges-Le-Palais, Limoges-Panazol, Limoges-Vigenal, Saint-Léonard-de-Noblat
- Registered voters: 84743

The 1st constituency of Haute-Vienne (French: Première circonscription de la Haute-Vienne) is a French legislative constituency in the Haute-Vienne département. Like the other 576 French constituencies, it elects one MP using a two round electoral system.

== Description ==
The 1st Constituency of Haute-Vienne covers the south east portion of the Department and includes most of the city of Limoges. Historically the constituency has broadly followed national trends in terms of representation. The 2017 election was notable for a strong performance by La France Insoumise and the absence of either mainstream right or left parties in the run off. Since 1988 no deputy has held the seat for two consecutive terms.

== Assembly Members ==
Election	Member	Party
1988	Robert Savy	PS
1993	Alain Marsaud	RPR
1997	Claude Lanfranca	PS
2002	Alain Marsaud	UMP
2007	Monique Boulestin	PS
2012	Alain Rodet	PS
2017	Sophie Beaudouin-Hubière	LREM
2022	Damien Maudet	LFI

== Election results ==
=== 2024 ===
Candidate	Party	Alliance	First round		Second round	
Candidate	Party	Alliance	Votes	%	Votes	%
Damien Maudet	LFi	NFP	21,271	36.94	24,713	42.20
Camille Dos Santos de Oliveira	RN		18,904	32.83	20,400	34.83
Isabelle Negrier	RE	Ensemble	15,544	26.99	13,453	22.97
Serge Moretti	DLF	DSV	1,066	1.85		
Elisabeth Faucon	LO		803	1.39		
Valid votes			57,588	96.06	58,566	96.70
Blank votes			1,403	2.34	1,239	2.05
Null votes			959	1.60	760	1.25
Turnout			59,950	71.41	60,565	72.13
Abstentions			23,998	28.59	23,398	27.87
Registered voters			83,948		83,963	
Result			LFI HOLD			

=== 2022 ===
Legislative Election 2022: Haute-Vienne's 1st constituency
Party	Candidate	Votes	%	±%
LFI (NUPÉS)	Damien Maudet	14,675	34.54	+0.22
LREM (Ensemble)	Sophie Beaudouin-Hubière	11,907	28.02	-8.50
RN	Christiane Gedoux	7,884	18.55	+7.78
LR (UDC)	Jean Valiere-Vialeix	3,756	8.84	−4.38
REC	Fabienne Marquet	1,756	4.13	N/A
LO	Elisabeth Faucon	880	2.07	N/A
PA	David Provost	867	2.04	N/A
LMR	Stéphanie Tambo	765	1.80	N/A
Turnout		42,490	52.48	−0.34
2nd round result
LFI (NUPÉS)	Damien Maudet	20,710	53.41	+9.01
LREM (Ensemble)	Sophie Beaudouin-Hubière	18,065	46.59	−9.01
Turnout		38,775	51.03	+8.66
LFI gain from LREM				

=== 2017 ===
Legislative Election 2017: Haute-Vienne's 1st constituency
Party	Candidate	Votes	%	±%
LREM	Sophie Beaudouin-Hubière	16,344	36.52	
LFI	Danielle Soury	7,052	15.76	
LR	Sarah Gentil	5,915	13.22	
PS	Laurent Lafaye	5,140	11.49	
FN	Nathalie Gerard	4,822	10.77	
PCF	Francis Dauliac	1,600	3.58	
EELV	Jean-Louis Pages	1,563	3.49	
Others	N/A	2,316		
Turnout		44,752	52.82	
2nd round result
LREM	Sophie Beaudouin-Hubière	19,965	55.60	
LFI	Danielle Soury	15,943	44.40	
Turnout		35,908	42.37	
LREM gain from PS				

=== 2012 ===
Legislative Election 2012: Haute-Vienne's 1st constituency
Party	Candidate	Votes	%	±%
PS	Alain Rodet	24,747	49.31	
UMP	Florence Prévot-Sola	8,637	17.21	
FN	Nicole Serre	6,496	12.94	
FG	Claude Toulet	5,635	11.23	
EELV	Didier Tescher	2,031	4.05	
Others	N/A	1,383		
Turnout		50,183	59.28	
2nd round result
PS	Alain Rodet	29,943	69.04	
UMP	Florence Prévot-Sola	13,427	30.96	
Turnout		43,370	51.24	
PS hold				

=== 2007 ===
Legislative Election 2007: Haute-Vienne's 1st constituency
Party	Candidate	Votes	%	±%
UMP	Alain Marsaud	14,116	40.38	
PS	Monique Boulestin	12,442	35.59	
MoDem	Jean-Jacques Belezy	2,818	8.06	
LV	Nicolas Berthon	1,269	3.63	
Far left	Daniel Clerembaux	1,244	3.56	
DVG	Patrick Charles	1,175	3.36	
FN	Magalie Servant	911	2.61	
Others	N/A	983		
Turnout		35,780	65.92	
2nd round result
PS	Monique Boulestin	18,218	53.09	
UMP	Alain Marsaud	16,095	46.91	
Turnout		35,497	65.40	
PS gain from UMP				

=== 2002 ===
Legislative Election 2002: Haute-Vienne's 1st constituency
Party	Candidate	Votes	%	±%
PS	Pierre-Claude Lafranca	11,737	32.59	
UMP	Alain Marsaud	10,340	28.72	
UDF	Jean-Marc Gabouty	6,009	16.69	
FN	Michelle Devert	1,602	4.45	
PCF	Claude Toulet	1,192	3.31	
LV	Laurence Guedet	1,092	3.03	
LCR	Daniel Clerembaux	953	2.65	
PR	Gilbert Chapeaublanc	937	2.60	
Others	N/A	2,147		
Turnout		37,031	70.99	
2nd round result
UMP	Alain Marsaud	17,082	51.25	
PS	Pierre-Claude Lafranca	16,246	48.75	
Turnout		35,170	67.42	
UMP gain from PS				

=== 1997 ===
Legislative Election 1997: Haute-Vienne's 1st constituency
Party	Candidate	Votes	%	±%
RPR	Alain Marsaud	12,477	35.69	
PS	Pierre-Claude Lafranca	10,163	29.07	
MDC	Gilbert Chapeaublanc	4,031	11.53	
FN	Antoine Orabona	2,832	8.10	
LV	Aline Biardaud	1,394	3.99	
LO	Catherine Dumon	1,187	3.40	
DVD	Bernard Dufour	918	2.63	
Others	N/A	1,953		
Turnout		37,244	70.91	
2nd round result
PS	Pierre-Claude Lafranca	19,473	52.19	
RPR	Alain Marsaud	17,838	47.81	
Turnout		39,529	75.26	
PS gain from RPR				
