= Fontenay-sous-Bois =

- Commune
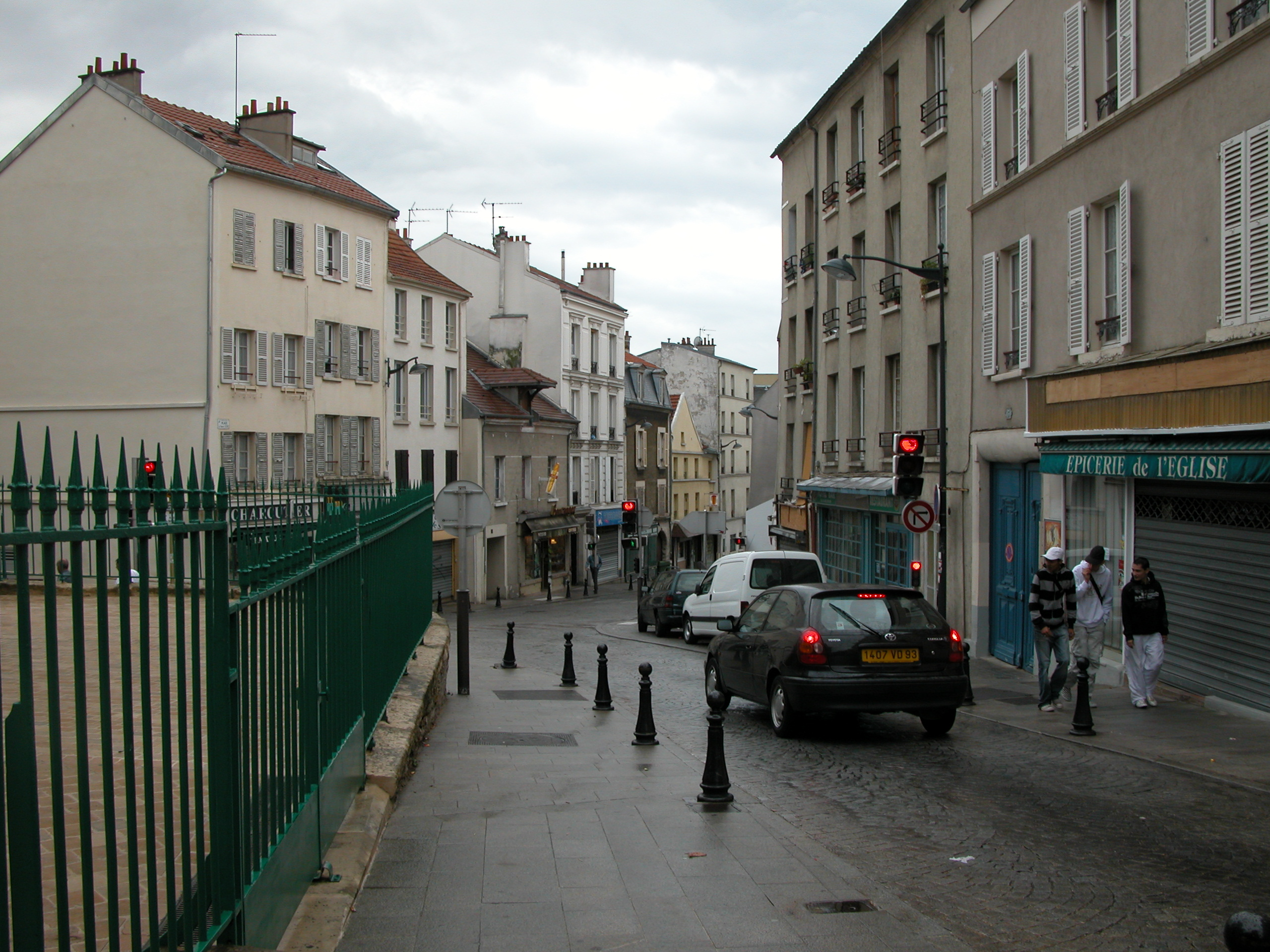
- A road in the centre of Fontenay-sous-Bois

- Coat of arms

- Location (in red) within Paris inner suburbs
- Location of Fontenay-sous-Bois
- Location within France Location within Île-de-France (region)
- Coordinates: 48°51′06″N 2°28′38″E
- Country: France
- Region: Île-de-France
- Department: Val-de-Marne
- Arrondissement: Nogent-sur-Marne
- Canton: Fontenay-sous-Bois
- Intercommunality: Grand Paris

Government
  - Mayor (2026–32): Jean-Philippe Gautrais
- Area^{1}: 5.58 km^{2} (2.15 sq mi)
- Highest elevation: 111 m (364 ft)
- Lowest elevation: 44 m (144 ft)
- Population (2023): 53,757
  - Density: 9,630/km^{2} (25,000/sq mi)
- Time zone: UTC+01:00 (CET)
  - Summer (DST): UTC+02:00 (CEST)
- INSEE/Postal code: 94033 /94120
- ^{1} French Land Register data, which excludes lakes, ponds, glaciers > 1 km^{2} (0.386 sq mi or 247 acres) and river estuaries.

Fontenay-sous-Bois (French pronunciation: [fɔ̃tnɛ su bwɑ]) is a commune in the eastern suburbs of Paris, France. It is located 9.3 km (5.8 mi) from the center of Paris.

== Name ==
The name Fontenay was recorded in the Middle Ages as Fontanetum, meaning "the springs", from Medieval Latin fontana ("natural spring").

The commune was known alternatively as Fontenay-les-Bois (meaning "Fontenay by the woods"), Fontenay-sur-le-Bois (meaning "Fontenay over the wood"), or Fontenay-sous-Bois (meaning "Fontenay under wood"), but eventually in the early 19th century the latter name of Fontenay-sous-Bois became the only name. The wood referred to in the name of the commune is the Bois de Vincennes.

== History ==
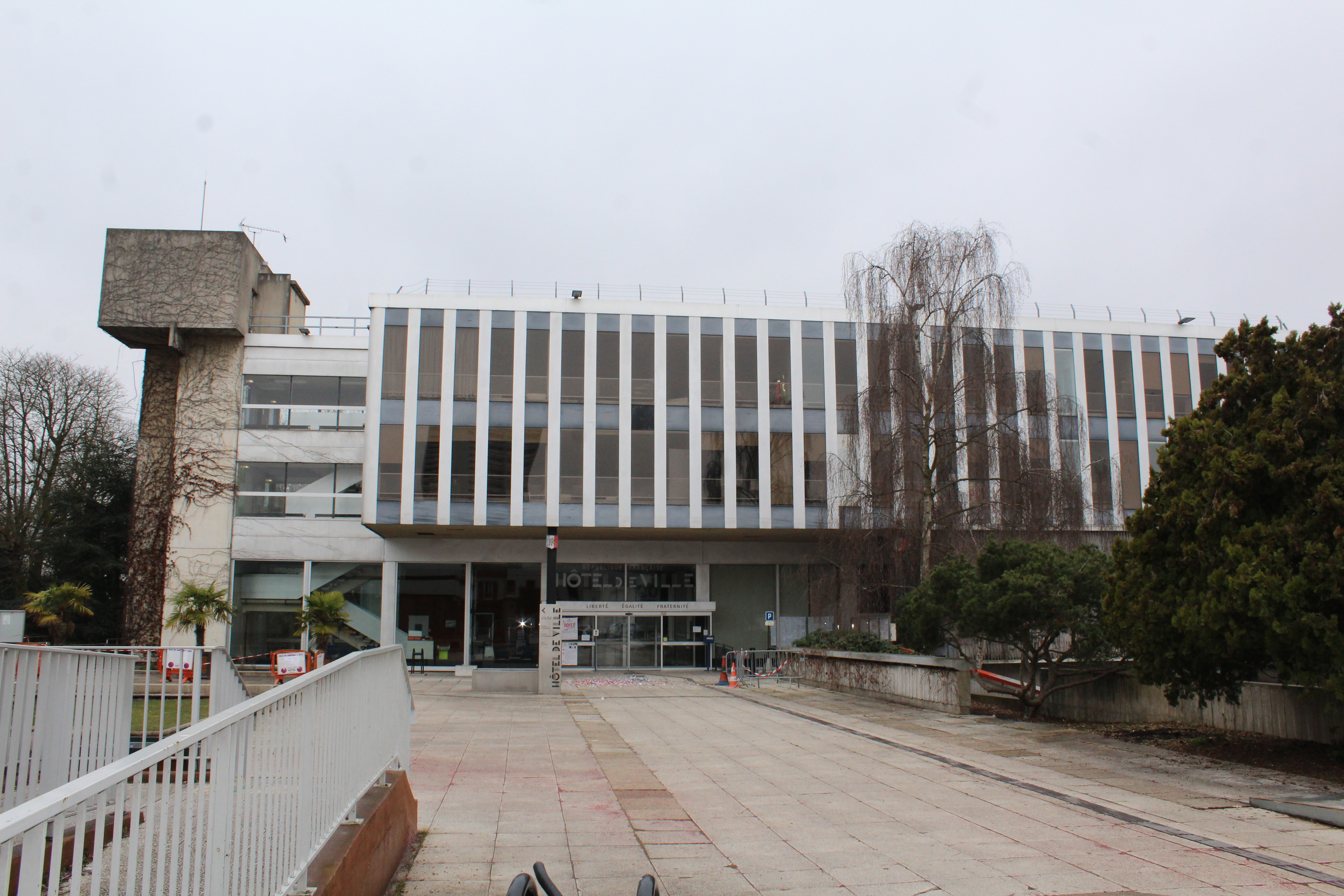
The Hôtel de Ville

In 1929, the commune of Fontenay-sous-Bois lost more than a third of its territory when the city of Paris annexed the Bois de Vincennes, a large part of which belonged to Fontenay-sous-Bois.

Due to the large number of natural springs in the area, fountains were established. These included (i) The Carreaux fountain which was erected at the corner of rue André-Laurent and avenue de la République in 1793 (ii) The Rosettes fountain which was originally located at avenue de la République and rue du Ruisseau but was moved a number of times and (iii) The fountain of the Old Place d'Armes (place du Général-Leclerc) removed around 1862 and reinstalled in 2002 during the redevelopment of the square.

The Hôtel de Ville was completed in 1973.

== Transport ==
Fontenay-sous-Bois is served by Fontenay-sous-Bois station on Paris RER line A.

It is also served by Val de Fontenay station, which is an interchange station on Paris RER line A and RER line E.

== Education ==
The commune has eleven preschools, eleven elementary schools, one junior high school, two CES junior high schools, one senior high school/sixth-form college, and one LEP. Collège Victor Duruy and Lycée Pablo Picasso are the main secondary schools.

== Demographics ==
Historical population

Year	Pop.	±% p.a.
1793	1,700	—
1800	1,478	−1.98%
1806	1,230	−3.01%
1821	1,262	+0.17%
1831	1,385	+0.93%
1836	1,524	+1.93%
1841	1,646	+1.55%
1846	1,783	+1.61%
1851	1,662	−1.40%
1856	1,760	+1.15%
1861	2,953	+10.90%
1866	3,092	+0.92%
1872	5,378	+9.66%
1876	4,445	−4.65%
1881	4,365	−0.36%
1886	5,839	+5.99%
1891	5,836	−0.01%
1896	7,220	+4.35%
1901	9,320	+5.24%

Year	Pop.	±% p.a.
1906	11,391	+4.09%
1911	15,192	+5.93%
1921	18,129	+1.78%
1926	23,531	+5.35%
1931	30,036	+5.00%
1936	31,546	+0.99%
1946	30,860	−0.22%
1954	36,739	+2.20%
1962	37,484	+0.25%
1968	38,962	+0.65%
1975	46,475	+2.55%
1982	52,627	+1.79%
1990	51,868	−0.18%
1999	50,921	−0.20%
2007	52,143	+0.30%
2012	52,998	+0.33%
2017	52,939	−0.02%
2023	53,757	+0.26%

Source: EHESS and INSEE (1968-2023)

=== Immigration ===
Place of birth of residents of Fontenay-sous-Bois in 1999
Born in metropolitan France	Born outside metropolitan France			
80.0%	20.0%			
80.0%	Born in overseas France	Born in foreign countries with French citizenship at birth^{1}	EU-15 immigrants^{2}	Non-EU-15 immigrants
80.0%	2.2%	3.3%	4.5%	10.0%
^{1} This group is made up largely of former French settlers, such as pieds-noirs in Northwest Africa, followed by former colonial citizens who had French citizenship at birth (such as was often the case for the native elite in French colonies), as well as to a lesser extent foreign-born children of French expatriates. A foreign country is understood as a country not part of France in 1999, so a person born for example in 1950 in Algeria, when Algeria was an integral part of France, is nonetheless listed as a person born in a foreign country in French statistics.^{2} An immigrant is a person born in a foreign country not having French citizenship at birth. An immigrant may have acquired French citizenship since moving to France, but is still considered an immigrant in French statistics. On the other hand, persons born in France with foreign citizenship (the children of immigrants) are not listed as immigrants.

== Personalities ==
- Claude Le Péron, bass guitarist
- Noe Pamarot, footballer
- Blaise Matuidi, footballer
- Georges Jouve, ceramist
- Gambi, rapper
- Stanislav Tyshchenko, prominent steel construction engineer
- Luis Vassy, civil servant, diplomat, and director of Sciences Po
- Jean-François Voguet, mayor from 2001 to 2016

== Interesting facts ==
In 2015 a street in Brovary, Ukraine was named after its sister city Fontenay-sous-Bois.

== Views ==
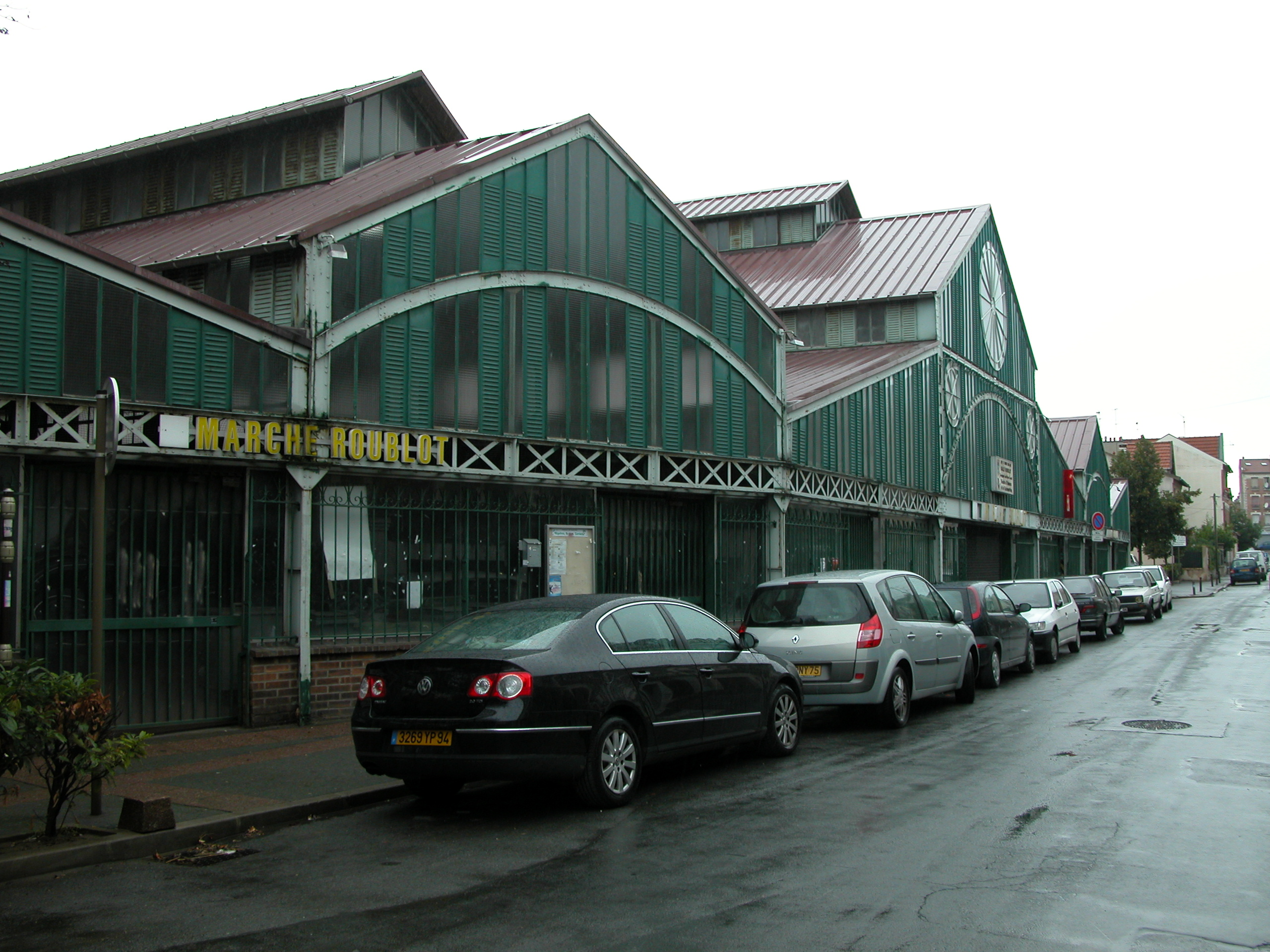
Roublot Market

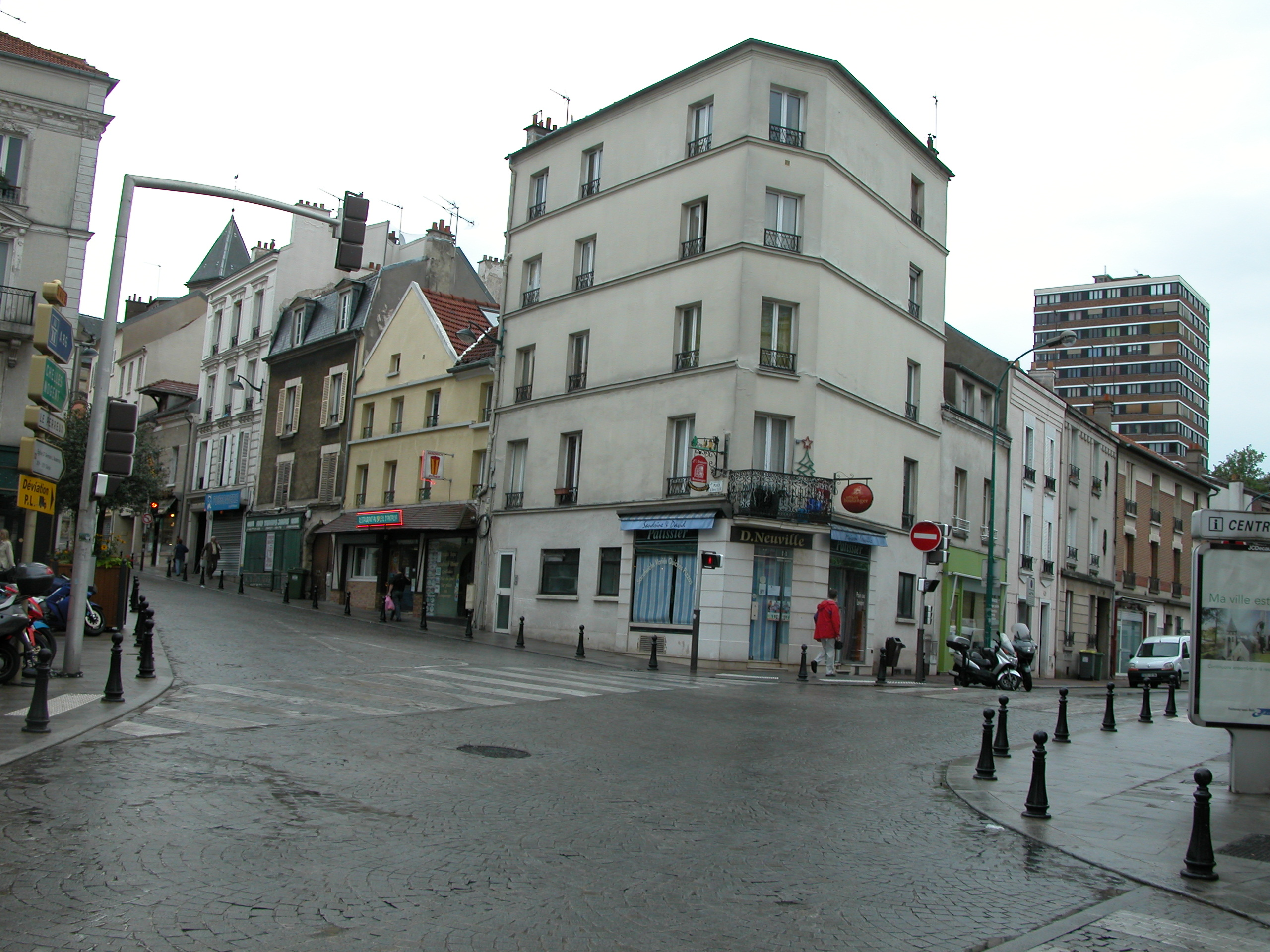
Place Général Leclerc

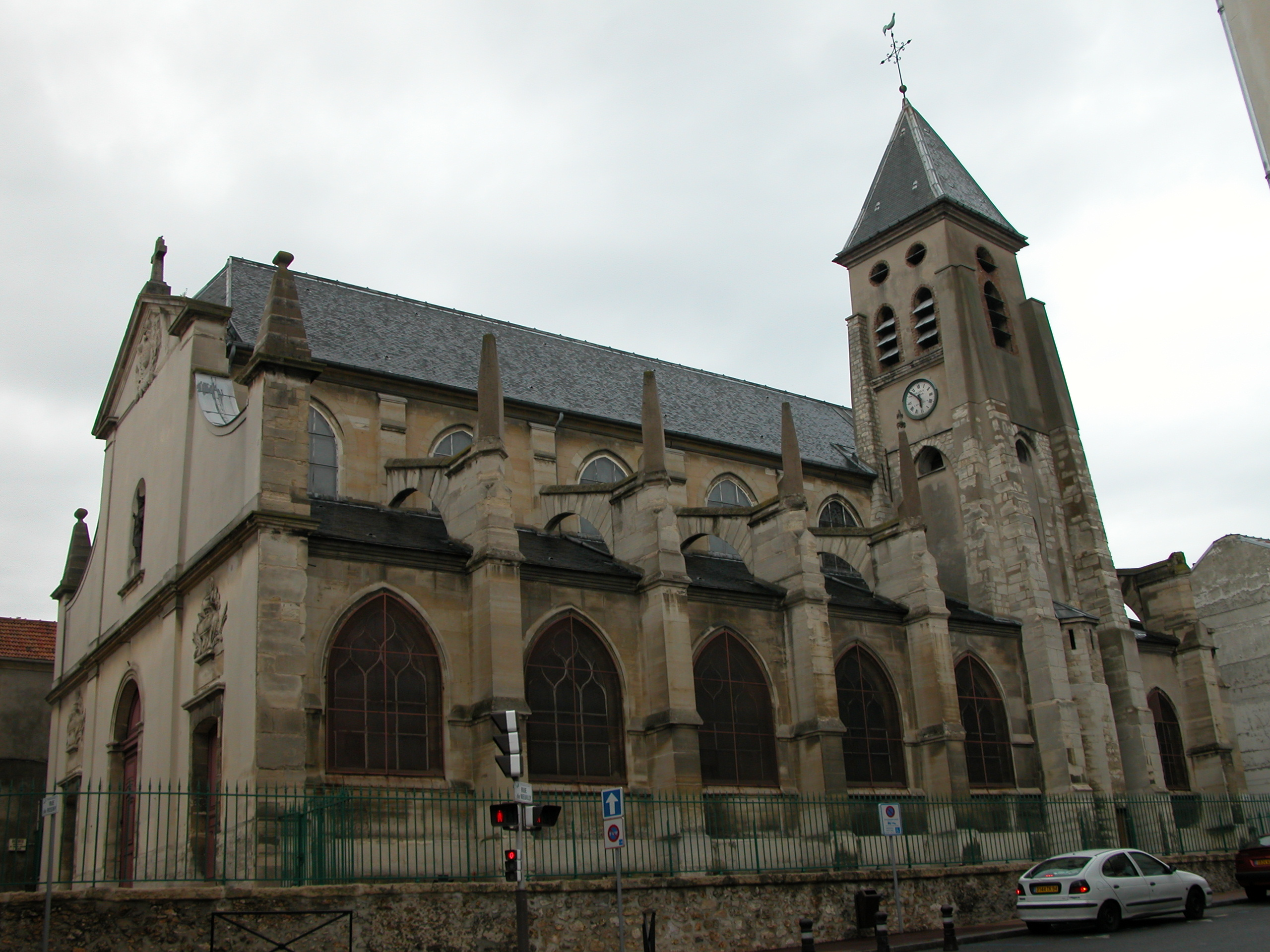
Church of St Germain l'Auxerrois

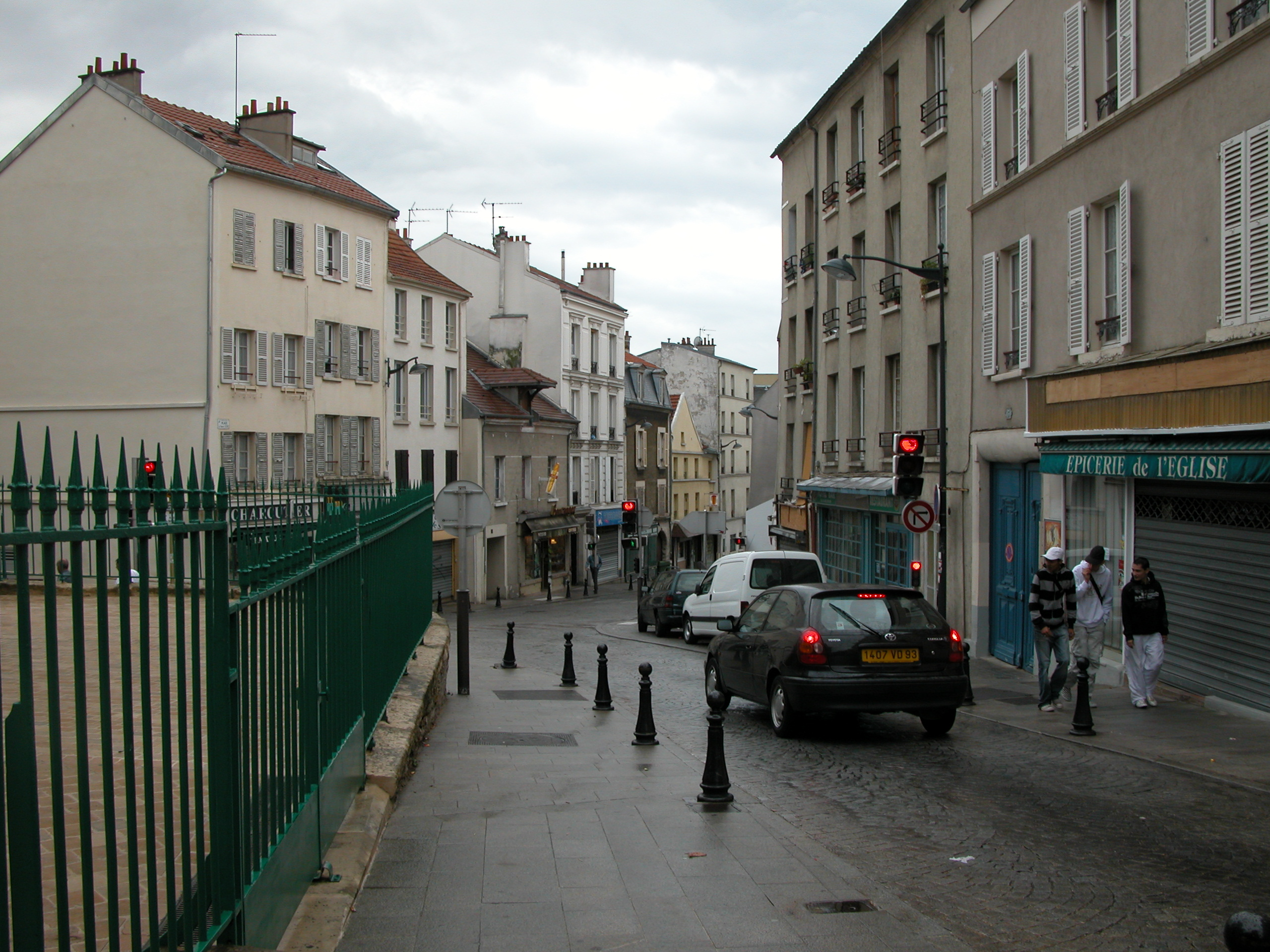
a street in Fontenay-sous-Bois

== See also ==
- Communes of the Val-de-Marne department
