= Damien Maudet =

French politician

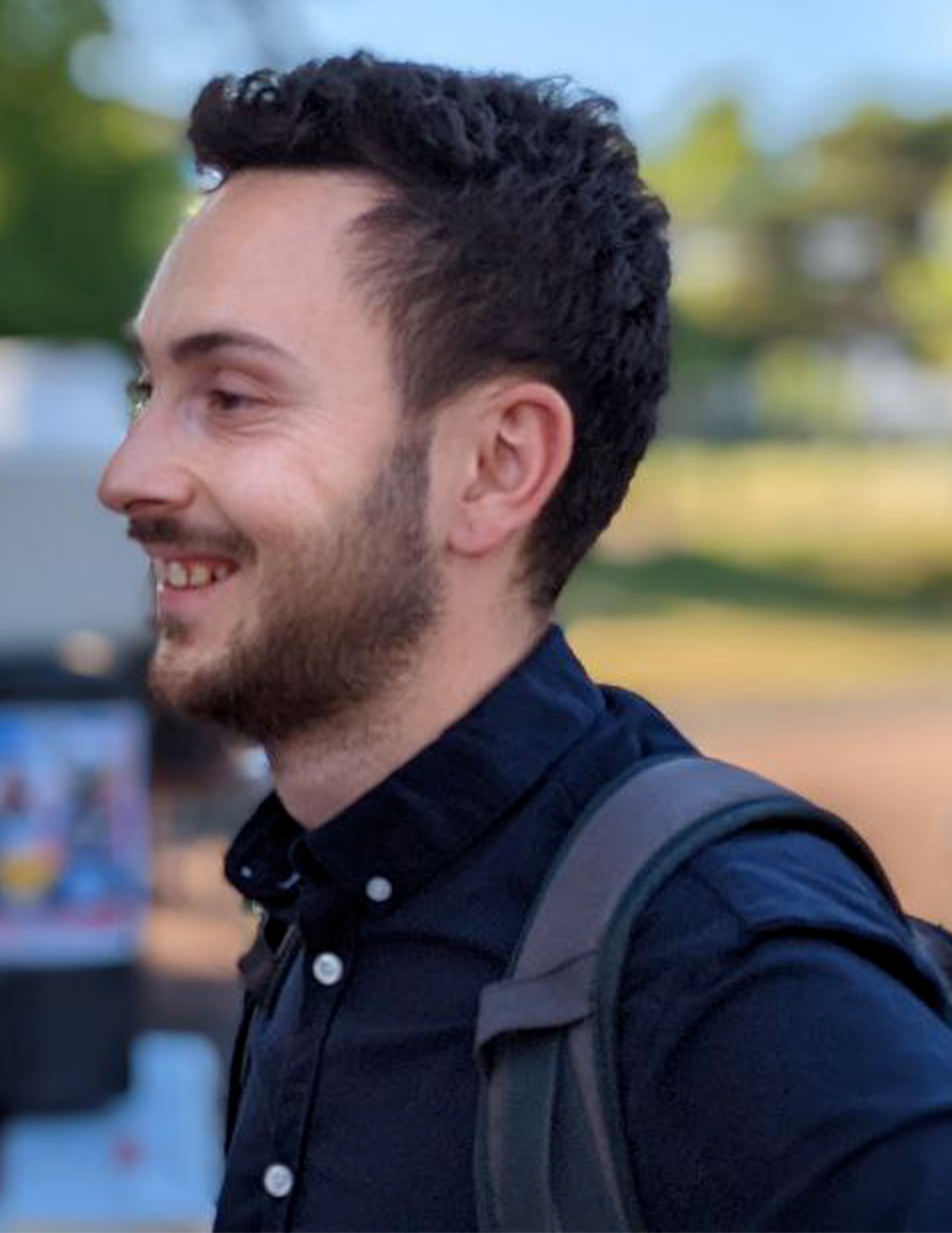

Member of the National Assembly for Haute-Vienne's 1st constituency
- Incumbent
- Assumed office 22 June 2022
- Preceded by: Sophie Beaudouin-Hubière

Personal details
- Born: 14 November 1996 (age 29) Brive-la-Gaillarde, France
- Party: La France Insoumise
- Occupation: politician

Damien Maudet (born 14 November 1996) is a French politician from La France Insoumise. He was elected to the National Assembly in Haute-Vienne's 1st constituency in the 2022 French legislative election.

== See also ==
- List of deputies of the 16th National Assembly of France
