= Adrien Tixier =

French politician and diplomat

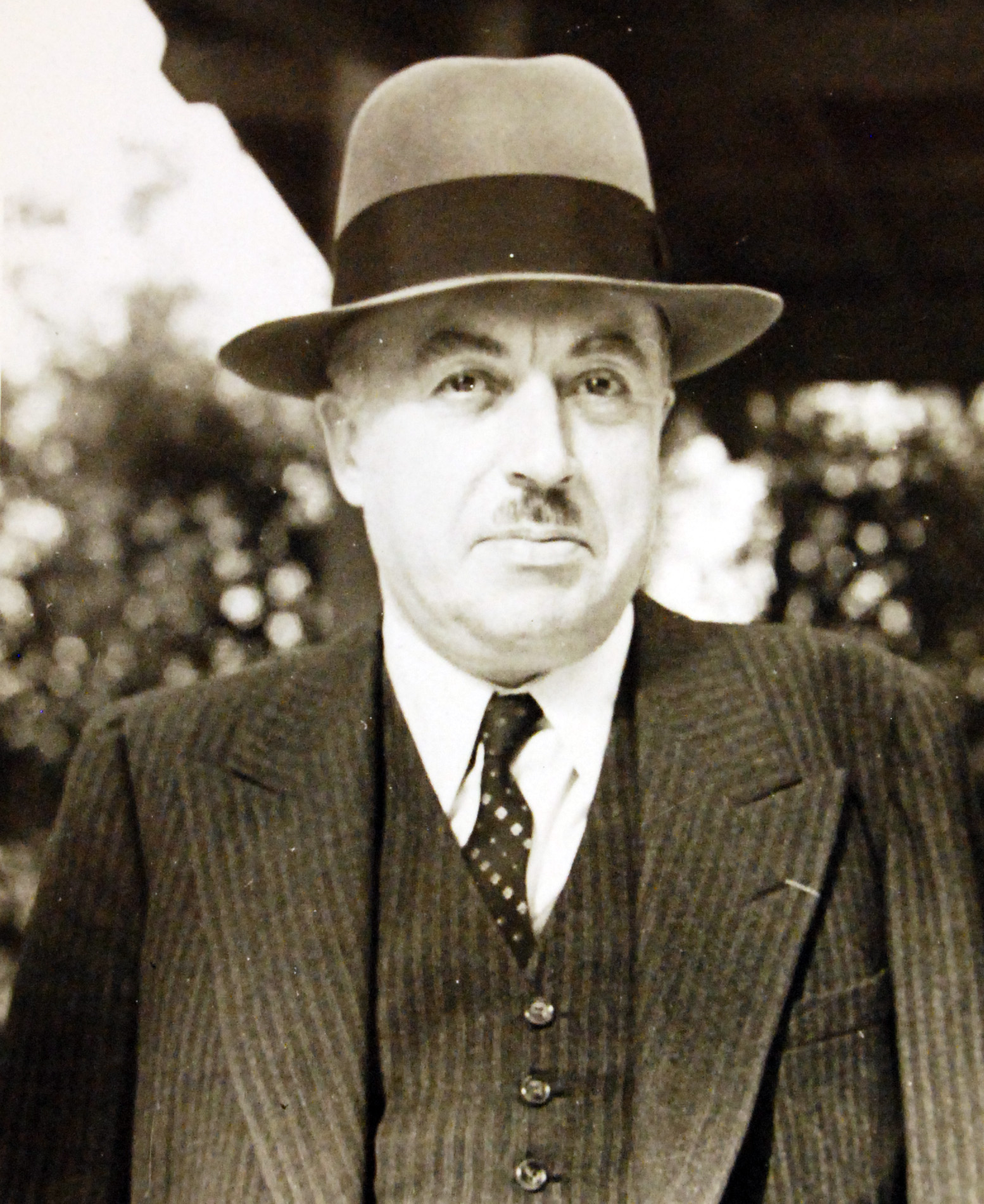
Commissioner of Social Affairs, Adrien Tixier, possibly November 1944.

Adrien Tixier (French pronunciation: [adʁijɛ̃ tiksje]; 31 January 1893 in Folles (Haute-Vienne) – 18 February 1946 in Paris) was a French politician and diplomat who was the Free French ambassador to the United States.

== Career ==
He was the son of Pierre-Edouard Tixier, a blacksmith, and Marie-Françoise Derosier. Destined for a career in education, he studied at the école normale (teachers' college) at Châteauroux and became a teacher of technical subjects. In August 1914, he was enlisted as a reserve officer and served in the First World War. Shortly after being called up, he was wounded in the Ardennes and underwent the amputation of his left arm. He returned to his teaching career in August 1915 and became a senior teacher at the École supérieure professionnelle in the town of Albi.

Active in the Socialist Party, he met Albert Thomas and held from 1920 various offices within the International Labour Office in Geneva, including that of CEO in 1936.

On 20 June 1940, with Professor Edgard Milhaud, and Jean-Amédée Weber, he sent a telegram to Marshal Pétain in protest of the request for an armistice and asked for the continuation of the war alongside the British.

Using with false papers, he sailed for the United States, via Spain and Portugal, as representative of the International Labour Office. He joined General de Gaulle, who charged him in November 1941 of representing the Free France in Washington, where he was appreciated by the Franklin Roosevelt administration. He served in the French Committee of National Liberation of Algeria the position of Commissioner of Labor and Social Welfare from 7 June 1943 to 9 November 1943 and Social Affairs from 9 November 1943 to 9 September 1944. He became the first Minister of Social Affairs. He was appointed interior minister in September 1944 in the Provisional Government of France, led by General de Gaulle, and held the post until January 1946. His task was to restore the republican legality in the disorganised France.

He was a co-signer of the Ordinance of 4 October 1945, which established Social Security. He founded the Department of the Interior, the Directorate of Territorial Surveillance (DST) and the Republican Security Companies (CRS).

He supported de Gaulle, along with Robert Lacoste, the Minister of Production, during his visit to Oradour-sur-Glane on 5 March 1945.

He was then elected in September 1945, to the General Council from Bessines-sur-Gartempe, and in October 1945, he became a socialist member of the Haute-Vienne in the First National Constituent Assembly. He chaired the General Council of Haute-Vienne.

He was buried in Folles.
