= Sophie Beaudouin-Hubière =

French politician

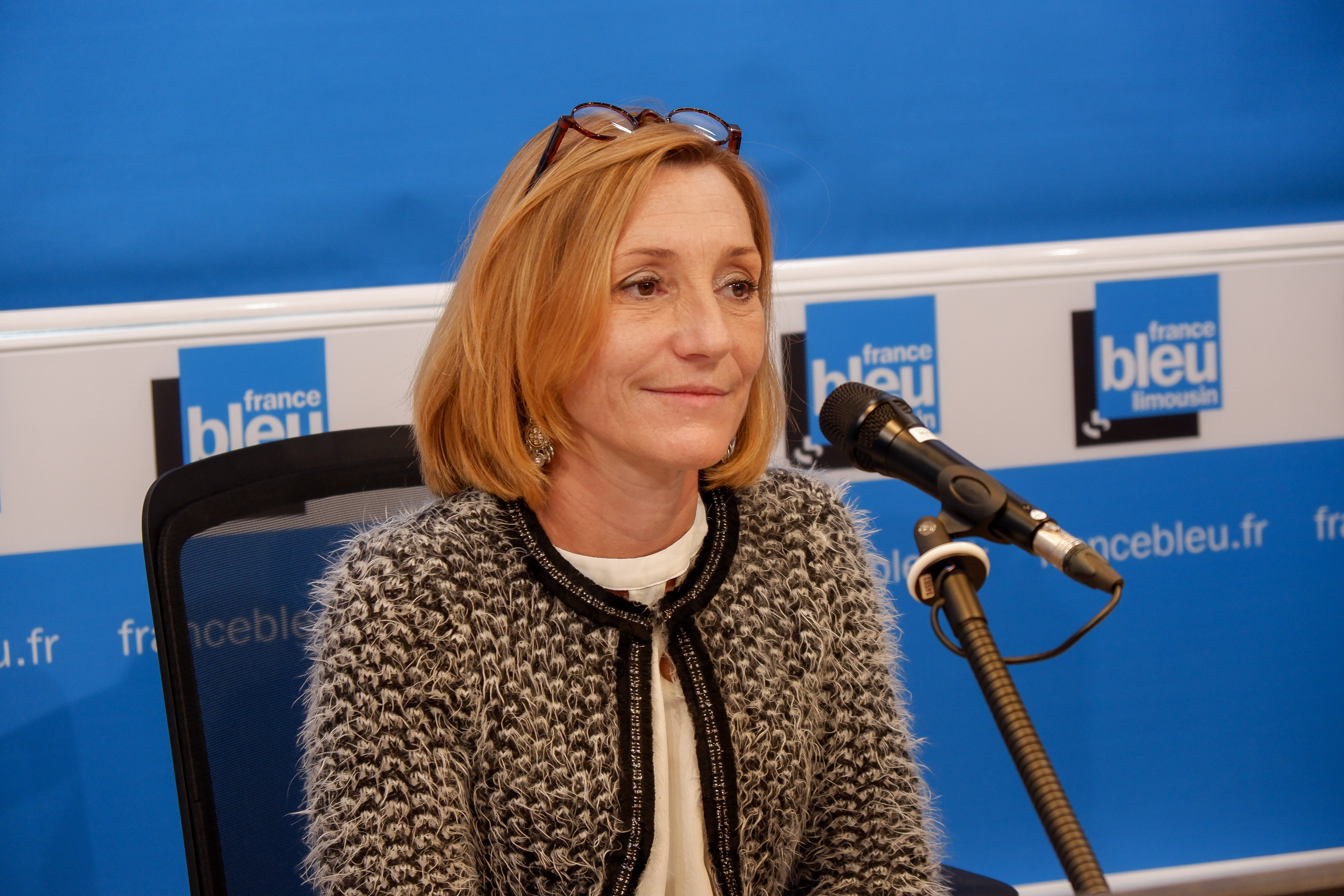

Member of the National Assembly for Haute-Vienne's 1st constituency
- In office 21 June 2017 – 21 June 2022
- Preceded by: Alain Rodet
- Succeeded by: Damien Maudet

Personal details
- Born: 20 November 1972 (age 53) Toulouse, France
- Party: LREM
- Occupation: politician

Sophie Beaudouin-Hubière (born 20 November 1972) is a French politician of La République En Marche! (LREM) who was member of the French National Assembly from 2017 to 2022, representing Haute-Vienne's 1st constituency.

== Career ==
Beaudouin-Hubière worked in HR before running for office. In parliament, Beaudouin-Hubière served on the Committee on Economic Affairs. Since 2020, she has been part of her parliamentary group's leadership under chair Christophe Castaner.

In July 2019, Beaudouin-Hubière voted in favor of the French ratification of the European Union’s Comprehensive Economic and Trade Agreement (CETA) with Canada.

She lost her seat in the second round of the 2022 French legislative election to Damien Maudet from La France Insoumise.

== See also ==
- 2017 French legislative election
