= Jean-François Voguet =

French politician (1949–2021)

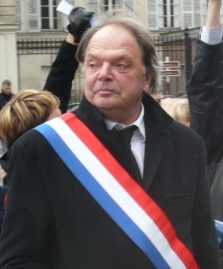
- Voguet in 2008

Mayor of Fontenay-sous-Bois
- In office 18 March 2001 – 22 May 2016
- Preceded by: Louis Bayeurte
- Succeeded by: Jean-Philippe Gautrais

Personal details
- Born: 8 August 1949 Paris, France
- Died: 2 February 2021 (aged 71) Saint-Mandé, France
- Cause of death: COVID-19
- Party: French Communist Party

Jean-François Voguet (French pronunciation: [ʒɑ̃ fʁɑ̃swa vɔɡɛ]; 8 August 1949 – 2 February 2021) was a French politician. He was a member of the Senate of France from 2004–2011, representing the Val-de-Marne department. He was also a member of the Communist, Republican, and Citizen Group.

Voguet died from COVID-19 during the COVID-19 pandemic in France.

== Bibliography ==
- Page on the Senate website
