= Antignac, Cantal =

Commune in Auvergne-Rhône-Alpes, France

Antignac
- Commune
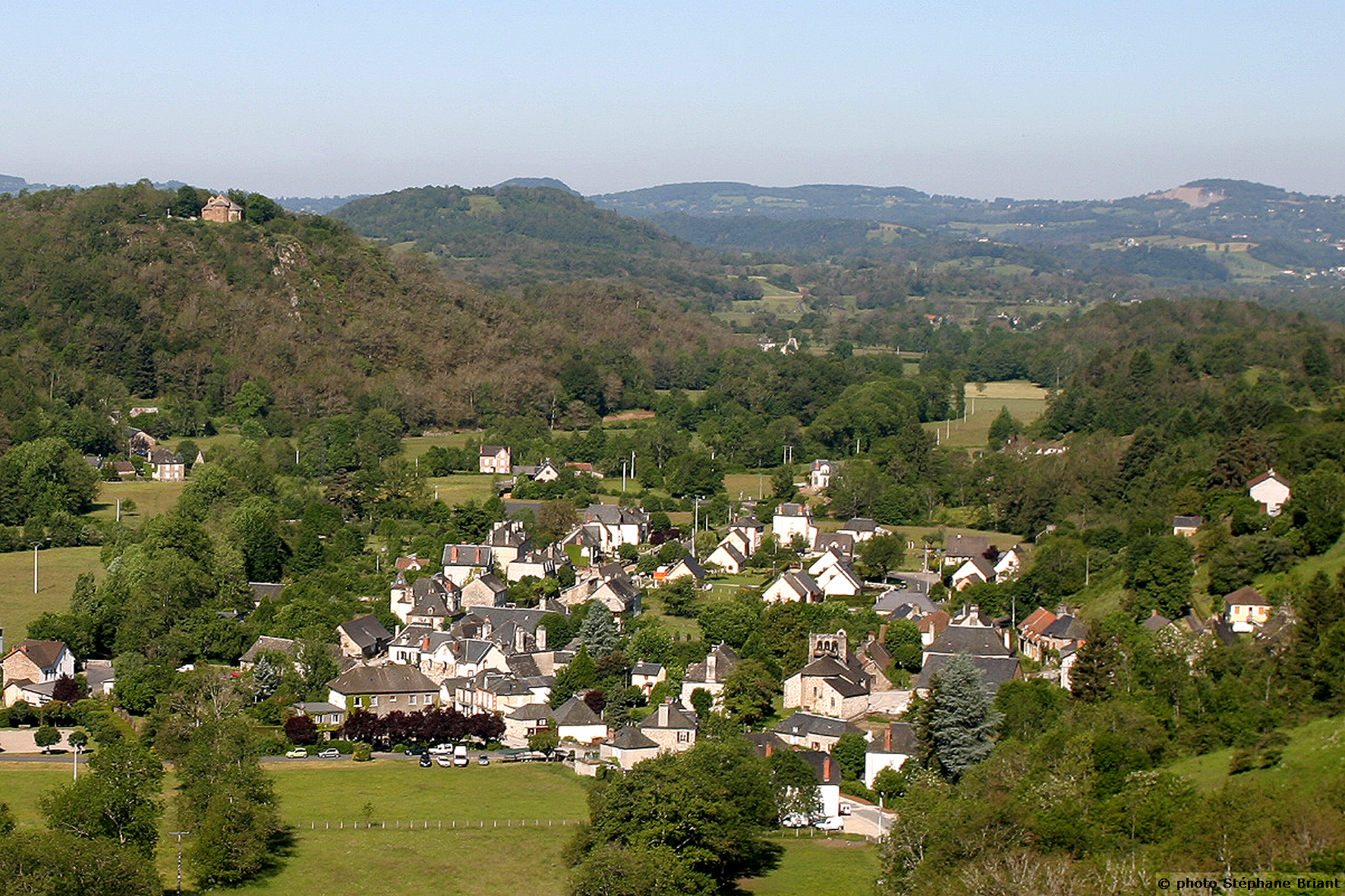
- Antignac village
- Location of Antignac
- Location within France Location within Auvergne-Rhône-Alpes
- Coordinates: 45°20′35″N 2°32′46″E
- Country: France
- Region: Auvergne-Rhône-Alpes
- Department: Cantal
- Arrondissement: Mauriac
- Canton: Ydes
- Intercommunality: Sumène Artense

Government
  - Mayor (2020–2026): Stéphane Briant
- Area^{1}: 16.02 km^{2} (6.19 sq mi)
- Elevation: 495 m (1,624 ft)
- Highest elevation: 928 m (3,045 ft)
- Lowest elevation: 468 m (1,535 ft)
- Population (2023): 284
  - Density: 17.7/km^{2} (45.9/sq mi)
- Time zone: UTC+01:00 (CET)
  - Summer (DST): UTC+02:00 (CEST)
- INSEE/Postal code: 15008 /15240
- ^{1} French Land Register data, which excludes lakes, ponds, glaciers > 1 km^{2} (0.386 sq mi or 247 acres) and river estuaries.

Antignac (French pronunciation: [ɑ̃tiɲak]; Occitan: Antinhac) is a commune in the Cantal department in the Auvergne region of south-central France.

== Geography ==
Antignac lies in the valley of the Sumène some 80 km south-west of Clermont-Ferrand and 10 km north-west of Riom-ès-Montagnes in the Canton of Saignes. Access to the commune is by road D3 from Riom-ès-Montagnes in the south-east continuing west to join the D922.

Antignac is the main village in the commune which includes 25 other hamlets and localities:

- Le Beix
- Bellot
- La Bouboulie
- La Broconie
- Les Buges Blanches
- La Cavarache
- Le Cellier
- Le Chambon
- Le Châtelet
- La Croix de Soleilhadoux
- Drulh
- Fouillade
- Fourgoux
- La Ganette
- Lugue
- Masternat
- Saleix
- Salsignac
- Sauronnet
- La Seppe
- Tampagniergues
- Urlande
- La Valette
- Vignon
- Vignonnet

The river Rhue forms all of the commune's northern border.

=== Neighbouring communes and villages ===
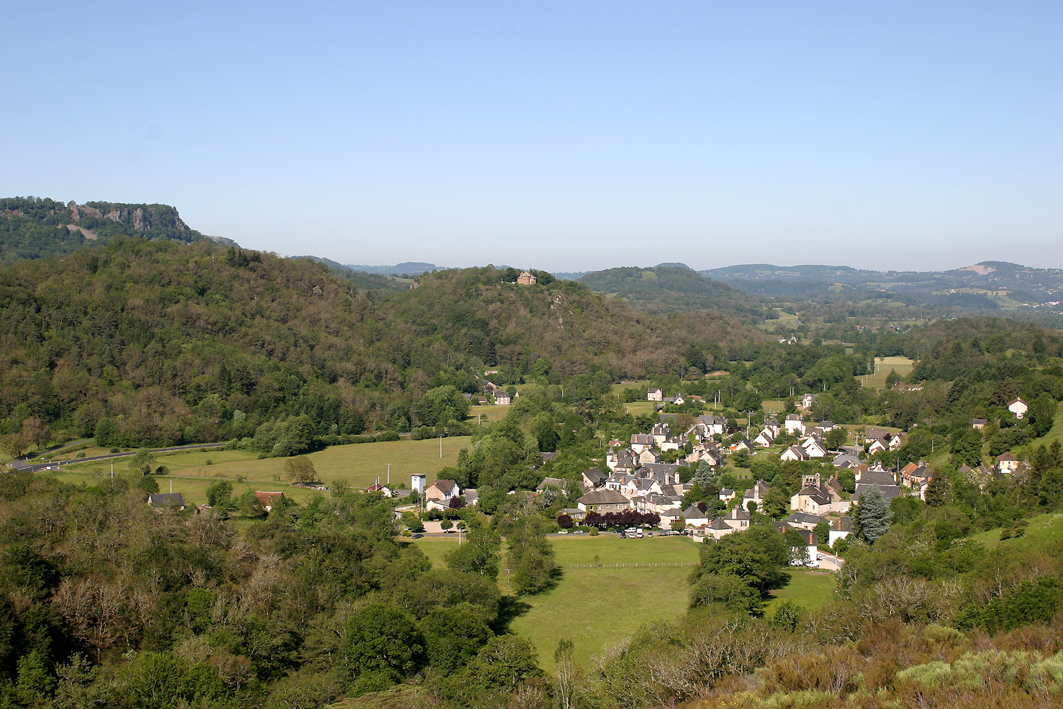
Antignac village in spring

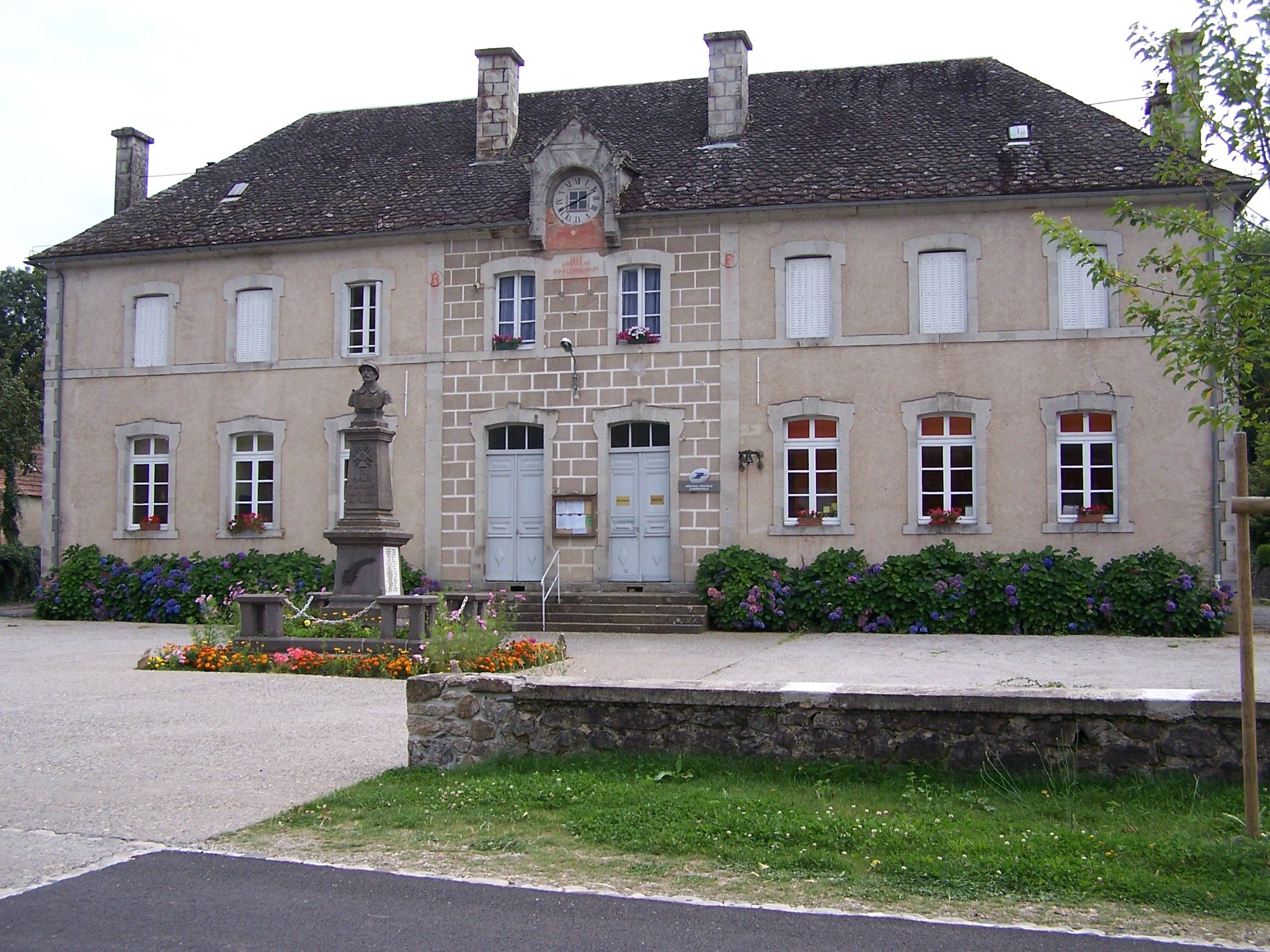
Antignac Town Hall and the War memorial

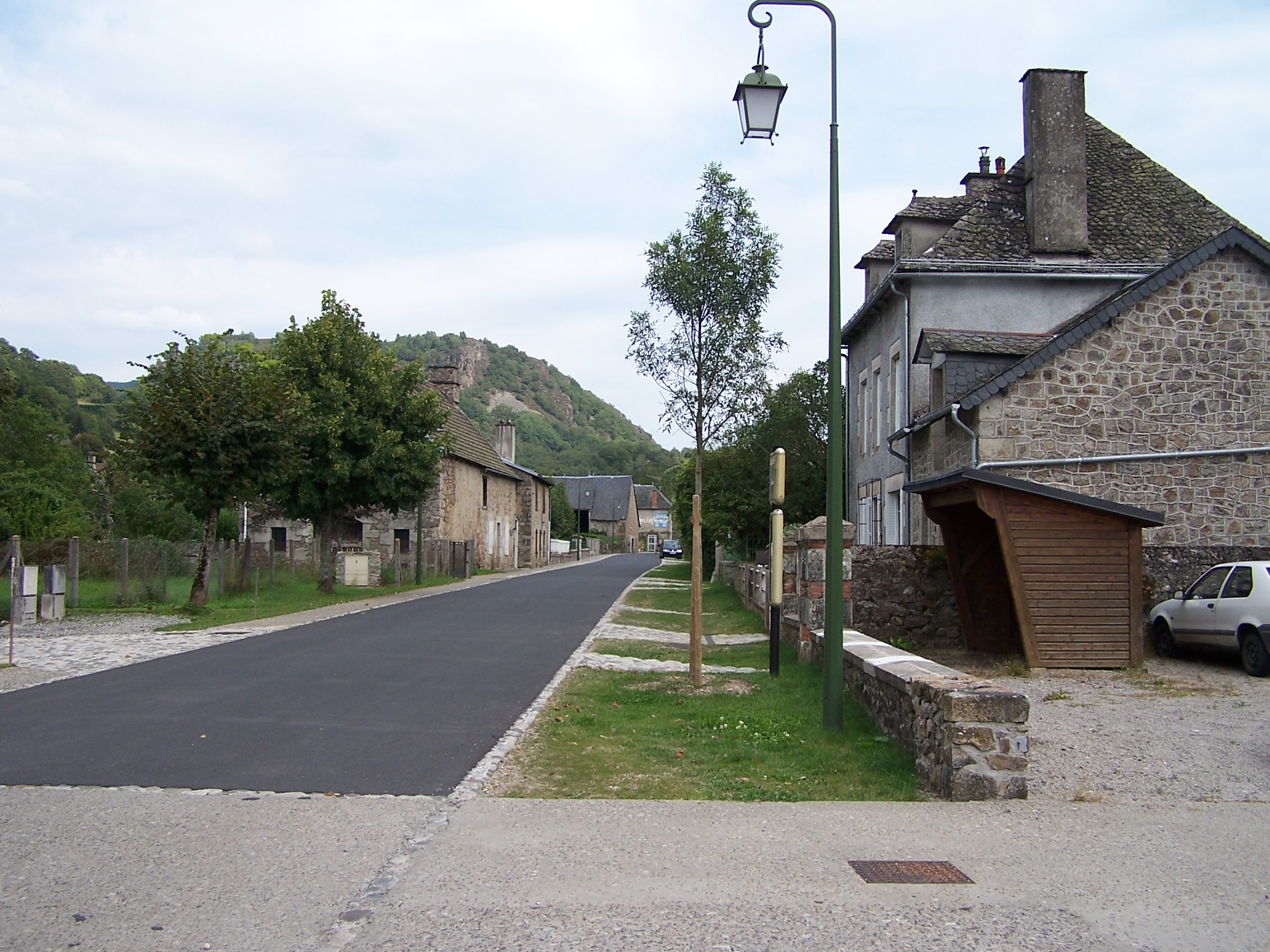
The main street facing east

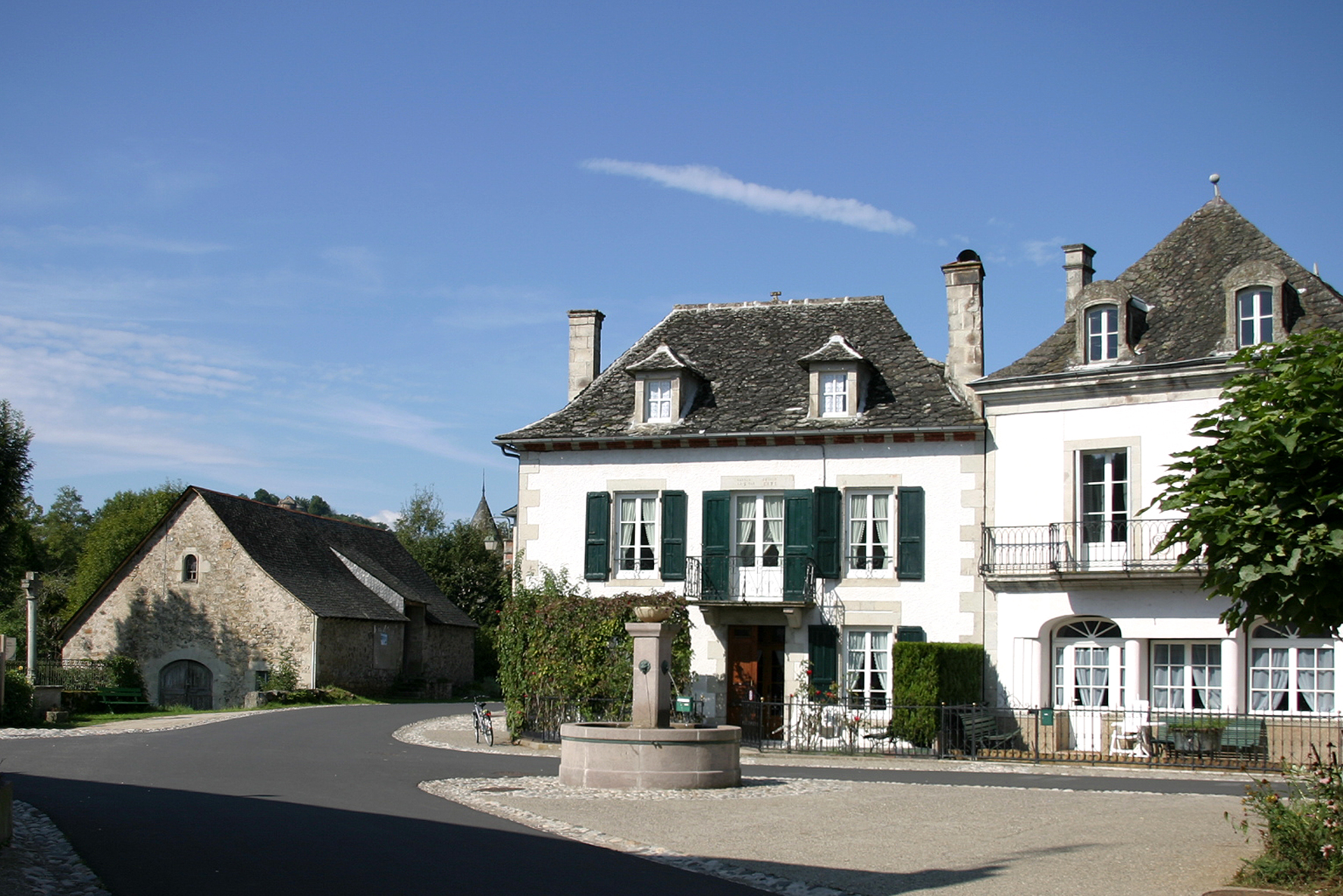
The Place de l'Auberge and its fountain

== Administration ==
List of Successive Mayors

| From | To | Name | Party |
|---|---|---|---|
| 1798 | 1799 | Jean-Baptiste Dubois | |
| 1799 | 1817 | Jean-François Dubois | |
| 1817 | 1847 | Louis Armand | |
| 1847 | 1848 | Pierre Brun | |
| 1848 | 1864 | Louis François Armand | |
| 1864 | 1881 | Jean-Baptiste Tournadre | |
| 1881 | 1897 | Paul-Antoine Mirande | |
| 1897 | 1919 | Gabriel Félix Duc | |
| 1919 | 1942 | Jean 'Eugène' Breton | |
| 1942 | 1953 | Pierre Chanut | |
| 1953 | 1983 | Roger Laboureix | |
| 1983 | 1990 | Claude Favory | |
| 1990 | 1995 | Charles Vayssier | |
| 1995 | 2001 | Claude Chanet | |
| 2001 | 2026 | Stéphane Briant | UDF then UDI then LREM |

== Population ==
The inhabitants of the commune are known as Antignacois or Antignacoises in French.

Historical population
| Year | Pop. | ±% p.a. |
|---|---|---|
| 1968 | 439 | — |
| 1975 | 361 | −2.76% |
| 1982 | 305 | −2.38% |
| 1990 | 335 | +1.18% |
| 1999 | 292 | −1.51% |
| 2007 | 277 | −0.66% |
| 2012 | 287 | +0.71% |
| 2017 | 281 | −0.42% |
| 2023 | 284 | +0.18% |
Source: INSEE

== Culture and heritage ==
=== Civil heritage ===
The commune has many buildings and structures that are registered as historical monuments:

- Farmhouses (18th-19th century) The Farmhouse at La Broconie contains Furniture which is registered as historical objects.
- Houses (16th-20th century)
- Houses and Farms (16th-20th century)
- A Farmhouse and Mill at le Soulou (19th century)
- The Grange du Pré de L'Oiseau Stables (19th century)
- The Wolf Trapping Pits at Urlande bas (19th century)
- The former School (1882) The School contains several religious items that are registered as historical objects.
- The Salsignac Railway Viaduct (20th century) on the stretch from Bort-les-Organs to Riom-ès-Montagnes on the Paris-Béziers railway line was commissioned on 2 December 1907 and closed in 1991. The viaduct is 190m long with 14 arches and is 24m high.
- The Barn-Stables at Le Beix (1878)

The Town Hall contains a War Memorial (1924) that is registered as an historical object.

Other sites of interest

- The Chateau of Longuevergne

=== Religious heritage ===
The commune has several religious buildings and structures that are registered as historical monuments:

- The Church of Saint-Étienne and Saint-Ferréol de Salsignac (12th century). Also called the Chapel Notre-Dame-du-Bon-Secours de Salsignac, this small Romanesque church was built in the 12th century and rebuilt in the Gothic style between 1469 and 1496. The bell located in a tiny bell tower dates from 1657. The Church contains many items that are registered as historical objects:
  - The Furniture in the Church
  - A Processional Banner (20th century)
  - A Statue: Saint Louis (19th century)
  - A Statue: Saint Ferréol of Vienne (19th century)
  - A Statue: Virgin and child (19th century)
  - A Stoup (16th century)
  - A Tabernacle (17th century)
  - A Monumental Painting (19th century)
- The Parish church of Saint-Victor and Saint-Pierre-ès-Liens (12th century). The apse and the choir are the only parts dating from the 12th century, the nave and the chapels were rebuilt or upgraded in the 18th and 19th centuries. The Church contains many items that are registered as historical objects:
  - The Furniture in the Chapel
  - A Chalice (18th century)
  - An Alb (20th century)
  - 2 Processional Banners (20th century)
  - The Saint-Pierre Bell (1472)
  - A Stoup (1753)
  - 2 Statues: Saints Peter and Paul (18th century)
  - 2 Statues: Adoring Angels (18th century)
  - Retables and Altar Paintings (18th century)
  - 2 Altar Paintings (19th century)
  - A Painting: Saint Peter delivered by an Angel (18th century)
  - A Monumental Painting (18th century)
  - A Statue: Saint Paul (17th century)
  - A Statue: Saint Peter (17th century)
- The Chapel of Notre-Dame du Roc-Vignonnet (ruins) (12th century). Begun in the early 12th century and completed in the 13th and 14th centuries, the chapel was finally abandoned in the 19th century. The Chapel contains some items that are registered as historical objects:
  - 14 Capitals and 13 Bases (11th century)
  - 33 Corbels (11th century)
- Monumental Crosses (19th-20th century)
- The Presbytery contains a Wardrobe (1807) that is registered as an historical object.

=== Environmental heritage ===
Two sites are registered as historical monuments:

- The Clairière médiévale des Roussilloux Park (Middle Ages)
- The Jardin Ethnobotanique Botanic Garden (20th century)

=== Antignac Picture Gallery ===
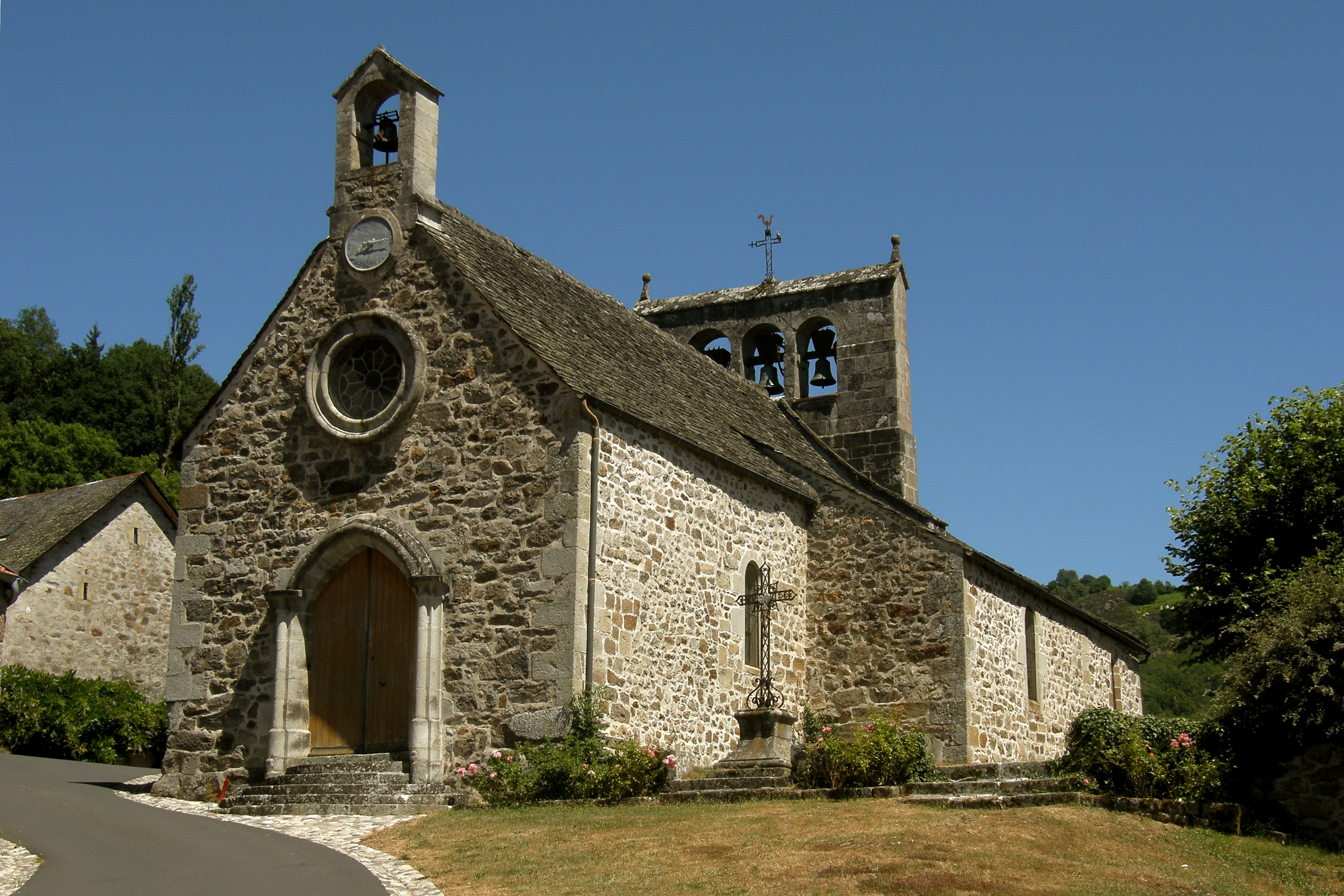
Antignac, Parish church of Saint-Victor

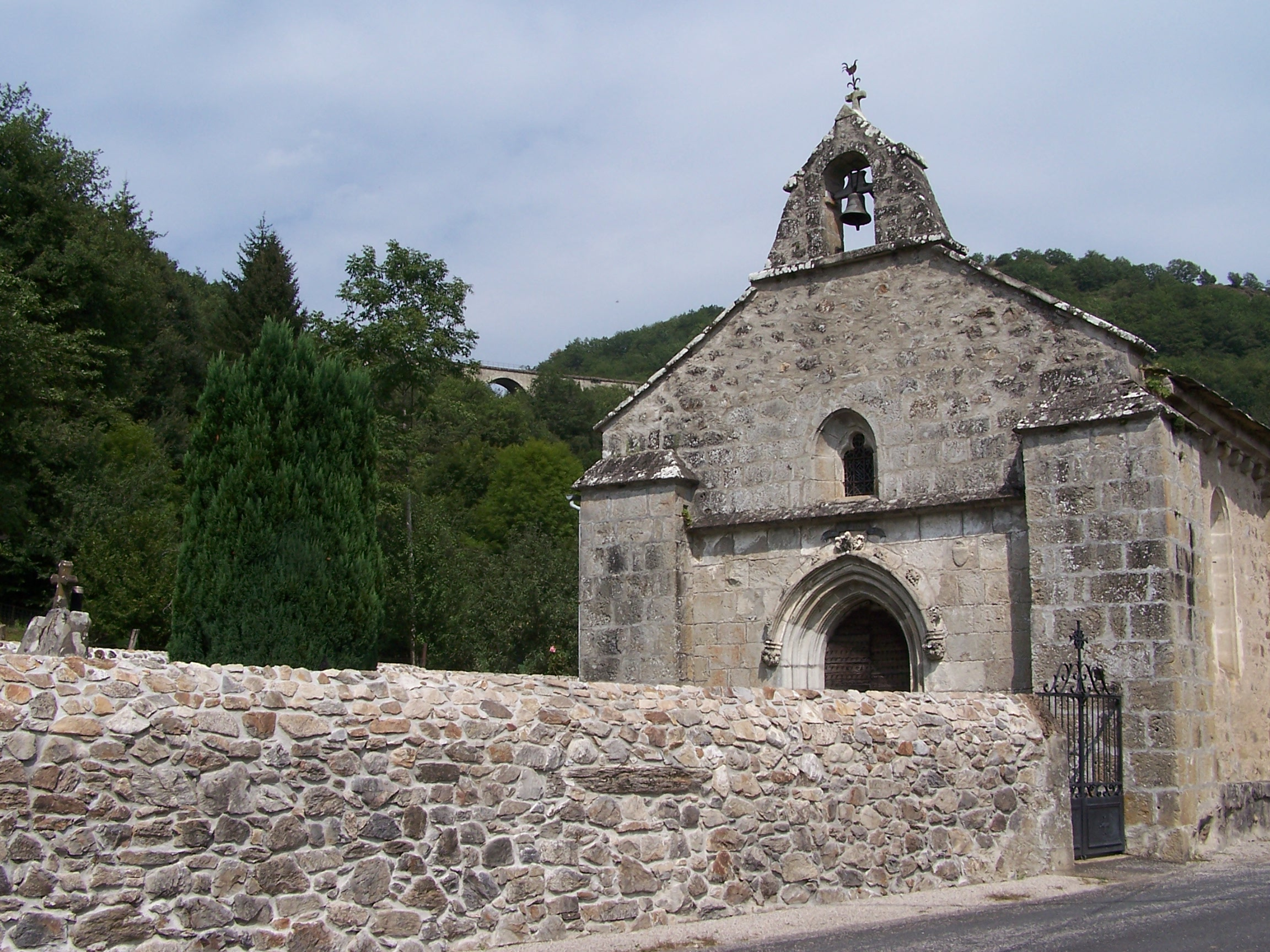
Salsignac, Chapel Saint-Ferréol, Notre-Dame-du-Bon-secours, dominated by the viaduct

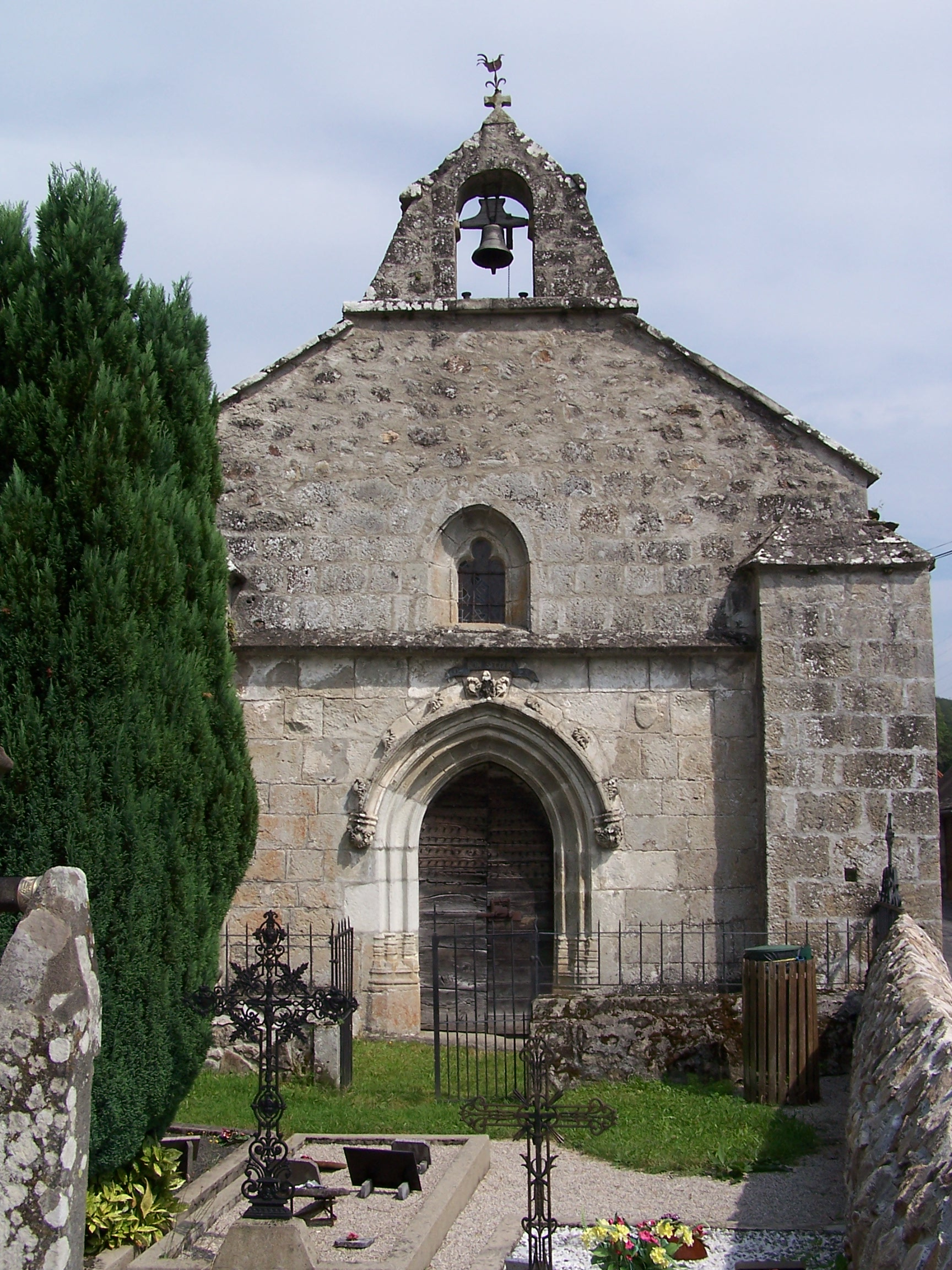
Salsignac, Chapel Saint-Ferréol, Notre-Dame-du-Bon-secours, and the cemetery

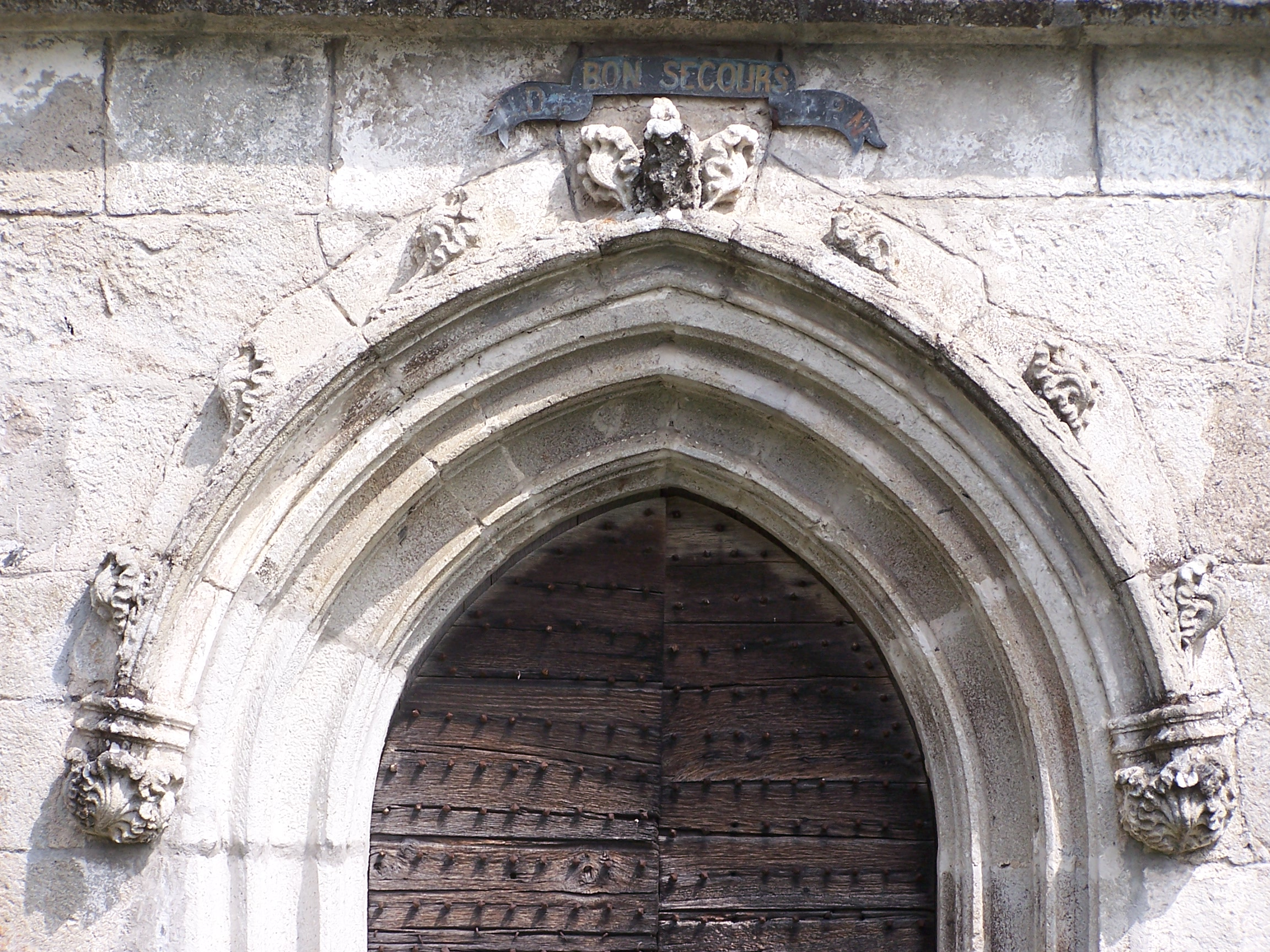
Arched door of Notre-Dame-du-Bon-secours, Salsignac

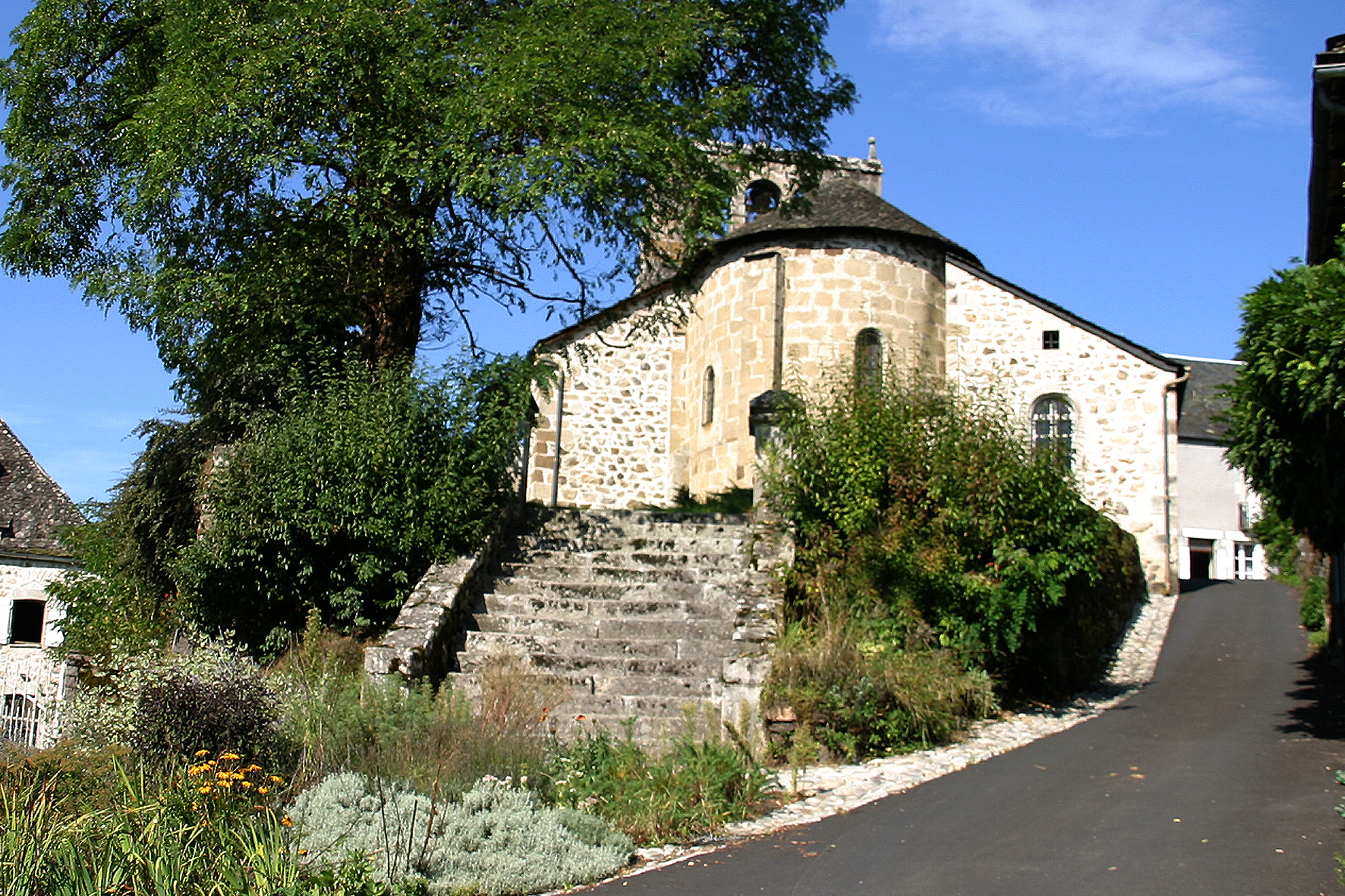
Church of Saint-Pierre-ès-Liens, Antignac, stone staircase

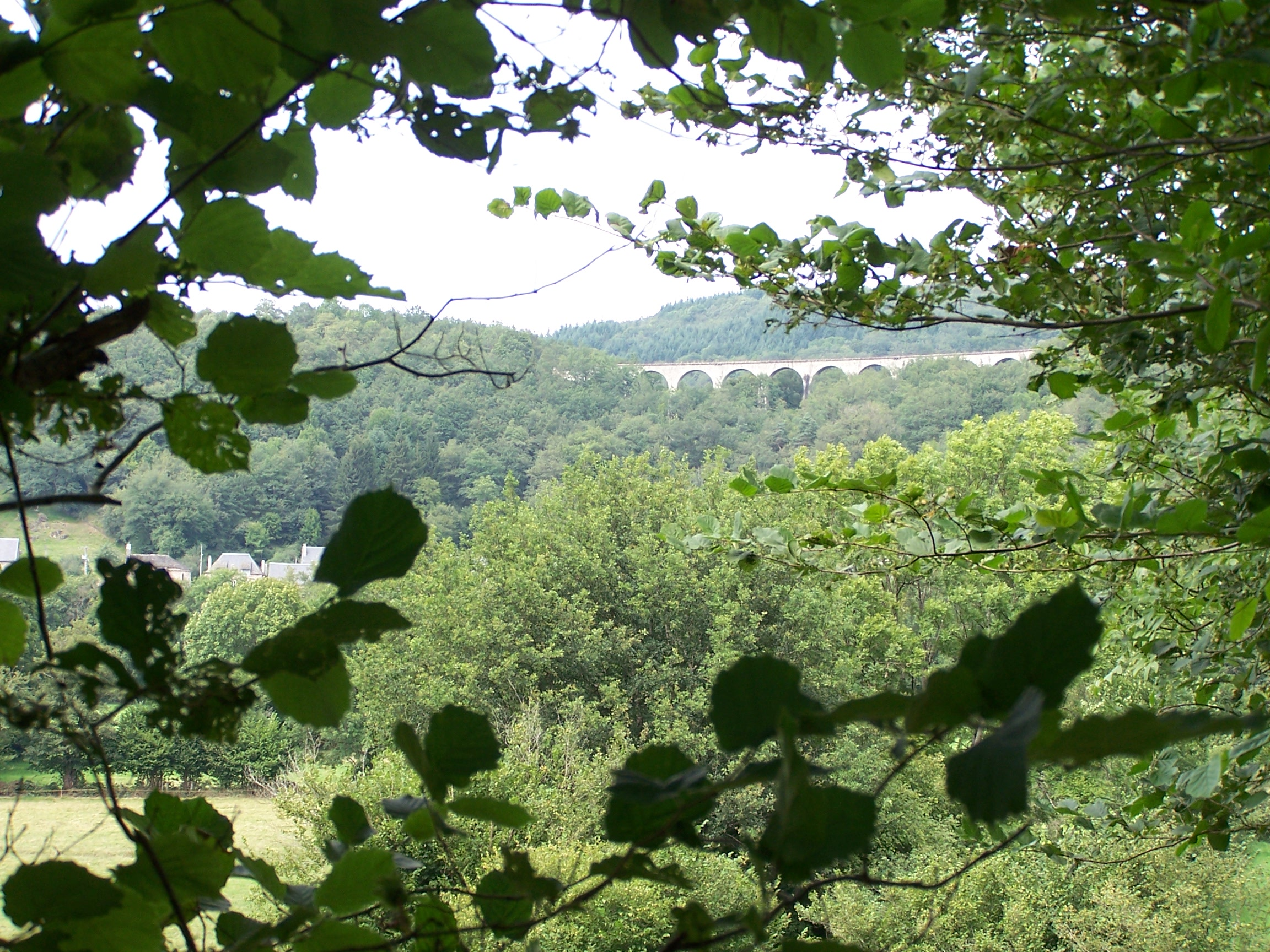
Salsignac Viaduct overlooking the village, seen from the hamlet of Beix

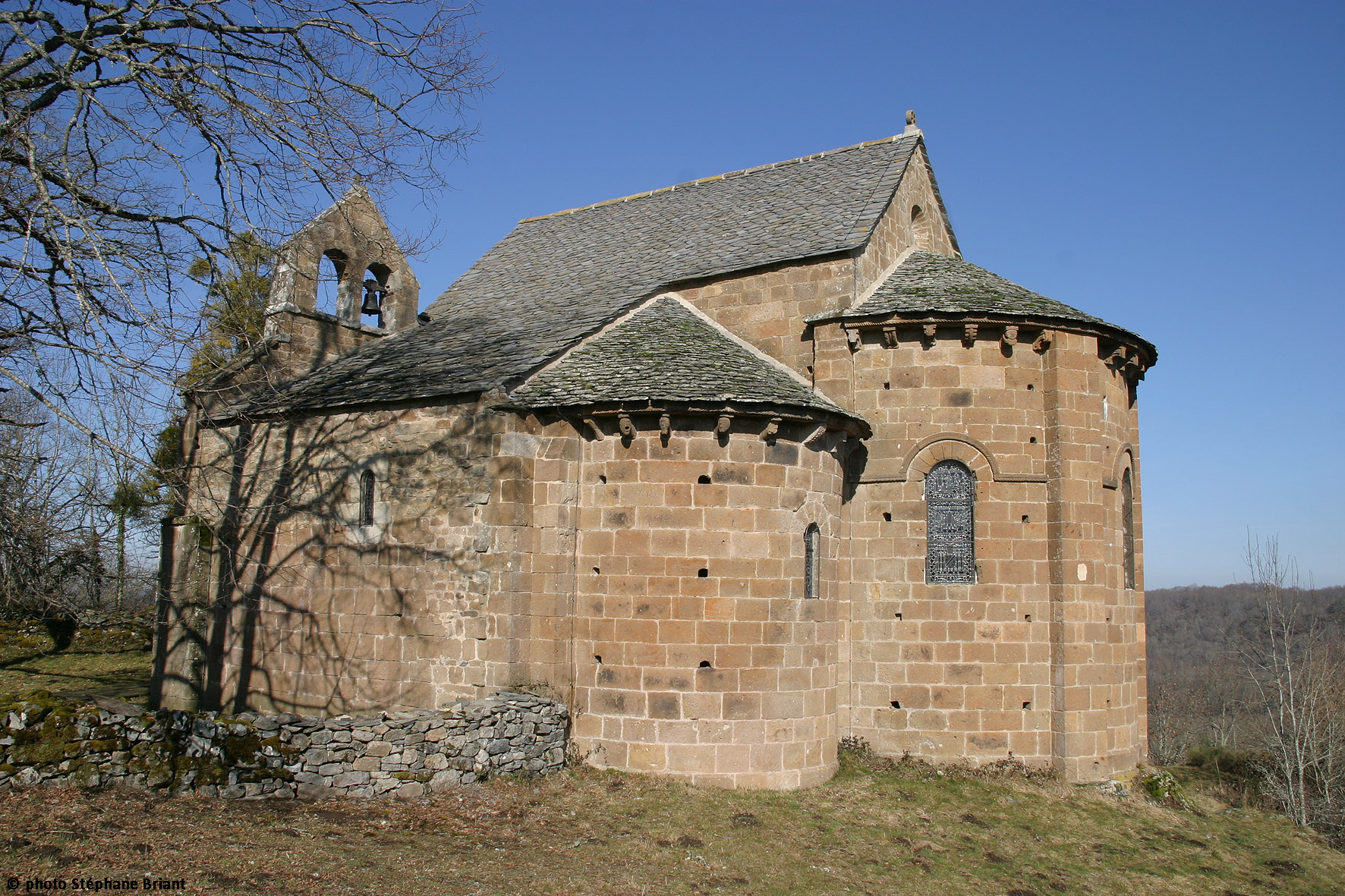
Chapel Notre-Dame du Roc-Vignonnet

== Notable people linked to the commune ==
- Jean Dutourd (born 14 January 1920 in Paris, where he died 17 January 2011), journalist and writer of the French Academy, author of the novel Au Bon Beurre, grandson of the House of Laurichesse at the Auberge de la Sumène d'Antignac. Became famous for his participation in the radio program Les grosses têtes (The big heads) presented by Philippe Bouvard.
- Jacques Jouve, born 10 March 1932 at Antignac. Communist MP for Haute-Vienne from 19 March 1978 to 22 May 1981.
- François-Paul Raynal (1902–1964), journalist at L'Auvergnat de Paris and writer, remained very attached to his roots and family home at Salsignac which he mentions in several of his novels and stories (Au fil de la Sumène, Les Artisans du village, Marie des Solitudes, etc.).
- François Aubert, mason, who decorated his house in a naive style (close to the ideal palace of Ferdinand Cheval) and created a mineralogical museum.

== See also ==
- Communes of the Cantal department
