= Marie-Françoise Pérol-Dumont =

French politician

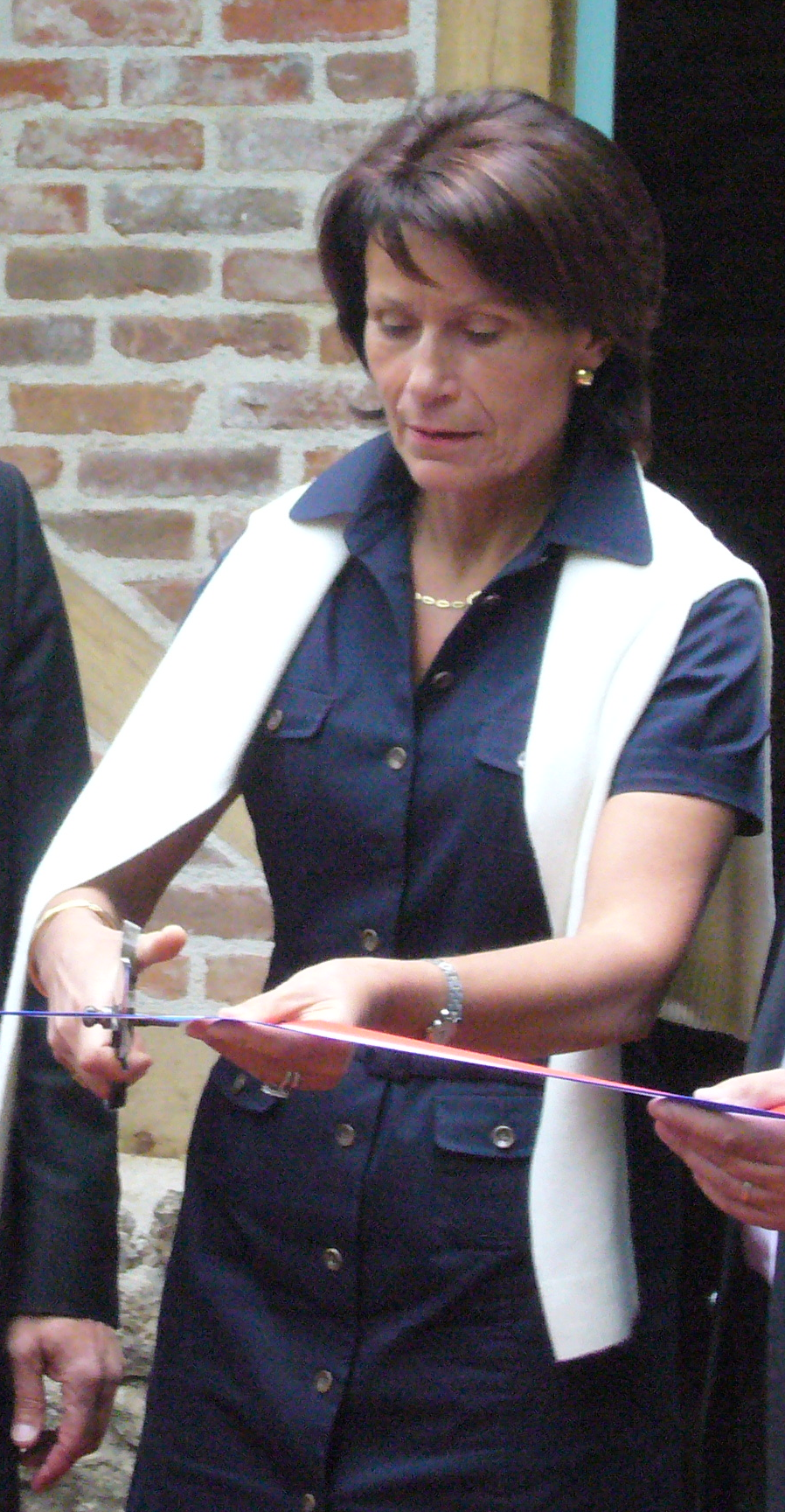
Marie-Françoise Pérol-Dumont

Marie-Françoise Pérol-Dumont (born 26 May 1952) has been serving as Senator for the Haute-Vienne department since 2014.

From 2004 to 2015, she was president of the departmental council of Haute-Vienne. She was previously the vice-president of the departmental council from 1992 to 2001 and Secretary of the National Assembly from 1998 to 2004. She is a member of the Socialist Party.
