= Georges Jouve =

French ceramist

Georges Jouve was an important ceramicist of the 20th century. He was born in 1910 in Fontenay-sous-Bois and his parents were both decorators. At 17 years old, Jouve enrolled at the prestigious Ecole Boulle in Paris, where he received theoretical instruction in Art History in addition to his technical studies as a sculptor. After graduating in 1930, he embarked on his artistic career as a theatrical set designer. During World War II, Jouve was captured by the Germans and interned in a German camp. After several attempts he escaped from the camp and took refuge at his step-parents home in a potters' village in the south of France, called Dieulefit. In 1944, Jouve and his family moved back to Paris. He opened his studio in Paris and was invited by Jacques Adnet to participate in the exhibition “La Ceramique Contemporaine” by the Compagnie des Arts Francais. He then participated annually in numerous 'Salons' in France and internationally such as the “Salon des Artistes Decorateurs” in Paris, Association Francaise d'Action Artistique in Rio de Janeiro, and Vienna, Toronto, Rome, Milan, and Cairo.

Jouve died in 1964.

== Selected books ==
Brunhammer, Yovonne, Delaporte Guilemette. Le style des annees 30 a 50. Editions de l illustration Baschet & Cie, Paris, 1987.

Fare, Michel. La ceramique contemporaine. Compagnie des Arts Photomecaniques. Strasbourg, Paris. 1953.
