= Monique Boulestin =

French politician (born 1951)

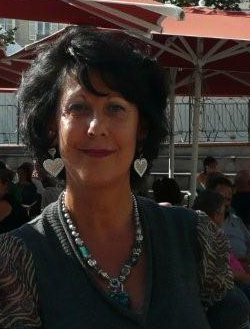
Monique Boulestin

Monique Boulestin (born 13 March 1951 in Châlus, Haute-Vienne) was a member of the National Assembly of France. She represented Haute-Vienne's 1st constituency, and was a member of the Socialiste, radical, citoyen et divers gauche.
