= Jacques Jouve =

French politician

Deputy of the 3rd Circuit of Haute-Vienne
- In office 19 March 1978 – 22 May 1981

Personal details
- Born: 10 March 1932 Antignac, France
- Died: 27 October 2014 (aged 82) Limoges, France
- Party: French Communist Party
- Occupation: Politician

Jacques Jouve (French pronunciation: [ʒɑk ʒuv]; 10 March 1932 — 27 October 2014) was a French politician.

He was member of the French Communist Party and served as deputy of the 3rd Circuit of Haute-Vienne from 1978 to 1981. He was elected regional councilor in 1986. He exercises the function of vice president, in charge of transport throughout this period. He remained a municipal councilor until 2001.

== Biography ==
Jacques Jouve was born in Antignac, France on 1932 and died in Limoges, France on 2014 at the age of 82. He was responsible for organizing a transfer of funds in 1958 to the National Liberation Front. He was arrested in August by the Direction de la surveillance du territoire (DST). He was struck off the PTT and expelled from Algeria in 1959. He gradually withdrew from political life after 1998.

Political offices
Preceded by -	Deputy of the 3rd Circuit of Haute-Vienne; 19 March 1978 – 22 May 1981	Succeeded by -
