= Jean-Claude Peyronnet =

French politician

- Born: 7 November 1940
- Occupation: Member of the Senate of France

Jean-Claude Peyronnet (born 7 November 1940) is a member of the Senate of France, representing the Haute-Vienne department. He is a member of the Socialist Party.
