= Léon Betoulle =

French politician

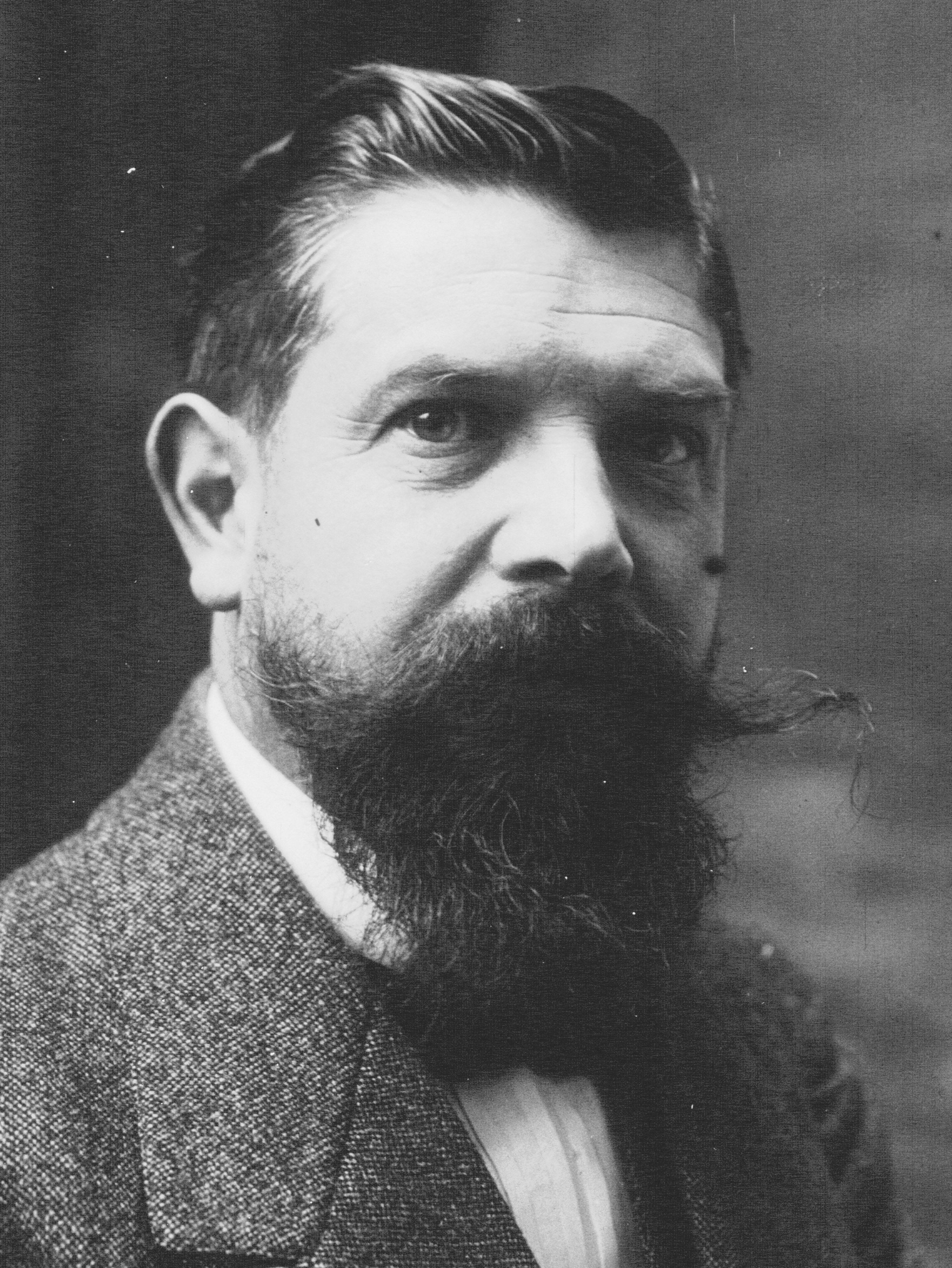

Mayor of Limoges
- In office 1947–1956
- Preceded by: Georges Guingouin
- Succeeded by: Louis Longequeue

Senator of the French Third Republic
- In office 1924–1940

Deputy of the Haute-Vienne
- In office 1906–1924

Personal details
- Born: Léonard Léon Betoulle; October 25, 1871 Limoges, France
- Died: November 30, 1956 (aged 85) Limoges, France
- Party: French Section of the Workers' International
- Occupation: Politician

Léonard Léon Betoulle (25 October 1871 — 30 November 1956) was a French politician.

He was member of the French Section of the Workers' International Party and served as mayors of Limoges from 1947 to 1956. He was a member of parliament for Haute-Vienne from 1906 to 1924. He was then senator for Haute-Vienne from 1924 to 1944. He voted full powers to Marshal Pétain in 1940. He was dismissed from the town hall with his municipal council in 1941. He also president of the general council of Haute-Vienne from 1929 to 1940. He had also been excluded from the French Section of the Workers' International party and had joined the Democratic Socialist Party, a reception structure for socialists compromised under the Vichy regime. He stayed away from public life after the Liberation.

== Biography ==
Léon Betoulle was born in Limoges, France on 1871 and died in same place Limoges, France on 1956 at the age of 85. He managed to reconquer his post in 1947 and kept it until his death in 1956, after being re-elected one last time in 1953.

Political offices
Preceded by Georges Guingouin	Mayor of Limoges; 1947 – 1956	Succeeded by Louis Longequeue
Preceded by -	Senator of the French Third Republic; 1924 – 1940	Succeeded by -
Preceded by -	Deputy of the Haute-Vienne; 1906 – 1924	Succeeded by -
