= Jean-Pierre Demerliat =

French politician (born 1943)

Jean-Pierre Demerliat (born 8 May 1943) is a former member of the Senate of France. He represented the Haute-Vienne department in the Limousin region from 1990 to 2014 and is a member of the Socialist Party.
