= Camille Senon =

French resistance fighter and trade unionist (1925–2025)

- Born: 5 June 1925; Oradour-sur-Glane, France
- Died: 2 October 2025 (aged 100); Limoges, France
- Occupation: Trade unionist

Camille Senon (French pronunciation: [kamil sənɔ̃]; 5 June 1925 – 2 October 2025) was a French resistance fighter and trade unionist.

== Life and career ==
Born in Oradour-sur-Glane on 5 June 1925, Senon was the daughter of Martial Senon, a farmer and World War I soldier killed in the Oradour-sur-Glane massacre on 10 June 1944. In that event, the 2nd SS Panzer Division Das Reich led by Adolf Diekmann killed 643 men, women, and children. Working in Limoges at the time, Senon took the tram to meet her parents. She arrived just in time to witness the horrors of that day and devoted much of her later life to giving her testimony. She advocated against Nazism, war, and senseless killings.

In 1953, Senon testified at the trial for the perpetrators of the massacre. Several commanders were notably absent from the trial, including Heinz Lammerding, who had been commanded by Gerd von Rundstedt. Lammerding was sentenced to death in absentia and never faced a prison sentence in France, much to the chagrin of victims and their families.

Senon passed the exam for the Federation of Employees in the Postal and Telecommunications Sector in 1945 and moved to Paris in 1950 to become Secretary of the Syndicat des chèques postaux de Paris. She took part in several strikes, notably in 1953, 1968, and 1974. She retired in 1985. In addition to her trade union activities, she was a member of the French Communist Party and was active in the Association des familles des martyrs d'Oradour-sur-Glane, the Association du Souvenir des Fusillés du Mont Valérien, and the Fédération nationale des déportés et internés résistants et patriotes. In 2014, she ran for the municipal council of Limoges as a member of the Left Front. Reaching the age of 100 in 2025, she gave testimony once again about the Oradour-sur-Glane massacre.

Senon died on 2 October 2025, at the age of 100.

== Honors ==
- Allée Camille-Senon in Saint-Junien (2021)
- Comics album Oradour 1944. L'Innocence assassinée (2024)

== Decorations ==
- Officer of the Legion of Honour (2009)
- Knight of the Ordre des Palmes académiques (2008)
- Commander of the Ordre national du Mérite (2016, refused)
