= Heinz Barth =

WW2 Nazi SS officer & war criminal (1920-2007)

- Barth during his trial (1983)
- Born: 15 October 1920; Gransee, Free State of Prussia, Weimar Republic
- Died: 6 August 2007 (aged 86); Gransee, Brandenburg, Germany
- Known for: Oradour-sur-Glane massacre
- Political party: Nazi Party
- Status: Deceased
- Convictions: France; War crimes (in absentia); East Germany; War crimes Crimes against humanity
- Penalty: France; Death (in absentia); East Germany; Life imprisonment

Details
- Date apprehended: 14 July 1981
- SS service
- Allegiance: Nazi Germany
- Branch: Waffen-SS
- Service years: 1943–1945
- Rank: Obersturmführer

Heinz Barth (15 October 1920 – 6 August 2007) was a mid-ranking member in the Waffen-SS of Nazi Germany during World War II. He was a convicted war criminal who was responsible for the Oradour-sur-Glane massacre of 1944.

Barth was the only SS officer involved in the Oradour massacre to have been judged. He was found guilty by an East German court in 1983. Awarded a "war victim" pension (which later became a wide-ranging controversy and led to changes in German law regarding war or disability pensions for World War II war criminals) by the reunified German government in 1991, he was released in 1997 and died in 2007.

== Military and SS career ==
In 1938, he joined the National Socialist Motor Corps, taking motorised para-military training. He joined the Nazi Party on 9 November 1939, the 16th anniversary of the Beer Hall Putsch, with Party #7,844,901.

Barth enlisted in the military police, where he was made an officer. The 1983 East German court found that Barth participated, as a member of security police battalion, in the execution of 92 Czech civilians during martial law in the summer of 1942 in Klatovy and Pardubice. He was also one of those who, in June 1942, took part in the killing of adult men and women in Ležáky, according to the historian Eduard Stehlík from the Military History Institute in Prague.

Barth joined the SS on 10 February 1943 (n°458037) with the rank of Untersturmführer (Second Lieutenant) and was assigned to the SS-Kraft Pioneers detachment. On 15 January 1943, he was moved to the 10th SS Panzer Division Frundsberg, later to the 3rd SS Division Totenkopf, and then, in October 1943, to the Eastern Front in the 2nd SS Division Das Reich. He led a section in the 3rd company, 1st battalion of the 4th Panzergrenadier regiment Der Führer of the division.

In 1944, he became part of Adolf Diekmann's battalion, being under the direct command of Otto Erich Kahn. He then took part in the June 1944 Oradour-sur-Glane massacre by leading the group which led the men of the village into a barn and commanding the fire. During his 1983 trial, he testified to having personally shot roughly twelve to fifteen times into the crowd. He also confirmed that the massacre of 642 civilians (the whole village, including more than 200 children) had no military objective.

== Trial and conviction ==
After the end of the war, Barth returned to his hometown in Brandenburg in the then German Democratic Republic. According to the AFP, he returned under a false name. He was tried in France in absentia on 12 February 1953, and sentenced to death for war crimes.

Identified and arrested on 14 June 1981 in Gransee, following an extensive investigation by the Stasi, Barth was tried in 1983 in East Germany and sentenced to life imprisonment for war crimes. The prosecutor, Horst Busse, said he did not seek a death sentence since Barth had fully cooperated throughout the investigation. Busse instead requested a life sentence for Barth, calling him "a relentless officer and a cold-blooded, merciless executor of fascist violence."

Barth was the only SS officer to have been judged for the massacre. He claimed he was only following orders, and said he would have been court-martialed had he not obeyed. The defense was rejected by Busse. While on the witness stand, Barth started sobbing and expressed shame over the massacre.

"I am ashamed that as a young man I took part in these operations in occupied countries and I hope such things can never happen again. The statesmen living today must take care that such a thing never happens again."

Other Nazi officers involved had taken refuge in West Germany (such as General Heinz Lammerding, commander of the Das Reich division) and had not been judged. Lammerding took up residence in Bad Tölz. Barth was released in 1997 reportedly in consideration of his age and health and for having "expressed remorse". At the time of his release, Barth said he felt guilty, but that he had "paid long enough."

== Controversy ==
Controversy arose because of the 800 mark pension Barth had been receiving as a wounded veteran for his lost leg since 1991, following German reunification. In 2000, a tribunal in Potsdam canceled the pension with the argument that a war criminal should not be granted a pension. In 2001, the Bundestag enacted a law stripping war criminals from obtaining disability compensation. Barth's death was announced on 14 August 2007 by a priest in Gransee. However, the priest only said that he died within the last few days of cancer, and did not disclose the place or exact date of his death.

Nazi hunter Serge Klarsfeld commented that "the man responsible of this horrible crime [in Oradour-sur-Glane], the one who had authorised its execution, General Heinz Lammerding, who lived in the Federal Republic of Germany, died unpunished."
