= Helmut Kämpfe =

German Waffen-SS officer (1909–1944)

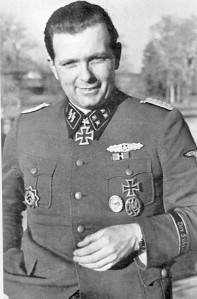
- Born: 31 July 1909; Jena, Saxe-Weimar-Eisenach, German Empire
- Died: 10 June 1944 (aged 34); German-occupied France
- Military career
- Allegiance: Nazi Germany
- Branch: Waffen SS
- Service years: 1939–44
- Rank: Sturmbannführer
- Unit: 2nd SS Panzer Division Das Reich
- Commands: 3rd Battalion, 4th SS-Panzergrenadier Der Führer Regiment
- Known for: Executing 99 French men in the Tulle massacre
- Conflicts: World War II
- Awards: Knight's Cross of the Iron Cross; Iron Cross 1st Class; Iron Cross 2nd Class; German Cross in Gold; Close Combat Clasp in Gold; Wound Badge in Silver; General Assault Badge

Helmut Kämpfe (31 July 1909 – 10 June 1944) was a Waffen-SS Sturmbannführer who was captured and executed in occupied France by the French Resistance. In response, troops of the 2nd SS Panzer Division Das Reich killed 643 men, women and children in Oradour-sur-Glane on 10 June 1944 (the Oradour massacre). Adolf Diekmann, the SS commander who ordered the massacre, said the death of Kämpfe was the reason for the killings, although Kämpfe was still alive at the time. His car had been ambushed by French partisans who later reportedly burned him alive.

Kämpfe was a commander in the Division Das Reich. He received both the Close Combat Clasp in Gold and the Knight's Cross of the Iron Cross. He was known for hanging 99 French civilians in the Tulle massacre.

== Biography ==
Kämpfe was born in Saxe-Weimar-Eisenach (now Thüringia), German Empire in 1909. He trained to be a typographer like his father, but after Hitler took power in 1933 he became a Leutnant in the Heer, and transferred to the Waffen-SS in 1939. On the Eastern Front in Russia he commanded the 3rd Battalion, 4th SS-Panzergrenadier Der Führer Regiment, the Das Reich Division's reconnaissance group. Kämpfe received the Knight's Cross of the Iron Cross for bravery and exemplary leadership during the Zhitomir–Berdichev Offensive in the winter of 1943-44.

In spring 1944, the Das Reich Division had been withdrawn from Russia and sent to the south of France for refitting in preparation for the anticipated Allied invasion of occupied Europe. While in southern France, Kämpfe was ordered to begin operations against the Maquis (rural guerillas who – according to German intelligence reports – were active in the southern uplands of central France). On 9 June 1944, he was captured 4 kilometres (2.5 mi) east of Saint-Léonard-de-Noblat by a group led by a Sergeant Jean Canou from Colonel Georges Guingouin's Brigade, a militant Communist group in the Maquis du Limousin. Canou handed him over to Guingouin, who ordered him executed the following day. According to a French informant, Kämpfe was burned alive in front of an audience, but the exact circumstances remain unclear.

When it was discovered that the officer had been kidnapped, troops from the Das Reich division and members of the Milice began a brutal search of the surrounding area for Kämpfe. Two local men were shot dead 2.5 kilometres (1.6 mi) east of Saint-Léonard-de-Noblat. Later that day, troops of the 1st Battalion, Das Reich committed the massacre at Oradour-sur-Glane.

The commander of the 4th SS Panzer Grenadier Regiment, SS-Standartenführer Sylvester Stadler ordered a court martial into the massacre at Oradour-sur-Glane. SS-Sturmbannführer Adolf Diekmann, the commander of the 1st Battalion, 4th SS Panzer Grenadier Regiment, and a personal friend of Kämpfe, was charged over the killings. He said he found Kämpfe's handcuffed body inside a German field ambulance with the remains of other German soldiers just outside the village of Oradour-sur-Glane. The vehicle had been set alight, burning alive everyone inside. After seeing his friend's fate, Diekmann ordered the village destroyed. SS-Brigadeführer Heinz Lammerding, Das Reich's division commander, agreed that Diekmann should face a court martial. All charges were dropped when Diekmann was killed fighting in Normandy on 29 June 1944. A monument designed by the artist Jean-Joseph Sanfourche, commemorates these events; the capture it is located alongside departmental road 941 in Moissannes.

== Bibliography ==
- Berger, Florian (2004). Ritterkreuzträger mit Nahkampfspange in Gold [Knight's Cross Bearers with the Close Combat Clasp in Gold] (in German). Vienna, Austria: Selbstverlag Florian Berger. ISBN 978-3-9501307-3-7.
- Fellgiebel, Walther-Peer (2000) [1986]. Die Träger des Ritterkreuzes des Eisernen Kreuzes 1939–1945 — Die Inhaber der höchsten Auszeichnung des Zweiten Weltkrieges aller Wehrmachtteile [The Bearers of the Knight's Cross of the Iron Cross 1939–1945 — The Owners of the Highest Award of the Second World War of all Wehrmacht Branches] (in German). Friedberg, Germany: Podzun-Pallas. ISBN 978-3-7909-0284-6.
- Penaud, Guy. Oradour-sur-Glane - Un jour de juin 1944 en enfer, Geste éditions, mars 2014, ISBN 2 367 46171 6.
- Scherzer, Veit [in German] (2007). Ritterkreuzträger 1939–1945 [The Knight's Cross Bearers 1939–1945] (in German) (2nd ed.). Ranis: Verlag Veit Scherzer. ISBN 978-3-938845-17-2. OCLC 891773959. Wikidata Q131160320.
