= Hébras =

Hébras is a French surname. Notable people with the surname include:

- Robert Hébras (1925–2023), French Resistance member
- Simon Hébras (born 1988), French footballer
