= Robert Hébras =

One of the survivors of the 1944 Oradour-sur-Glane massacre (1925-2023)

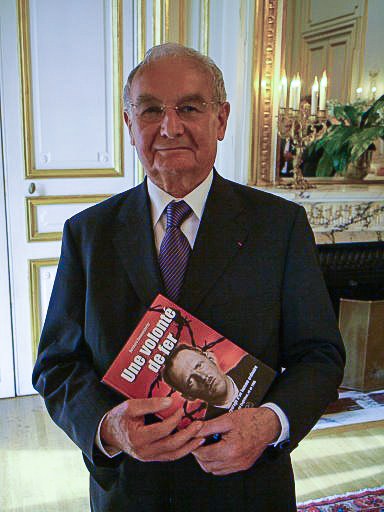
- Robert Hébras in 2008
- Born: 29 June 1925; Oradour-sur-Glane, France
- Died: 11 February 2023 (aged 97); Saint-Junien, France
- Occupations: Writer; Resistant
- Known for: Survivor of the Oradour-sur-Glane massacre

Robert Hébras (French pronunciation: [ʁɔbɛʁ ebʁas]; 29 June 1925 – 11 February 2023) was one of only six people to survive the Oradour-sur-Glane massacre by Nazi Germany's Waffen-SS Das Reich Panzer Division on 10 June 1944.

He was born in Oradour-sur-Glane, the son of Jean, a tramway maintenance official and Marie, a seamstress. Adolf Diekmann, the Waffen-SS officer who commanded the battalion that perpetrated the massacre, was killed in action in Normandy on 29 June 1944, coincidentally Hébras's 19th birthday.

In 2014, he published a memoir, Avant que ma voix s’éteigne. Hébras died in 2023 at age 97. He was the last living survivor of the Oradour-sur-Glane massacre.

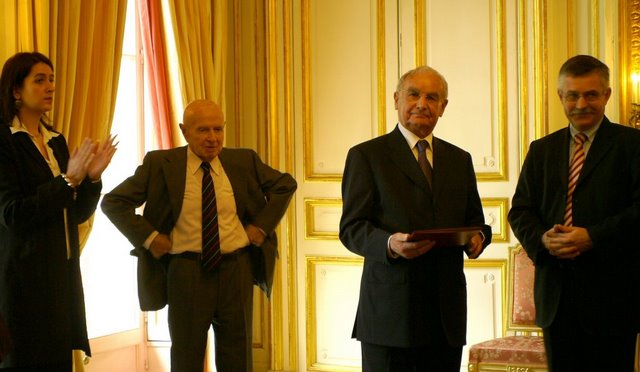
Granddaughter Delphine Hébras, 99-year-old Jean Serog, Robert Hébras, and Austria's ambassador in Paris, Hubert Heiss

== Awards and decorations ==
- Officer of the Legion of Honour (13 July 2010)
  - Chevalier of the Legion of Honour (9 June 2001)
- Commander of the Ordre national du Mérite (25 January 2022)
- Commander of the Ordre des Palmes académiques (30 November 2019)
- Order of Merit of the Federal Republic of Germany (2 June 2015)
