= Tulle massacre =

German mass killing in France, 1944

- Part of World War II
- Location: 45°15′06″N 1°45′10″E; Tulle, Corrèze, Limousin, France
- Date: 9 June 1944
- Deaths: 117 killed, 7–9 June, 149 deported (of whom 101 died in Dachau)
- Victim: French civilians
- Perpetrator: Nazi Germany: 2nd SS Panzer Division Das Reich

Location of Tulle in France

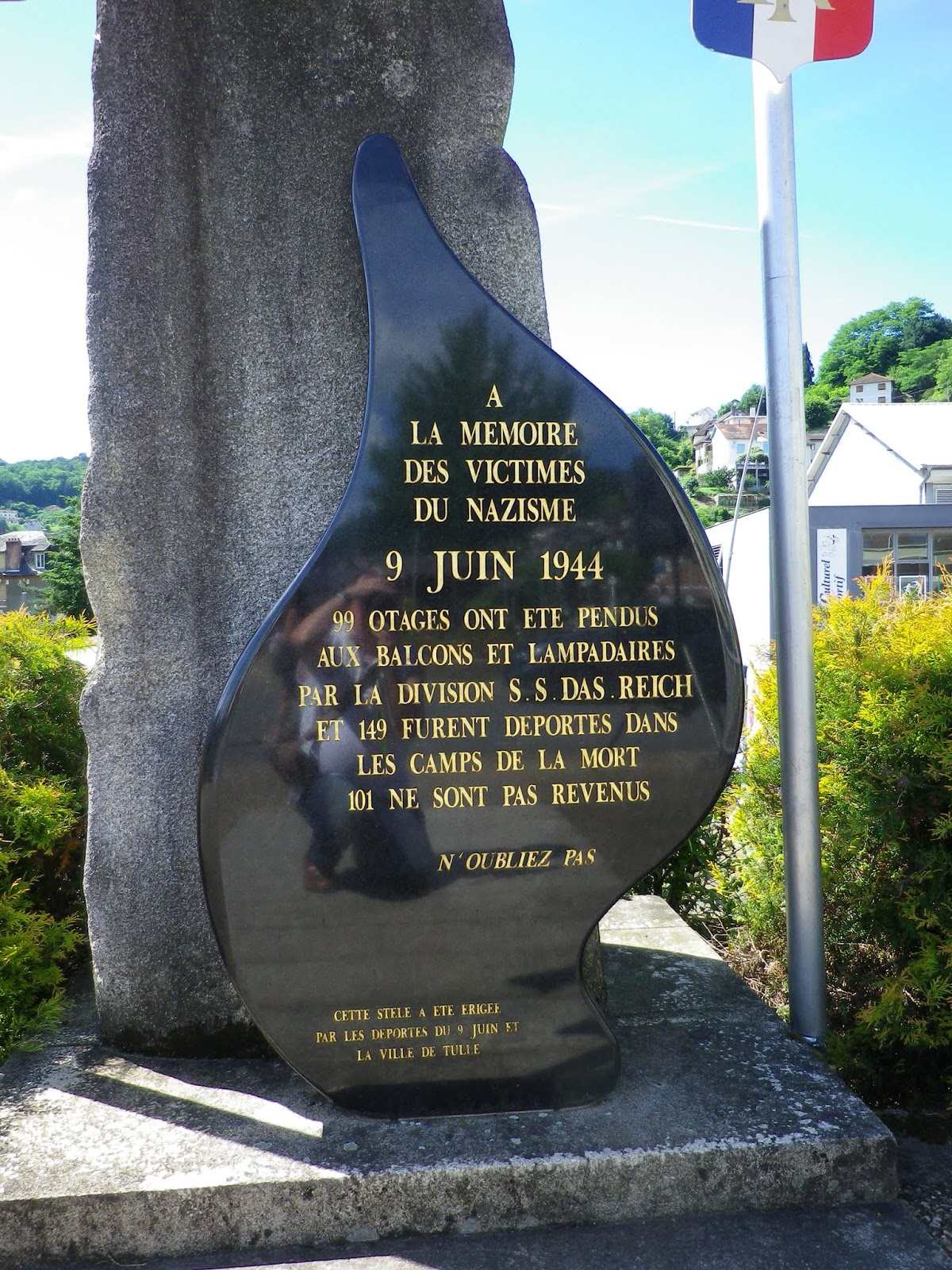

The Tulle massacre was the roundup and summary execution of civilians in the French town of Tulle by the 2nd SS Panzer Division Das Reich in June 1944, three days after the D-Day landings in World War II.

After a successful offensive by the French Resistance group Francs-tireur on 7 and 8 June 1944, the arrival of Das Reich troops forced the Maquis to flee the city of Tulle (department of Corrèze) in south-central France. On 9 June 1944, after arresting all men between the ages of sixteen and sixty, the Schutzstaffel (SS) and Sicherheitsdienst (SD) ordered 120 of the prisoners to be hanged, of whom 99 were actually hanged. In the days that followed, 149 men were sent to the Dachau concentration camp, where 101 died. In total, the actions of the Wehrmacht, the Waffen-SS, and the SD claimed the lives of 213 civilian residents of Tulle.

A day later, the same 2nd SS Panzer Division Das Reich was involved in the massacre at Oradour-sur-Glane.

== Historical context ==
=== 2nd SS Panzer Division ===
Insignia of the 2nd SS Panzer Division Das Reich

At the beginning of 1944, after suffering heavy losses on the Eastern Front, the 2nd SS Panzer Division Das Reich, under the command of SS-Gruppenführer Heinz Lammerding regrouped in Valence-d'Agen to prepare to depart for the Western Front. They were to respond to the purported landing of 18,000 Allied soldiers supported by light armored vehicles and tanks.

Historically, there have been several theories for the reason behind the 2nd Panzer Division's role in the massacres. According to Peter Lieb, these were the division's belief in the ideology of national socialism, their battle experience on the Eastern Front, that they saw themselves as an elite military unit, and that they had already participated in engagements with the French Resistance.

After the Normandy Landings, the 2nd Panzer Division received orders to position themselves in the region between Tulle and Limoges to suppress the Maquis, who, in coordination with the Allied invasion, were intensifying their insurgency against German interests and forces. It was the personal wish of Hitler that the division confront the Maquis in the face of their escalation.

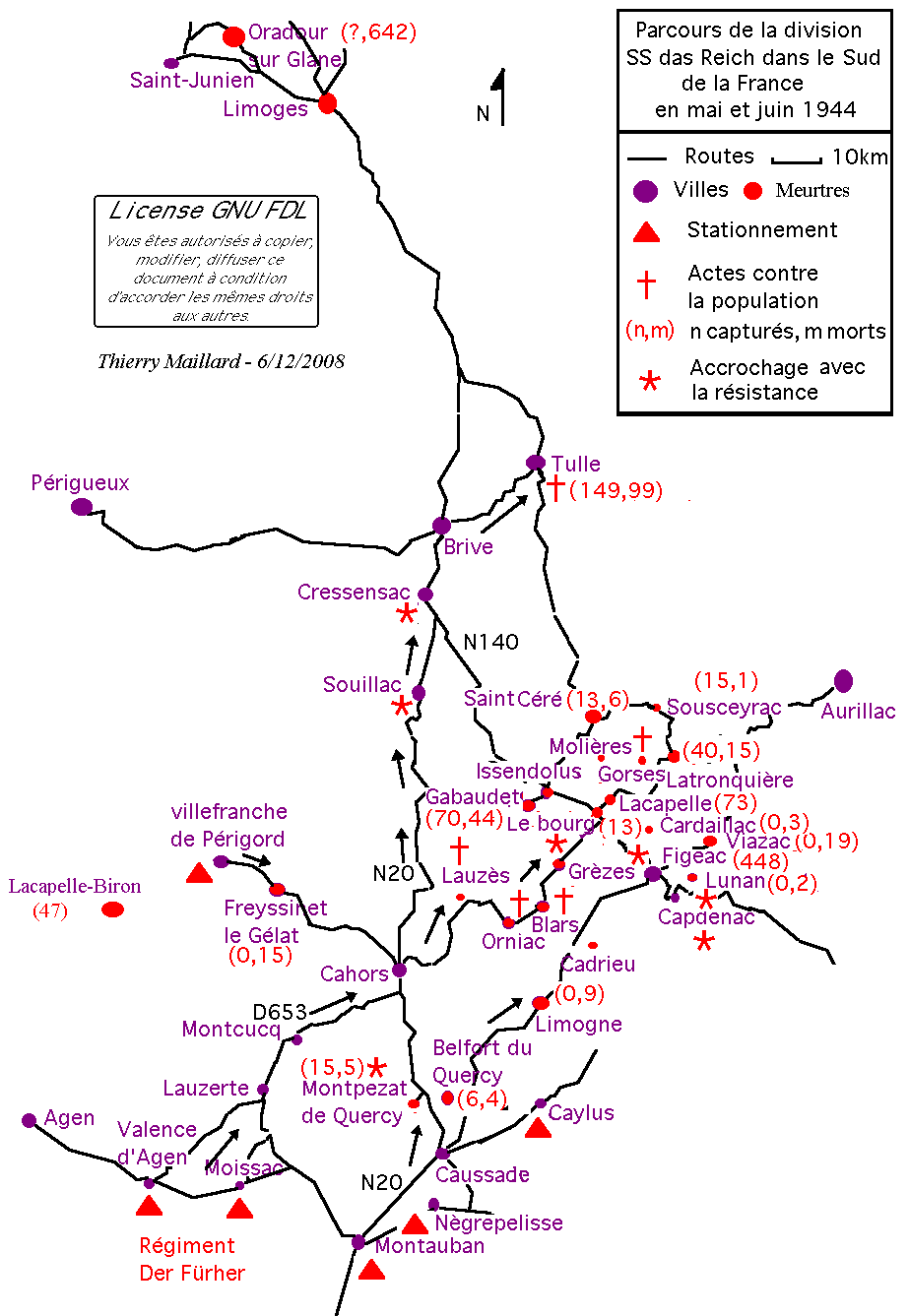
Route of the 2nd Panzer Division in May and June 1944

The order to engage the partisans was known as the Sperrle Ordinance, after the Deputy High Commander of the Western Front. By those orders, the division was to immediately attack the "terrorists" at any opportunity and that if any civilians were killed, it would be regrettable, but would be the responsibility of the "terrorists" and not their own. The orders also called for the area to be secured along with all inhabitants, and that any house used by the resistance or its supporters, regardless of its owner, was to be burned. The orders of the commander of the division mentioned certain precise tactics: "The resistance must be wiped out by outflanking them." On 5 June 1944, SS general Lammerding approved the use of repressive measures implemented in Eastern Europe in the suppression of the Maquis. His program included provisions such as use of counter-propaganda and discrimination, and other actions intended to "turn the public against the terrorists." It approved mass arrests, occupation of important localities, and the commandeering of vehicles. It also read that "For every German wounded or killed, we will kill ten terrorists." The order's overarching goal was to separate the resistance fighters from the rest of French citizens and turn the public against them.

Between early May and 9 June, the division, particularly the regiment Der Führer, conducted a widespread search for supporters of the resistance as well as several anti-partisan operations. During these operations, sixty partisans were killed and twenty were deported to labor camps. An estimated one hundred civilians were killed in a variety of circumstances, while hundreds of houses were burned.

=== German crackdown in Corrèze ===
Given the activity of the Resistance in the region, the department of Corrèze and in particular the town of Tulle and its surroundings were the object of frequent interventions by German Security Services. In 1944, a 12-member SD unit under August Meier, the Commandant of the Secret Police and Security Services in Limoges, (Note: Former commandant of the Einsatzkommandos 5, and then 4b of the Einsatzgruppe C) arrived in Tulle. Directed by the SS-Hauptsturmführer Friedrich Korten, these men, along with elements of the North African Legion under the command of Henri Lafont, mounted a crackdown on the Maquis.

In collaboration with a division cobbled together under the command of Major General Walter Brehmer, they systematically swept the region during April 1944. This temporarily united composite units, including notably the 1st Regiment of the 325th Security Division and the Georgians of the 799th Infantry Battalion, recruited from Red Army prisoners of war. From 1 to 7 April 1944, the Brehmer division arrested 3000 people; in the village of Le Lonzac, 17 inhabitants were killed and 24 houses burned; in Brive, 300 people were arrested and deported to work camps in Germany. In total, the operations against the Resistance by the Brehmer division were responsible for 1,500 arrests, 55 shootings, 128 crimes or offenses in 92 localities and 200 Jews murdered, but no direct confrontation with the Maquis. The Brehmer division left Corrèze in May, after having equally devastated the Dordogne and the Haute-Vienne. (Note: On the Brehmer division, see notably Kartheuser (2004), pp. 75–90) The crackdown partially explains the operations in Tulle by the Resistance, which hoped to end the suffering of the population.

== Battle of Tulle ==
=== Liberation ===
Resistance operations in Tulle were planned by the commander of the Maquis FTP of Corrèze, Jacques Chapou, known as Kléber, in mid April (Note: A first meeting was held on 17 April, according to Fouché & Beaubatie (2008), p. 41) or at the beginning of May 1944: "Originally, it seems the attack was planned with no connection to the landing, the date of which was still unpredictable." It had several objectives: "disarm, and if possible, destroy the German defenses; disarm the mobile reserve groups and appropriate for themselves their weapons and vehicles; render inoffensive the French Militia [Milice the Vichy French militia] and known collaborators", but also, "to open gaps in the defense, to inspire a healthy fear of its leaders and get them to retreat into Tulle and be unwilling to leave, stopping them, at least for a time, from continuing their efforts against the Maquis." When contacted, officials of the French Armée secrète Resistance indicated they were totally opposed to operations against an urban centre.

According to J. Delarue, Tulle was defended by a garrison of seven hundred men of the 3rd battalion of the 95th Security Regiment of the Wehrmacht, which had to be supplemented by six or seven hundred men of the Mobile Reserve Group and the Milice; B. Kartheuser estimates that the staff of the 95th Security Regiment included 289 men coming from the 8th and 13th companies and from the general staff, on the basis of detailed records drawn up on 17 May. Facing them, the resistance had 1350 fighters, of which 450 did not participate in launching or supporting the attack. For Jean-Jacques Fouché and Gilbert Beaubatie, the forces involved numbered just over three hundred men on the German side, the attack being launched by four hundred FTP who were joined by one hundred and fifty additional fighters between the middle of the afternoon on the 7th and the morning of the 8th.

The offensive began on 7 June 1944 at 05:00 with a bazooka shot on the security forces' barracks at Champ de Mars serving as the signal to begin the attack. By 06:00, the buildings used to house the German garrison were identified; the post office and the town hall, where the FTP established their command posts, were secured by 07:00. At 08:00, the train station was also taken by the Resistance, who found there only eighteen watchmen and one employee of the railway, Abel Leblanc; invited to join the Maquis, they decided instead to await the end of the fighting in the station waiting room. At 11:30, the forces of the Milice and the Mobile Reserve Group hoisted a white flag on the barracks of the Champs de Mars and, following negotiations, they left the town around 16:00 carrying all their gear. For Elie Dupuy, whose FTP battle group was not affected by the order to fall back to Chapou, this departure was a failure of one of the operation's goals of recovering war material and transport from the security forces; but with his single battalion of only 90 men, he could not afford "to continue the attack against the German garrison, and at the same time, impose unconditional surrender on the security forces".

Meanwhile, around 13:30, German forces took advantage of a partial withdrawal of the Maquis from the hills around Tulle that had been ordered by Chapou and briefly regained control of the train station where they found the watchmen wearing white armbands, part of their work uniform but also bearing some resemblance to those worn by the FTP. The watchmen were taken from the building and, without any questioning and without being searched, they were shot by German troops in the station courtyard or along the tracks leading to the regional railway engine house, cut down "in the crossfire, including of a machine gun shooting them in the back as they pleaded with the Germans, shouting 'Comrades! Comrades!'". Only Leblanc survived the shootout. According to B. Kartheuser, it was deliberate murder, the Germans being aware of the presence of the watchmen and knowing their attire.

In the night between 7 and 8 June, according to the Maquis fighters, still without the 450 fighters of their A group, withdrew to the hills around the town and the German forces regrouped in three places: the girls' school in the north, the weapons factory and the Souilhac school in the south. Fighting resumed at 06:30, the main offensive being against the girls' school, the main stronghold of German troops. In the face of German opposition, the FTP set fire to the building around 15:00. Around 17:00, in circumstances that remain unclear and disputed, the Germans tried to leave, if one of them was waving a white cloth, (Note: This detail is not mentioned by Trouillé who describes instead that the Germans tried to force an escape with volleys of machine gun fire and grenades Trouillé (1968), p. 152.) others were carrying live grenades. In all the confusion, the Maquis opened fire with automatic weapons; some soldiers were cut down at close range, by exploding grenades, and this explains the injuries observed on the horribly mutilated corpses. After the surrender of German troops, nine members of the SD were identified with the help of thirty liberated Maquis fighters, taken to the graveyard and shot without trial. Fighting ceased from that moment, the Resistance merely maintaining circles around the weapons factory and Souilhac school which they planned to attack the following day. While the German and French wounded were taken to the hospital. Kléber went to the prefecture and asked the prefect, Trouillé, to continue to provide leadership of the civil administration. For the Resistance, with the exemption of two small holdouts to be taken the next day, Tulle was liberated.

German losses were estimated by Sarah Farmer as 37 dead, 25 wounded and 35 missing. For G. Penaud, they amount to about 50 dead, sixty missing, probably taken prisoner, and between 23 and 37 wounded. The majority of the prisoners were probably shot thereafter, except for a handful of soldiers of Polish origin who agreed to join the Maquis.

=== Reoccupation ===
On 8 June at about 21:00, (Note: Unless otherwise stated, this section is written on the basis of Delarue (1993), pp. 358–365) the first tanks of the 2nd SS Panzer Division arrived in Tulle from three different directions, surprising the Maquis. The positions of the Armée secrète and the FTP outside the city had been swept away by the tanks, all warnings having failed to reach Tulle in time. The Maquis fighters immediately fled the city for the hills without a fight but faced "a relief column [...] [which] included heavy elements and had considerable fire-power": it is possible that bazooka fire from the plateaus around Tulle could have inflicted losses on elements of Das Reich, but the Resistance gave up on that option for fear of causing heavy casualties among the civilian population. The SS established their first command post in the district of Souilhac near the weapons factory, before moving the next day in the late morning to the Hotel Moderne. At this time, the highest-ranking officer of the SS was Sturmbannführer Kowatsch, an intelligence officer from the division headquarters. Throughout the night of 8 June, the SS patrolled in town and encircled it.

On 9 June, at 06:00, the Germans searched the prefecture and threatened to execute the prefect, Trouillé, after finding weapons and ammunition abandoned there by the Mobile Reserve Group. He was to be shot by the most senior SS officer present, a sergeant, but escaped execution by arguing that his position afforded him a rank equivalent to that of a general and demanded to speak to a more senior officer before being shot. He managed to get an audience with a senior officer who had come to visit the German wounded being treated at the hospital. During the visit, a wounded German confirmed to the officer that the prefect had prevented a resistance fighter from shooting them: "This man saved our lives."

== Massacre ==
=== Mass arrests ===
Residents of Tulle, you have followed my instructions and remained calm in exemplary fashion during the difficult days that your city has just gone through. I thank you. This attitude, and the protection of wounded German soldiers were the two things that enabled me to obtain assurances from the German command that normal life will resume within the day.

– Proclamation of Prefect Pierre Trouillé, broadcast by loudspeaker on 9 June 1944 at 10 o'clock in the morning.

On 9 June, between 09:00 and 10:00, SS-Sturmbannführer Aurel Kowatsch declared to Prefect Trouillé and the secretary general of the prefecture, M. Roche: "Your gesture [care of wounded Germans] will not be ignored by the German commander who will take this into account in favor of the population in the inevitable crackdown following the crime committed against our comrades of the Tulle garrison." He told them that the mass arrests had already begun, detaining all men between the ages of sixteen and sixty and authorizing only "the release of all essential elements after verification of their loyalties."

According to Trouillé and Roche, Kowatsch took his orders directly from General Heinz Lammerding, presumably by radio. The mass arrests affected a population already distraught from the battle: "In small groups, the SS scoured the homes and the streets; they entered lodgings, examined the men that they found there; to the women, they claimed that it was an identity check, that the absence of their husband, sons or brothers would not last long so not to bother packing supplies". "We were led by the SS down to the docks of Rigny. [...] A larger group joined ours. [...] We slowly approached Souilhac: the half-tracks, the tanks in good order, parked along the sidewalks. [...] Our group joined with others; other groups joined with ours; and as concern grew, our hands started to shake. [...] We walked with heads high, the better to hide our anxiety". (Note: Jacques-Louis Bourdelle, Départs – Récits, Rougerie, s. l., s. d., p. 28) The members of the [French paramilitary] Chantiers de jeunesse were gathered in the barracks of the Enfants de troupe and taken away to the weapons factory. In total, close to five thousand men and boys were assembled in front of the weapons factory.

=== Selection ===
In accordance with the agreement with Kowatsch that authorized the release of those essential to the resumption of normal activity in the city, French officials went to the arms factory to negotiate who among those rounded up would be counted among these. "It was soon noticed that the mayor (Colonel Bouty) was accompanied by several people, department heads, the director of industrial energy, the stationmaster, and other staff with their large gold caps, the school inspector—among us—but these gentlemen stood up there on the road with the German officers... it smelled of collaboration." The representatives of the French government obtained the release of 3,500 of the 5,000 men and young people. Among them, employees of the State and of the prefecture, of the mayor's office, of the Post, Telegraph, and Telephone company, of the gas company, of the water company, financiers and holiday camp workers, electricians, foremen and supervisors of the factory in La Marque and of the weapons factory, bakers, grocers, gardeners, and doctors... but neither dentists nor teachers. "This first part of the selection of the hostages had been designed by the SS to undermine local authority; when questioned in 1962 Lammerding said that the mayor pointed out the Resistance fighters." Among those tortured there were certainly some members of the Resistance, including Pierre Souletie and his brother-in-law, Lucien Ganne.

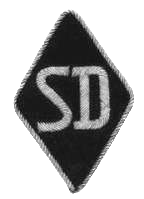
Insignia of the SD, sewn to the bottom of the left sleeve of the SS uniforms

After the intervention of the French authorities, a second selection of the hostages was made, this time by the Germans themselves. The main person responsible for this second selection was the spokesman of the SD unit, Walter Schmald, who had survived the fighting of the previous two days. Though Schmald without a doubt did not act alone and was likely assisted in this selection by other members of the SD units stationed in Limoges, his presence and his actions struck all the witnesses, for whom Schmald was emblematic of the victim selection process. Alongside Schmald, known as "the hunchback" or "the Jackal", was Paula Geissler, spokesperson for the Wehrmacht attached to the director of the arms factory, nicknamed "the bitch", who was also involved in sorting and release of sixteen or seventeen hostages, engineers from the factory or men that she knew, such as the son of the pharmacist. (Note: She visited him in 1978 during a stay in Tulle "on holiday", which triggered strong protests. Fouché & Beaubatie (2008), pp. 278–279.)

Father Jean Espinasse, arrested at his home around 09:30, described Schmald as "a German wearing a shabby old coat, without stripes or insignia of any kind, bareheaded, with an air of fatigue" and recalled that Schmald addressed him "in excellent French", saying: "I am one of four survivors of the battle yesterday. [...] We were almost all Rhenish Catholic. We would like to have a priest to attend to us." Antoine Soulier described Schmald as having long blond hair with tan highlights swept back, clean-shaven, a dark complexion, about 30 years old, his eyes always squinting half-shut in order to see better, and most of all the right half of his upper lip was always raised in a venomous sneer.

The remaining hostages were divided into three groups of different size and composition as the selection gradually ended up creating two groups of sixty men, suspected, according to Schmald, of participation in the Resistance based on factors like being unshaven or wearing shoes that weren't polished. According to H. Espinasse, even though Schmald asked for verification of some identity cards, he judged people based on their appearance and, for no apparent reason, sent them to join the small group on his left [the future victims]. According to Trouillé, "the three groups were constantly changing, either by the interplay of releases, or by the choice of some of the S.S. with Walter, the darkly unfathomable Walter". Schmald sought to maintain the number of 120 men destined for execution, though this number had not yet been announced: when various interventions resulted in the release of one man, Schmald selected a replacement from the main group: "To save a friend, you would condemn another man with the same stroke, and which one was unknown [...] with the result that only the most vulnerable, the loners, the weakest or the luckless, those with no one to defend them, were left to the hands of the executioner". This process led to the following reflection by one of the survivors, Jean-Louis Bourdelle: "I was dismayed to learn that the French and the Germans took pride in having freed some hostages, it seems these wretches didn't realize that in doing so they had thus admitted their part in the executions. I remember how terrified my friends and I were after each release, Lieutenant Walter would approach our group and make a new choice to complete the group of future victims". (Note: J.L. Bourdelle, cited by Fouché & Beaubatie (2008), p. 159) According to Lammerding's note of 5 June and the order given by him at the end of the morning of 9 June, these 120 men were condemned to death by hanging.

=== Hangings ===
Forty German soldiers were murdered in the most horrible manner by a band of communists. [...] For the guerillas and those who helped them, there is a punishment, execution by hanging. [...] Forty German soldiers were murdered by the guerrillas, one hundred and twenty guerrillas and their accomplices will be hanged. Their bodies will be thrown in the river

– Poster signed by the commanding General of the German troops, posted in Tulle.

Around 15:30, (Note: Unless otherwise stated, this section is based on Delarue (1993), pp. 382–394.) in response to a last-minute plea from the prefect that the executions not be carried out by hanging, Kowatsch responded that "we have developed on the Russian Front the practice of hanging. We have hanged over a hundred thousand men in Kharkov and in Kiev, this is nothing to us". (Note: "Je regrette, nous avons pris en Russie l'habitude de pendre, nous avons pendu plus de cent mille hommes à Kharkov et à Kiev, ce n'est rien pour nous." (Trouillé 1968:174)) He asked Colonel Bouty, president of the special delegation, to report to the main group of prisoners that they would be required to attend the executions. Before they were led to the square in Souilhac, Bouty told them: "I have some very painful news to tell you: you are going to witness the execution. I ask you to remain calm. Do not make a move, do not say a word". On their arrival, the prisoners discovered, over many hundreds of meters, nooses hung from trees, lampposts, and balconies. The preparations had been made, by the end of the morning, by the SS-Hauptsturmführer Hoff, head of a pioneer section, all of whom had volunteered to perform hangings.

The victims selected for hanging were led in groups of ten to the place of their execution. "Each of them was soon led to the foot of a ladder in the hands of two executioners. Two SS stood by each noose; one of them then climbed the steps of the ladder or stepladder with the condemned. Once he reached the desired height, he put the noose on the prisoner, held him, and then the other SS brutally removed the prisoner's stepladder". In certain cases, the executioners, all volunteers, hung from the legs of the victim, struck them or finished them off with a submachine gun or a pistol. "Sometimes, to speed up the execution, the barbarians would shove their victims with rifle butts and with terrible screams kick their stepladder over". (Note: Testimony by Colonel Bouty, cited in Trouillé (1968), p. 176) As a result of the intervention of Colonel Bouty on behalf of a German officer, Father Espinasse was authorized to offer his ministry to those who would die. He attended the first executions. During that of the first group, "in one case [...], the victim, badly hung without a doubt, was wracked by spasms; then I saw the soldier who had removed his ladder used it to hit the tortured man until he stopped moving completely". After that, he noted that "the execution squad forced the condemned to walk, and not without violence; I can still see the soldier, in a fit of rage, breaking the butt of his rifle on the back of a victim who had frozen in horror at the sight of the noose". "Can we imagine the scene? Of men assembled under duress, of soldiers below the gallows, of groups of hostages led to their deaths, and the silence". Throughout the operation, Paula Geissler and a group of SS watched the hangings while downing bottles of good wine on the terrace of the Café Tivoli, listening to music on a gramophone.

=== 99 victims ===
Why were the executions stopped at 99 victims? [...] 99 is an incomprehensible figure that cannot be explained. With its absence of significance, the number of victims remains a mystery.

– Jean-Jacques Fouché et Gilbert Beaubatie.

In successive versions of his account, Father Espinasse attributes to himself alone the credit for having stopped the hangings. According to him, while nine groups, or 90 men, had already been hanged, and after being brought back into the courtyard of the weapons factory after the murder of 20 or 30 citizens of Tulle, he found that the tenth group included 13 men. He intervened with Walter Schmald and obtained not only that four men would be removed from the group, but also that this would be the last march to the noose and thus the number of victims was 99. (Note: According to Élie Constans, Philomène Joutet, captured by elements of the 2nd SS Panzer Division Das Reich during the Massacre of Gabaudet in Issendolus and whose son and daughter had been killed the day before, had had the noose placed on his neck but was not yet hanged; he was part of the hostages freed (Constans 1994, pp. 52–53).)

This version, repeated by many authors, is challenged by Bruno Kartheuser who finds the story inconsistent and implausible. Kartheuser first points out that the decisive intervention that is attributed to Espinasse is not confirmed by any witness, though several hundred people were gathered in the courtyard of the factory at that time; this intervention is not mentioned in the declaration made in 1948 by the president of the special delegation from Tulle, Colonel Bouty, that attributed the interventions and rescues to the director of the Brandt facility Factory at la Marque, Henry Vogel, Deputy Director of Weapons Manufacture in Tulle, Laborie and Chief Engineer of Roads and Bridges, Lajugie. (Note: An Alsatian hostage was released on the intervention of a member of the "Das Reich", Elimar (Sadi) Schneid. Kartheuser (2004), p. 449.) Nor does Trouillé attribute the saving of the three men to the Father, "Vogel debated splendidly with the SS officers to free some of his workers condemned to this torture […]. In this way, he earned four pardons and allowed the Deputy Director of the weapons factory, Laborie, to claim and remove these men; Lajugie, Chief Engineer in the region further argued exhaustively to save an engineer in his service but his efforts were in vain". The "decisive intervention" of Espinasse is also not mentioned in the citation for the award of the Médaille d'argent from the French Red Cross to the father in 1945 which was awarded on the basis of his priestly merits and his material assistance he had given to those executed. Finally, for Kartheuser, given the strict hierarchy in place in the SS, it is not possible that Schmald could have made the decision to stop the executions because they had been ordered by Lammerding (who said after the war that it was on his order that the hangings were stopped before the predetermined 120 victims), that the hangings were supervised by Kowatsch and that one of Schmald's superiors in the SD (either Korten or Butsch) was present at the time.

For J.J. Fouché and G. Beaubatie, "the number of 99 victims was the consequence of an accumulation of material facts independent of each other [...] But more than the number, the staging of the hangings would reinforce the terror for a long time. The efficacy was not related to a specific figure, but much more, the staging of a spectacle of violence designed to humiliate the men."

The bodies of the executed were taken down at the beginning of the evening by the members of the Chantiers de Jeunesse, under the orders of men of the 4th Company of the battalion of scouts; despite the intervention of local authorities, they were buried on the site of a garbage dump in Cueille, without any effort at identification, and with only a brief impromptu ceremony that was cut short by the Germans, during which Espinasse, in the presence of the uniformed prefect and his cabinet director, blessed the bodies.

=== Deportations ===
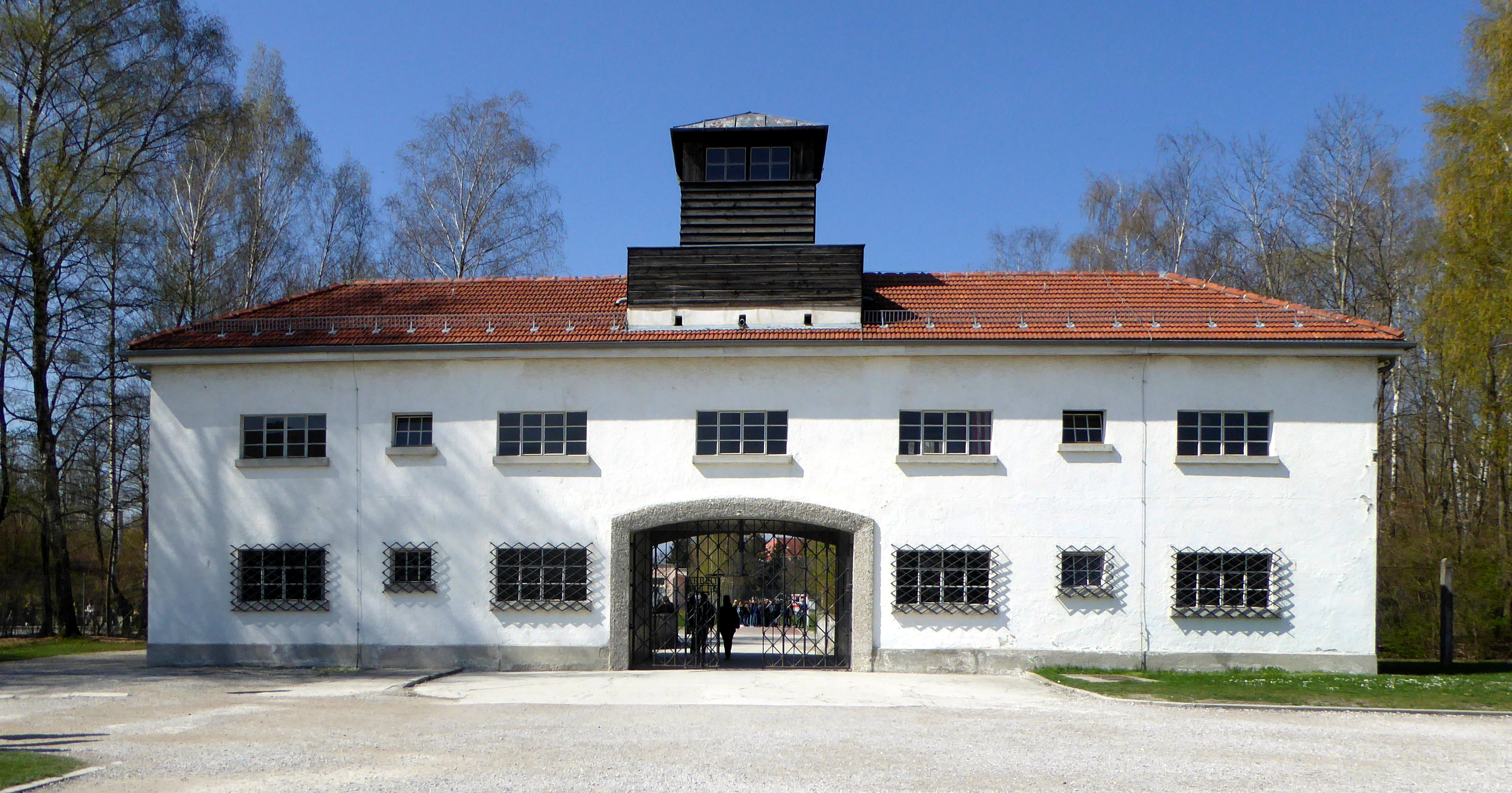
Dachau Concentration Camp main entrance building

On 10 June, the hostages remaining at the weapons factory in Tulle were treated in the same manner as in the selection of the hanging victims the previous day: negotiations between members of the 2nd SS Panzer Division Das Reich and the SD, including Schmald, and the French authorities, divided them into groups destined for deportation and those who would be pardoned by interventions. (Note: According to B. Kartheuser, who is the only one to mention this hypothesis, certain hostages were saved by the action of Doctor Pouget and the Arnal Hospital, who administered injections that could cause an immediate fever and then evacuated the victims on stretchers as patients) 311 men and 660 young members of the Chantiers de Jeunesse were transferred from Tulle to Limoges. After a new selection, in which members of the Milice played an essential role, 162 men and all the members of the Chantiers de Jeunesse were freed; 149 of the remaining prisoners were transferred to Poitiers, then on to Compiègne, and from there they were taken to Dachau concentration camp on 2 July; 101 would not survive.

On 11 or 12 June, the 2nd SS Panzer Division began moving north to the Normandy front. With the massacres at Tulle and Oradour-sur-Glane and other killings, it had killed 4000 people, including many civilians.

Repression continued in Tulle in the weeks following the hangings. From 11 June to 31 July, the laboratory of the weapons factory was used as a centre of torture, where the Milice cooperated with Schmald. On 21 June, Trouillé saw there three militiamen no older than 20 pour acid on the facial wounds of a man they had just beaten with a blackjack. Tulle also endured another raid on 21 June, following which 80 men were sent for forced labor in Austria. The German troops in Corrèze departed on 16 August 1944.

On 12 June in a forest area called Le Vert near Meymac east of Tulle, FTP partisans executed 47 German prisoners and a collaborator captured in Tulle.

In total, the crimes of the Wehrmacht, of the Waffen-SS and of the SD had claimed 218 civilian victims in Tulle. "Somehow, the SS General had achieved his goal: the discrimination of the Resistance and the terror of the population."

== Analysis ==
=== Historical research ===
The public proclamations and explanations given by the Germans to the French authorities reliably refer to the potential for the murder of unarmed German soldiers. According to the German argument, reprisals conformed with international military law, under the Armistice of 22 June 1940 and under the second Hague Convention. Following the trial conducted in Belgium on the execution of hostages by German troops and one conducted in Italy for the Ardeatine massacre, one can conclude that the Tulle massacre violated the law of armed conflict., notably of articles 40, 41, 46 and 50 of the annexation regulation to the 4th Hague convention of 1907 concerning the laws and customs of war on land as well as the "Martens Clause" of the preamble of that convention. (Note: Reprisals are not explicitly forbidden by the 4 Geneva Conventions of 1949 under the protection of victims of war.) Meanwhile, Bruno Kertheuser contests the use of the term "reprisals" in the Tulle case: "the death and deportation of hundreds of inhabitants of Tulle on the 9th and 10th of June are very clearly a war crime. Any other name, like that of reprisals, is a white-washing, an absolving measure, belonging to the jargon of perpetrators of these crimes and participants in their logic with them."

The massacre at Tulle was carried out to punish a centre of the Resistance, in order to terrorize other regions, in accordance with the established practices of the Wehrmacht and the Waffen-SS on the Eastern Front; it resulted "from the action and the inaction of many people", be they members of the Wehrmacht, the Waffen-SS or the SD.

=== Revisionism ===
According to the self-published accounts of the SS-Sturmbannführer Otto Weidinger, many dozen German soldiers were killed after their surrender and numerous cadavers bore evidence of mutilation. (Note: Otto Weidinger, Tulle et Oradour, une tragédie franco-allemande) This thesis is repeated and amplified by two other revisionists, Sadi Schneid, pseudonym of former Waffen-SS member Elimar Schneider, and Herbert Taege, former official of the Hitler Youth.

For these historians, the account of Weidinger has no merit. Eberhard Jaeckel "doubts the veracity of these claims and asks whether the alleged atrocities were not used to justify the behavior of the SS." For G. Penaud, "various testimonies of military or civilian Germans found by Bruno Kartheuser are somewhat contradictory on the question of "mutilations" of victims, according to the rumor, German victims; to tell the truth, reading subsequent declarations from the SS, he did not find one that made direct mention of these atrocities: those who expressed this criticism [...] peddled it indirectly from the statements of witnesses which seem difficult to afford credibility. "

Kartheuser refuted point by point these revisionist theses. The only fact was that it was contrary to articles 23c and 23d of the Annex of the Hague Convention of 1907 concerning the laws and customs of war on land that state "It is especially prohibited [..] To kill or wound an enemy who, having laid down arms, or having no longer means of defence, has surrendered at discretion", that nine members of the SD and Gestapo were executed without trial on the afternoon of 8 June. As for the claimed mutilations, it was only traces of machine gun shots. According to a witness, Robert Lajugie, "from the surrender of the besieged, I saw the bodies of the victims. Some certainly were damaged and it is true that there were some fractured skulls and exposed brain matter, but that was the result of a concentration of automatic gunfire. […] It is in this state that elements of the 2nd SS Panzer Division Das Reich found their compatriots with, in addition, the further damage from the carting off of the bodies by the arrivals, berserk as they were, using tools which could crush the bodies or heads." This story is confirmed by Dr Heinz Schmidt, doctor to the 3rd battalion of the 95th Security Regiment: "Because we wanted to have a presentable justification for our reprisals, I was cited as the physician in the square along with the Chief Doctor of the Das Reich division. He asked me if I had seen the mutilations of the bodies of our fallen soldiers in the town. Contrary to claims that this was the case, I stated emphatically that I had not seen any mutilation on the sixty dead that I saw."

According to the book by Schneid, Kartheuser wrote that he "assigns, in the most heavy-handed manner of all versions that circulated, sufficient blame for the deliberate mutilations carried out on some German corpses. Schneider does not mention seeing this. […] He only peddles a version that was widespread in the early days in the SS and Nazi circles of the time and also in official propaganda." He remarks equally that neither Weidinger nor Taege's accounts are based on any direct witnesses.

== Aftermath ==
Walter Schmald, of the SiPo-SD, was captured by Resistance fighters at Brive on 15 August 1944, and was executed by them without trial on 22 August. (Note: Unless otherwise noted, this section is based on Penaud (2005), pp. 491–499)

Otto Weidinger, the last commander of the regiment Der Führer, was interrogated on the subject of the massacre during his detention from 1947 to 1951. He was prosecuted for his voluntary support for the Waffen-SS, considered a criminal organization according to the Nuremberg trials, and was acquitted. After his release, he wrote numerous books on the 2nd SS Panzer Division Das Reich, considered in France to be revisionist.

The first investigation, which covered the killing of the 18 watchmen at the train station, was closed on 25 March 1948, having established the basis for the trial which opened in Bordeaux on 29 March 1949, which found ten members of the 95th Security Regiment guilty of those murders under the orders of Captain Franz Reichmann, commander of the 3rd Battalion. The three accused officers were sentenced to 15 (Franz Reichmann, Willi Schlewski) or 10 (Jean Retzer) years of hard labour; four of the accused were found guilty but were later released on the basis that they had acted under orders, and three were acquitted. Schlewski and Retzer were released on 18 September 1952 and Reichmann was released on 25 January 1953.

The judicial inquiry on the hangings at Tulle, which opened on 18 June 1947, led notably to a provisional report by Commissioner of Police Félix Hugonnaud, which concluded that the hangings were apparently ordered by Lammerding, as a result of which three arrest warrants were issued. The trial (case against Kahn et al. Hangings in Tulle) opened in Bordeaux on 4 July 1951 and the verdict was pronounced the following day. Only five people stood accused: four officers of the Das Reich division – Lammerding, Aurel Kowatsch, division Chief of Staff Otto Hoff, Commandant of the section of pioneers and a German employee of the weapons factory in Tulle, Paula Geissler. The latter was accused of not saving an engineer of the factory, which she could have done without any personal risk. The tribunal declined to try hundreds of people, including the members of the execution squad who could easily have been included.

Lammerding and Kowatsch, the latter having died in March 1945 on the Eastern Front near the Hungarian border, were condemned to death in absentia; Hoff and Wulf received ten years of hard labour and Paula Geissler received three years in prison. After an appeal before the tribunal of Marseille, Hoff's sentence was reduced, on 27 May 1952, to five years, inclusive of time served. Hoff was released following the sentencing with his appeal. Wulf had been pardoned by French President Vincent Auriol and released in the week prior. After Lammerding was sentenced to death, the French government requested his extradition, alongside the British Occupying Forces, at the end of January 1953, and an arrest warrant was issued for Lammerding by the British High Commissioner on 27 February 1953 under law number 10 of the Allied Control Council. However, these garnered no response and Lammerding was not punished.

Until his death, Lammerding denied all responsibility for the massacre in Tulle, declaring instead that the initiative was taken by Kowatsch: "knowing the rigorous hierarchy and the terribly rigid discipline which reigned in the SS corps, such a statement is without merit.". After having equally denied, at a previous time, having been present in Tulle at all, he did change his story to confirm that he arrived there late in the afternoon, after the hangings; however the division's war diary for 10 June 1944 was written by Lammerding in Tulle and that dated 9 June first gave the time as 12:15, though this entry "was later overwritten to read 23:15." The presence of Lammerding in Tulle and its environs by noon on 9 June is equally attested to by the military doctor of the German garrison, Dr Schmidt.

Proceedings were opened against Lammerding by the Central Office of North Rhine-Westphalia in December 1961, in the course of which Lammerding was questioned in February 1962; on 9 October 1962, the director of the Central Office of the State Justice Administrations for the Investigation of National Socialist Crimes issued a stay of proceedings based solely on Lammerding's version of events.

It was not until the civil proceedings, brought in Düsseldorf by Lammerding, against the Communist weekly Die Tat, who had accused him in their 17 July 1965 edition of having been condemned to death in France for the murder of numerous hostages, that German courts established, though without real consequences, that Lammerding did bear responsibility in the massacre at Tulle. The legal findings quite clearly dismiss Lammerding's claims: "A group of 120 men, the bulk of them young, were selected, their group was reduced on the intervention of many French citizens of that village to number 99. These 99 were killed in a cruel manner, without trial and without having proved their participation in the partisan attack the day before. His [Lammerding's] assertion that the best part of the 99 killed were partisans and not hostages is inaccurate. [...] Here, the victims were killed in revenge for a partisan attack already committed and to discourage partisan attacks in the future. The killing of these civilians can rightly be called the murder of hostages since these killings are even more objectionable than the killing of true hostages."

A last attempt to bring Lammerding to justice was made following the publication of a book by Jacques Delarue, Trafics et crimes sous l'occupation, in 1968. The socialist Deputy-Mayor of Tulle, Montalat, asked on 11 October 1968, that the French government demand that the German government open proceedings in Germany against Lammerding and that it do so urgently as the first volume of a revisionist history of the Das Reich division had just been published (under the pen name of Otto Weidinger) in Germany. Like its predecessors, this request was not followed up. In 1971, Lammerding died of cancer at the age of 66.

In 2008, the French Senate adopted a draft law adapting French criminal law in line with that of the International Criminal Court. Among other changes, this adaptation limits the Statute of limitations on war crimes to 30 years (article 462-10). This text has aroused the indignation of the group "Maquis de Corrèze", headed by honorary member Pierre Pranchère, because its adoption amounted essentially to an amnesty for those responsible for the massacres at Tulle, Oradour-sur-Glane and Maillé.

== Historiography ==
Works devoted, in whole or in part, to the massacre at Tulle are relatively numerous, notably even if compared to the abundant bibliography concerning the massacre at Oradour-sur-Glane.

Two works have been written by hostages who survived the ordeal, Jean-Louis Bourdelle and Antoine Soulier. The book by Antoine Soulier is considered "one of the most accurate and the most poignant stories of the drama. The author, a teacher whose son was hanged, was one of the people most active in the reconstruction of the event and in finding those responsible."

The story of the Canon Jean Espinasse, cannot be ruled out, but "with increasing distance and successive editions, Canon Espinasse has accentuated more and more the priestly importance the event showcased for him and his memories become increasingly problematic as a historical source. The stories and the personality of Canon Espinasse have contributed the most to the creation of myths. " The role attributed to Father Espinasse since 1946 has been fundamentally questioned by Bruno Kartheuser. If the idea of the Christian Martyr was already present in the initial account ("These French heroes died in possession of the sacraments, that is to say with supernatural life ... one that death does not take away and which is more than the survival of the heroes to which, however, they were entitled.") in the 1979 version, the religious aspect took precedence over the facts: "as in the Gospel, future convicts were sent to the left," "in none of the condemned did I find the rejection of God or Jesus." Father Espinasse went on to mention the conversion before the hanging, "of a philosophy teacher with clearly Marxist ideas, materialists and even atheists […] who after an Our Father, walked without tears to the ropes lying in wait… to Life!" or one who had been pardoned at the last minute would have, had he not been spared, "been the only executed to carry the rosary."

It is also necessary to mention the article by Prefect Trouillé, "intended especially for the justification of his mandate [from the Vichy government in Tulle]." For Bruno Kartheuser, "it is difficult to decide to what extent this book can be used as a reliable historical source. The document is most accurate wherever the responsibilities of the prefect are least involved; there, however, where the liability of the prefect could be questioned, the recounting of events are more subjective."

The bulk of the works published between 1960 and 1990—Colonel Rémy (1963), Georges Beau et Léopold Gaubusseau (1969/1984), Henri Amouroux (1974), Marcel Meyssignac (1978) Max Hastings (1983), Henri Demay (1993), Jean Besse (1996)—"came from persons who experienced events only in part or that based their account on statements of third parties; they are characterized by the proven lack of knowledge or at least minimal, from German archives and documents" and "suffer from their patriotic commitment." Largely fictionalized, the book by Colonel Rémy, who did not witness the events, has become widespread and has been the main source of information about events in Tulle for numerous readers: "the desire of the author to provide a compelling story is embarrassing and casts doubt on the value of testimony." The work of Jacques Delarue, Trafics et crimes sous l'occupation (1968), like one on the l'Histoire de la Gestapo (1962), emerge from the lot: "both books are reference books for several reasons: they do not come from a local group involved in the events; they put the facts investigated at the centre of the story and they reach a consistent presentation of events in context." In 1971, came the first edition of the work "Maquis de Corrèze", written by a group of former members of the Francs-tireurs Resistance group. This first edition included neither the killing of the station guards nor the hangings, except for a brief allusion. These two episodes appear only in the 2nd (1988) or the 5th (1995) editions. According to J.J. Fouché and G. Beaubatie, that work, even though it is not without interest, is mostly a justification of the decisions of the FTP and of the French Communist Party.

The publication of Trafics et crimes sous l'occupation aroused strong reactions from former members of the Waffen-SS, orchestrated by Otto Weidinger, in concert with Heinz Lammerding and Albert Stückler. Notably, through German and French intermediaries, Otto Weidinger strongly influenced the writing of the book by Leopold Gaubusseau. The latter confirmed in a letter to Weidinger, dated 12 July 1968: "in France, communism is free. Its propaganda is powerful and scientific. […] In 1945, communist propaganda was using Tulle and Oradour to its benefit. It said: Das Reich, it is fascism, devastation, death." The servility of Gaubusseau is mentioned in a letter from Weidinger to Lammerding: "for Dr Gaubusseau, it was intended primarily to refute prominently the negative affirmations and distortions of Delarue. […] He asked me to submit to you a request to organize a joint meeting. […] Dr Gaubusseau is convinced that you are not responsible and would absolutely like to know you." One of the German intermediaries, Helmut Grützmacher, agreed with that opinion in writing: "It is touching in a way to see how it works to preserve the division "Das Reich" and Germany in these tragic events by making Schmald and thus the Sicherheitsdienst [SS] responsible." (Note: On this episode, see Kartheuser (2008), pp. 343 et seq.)

As for the German works of Herbert Taege, Sadi Schneid and Otto Weidinger, these "three Denialist works", "that disqualify the continuation of rhetoric of customary justification in post-war actions on the part of the accused and their lawyers ... are characterized by selectively treating facts and truth."

The history of the massacre of Tulle was revisited and deepened by the work in four volumes of Bruno Kartheuser, centered on the personality of Walter Schmald. Kartheuser's work is based on the critical examination of all sources French and German (archives, publications, judicial documents, oral histories), examining the events in context and without patriotism. The partition of the work into four volumes by Kartheuser, in 2008, coincided with that of the work of Jean-Jacques Fouché and Gilbert Beaubatie, which sheds new light on the events, notably highlighting the evidence of the poor state of the Das Reich division, which was no accident and the unpreparedness of the FTP for the offensive in Tulle, and the role these played in the repression. (Note: (in French) Jean-Macques Marie, Nouveaux regards et vieilles questions..., in La quinzaine littéraire, Paris, Sep 2008)

A street name in Tulle, "Rue du 9-Juin-1944", commemorates these events.

== See also ==
- Law of war
- Maquis du Limousin
- Maquis (World War II)
- Nazi Germany
- Vichy France
