= Oradour-sur-Glane massacre =

1944 mass killing by Nazi German soldiers in France

Coordinates: 45.9280°N 1.0410°E

- Part of the Nazi occupation of France
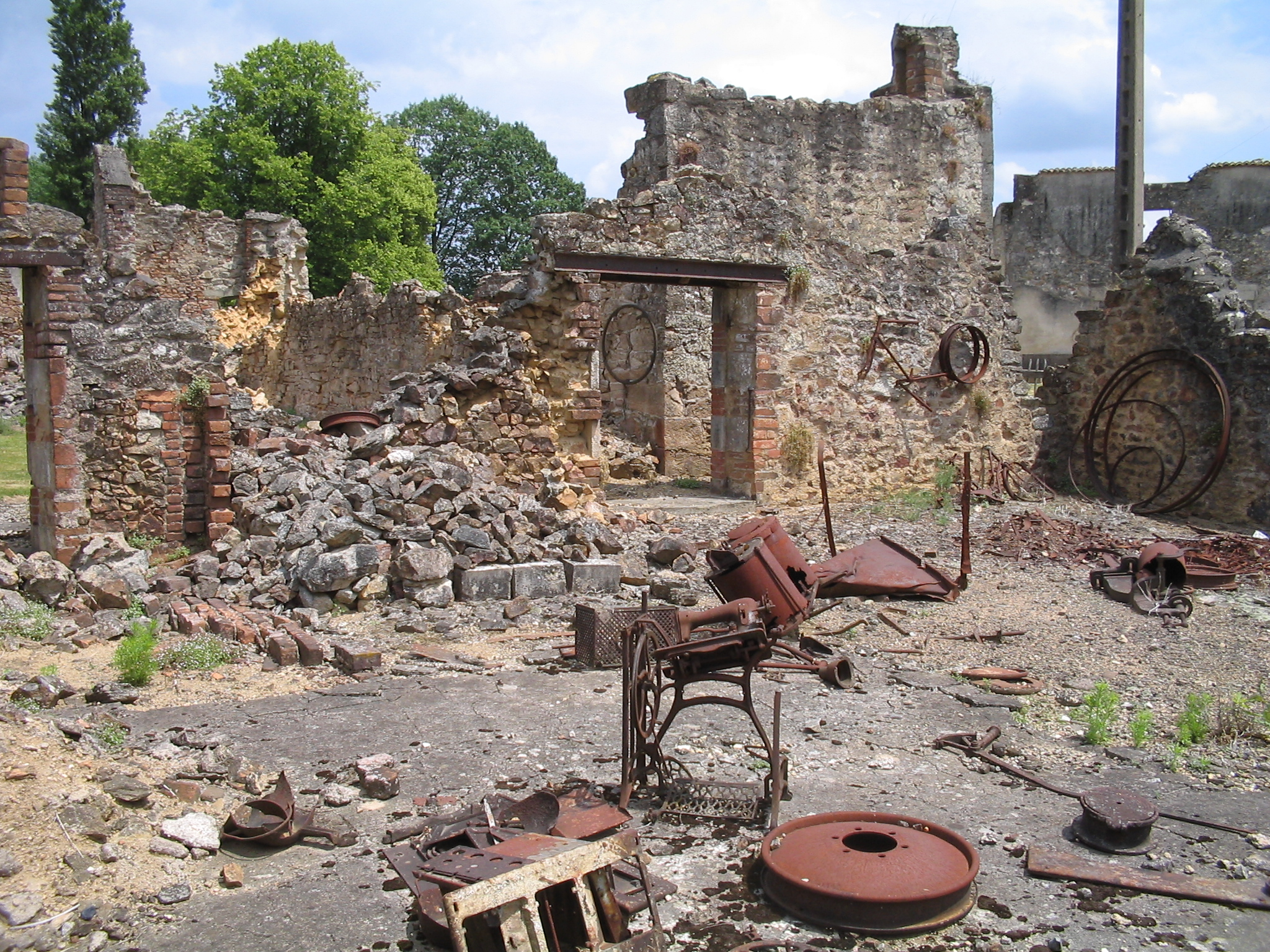
- Wrecked hardware – bicycles, sewing machines – left in the ruins of Oradour-sur-Glane
- Location: Oradour-sur-Glane, France
- Date: 10 June 1944
- Attack type: Mass murder, crime against humanity and war crime
- Deaths: 642 (190 men, 247 women and 205 children) killed
- Injuries: 1
- Victim: French civilians
- Perpetrators: Waffen-SS: Heinz Lammerding (2nd SS Panzer Division Das Reich); Sylvester Stadler (4th SS Panzergrenadier Regiment); Adolf Diekmann (1st Battalion, 4th SS Panzergrenadier Regiment)
- Motive: The kidnap and murder of Helmut Kämpfe (Reprisal)

Location of Oradour-sur-Glane in France

On 10 June 1944, four days after D-Day, the village of Oradour-sur-Glane in Haute-Vienne in Nazi-occupied France was destroyed when 642 civilians, including non-combatant men, women, and children, were massacred by a German Waffen-SS company. The execution was retribution in the form of collective punishment for Resistance activity in the area, including the capture and subsequent execution of Sturmbannführer Helmut Kämpfe, the 3rd Battalion commander of 4th SS Panzergrenadier Regiment, and a close friend of the 1st battalion commander of the same regiment, Waffen-SS Sturmbannführer Adolf Diekmann, who an informant incorrectly claimed had been burned alive in front of an audience. Both of them were battalion commanders in the 2nd SS Panzer Division Das Reich.

The Germans murdered everyone they found in the village at the time, as well as people brought in from the surrounding area. The death toll includes people who were merely passing by in the village at the time of the SS company's arrival. Men were brought into barns and sheds where they were shot in the legs and doused with petroleum before the barns were set on fire. Women and children were herded into a church that was set on fire; those who tried to escape through the windows were machine gunned. Extensive looting took place.

All in all, 642 people are recorded to have been murdered. The death toll includes 17 Spanish citizens, 8 Italians (a woman with 7 of her 9 children), and 3 Poles.

Only six people are known to have survived the massacre — five men and one woman. A seventh survivor was discovered later and murdered. The last living survivor, Robert Hébras, known for his activism for reconciliation between France, Germany, and Austria, died on 11 February 2023, aged 97. He was 18 years old at the time of the massacre.

The village was never rebuilt. A completely new village was built nearby after the war. President Charles de Gaulle ordered that the ruins of the old village be maintained as a permanent memorial and museum.

In 1983 SS-Untersturmfuhrer Heinz Barth became the first senior commander to face trial for the massacre, claiming before a judge that he was shocked that there were any survivors and that the decision was made to wipe the village from the face of the Earth, but there were survivors who were in attendance to see Barth sentenced to life imprisonment.

== Background ==
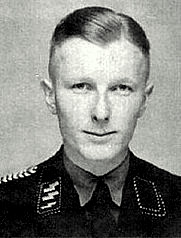
Adolf Diekmann, commander of the 1st Battalion, 4th SS Panzergrenadier Regiment

In February 1944, the 2nd SS Panzer Division Das Reich was stationed in the Southern French town of Valence-d'Agen, north of Toulouse, waiting to be resupplied with new equipment and fresh troops. Following the Normandy landings in June 1944, the division was ordered north to help stop the Allied advance. One of its units was the 4th SS Panzer Grenadier Regiment "Der Führer". Its staff included regimental commander SS-Standartenführer Sylvester Stadler, SS-Sturmbannführer Adolf Diekmann commanding the 1st Battalion and SS-Sturmbannführer Otto Weidinger, Stadler's designated successor who was with the regiment for familiarisation. Command passed to Weidinger on 14 June.

Early on the morning of 10 June 1944, Diekmann informed Weidinger that he had been approached by two members of the Milice, a paramilitary force of the Vichy regime. They claimed that a Waffen-SS officer was being held prisoner by the French Resistance in Oradour-sur-Vayres, a nearby village. The captured officer was claimed to be SS-Sturmbannführer Helmut Kämpfe, commander of the 2nd SS Panzer Reconnaissance Battalion (also part of the Das Reich division).

Kämpfe was captured on 9 June 1944 while traveling in a German army vehicle marked as an ambulance protected by the Geneva Convention4 km (2.5 mi) east of Saint-Léonard-de-Noblat by a group led by a Sergeant Jean Canou from Colonel Georges Guingouin's Brigade, a militant Communist group in the Maquis du Limousin. Canou handed him over to Guingouin. The following day Kämpfe was executed on the orders of Guingouin. According to a French informant Kämpfe was burned alive in front of an audience.

== Massacre ==
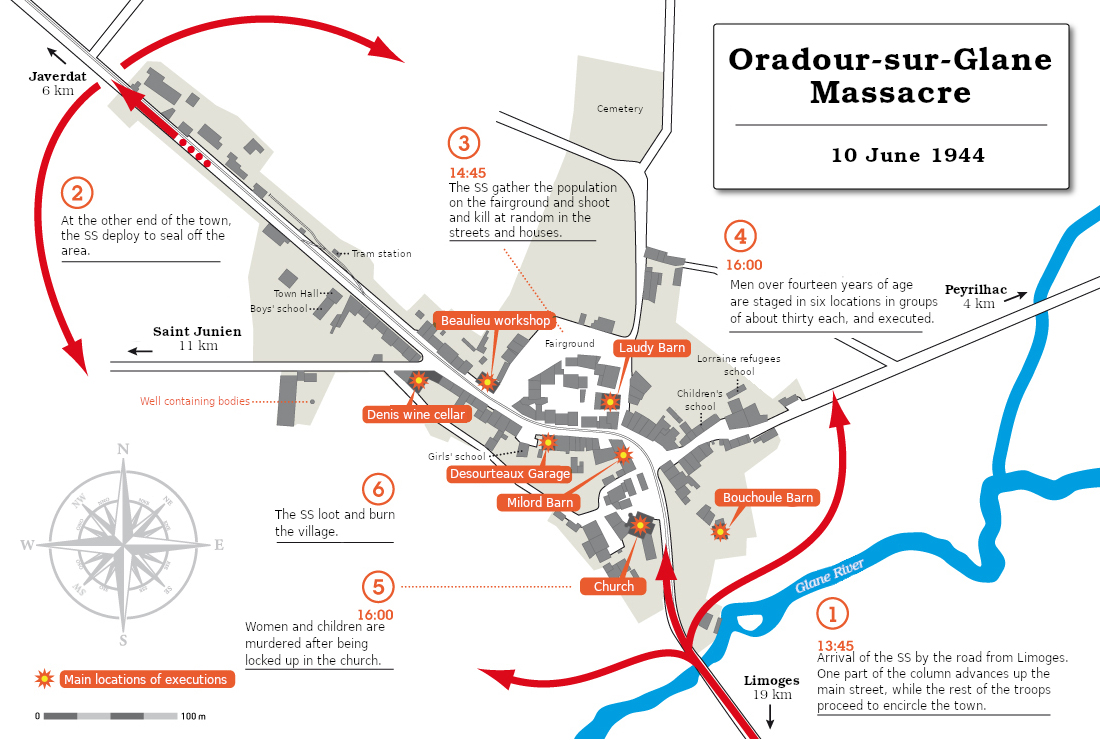
Sequence of events during the Oradour-sur-Glane massacre on 10 June 1944

On 10 June, Diekmann's battalion sealed off Oradour-sur-Glane and ordered everyone within to assemble in the village square to have their identity papers examined. This included six non-residents who happened to be bicycling through the village when the SS unit arrived. The women and children were locked in the church, and the village was looted. The men were led to six barns and sheds, where machine guns were already in place. According to a survivor's account, the SS men then began shooting, aiming for the victims' legs. When they were unable to move, the SS men covered them with fuel and set the barns on fire. Only five men and one woman managed to escape. A seventh initial survivor was later seen walking down a road and was shot dead. In all, 190 of the men died.

== Burning of women and children in the church ==
The SS men next proceeded to the church and placed an incendiary device beside it. When it was ignited, women and children tried to escape through the doors and windows, only to be met with machine-gun fire. 247 women and 205 children died in the attack. The only survivor was 47-year-old Marguerite Rouffanche. She escaped through a rear sacristy window, followed by a young woman and child. All three were shot, two of them fatally. Rouffanche crawled to some pea bushes and remained hidden overnight until she was found and rescued the next morning. About twenty villagers had fled Oradour-sur-Glane as soon as the SS unit had appeared. That night, the village was partially razed.

Several days later, the survivors were allowed to bury the 642 dead inhabitants of Oradour-sur-Glane who had been killed in just a few hours. Adolf Diekmann said the atrocity was in retaliation for the partisan activity in nearby Tulle and the kidnapping and murder of SS commander Helmut Kämpfe, who was burned alive in a field ambulance with other German soldiers.

Amongst the men of the town killed were three priests who worked in the parish. It was also reported that the SS troops desecrated the church, including deliberately scattering Communion hosts before they forced the women and children into it. The Bishop of Limoges visited the village in the days after the massacre, one of the first public figures to do so, and his account of what he witnessed is one of the earliest available. Amongst those who went to bury the dead and document the event by taking photographs were some local seminarians.

=== Murphy report ===
Escape and Evasion Report No. 866, Evasion in France, 2nd Lt. Raymond J. Murphy, Navigator, 324 Bomb Squadron, 91 Bomb Group (H), 15 August 1944

Raymond J. Murphy, a 20-year-old American B-17 navigator shot down over Avord, France in late April 1944, witnessed the aftermath of the massacre. After being hidden by the French Resistance, Murphy was flown to England on 6 August, and in debriefing filled in a questionnaire on 7 August and made several drafts of a formal report. The version finally submitted on 15 August has a handwritten addendum:

About 3 weeks ago, I saw a town within 4 hours bicycle ride up [sic] the Gerbeau farm [of Resistance leader Camille Gerbeau] where some 500 men, women, and children had been murdered by the Germans. I saw one baby who had been crucified.

Murphy's report was made public in 2011 after a Freedom of Information Act request by his grandson, an attorney in the United States Department of Justice National Security Division. It is the only account to mention crucifying a baby. Shane Harris concludes that the addendum is a true statement by Murphy and that the town, not named in Murphy's report, is very likely Oradour-sur-Glane.

== German response ==
Protests at Diekmann's unilateral action followed, both from Field Marshal Erwin Rommel, General Walter Gleiniger, German commander in Limoges, as well as the Vichy Government. The commander of the 4th SS Panzer Grenadier Regiment, SS-Standartenführer Sylvester Stadler ordered a court martial into the massacre at Oradour-sur-Glane. SS-Sturmbannführer Adolf Diekmann, the commander of the 1st Battalion, 4th SS Panzer Grenadier Regiment, and a personal friend of Kämpfe, was charged over the killings. He said he found Kämpfe's handcuffed body inside a German field ambulance with the remains of other German soldiers just outside the village of Oradour-sur-Glane. The vehicle had been set alight burning alive everyone inside. After seeing his friend's fate, the village was destroyed on his orders. SS-Brigadeführer Heinz Lammerding, Das Reich's division commander, agreed that Diekmann should face a court martial. All charges were dropped when Diekmann was killed fighting in Normandy on June 29, 1944.

== Postwar trials ==
On 12 January 1953, a military tribunal in Bordeaux heard the charges against the surviving 65 of the 200 or so SS men who had been involved. Only 21 of them were present, as many were in West and East Germany, which would not extradite them. Seven of those present for the charges were German citizens, but 14 were Alsatians, French nationals whose home region had been occupied by Germany in 1940 and later integrated into the German Reich. All but one of the Alsatians claimed to have been forced to join the Waffen-SS. Such forced conscripts from Alsace and Lorraine called themselves the malgré-nous, meaning "against our will".

On 11 February, 19 of the 20 defendants were convicted. Five received terms of imprisonment and two were executed. Continuing uproar in Alsace (including demands for autonomy) pressed the French parliament to pass an amnesty law for all the malgré-nous on 19 February. The convicted Alsatian former SS men were released shortly afterwards, which caused bitter protests in the Limousin region.

By 1958 the remaining German defendants had been released. General Heinz Lammerding of the Das Reich division, who had given the orders for retaliation against the Resistance, died in 1971, following a successful entrepreneurial career. At the time of the trial, he lived in Düsseldorf, in the former British occupation zone of West Germany, and the French government never obtained his extradition from West Germany.

The last trial of a Waffen-SS member who had been involved took place in 1983. Former SS-Obersturmführer Heinz Barth was tracked down in East Germany. Barth had participated in the massacre as a platoon leader in the "Der Führer" regiment, commanding 45 SS men. He was one of several charged with giving orders to shoot 20 men in a garage. Barth was sentenced to life imprisonment by the First Senate of the City Court of Berlin. He was released from prison in the reunified Germany in 1997 and died in August 2007.

On 8 January 2014, Werner Christukat, an 88-year-old former member of the 3rd Company of the 1st Battalion of the "Der Führer" regiment was charged, by the state court in Cologne, with 25 charges of murder and hundreds of counts of accessory to murder in connection with the massacre in Oradour-sur-Glane. The suspect, who was identified only as Werner C., had until 31 March 2014 to respond to the charges. If the case went to trial, it could have possibly been held in a juvenile court because the suspect was only 19 at the time it occurred. According to his attorney, Rainer Pohlen, the suspect acknowledged being at the village but denied being involved in any killings. On 9 December 2014, the court dropped the case, citing a lack of any witness statements or reliable documentary evidence able to disprove the suspect's contention that he was not a part of the massacre. Christukat died in 2020.

== Memorial ==
Map showing the modern and former village

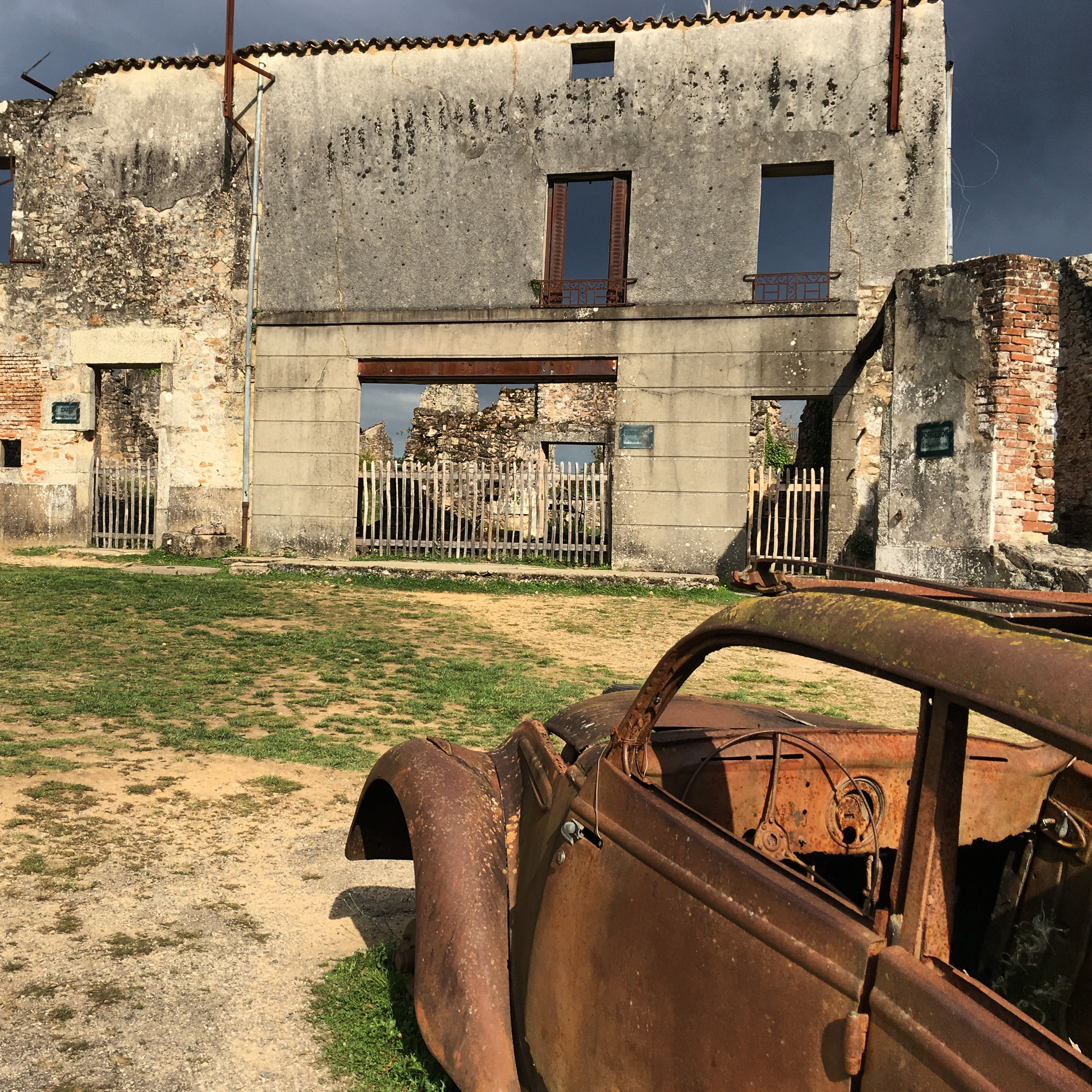
Memorial

After the war, General Charles de Gaulle decided the village should never be rebuilt, but would remain a memorial to the cruelty of the Nazi occupation. The new village of Oradour-sur-Glane (population 2,375 in 2012), northwest of the site of the massacre, was built after the war. The ruins of the original village remain as a memorial to the dead and to represent similar sites and events.

In 1999 French president Jacques Chirac dedicated a memorial museum, the Centre de la mémoire d'Oradour, near the entrance to the Village Martyr ("martyred village"). Its museum includes items recovered from the burned-out buildings: watches stopped at the time their owners were burned alive, glasses melted from the intense heat, and various personal items.

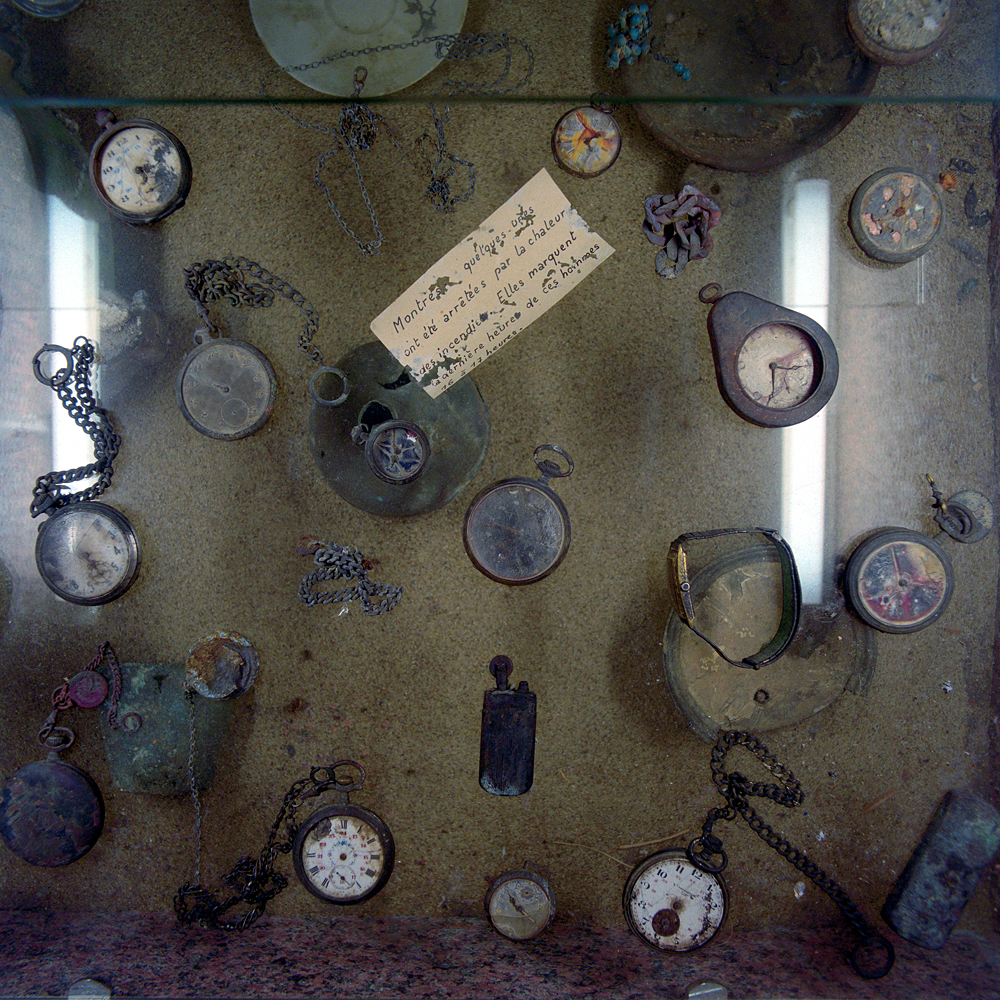
"Watches. Some have been stopped by the heat of the fires. They mark the last hour of these men: 16:00–17:00."

On 6 June 2004, at the commemorative ceremony of the Normandy invasion in Caen, German chancellor Gerhard Schröder pledged that Germany would not forget the Nazi atrocities and specifically mentioned Oradour-sur-Glane.

On 4 September 2013, German president Joachim Gauck and French president François Hollande visited the ghost village of Oradour-sur-Glane. A joint news conference broadcast by the two leaders followed their tour of the site. This was the first time a German president had come to the site of one of the biggest World War II massacres on French soil.

On 28 April 2017, French presidential candidate Emmanuel Macron visited Oradour-sur-Glane and met with the only remaining survivor of the massacre, Robert Hébras. Hébras was 18 at the time of the massacre and died at age 97 in 2023.

== In popular culture ==
Television

- The story of Oradour-sur-Glane begins and ends the 1973–74 British documentary television series The World at War, narrated by Laurence Olivier. The first and final episodes (1 and 26, entitled "A New Germany" and "Remember" respectively) show helicopter views of the destroyed village, interspersed with pictures of the victims that appear on their graves.
- The massacre is referenced in the 2010 series World War II in Colour in the episode "Overlord", which aired on 7 January 2010. It was also featured in part 2 of Hitler's Death Army, which aired on 27 November 2015, and showed both images from the time along with the ruins as they are today.
- Episode 1 of Season 10 "Abandoned Engineering" covered the massacre.
- The 2024 PBS documentary "Village of Death: Oradour-sur-Glane 1944", narrated by Jeff Daniels, describes the massacre.

Film

- The 1963 Czechoslovak film Ikarie XB-1 references the massacre, with a character referring to a crew of humans from the 20th century as "human trash, that left Auschwitz, Oradour, Hiroshima behind them."
- The 1975 French film Le vieux fusil, is based on these facts.
- The 1989 British film Souvenir, is based on the massacre. In the film, an ex-German soldier returns as an American to Oradour-sur-Glane where he participated in atrocities committed by the Nazis, during which his then French lover was murdered. The film is based on the book The Pork Butcher by David Hughes published in 1984 .
- A feature film, Une Vie avec Oradour, was released in September 2011 in France.

Literature

- In the 1947 Russian novel The Storm by Stalin Prize-winner Ilya Ehrenburg, there is a fictionalized detailed description of the massacre (part vi, chapter a), citing the actual place and the actual SS unit responsible. The novel was published in English in 1948 by the Foreign Languages Publishing House in Moscow, and in 1949 by Gaer Associates of New York.
- In 1984, David Hughes published The Pork Butcher, a novel based on the massacre of the inhabitants of Oradour-sur-Glane and the subsequent memorialisation of the razed village. The book was made into a film titled Souvenir in 1989.
- In The Hanging Garden (1998) by Ian Rankin, Detective Inspector John Rebus investigates a suspected war criminal accused of leading the massacre of the fictional village of Villefranche d'Albarede, based on Oradour-sur-Glane.
- The poet Gillian Clarke, National Poet of Wales, commemorates the massacre at Oradour-sur-Glane in two poems from her 2009 collection A Recipe for Water, "Oradour-sur-Glane" and "Singer".
- In 2013, Helen Watts published One Day in Oradour, a short novel based on the events of 1944. Some names of the characters and locations have been changed, and some characters are composites of several individuals.
- In 2015, Ethan Mordden published One Day in France, a short novel based on the events of 1944. Covering a twenty-four-hour period and moving back and forth between Oradour and nearby Limoges, the story fits invented characters into the historical record.
- The plot of The Alice Network, a 2017 historical novel by American author Kate Quinn, incorporates a reference to the massacre. Real-life survivor Marguerite Rouffanche appears as a minor character.

Music

- Silent Planet's 2014 song "Tiny Hands (Au Revoir)" describes the massacre in Oradour-sur-Glane through the eyes of Madame Marguerite Rouffanche, the sole survivor of the church massacre.

Musical

- In 2015, the German musical Mademoiselle Marie by Fritz Stiegler (script) and Matthias Lange (music) covered the hostile sentiments of Oradour descendants to Germans in a post-war love story of 1955. Visitors from Oradour to an outdoor performance in front of Cadolzburg Castle (Bavaria) praised it as "a message of reconciliation and tolerance". In 2017, a French audience in the new village of Oradour-sur-Glane enthusiastically applauded performances by the same (mostly) amateur troupe, which received praise as an act of international understanding.

== See also ==
- Babi Yar
- Bandenbekämpfung
- Belchite, a town in Spain with a similar memorial
- Distomo massacre, on the same date
- List of French villages destroyed in World War I
- List of massacres in France
- Ivanci massacre
- Kalavryta massacre
- Kandanos
- Koriukivka massacre
- Katyn massacre
- Khatyn massacre
- Ležáky massacre
- Lidice massacre
- Lipa massacre
- Massacre of villages under Kamešnica
- Maquis (World War II)
- Maquis du Vercors
- Maillé massacre
- Michniów massacre
- Pirčiupiai massacre
- Putten raid
- Burning of the Riga synagogues
- Sant'Anna di Stazzema massacre
- Camille Senon
- Sochy massacre
- Tulle massacre
- Wola massacre
- War crimes in World War II

== Bibliography ==
- Delage, Franck (1945). Oradour: Ville martyre [Oradour: Martyr City]. Collection libération. Paris. OCLC 560030269.
- Delarue, Jacques (1971). Trafics et crimes sous l'occupation [Trafficking and crime under the occupation]. Livre de poche #3199. Fayard. OCLC 299915232.
- Desourteaux, André; Hébras, Robert (1998). Oradour/Glane: notre village assassiné [Oradour/Glane: our murdered village] (in French). Montreuil-Bellay: Les Chemins de la Mémoire. ISBN 978-2-909826-65-3. OCLC 264574092.
- Farmer, Sarah. Martyred Village: Commemorating the 1944 Massacre at Oradour-sur-Glane. University of California Press, 2000.
- Fischbach, Bernard (2001). Oradour: l'extermination [Oradour: the extermination] (in French). Strasbourg: Ronald Hirlé. ISBN 978-2-85369-226-7. OCLC 35079972.
- Fouché, Jean-Jacques. Massacre At Oradour: France, 1944; Coming To Grips With Terror, Northern Illinois University Press, 2004.
- Fouché, Jean-Jacques; Beaubatie, Gilbert (2008). Tulle, nouveaux regards sur les pendaisons et les événements de juin 1944 [Tulle, new views on the hangings and the events of June 1944] (in French). Saint-Paul: Souny. ISBN 978-2-84886-171-5. OCLC 259957737.
- Hivernaud, Albert (1988). Petite histoire d'Oradour-sur-Glane: de la préhistoire à nos jours [A short history of Oradour-sur-Glane: from prehistory to today] (in French) (7 ed.). Limoges: A. Bontemps. OCLC 864900129.
- Mackness, Robin (1988). Oradour Massacre and Aftermath. A&C Black. ISBN 978-1-4482-0838-8. OCLC 1069111830.
- Mouvement de Libération Nationale (1945). Les Huns à Oradour-sur-Glane [The Huns in Oradour-sur-Glane] (in French). Haute-Vienne: Mouvement de Libération Nationale. OCLC 428066280.
- Penaud, Guy (2005). La "Das Reich": 2e SS Panzer-Division ['Das Reich': 2nd Panzer Division]. Périgueux: Lauze. ISBN 978-2-912032-76-8. OCLC 238272571.
- Weidinger, Otto (1986) [1st pub. Aalen (1985) "Tulle und Oradour : eine deutsch-französische Tragödie"]. Tulle et Oradour, tragédie franco-allemande [Tulle and Oradour, a Franco-German Tragedy]. Translated by d'Yllias, P. Aalen: Weidinger O. OCLC 490423450.
