= Otto Weidinger =

Nazi commander (1914–1990)

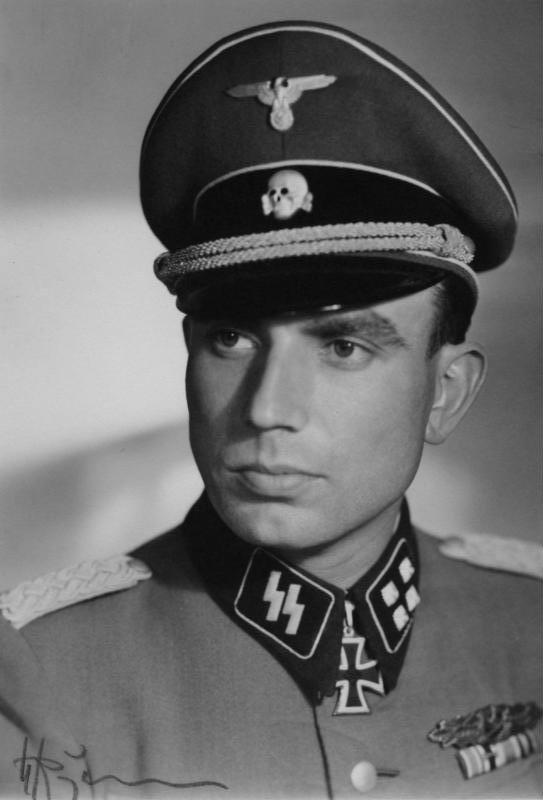
- Born: 27 May 1914; Würzburg, German Empire
- Died: 10 January 1990 (aged 75); Aalen, West Germany
- Military career
- Allegiance: Nazi Germany
- Branch: Waffen-SS
- Service years: 1934–1945
- Rank: Obersturmbannführer
- Conflicts: World War II
- Awards: Knight's Cross of the Iron Cross with Oak Leaves

Otto Weidinger (27 May 1914 – 10 January 1990) was a member of the Waffen-SS in Nazi Germany and a regimental commander in the SS Division Das Reich during World War II. In this capacity, he was involved in the Oradour massacre in France in June 1944. He was the author of a revisionist account of the division's history, produced under the auspices of HIAG, a Waffen-SS lobby group in post-war West Germany.

== World War II ==
Born in 1914, Otto Weidinger enlisted in the SS-Verfügungstruppe (SS-VT) (precursor to the Waffen-SS) in April 1934. His first assignment was as a camp guard at the Dachau concentration camp. With the SS Division Das Reich, he participated in the invasion of Poland and in the Battle of the Netherlands. During Operation Barbarossa, the invasion of the Soviet Union, he served on the divisional staff. In 1943, Weidinger was posted to the SS Regiment "Germania" and took part in the Battle of Kursk. In April 1944, Weidinger was awarded the Knight's Cross of the Iron Cross. He was promoted to command of the 4th SS Panzer-Grenadier Regiment "Der Führer" stationed in Normandy coastline. He fought with the division throughout the war, his final operation was covering the evacuation of 'Volksdeutsche' from Prague in the War's final days.

When World War II ended, Weidinger was held at the Dachau internment camp administered by the US Army. In August 1947, he was transferred to French custody, where he was charged with war crimes and stood trial in 1951. Weidinger was acquitted by a military court in Bordeaux in June 1951. At the trial of the perpetrators of the Oradour-sur-Glane massacre in Bordeaux in January 1953, Weidinger was a witness for the defense.

== Historical Record ==
From 1967 to 1982, Weidinger wrote the history of Regiment "Der Führer" and a multi-volume history of "Das Reich" published by Munin Verlag. The historical documentation was extensive and strove for an official representation of the division's history, backed by maps and operational orders. "No less than 5 volumes and well over 2,000 pages were devoted to the doings of the 2nd Panzer Division Das Reich.

== Awards ==
- Iron Cross (1939) 2nd Class (15 November 1939) & 1st Class (25 July 1940)
- German Cross in Gold on 26 November 1943
- Knight's Cross of the Iron Cross with Oak Leaves and Swords: Knight's Cross on 21 April 1944; Oak Leaves on 26 December 1944
  - Swords on 6 May 1945 (?)—No evidence of the award can be found in the German Federal Archives. The award was unlawfully presented by Sepp Dietrich, commander of the 6th Panzer Army. Weidinger was member of the Association of Knight's Cross Recipients.
