= Adolf Diekmann =

German Nazi war criminal (1914–1944)

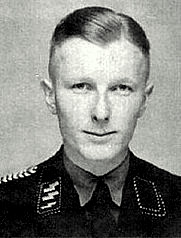
- Diekmann wearing a pre-war Allgemeine SS uniform c. 1936
- Born: 18 December 1914; Magdeburg, Prussia, German Empire
- Died: 29 June 1944 (aged 29); Noyers-Bocage, Normandy, German-occupied France
- Children: 2
- Military career
- Allegiance: Nazi Germany
- Branch: Waffen-SS
- Service years: 1933–44
- Rank: Sturmbannführer
- Nickname: "Otto"
- Service number: SS: 309,894
- Unit: 2nd SS Panzer Division Das Reich
- Commands: First Battalion, 4th SS Panzergrenadier Regiment (Der Führer)
- Known for: Oradour-sur-Glane massacre
- Conflicts: World War II: Invasion of Poland; Battle of France (WIA); Operation Barbarossa; Zhitomir–Berdichev offensive; Operation Overlord †
- Awards: Iron Cross 1st Class; Iron Cross 2nd Class; Golden Party Badge; Wound Badge in black; War Merit Cross (2nd class with swords)

Adolf Rudolf Reinhold Diekmann (18 December 1914 – 29 June 1944) was a German Nazi officer and war criminal in the Waffen-SS during World War II who orchestrated the Oradour-sur-Glane massacre in France on 10 June 1944. Under Diekmann's command, troops from the SS Division Das Reich killed 643 inhabitants in the village, most of whom were women and children. He said he committed the war crime in retaliation for the killing of fellow SS officer Helmut Kämpfe by the French Resistance. Diekmann died in combat in Normandy a few weeks later.

== Early life and early Nazi Party involvement ==
Adolf Diekmann was born on 18 December 1914 in Magdeburg, Prussia, in the German Empire to Heinrich and Anna Diekmann. Adolf was the second of four children, two girls and two boys. Heinrich was a primary school teacher. Adolf left school in 1932 at age 17.

On 1 April 1933, Diekmann joined the Nazi Party, one week after the Reichstag passed the Enabling Act of 1933, essentially granting Adolf Hitler dictatorial powers. He received membership number 1,752,411. Diekmann completed his Nazi work service between 18 May and 13 November in Burg, about 25 km (16 mi) from his home town. He then completed his high school education at a Nationalpolitischen Erziehungsanstalt, a Nazi secondary boarding school, in Naumburg, earning his degree on 12 December 1935.

== SS career ==
At the age of 21, Diekmann joined the SS on 1 March 1936 (SS number 309984) and was assigned to the Signals Corps stationed in the Adlershof neighborhood of Berlin. He was then sent to the SS-Junkerschule, the SS's leadership training facilities, at Bad Tölz in Bavaria in October 1937. He completed a course for platoon leaders at the Junker School's Dachau branch in August 1938 and was designated an SS-Untersturmführer, the most junior commissioned officer rank of the SS, in SS-Verfügungstruppe (SS-VT), a mechanized infantry unit at the disposal of the Führer.

== World War II ==
=== Occupation of Czechoslovakia ===
Diekmann's SS-VT unit was assigned to the Germania Regiment of the 2nd SS Panzer Division Das Reich. When Germany, the UK, France, and Italy signed the Munich Agreement ceding the Sudetenland to Germany on 30 September 1938, Diekmann's division marched into Czechoslovakia to annex the land for Germany.

=== Battle of France ===
In the spring of 1940, Diekmann became the adjutant of the Germania Regiment's Second Battalion ahead of the unit's participation in the Battle of France. During the fighting at Saint-Venant in northern France, Diekmann was shot in the lungs on 27 May 1940. Following his recovery, Diekmann was promoted to SS-Obersturmführer and became the Third Company, First Battalion commander in the Germania Regiment in June 1940. In May 1941, he was assigned as an instructor at the SS-Junkerschule at Bad Tölz, where he had been a student four years prior.

=== Operation Barbarossa ===
On 22 June 1941, Nazi Germany opened the Eastern Front by invading the Soviet Union in Operation Barbarossa. Diekmann returned to the 2nd SS Panzer Division Das Reich, which was assigned to Army Group Center. During the late summer of 1941, Army Group Center pushed toward Moscow in the Operation Typhoon during the Battle of Smolensk near Smolensk. By the time Das Reich took part in the Battle of Moscow, it had lost 60 percent of its combat strength. By February 1942, it had lost 10,690 men. Diekmann was promoted to SS-Hauptsturmführer on 20 April 1942. Due to combat losses, Das Reich was pulled from the front lines and sent west to refit as a Panzergrenadier mechanized infantry division. It returned to Russia where it fought in the Zhitomir–Berdichev Offensive during the winter of 1943–44.

In January 1944, the Das Reich division was sent to the southern French town of Montauban as a reserve unit, in preparation for the anticipated Allied invasion (Operation Overlord) of occupied Europe. While in southern France, Diekmann was promoted on 8 June 1944—two days after the Normandy landings—to SS-Sturmbannführer. He was given command of the 1st Battalion, 4th SS Panzergrenadier Regiment (Der Fuhrer), in the Das Reich Division.

=== Oradour-sur-Glane massacre ===
Following the Allied invasion of Normandy, the French resistance intensified its efforts to disrupt German communications and supply lines. German military commanders like Diekmann who had seen service on the Eastern Front had become conditioned by the extraordinary brutality of anti-partisan measures there. In response to real or perceived resistance activity in France, those commanders took a hard and intensified approach.

On 9 June 1944, a fellow SS-Sturmbannführer and a personal friend, Helmut Kämpfe, was captured four kilometres (2 1/2 miles) east of Saint-Léonard-de-Noblat by a Resistance group led by Sergeant Jean Canou from Colonel Georges Guingouin's Brigade, a group in the Maquis du Limousin. Hence, a monument designed by the artist Sanfourche commemorates these events in Moissannes Canou handed Kämpfe over to Guingouin. The following day, the highly-decorated SS officer was executed on the orders of Guingouin or killed during an attempt to escape. His body was burned although some reports say he was burned alive.

When the SS Division discovered that Kämpfe had been kidnapped, Diekmann led troops from the 3rd Company, 1st Battalion, 4th SS Panzer Grenadier Regiment and members of the Milice on a search of the surrounding area. Two local men were shot dead 2.5 km (1 1/2 mi) east of Saint-Léonard-de-Noblat by SS men under Diekmann's command. Diekmann reached the outskirts of Oradour-sur-Glane. He told his superiors that he had ordered his men to raze the village and kill the inhabitants (245 women, 207 children and 190 men) because he had become enraged after he had found Kämpfe's handcuffed body inside a German field ambulance with the remains of other German soldiers. He believed that the vehicle had been set alight and burned alive everyone inside.

The 2024 PBS documentary "Village of Death: Oradour-sur-Glane 1944" describes Diekmann's superior, General Heinz Lammerding holding a meeting in June 1944 in Limoges in which he discussed wanting to inflict brutal retribution on a French village to teach a lesson to the French resistance. It is described in the documentary that a French collaborator, Jean Fiyol, suggested Oradour-sur-Glane because it was a quiet village that would not attract outside attention and that orders were given to Diekmann from the German high command to attack the village. The documentary also mentions that Diekmann's friend Kämpfe had been killed and that Diekmann "was out for blood and payback." The documentary emphasizes the order given by Lammerding but also places blame on Diekmann for carrying it out in such a brutal fashion. The documentary does not delve into the specifics of Lammerding's order and whether Diekmann's actions may have exceeded what Lammerding had intended with his order. In 1953, Heinz Lammerding was tried in absentia for ordering the massacre at Oradour-sur-Glane and convicted but he was never extradited to France and he died in 1971 in West Germany.

=== Aftermath ===
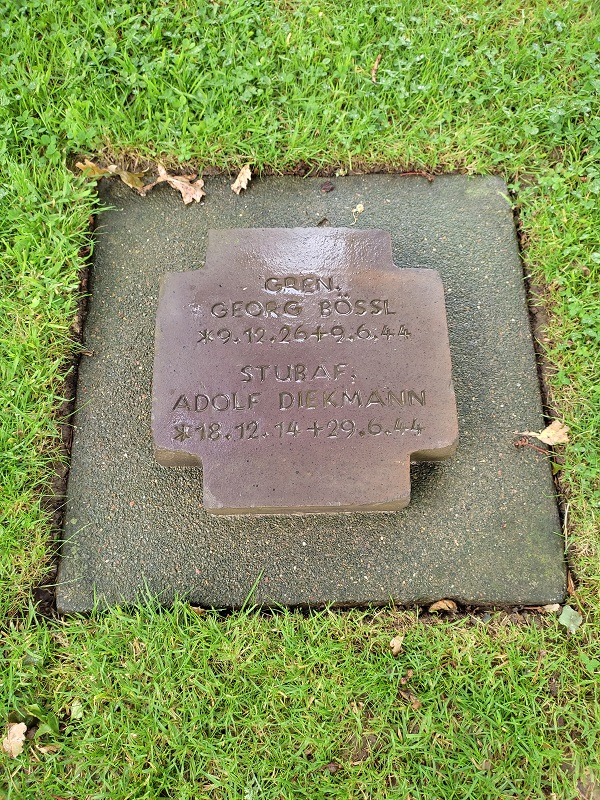
Diekmann's grave in La Cambe German war cemetery

After hearing the testimony of Diekmann, the commander of the 4th SS Panzer Grenadier Regiment, SS-Standartenführer Sylvester Stadler, ordered that he should face a court-martial for ordering the massacre at Oradour-sur-Glane. SS-Brigadeführer Heinz Lammerding, Das Reich's division commander, agreed with the decision. All charges against Diekmann were dropped after he was killed near Noyers-Bocage while fighting in Normandy against British troops on 29 June 1944. Diekmann, who was not wearing a helmet at the time of his death, was killed by shrapnel to his head from a British artillery shell. He was buried at La Cambe German war cemetery in block 25, row 4, grave 121.

== Legacy ==
On 12 January 1953, a military tribunal in Bordeaux heard the charges against the surviving 65 of the 200 or so SS men who had been involved in the Oradour-sur-Glane massacre. 20 defendants were convicted of war crimes. Diekmann was dead but the tribunal found him responsible for ordering the killings. Almost 70 years after the massacre, former soldiers from Diekmann's command were still being investigated over the killings. On 8 January 2014, Werner Christukat, an 88-year-old former member of the 3rd Company of the 1st Battalion of the 4th SS Panzer Grenadier Regiment was charged, by the state court in Cologne, with 25 charges of murder and hundreds of counts of accessory to murder in connection with the massacre in Oradour-sur-Glane. The suspect, who was identified only as Werner C., had until 31 March 2014 to respond to the charges. If the case had gone to trial, it might have been held in a juvenile court because the suspect was only 19 at the time the crime occurred. According to his attorney, Rainer Pohlen, the suspect acknowledged being at the village but denied being involved in any killings. On 9 December 2014, the court dropped the case, citing a lack of witness statements or reliable documentary evidence able to disprove the suspect's contention that he was not a part of the massacre.

== Personal life ==
Diekmann met Hedwig Meindle, a medical student, when Germany invaded Czechoslovakia. They were married on 12 February 1940 and had sons Rainer (born 11 March 1942) and Uwe Rudolf (born 1943). The family lived in Elbogen, near Hedwig's parents. Diekmann was sent to France shortly after the wedding. After Adolf's death, Hedwig remarried and the children left Elbogen to live in the Bavarian Forest. Hedwig later joined them and opened a medical practice in Monheim, Swabia. According to her son Rainer, her first husband's name was taboo to mention. According to a 2014 interview, Diekmann's eldest son Rainer had heard from his maternal grandfather's wife that his father Adolf had done "something very serious over there [Oradour] during the war." Several years later, Rainer learned of his father's culpability for the massacre.
