= Moissannes =

- Commune
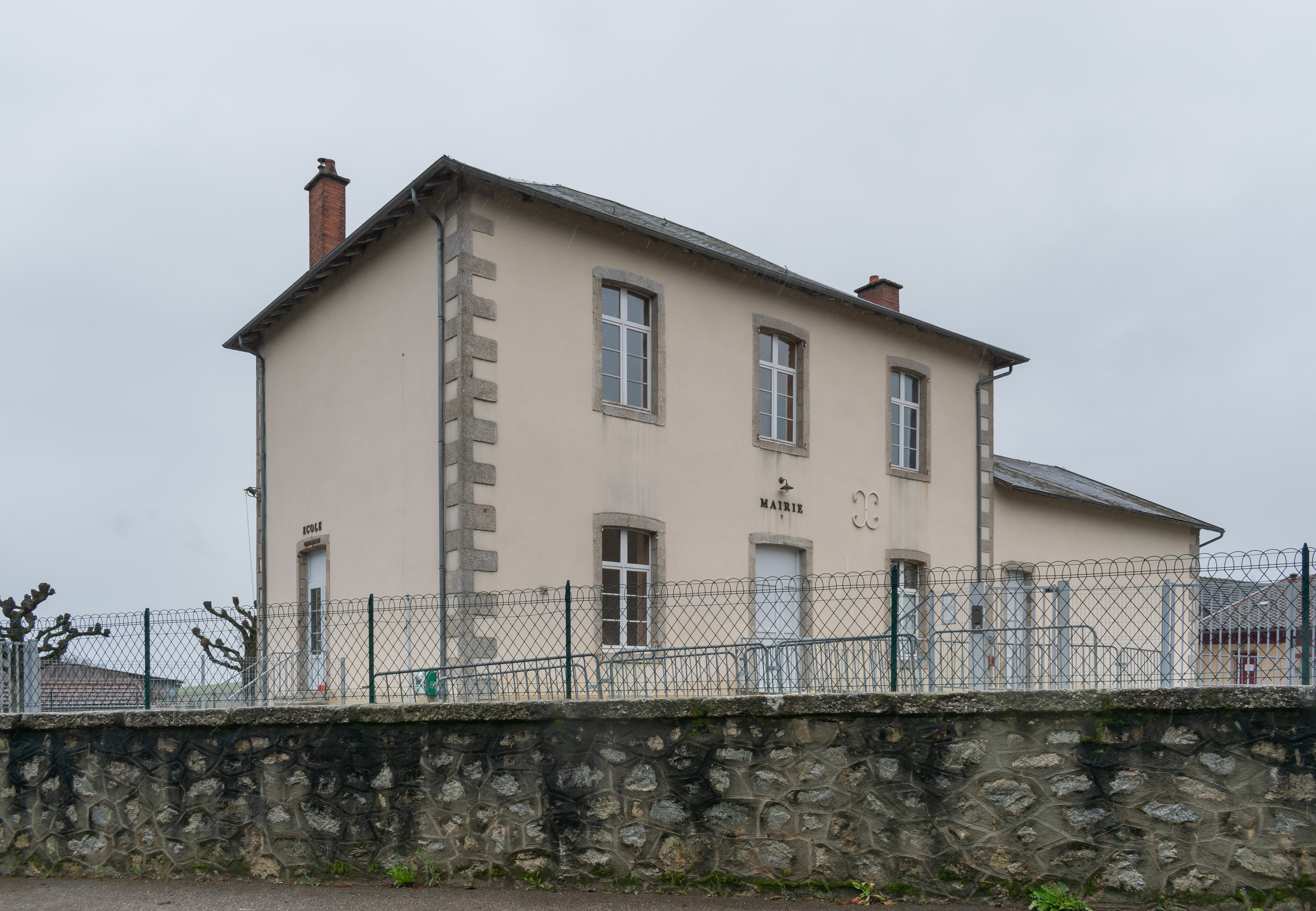
- Town hall of Moissannes
- Location of Moissannes
- Location within France Location within Nouvelle-Aquitaine
- Coordinates: 45°52′33″N 1°33′57″E
- Country: France
- Region: Nouvelle-Aquitaine
- Department: Haute-Vienne
- Arrondissement: Limoges
- Canton: Saint-Léonard-de-Noblat

Government
  - Mayor (2020–2026): Jean-Louis Bregaint
- Area^{1}: 24.64 km^{2} (9.51 sq mi)
- Highest elevation: 560 m (1,840 ft)
- Lowest elevation: 314 m (1,030 ft)
- Population (2023): 328
  - Density: 13.3/km^{2} (34.5/sq mi)
- Time zone: UTC+01:00 (CET)
  - Summer (DST): UTC+02:00 (CEST)
- INSEE/Postal code: 87099 /87400
- ^{1} French Land Register data, which excludes lakes, ponds, glaciers > 1 km^{2} (0.386 sq mi or 247 acres) and river estuaries.

Moissannes (French pronunciation: [mwasan]; Occitan: Moissanas) is a commune in the Haute-Vienne department in the Nouvelle-Aquitaine region in west-central France.

== See also ==
- Communes of the Haute-Vienne department
