= Heinz Lammerding =

German general (1905–1971)

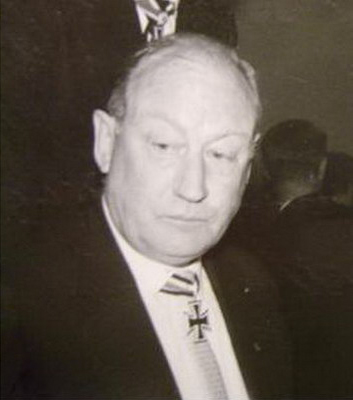
- Born: 27 August 1905; Dortmund, German Empire
- Died: 13 January 1971 (aged 65); Bad Tölz, West Germany
- Known for: Tulle murders Oradour-sur-Glane massacre
- Status: Deceased
- Conviction: War crimes
- Penalty: Death (in absentia)
- SS career
- Allegiance: Nazi Germany
- Branch: Waffen-SS
- Service years: 1933–1945
- Rank: SS-Gruppenführer
- Commands: SS Division Das Reich
- Conflicts: World War II
- Awards: Knight's Cross of the Iron Cross

Heinz Lammerding (27 August 1905 – 13 January 1971) was a German SS officer convicted of war crimes during the Nazi era. During World War II, he commanded the SS Panzer Division Das Reich that perpetrated the Tulle and the Oradour-sur-Glane massacres in occupied France. After the war, Lammerding was convicted in absentia for having ordered the murder of approximately 750 French civilians, but remained protected by Germany after serving a prison sentence there.

== War-crimes trial ==
In 1953, Lammerding was tried in France for war crimes, for ordering two massacres in 1944: at Tulle and at Oradour-sur-Glane. The 2024 PBS documentary "Village of Death: Oradour-sur-Glane 1944" describes Lammerding holding a meeting in June 1944 in Limoges where he discussed wanting to inflict brutal retribution on a French village in order to teach a lesson to the French resistance. It is described in the documentary that French collaborator, Jean Fiyol, suggested Oradour-sur-Glane because it was a quiet village that would not attract outside attention. The massacre was carried out by SS Officer Adolf Diekmann. The documentary does not delve into the specifics of Lammerding's order and whether Diekmann's actions may have exceeded what Lammerding had intended with his order. Lammerding was sentenced to death in absentia by the court of Bordeaux, but he was never extradited from West Germany nor was he ever sentenced by a German court. According to Danny S. Parker, Lammerding had already been tried in West Germany, convicted of war crimes and had served a prison sentence. He, therefore, was not subject to extradition under the Bonn constitution, much to the consternation of the French. They threatened to send in a commando unit to seize him, as the Israelis did in the case of Adolf Eichmann. However, before this could occur, Lammerding died in 1971 from cancer.

== Funeral ==
His funeral in 1971 turned into a reunion of over 200 former SS personnel.

== Awards ==
- German Cross in Gold on 24 April 1943 as SS-Standartenführer and commander of SS-Regiment "Thule"
- Knight's Cross of the Iron Cross on 11 April 1944 as SS-Oberführer and commander of Kampfgruppe "Das Reich"

Military offices
| Preceded by SS-Obergruppenführer Walter Krüger | Commander of SS Division Das Reich; 23 October 1943 – 24 July 1944 | Succeeded by SS-Standartenführer Christian Tychsen |
| Preceded by SS-Brigadeführer Otto Baum | Commander of SS Division Das Reich; 23 October 1944 – 20 January 1945 | Succeeded by SS-Standartenführer Karl Kreutz |
