= 2nd SS Panzer Division Das Reich =

German armored division (1939–1945)

2nd SS Panzer Division "Das Reich"
- 2. SS-Panzerdivision "Das Reich"
- Unit insignia, the Wolfsangel
- Active: 1939–1945
- Country: Nazi Germany
- Branch: (Schutzstaffel) Waffen-SS
- Type: Panzer
- Role: Armoured warfare
- Size: Division
- Engagements: World War II; Battle of France; Invasion of Yugoslavia; Operation Barbarossa; Operation Typhoon; Battle of Kursk; Operation Overlord; Battle of the Bulge; Operation Spring Awakening

Commanders
- Notable commanders: Paul Hausser; Heinz Lammerding

The 2nd SS Panzer Division Das Reich (German: 2. SS-Panzerdivision "Das Reich") or SS Division Das Reich was an armored division of the Waffen-SS of Nazi Germany during World War II.

Initially formed from regiments of the SS-Verfügungstruppe (SS-VT), Das Reich initially served during the Battle of France in 1940 before seeing combat on the Eastern Front between 1941 and 1944. It was transferred to the Western Front in 1944, where it fought in the Battle of Normandy and the Battle of the Bulge. Toward the end of the war, it was transferred back to the Eastern Front, where it participated in Operation Spring Awakening in Hungary.

The division became notorious for its brutality, committing numerous war crimes during its operations. The division was responsible for several massacres, including the Tulle massacre on 9 June 1944, and the Oradour-sur-Glane massacre on 10 June 1944.

== Operational history ==
In August 1939 Adolf Hitler placed the Leibstandarte SS Adolf Hitler (LSSAH), later SS Division Leibstandarte, and the SS-Verfügungstruppe (SS-VT) under the operational command of the High Command of the German Army. The units' performance during the Invasion of Poland raised doubts over the combat effectiveness of the SS-VT. Himmler insisted that the SS-VT should be allowed to fight in its own formations under its own commanders, while the OKW tried to have the SS-VT disbanded altogether. Hitler was unwilling to upset either the army or Heinrich Himmler, and chose a third path. He ordered that the SS-VT form its own divisions but that the divisions would be under army command.

In October 1939 the SS-Verfügungstruppe regiments Deutschland, Germania and Der Führer were organized into the SS-Verfügungs-Division with Paul Hausser, a former army officer, as commander. Thereafter, the SS-VT and the LSSAH took part in combat training while under army commands in preparation for Fall Gelb, the invasion against the Low Countries and France in 1940.

In May 1940, the Der Führer Regiment was detached from the division and relocated near the Dutch border, with the remainder of the SS-VT Division behind the line in Münster, awaiting the order to invade the Netherlands. The regiment and LSSAH participated in the ground invasion of the Netherlands, which began on 10 May. An NCO in Der Führer's 3rd Battalion, Oberscharführer Ludwig Kepplinger, became the first Waffen-SS recipient of the Knight's Cross, awarded for leading a patrol over the ruined bridge at IJssel and taking Fort Westervoort by surprise.

On the following day, the rest of the SS-VT Division crossed into the Netherlands, participating in the drive for the Dutch central front and Rotterdam, which they reached on 12 May. After that city had been captured, the SS-VT Division, along with other German formations, were sent to "mop up" the remaining French-Dutch force holding out in the area of Zeeland and the islands of Walcheren and South Beveland. On 17 May the Deutschland Regiment successfully made an opposed crossing of the Sloedam from east to west, a feat attempted four years later by elements of the 2nd Canadian Division and the 52nd (Lowland) Division during the Battle of the Scheldt.

After the fighting in the Netherlands ended, the SS-VT Division was transferred to France. On 24 May the LSSAH, along with the SS-VT Division were positioned to hold the perimeter around Dunkirk and reduce the size of the pocket containing the encircled British Expeditionary Force and French forces. A patrol from the SS-VT Division crossed the canal at Saint-Venant, but was destroyed by British armor. A larger force from the SS-VT Division then crossed the canal and formed a bridgehead at Saint-Venant; 30 miles from Dunkirk. On the following day, British forces attacked Saint-Venant, forcing the SS-VT Division to retreat and relinquish ground. On 26 May the German advance resumed. On 27 May, Regiment Deutschland of the SS-VT Division reached the Allied defensive line on the Leie River at Merville. They forced a bridgehead across the river and waited for the SS Division Totenkopf to arrive to cover their flank. What arrived first was a unit of British tanks, which penetrated their position. The SS-VT managed to hold on against the British tank force, which got to within 15 feet of commander Felix Steiner's position. Only the arrival of the Totenkopf Panzerjäger platoon saved the Regiment Deutschland from being destroyed and their bridgehead lost. By 30 May, most of the remaining Allied forces had been pushed back into Dunkirk where they were evacuated by sea to England. The SS-VT Division next took part in the drive towards Paris.

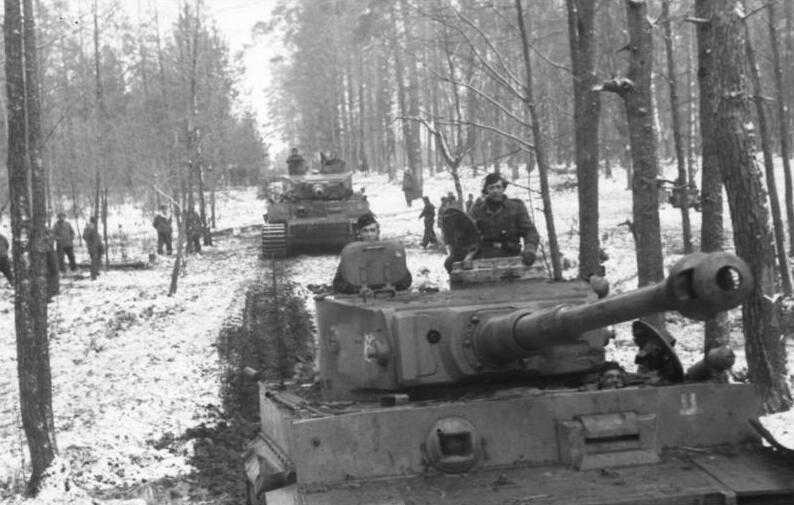
The division near Kirovograd, Soviet Union, December 1943, two Tiger tanks

After the Battle of France, the SS-VT was officially renamed the Waffen-SS in July 1940. In December 1940 the Germania Regiment was removed from the Verfügungs-Division and used to form the cadre of a new division, SS Division Germania. By the start of 1941, the division was renamed "Reich" (in 1942 "Das Reich"), and "Germania" was renamed as SS Division Wiking.

In April 1941, Germany invaded Yugoslavia and Greece. The LSSAH and Das Reich were attached to separate army Panzer Corps. Fritz Klingenberg, a company commander in Das Reich, led his men across Yugoslavia to the capital, Belgrade, where a small group in the vanguard accepted the surrender of the city on 13 April. A few days later Yugoslavia surrendered.

For the invasion of the Soviet Union (Operation Barbarossa), Das Reich fought under Army Group Center, taking part in the Battle of Yelnya near Smolensk; it was then in the spearhead of Operation Typhoon aimed at the capture of the Soviet capital. By the time the division took part in the Battle of Moscow, it had lost 60 percent of its combat strength. It was further reduced in the Soviet Winter counter-offensive: for example, the Der Führer Regiment was down to 35 men out of the 2,000 that had started the campaign in June. The division was "mauled". By February 1942, it had lost 10,690 men. By mid-1942, the division was pulled out of the fighting line and sent to the west to refit as a Panzergrenadier division.

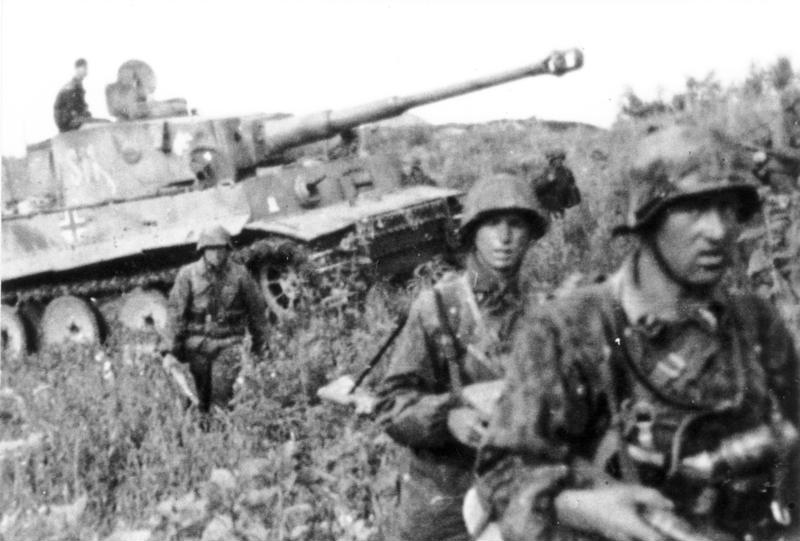
Division's Tiger I tank, during the Battle of Kursk

In January 1943, the division was transferred back from France to the Eastern Front. There it participated in the fighting around Kharkov. Here the unit engaged in some heavy fighting against 1st Guards Cavalry Corps, among other units. Thereafter, it was one of three SS divisions which made up the II SS Panzer Corps, which took part in the Battle of Kursk that summer. The division operated in the southern sector of the Kursk bulge during the Battle of Prokhorovka. It was pulled out of the battle along with the other SS divisions when the offensive was discontinued, giving the strategic initiative to the Red Army. The Battle of Kursk was the first time that a German strategic offensive was halted before it could break through enemy defences and penetrate to its strategic depths. In October, the division was redesignated, this time as SS Panzer Division Das Reich to reflect its complement of tanks.

=== March of Das Reich ===
In April 1944, Das Reich took up a new base near the city of Montauban in southern France. The location was chosen so that the division could respond quickly to the anticipated Allied invasion of France on either the Atlantic Coast or the Mediterranean Sea. In May the division received 37 Panzer IV and 55 Panther tanks, well below the official complement of 62 of each, but a full complement of 30 Sturmgeschütz III assault guns. Fuel and truck shortages hampered training and movement and many of the more than 15,000 men in the division were recent recruits and inadequately trained.

The Allied Normandy landings took place on 6 June 1944. On 7 June Das Reich was ordered to move to Normandy to reinforce the German units contesting the Allied invasion. An unopposed movement of men and equipment by railroad would have taken three or four days over approximately 700 kilometres (430 miles). A rail transfer was forestalled by the Special Operations Executive (SOE). The rail cars to be used for transporting the tanks and equipment were unguarded. In the days before 6 June, French operatives of the SOE's Pimento network, headed by Anthony Brooks, sabotaged the rail cars by draining the axle oil and replacing it with an abrasive powder that caused the axles of the cars to seize up. The powder had been parachuted in by SOE. The perpetrators of the sabotage were a 16-year-old girl named Tetty, her boyfriend, her 14-year-old sister and several of their friends.

Das Reich left Montauban on 8 June with 1,400 vehicles and proceeded northwards by road. The steel tracks of the tanks and assault guns wore out; vehicles broke down frequently and fuel was in short supply. Pinprick attacks by groups of resistors, called Maquis, killed 15 Germans on the first two days of the movement. More than 100 French were killed, many of them unarmed civilians. Das Reich was ordered to suppress the Maquis during its journey; "to break the spirit of the population by making examples". The division carried out the order by Bandenbekämpfung (gang suppression) massacring hundreds of civilians on 9 and 10 June in Tulle and Oradour-sur-Glane. Attacks by resistance forces mostly ended on 12 June as Das Reich moved into less favorable territory for ambushes.

Air attacks hindered the progress of the division in the last phases of its northward journey. On 11 June British bombers attacked and destroyed several railcars full of much-needed fuel at Châtellerault. The airstrike was directed by B Squadron, 1st Special Air Service (SAS) as Operation Bulbasket. After its advance elements crossed the Loire River on 13 June, the division was under constant air attacks during the day and Das Reich arrived in Normandy piecemeal, between 15 and 30 June, its arrival delayed at least several days by the resistance attacks and air strikes. Rather than going on the offensive to try to push the Allies back into the sea, Das Reich initially found itself mostly plugging gaps in the German defenses. The division was not reunited until 10 July.

=== Later actions ===
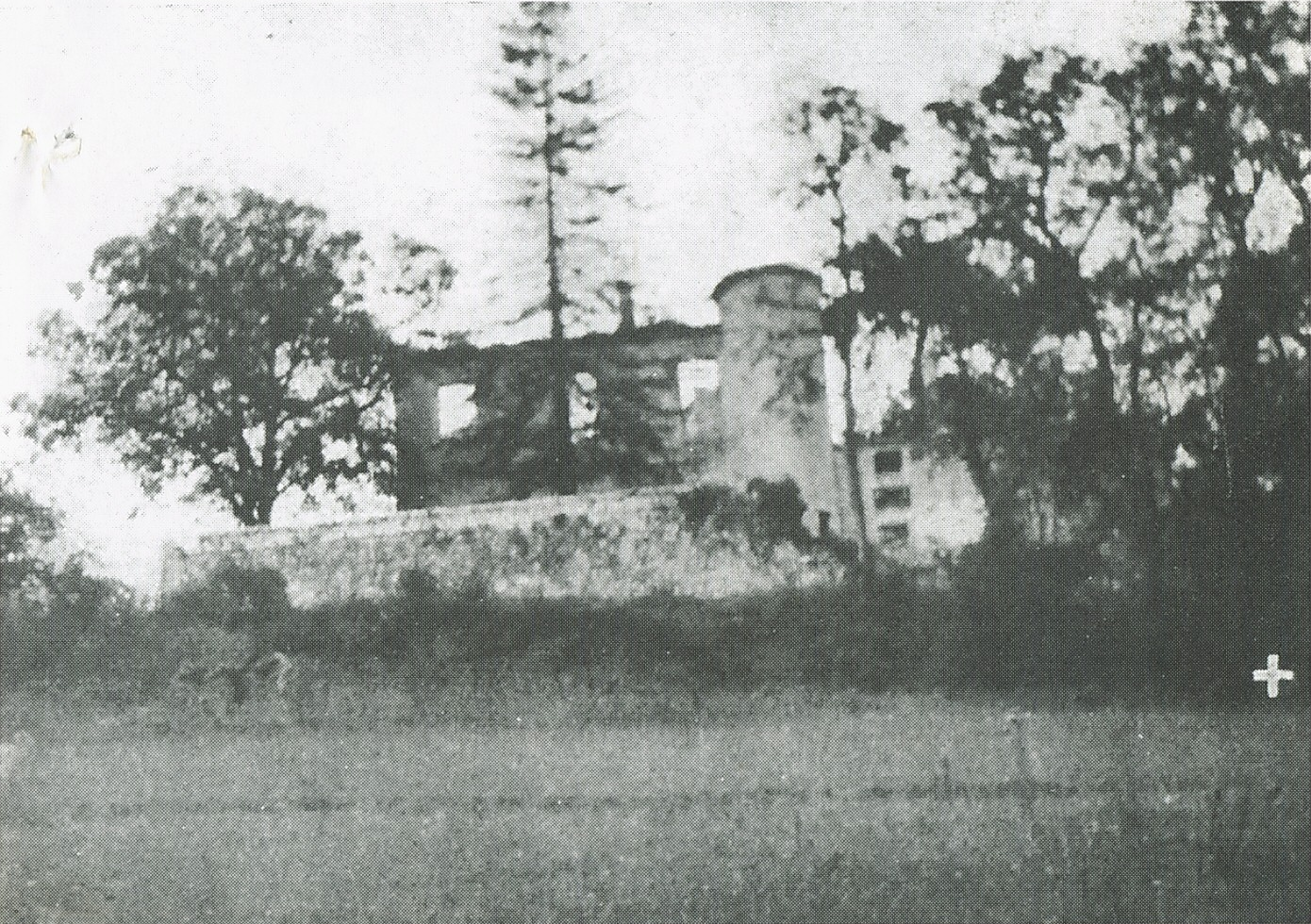
One of the division's war crimes took place at Laclotte Castle on 7 June 1944. At right, the location where civilians were shot.

On 4 August Hitler ordered a counter-offensive, Operation Lüttich, from Vire towards Avranches; the operation included Das Reich. The Allied forces were prepared for this offensive and an air attack on the combined German units proved devastating. Paris was liberated on 25 August, and the last of the German forces withdrew over the Seine by the end of August, ending the Normandy campaign. The US 2nd Armored Division had encircled Das Reich and the 17th SS Panzergrenadier Division Götz von Berlichingen around Roncey. In the process Das Reich and 17th SS Panzergrenadier Division lost most of their armored vehicles. Around Roncey P-47 Thunderbolts of the 405th Fighter Group destroyed a German column of 122 tanks, 259 other vehicles, and 11 artillery pieces. An attack by British Typhoons close to La Baleine destroyed 9 tanks, 8 other armored vehicles, and 20 soft-skinned vehicles.

A column around La Chapelle was attacked at point blank range by 2nd Armored Division artillery. Over two hours American artillery fired over 700 rounds into the column. The division suffered the loss of 50 dead, 60 wounded and 197 taken prisoner. Material losses were over 260 German combat vehicles destroyed. Beyond the town another 1,150 German soldiers were killed in combat. The division also lost an additional 96 armored combat vehicles and trucks. On 13 September 1944, the division reported having 12,357 officers and men, down from 17,283 on 1 July. The division surrendered to the U.S. Army in May 1945.

== War crimes ==
=== Murder of civilians in Yugoslavia ===
During the invasion of Yugoslavia in April 1941, members of the division committed crimes against the civilian population as well as Yugoslav prisoners of war in the area of Alibunar (Vojvodina, Serbia) where an estimated 200 people were murdered. 51 corpses were found in a mass grave in Alibunar's Serbian Orthodox Church's yard, as well as 54 others in the nearby settlement of Selište. The crimes were committed as a retaliation for the involvement of armed civilians during the fighting in the area and the murder of the regimental adjutant.

=== Murder of Jews in Minsk ===
A support unit of the division aided an SS extermination group in the slaughter of 920 Jews near Minsk in September 1941.

=== Tulle massacre ===
After the Allied second front opened on 6 June 1944, all resistance groups joined "into the uprising". Part of the division was ordered to attack the rural strongholds of French Resistance fighters as it moved to Normandy. After a successful FTP offensive on 7 and 8 June 1944, Das Reich was ordered to the Tulle-Limoges area. The arrival of the SS troops "rescued the beleaguered" army troops and ended the fighting in the town of Tulle. On 9 June, in reprisal for the German losses, the SS hanged 99 men from the town and another 149 were deported to Germany.

=== Oradour-sur-Glane ===
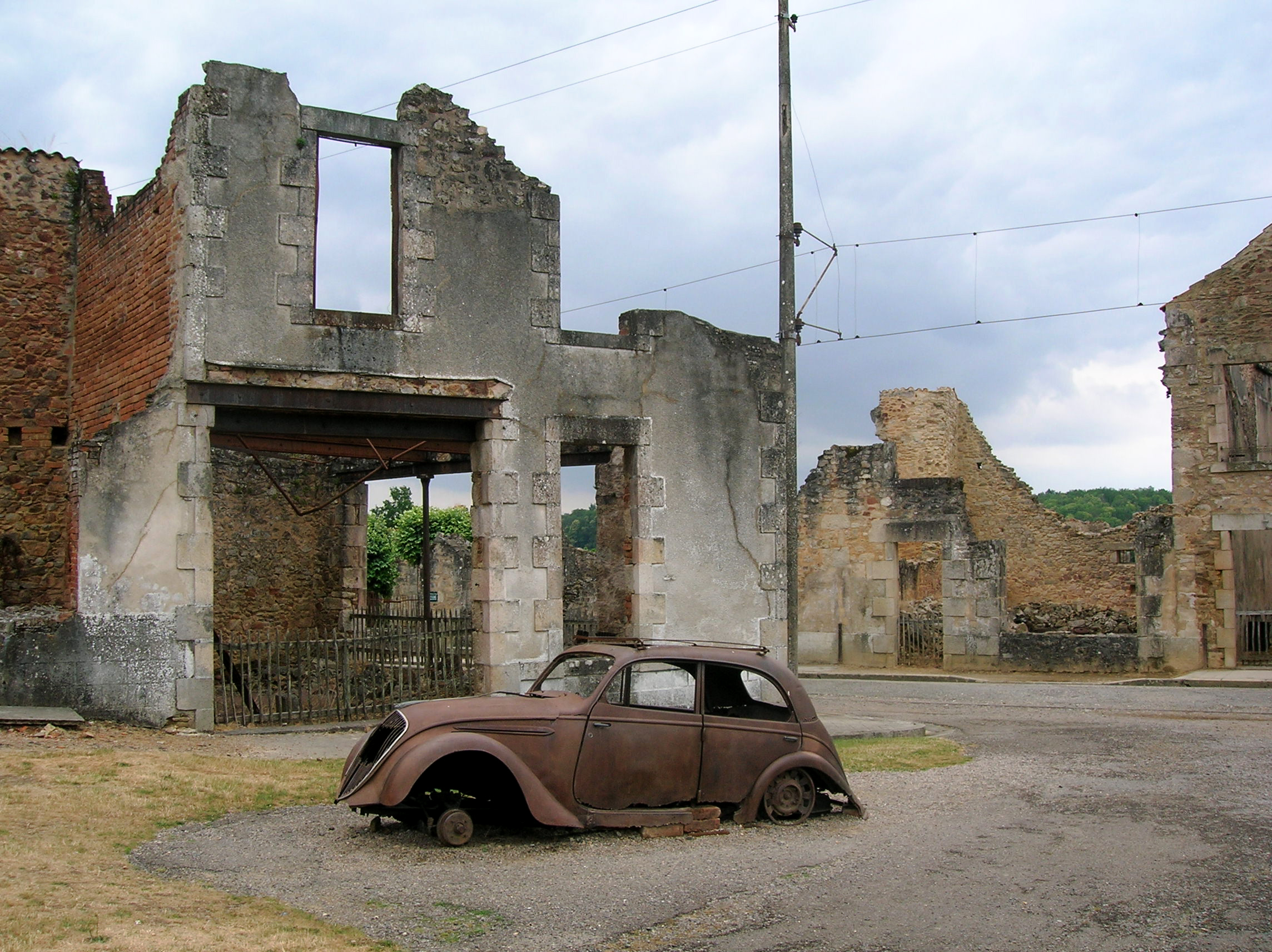
Burned out cars and buildings still litter the untouched remains of the original village of Oradour-sur-Glane

On 10 June 1944, the division massacred 642 French civilians in the village of Oradour-sur-Glane, in the Limousin region. SS-Sturmbannführer Adolf Diekmann, commander of the I Battalion, 4th SS Panzergrenadier Regiment (Der Führer) that committed the massacre, claimed that it was a just retaliation due to partisan activity in nearby Tulle and the kidnapping of Sturmbannführer Helmut Kämpfe, commander of the III Battalion, although the German authorities had already executed ninety-nine people in the Tulle massacre, following the killing of some forty German soldiers in Tulle by the Maquis resistance movement.

On 10 June, Diekmann's battalion sealed off Oradour-sur-Glane, and ordered all the townspeople to assemble in the village square, ostensibly to have their identity papers examined. All the women and children were locked in the church. The men were led to six barns and sheds. One of the six survivors of the massacre, Robert Hebras, described the killings as a deliberate act of mass murder. In 2013, he told the U.K. newspaper The Mirror that the SS intentionally burned men, women, and children after locking them in the church and spraying it with machine gun fire:

It was simply an execution. There were a handful of Nazis in front of us, in their uniforms. They just raised their machine guns and started firing across us, at our legs to stop us getting out. They were strafing, not aiming. Men in front of me just started falling. I got caught by several bullets, but I survived because those in front of me got the full impact. I was so lucky. Four of us in the barn managed to get away because we remained completely still under piles of bodies. One man tried to get away before they had gone – he was shot dead. The SS were walking around and shooting anything that moved. They poured petrol on bodies and then set them alight."

Marcel Darthout's experience was similar. His testimony appears in historian Sara Farmer's 2000 book Martyred Village: Commemorating the 1944 Massacre at Oradour-sur-Glane:

We felt the bullets, which brought me down. I dove... everyone was on top of me. And they were still firing. And there was shouting. And crying. I had a friend who was lying on top of me and who was moaning. And then it was over. No more shots. And they came at us, stepping on us. And with a rifle they finished us off. They finished off my friend who was on top of me. I felt it when he died.

Darthout and Hebras' eyewitness testimony was corroborated by other survivors of the massacre. One other survivor, Roger Godfrin, escaped from the school for refugees despite being shot at by SS soldiers. Only one woman, Marguerite Rouffanche, survived from the church. She later testified that at about five in the afternoon, two German soldiers placed a crate of explosives on the altar and attached a fuse to it. She and another woman and her baby hid behind the sacristy; after the explosion they climbed on a stool and jumped out of a window three meters from the ground. A burst of machine gun fire hit all of them, but Rouffanche was able to crawl into the presbytery garden. The woman and infant were killed.

Diekmann was later killed in the battle of Normandy in 1944. On 12 January 1953, a military tribunal in Bordeaux, heard the case against the surviving sixty-five of the approximately two hundred SS soldiers who had been involved. Only twenty-one of them were present. Seven of them were Germans, but fourteen were Alsatians, (French nationals of Germanic culture). On 11 February, twenty defendants were found guilty, but were released after only a few months for lack of evidence. In December 2011 German police raided the homes of six former members of the division, all aged 85 or 86, to determine exactly what role the men had played that day. SS-Brigadeführer Heinz Lammerding, who had given the orders for retaliation against the Resistance, died in 1971, following a successful business career in West Germany. The French government never obtained his extradition from the German authorities.

== Post-war apologia ==
Following the war, one of the regimental commanders of the division, Otto Weidinger, wrote an apologia of the division under the auspices of HIAG, the historical negationist organization and a lobby group of former Waffen-SS members. The unit narrative was extensive and strived for a so-called official representation of their history, backed by maps and operational orders. "No less than 5 volumes and well over 2,000 pages were devoted to the doings of the 2nd Panzer Division Das Reich", points out the military historian S.P. MacKenzie.

The Das Reich divisional history was published by HIAG's publishing house Munin Verlag. Its express aim was to publish the "war narratives" of former Waffen-SS members, and the titles did not go through the rigorous processes of historical research or assessment common in the traditional historical works; they were negationist accounts unedited by professional historians and presented the former Waffen-SS members' version of events. The divisional history, like other HIAG publications, focused on the positive, "heroic" side of National Socialism. The French author Jean-Paul Picaper, who studied the Oradour massacre, notes the tendentious nature of Weidinger's narrative: it provided a sanitized version of history without any references to war crimes.

== Commanders ==
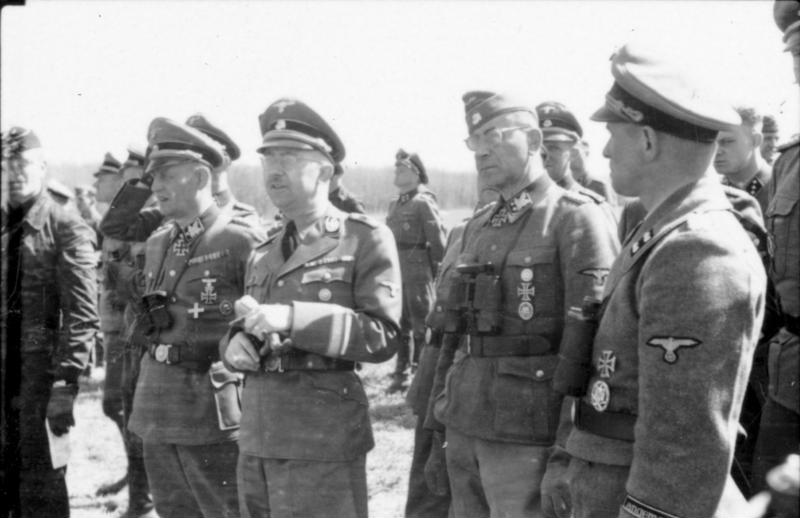
Walter Krüger, Heinrich Himmler and Paul Hausser near Kharkov, Soviet Union, April 1943

No.	Portrait	Commander	Took office	Left office	Time in office
1	Paul Hausser	SS-Obergruppenführer; Paul Hausser (1880–1972)	19 October 1939	14 October 1941	1 year, 360 days
2	Wilhelm Bittrich	SS-Brigadeführer; Wilhelm Bittrich (1894–1979)	14 October 1941	31 December 1941	78 days
3	Matthias Kleinheisterkamp	SS-Brigadeführer; Matthias Kleinheisterkamp (1893–1945)	31 December 1941	19 April 1942	109 days
4	Georg Keppler	SS-Gruppenführer; Georg Keppler (1894–1966)	19 April 1942	10 February 1943	297 days
5	Herbert-Ernst Vahl	SS-Brigadeführer; Herbert-Ernst Vahl (1896–1944)	10 February 1943	18 March 1943	36 days
6	Kurt Brasack [de]	SS-Standartenführer; Kurt Brasack (1892–1978)	18 March 1943	3 April 1943	16 days
7	Walter Krüger	SS-Gruppenführer; Walter Krüger (1890–1945)	3 April 1943	23 October 1943	203 days
8	Heinz Lammerding	SS-Brigadeführer; Heinz Lammerding (1905–1971)	23 October 1943	20 January 1945	1 year, 89 days
-	Christian Tychsen	SS-Obersturmbannführer; Christian Tychsen (1910–1944); Acting	24 July 1944	28 July 1944 †	4 days
-	Otto Baum	SS-Oberführer; Otto Baum (1911–1998); Acting	28 July 1944	23 October 1944	87 days
9	Karl Kreutz	SS-Standartenführer; Karl Kreutz (1909–1997)	20 January 1945	4 February 1945	15 days
10	Werner Ostendorff	SS-Gruppenführer; Werner Ostendorff (1903–1945)	4 February 1945	9 March 1945	33 days
11	Rudolf Lehmann	SS-Standartenführer; Rudolf Lehmann (1914–1983)	9 March 1945	13 April 1945	35 days
(9)	Karl Kreutz	SS-Standartenführer; Karl Kreutz (1909–1997)	13 April 1945	8 May 1945	25 days

== Organisation ==
Structure of the division in 1943:

- Headquarters
- 2nd SS Panzer Reconnaissance Battalion
- 2nd SS Panzer Regiment
- 3rd SS Panzergrenadier Regiment "Deutschland"
- 4th SS Panzergrenadier Regiment "Der Fuhrer"
- 2nd SS Panzer Field Replacement Battalion
- 2nd SS Panzer Engineer Battalion
- 2nd SS Panzer Artillery Regiment
- 2nd SS Panzer Tank Destroyer Battalion
- 2nd SS Panzer Anti-Aircraft Battalion
- 2nd SS Panzer Rocket Launcher Battalion
- 2nd SS Panzer Signal Battalion
- 2nd SS Panzer Divisional Supply Group

== See also ==
- List of Waffen-SS divisions
- SS Panzer Division order of battle
