= List of massacres in France =

The following is a list of massacres that have occurred in France (numbers may be approximate):

== Celtic Gaul ==
Name	Date	Location	Deaths	Perpetrators	Notes
1st Cenabum massacre	53 BC	Cenabum	Unknown	Carnutes	Carnutes massacre Roman civilians and soldiers
2nd Cenabum massacre	53 BC	Cenabum	Unknown	Roman army	Julius Caesar's soldiers massacre the population of Cenabum.
Siege of Avaricum	52 BC	Avaricum	39,200	Roman army	Julius Caesar's soldiers massacre the population of Avaricum.

== Roman Gaul ==
Name	Date	Location	Deaths	Perpetrators	Notes
Sack of Metz	7 April 451	Metz	Unknown	Huns	City sacked and burned and all inhabitants killed by Hun troops under Attila.

== Merovingian Francia ==
Name	Date	Location	Deaths	Perpetrators	Notes
Vienne massacre	501	Vienne	Unknown	Forces of Gundobad and Godegisel	Townspeople slaughtered during battle between competing Burgundian factions. Hostile Gallo-Roman senators and Godegisel's supporters executed by Gundobad's troops.
Saint-Bertrand-de-Comminges massacre	585	Saint-Bertrand-de-Comminges	Unknown	Kingdom of Orléans	All inhabitants, including priests, put to the sword by royal troops of Guntram

== Carolingian Francia ==
Name	Date	Location	Deaths	Perpetrators	Notes
Siege of Clermont (761)	761	Clermont	Unknown	Royal Frankish Army	Men, women and children burned alive by Frankish army of King Pepin the Short.
Sack of Nantes	24 June 843	Nantes	Unknown	Vikings	Town population and monks massacred and burned alive in a church by raiding Vikings. Others captured as slaves.
Marmoutier massacre	853	Marmoutier Abbey	126	Vikings	126 monks killed by Vikings. 20 survivors escaped.

== Capetian France ==
Name	Date	Location	Deaths	Perpetrators	Notes
Orléans heresy	28 December 1022	Orléans	10–20	Robert II the Pious	10–20 priests, nuns and lay people burned at the stake on orders of King Robert II of France
Rouen massacre	September 1096	Rouen	Unknown	Crusaders	Jews of Rouen rounded up in the synagogue and systematically massacred by Crusaders
Tournai-sur-Dive massacre	1105	Tournai-sur-Dive	45	Troops of Robert of Bellême	45 people burned alive in a church by forces of Robert of Bellême
Bougy-sur-Risle massacre	1136	Romilly-la-Puthenaye	Unknown	Troops of Waleran and Robert de Beaumont	Men and women burned alive in a church by forces of Waleran and Robert de Beaumont
Vitry massacre	1142	Vitry-en-Perthois	1,300	Royal Army	1,300 people burned alive in a church by forces of King Louis VII of France
Ham massacre	1143	Ham	150	Unknown	150 Jews massacred
Vézelay massacre	1167	Vézelay	7	Abbot of Vézelay	Seven Burgundian Cathars burned at the stake
Blois massacre	26 May 1171	Blois	31	Soldiers of Theobald V, Count of Blois	31 Jews, including 17 women, locked in and burned alive in a house by Theobald V, Count of Blois on accusations of blood libel
Bray-sur-Seine massacre	18 March 1192	Bray-sur-Seine	80	Royal Army	80 Jews burned by French troops, acting on command of King Philip II of France
Massacre at Béziers	22 July 1209	Béziers	20,000	Crusaders	First major military action of the Albigensian Crusade.
Siege of Minerve	22 July 1210	Minerve	140	Crusaders	Cathars burned at the stake by Crusaders.
Alayrac massacre	1210	Alayrac	Unknown	Crusaders	Stronghold garrison captured and massacred by Crusaders
Lavaur massacre	3 May 1211	Lavaur	480	Crusaders	80 knights hanged and stabbed to death, 400 Cathars burned by Crusaders
Les Cassés massacre	20 May 1211	Les Cassés	60–94	Crusaders	60–94 Cathars burned alive by Simon de Montfort's Crusaders
Saint Marcel massacre	12 May 1212	Saint–Marcel	28	Crusaders	28 male civilians killed or drowned by Crusaders
Lavelanet massacre	1212	Lavelanet	Unknown	Crusaders	Inhabitants put to the sword by Crusader forces under Guy de Montfort, Lord of Sidon
Moissac massacre	8 September 1212	Moissac	300	Crusaders	300 garrison soldiers executed without trial by Crusaders
Pujol massacre	May 1213	Sainte-Foy-d'Aigrefeuille	60	Toulousain militia	60 Crusaders killed in Pujol Castle by mob of soldiers under Roger-Bernard
Casseneuil massacre	18 August 1214	Casseneuil	Unknown	Crusaders	Population and garrison massacred
Massacre at Marmande	10 June 1219	Marmande	5,000	Royal Army	All men, women and children in the town killed with swords and the town razed and burned to the ground by royal army under prince Louis.
Labécède massacre	1227	Labécède	Unknown	Crusaders	Men killed and Cathar Perfect burnt to death by Crusader forces of Humbert V de Beaujeu
Moissac massacre	1234	Moissac	210	Papal Inquisition	210 Cathars burned at the stake by Inquisitors William Arnald and Peter Seila
Jewish massacres	July 1236	Poitou, Anjou and Brittany	2,500–3,000	Crusaders	Jews killed by Crusaders
Montwimer massacre	29 May 1239	Montwimer	183	Papal Inquisition/Crusaders	183 Cathars burned at the stake by Robert le Bougre and Thibaut IV of Champagne
Carcassonne massacre	8 September 1240	Carcassonne	33	Army of Raymond II Trencavel	33 clerics massacred by forces of Trencavel after being promised safe passage from the besieged city.
Avignonet massacre	28 May 1242	Avignonet	11	Cathars	Two Inquisitors and their nine followers massacred in their sleep by Cathar rebels under Pierre-Roger de Mirepoix
Siege of Montségur	16 March 1244	Château de Montségur	210–215	Royal Army	Cathars burned in a bonfire by the Royal Army.
Agen massacre	1249	Agen	80	Papal Inquisition	80 heretics burned at the stake
Dijon massacre	1251	Dijon	139	Shepherd Crusaders	139 Jews massacred
Troyes massacre	24 April 1288	Troyes	13	Papal Inquisition	13 Jews burned at the stake by the Inquisition, supported by King Philip IV of France
Castelsarrasin massacre	12 June 1320	Castelsarrasin	152	Shepherd Crusaders	152 Jews massacred by Pastoureaux
Toulouse massacre	15 June 1320	Toulouse	115–150	Shepherd Crusaders	115–150 Jews massacred by Pastoureaux
Vitry massacre	1321	Vitry-en-Perthois	77	Unknown	77 Jews massacred during the 1321 leper scare. Forty Jews imprisoned and committed mass suicide.
Chinon massacre	21 August 1321	Chinon	120–160	Royal authorities	120–160 Jews burned at the stake on accusation of well poisoning

== Valois France ==
Name	Date	Location	Deaths	Perpetrators	Notes
Battle of Caen (1346)	26 July 1346	Caen	2,500–3,000	English forces	Thousands killed during the sack of the town by a force of 12,000 troops led by Edward III of England
Toulon massacre	13 April 1348	Toulon	40	Mob	Jewish community of Toulon killed as part of the Black Death Jewish persecutions
Jacquerie	June 1358	Northern France	20,000	Peasants, aristocracy and nobility	Peasant Jacquerie rebels massacre hundreds of noblemen, women and children. Some 20,000 peasants are in turn exterminated by nobles
Siege of Limoges	19 September 1370	Limoges	200–400	English forces	Hundreds of civilians killed during a sack of the town by 3,200 troops under the command of Edward the Black Prince
Benon castle massacre	September 1372	Poitou	Unknown	Royal Army	English garrison of Benon castle summarily executed by French troops led by Bertrand du Guesclin
Maillotins Revolt	3 March 1382	Paris	30	Maillotins	30 people, including 16 Jews, killed by mob
Battle of Agincourt	25 October 1415	Caen	Unknown	English forces	French prisoners of war executed during the battle by troops under the command of Henry V of England
Siege of Caen (1417)	4 September 1417	Caen	1,800–2,000	English forces	Between 1,800 and 2,000 civilians rounded up in the town marketplace and killed by troops led by Henry V of England, despite his orders against doing so
Paris massacres	12 June 1418; 21 August 1418	Paris	1,000–5,000	Parisian mob	Armagnacs slaughtered by Parisian mob
Siege of Rougemont	1421	Rougemont	60	English forces	French garrison hung or drowned on the orders of Henry V of England
Sézanne massacre	24 June 1424	Sézanne	Unknown	English forces	Most inhabitants of the town killed during the sack of Sézanne by troops under the command of Thomas Montagu, 4th Earl of Salisbury
Battle of Jargeau	12 June 1429	Jargeau	Unknown	Royal Army	English prisoners executed by French troops under Joan of Arc and John II, Duke of Alençon
Siege of Chaumont	1434	Chaumont	100	Burgundian Army	Garrison hanged by Philip the Good
Vicques massacre	August 1434	Vicques	Unknown	Mercenaries in English service	Mercenaries in English service kill a large number of Normans
Lihons massacre	February 1440	Lihons	300	English forces	300 men, women and children burned alive in a church by troops led by John Talbot after refusing to surrender
Nesle massacre	14 June 1472	Nesle	Unknown	Burgundian Army	Entire population of Nesle slaughtered and town razed to the ground by Burgundian Army under Duke Charles the Bold
Lectoure massacre	5 March 1473	Lectoure	Unknown	Royal Army	Population massacred and city looted, burned and methodically razed to the ground by royal troops under Cardinal Jean Jouffroy. Defeat of the house of Armagnac.
Avesnes massacre	11 June 1477	Avesnes	Unknown	Royal Army	Civilian population completely exterminated and city destroyed by royal troops under Antoine de Chabannes
Massacre of Mérindol	April 1545	Mérindol	3,000	Provençal/Papal troops	3,000 Waldensians killed on order of Francis I of France. 670 sold as slaves, crops destroyed, herds killed and unknown number of peasants starved to death
Amboise conspiracy	19 March 1560	Château d'Amboise	1,200–1,500	Royal Army	1,200–1,500 Protestant conspirators executed en masse
Cahors massacre	19 November 1561	Cahors	40–50	Catholics	Huguenots burned alive in their place of worship by Catholics
Grenade massacre	November 1561	Grenade	Unknown	Catholics	Huguenots massacred by Catholics
Carcassonne massacre	15 December 1561	Carcassonne	8	Catholics	3 Huguenots and 5 non-religious people massacred by Catholics
Massacre of Vassy	1 March 1562	Wassy	80	Catholics	Murder of Huguenots by forces of the Duc de Guise.
Castelnaudary massacre	22 March 1562	Castelnaudary	60	Catholics	Huguenots burned alive in their place of worship by Catholics.
Massacre of Sens	12 April 1562	Sens	100	Catholics	100 Huguenots tied to poles and drowned by Catholics
Orange massacre	6 May 1562	Orange	Unknown	Catholics	Population massacred by Catholics
Gaillac massacre	18 May 1562	Gaillac	60–80	Catholics	Huguenots captured and thrown in the river by Catholics
Mornas massacre	July 1562	Mornas	200	Protestants	200 soldiers executed by Protestants
Tours massacre	15 July 1562	Tours	200	Catholics	200 Huguenots bludgeoned to death and thrown in the Loire by Catholics
Lauzerte massacre	15 August 1562	Lauzerte	94	Catholics	94 Huguenots burned alive in a church by Catholics.
Bar-sur-Seine massacre	24 August 1562	Bar-sur-Seine	300	Catholics	Catholic soldiers massacre 300 people after reconquering the citadel from the Huguenots
Michelade	30 September 1567	Nîmes	80–90	Protestants	Catholics killed by Protestants
Bondeville massacre	18 March 1571	Notre-Dame-de-Bondeville	40	Catholics	Protestants attacked by Catholic crowd. 40 killed.
St. Bartholomew's Day massacre	24 August 1572	Paris	5,000–30,000	French state/Catholics	Huguenots (French Protestants) were massacred
Aups massacre	16 August 1574	Aups	18	Protestants	18 killed by Protestant troops. Town looted and burned.
First Issoire massacre	15 October 1575	Issoire	Unknown	Protestants	Catholics killed by Protestant troops under Matthieu Merle. Town looted.
Second Issoire massacre	12 June 1577	Issoire	3,000	Royal Army	3,000 surrendering Protestants massacred by royal troops under Francis, Duke of Anjou following orders from King Henry III of France. Town razed.
Cuers massacre	10 April 1579	Cuers	600	Peasant rebels	600 nobles and gentlemen massacred by peasants
Mende massacre	25 December 1579	Mende	300	Protestants	300 Catholic townspeople massacred, mostly in the cathedral, by Protestant troops under Matthieu Merle
Romans massacre	16 February 1580	Romans-sur-Isère	20	Local patricians	20 people massacred by patricians
Moirans massacre	26 March 1580	Moirans	1,000	Royal Army	1,000 peasants massacred by royal troops
Réquista massacre	June 1581	Réquista	Unknown	Catholics	Catholics kill Protestants

== Bourbon France ==
Name	Date	Location	Deaths	Perpetrators	Notes
Battle of Craon	24 May 1592	Craon, Mayenne	Unknown	Spanish Empire; Catholic League	English prisoners executed
Siege of Fort Crozon	19 November 1594	Pointe des Espagnols	Unknown	English forces	Spanish soldiers and civilian summarily executed
Capture of Ham (1595)	22 June 1595	Ham, Somme	Unknown	Royal Army	Spanish garrison massacred.
Siege of Doullens	July 1595	Doullens	4,000	Army of Flanders	Garrison and civilian population killed
La Châtaigneraie massacre	13 August 1595	La Châtaigneraie	31	Catholics	31 Protestants out of 230 massacred by 45 cavalrymen
Siege of Nègrepelisse	11 June 1622	Nègrepelisse	800	Royal Army	All inhabitants of the Huguenot stronghold killed, all women raped and the town looted and burned to the ground on order of King Louis XIII
Massacre at the Hôtel de Ville	4 July 1652	Hôtel de Ville, Paris	150	Parisian mob	150 people, including judges, massacred by a mob during the Fronde
Serre massacre	19 February 1689	Saint-Genest-Lachamp	Unknown	Royal Army	Protestant gathering massacred by royal troops. 400 killed and wounded.
Belvezet massacre	5 January 1703	Belvezet	20–25	Camisards	20–25 inhabitants massacred by Camisards
Chamborigaud massacre	17 February 1703	Chamborigaud	26	Camisards	26 Catholics massacred by Camisards
Fraissinet massacre	26 February 1703	Fraissinet-de-Fourques	33	Camisards	33 inhabitants massacred by Camisards
Moulin de l’Agau massacre	1 April 1703	Nîmes	21–50	Royal Army	21–50 Protestants locked in a barn and burned alive by royal troops
Valsauve massacre	5 July 1703	Verfeuil	16–17	Camisards	16–17 Catholics massacred by Camisards
Potelières massacre	12 September 1703	Potelières	22–31	Camisards	22 Catholics massacred by Camisards
Saint-Sériès massacre	20 September 1703	Saint-Sériès	11	Camisards	11 Catholics massacred by Camisards
Saturargues massacre	20 September 1703	Saturargues	59	Camisards	59 Catholics massacred by Camisards
Sainte-Cécile-d'Andorge massacre	11 October 1703	Sainte-Cécile-d'Andorge	9	Camisards	9 Catholics massacred by Camisards
Branoux massacre	30 October 1703	Branoux-les-Taillades	47–52	Catholic vigilantes	47–52 inhabitants massacred by 600–700 Catholic vigilantes
Cévennes massacres	January 1704	Cévennes	600	Royal Army	Over 600 people massacred in a rampage by royal troops under general Planque.
Franchassis massacre	24 February 1704	Pranles	Unknown	Royal Army	All inhabitants killed by royal troops under general Julien. Village looted, burned and razed to the ground.
Cévennes massacres	April 1704	Cévennes	1,000	Royal Army/Catholic vigilantes	Over 1,000 people massacred by 4,000 royal troops and Catholic vigilantes under Lieutenant General marquis La Lande.
Villars' terror campaign	August 1704	Cévennes	Unknown	Royal Army	Dozens of villages burned and their inhabitants massacred by royal forces under Marshal Claude Louis Hector de Villars
Vernoux massacre	12 December 1745	Vernoux	30	Bourgeois militia/Royal Army	30 Protestants killed by bourgeois militia and soldiers

== Revolutionary and Imperial France ==
Name	Date	Location	Deaths	Perpetrators	Notes
Senlis attack	13 December 1789	Senlis, Oise département	27 (+41 injured)	Louis Michel Rieul Billon	Louis Michel Rieul Billon attacked a parade murdering 26 people and wounding 41 others, before being lynched by soldiers
Champ de Mars massacre	17 July 1791	Paris	12–50	Royal Army	12–50 republicans killed by royalist troops under Gilbert du Motier, Marquis de Lafayette
Massacres of La Glacière	17 October 1791	Avignon	60	Patriots	60 papists massacred by patriots
September Massacres	September 1792	Paris	1,500	National Guard	Multiple massacres with varying death tolls during French Revolution
First Massacre of Machecoul	11 March 1793	Machecoul	200	Catholic and Royal Army	Royalist rebels massacre Republican civilians and soldiers
First Battle of Noirmoutier	12 October 1793	Noirmoutier	200	Catholic and Royal Army	Republican prisoners executed by rebels
Drownings at Nantes	November 1793 / February 1794	Nantes	4,800	French Revolutionary Army	Multiple massacres by drownings by revolutionaries
Avranches massacre	21 November 1793	Avranches	800	French Revolutionary Army	800 counter-revolutionary rebels executed by firing squad.
Lyon Revolt	4 December 1793	Lyon	60	French Revolutionary Army	60 rebels massacred by soldiers
Lyon Revolt	5 December 1793	Lyon	209	French Revolutionary Army	209 rebels massacred by soldiers
Battle of Savenay	December 1793	Savenay	663–2,000	French Revolutionary Army	Rebel prisoners executed by Republicans
Infernal columns	January 21–May 17 1794	Vendée	20,000 - 50,000	French Revolutionary Army	A series of massacres in an area previously affected by the Royalist uprising.
Thermidorian Reaction	28 July 1794	Paris	169	Thermidorians	169 Robespierrists, Communards and Montagnards executed by Thermidorians
Lyon massacre	4 April 1795	Lyon	99	Mob	99 Jacobin prisoners killed by rioters
Aix-en-Provence massacre	11 May 1795	Aix-en-Provence	30	Mob	30 Jacobin prisoners killed
Fort Saint-Jean massacre	5 June 1795	Lyon	100	Mob	100 Jacobin prisoners out of 127 killed by armed band
Plot of the rue Saint-Nicaise	24 December 1800	Paris	22 (+50 injured)	Chouannerie Royalists	Failed Royalist assassination attempt by bombing on First Consul Napoleon

== Bourbon Restoration ==
Name	Date	Location	Deaths	Perpetrators	Notes
Second White Terror	1815	Nationwide	300–500	Royalists	Royalist mobs kill 300–500 people

== July Monarchy ==
Name	Date	Location	Deaths	Perpetrators	Notes
Massacre of rue Transnonain	13 April 1834	Paris	12	National Guard	Insurrectionists and civilians killed by the National Guard in Rue Transonain number 12.
Attentat de Fieschi	28 July 1835	Paris	18 (+22 injured)	Giuseppe Marco Fieschi	Attempted assassination of King Louis Philippe I with volley gun
Massacre of Boulevard des Capucines	23 February 1848	Paris	52–65	French Army	Regular soldiers fire on crowd during the French Revolution of 1848

== Second Republic ==
Name	Date	Location	Deaths	Perpetrators	Notes
Rouen riots	April 1848	Rouen	59	French Army	Insurrection suppressed after 59 rioters were killed by soldiers
June Days uprising	June 1848	Paris	1,500–3,000	French Army	Suppression of June Days uprising. 1,500–3,000 rebels summarily executed and 12,500 arrested, of whom 4,500 deported to Algeria.

== Second Empire ==
Name	Date	Location	Deaths	Perpetrators	Notes
Orsini affair	14 January 1858	Paris	8 (+102 injured)	Felice Orsini	Attempted assassination of Emperor Napoleon III by Italian revolutionary
Fusillade d'Aubin	8 October 1869	Aubin, Aveyron	14 (22 wounded)	French Army	French soldiers fire on striking miners.
Passavant massacre	25 August 1870	Passavant-en-Argonne	49	Prussian Army	49 Garde Mobile prisoners of war shot by Prussian troops

== Third Republic ==
Name	Date	Location	Deaths	Perpetrators	Notes
Suppression of the Paris Commune	May 1871	Paris	6,000–20,000	French Army	Prisoners shot by the army of the Versailles government
Hostage shooting during the Paris Commune	24 May 1871	Paris	6	Paris Commune	Six hostages, including Archbishop Georges Darboy shot by members of the National Guard of the Paris Commune.
Fusillade de Fourmies	1 May 1891	Fourmies	9 (+35 injured)	French Army	French troops shot at peaceful strikers during the International Workers' Day
Carmaux mining company bombing	8 November 1892	Paris	5	Émile Henry	Five police officers killed by bomb planted by anarchist Émile Henry.
Massacre of Italians at Aigues-Mortes	17 June 1893	Aigues-Mortes	17 (+150 injured)	French villagers and labourers	Italian migrant workers massacred by French mob
Revolt of Saint-Joseph	23 October 1894	Saint-Joseph Island, Salvation Islands. French Guiana	14 (2 injured)	French colonial administration, French army	Massacre of the anarchists convicts in the penal colony
Gerbéviller massacre	24 August 1914	Gerbéviller	64	Imperial German Army	64 civilians killed by German soldiers, including 15 mutilated or burned alive.
6 February 1934 crisis	6 February 1934	Place de la Concorde, Paris	16 (+2000 injured)	French police	French police shot at far-right demonstrators, mostly members of Action Française
Assassination of Alexander I of Yugoslavia	9 October 1934	Marseille	6 (+5 injured)	Vlado Chernozemski	Bulgarian revolutionary Vlado Chernozemski shoots King Alexander I of Yugoslavia and French foreign minister Louis Barthou

== Second World War ==
Name	Date	Location	Deaths	Perpetrators	Notes
Abbeville massacre	20 May 1940	Abbeville	22	French Army	French soldiers shot a number of Flemish nationalists and members of the Belgian Communist Party as the German army cut off the area during the Battle of France
Le Paradis massacre	27 May 1940	Le Paradis village, commune of Lestrem, Northern France	97 (+2 injured)	SS Totenkopf	shooting of British POWs by German troops (SS Totenkopf)
Wormhoudt massacre	28 May 1940	Wormhoudt	80 (+15 injured)	Leibstandarte SS Adolf Hitler	shooting of British and French POWs by German troops (SS Adolf Hitler)
Bois d'Eraine massacre	11 June 1940	Cressonsacq	~74	Infantry Regiment Großdeutschland	Senegalese Tirailleurs and their white officers executed by Infantry Regiment Großdeutschland.
Clamecy massacre	18 June 1940	Clamecy	40	German forces	shooting of African POWs by German troops
Karl Hotz reprisals	22 October 1941	Châteaubriant, Nantes, Paris	48	German forces	48 French hostages executed as reprisal for the French resistance killing of Karl Hotz
Ascq massacre	1 April 1944	Ascq, France	86	12th SS Panzer Division Hitlerjugend	murder of French civilians by German troops (SS Hitlerjugend)
Audouville massacre	6 June 1944	Audouville-la-Hubert	30	101st Airborne Division	30 Wehrmacht prisoners of war executed by US paratroopers
Ardenne Abbey massacre	June 1944	Ardenne Abbey	20	12th SS Hitlerjugend	20 Canadian POWs massacred by 12th SS Hitlerjugend
Tulle massacre	9 June 1944	Tulle, Corrèze	120 killed, 149 deported	2nd SS Panzer Division Das Reich	murder and deportation to Dachau of French civilians by German troops (SS Das Reich)
Oradour-sur-Glane massacre	10 June 1944	Oradour-sur-Glane	642	2nd SS Panzer Division Das Reich	murder of French civilians by German troops (SS Das Reich)
Graignes massacre	11 June 1944	Graignes, Manche	61	17th SS Panzergrenadier Division	17 American POWs were bayonetted and shot to death and 44 French civilians accused of assisting the Americans were shot by German troops.
Meymac massacre	12 June 1944	Graignes, Manche	48	French Resistance	47 German soldiers and 1 French woman accused of collaboration executed by French Resistance
Dun-les-Places massacre	28 June 1944	Dun-les-Places	27	German security forces	27 villagers taken as hostages and executed by German forces
Dortan Massacre	12 July 1944	Dortan	35	Freiwilligen-Stamm-Division	35-36 villagers arrested, tortured, raped and executed by German forces
Tragedy of the Guerry's wells	July 1944/August 1944	Savigny-en-Septaine	36	Sicherheitsdienst; Milice	36 Jews slain by Milice under SD command
Penguerec massacre	7 August 1944	Gouesnou	44	Kriegsmarine 3rd anti-air brigade	44 French civilians massacred by Kriegsmarine personnel.
First Saint-Julien massacre	9 August 1944	Saint-Julien-de-Crempse	17	German Army	17 villagers executed by German troops as reprisal for French resistance activity
Bois de Boulogne massacre	16 August 1944	Bois de Boulogne	35	German Army	35 members of the French Resistance executed by German troops
Saint-Genis-Laval massacre	20 August 1944	Saint-Genis-Laval	120	Sicherheitspolizei; Milice	120 prisoners executed by Sipo and Milice
Buchères massacre	24 August 1944	Buchères	68	SS Panzergrenadier Brigade 51	Men of the SS Panzergrenadier Brigade 51 massacred 68 people in a reprisal following an ambush by partisans against the unit
Maillé massacre	25 August 1944	Maillé, Indre-et-Loire	124	17th SS Panzergrenadier Division Götz von Berlichingen	murder of French civilians by German troops (17th SS Panzergrenadier Division Götz von Berlichingen)
Affair of 27 martyrs	25 August 1944	Chatou	27	German forces	27 Frenchmen executed as reprisal for French Resistance attack.
Vallée de la Saulx massacre	28 August 1944	Vallée de la Saulx	86	3rd Panzergrenadier Division	86 French villagers massacred by 3rd Panzergrenadier Division
Second Saint-Julien massacre	10 September 1944	Saint-Julien-de-Crempse	17	French resistance	17 Wehrmacht prisoners of war executed by villagers as revenge for first massacre

== Post-War ==
Name	Date	Location	Deaths	Perpetrators	Notes
Dieppe shooting	10 and 11 June 1945	Dieppe, Seine-Maritime department, Normandy	14 (+9 wounded)	Abd el Maleck	spree killing, captured and executed by firing squad
Massacre of 14 July 1953 in Paris	14 July 1953	Paris	7 (+50 demonstrators, 16 police wounded)	French police	Seven people, including 6 Algerians, killed by French police
1961 Vitry-Le-François train bombing	18 June 1961	Blacy, Marne	24–28 (+132–170 injured)	Organisation armée secrète	Train derailed by OAS explosive, killing up to 28.
1961 Paris massacre	17 October 1961	Paris	40 (government sources) ~200 (opposition sources)	French police	Algerian demonstrators killed by French police.
Charonne Metro Station Massacre	8 February 1962	Charonne	9	French police	CGT Trade union members and communists killed by French police
Bar du Téléphone massacre	3 October 1978	Marseille	10	Armed gunmen	Organized crime war
Sofitel massacre	5 August 1983	Avignon	7	Robbers	Four luxury hotel employees and three customers killed by robbers
Dol massacre	19 June 1985	Ille-et-Vilaine	7	Guy Martel	spree killing
Luxiol massacre	12 July 1989	Luxiol	14	Christian Dornier	spree killing, 3 family members and random inhabitants
Besançon massacre	1 July 1992	Besançon	7 (5 wounded)	Franck Zoritch	spree killing
Cuers massacre	24 September 1995	Cuers	16	Éric Borel	spree killing, 3 family members and random inhabitants, perpetrator committed suicide.
Tours massacre	29 October 2001	Tours	4 (7 wounded)	Jean-Pierre Roux-Durrafourt	4 people killed by Jean-Pierre Roux-Durraffourt
Nanterre massacre	27 March 2002	Nanterre	9 (+19 injured)	Richard Durn	spree killing, perpetrator committed suicide.
Toulouse and Montauban shootings	19 March 2012	Midi-Pyrénées region	7 (+5 injured)	Mohammed Merah	A French radical Islamist man attacks a Jewish school, he murders 3 young children and a rabbi at the school, and also kills 3 French soldiers.
Chevaline massacre	5 September 2012	Chevaline, Haute-Savoie	4	Unknown	3 Britons and 1 Frenchman killed in shooting.
Charlie Hebdo shooting	7 January 2015	Paris	12 (+11 injured)	Chérif and Saïd Kouachi	Two French radical Islamist brothers attack an office, they murder 11 at the office and kill a French police officer on the street.
Hypercacher kosher supermarket siege	9 January 2015	Paris	5 (+11 injured)	Amedy Coulibaly	French radical Islamist attacks a Jewish supermarket and murders 4, a French policewoman is also killed on the street the previous day.
Germanwings Flight 9525 deliberate crash	24 March 2015	Prads-Haute-Bléone, Alpes-de-Haute-Provence	150	Andreas Lubitz	Co-pilot deliberately crashed the plane on the French Alps, killing all passengers and crew.
November 2015 Paris attacks	13 November 2015	Paris	130 (+368 injured)	ISIL	Eight radical Islamists men of ISIL perform coordinated attacks upon the French public at various locations in Paris using assault rifles and explosives;
2016 Nice truck attack	14 July 2016	Nice	86 (+434 injured)	Mohamed Lahouaiej-Bouhlel	A Tunisian/French radical Islamist attacks the French public celebrating Bastille Day, he drives a 19 tonne cargo truck through the public on the street thereby killing indiscriminately.
Carcassonne and Trèbes attack	23 March 2018	Trèbes and Carcassonne	4 (+15 injured)	Redouane Lakdim	Islamist terrorist shoots and stabs four people to death.
2018 Strasbourg attack	11 December 2018	Strasbourg	5 (+12 injured)	Chérif Chekatt (29 years old)	Islamist terrorist shoots five people to death with a revolver and injures several people by stabbing with a knife. Chekatt was killed 2 days later by the police, after a razzia in Strasbourgs district Neudorf. He was shot after opening fire on several police officers.
February 2019 Paris fire	5 February 2019	Paris	10 (+36 injured)	Unknown	Arson at an apartment block.
Paris police headquarters stabbing	3 October 2019	Paris	4 (+2 injured)	Mickaël Harpon	Police employee stab four colleagues to death.
Toulouse summer 2020 attacks	13 July 2020 - 7 September 2020	Toulouse	5 (+3 injured)	Unknown	1 (+1 injured) in September, 2 (+2 injured) in August, 2 in July.

== See also ==
- List of terrorist attacks in France
