= Clara Knecht =

French Alsatian secretary and translator

- Born: Elise-Claire Dubost; 1914; Schiltigheim, France
- Died: likely 25 January 1945 (aged 30–31); Pforzheim, Germany
- Occupation: translator
- Known for: torturing prisoners

Elise-Claire Dubost (1914 – likely 25 January 1945), better known as Clara Knecht or sometimes Klara Knecht, was a French Alsatian secretary and translator, employed during World War II at the Gestapo headquarters in Tours during the German occupation in France. She is known to have carried out cruel and sadistic interrogations using torture on behalf of the Gestapo.

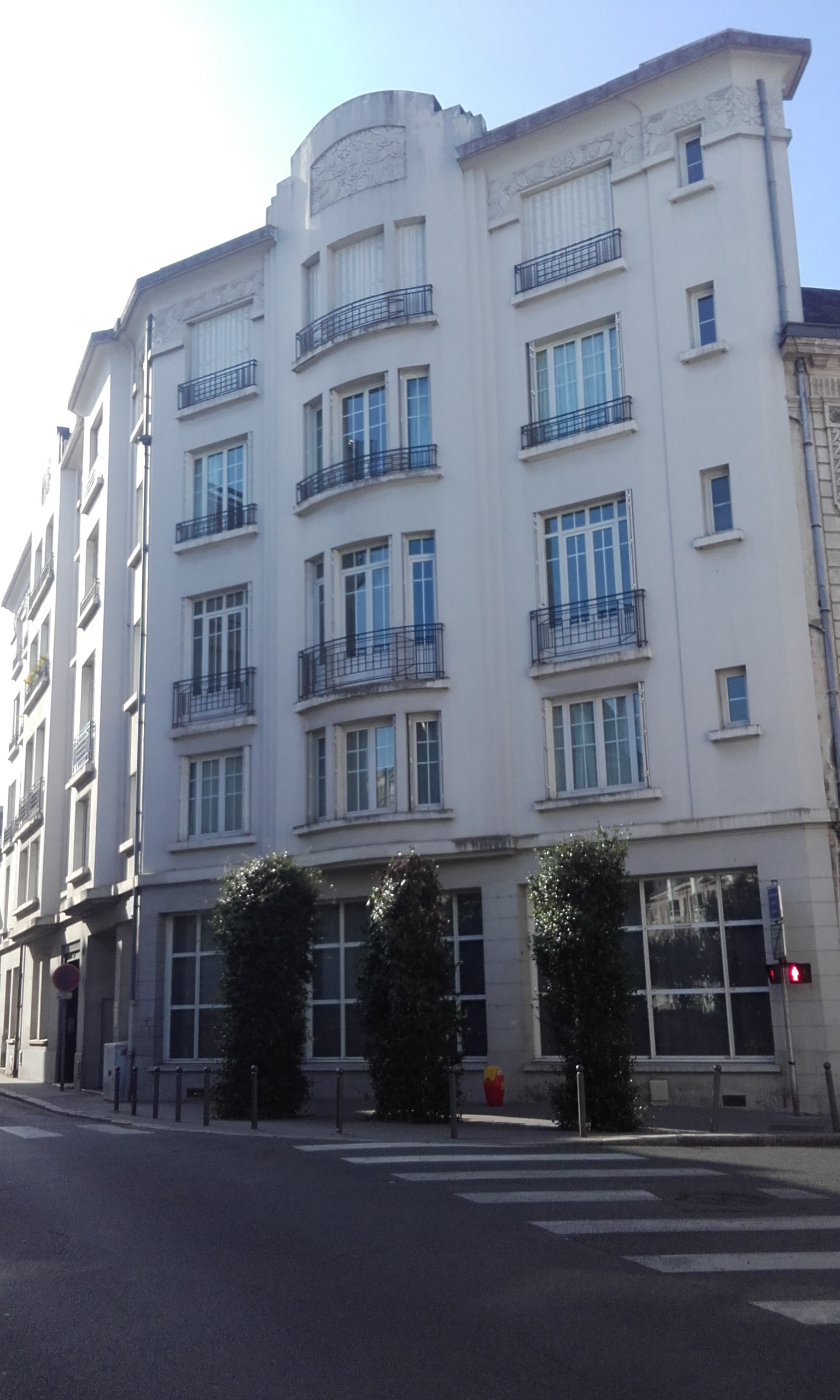
Siège de la Gestapo de Tours pendant l'occupation allemande

== Biography ==
From 1942, Dubost was employed by the Gestapo at 17, rue George-Sand in Tours as an interpreter and thus assisted in the interrogations of people held in the Tours prison under the supervision of Georg Brückle. According to some sources, Georg Brückle and Ditmar Geissler were her lovers. She also lived in the house of the resistance fighter Jean Meunier.

According to the testimonies of Yvette Varvoux and Michel Jeulin, she was a particularly sadistic torturer and was feared by the resistance fighters. She allegedly beat them, tore off their nails, and used an ox nerve with copper straps, which she forced her victims to kiss. She also developed a system of torture using soapy water baths, used in Rennes, and practiced sexual torture.

Allegations propagated after the war in a context of summary justice indicate that she admitted to having killed Abbé Henri Péan in 1944. Marcelle Delaunay and Robert Marquant were also tortured by her according to these same sources.

In August 1944 she was part of the Sipo team that interrogated Yvette Varvoux, even organizing a mock execution on the Montlouis bridge and letting her see her abused and weakened husband in the courtyard before claiming that he had committed suicide with his suspenders. She disappeared at the end of August 1944 after having tortured some maquisards at the Grande Babinière.

Sébastien Cheverau, historian and author of a book on the Maillé massacre, contradicts this analysis in his book and indicated, like André Goupille in his testimony, that it was Dietmar Geissler who murdered Abbé Péan. Clara Knecht, according to him, is :

employed as a translator by the Gestapo, she was a zealous auxiliary, which earned her the evocative nickname of "the bitch".

— Sébastien Cheverau, 5 août 1944, Maillé… Du crime à la mémoire

The newspaper France-Soir gave a long account of the trial of Clara Knecht on 2 and 3 September 1945, emphasizing her great beauty and immense cruelty. She was sentenced to death in absentia on 6 September 1945 by the Indre-et-Loire court of justice, but managed to escape.

Another trial was held in Toulon in 1949, in which, according to allegations propagated by the regional press, she admitted to having killed Abbé Péan and was subsequently interned in a psychiatric hospital, but this was a false Clara Knecht, the real one having disappeared during the Liberation and, according to the French justice system, having died in the bombing of the town of Pforzheim on 25 January 1945.
