= Maurens =

Maurens is the name or part of the name of the following communes in France:

- Maurens, Dordogne, in the Dordogne department
- Maurens, Haute-Garonne, in the Haute-Garonne department
- Maurens, Gers, in the Gers department
- Maurens-Scopont, in the Tarn department
