= Saint-André-des-Eaux =

Saint-André-des-Eaux is the name of the following communes in France:

- Saint-André-des-Eaux, Loire-Atlantique, in the Loire-Atlantique department
- Saint-André-des-Eaux, Côtes-d'Armor, in the Côtes-d'Armor department
