= Massacre of Vassy =

1562 killing of Huguenots in Wassy, France

Coordinates: 48.4990°N 4.9494°E

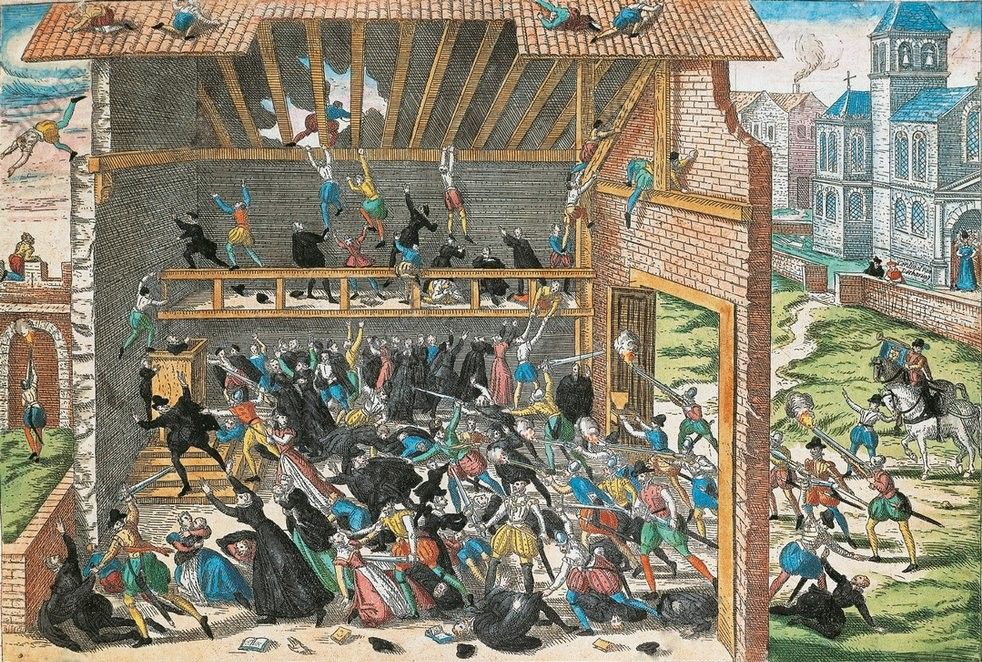
Late 16th century print of the massacre

The Massacre of Vassy (French: massacre de Wassy) was the murder of Huguenot worshippers and citizens in an armed action by troops of the Duke of Guise, in Wassy, France on 1 March 1562. The massacre is identified as the first major event in the French Wars of Religion. The series of battles that followed concluded in the signing of the Peace of Amboise (or Pacification Treaty of Amboise) on 19 March 1563. The events surrounding the Massacre of Vassy were famously depicted in a series of forty engravings published in Geneva seven years later.

== Background ==
=== Religious politics ===
Beginning in the reign of François I, Protestants who followed the teachings of John Calvin, known as Huguenots, faced state-backed persecution in France. This persecution continued under his two successors, Henri II and François II, the latter of whom died young in 1560. Catherine de' Medici, regent of Charles IX, proposed the Edict of January (or Edict of Saint-Germain) with the hopes that providing a measure of toleration to Calvinism would help France avoid further chaos of the kind that had engulfed the south-west of the country. Because the Parlement of Paris resisted registration of the edict until 6 March 1562, it was not in force at the time of the Duke's entry into Wassy.

=== Wassy and the Guise ===
==== Feudal overlords ====
The town of Wassy at the time of the massacre was home to a population of roughly 3,000 and was a royal town. Despite being royal it possessed feudal ties to the House of Guise, having been the Dower of Mary, Queen of Scots, the Duke of Guise's niece. The Guise family also possessed part of the town in the form of the castle district overseen by the Captain Claude Tondeur, in which the Protestant meeting house where the massacre occurred was located. The region at large was the family's power base, with their princely title coming from the seat of Joinville which was located only a few miles away from Wassy. These connections would play a role in Guise's justification for his actions after the fact.

==== The growth of Protestantism ====
Despite its small size, the town saw strong Huguenot activity beginning early. In 1533, Antoinette of Bourbon, the Duke of Guise's mother who managed his estates, oversaw the burning of a man caught preaching in the town. Despite persecution, the community grew, aided by the sister church at Troyes with whom the town had many economic links. In 1561, the community held its first officiated service inside the town in the house of a draper, with an attendance of around 120. As the community continued to grow beyond 500, the pastor of Troyes, Gravelles, performed the town's first baptism on 13 December. The Christmas service was attended by 900, making the town a Huguenot stronghold, with a higher percentage of Huguenots there than in Troyes or any other town in the region. In January 1562, Gravelles departed the town to return to his home, with a dedicated preacher named Léonard Morel being sent out for the town from Calvin's base of Geneva.

==== Attempts at repression ====
This growth was not, however, uncontested. News of public preaching reached Guise in November, and he dispatched several gendarmes to the area to snuff out the heresy, with little success. The town Curé Claude le Sain voiced his concerns about the public preaching to Antoinette, however, she was unwilling to take action without the support of the Duke and the region's provincial governor, the Duke of Nevers, who was a Protestant. In the wake of Gravelle's open baptism, the Cardinal of Lorraine, the Duke of Guise's brother, intervened, sending a delegation under his client the bishop Jerôme Bourgeois to bring the community back into the Catholic fold. His attempt to break up the Protestant service, however, ended in humiliation. He was chased out of the meeting house under insult, which only increased the size of the community by the time of their Christmas service.

== Massacre ==
=== Prelude ===
In the opening months of 1562, France slipped increasingly close to civil war. Conscious of this and anxious to avoid a coalition of German princes in favour of the Huguenot prince of Condé should war break out, the Duke of Guise met with the Duke of Württemberg, promising to promote the confession of Augsburg in France in return for the Duke of Württemberg's neutrality. This achieved, Guise began the return to Paris to which he had been called on 28 February by the kingdom's lieutenant-general, the King of Navarre, to aid him in opposing Catherine's Edict of January.

Stopping on the way at the family seat of Joinville, his mother Antoinette complained to him about the spread of heresy among their estates and urged him to act against it. Setting out from Joinville with 200 gendarmes the next day, Guise intended to stop next at his estates at Éclaron, passing by Wassy to pick up several reinforcement gendarmes that were mustering in the town. Reaching Brousseval a short distance away he heard the church bells of Wassy ringing, at a time in the day which precluded the possibility it was for Mass, enraging him. He summoned a council of his leading gentlemen to decide how to proceed, with the hardline faction of Jacques de la Montaigne [Jacques de l'Aigle de la Montagne] and Jacques de La Brosse leading the council towards intervening in the town. On the pretext of desiring to hear Mass in the town, Guise and his entire gendarme company entered Wassy by the south gate and headed for the church.

=== Massacre ===
Heading towards the church, Guise was further incensed to find that the location of the Protestant meeting house was both so close to the town church and in the castle district which constituted his property. He entered the church, convening with the town's leading opponents of Protestantism, the priest and provost, who urged him to act and disperse the assembly. Heading out towards the meeting house, he sent de La Brosse out ahead of him with two pages to announce his arrival. Inside the barn, 500 worshippers sang psalms. Gaston de La Brosse (son of Jacques) attempted to gain entry to the barn but was resisted by those at the door; overpowering them he began to kill those nearest. The rest of Guise's company now rushed forward, trumpets blaring for the attack, with Guise himself either unwilling or unable to stop what had begun. Many worshippers fled through the hole in the roof, and some others escaping were picked off by sharpshooters, while those who fled down the streets were met by arquebusiers stationed at the cemetery. The pastor Morel was wounded and captured. After an hour the massacre ceased. Of the 500 parishioners, 50 lay dead, of whom five were women and one a child.

== Aftermath ==
=== Word spreads ===
News of the massacre spread quickly both around France and internationally, with tracts printed and woodcuts made for the illiterate from England to the Holy Roman Empire. The exact nature of the events, in particular in relation to whether it had been a Huguenot or a member of Guise's party who had begun the violence at the door, immediately became a source of disagreement between Protestant and Catholic polemics and contemporary histories.

In the Protestant Histoire des Martyres, it was presented as an act of pre-meditated violence on the part of the Catholic men who cried upon entering the temple, "let us kill them all". In Guise's recollections to Christoph, Duke of Württemberg, which formed the basis for the Catholic account, he reported that upon trying to inspect the temple he was resisted, and arquebuses were fired from the inside at his men, who had only swords to defend themselves.

The word massacre, which had previously referred in French to the butcher's block and knife, entered the lexicon with a new meaning.

=== Further massacre and revolt ===
The massacre inspired further religious violence in its immediate wake. On 12 April, the people of Sens massacred over 100 of the town's Huguenots, throwing their corpses into the Seine. Further massacres occurred in Castelnaudary and Bar-sur-Seine in early 1562.

Huguenots involved in the attempted or successful seizure of towns such as Rouen and Troyes asserted that their actions were necessary to prevent themselves being massacred like the parishioners of Wassy.

=== Spiral to war ===
Having committed the massacre, and despite resulting instructions from Catherine to immediately come to court, Guise continued on to Paris, where the Catholic population, upon hearing the news of his actions, gave him a hero's welcome. Catherine, as regent, seeing the dangerous potential of the magnates in the city, ordered him and the leader of the Huguenot party, the Prince of Condé, to vacate Paris, Guise however refused to do so. In response to this and the massacre, Condé marched on Orléans seizing it on 2 April and several days later released a manifesto which in justifying his rebellion cited the "cruel and horrible carnage wrought at Vassy, in the presence of M. de Guise". Several days later at the Calvinist Synod of Orleans he was proclaimed the protector of all Calvinist churches in the kingdom.

=== First French war of religion ===
The major engagements of the war occurred at the Siege of Rouen, the Battle of Dreux and the Siege of Orléans. At the Siege of Rouen (May–October 1562), the crown regained the city, but the King of Navarre died of his wounds. In the Battle of Dreux (December 1562), Condé was captured by the crown and the Constable of France Montmorency, was captured by the rebels. In February 1563, at the Siege of Orléans, Guise was shot and killed by the Huguenot Jean de Poltrot. As he was killed outside of direct combat, the Guise family considered this an assassination on the orders of the Duke's enemy, Admiral Gaspard II de Coligny. The popular unrest caused by the assassination, coupled with the resistance by the city of Orléans to the siege, led Catherine de' Medici to mediate a truce, resulting in the Edict of Amboise on 19 March 1563.

== See also ==
- List of massacres in France
- Massacre of Sens
- St. Bartholomew's Day Massacre
