= Massacre of Sens =

French religious riot in 1562

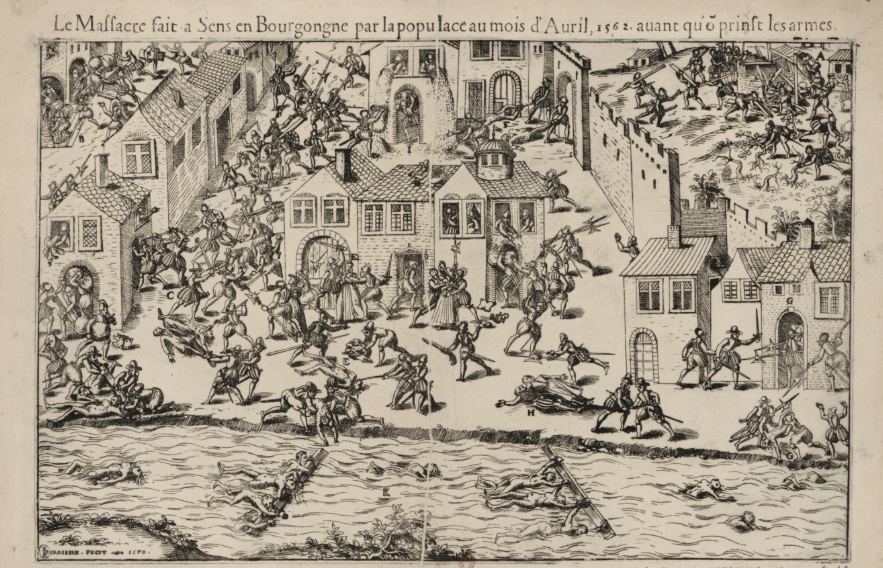
Late sixteenth century Protestant depiction of the massacre as it unfolded, with Huguenots attached to poles and drowned in the Yonne river

The Massacre of Sens was a religious riot that occurred in 1562 during the opening weeks of the French Wars of Religion. With the death of 100 Huguenots, it was one of the most fatal popular massacres of the French Wars of Religion until the St. Bartholomew's Day massacre.

== Background ==
=== Persecution ===
Protestants who followed the teachings of John Calvin, known as Huguenots, had been subject to continued persecution in France since the Affair of the Placards in the reign of King François I. The regency of Catherine de' Medici for her son King Charles IX of France, beginning in 1561, presented the possibility of tolerance. This manifested in the publication of the Edict of Saint-Germain in January 1562 which allowed for freedom of conscience and private worship, and a few sites for public temples.

=== The Huguenots of Sens ===
The community of Huguenots in the City of Sens was small, only 600 people in a city of 16,000, but well established among the religious and legal elite, counting among their number the Provost and the Deacon of the Cathedral. They were likewise well-represented among the middle classes of the town, and much less so in the surrounding rural communities. The community benefited from a degree of organisation, having long had an armed guard to protect their services from potential intrusions.

As a result they contested the nomination of representatives to the Estates General with one Protestant and one Catholic being sent. Further upon the announcement of the Edict of Saint-Germain they sought quickly to petition for a place to worship. The mayor of Sens, a hardline Catholic named Hémard, sought to obstruct this petition, encouraging Catholic preachers to denounce its construction.

=== Wassy and the Road to War ===
On 1 March 1562, François, Duke of Guise stopped at the town of Wassy while travelling to Paris, and encountered a Huguenot congregation. He and his gentlemen committed a massacre. This precipitated the first French War of Religion, with Louis, Prince of Condé citing it in his 8 April Manifesto shortly after he began hostilities with the seizure of Orléans on 2 April. This state of civil war placed Sens in a dangerous environment, while much of the surrounds of Champagne were subject to the Duke of Guise, the Duchy's governor, François II, Duke of Nevers had sworn loyalty to Condé.

== The massacre ==
=== Escalating violence ===
On 29 March, Easter Sunday, Huguenots returning from a church service outside the walls were set upon by boatmen from the nearby settlement of Paron. While they were able to escape, they decided to send away their pastor and cease hosting religious services for safety reasons. Whilst they waited for instructions from the Duke of Nevers on how to proceed, their Catholic opposition in the town moved fast, in the first two weeks of April taking control of first the town artillery and then the gates, forming a militia 150 members strong. On 10 April there would be a meeting of Catholic notables of the town at which the Huguenots historians of the Historie Ecclesiastique would later assert a plan of massacre was devised.

=== The events of 12 April ===
The notables put their plan into action on 12 April, taking advantage of the increase in support from rural pilgrims in the town for the feast of Saint Savinien. In the early hours the mayor ordered the people to tear down the Huguenot church. This accomplished, later in the day after the feast, he ordered the militia to arrest the Protestant leadership of the town, catching them off guard with their Gascon captain Mombaut out of the city for the afternoon. The arrests were incompetently carried out, but when Mombaut returned he gathered the Huguenots together in a fortified house and prepared a defence. The Catholics brought artillery to bear on the house, and in the ensuing hours Mombaut and those with him were killed. The mayor and the militia lost control of the proceedings and a general massacre of the town's Huguenot population ensued, the rural pilgrims from out of town setting themselves upon the burghers, with over 50 houses looted and 100 killed. The authorities sought in vain to re-establish control on 13 April but their orders were ignored. The bodies were thrown into the Yonne, a tributary of the Seine, and several days later Pierre Paschal would report seeing bodies in the river near Paris.

== Aftermath ==
=== Protestant reactions ===
In the wake of Wassy, Huguenot fears of massacre and desire for revenge were further compounded. While Condé had prohibited iconoclasm or the destruction of Catholic temples by his troops upon his entry into Orléans, news of Sens made this unenforceable. In nearby Troyes, news of the massacre would spur the Protestants to desperate action, seizing the gates of the town and holding them for several days before being convinced by the Duke of Nevers to stand down. Over the next several months they would face murder and repression.

=== Catholic consolidation ===
The loss of the Protestant leadership in Sens, and the potential for an anti-crown coup to seize control of the town as was the model elsewhere in France, furthered the Catholic domination of the Champagne region both during and after the first War of Religion which was concluded by the Peace of Amboise on 19 March 1563. Under the influence of the Guise client Nicolas de Pellevé, the town of Sens was an eager adopter of the charter of the Catholic League in the 1570s.

== See also ==
- List of massacres in France
- List of incidents of civil unrest in France
- Massacre of Wassy
- French Wars of Religion
