= Maillé massacre =

Mass murder by Nazis in France

Maillé Massacre
- Part of World War II
- Location: Maillé, Indre-et-Loire, France
- Date: 25 August 1944
- Deaths: 124 killed
- Victim: French civilians
- Perpetrators: Nazi Germany, 17th SS Panzergrenadier Division Götz von Berlichingen

Location of Maillé in France

The Maillé Massacre refers to the murder on 25 August 1944 of 124 of the 500 residents of the commune of Maillé in the department of the Indre-et-Loire. Following an ambush a few days before and in reprisals against activities of the French Resistance, Second Lieutenant Gustav Schlüter and his men organized the massacre and burnt the village. Forty-eight children were among the dead. The SS unit believed to be responsible for the massacre is the SS-Feldersatzbataillon 17 of 17th SS Panzergrenadier Division Götz von Berlichingen (Lieb, 2007). In contrast to Oradour-sur-Glane, the village was rebuilt after the war to its pre-war state.

== Mass killings ==
On the evening of August 24, 1944, skirmishes between the French Forces of the Interior (FFI) and German troops took place near a farm in the commune of Maillé. Gustave Schlüter, commander of the German control post at Sainte-Maure-de-Touraine, mobilized his men and two train-mounted artillery pieces.

The next morning, Maillé was closed off by German forces. One artillery piece was destroyed by the attacking RAF. The first farms were then set on fire and their residents killed. At about noon, the SS entered the village and the systematic killing began. Some wounded who had pretended to be dead were later shot down when they attempted to escape (Chevereau & Forlivesi, 2005; Delahousse, 2008; Payon, 1945).

About 1:00 pm the artillery bombardment began, demolishing the village and any who might have survived the initial onslaught. The soldiers were also there to ensure that survivors were shot on sight. By late afternoon calm returned, and the few survivors could only look upon the spectacle with sadness. The intervention of abbot André Payon was needed so that they could leave to take shelter in neighboring villages.

In less than four hours, entire families were slaughtered by the Waffen SS, many of whose soldiers were only 16 and 17 years old (Chevereau & Forlivesi, 2005; Delahousse, 2008; Payon, 1945).

== Victims ==
- Paul Auger, age 60
- Eugénie Auger, née Deplaix, age 58
- François Audevard, age 41
- Achille Barret, age 37
- Germaine Beck, age 14
- Jean Beck, age 8
- Jacques Beck, age 2
- Yvonne Blanchard, age 17
- Marie Brion, née Boyer, age 60
- Magdeleine Bruneau, née Moreau, age 89
- Suzanne Brunet, née Desale, age 29
- Marcel Brunet, age 6
- Yolande Brunet, age 5
- Jacques Brunet, age 9 months
- Marie Bruzeau, née Poirier, age 30
- Louis Bourguignon, age 74
- Marie-Louise Bouguignon, née Page, age 68
- Edwige Champigny, née Ouvrard, age 37
- Jacques Champigny, age 10
- Jean Champigny, age 4
- Marie Champigny, née Morne, age 73
- Andrée Charpentier, née Rocher, age 35
- Pierre Charpentier, age 10
- Lucien Charpentier, age 20 months
- Jeanne Charret, née Rousseau, age 32
- Nadine Charret, age 10
- Michel Charret, age 11
- Henri Chedozeau, age 53
- Julien Chieppe, age 45
- Charles Chevalier, age 83
- Véronique Chevalier, age 79
- André Chevillard, age 19
- Maria Confolent, née Gambier, age 46
- Pierre Confolent, age 22
- Jehanne Confolent, age 20
- Yves Confolent, age 19
- René Confolent, age 17
- Hélène Confolent, age 14
- Jean Confolent, age 13
- Claude Confolent, age 11
- Henri Coulombeau, age 64
- Joséphine Coulombeau, née Robin, age 58
- Germaine Creuzon, née Page, age 37
- Pierrette Creuzon, age 10
- Gérard Creuzon, age 4
- Monique Creuzon, age 15 months
- Charles Creuzon, age 68
- Jeanne Creuzon, née Terrason, age 67
- Paulette Creuson, age 14
- Théodore Creuzon, age 43
- Fernand Creuzon, age 18
- André Didelin, age 40
- Jeanne Didelin, née Longe, age 38
- Jeannine Didelin, age 18
- Andrée Didelin, age 11
- Charles Didelin, age 10
- Michel Didelin, age 7
- Valérie Fialton, née Sorin, age 60
- Gérard Fialton, age 12
- Jean Fournier, age 6
- Gustave Gabillot, age 51
- Renée Gabillot, née Guiton, age 45
- Marie Gambier, née Bertrand, age 84
- Auguste Glais, age 36
- Pierre Granet, age 56
- Ernest Gouard, age 43
- Renée Gouard, née Brion, age 37
- Camille Gouard, age 11
- René Gouard, age 3
- Henri Guérin, age 51
- Jeanne Guerrier, née Prouteau, age 31
- Michel Guerrier, age 3
- Alexandre Guillochon, age 42
- Renée Guillochon, née Binois, age 37
- Éliane Guillochon, age 10
- Charles Guiton, age 79
- Charles Guiton, age 46
- Robert Guiton, age 30
- Marie Guiton, née Page, age 25
- Yvette Guiton, age 6
- Arlette Guiton, age 4
- Jackie Guiton, age 2
- Colette Guiton, née Blanchard, age 26
- Éliane Guiton, age 6
- Gérard Guiton, age 3
- Germaine Guiton, née Hodin, age 38
- Jacqueline Guiton, age 6
- Anne Guiton, née Voisin, age 77
- Joséphine Hinderscheid, née Raimbault, age 45
- Gisèle Hinderscheid, age 10
- René Jamain, age 36
- Henriette Lerasle, née Renault, age 31
- Claude Lerasle, age 9
- Pierre (ou Charles) Martigue, age 43
- René Martin, age 34
- Renée Martin, née Charpentier, age 29
- Raymond Martin, age 9
- Josiane Martin, age 4
- Danielle Martin, age 6 months
- Marguerite Menanteau, née Delaveau, age 32
- Huguette Menanteau, age 15
- Cyrille Menanteau, age 12
- Edgard Menanteau, age 6
- Mireille Menanteau, age 2
- Hubert Menanteau, age 3 months
- Jules Métais, age 31
- Simone Métais, née Goy, age 24
- Jackie Métais, age 6
- Jeannine Métais, age 4
- Justine Métais, née Méry, age 60
- Annie Meunier, age 4
- Jean Meunier, age 2 and a half
- Paul Millory, age 45
- Jean Millory, age 14
- Monique Pérouze, age 4
- Ernestine Ricottier, née Tartre, age 44
- Joseph Sondag, age 21
- Baptiste Sornin, age 43
- Louise Tard, née Drouard, age 75
- Armand Tartre, age 52
- Justine Tartre, née Cognault, age 71
- Auguste Thermeau, age 44
- Joseph Vincent, age 78
- Désirée Vincent, née Gatillon, age 70

== Commemoration ==
The principal bibliographic resources are the memoirs of abbot André Payon, published for many years by the Conseil Général of the Indre-et-Loire (Payon, 1945).

Since March 9, 2006, a memorial museum, La Maison du Souvenir, has been open to the general public in the Café Métais, in Maillé. The museum shows collections of photos and artifacts commemorating the village of Maillé and those killed during the massacre (Chevereau & Forlivesi, 2005; Delahousse, 2008; Payon, 1945). A German study on German anti-partisan warfare in France during the Second World War revealed some new facts on the possible SS perpetrators (Lieb, 2007).

== Prosecution ==
Gustav Schlüter was condemned in absentia in Bordeaux in 1953, yet he died peacefully at his home in Germany in 1965.

On August 1, 2005, the public prosecutor of Dortmund, Ulrich Maass, reopened the inquiry, resulting in a visit to Maillé in July 2008. It was clarified that Germany has no statute of limitations on war crimes (as long as the accused are Germans or were in the service of the Axis during World War Two), and German judicial system reserves the right of initiative in such cases.

== See also ==
- List of massacres in France
- Oradour-sur-Glane massacre
