= Dol massacre =

Spree shootings in Brittany, France

- Native name: Tuerie de Dol
- Location: Ille-et-Vilaine and Côtes-du-Nord, France
- Date: 19 June 1985; 11:00 – 14:00 (CEST)
- Weapon: Manufrance .22-caliber rifle
- Deaths: 7
- Injuries: 5
- Perpetrator: Guy Martel

On 19 June 1985, a spree shooting took place in eight towns and villages in Ille-et-Vilaine and Côtes-du-Nord, France. Seven people were killed and five others were injured before the perpetrator, 41-year-old Guy Martel, was arrested. He was found not guilty of murder due to his history of mental illness and was involuntarily committed to a mental hospital until his death.

== Shootings ==
On 19 June, at about 10 a.m. Martel was visited by his father Victor at the former's home in Dol-de-Bretagne. As usual, the two spoke briefly through the fence of the garden, with Martel remaining in a deckchair, before the elder Martel left again. Shortly after, Martel retrieved a scoped .22 caliber rifle and a box of ammunition, which he placed in the trunk of his Volvo car, before driving to his father's house in Baguer-Morvan. Finding that his father was not yet home, Martel drove back to Dol-de-Bretagne, first seeking at one of his aunts, who was not at home, and one of his uncles, who was on vacation, before arriving just before 11 a.m. at the home of his uncle, 64-year-old Charles Martel. After a brief conversation, Charles climbed a ladder to pick some cherries, at which point Martel returned to his car, took his rifle from the trunk and shot his uncle three times, wounding him.

Driving away from the scene, Martel remained in Dol-de-Bretagne and headed to an assisted living facility, which he frequently visited for lunch meals. He entered the kitchen and shot at the present cook, Mrs. Lozac'h. She was in the process of turning her head to tell Martel that they were not open yet, due to which she was grazed in the head. Martel told Lozac'h "I will come back later" before leaving and returning to the town centre, wher he stepped into the doctor's office of his personal physician, Dr Launay. Through the waiting room, he opened the door to the office of another doctor, Michel Lhommelet, who was in the process of examining a child patient. Lhommelet was killed on the spot with four gunshots to the back. He next stopped at the sports hall, where he entered the office of the manager, Mrs Le Maréchal; and shot her dead. Martel then drove back to Baguer-Morvan, encountering his father who had just arrived at his house. Martel killed him by shooting him several times. During this time, authorities in Dol-de-Bretagne were alerted to shootings in several locations, leading to a town-wide shutdown, with businesses closing and schools being put on lockdown. Gendarmerie subsequently began their search for the perpetrator.

Martel drove south to Rocher-Aoustin, near Combourg, where he killed another uncle, Joseph Weber, with a single gunshot. In La Chapelle-aux-Filtzméens, Martel shot and killed Jean Chaussonnière, a tourist from Saint-Pierre-du-Regard, also injuring his older brother Eugène. In Saint-Domineuc, Pierre Bourtourault was shot dead while gathering hay at the roadside. In Quebriac, Martel killed 33-year-old Danièle Pomard, who was leaving a friend's house where she had dropped off her two children. Her body was found at 13:35 by garbage collectors.

Near Trévérien, Martel shot and wounded 29-year-old André Rehault on his tractor. He was eventually spotted by a police helicopter and drove into Côtes-du-Nord. On the way, Martel wounded 34-year-old Daniel Lebreton, who was eating lunch in outside his truck near Saint-Judoce, and 40-year-old Bernard Prechoux in Saint-Juvat. Martel also fired at two other adults and a child, but missed. He was apprehended at around 14:00 in Saint-André-des-Eaux by a Dinan Police unit in Saint-André-des-Eaux. He stepped out of his car, hands raised and yelling: "Don't shoot! I am sick!" ("Ne tirez pas! Je suis malade!") and was arrested.

== Victims ==
- Pierre Bourtourault, 74
- Jean Chaussonnière, 60
- Mrs. Le Maréchal
- Michel Lhommelet, 34
- Victor Martel, 65, father of Guy Martel
- Danièle Pomard, 33
- Joseph Weber, 65, uncle of Guy Martel

== Perpetrator ==
Martel being escorted out of the Saint-Malo police station

Guy Alfred Victor Charles Martel was born on 11 June 1944 in Epiniac as one of four children to Amélie Weber and Victor Martel. His father was a member of the garde mobile. After earning a degree in mathematics and chemistry, Martel enlisted in the National Service Cooperation Abroad (CSNE) in a civilian service, through which he became stationed in San José, Costa Rica, in a teaching position. His time there was not recorded, but Martel sometimes stated that he saw "horrible things" and had to perform the duties of someone of higher rank who had been killed. In 1969, Martel was repatriated to France by air ambulance for unknown reasons, although there were rumours that he was taken hostage for three weeks by an armed group, variously described as guerillas or bandits. From then on, Martel complained of chronic intestinal and spinal pain, which he attributed to a virus.

For less than two years, Martel worked as a natural sciences teacher at Henri Matisse, a collège in Issy-les-Moulineaux, quitting in 1972 due to a nervous disorder. He was put on extended sick leave and voluntarily entered stationary treatment at mental institutions three times, once in Paris, and twice in Brittany, and was accorded a degree of disability of 80%. In 1975, Martel was granted a disability pension, moving in with his parents in Baguer-Morvan. His mother died from a heart attack in 1976, at which point his condition worsened, with Martel "seeing hostility everywhere". Martel became increasingly estanged from his father and in 1979, he moved out and bought a house in Dol-de-Bretagne. His aunts commented that Martel often accused them of criticising him behind his back while his house physician Launay stated that his patient regularly denied medications, outright refusing to discuss the possibility of mental health issues, which Launay suspected may have caused psychosomatic symptoms. Martel told Launay that simple activities such as reading, watching television and looking through a telescope were quickly strenuous for him. It was noted that Martel showed no physical issues when playing tennis with the local sports hall manager, Mrs. Le Maréchal, one of the later victims.

In Dol-de-Bretagne, Martel rarely left his home except for lunch, to play tennis or go on short walks. Most of the time, he sat in his garden, where he was regularly visited by his father and an uncle, who tended to the lawn and plants since Martel was easily fatigued. Neighbours knew him for his withdrawn nature and irritable attitude, noting that he hardly socialized, allowing not even his family to enter his house on rare visits, barring a single house call by his doctor, when Martel demanded treatment for a fall from a stepladder. Otherwise, Martel had no visitors and consequently became locally known as "the lonely mister" ("le monsieur tout seul"). He was noted to have a particular aversion to noise, once complaining to a neighbour that he should cut down his young poplar trees, believing that the leaves would be loud during the wind once grown. Martel also disliked children, both for being "noisy and annoying" and since he believed that they made him ill. While regarded as a harmless eccentric, Martel once assaulted his father without provocation by hitting him in the face with a drinking glass and during a more recent incident, when a boy pressed Martel's doorbell and ran away, Martel shouted a death threat at the fleeing figure.

== Aftermath ==
Media dubbed the shooting the Dol massacre (French: Tuerie de Dol).

During questioning in custody, Martel told investigators that he initially intended to commit suicide before deciding to kill his family. According to him, he first targeted family members and other people he knew, but upon realizing that it was "easy to shoot people", he simply continued. ("Au début, je n'avais affaire qu'à ma famille et à quelques autres personnes... Après, j'ai réalisé que c'était facile de tirer. Alors, j'ai continué."). It was reported that the victims familiar to Martel had been targeted by him for "treating him good". A psychiatrist suggested that Martel believed that he had no place in the world due to his invalid status, yet was too afraid to kill himself, instead deciding to kill those whom he deemed responsible for making him feel content with his life before killing more people indiscriminately.

Martel was charged with murder and attempted murder, as well as parricide, which is considered a form of aggravated murder under French law. His trial took place from July to September 1985 at the Saint-Malo Palace of Justice. Martel was put under psychological examination to determine if he was criminally responsible. The court presumed that Martel initially went after family members and acquaintances, with whom he had "trivial grievances", but pointed out that after leaving Combourg, all victims were strangers to him and targeted at random. The public prosecutor's office determined that there was no medical malpractice regarding Martel's previous psychiatric treatment, as he was only treated for depressive disorders and never considered a danger to others. Martel was ultimately found not criminally responsible in accordance with Article 64 of the old French Penal Code and instead confined to a psychiatric facility.

Martel died on 14 November 2015 at a mental hospital in Rennes.

== See also ==
- Luxiol massacre
- Cuers massacre
- Nanterre massacre
