= Michelade =

Massacre during the Second French War of Religion (1567)

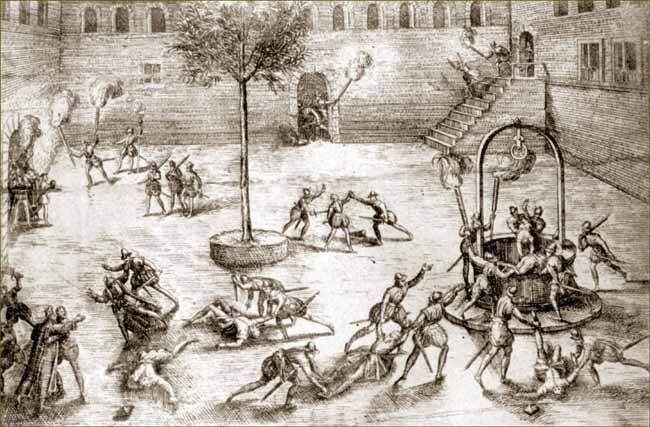
Michelade of Nîmes.

The Michelade (French: [miʃ(ə)lad]; Occitan: Michelada) is the name given to the massacre of Catholics, including 18 Catholic priests and monks, by Protestant coup officials in Nîmes on Michaelmas (29 September) 1567, after the outbreak of the second French War of Religion after the failure of the Surprise of Meaux. The massacre represented one of the largest non-military massacres by Protestants during the civil wars.

== Background ==
=== Town of Nîmes ===
Nîmes was a small town of around 10,000 at the time of the massacre. The occupations of the majority were largely in the wool trade or in agriculture. In 1552, King Henry II granted the town a presidial court increasing its prominence in the area. Présidial judges were the wealthiest and most prestigious citizens in the town and served on the court for life but could resign if they wished to pass the office to their children. The court held a wide jurisdiction by trying many cases. The town council was led by four consuls, with the first reserved for a lawyer, the second for a merchant, the third for an artisan and the fourth for a wealthy farmer. Each council term was for a year, but elections were not direct, with the council selecting a short list each year and the consuls then being chosen by lot from it. There were subsequently repeated accusations of rigging.

In 1557 to 1560, the harvest failed every year. The town leadership tried to navigate this through buying grain to cover the shortfalls, but the task was made more difficult by the crown's imposition of forced loans and taxes during the final years of the Italian Wars. In that environment, Protestantism found many converts, with the first permanent pastor sent over from Geneva in 1559. The Protestants proposed the redirection of money intended for the Mass to poor relief to solve the harvest problem. The elite of Nîmes began to convert in 1560 to 1561, with the town's lawyers in particular joining the ranks of the new religion. That troubled the crown, as the town appeared to lose any zeal in fighting heresy. As a result, royal troops were sent into the town, and they arranged a Catholic-only council election. This unconstitutional power grab further alienated the elite and pushed more into the arms of Protestantism.

=== Protestantism triumphs ===
In early 1561, the Protestants organised cahiers de doléances for the town's response to the Estates General and succeeded in pushing it through the council. In late 1561 the Protestants, now a majority, succeeded in taking over the town's churches, with much of the clergy either fleeing or converting. Seeing how rigged the election was, the crown relented in 1562 and allowed a Protestant slate of candidates. By early 1562, 60% of the 26 Présidial judges had converted to Protestantism. Catholics still made up 40% of the Présidial judges but made up a smaller percentage of the town’s bourgeois and artisans by 1562. In early 1563, the new Protestant consulate began selling off church property. Meanwhile, the Protestant religious leadership, embodied in the consistory, remained bourgeois as opposed to aristocratic.

=== Catholic reaction ===
In mid-1563, Damville, second son of Anne de Montmorency was appointed governor of Languedoc. He arrived in Nîmes with troops on 16 November and soon engineered a coup in favour of the Catholic party. The new consulate would be led by des Georges, a lawyer for the cathedral chapter. He set about re-establishing the Catholic presence in the city, with the mass being recited outside the cathedral every day. He was not insensitive to the precarity of his minority leadership. His council supported the removal of royal troops from the city and felt them an infraction on traditional civic liberty. No attempt was made to compensate the sacked monastery or buy back church property.

When Charles IX passed through on the grand tour of France in 1564 he oversaw a second rigged election with Damville given the choice of candidate he desired for first consul. Damville selected de Gras, another lawyer for the Cathedral chapter. The new consulate was more radical, desiring the reclamation of church property and the removal of Protestants from the Présidial court. The crown refused to pay for the expense of reimbursing all those Protestants who would lose their titular property and so nothing came of that. Still on the tour in Toulouse, Charles IX decreed in March that benefices should be seized from churches that refused to celebrate the mass but also that Protestants should not be excluded from political office. That had little effect in Nîmes, where the Catholics lacked the ability to compel the Protestants to hand over the benefices, and the Protestants lacked the ability to make the council let them participate.

In late 1565, another rigged election saw the more militant Catholics vent their frustration by selecting as their candidate the radical young de Rochette, a church lawyer, with the leadership of des Georges and de Gras, who, in their old age, had too many ties to the Protestant leadership to clamp down on them, being rejected. Mass was re-established in the Cathedral, but many of the canons hired to say it were still too fearful to turn up on the day. In early 1567, the Corpus Christi procession was re-established. The Protestants, eager for compromise, proposed giving the seneschal de Senaterre oversight on the elections and an equally-shared consular leadership, but the Catholics rejected that attempted negotiation. On April 10, conscious of the spiralling political situation in France generally and the south of France in particular, Charles transferred policing powers to the consulate of Nîmes and several other towns, from the Présidial court, which further weakened them.

=== National situation ===
From 1565 to 1567, the national Protestant leadership began to grow increasingly discontent and suspicious of the intentions of the crown. That started with the secret meeting between Catherine de' Medici and the Duke of Alba in Bayonne to discuss marriage alliances, which they interpreted as the formation of a plot to kill them. In 1567, Alba again came north via the Spanish Road on his way to quell a Protestant revolt which had broken out in the Spanish Netherlands. The Huguenots took that as the proof of their fears and began preparing a response. Louis, Prince of Condé and Gaspard II de Coligny then left court, which left it dominated by Catholics. The crown was concerned by that movement itself and hired several thousand Swiss mercenaries to watch over it, which only further escalated the Protestants' paranoia. The readmission of Charles, Cardinal of Lorraine onto the council in August and proposals to modify the Edict of Amboise were only further proof to them.

Accordingly, they began preparing a coup of their own, sending word out to Protestants across France to be ready to seize their towns and mustering cavalry to nearby Meaux, where they intended to seize the King. The assault on the King failed, as he was spirited away by his Swiss guards, but the uprising at Nîmes would proceed as planned.

== Coup ==
=== Preparations ===
The council became increasingly insecure about its situation in the preceding months and appealed to the local commander Guillaume de Joyeuse for aid but found none forthcoming. Further making the situation dangerous were a concurrent surge in the grain price and a dispute in the military command of the town between Captain Bolhargues and Captain La Garde. The council sought to win Bolhargues' favour, courted him at the expense of La Garde and tried to get the latter to quit, a decision they would come to regret. Bolhargues, despite being Catholic, had worked with the Protestants during their leadership in 1562-3. On September 27, D'Acier passed through the town to spread word of the upcoming planned national uprising and met with Pavée in the town. He in turn reached out to Leblanc, a longtime friend of Bolhargues, and tasked Leblanc with bringing Bolhargues over into their camp. With his defection, only the troops of the Chateau would be available to the consuls.

=== Action ===
Beginning the uprising on 29 September, Michelade Day, the Protestant leadership of the town formed a provisional governing committee in which almost all Protestant Présidial judges featured but very little religious Protestant leadership. Indeed, the Protestant consistory would condemn the uprising. To start out, the Protestants marched the streets and intended to intimidate the Catholics into line and gain access to the keys of the gate, and so formed many companies, most lacking military experience. Witnesses record them crying "kill kill kill the papists." The keys were in the possession of Rochette, who fled to his stepfather's house.

A company under de Passaco knocked on the door, but his mother told it that he was absent. Not content with that, Rochette put on his finest robes and made his way to the bishop's palace. He broke down in front of the bishop and said that he did not know what to do. They decided to pray together, where they were discovered when Bolhargues arrived with up to 200 men to arrest them. Their arrest would not be a secure one, and the bishop and his servants would escape through a hole in the wall into the house of a friendly Protestant, de Bruegs. When the Protestant forces came to de Bruegs' house seeking the bishop, he negotiated a ransom for the bishop and several servants, of 60 écus and lesser amounts respectively, and they were dumped outside the town walls. L'Hermide went with a company of men to the house of de Gras and told him that they needed to have a conversation. He complied and came with the company.

Of the 16 who had served as consuls from 1564-1567, eight would be targeted for arrest and of the nine Catholic Présidial judges, seven would be targeted similarly. The prisoners were kept in the town hall and Calviere and L'Hermite's house. Some of the prisoners were kept unfed for a day in an abattoir in an attempt to intimidate them.

== Massacre ==
On the night of September 30, groups of soldiers removed some of the prisoners from their various holding places, in accordance with lists that had been drawn by the leadership of the committee. Among those to be executed were de Gras and de Rochette. The assorted prisoners were taken to the courtyard of the bishop's palace in which a well was situated and were killed there with swords, daggers and pistols, with some of their bloodied bodies dumped in the well. Witnesses claimed that d'Estenet and L'Hermite were among those who did the work of killing and that men of lower class than the aristocratic judicial leadership that had drawn up the kill orders. The majority of the 37 known victims would be priests, at 18 executions, with only 2 of the 8 arrested consuls executed, and 1 of the 7 arrested Présidial judges, after he had tried to flee prior. Six artisans would be executed, and 6 lesser lawyers.

It can be fairly confidently stated by the numbers that the violence was in large part within the elite, which made it likely that all of the victims had names that would have been recollected by witnesses later and notable enough to receive attention from the investigators. Also notable was that only adult men were targeted for execution although several prominent women were arrested during the coup. Performance of the mass appears to have been the act most likely to result in death, as was in line with Protestant killings elsewhere, which tended to target priests.

== Aftermath ==
Despite the confidence of the coup plotters that the people would obey them, they were keen to avoid putting their deeds in writing and performed the massacre secretly in the night. The killing was ultimately counterproductive to their goals by delaying their assault on the chateau, and thus losing any semblance of surprise they might have had. As such the chateau was able to hold out for six weeks, with la Garde commanding inside. With relief not forthcoming from Tarascon, the situation became dire, with Calviere overseeing Catholics digging trenches outside the Chateau for besieging. On Nov 10 with food too low, a surrender was negotiated. The captain and his 9 soldiers could depart the city under arms, the rest of the soldiers would be restricted to possession of daggers. All sheltering Catholics would be allowed to live in safety, or leave the town as they desired.

While the siege was ongoing, the Messieurs who led the coup set about remaking the sacred geography of the town, all churches with the exception of Saint-Eugenie were destroyed, and the furniture in them burned. Extortionate taxes were levelled, both generally on the population and specifically on the Catholics alongside looting of several Catholic residences. In the days following the massacre many of the rest of the prisoners, suitably intimidated, were released back to their homes, due to a lack of interest in killing them, and a desire to have them as taxable subjects.

In June 1568, royal troops re-entered the town as the second civil war ended. In March 1569 the Parlement of Toulouse, having conducted an investigation into what transpired with Catholic witnesses/survivors, condemned 100 Protestants to death, including many only tangentially related to the coup and some who had even sheltered Catholics in their home like de Bruegs. The order proved difficult to enforce. After most of the accused fled, only four were caught and killed, including one prominent coup leader, Rozel.

== Long-term consequences ==
On 15 November 1569 during the third French War of Religion, the Protestants of Nîmes would again execute a coup followed by a massacre, with this time perhaps 100-150 killed. The much larger massacre is, however, much more poorly recorded and less known, as it would not be followed by a reconquest and investigation since the Protestants would instead control Nîmes for the next 100 years, until the revocation of the Edict of Nantes. Thus they had little need or desire to publicise their own crimes.

The Michelade in Nimes has fed into the historiography concerning the nature of popular violence during the French Wars of Religion. In Natalie Zemon-Davis' thesis, popular Protestant violence was largely directed against profane objects and places, and popular Catholic violence was directed against pollutant heretics. Tulchin argues that the examples of La Rochelle and Nîmes suggest it was more of a numbers game and that in the rare towns in which Protestants held overwhelming numbers, they were just as likely to do mass killings as Catholics. The murders in La Rochelle and Nîmes were conducted by officials and largely targeted priests and high political officials, in contrast to massacres such as that at Sens or on St. Bartholomew's Day, which were more indiscriminate and spontaneous.
