= Eyraud-Crempse-Maurens =

- Commune
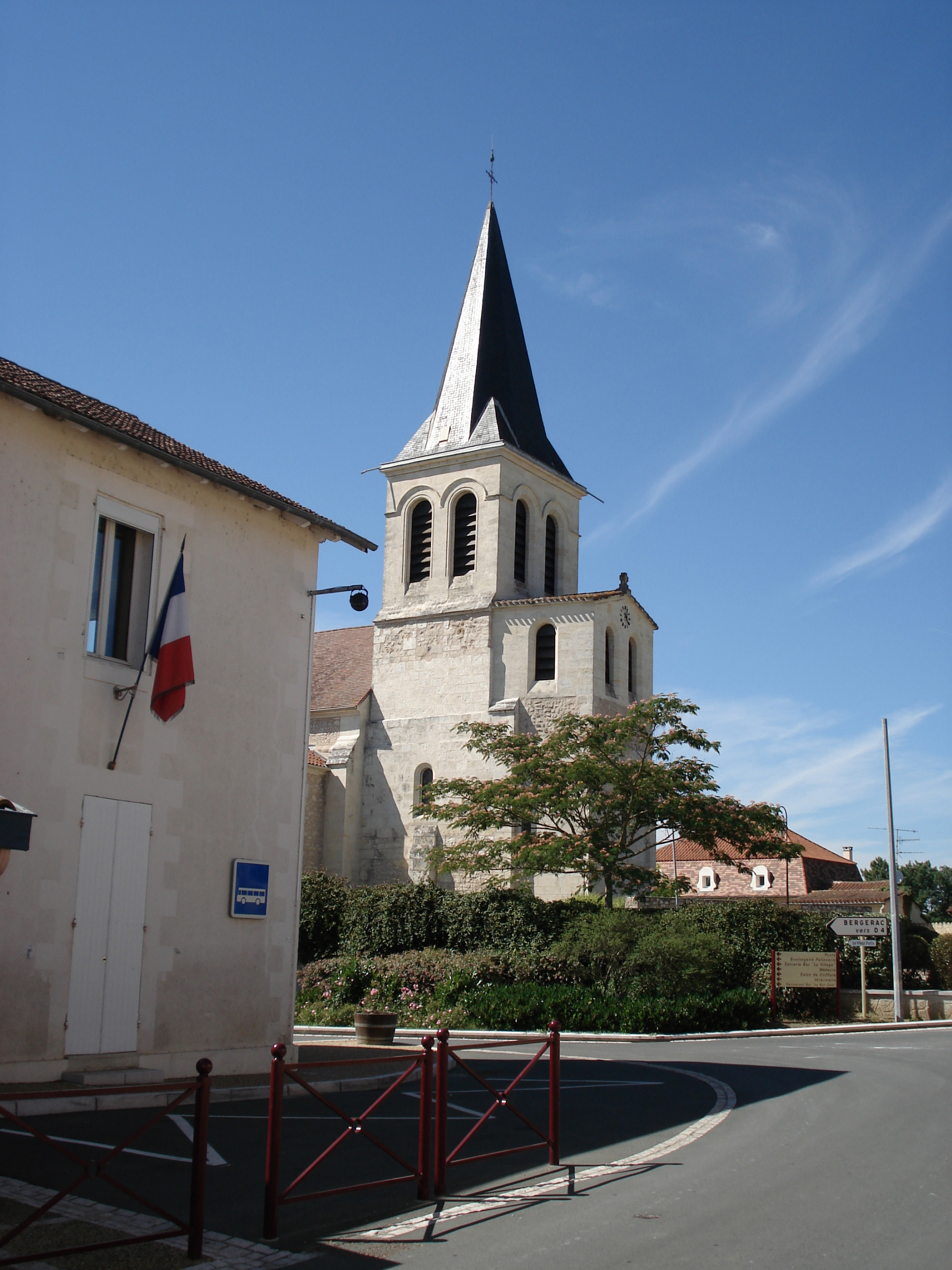
- The church of Maurens
- Location of Eyraud-Crempse-Maurens
- Location within France Location within Nouvelle-Aquitaine
- Coordinates: 44°56′10″N 0°29′04″E
- Country: France
- Region: Nouvelle-Aquitaine
- Department: Dordogne
- Arrondissement: Périgueux
- Canton: Périgord Central
- Intercommunality: Isle et Crempse en Périgord

Government
  - Mayor (2020–2026): Alain Ollivier
- Area^{1}: 50.51 km^{2} (19.50 sq mi)
- Highest elevation: 188 m (617 ft)
- Lowest elevation: 48 m (157 ft)
- Population (2023): 1,703
  - Density: 33.72/km^{2} (87.32/sq mi)
- Time zone: UTC+01:00 (CET)
  - Summer (DST): UTC+02:00 (CEST)
- INSEE/Postal code: 24259 /24140
- ^{1} French Land Register data, which excludes lakes, ponds, glaciers > 1 km^{2} (0.386 sq mi or 247 acres) and river estuaries.

Eyraud-Crempse-Maurens (French pronunciation: [ɛʁo kʁɛ̃ps moʁɛ̃s]) is a commune in the Dordogne department in Nouvelle-Aquitaine in southwestern France. It was established on 1 January 2019 by merger of the former communes of Maurens (the seat), Laveyssière, Saint-Jean-d'Eyraud and Saint-Julien-de-Crempse.

== See also ==
- Communes of the Dordogne department
