= Saint-Jean-d'Eyraud =

- Part of Eyraud-Crempse-Maurens
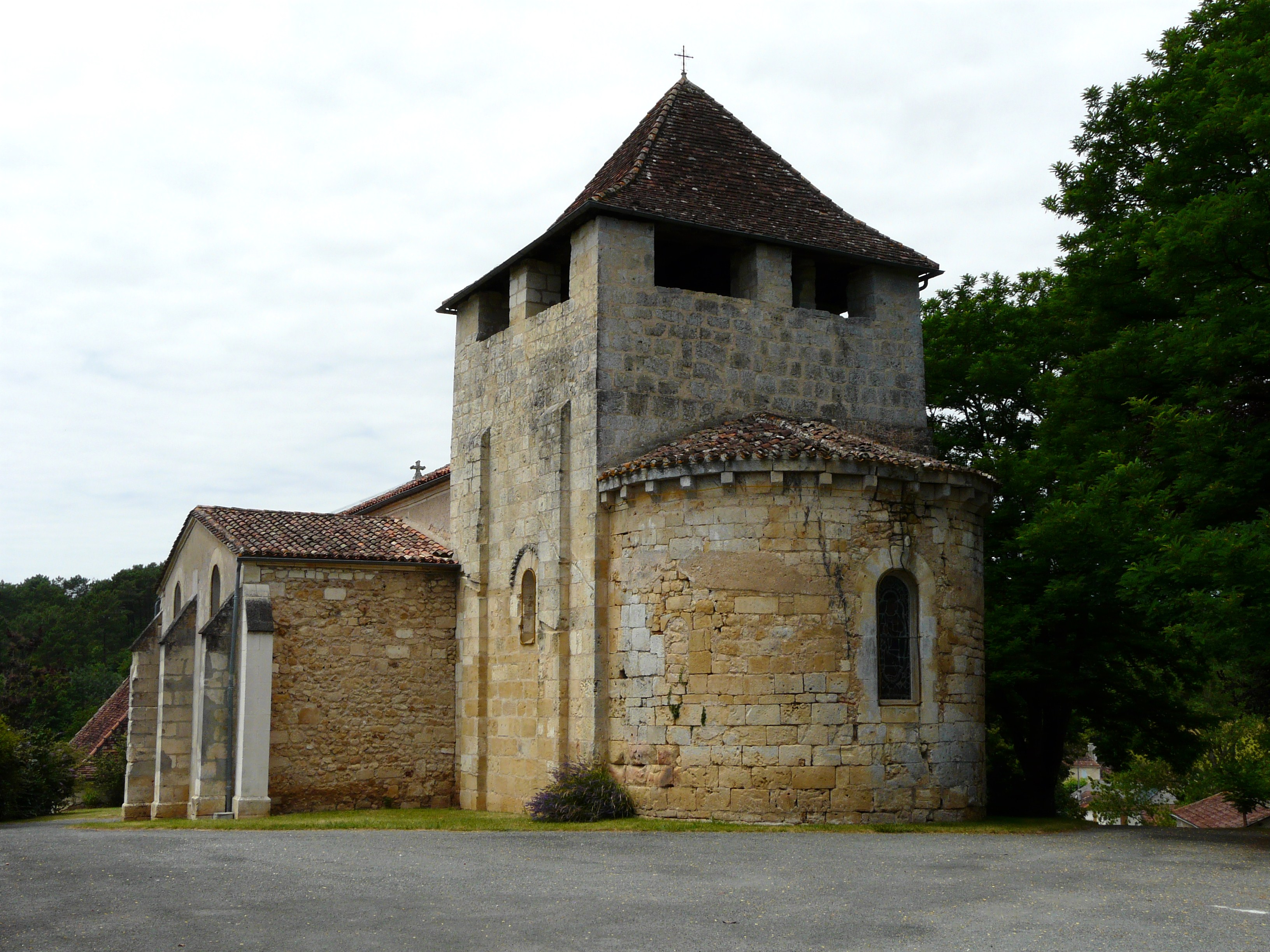
- Location of Saint-Jean-d'Eyraud
- Location within France Location within Nouvelle-Aquitaine
- Coordinates: 44°57′20″N 0°27′15″E
- Country: France
- Region: Nouvelle-Aquitaine
- Department: Dordogne
- Arrondissement: Périgueux
- Canton: Périgord Central
- Commune: Eyraud-Crempse-Maurens
- Area^{1}: 10.05 km^{2} (3.88 sq mi)
- Elevation: 110 m (360 ft)
- Highest elevation: 168 m (551 ft)
- Lowest elevation: 74 m (243 ft)
- Population (2023): 220
  - Density: 22/km^{2} (57/sq mi)
- Time zone: UTC+01:00 (CET)
  - Summer (DST): UTC+02:00 (CEST)
- Postal code: 24140
- ^{1} French Land Register data, which excludes lakes, ponds, glaciers > 1 km^{2} (0.386 sq mi or 247 acres) and river estuaries.

Saint-Jean-d'Eyraud (French pronunciation: [sɛ̃ ʒɑ̃ dɛʁo]; Occitan: Sent Joan d'Eiraud) is a former commune in the Dordogne department in Nouvelle-Aquitaine in southwestern France. On 1 January 2019, it was merged into the new commune Eyraud-Crempse-Maurens.

== See also ==
- Communes of the Dordogne department
