= Laveyssière =

- Part of Eyraud-Crempse-Maurens
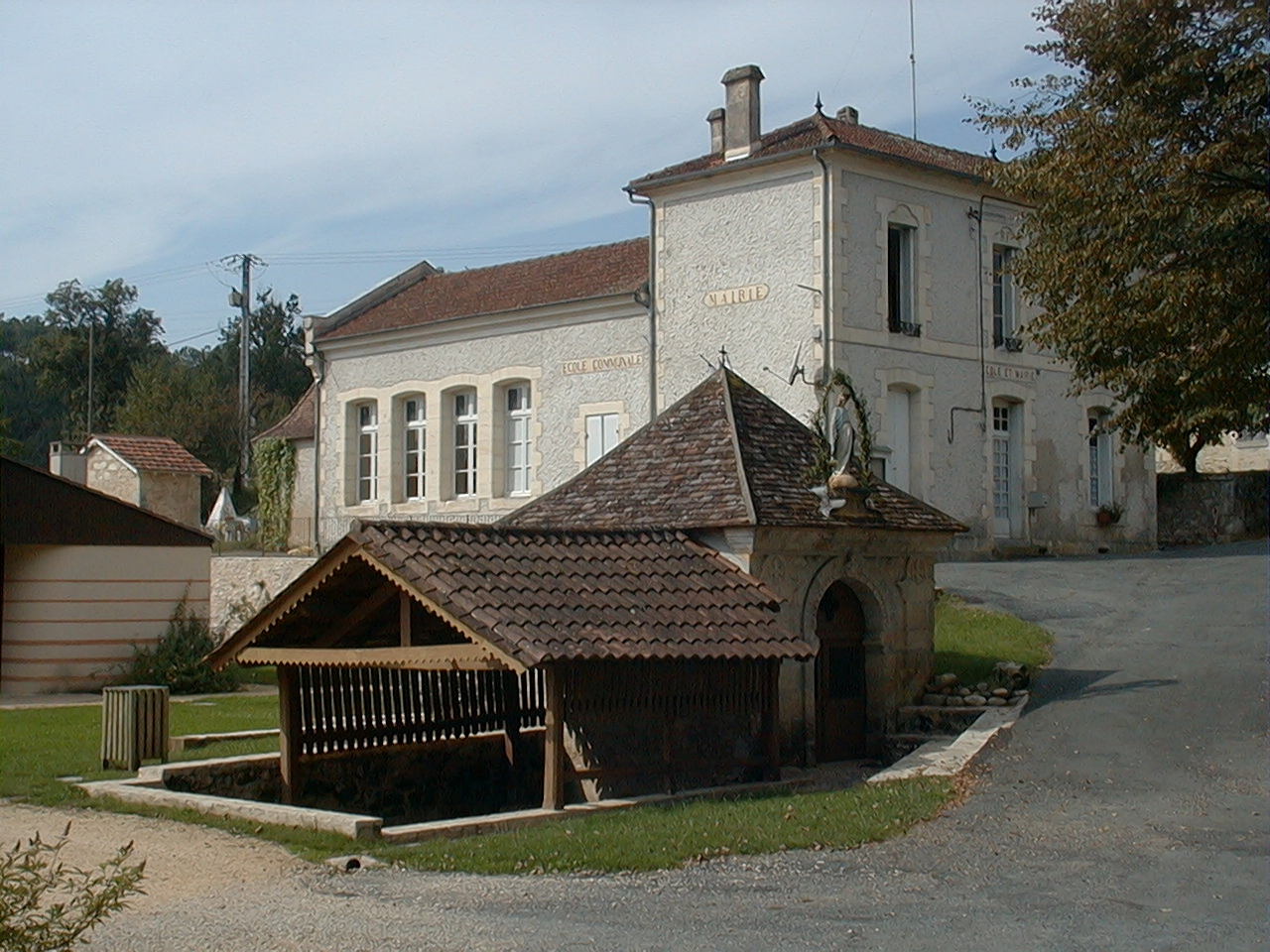
- Town hall
- Location of Laveyssière
- Location within France Location within Nouvelle-Aquitaine
- Coordinates: 44°56′33″N 0°26′35″E
- Country: France
- Region: Nouvelle-Aquitaine
- Department: Dordogne
- Arrondissement: Périgueux
- Canton: Périgord Central
- Commune: Eyraud-Crempse-Maurens
- Area^{1}: 6.70 km^{2} (2.59 sq mi)
- Elevation: 69 m (226 ft)
- Highest elevation: 146 m (479 ft)
- Lowest elevation: 58 m (190 ft)
- Population (2023): 132
  - Density: 19.7/km^{2} (51.0/sq mi)
- Time zone: UTC+01:00 (CET)
  - Summer (DST): UTC+02:00 (CEST)
- Postal code: 24130
- ^{1} French Land Register data, which excludes lakes, ponds, glaciers > 1 km^{2} (0.386 sq mi or 247 acres) and river estuaries.

Laveyssière (French pronunciation: [lavesjɛʁ]; Occitan: La Vaissièra) is a former commune in the Dordogne department in Nouvelle-Aquitaine in southwestern France. On 1 January 2019, it was merged into the new commune Eyraud-Crempse-Maurens.

== See also ==
- Communes of the Dordogne department
