= Avranches massacre =

1793 executions in Avranches, France

Coordinates: 48.6850°N 1.3556°W

The Avranches massacre took place on 21 November 1793 in the context of the savage "Vendée" civil war that broke out in the west of France between 1793 and 1796, during the French Revolution. It involved the killing by firing squad at Avranches of approximately 800 counter-revolutionary prisoners by Republican troops.

Although Avranches itself is some distance to the north of the Vendée region, the victims of the massacre had arrived in the area as part of the large but poorly coordinated counter-revolutionary force that had originated in the Vendée, and like many aspect of the War in the Vendée the Massacre of Avranches generated passionate and contrasting interpretations from commentators, throughout and beyond the nineteenth century.

== Background ==
During their sweep north, the army of the Vendée counter-revolutionaries, their numbers swollen by volunteers in Brittany and Maine, moved on into Normandy in order to attack the port of Granville. On 13 November, approaching from Dol and Pontorson, they marched on Avranches. The local authorities gave the order to destroy the bridge connecting the little hamlet of Ville Chérel with Pontorson which could have impeded the progress of the counter-revolutionaries, but this order was not implemented. The republicans then assembled an ad hoc peasant army of 5,000 or 6,000 from the surrounding area to defend Avranches, but without any weapons this force simply melted away when they saw the knights on horse-back at the head of the "cavalier" force approaching along the road from the west. The army from the Vendée was able to capture Avranches without resistance, and took the opportunity to replenish their supplies.

Most of the Republican city administrators simply fled. Some, however, along with some soldiers, were captured and imprisoned. At the same time, some of the suspected anti-Republicans who had been languishing in the town jail before the arrival of the Vendée army were now liberated by the Vendée general, Gaspard Marigny. Those released included the former mayor from the days before the revolution, Louis-Jules Boessel-Dubuisson. Boessel-Dubuisson now interceded on behalf of his Republican "patriot" fellow townsfolk, and procured their release. Various other republican prisoners were released in return for a promise that they would not take up arms again against the Royalists. These had their heads shaved so that if they failed to keep their promise they would be easy to identify. Meanwhile, a few acts of pillage by insurgents were identified and two men were shot.

The next day, 14 November, reinforced by a small number of sympathisers, the royalist army resumed their march towards Granville where, it was rumoured, they might be able to join up with a force from England. They left behind in Avranches their wounded and sick, to be cared for in the church, as well as some women and children who had been accompanying their army, all under the protection of a "rear guard" under the command of two of their generals, the aging Charles de Royrand and Jacques-Nicolas de Fleuriot de La Freulière.

Granville was not far from Avranches, and the Vendée army arrived during the afternoon and successfully overran some suburbs before setting about the walls of the main town. However, they had no siege equipment and there was no sign of any supporting English army arriving. At some stage there were cries of "treason" from within their ranks which led to panic and a disorderly withdrawal. The siege of Granville became a decisive defeat for the royalist counter-revolutionaries, and without any obvious plan for this eventuality they returned inland in some disarray, heading initially for Avranches and then moving back towards Pontorson on 18 November, by now pursued by a republican force of 6,000 men from the Caen-based Army of the Coasts of Cherbourg, under the command of General Sepher and the government representative Jacques Léonard Laplanche.

== Massacre ==
On 21 November 1793, while the counter revolutionary Catholic and Royal Army and the republican forces confronted one another nearby in what would come to be known as the Battle of Dol, troops sent by General Sepher entered Avranches. The town's republican administration was quickly restored, but they were desperate to avoid the Représentant en mission (government agent accompanying the republican forces) ordering that the town should be burned down. Their concern was based on a National Convention civil war decree that any town taken by the Vendée without a fight should be consigned to flames. The "Représentant" Jean-Baptiste Le Carpentier fueled the town council's concerns, accusing the townsfolk of cowardice or treason: "In a few more days, dear comrade citizens, I hope to be able to announce the annihilation of the new Vendée by the Channel and to incinerate, if necessary, the infamous Avranchinais(es)" ("Encore quelques jours, citoyens collègues, et j'espère vous annoncer l'anéantissement de la nouvelle Vendée de la Manche et brûler, s'il est nécessaire, l'infâme Avranches1").

Learning that the Vendéens had left between 55 and 60 of their people, injured or ill, in the town hospital, one of the first concerns of the council was to order that these be shot. The victims were led from the hospital to a field nearby where they were killed by a firing squad. The council sent a suitably worded report of the affair to the powerful Committee of Public Safety in Paris.

The same day, Représentant Laplanche was informed that there were still a number of counter revolutionary rebels hiding in and around the town. He ordered that the town and surrounding villages be combed by troops: this led to the discovery and capture of about 800 identified as rebel royalists. Most of these were injured or sick. They were now taken to the Plateau de Changeons on the edge of town where they were grouped together and en circled by three musketeer battalions which fired into the group until there were none left alive.

Retribution continued for several days, with people suspected of having joined the Vendéens imprisoned or killed. A number of bodies were later recovered of people who had drowned in the Sélune River while trying to escape. Others were simply shot by the "Carpentier Commission".
