= Luxiol massacre =

1989 mass shooting in Doubs Department, France

- Native name: Tuerie de Luxiol
- Location: Canton of Baume-les-Dames, Doubs, France
- Date: 12 July 1989; 37 years ago 14:30 – 15:00 (CEST)
- Attack type: Mass shooting
- Weapon: 12-gauge double-barreled shotgun
- Deaths: 14
- Injuries: 9 (including the perpetrator)
- Perpetrator: Christian Dornier
- Charges: Murder x14 Attempted murder x8
- Verdict: Not criminally responsible

On 12 July, 1989, a mass shooting took place in and around Luxiol, Doubs, France. 30-year-old Christian Dornier shot three family members with a shotgun, killing two of them, as well as a farm worker before driving to the nearby village where he fatally shot eleven more people.

Dornier was diagnosed with schizophrenia and thus could not be held accountable for his crime according to French law, much to the anger of the victims' families. He has been treated in a psychiatric hospital in Sarreguemines since April 1991.

== Shooting ==
A few hours before the shooting, Dornier refused to have lunch with his family. He moved the car of his brother-in-law, Daniel Maillard, out of the way of his own vehicle, and then waited in the kitchen, where he had hidden a double-barrelled shotgun behind a cupboard. The shotgun was earlier found by Maillard when it was overthrown by his dog, though he thought that Dornier's father had put it there after the previous shooting incidents.

At 14:30, the car of cattle inseminator Marcel Lechine pulled up outside the house. When Lechine entered, Dornier shot him, apparently believing him to be his brother Serge. He then opened fire at his family, killing his sister Corinne by shooting her at point-blank range, and wounding his 63-year-old father with a shot to the neck. Dornier pursued his father to a neighbour's house and shot him again in his side. He then returned home and fatally wounded his mother while she was calling police. She later died in hospital. Maillard escaped the shooting unharmed because he was in the bathroom at that time and fled through a window.

Dornier packed more ammunition and left the farm in his car, driving around the area and shooting people at random. He first encountered 10-year-old Yoan Robez-Masson and his adopted brother Johnny and killed them both as they were riding their bikes. From a distance of 300 metres he then killed Stanislas and Marie Périard; Louis Cuenot; and Louis Liard; and wounded six others, among them Juliette Périard; Jeanine Cuenot; a 14-year-old girl named Angeline; and René Barrand, who was shot in the head and legs. Dornier also shot at the latter's wife, Marie-Therese, who was standing in her kitchen. After he had killed the niece of Mayor Roger Clausse, five-year-old Pauline Faivre-Pierret, and was about to reload his gun to shoot her aunt when Joel Clausse, the mayor's son, grabbed a gun and fired a shot at him. Dornier, hit in the neck, then fled to continue his rampage elsewhere.

While Roger Clausse alerted police, Dornier drove towards Baume-les-Dames, killing Louis Girardot on the way and shooting gendarme René Sarrazin in the arm. While being chased by 40 police officers, he shot Georges Pernin and Marie-Alice Champroy at a crossroads – causing their cars to crash – and killed Pierre Boeuf. Police confronted Dornier in Verne and engaged him in a shootout. Dornier was arrested after being shot in the stomach.

=== Victims ===
- Pierre Boeuf
- Marie-Alice Champroy
- Louis Cuenot, 67
- Jeanne Dornier, 57, Christian Dornier's mother
- Corinne Dornier, 26, Christian Dornier's sister
- Pauline Faivre-Pierret, 5
- Louis Girardot, 47
- Marcel Lechine, 45
- Louis Liard, 50
- Marie Périard, 81
- Stanislas Périard, 79, brother of Marie Périard
- Georges Pernin, 40, teacher from Autechaux
- Yoan Robez-Masson, 10
- Johnny Robez-Masson, 14, brother of Yoan Robez-Masson

== Perpetrator ==

Christian Dornier was born on July 15, 1958 in Baume-les-Dames, the oldest child of three children to Georges and Jeanne Dornier. Dornier served twelve months in the French Armed Forces as part of mandatory duty around 1981, which apparently negatively affected him. Dornier was described as a reserved person who liked to read and work in the forest. According to his brother he had no friends and hardly talked to anyone, sometimes not talking to anyone in Luxiol for weeks.

One and a half years prior to the shooting, Dornier's father decided to retire and hand over the farm to him in three years. Dornier enrolled in a month-long agricultural course to prepare for taking over the farm, but he returned after a week, apparently broken. He shaved his head, began to smoke, abandoned his farm work, and became violent. Eventually Dornier's father decided not to cede the farm to him. Three months prior to the shooting, Dornier, together with his father, bought a Volkswagen Golf GTI because he wanted the choice to leave the farm whenever he wished.

In the months prior to the rampage, Dornier fired shots at his father and his neighbour René Barrand, and pelted a woman with stones. The incidents were discussed at the village council, but it was decided that no action was needed since Dornier never had any trouble with the law. However, Dornier's family was advised to get him psychiatric help, while his father began to hide his guns. Dornier was regularly visited by a psychiatrist from Baume-les-Dames, who prescribed him tranquilizers, but according to his brother he never took them. Dornier's parents considered putting him in a psychiatric hospital, but he became furious when his doctor talked to him about the matter and his mother eventually decided against it.

In July 1989, Dornier apparently had a nervous breakdown and didn't attend the wedding of his sister on July 8. Instead, he drove through the area the entire day.

== Aftermath ==
Prime Minister Michel Rocard sent his condolences. All festivities planned for celebrating the Bastille Day on July 14 were cancelled in Baume-les-Dames and replaced with a solemn ceremony to commemorate the victims of the shooting.

The reason for the shooting is not known, though it was speculated that Dornier was angry because his father had decided not to turn over the farm's management to him. Police recovered two suitcases at Dornier's farm, packed, among other things, with books and clothes, suggesting that he had planned to flee afterwards. Dornier later told staff in psychiatric holding that he believed his family had conspired to kill him, which was attributed to baseless paranoia due to his then-undiagnosed schizophrenia.

Dornier was kept under heavy guard in a hospital in Besançon. On July 15 he was transferred to the prison hospital in Fresnes and charged with fourteen counts of murder and eight counts of attempted murder. Two psychiatrists were appointed to examine his mental state, and in November the same year they declared that Dornier had schizophrenia, was therefore not responsible for his crimes, and should be confined in a special facility for dangerous patients. Their findings were confirmed in February 1990 and so he was declared insane and transferred from the prison in Dijon, where he was held in remand, to a mental hospital in Sarreguemines on April 18, 1991.

An application by the victims' families to bring Dornier before a criminal court was dismissed on March 2, 1994. On March 16 the same year, about fifty residents of Luxiol protested against the decision in front of the court in Besançon.

Since entry, Dornier was held in a UMD under constant surveillance and strict schedule, as an orderly environment was deemed essential to his treatment. According to psychiatrists, he has been made aware of the impact the killings and a review board convenes every six months to judge Dornier's progress. However, as of April 2025, doctors agreed that while Dornier had gained a greater understanding of his actions, he still lacked full awareness and remained convinced that his family had been plotting to kill him. As such, Dornier declined requests for visits by his father, who sought to re-establish contact with him, until the elder Dornier's death.

== See also ==
- Cuers massacre
- Dol massacre
- Nanterre massacre
