= Maurens, Dordogne =

Maurens
- Part of Eyraud-Crempse-Maurens
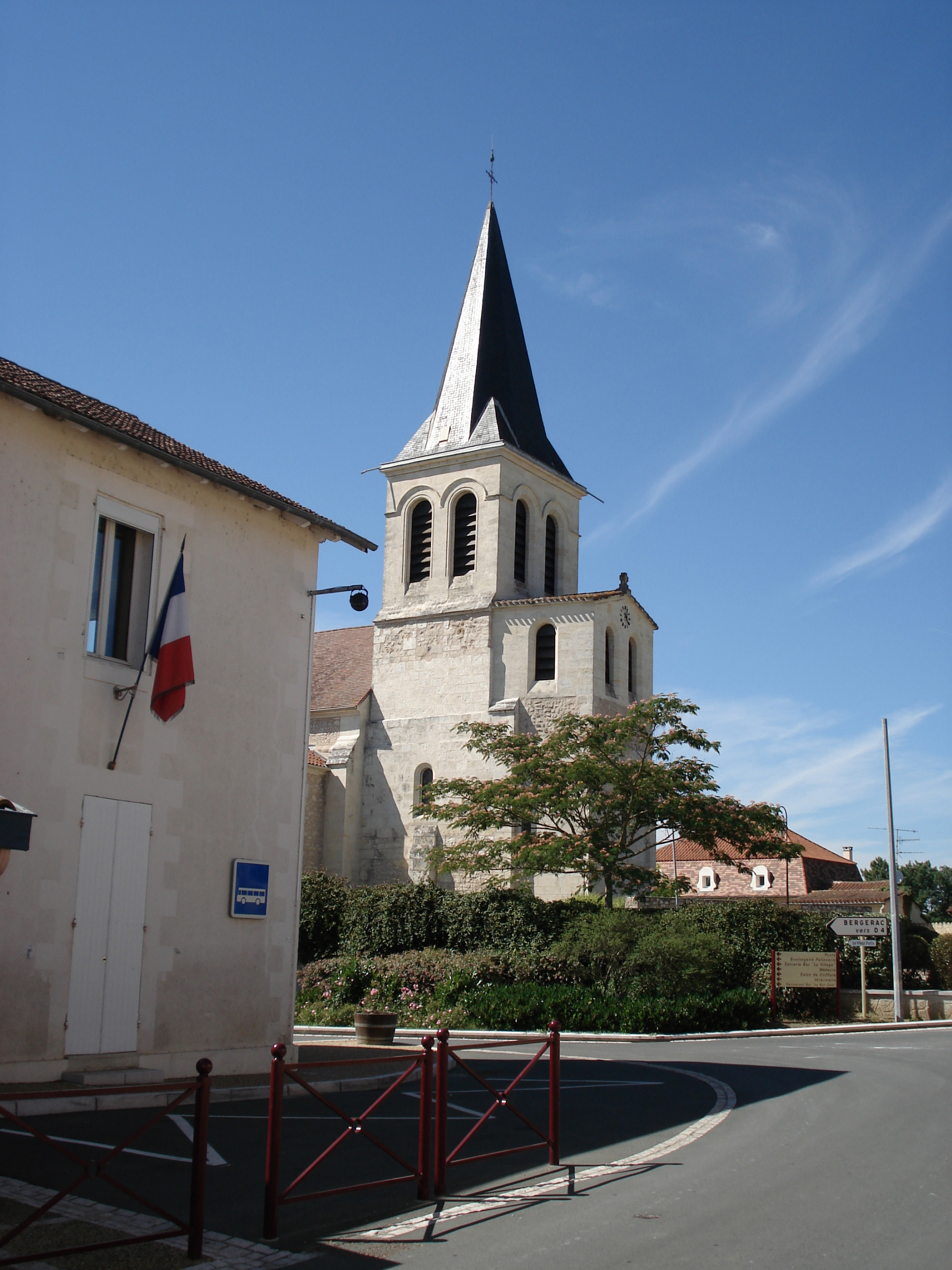
- The church of Maurens
- Location of Maurens
- Location within France Location within Nouvelle-Aquitaine
- Coordinates: 44°56′10″N 0°29′04″E
- Country: France
- Region: Nouvelle-Aquitaine
- Department: Dordogne
- Arrondissement: Périgueux
- Canton: Périgord Central
- Commune: Eyraud-Crempse-Maurens
- Area^{1}: 22.58 km^{2} (8.72 sq mi)
- Elevation: 103 m (338 ft)
- Highest elevation: 185 m (607 ft)
- Lowest elevation: 48 m (157 ft)
- Population (2022): 1,119
  - Density: 49.56/km^{2} (128.4/sq mi)
- Time zone: UTC+01:00 (CET)
  - Summer (DST): UTC+02:00 (CEST)
- Postal code: 24140
- ^{1} French Land Register data, which excludes lakes, ponds, glaciers > 1 km^{2} (0.386 sq mi or 247 acres) and river estuaries.

Maurens (French pronunciation: [moʁɛ̃s]) is a former commune in the Dordogne department in Aquitaine in southwestern France. On 1 January 2019, it was merged into the new commune Eyraud-Crempse-Maurens.

== Population ==
Historical population
| Year | Pop. | ±% p.a. |
|---|---|---|
| 1962 | 651 | — |
| 1968 | 593 | −1.54% |
| 1975 | 595 | +0.05% |
| 1982 | 777 | +3.89% |
| 1990 | 871 | +1.44% |
| 1999 | 896 | +0.31% |
| 2022 | 1,119 | +0.97% |
Source: EHESS and INSEE

== See also ==
- Communes of the Dordogne department
