= Saint-Julien-de-Crempse =

- Part of Eyraud-Crempse-Maurens
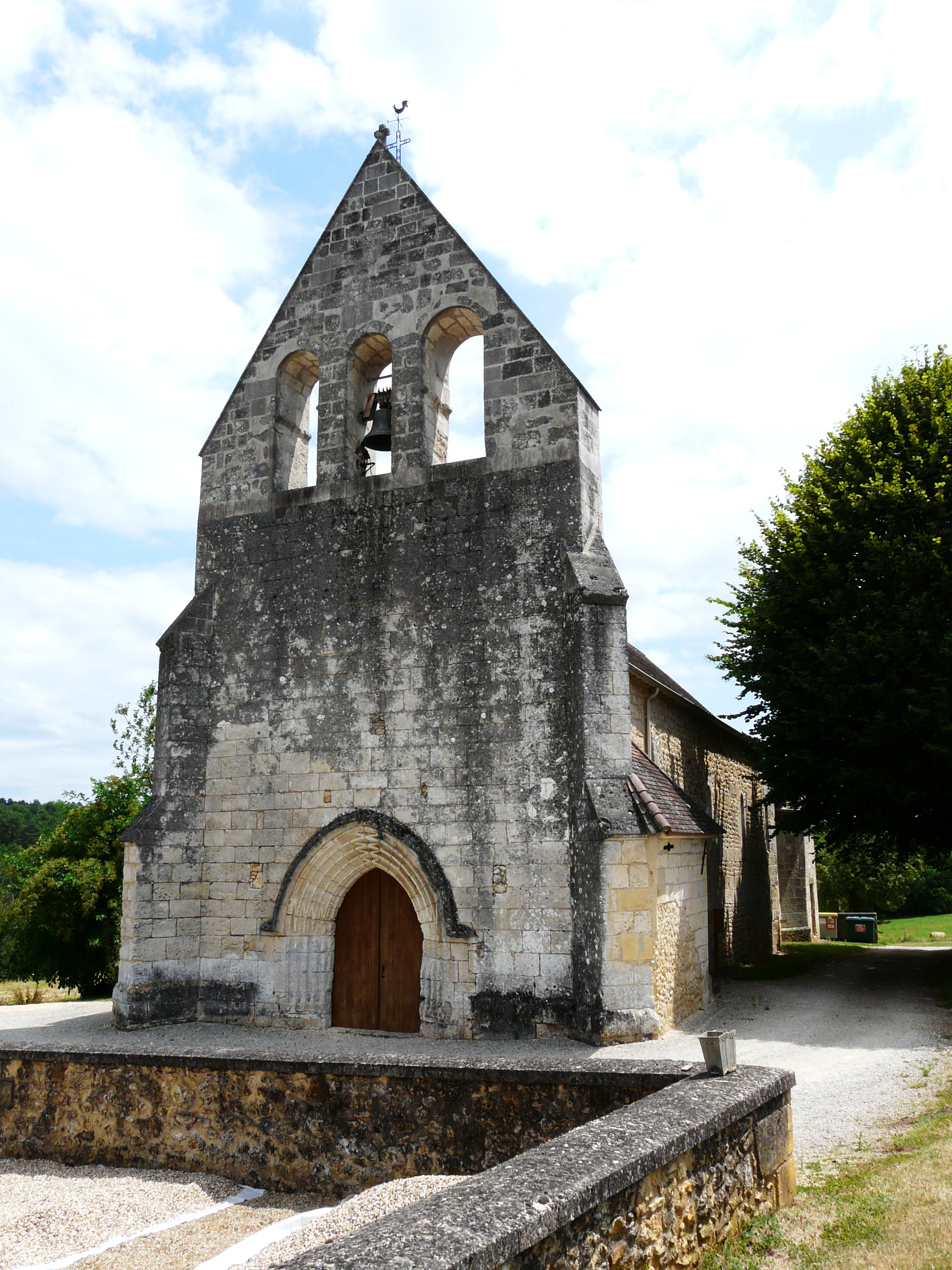

- Coat of arms
- Location of Saint-Julien-de-Crempse
- Location within France Location within Nouvelle-Aquitaine
- Coordinates: 44°57′10″N 0°31′31″E
- Country: France
- Region: Nouvelle-Aquitaine
- Department: Dordogne
- Arrondissement: Périgueux
- Canton: Périgord Central
- Commune: Eyraud-Crempse-Maurens
- Area^{1}: 11.18 km^{2} (4.32 sq mi)
- Elevation: 150 m (490 ft)
- Highest elevation: 188 m (617 ft)
- Lowest elevation: 87 m (285 ft)
- Population (2023): 207
  - Density: 18.5/km^{2} (48.0/sq mi)
- Time zone: UTC+01:00 (CET)
  - Summer (DST): UTC+02:00 (CEST)
- Postal code: 24140
- ^{1} French Land Register data, which excludes lakes, ponds, glaciers > 1 km^{2} (0.386 sq mi or 247 acres) and river estuaries.

Saint-Julien-de-Crempse (French pronunciation: [sɛ̃ ʒyljɛ̃ də kʁɛ̃ps]; Occitan: Sent Júlia de Cremsa or Sent Júlian de Cremsa) is a former commune in the Dordogne department in Nouvelle-Aquitaine in southwestern France. On 1 January 2019, it was merged into the new commune Eyraud-Crempse-Maurens.

== History ==
During World War II the surrounding countryside may have been home to as many as 60 separate cells of the French Resistance. Saint-Julien was a hiding place for Resistance fighters, and one Maquis leader had his base in the village. On 9 August 1944, 17 villagers from Saint-Julien were executed by the Germans as reprisal for Resistance activities in the area. On 10 September 1944, 17 German prisoners of war were collected by French Resistance members and executed near Saint-Julien as a revenge killing.

== See also ==
- Communes of the Dordogne department
