= Luxiol =

Commune in Doubs, France

- Commune
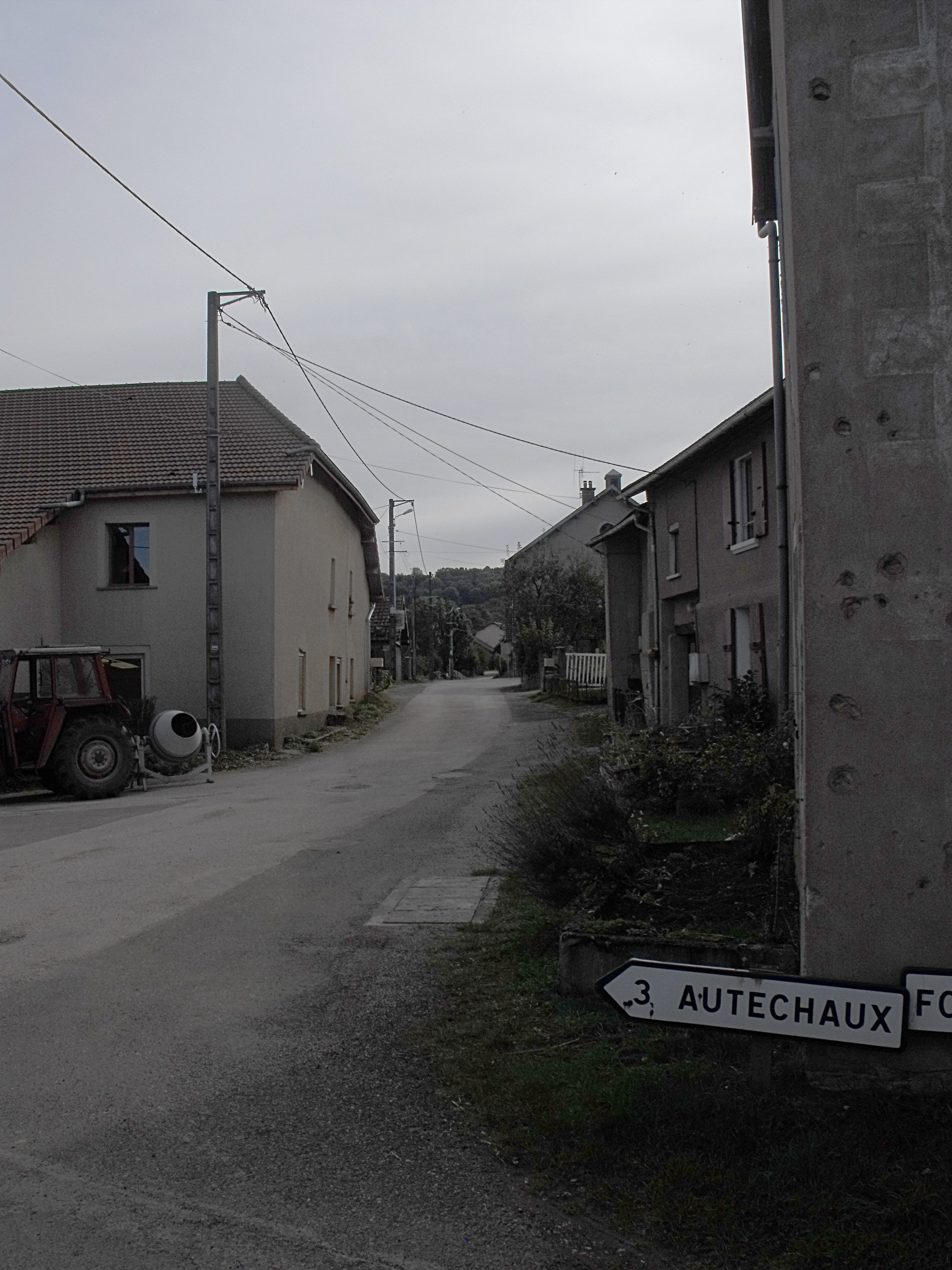
- Location of Luxiol
- Location within France Location within Bourgogne-Franche-Comté
- Coordinates: 47°22′54″N 6°21′00″E
- Country: France
- Region: Bourgogne-Franche-Comté
- Department: Doubs
- Arrondissement: Besançon
- Canton: Baume-les-Dames

Government
  - Mayor (2020–2026): Bertrand Barrand
- Area^{1}: 6.44 km^{2} (2.49 sq mi)
- Highest elevation: 525 m (1,722 ft)
- Lowest elevation: 360 m (1,180 ft)
- Population (2023): 157
  - Density: 24.4/km^{2} (63.1/sq mi)
- Time zone: UTC+01:00 (CET)
  - Summer (DST): UTC+02:00 (CEST)
- INSEE/Postal code: 25354 /25110
- ^{1} French Land Register data, which excludes lakes, ponds, glaciers > 1 km^{2} (0.386 sq mi or 247 acres) and river estuaries.

Luxiol (French pronunciation: [lyksjɔl]) is a commune in the Doubs department in the Bourgogne-Franche-Comté region in eastern France.

== History ==
Luxiol is not known for any particular heritage sites, with Roger Clausse, mayor of Luxiol between 1965 to 1995, describing Luxiol as "a village without history" in 1989. Luxiol was the place of the Roman Loposagium. Sequani were most likely settled in the area. A rare stater was found in Luxiol and has since exhibited at Musée des Beaux-Arts et d'Archéologie de Besançon. Another coin, presumed to be an antoninianus or aureus, remains in a private collection in Luxiol. During the Middle Ages, Luxiol was part of the seigneurie of Clerval. In 1773, Louis XV ceded Luxiol to Sieur de Mauclerc d'Osse.

Throughout the mid-19th century, Auguste Napoléon Parandier constructed most of the roadways connecting Luxiol and other communes in Doubs. Parandier established that Luxiol was once a common road station, as the second oldest local pathway and subsequent crossroads passed through Luxiol at the midway point.

In July 1989, a mass shooting took place in Luxiol, in which 15 residents were killed. It was described as the worst mass murder in modern France. A memorial to the victims was subsequently built at A36 autoroute.

For most of its history, Luxiol was an agricultural community. By 2026, only six residents were farmers.

== Nature ==
During Cyclone Lothar in 1999, all 150 hectares of Luxiol's forest were undamaged.

The subterranean river cave system Grotte d'En Versenne ranges around 8 kilometres in length. Topography of the cavern was created in the early 1990s by Jef Loeillot. En Versenne is occasionally used as a caving location.

== Population ==
Historical population
Year	Pop.	±% p.a.
1968	141	—
1975	138	−0.31%
1982	128	−1.07%
1990	138	+0.94%
1999	158	+1.52%
2007	166	+0.62%
2012	156	−1.23%
2017	161	+0.63%
2023	157	−0.42%
Source: INSEE

== See also ==
- Communes of the Doubs department
