= Saint-André-des-Eaux, Côtes-d'Armor =

Saint-André-des-Eaux Sant-Andrev-an-Dour
- Commune
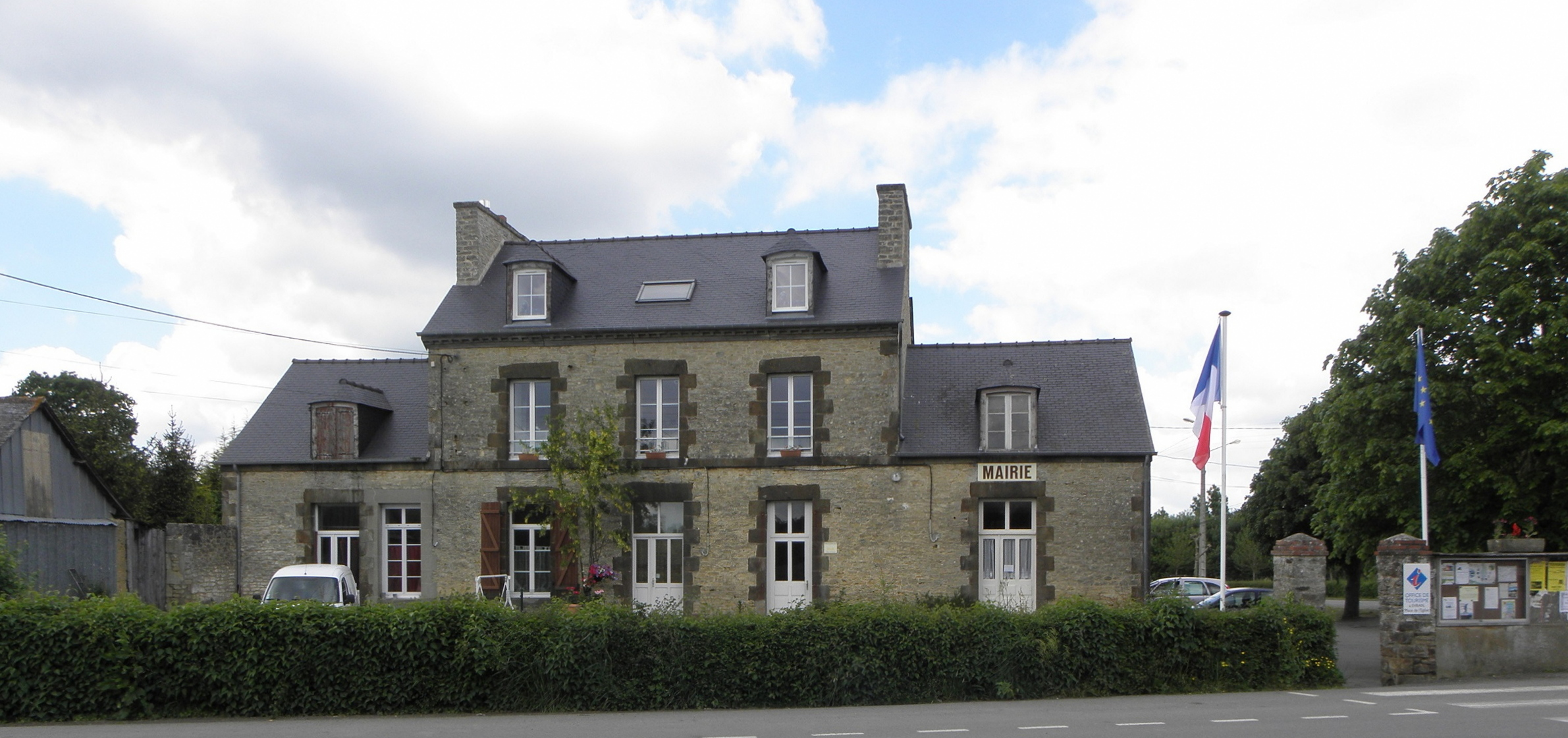
- The town hall of Saint-André-des-Eaux
- Location of Saint-André-des-Eaux
- Location within France Location within Brittany
- Coordinates: 48°22′21″N 2°00′31″W
- Country: France
- Region: Brittany
- Department: Côtes-d'Armor
- Arrondissement: Dinan
- Canton: Lanvallay
- Intercommunality: Dinan Agglomération

Government
  - Mayor (2020–2026): Jean-Louis Nogues
- Area^{1}: 5.24 km^{2} (2.02 sq mi)
- Highest elevation: 36 m (118 ft)
- Lowest elevation: 11 m (36 ft)
- Population (2023): 409
  - Density: 78.1/km^{2} (202/sq mi)
- Time zone: UTC+01:00 (CET)
  - Summer (DST): UTC+02:00 (CEST)
- INSEE/Postal code: 22274 /22630
- ^{1} French Land Register data, which excludes lakes, ponds, glaciers > 1 km^{2} (0.386 sq mi or 247 acres) and river estuaries.

Saint-André-des-Eaux (French pronunciation: [sɛ̃.t‿ɑ̃dʁe de.z‿o]; Breton: Sant-Andrev-an-Dour) is a commune in the Côtes-d'Armor department of Brittany in northwestern France.

== Population ==
Historical population
Year	Pop.	±% p.a.
1968	250	—
1975	230	−1.18%
1982	219	−0.70%
1990	204	−0.88%
1999	237	+1.68%
2007	257	+1.02%
2012	254	−0.23%
2017	339	+5.94%
2023	409	+3.18%
Source: INSEE

Inhabitants of Saint-André-des-Eaux are called andréanais in French.

== See also ==
- Communes of the Côtes-d'Armor department
