= Maillé, Indre-et-Loire =

Maillé
- Commune
- Coat of arms
- Location of Maillé
- Location within France Location within Centre-Val de Loire
- Coordinates: 47°03′13″N 0°34′56″E
- Country: France
- Region: Centre-Val de Loire
- Department: Indre-et-Loire
- Arrondissement: Chinon
- Canton: Sainte-Maure-de-Touraine

Government
  - Mayor (2022–2026): Jean-Jacques Roy
- Area^{1}: 15.67 km^{2} (6.05 sq mi)
- Highest elevation: 110 m (360 ft)
- Lowest elevation: 43 m (141 ft)
- Population (2023): 557
  - Density: 35.5/km^{2} (92.1/sq mi)
- Time zone: UTC+01:00 (CET)
  - Summer (DST): UTC+02:00 (CEST)
- INSEE/Postal code: 37142 /37800
- ^{1} French Land Register data, which excludes lakes, ponds, glaciers > 1 km^{2} (0.386 sq mi or 247 acres) and river estuaries.

Maillé (French pronunciation: [maje]) is a commune in the central French department of Indre-et-Loire.

== History ==
=== World War II massacre ===
On 25 August 1944, German soldiers killed 124 people and razed the village. The resultant massacre was the second-largest in France of World War II, after that at Oradour-sur-Glane.

On the same day that Paris was surrendered to the Allies, an estimated 80 Waffen-SS soldiers of the 17th SS Panzergrenadier Division entered the village of 600 people in the morning, and killed 124 residents, including 46 children under the age of 14, and 42 women. Many of the victims were shot; the remainder bludgeoned, bayoneted, or burned. The village was then shelled until it was in ruins. Survivors later found a handwritten message on several corpses: "This is punishment for terrorists and their assistants."

The reasons for the massacre are still unknown, although on the previous day a group of French resistance fighters had killed several German officers travelling in a car, and in a separate incident ambushed a Waffen-SS column to the north; the district was also at the time safeguarding a United States Army Air Forces pilot who had crash-landed in the area.

Only one person has ever been held accountable, when in 1952 former German army lieutenant Gustav Schlueter was tried in absentia by a French court and found guilty. He remained living in Germany until his death in 1965.

Although France has a 30-year limit on war crimes prosecutions, Germany does not. After the massacre featured in a German newspaper article in 2004, Dortmund-based prosecutor Ulrich Maas, who specialises in hunting down war criminals, started an investigation. After a television documentary on the massacre, Maas visited the village in July 2008 to collect more information, and laid a wreath at the memorial.

== Population ==
Historical population
| Year | Pop. | ±% p.a. |
|---|---|---|
| 1968 | 587 | — |
| 1975 | 518 | −1.77% |
| 1982 | 580 | +1.63% |
| 1990 | 594 | +0.30% |
| 1999 | 653 | +1.06% |
| 2007 | 614 | −0.77% |
| 2012 | 594 | −0.66% |
| 2017 | 578 | −0.54% |
| 2023 | 557 | −0.61% |
Source: INSEE

== See also ==
- Communes of the Indre-et-Loire department
- Oradour-sur-Glane
- French Resistance
- The Maquis
- Waffen-SS
