= Wassy =

- Commune
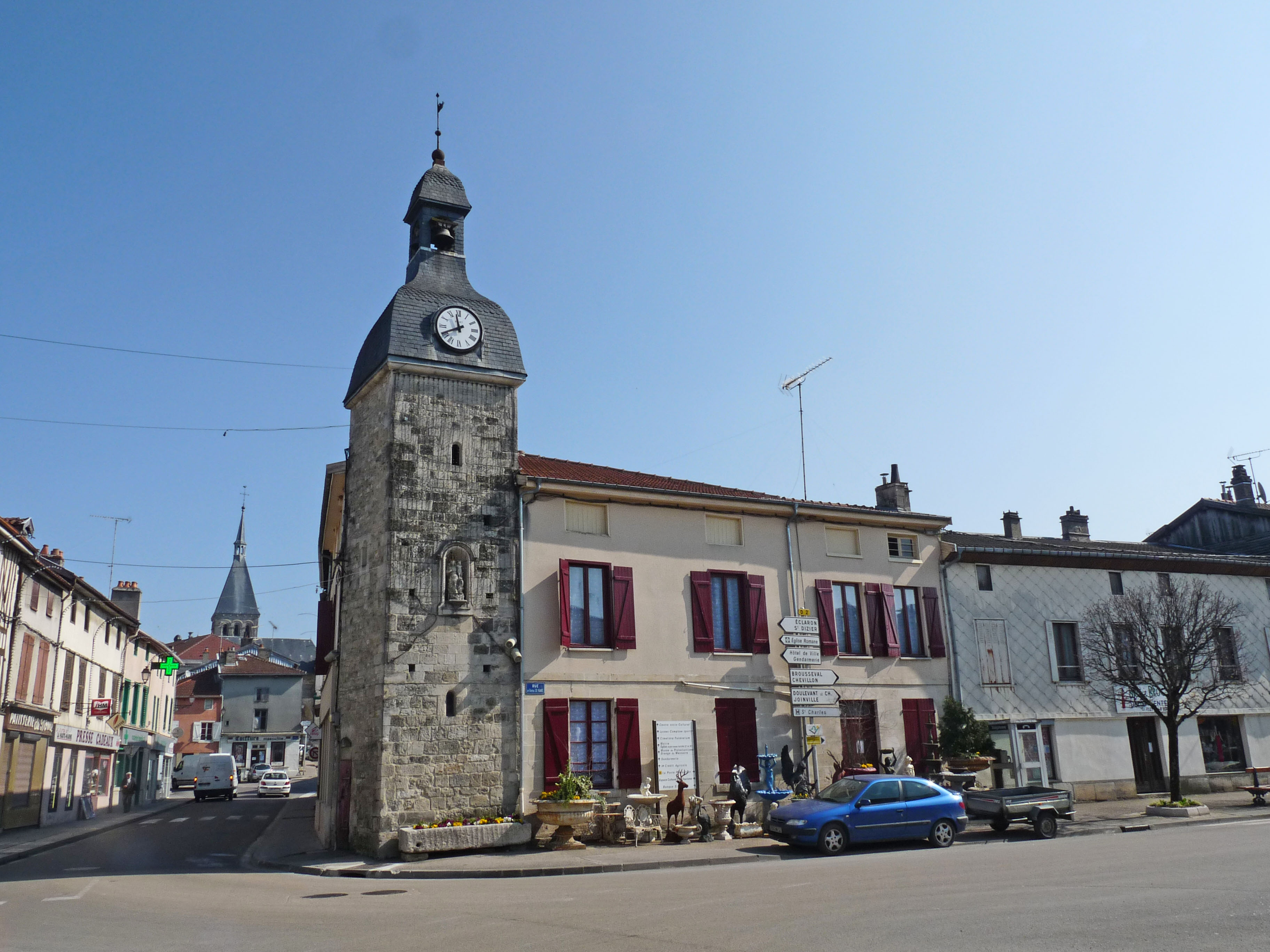
- Tour du Dôme in Wassy

- Coat of arms
- Location of Wassy
- Location within France Location within Grand Est
- Coordinates: 48°29′58″N 04°56′55″E
- Country: France
- Region: Grand Est
- Department: Haute-Marne
- Arrondissement: Saint-Dizier
- Canton: Wassy
- Intercommunality: CA Grand Saint-Dizier, Der et Vallées

Government
  - Mayor (2020–2026): Jean-Alain Charpentier
- Area^{1}: 33.82 km^{2} (13.06 sq mi)
- Elevation: 172 m (564 ft)
- Highest elevation: 224 m (735 ft)
- Lowest elevation: 154 m (505 ft)
- Population (2023): 2,771
  - Density: 81.93/km^{2} (212.2/sq mi)
- Time zone: UTC+01:00 (CET)
  - Summer (DST): UTC+02:00 (CEST)
- INSEE/Postal code: 52550 /52130
- ^{1} French Land Register data, which excludes lakes, ponds, glaciers > 1 km^{2} (0.386 sq mi or 247 acres) and river estuaries.

Wassy (French pronunciation: [vasi]) is a commune in the Haute-Marne department in north-eastern France. Wassy has been twinned with the German town of Eppingen in north-west Baden-Württemberg since 1967.

== History ==
On 1 March 1562, a faction of armed soldiers under Francis, Duke of Guise attacked and killed worshippers at a Huguenot service, called the Massacre of Wassy, which marked the start of the First War of Religion in France.

== Geography ==
The river Blaise flows through the commune.

== Population ==
Historical population
Year	Pop.	±% p.a.
1968	3,286	—
1975	3,228	−0.25%
1982	3,316	+0.38%
1990	3,291	−0.09%
1999	3,294	+0.01%
2007	3,074	−0.86%
2012	2,909	−1.10%
2017	2,905	−0.03%
2023	2,771	−0.78%
Source: INSEE

== See also ==
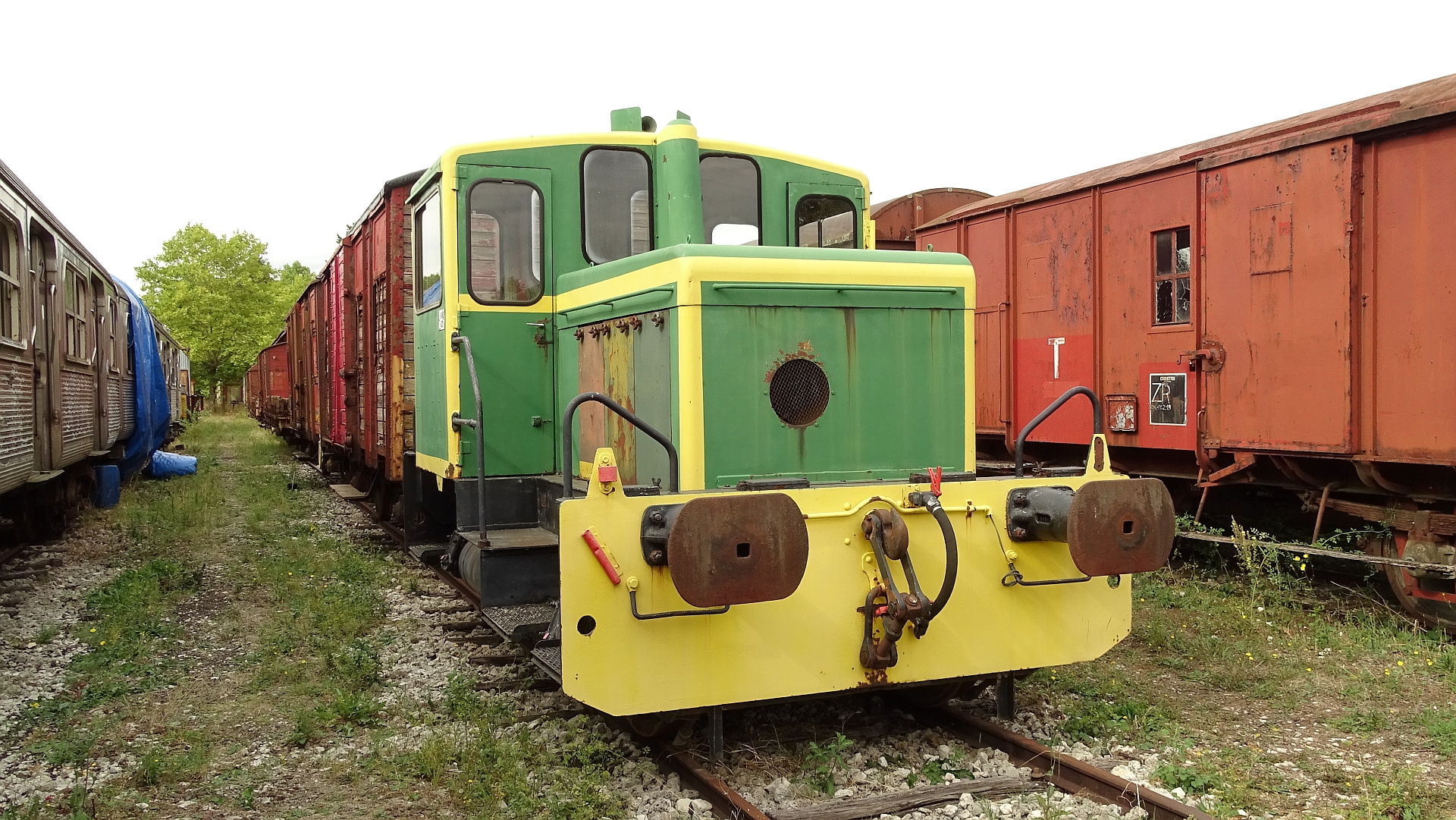
SNCF Class Y 2200 at Amis de la Gare de Wassy

- Communes of the Haute-Marne department
