= Rochechouart =

Rochechouart Rechoard (Occitan)
- Subprefecture and commune
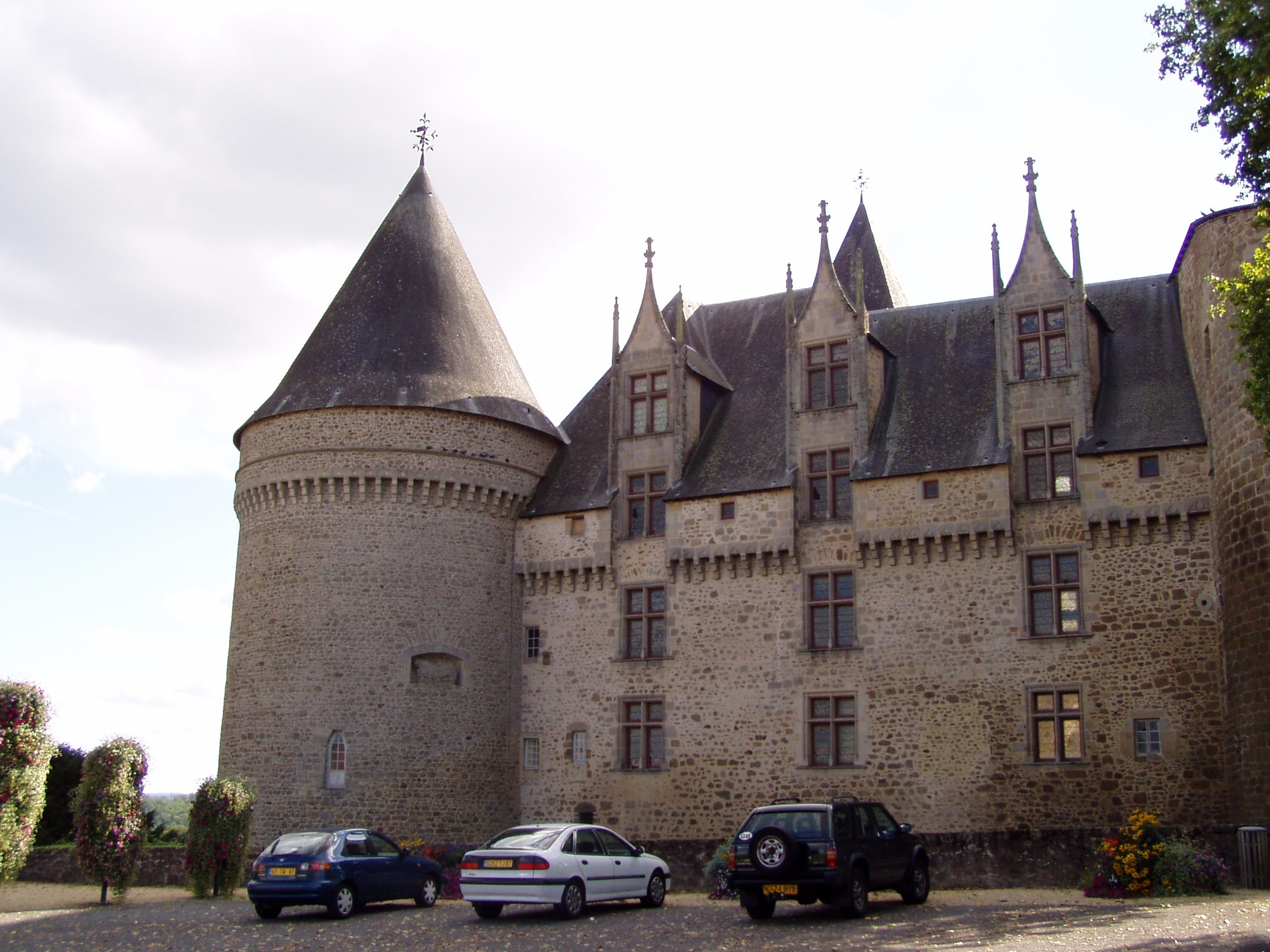
- Rochechouart castle

- Coat of arms
- Location of Rochechouart
- Location within France Location within Nouvelle-Aquitaine
- Coordinates: 45°49′26″N 0°49′18″E
- Country: France
- Region: Nouvelle-Aquitaine
- Department: Haute-Vienne
- Arrondissement: Rochechouart
- Canton: Rochechouart
- Intercommunality: CC Porte Océane du Limousin

Government
  - Mayor (2020–2026): Anne Marie Almoster-Rodrigues
- Area^{1}: 53.88 km^{2} (20.80 sq mi)
- Elevation: 265 m (869 ft)
- Highest elevation: 313 m (1,027 ft)
- Lowest elevation: 159 m (522 ft)
- Population (2023): 3,603
  - Density: 66.87/km^{2} (173.2/sq mi)
- Time zone: UTC+01:00 (CET)
  - Summer (DST): UTC+02:00 (CEST)
- INSEE/Postal code: 87126 /87600
- ^{1} French Land Register data, which excludes lakes, ponds, glaciers > 1 km^{2} (0.386 sq mi or 247 acres) and river estuaries.

Rochechouart (French pronunciation: [ʁɔʃ(ə)ʃwaʁ], commonly [ʁɔʃwaʁ]; Occitan: Rechoard, earlier La Ròcha Choard) is a commune in the department of Haute-Vienne, region of New Aquitaine, west central France. It is a subprefecture of the department.

The name of the town comes from Latin roca cavardi, which roughly translates as the rock of Cavardus, the lord who had the fortified place built at the beginning of the 11th century. More often than not, natives pronounce it [ʁoˈʃwaʁ], not *[ʁɔʃəˈʃwaʁ] as is its pronunciation in Standard French.

== History ==
Aymeric I, who lived around 990, was the first viscount and established the Rochechouartais dynasty. Aymeric IV took part in the First Crusade at the end of the 11th century at the side of Godfrey of Bouillon, and it was Aymeric VI (1170–1230) who built the present castle, the Château de Rochechouart, the keep and gatehouse of which remain standing.

At the end of the 13th century, Aimeric XI renounced a large part of his privileges and promulgated a charter of enfranchisement which transformed Rochechouart into a democratic city, and turned its inhabitants from slaves to the state into citizens. The city was from then on governed by four consuls who chose their own successors, without their lord's intervention. At the same time the viscount suppressed all direct taxes such as the "taille" and the "quête" and abolished duties of service to the feudal lord. He also accorded the inhabitants of Rochechouart the essential conditions for total liberty – they could dispose of their goods, buy or sell, import and export whatever they wanted, build, move about freely within the viscountcy, all without intervention from their lord. This Charter was very advanced for its times, and despite pressure from the other lords in the region, it remained in force until 1789. François de Rochechouart in the late 15th century is known for his study on the Dialogues of Pierre Salmon, the secretary of Charles VI of France. Before the French Revolution, Rochechouart administratively depended on the Province of Poitou, the viscounts of Rochechouart being vassals of the Count of Poitiers, and religiously, it was under the control of the diocese of Limoges.

== Geography ==
Rochechouart is situated at the confluence of the rivers Grêne and Vayres on the Plateau of Limousin, about 180 m (590 ft) above sea level. It is about 9 km (5.6 mi) south of Saint-Junien, the second largest town in the department of Haute-Vienne, and 45 km (28.0 mi) west of Limoges, the largest town and capital of the department. To the west lie the communes of Pressignac and Chassenon in the department of Charente, to the north lie the communes of Saillat-sur-Vienne and Chaillac-sur-Vienne, to the east lies Saint-Auvent and to the south Vayres.

The walled town of Rochechouart is overlooked by the château and houses a museum, the "Espace Meteorite Paul Pellas" which commemorates the meteorite crater. The château was taken over by the community in 1832 and now houses the town hall as well as a modern art collection, the "Musée Départmental d'Art Contemporain".

== Rochechouart impact structure ==
Rochechouart is situated in the Rochechouart impact structure, an impact crater caused by an asteroid that crashed into the Earth's surface about 205 million years ago, in the Rhaetian period, shortly before the Triassic Jurassic boundary characterized by a massive extinction event in which 80% of the world's species were obliterated.

== Population changes ==
Inhabitants are known as Rochechouartais.

Historical population
Year	Pop.	±% p.a.
1968	4,059	—
1975	4,196	+0.48%
1982	4,053	−0.49%
1990	3,985	−0.21%
1999	3,667	−0.92%
2007	3,839	+0.57%
2012	3,794	−0.24%
2017	3,778	−0.08%
2026	3,603	−0.53%
Source: INSEE

== Gallery ==
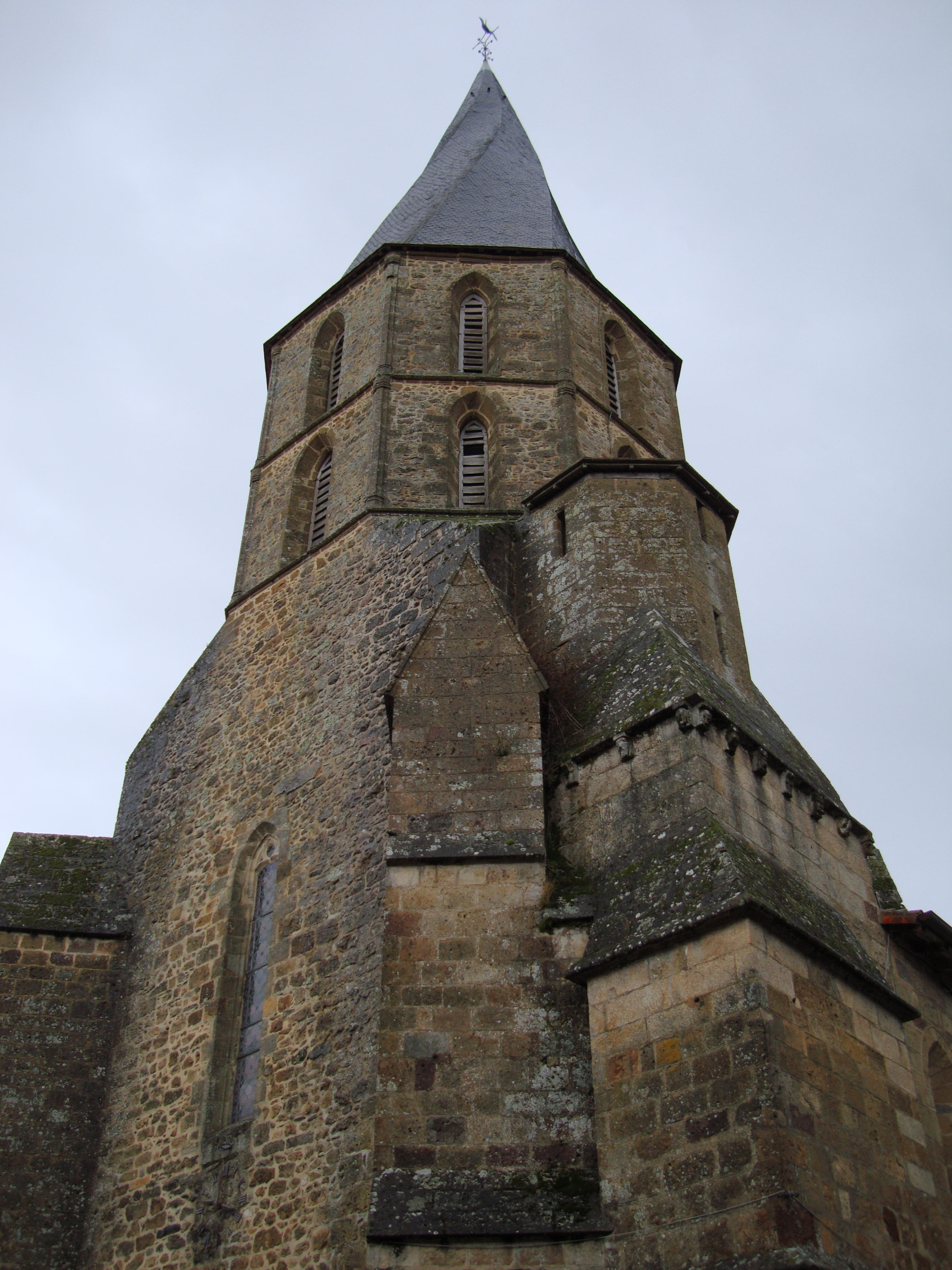

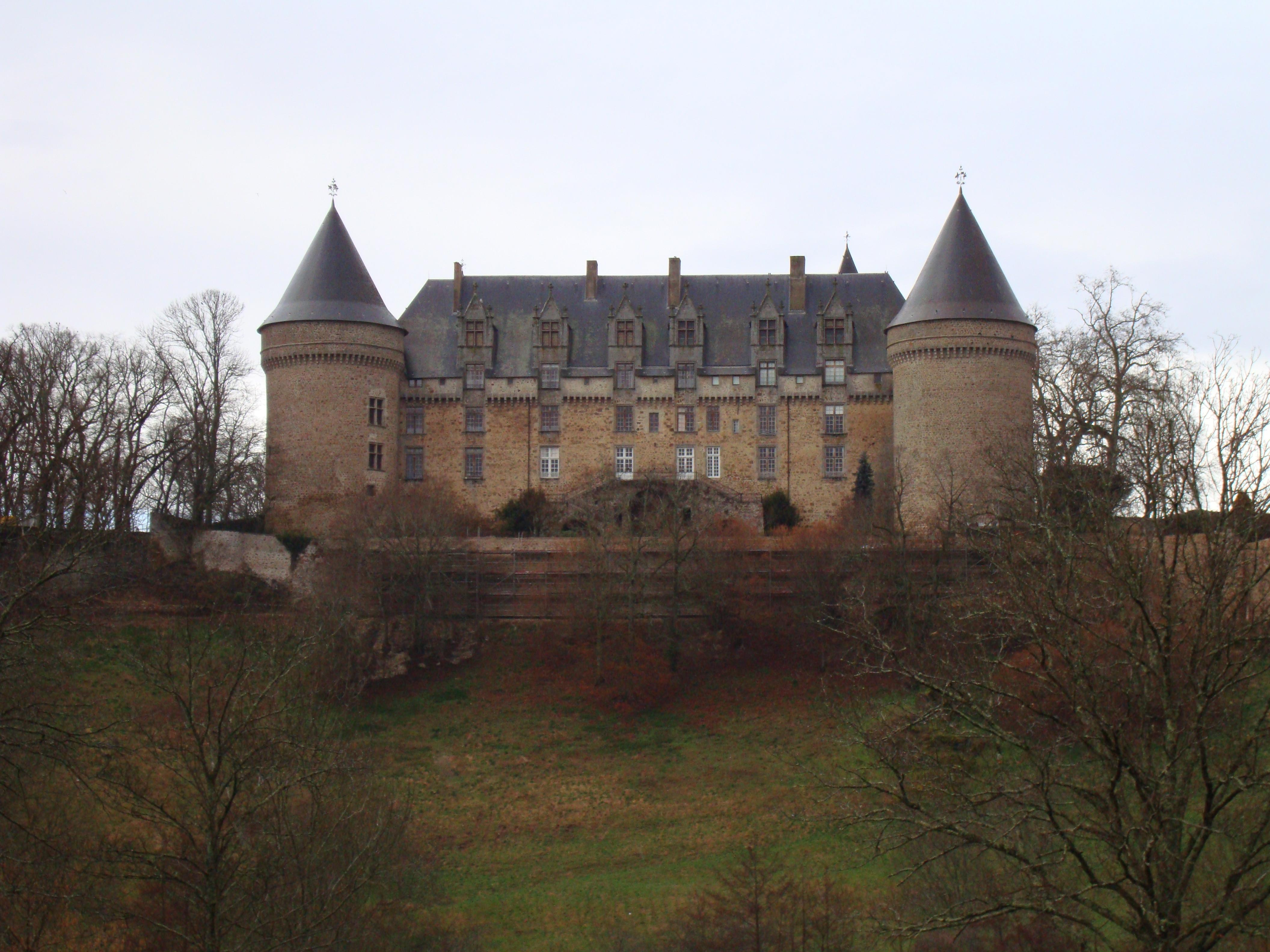

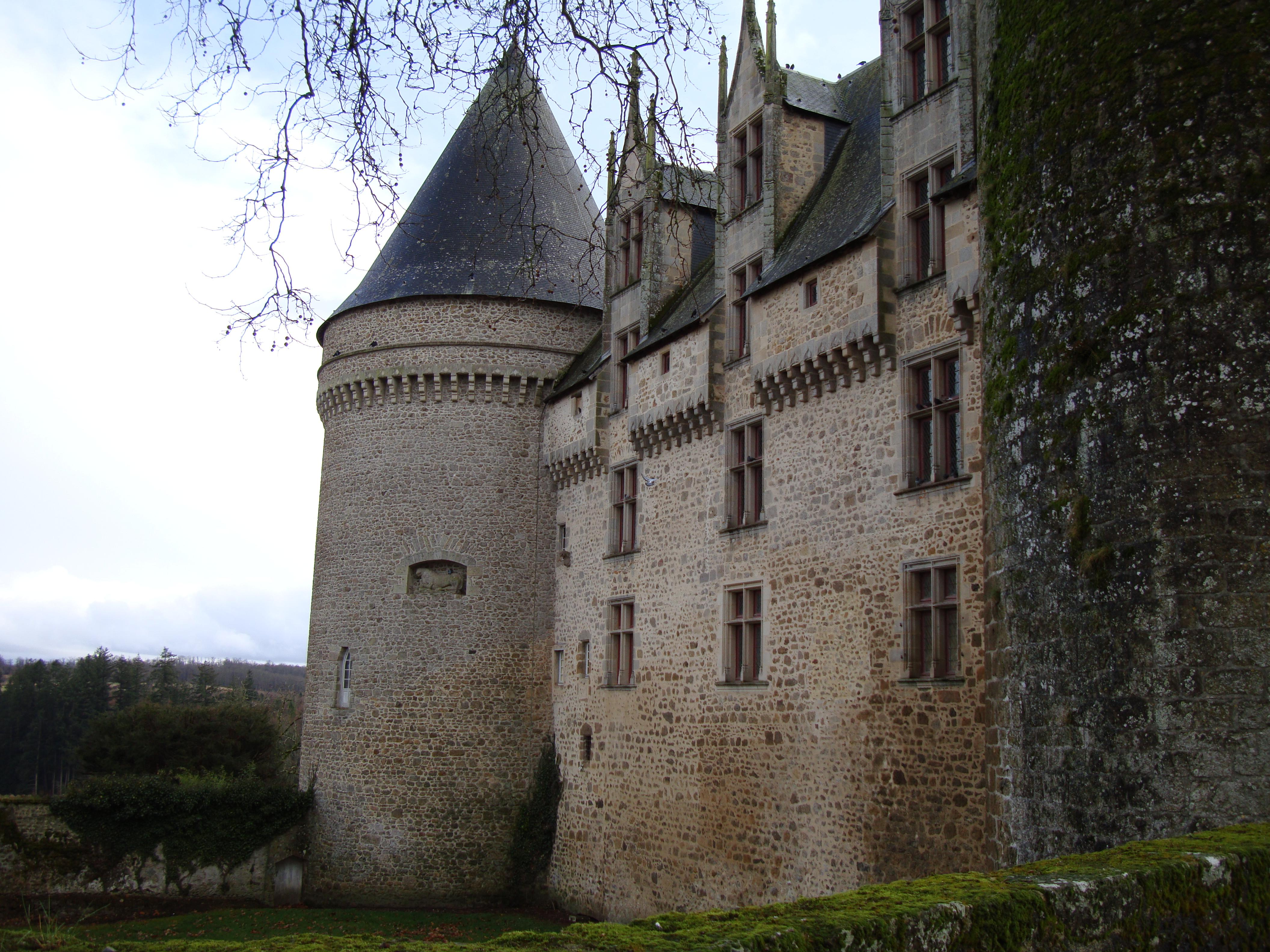

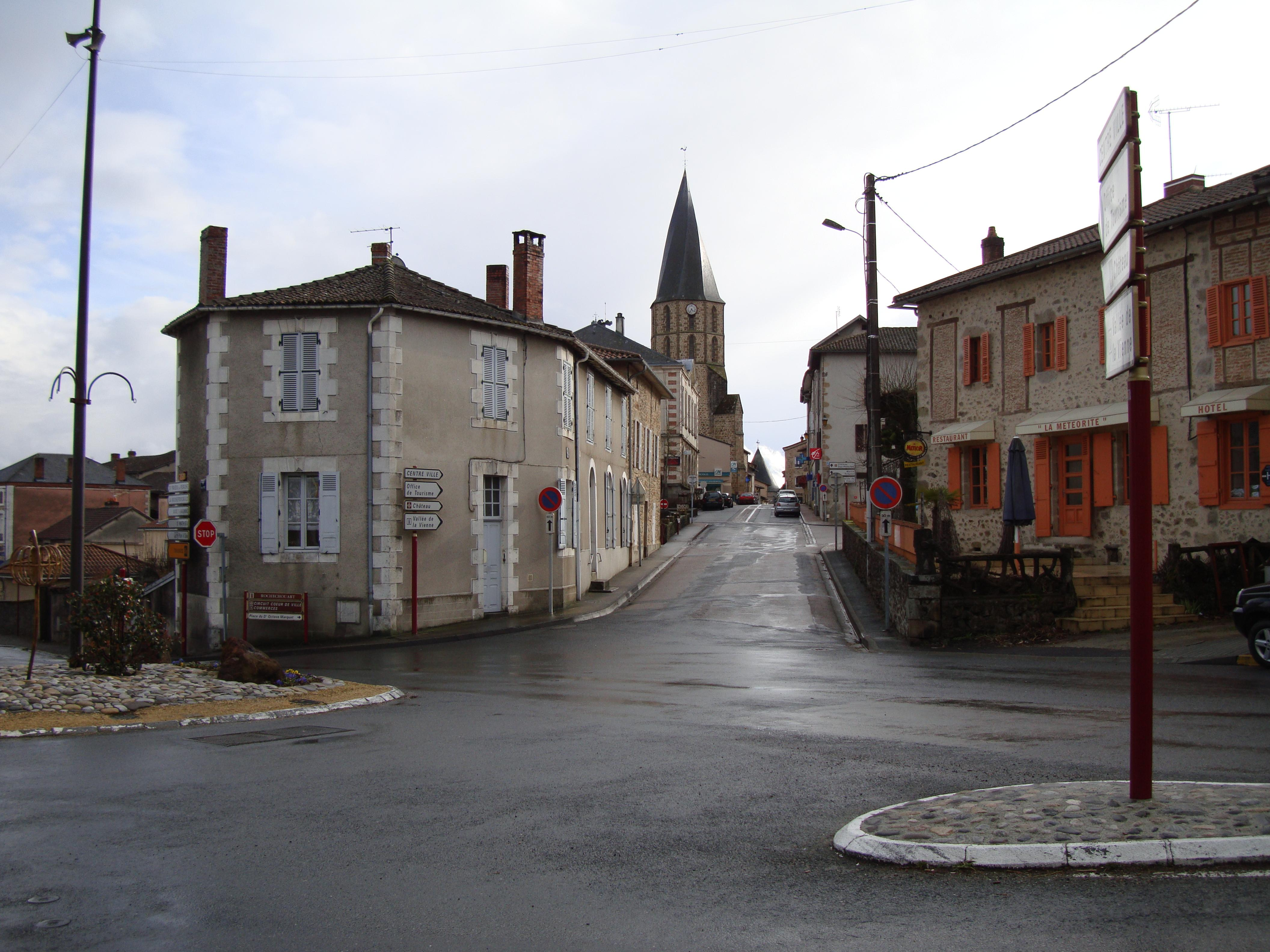

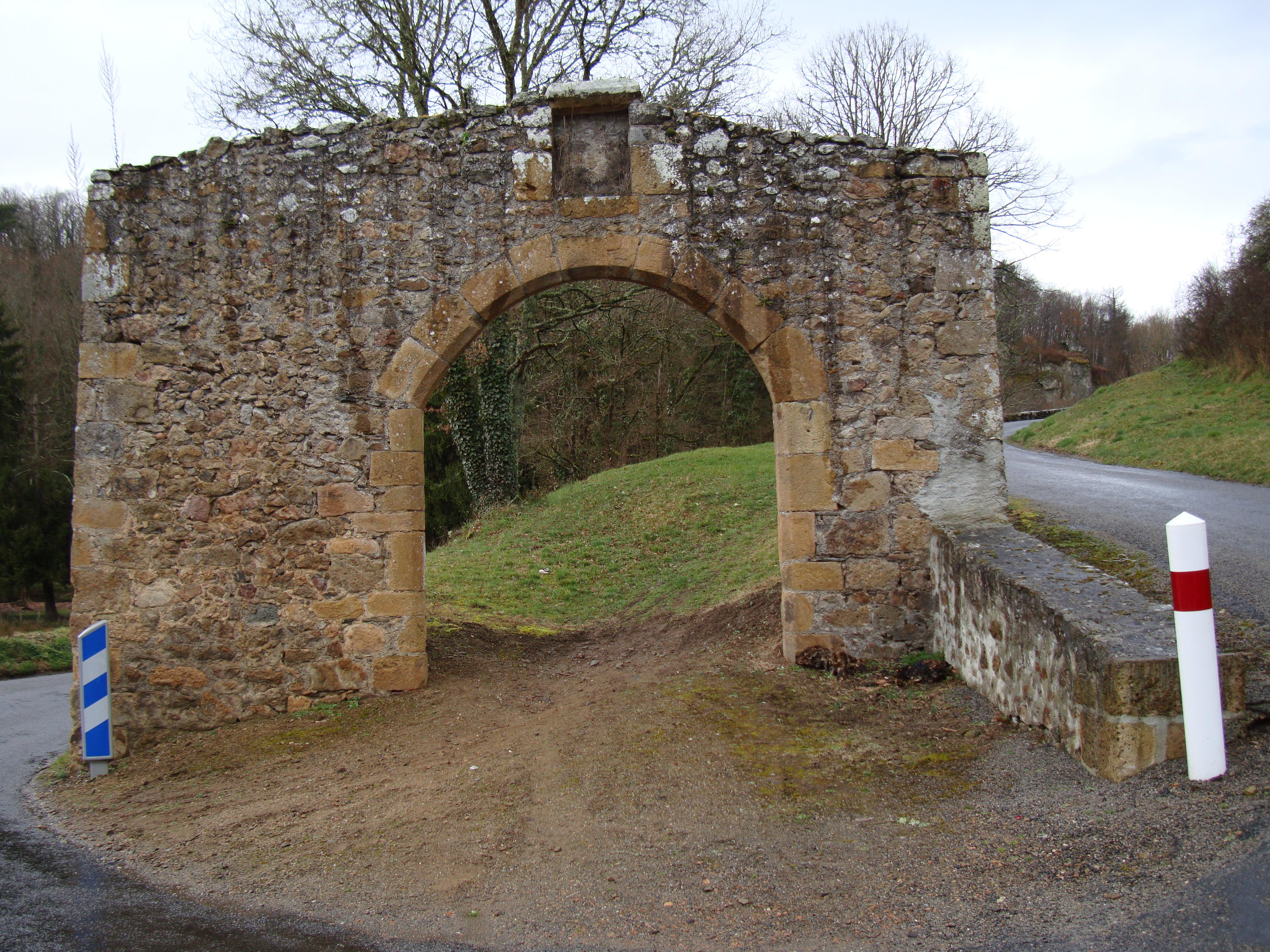

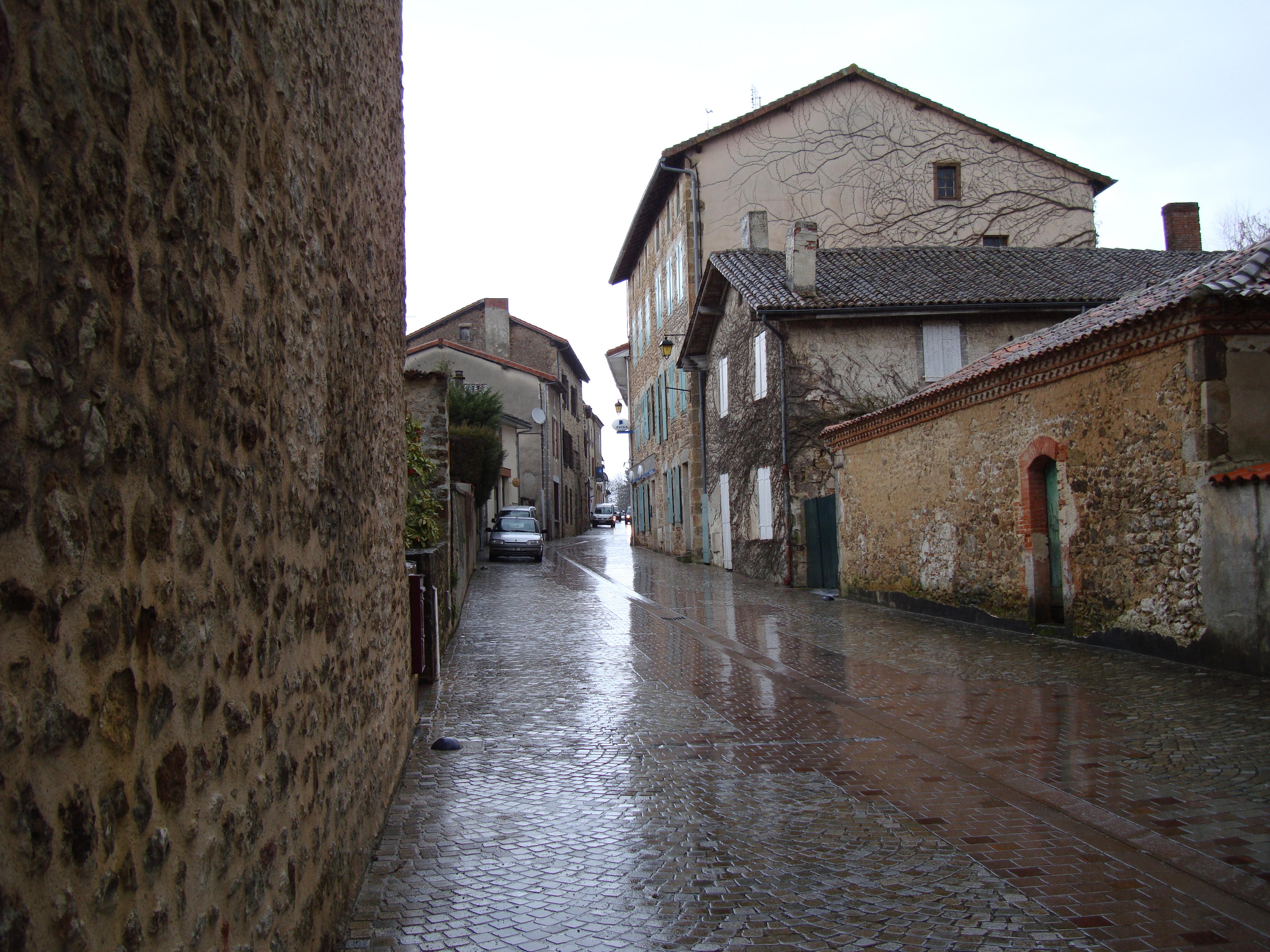

== See also ==
- House of Rochechouart
- Communes of the Haute-Vienne department
