= Martin of Arades =

French monk and saint (died 726)

Saint Martin of Corbie

Venerable
- Died: 26 November 726; Saint-Priest-sous-Aixe
- Venerated in: Roman Catholic Church; Eastern Orthodox Church
- Major shrine: Saint-Priest-sous-Aixe
- Feast: 26 November
- Patronage: Aixe-sur-Vienne, Saint-Priest-sous-Aixe, gout

Martin of Arades, also known as Martin of Corbie (died 26 November 726), was a Frankish Christian monk from Corbie Abbey, who is venerated as a saint in the Roman Catholic Church and Eastern Orthodox Church. His feast day is 26 November.

He was the chaplain and confessor of the Frankish Mayor of the Palace Charles Martel. He died in Saint-Priest-sous-Aixe and was buried there. He is the patron saint of gout.
