= Saint Junian =

Saint Junian is the name of:

- Junian of Saint-Junien (born c. 480), after whom the commune Saint-Junien is named
- Junian of Mairé (died 587), of the Poitou region

== See also ==
- Saint-Junien, commune
