= Oradour-sur-Glane =

Oradour-sur-Glane Orador de Glana (Occitan)
- Commune
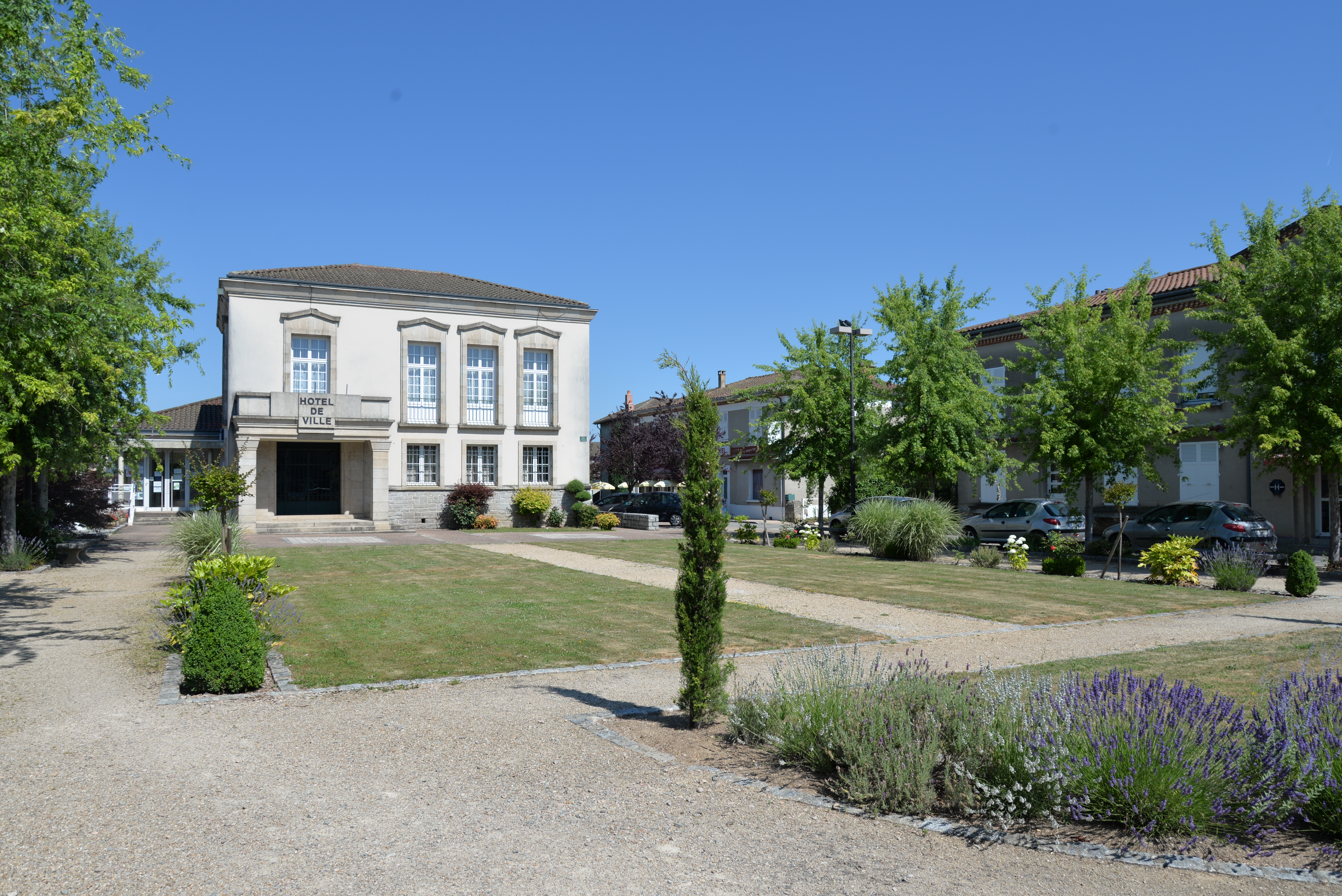
- Oradour-sur-Glane Town Hall

- Coat of arms
- Location of Oradour-sur-Glane
- Location within France Location within Nouvelle-Aquitaine
- Coordinates: 45°55′58″N 1°01′57″E
- Country: France
- Region: Nouvelle-Aquitaine
- Department: Haute-Vienne
- Arrondissement: Rochechouart
- Canton: Saint-Junien

Government
  - Mayor (2020–2026): Philippe Lacroix
- Area^{1}: 38.16 km^{2} (14.73 sq mi)
- Elevation: 285 m (935 ft)
- Highest elevation: 312 m (1,024 ft)
- Lowest elevation: 227 m (745 ft)
- Population (2023): 2,550
  - Density: 66.8/km^{2} (173/sq mi)
- Time zone: UTC+01:00 (CET)
  - Summer (DST): UTC+02:00 (CEST)
- INSEE/Postal code: 87110 /87520
- ^{1} French Land Register data, which excludes lakes, ponds, glaciers > 1 km^{2} (0.386 sq mi or 247 acres) and river estuaries.

Oradour-sur-Glane (French pronunciation: [ɔʁaduʁ syʁ ɡlan]; Occitan: Orador de Glana) is a commune in the Haute-Vienne department, Nouvelle-Aquitaine, west central France, as well as the name of the main village within the commune. It had a population of 2,477 as of 2019.

The original village of Oradour-sur-Glane was destroyed and its inhabitants massacred by German soldiers during World War II. It was subsequently left in its destroyed state as a memorial.

== History ==
The original village was destroyed on 10 June 1944, four days after D-Day, when 642 of its inhabitants, including 207 children, were massacred by a company of troops belonging to the 2nd SS Panzer Division Das Reich, a Waffen-SS unit of the military forces of Nazi Germany. There were only 10 survivors, who escaped by pretending to be dead. SS Sturmbannführer Adolf Diekmann, the commanding officer of the Der Führer regiment of the Das Reich division, had wanted to destroy another French town, Oradour-sur-Vayres, whose people were said to be providing food and shelter to the Maquis, but had taken a wrong turn on the road, which led him and his men to Oradour-sur-Glane, whose people had never supported the Maquis.

A new village was built after the war on a nearby site, but on the orders of President Charles de Gaulle, the original has been maintained as a permanent memorial. The Centre de la mémoire d'Oradour museum is situated adjacent to the historic site.

The massacre at Oradour-sur-Glane bookends the documentary series The World at War, the first and final episodes showing images of the ruined village.

== Personalities linked to the commune ==
- Robert Hébras (29 June 1925 – 11 February 2023) was one of the six survivors of the Oradour-sur-Glane massacre on 10 June 1944.
- Jean-Claude Peyronnet (born 1940), French politician and creator of the Centre of the Memory of Oradour-sur-Glane.
- Sébastien Puygrenier (born 1982) began his football career at US Oradour-sur-Glane, where his father and his uncles had played.
- Didier Barbelivien (born 1954), a French singer-songwriter, paid tribute to Oradour in his song "Les amants d'Oradour".

== Geography ==
The municipality borders Javerdat, Cieux, Peyrilhac, Veyrac, Saint-Victurnien and Saint-Brice-sur-Vienne.

== Demographics ==
Historical population

Year	Pop.	±% p.a.
1793	1,303	—
1800	1,191	−1.28%
1806	1,222	+0.43%
1821	1,585	+1.75%
1831	1,722	+0.83%
1836	1,740	+0.21%
1841	1,824	+0.95%
1846	1,989	+1.75%
1851	1,919	−0.71%
1856	1,952	+0.34%
1861	1,848	−1.09%
1866	1,874	+0.28%
1872	1,830	−0.40%
1876	1,903	+0.98%
1881	1,946	+0.45%
1886	1,940	−0.06%
1891	2,045	+1.06%
1896	2,030	−0.15%
1901	1,966	−0.64%

Year	Pop.	±% p.a.
1906	1,972	+0.06%
1911	2,019	+0.47%
1921	1,789	−1.20%
1926	1,718	−0.81%
1931	1,601	−1.40%
1936	1,574	−0.34%
1946	1,145	−3.13%
1954	1,450	+3.00%
1962	1,540	+0.76%
1968	1,671	+1.37%
1975	1,759	+0.74%
1982	1,941	+1.42%
1990	1,998	+0.36%
1999	2,025	+0.15%
2007	2,205	+1.07%
2012	2,375	+1.50%
2017	2,473	+0.81%
2023	2,550	+0.51%

Source: EHESS and INSEE

== Gallery ==
Map showing modern and former village

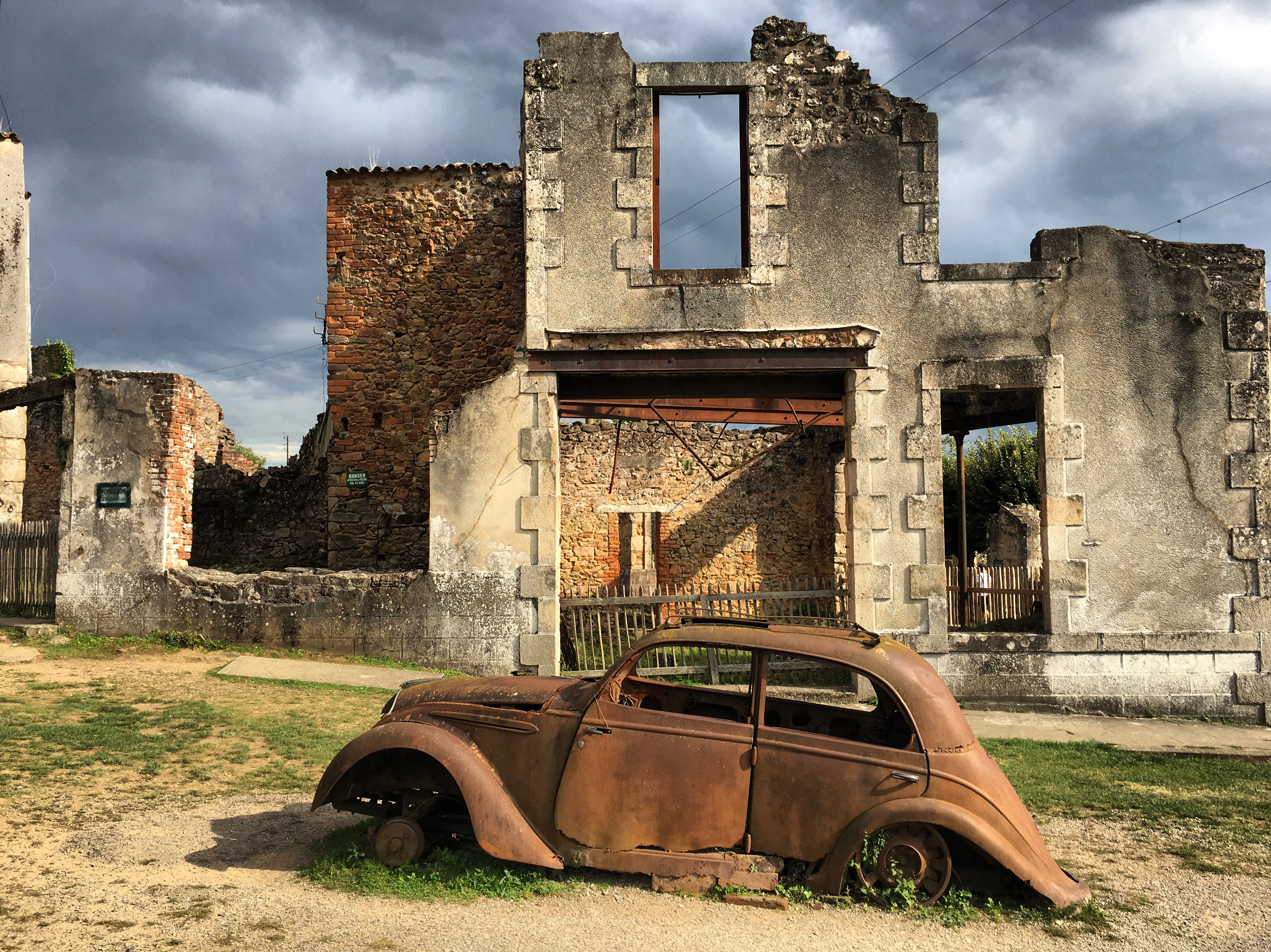

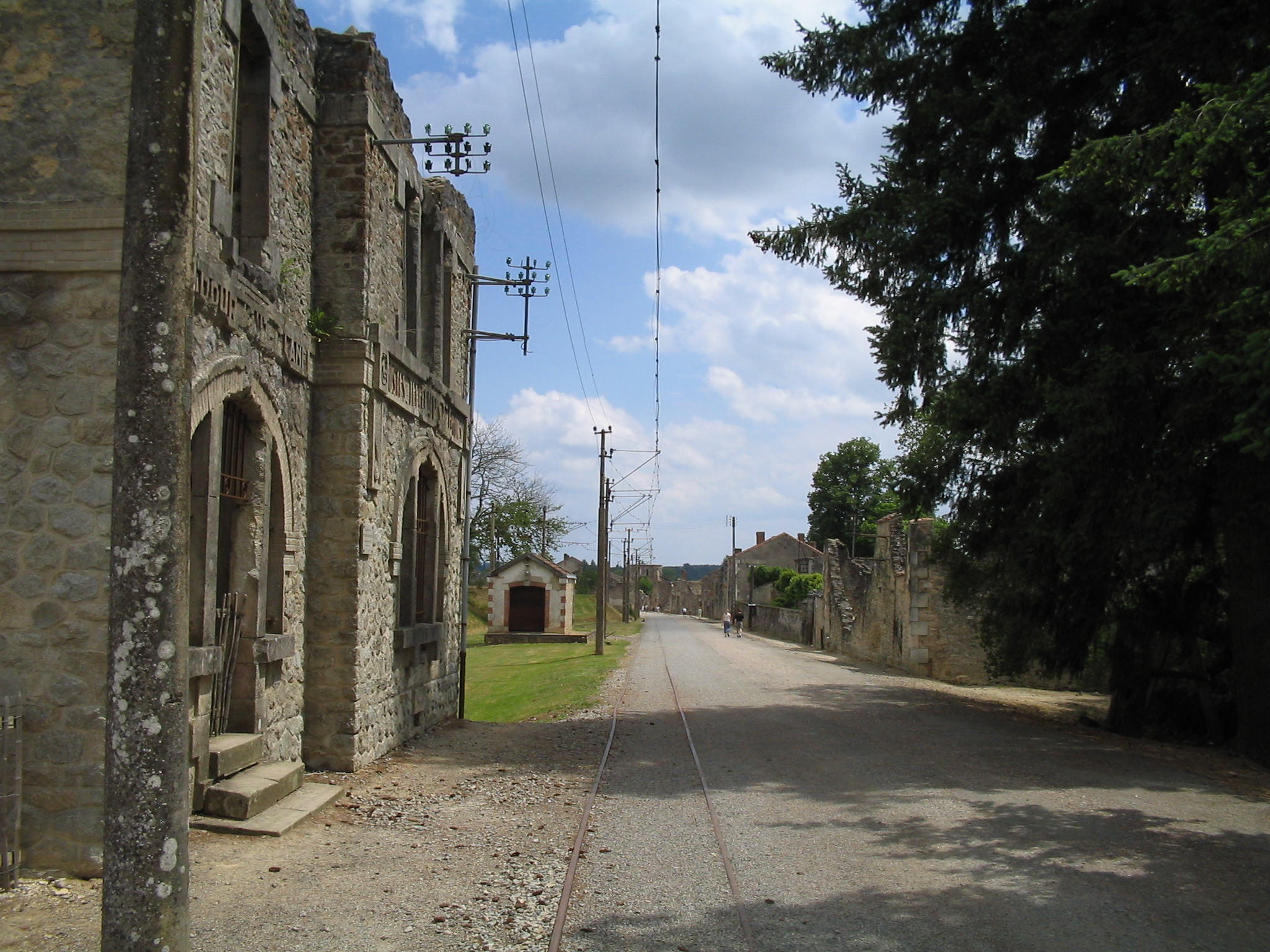
Details of rails and catenary of the tramway.

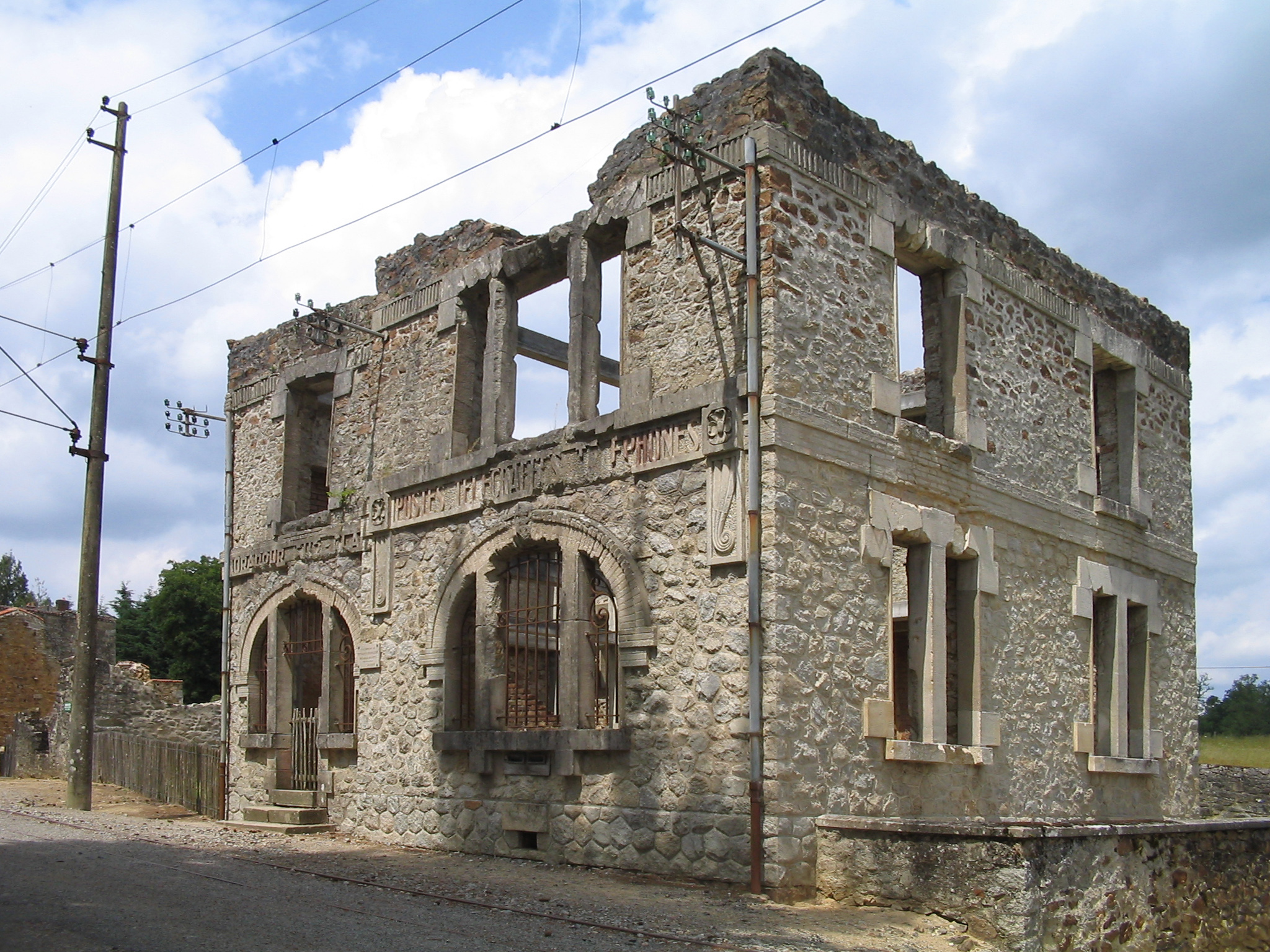
Post office

== See also ==
- Lidice, a Czech village destroyed by Nazi forces in 1942

== Bibliography ==
- Farmer, Sarah. Martyred Village: Commemorating the 1944 Massacre at Oradour-sur-Glane. University of California Press, 2000.
- Fouché, Jean-Jacques. Massacre At Oradour: France, 1944; Coming To Grips With Terror, Northern Illinois University Press, 2004.
- Penaud, Guy. La "Das Reich" 2e SS Panzer Division (Parcours de la division en France, 560 pp), Éditions de La Lauze/Périgueux. ISBN 2-912032-76-8
