= Saint-Victurnien =

- Commune
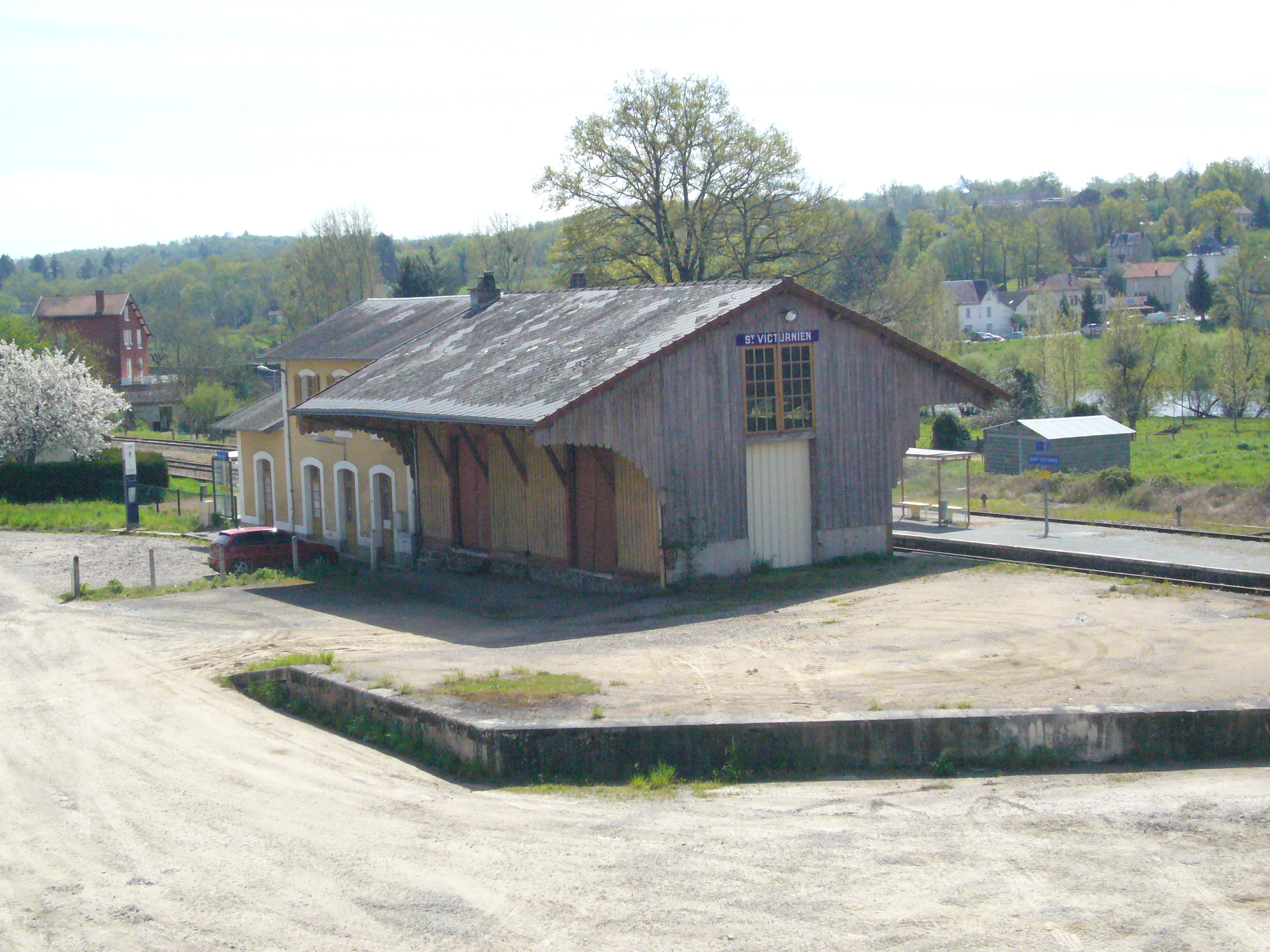
- The Saint-Victurnien railway station, on the Limoges-Angoulême line

- Coat of arms
- Location of Saint-Victurnien
- Location within France Location within Nouvelle-Aquitaine
- Coordinates: 45°52′42″N 1°00′51″E
- Country: France
- Region: Nouvelle-Aquitaine
- Department: Haute-Vienne
- Arrondissement: Rochechouart
- Canton: Saint-Junien

Government
  - Mayor (2020–2026): Jean Duchambon
- Area^{1}: 21.04 km^{2} (8.12 sq mi)
- Highest elevation: 323 m (1,060 ft)
- Lowest elevation: 172 m (564 ft)
- Population (2023): 1,774
  - Density: 84.32/km^{2} (218.4/sq mi)
- Time zone: UTC+01:00 (CET)
  - Summer (DST): UTC+02:00 (CEST)
- INSEE/Postal code: 87185 /87420
- ^{1} French Land Register data, which excludes lakes, ponds, glaciers > 1 km^{2} (0.386 sq mi or 247 acres) and river estuaries.

Saint-Victurnien (French pronunciation: [sɛ̃ viktyʁnjɛ̃]; Occitan: Sent Vertunian) is a commune in the Haute-Vienne department in the Nouvelle-Aquitaine region in west-central France. Its inhabitants are called Saint-Victurniauds.

The village is the only one between Saint-Junien and Aixe-sur-Vienne which extends over both banks of the river Vienne. It is located 10 km east of Saint-Junien and 20 km west of Limoges.

== See also ==
- Communes of the Haute-Vienne department
