= Saint-Martin-le-Vieux =

- Commune
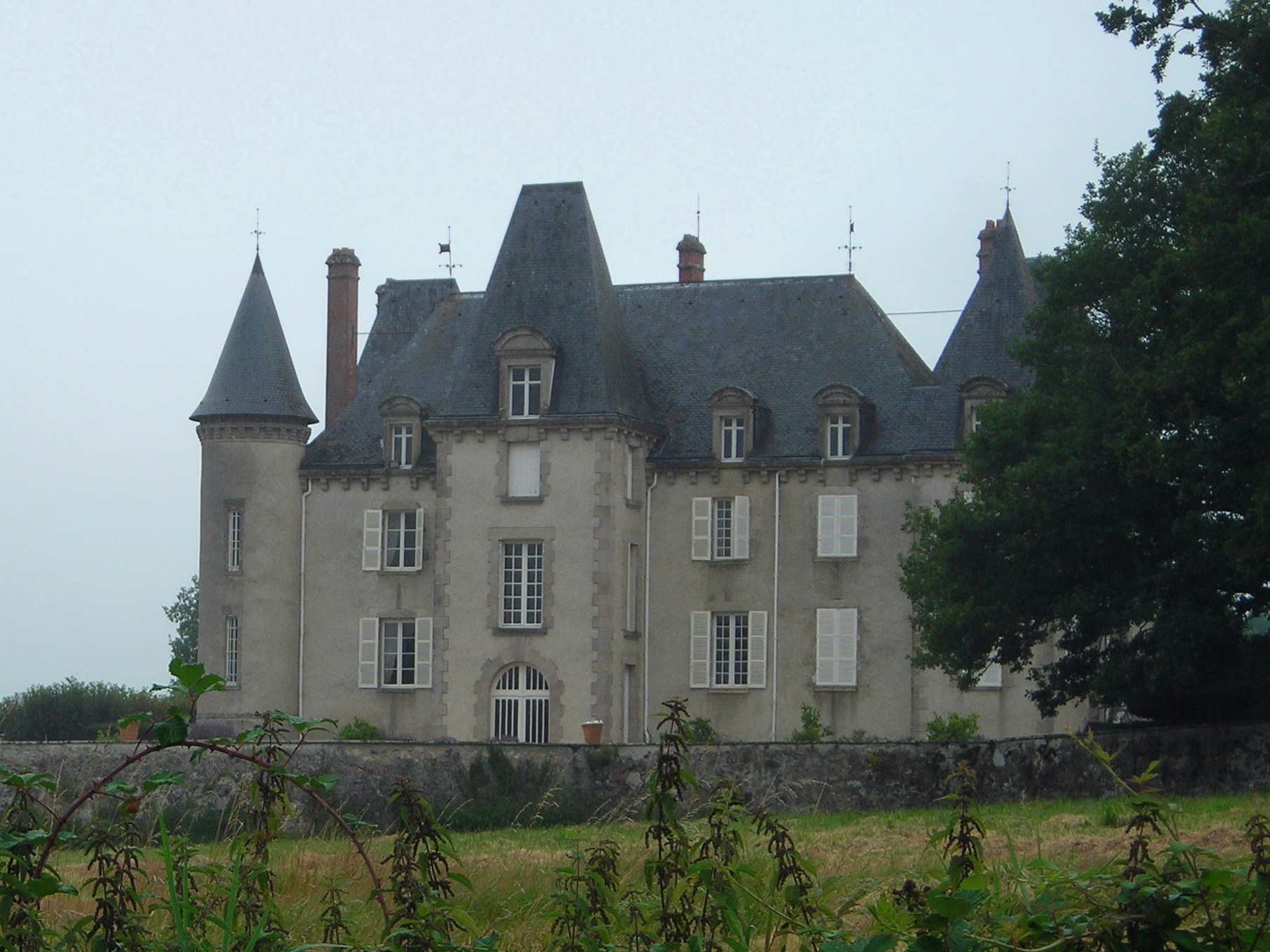
- The Chateau de la Judie, in Saint-Martin-le-Vieux

- Coat of arms
- Location of Saint-Martin-le-Vieux
- Location within France Location within Nouvelle-Aquitaine
- Coordinates: 45°44′45″N 1°07′09″E
- Country: France
- Region: Nouvelle-Aquitaine
- Department: Haute-Vienne
- Arrondissement: Limoges
- Canton: Aixe-sur-Vienne
- Intercommunality: Val de Vienne

Government
  - Mayor (2020–2026): Sylvie Achard
- Area^{1}: 17.49 km^{2} (6.75 sq mi)
- Highest elevation: 331 m (1,086 ft)
- Lowest elevation: 220 m (720 ft)
- Population (2023): 865
  - Density: 49.5/km^{2} (128/sq mi)
- Time zone: UTC+01:00 (CET)
  - Summer (DST): UTC+02:00 (CEST)
- INSEE/Postal code: 87166 /87700
- ^{1} French Land Register data, which excludes lakes, ponds, glaciers > 1 km^{2} (0.386 sq mi or 247 acres) and river estuaries.

Saint-Martin-le-Vieux (French pronunciation: [sɛ̃ maʁtɛ̃ lə vjø]; Occitan: Sent Martin lu Vielh) is a commune in the Haute-Vienne department in the Nouvelle-Aquitaine region in west-central France.

== See also ==
- Communes of the Haute-Vienne department
