= Canton of Saint-Junien =

Coordinates: 45.89°N 0.90°E

The canton of Saint-Junien is an administrative division of the Haute-Vienne department, western France. It was created at the French canton reorganisation which came into effect in March 2015. Its seat is in Saint-Junien.

It consists of the following communes:

1. Chaillac-sur-Vienne
2. Javerdat
3. Oradour-sur-Glane
4. Saillat-sur-Vienne
5. Saint-Brice-sur-Vienne
6. Saint-Junien
7. Saint-Martin-de-Jussac
8. Saint-Victurnien
