= Séreilhac =

- Commune
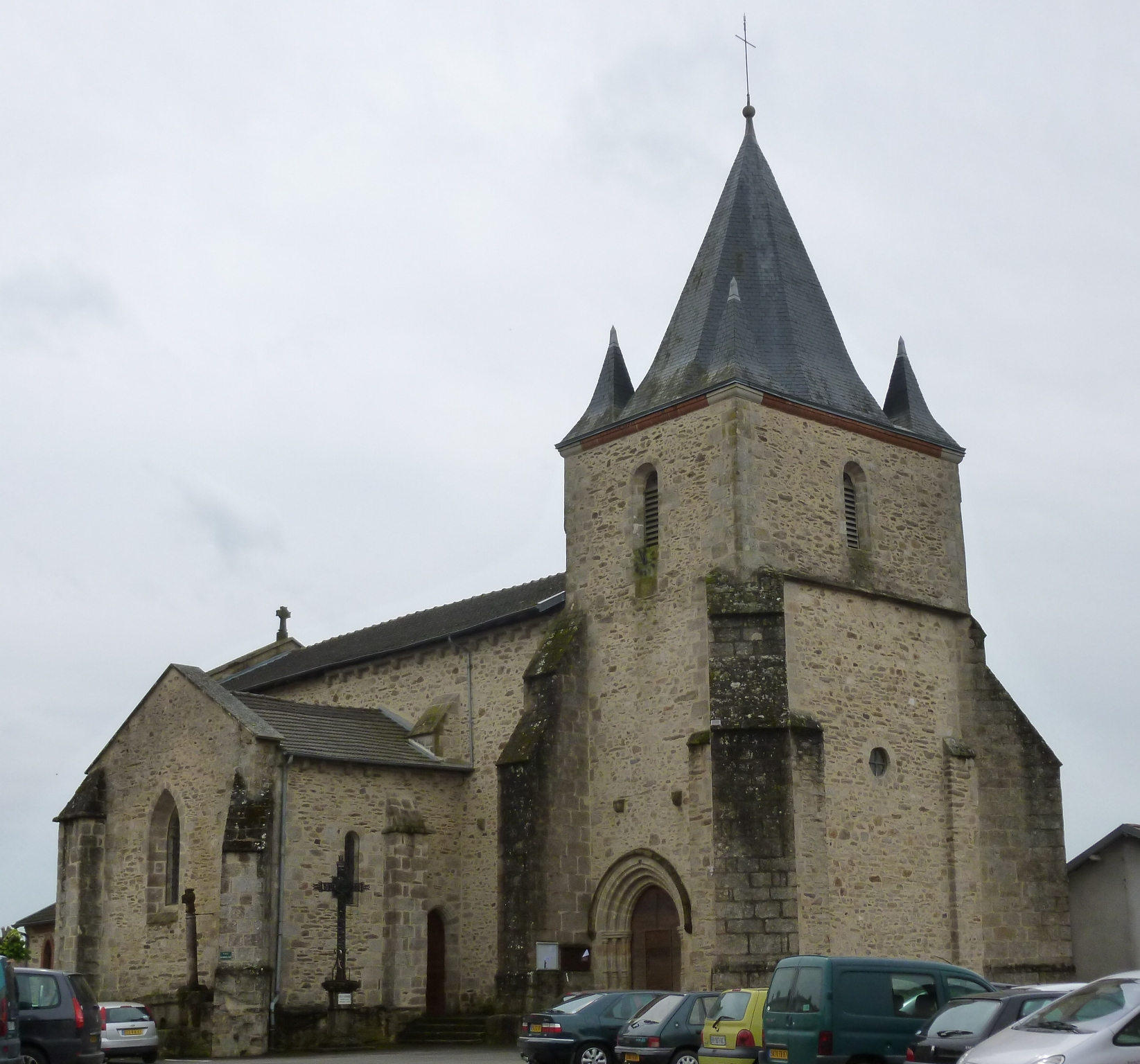
- The church in Séreilhac

- Coat of arms
- Location of Séreilhac
- Location within France Location within Nouvelle-Aquitaine
- Coordinates: 45°46′12″N 1°04′58″E
- Country: France
- Region: Nouvelle-Aquitaine
- Department: Haute-Vienne
- Arrondissement: Limoges
- Canton: Aixe-sur-Vienne
- Intercommunality: Val de Vienne

Government
  - Mayor (2020–2026): Loïc Cottin
- Area^{1}: 38.63 km^{2} (14.92 sq mi)
- Highest elevation: 420 m (1,380 ft)
- Lowest elevation: 218 m (715 ft)
- Population (2023): 2,003
  - Density: 51.85/km^{2} (134.3/sq mi)
- Time zone: UTC+01:00 (CET)
  - Summer (DST): UTC+02:00 (CEST)
- INSEE/Postal code: 87191 /87620
- ^{1} French Land Register data, which excludes lakes, ponds, glaciers > 1 km^{2} (0.386 sq mi or 247 acres) and river estuaries.

Séreilhac (French pronunciation: [seʁɛjak]; Occitan: Cerelhac) is a commune in the Haute-Vienne department in the Nouvelle-Aquitaine region in west-central France.

== Population ==
Historical population
Year	Pop.	±% p.a.
1968	1,362	—
1975	1,352	−0.11%
1982	1,462	+1.12%
1990	1,614	+1.24%
1999	1,595	−0.13%
2007	1,734	+1.05%
2012	1,861	+1.42%
2017	1,992	+1.37%
2023	2,003	+0.09%
Source: INSEE

Inhabitants are known as Séreilhacois in French.

== See also ==
- Communes of the Haute-Vienne department
