= Burgnac =

- Commune
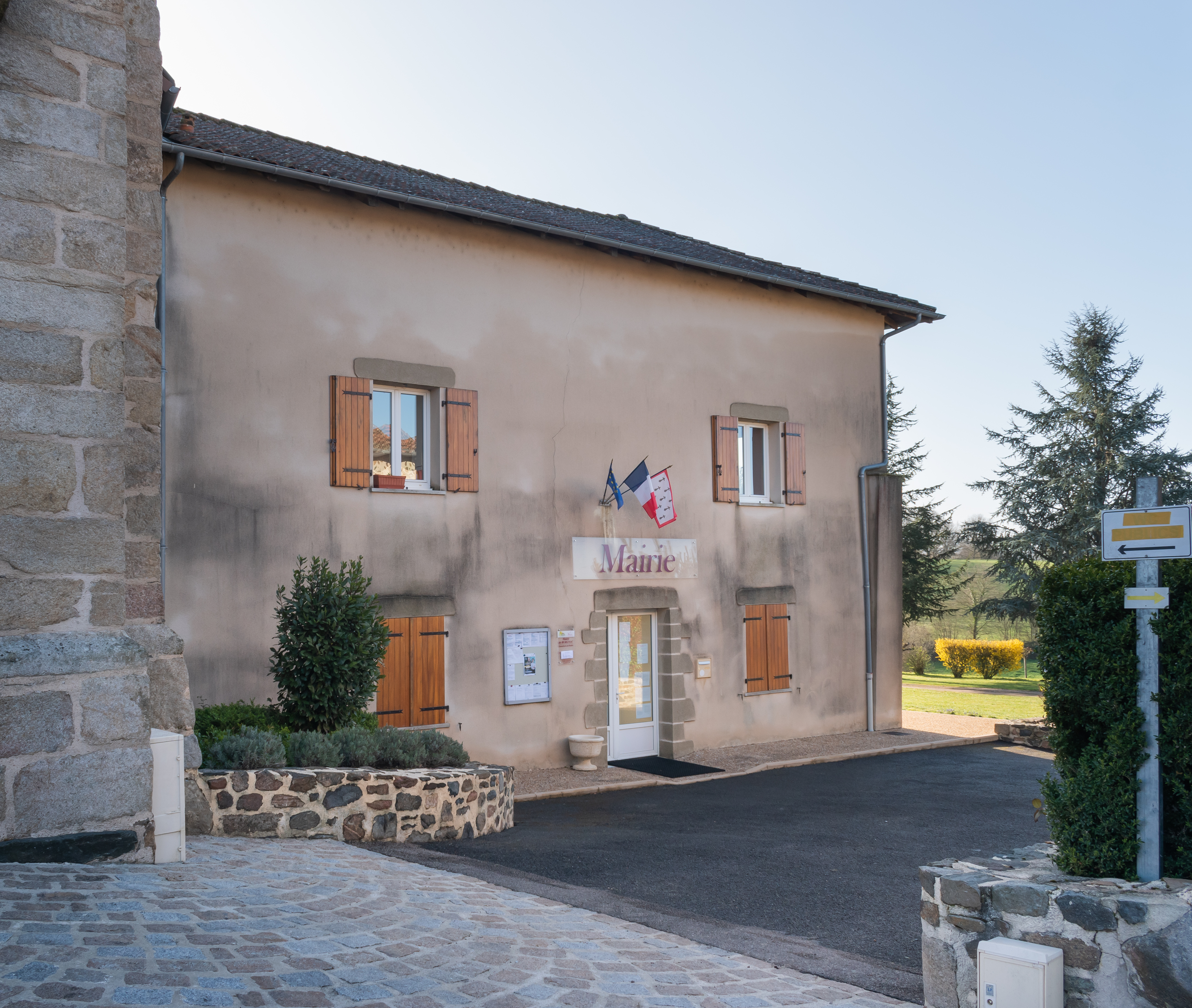
- Town hall of Burgnac
- Location of Burgnac
- Location within France Location within Nouvelle-Aquitaine
- Coordinates: 45°43′37″N 1°09′08″E
- Country: France
- Region: Nouvelle-Aquitaine
- Department: Haute-Vienne
- Arrondissement: Limoges
- Canton: Aixe-sur-Vienne
- Intercommunality: Val de Vienne

Government
  - Mayor (2020–2026): Michel Rebeyrol
- Area^{1}: 11.50 km^{2} (4.44 sq mi)
- Highest elevation: 352 m (1,155 ft)
- Lowest elevation: 229 m (751 ft)
- Population (2023): 861
  - Density: 74.9/km^{2} (194/sq mi)
- Time zone: UTC+01:00 (CET)
  - Summer (DST): UTC+02:00 (CEST)
- INSEE/Postal code: 87025 /87800
- ^{1} French Land Register data, which excludes lakes, ponds, glaciers > 1 km^{2} (0.386 sq mi or 247 acres) and river estuaries.

Burgnac (French pronunciation: [byʁɲak]; Occitan: Burnhac) is a commune in the Haute-Vienne department in the Nouvelle-Aquitaine region in western France.

== See also ==
- Communes of the Haute-Vienne department
