= Beynac =

- Commune
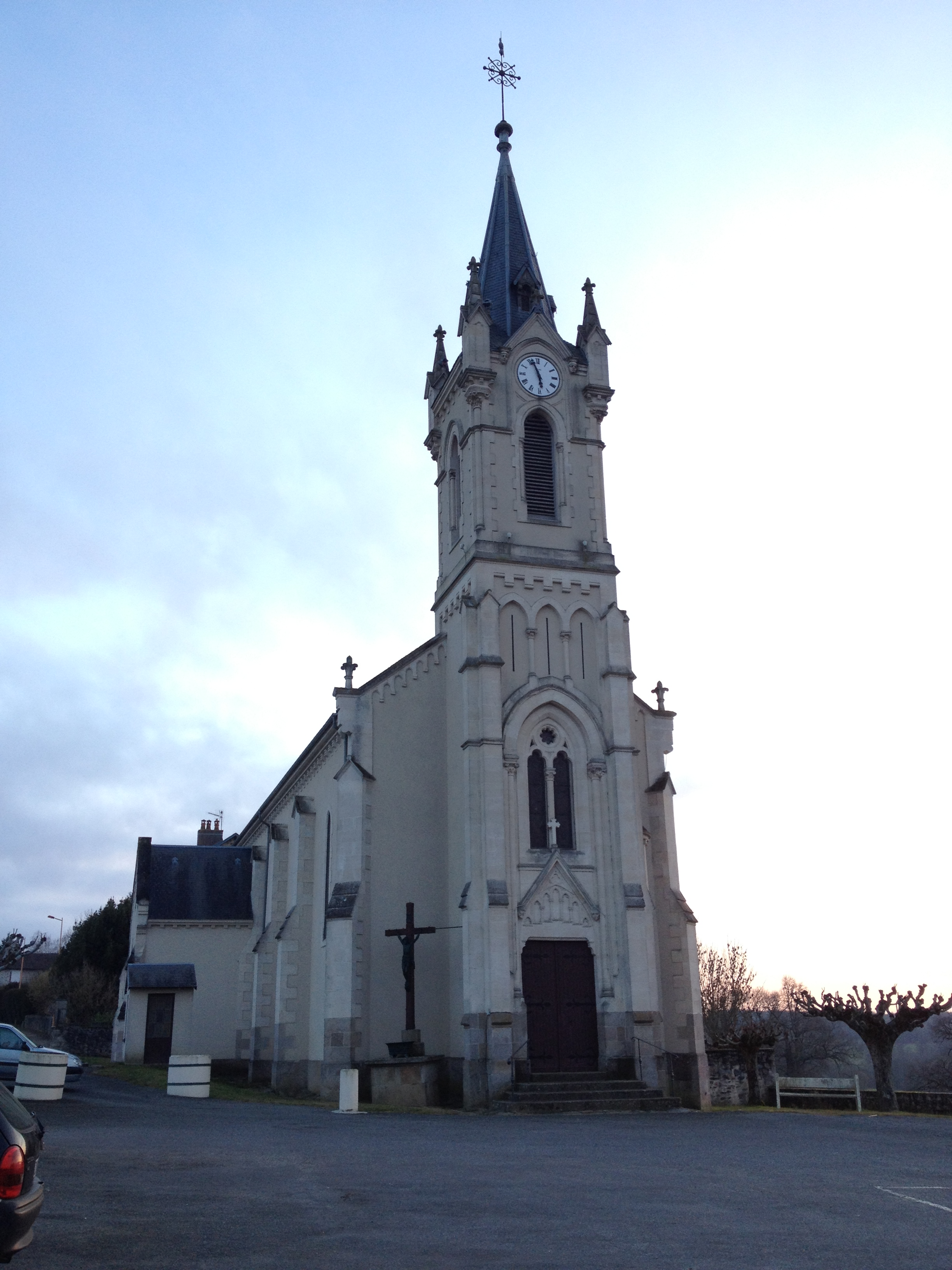
- The Beynac Church

- Coat of arms
- Location of Beynac
- Location within France Location within Nouvelle-Aquitaine
- Coordinates: 45°46′05″N 1°10′08″E
- Country: France
- Region: Nouvelle-Aquitaine
- Department: Haute-Vienne
- Arrondissement: Limoges
- Canton: Aixe-sur-Vienne
- Intercommunality: Val de Vienne

Government
  - Mayor (2020–2026): Marie-Claude Beyrand
- Area^{1}: 12.57 km^{2} (4.85 sq mi)
- Highest elevation: 356 m (1,168 ft)
- Lowest elevation: 207 m (679 ft)
- Population (2023): 735
  - Density: 58.5/km^{2} (151/sq mi)
- Time zone: UTC+01:00 (CET)
  - Summer (DST): UTC+02:00 (CEST)
- INSEE/Postal code: 87015 /87700
- ^{1} French Land Register data, which excludes lakes, ponds, glaciers > 1 km^{2} (0.386 sq mi or 247 acres) and river estuaries.

Beynac (French pronunciation: [benak]; Occitan: Beinac) is a commune in the Haute-Vienne department in the Nouvelle-Aquitaine region in central-western France.

Inhabitants are known as Beynacois in French.

== See also ==
- Communes of the Haute-Vienne department
