= Saint-Martin-de-Jussac =

- Commune
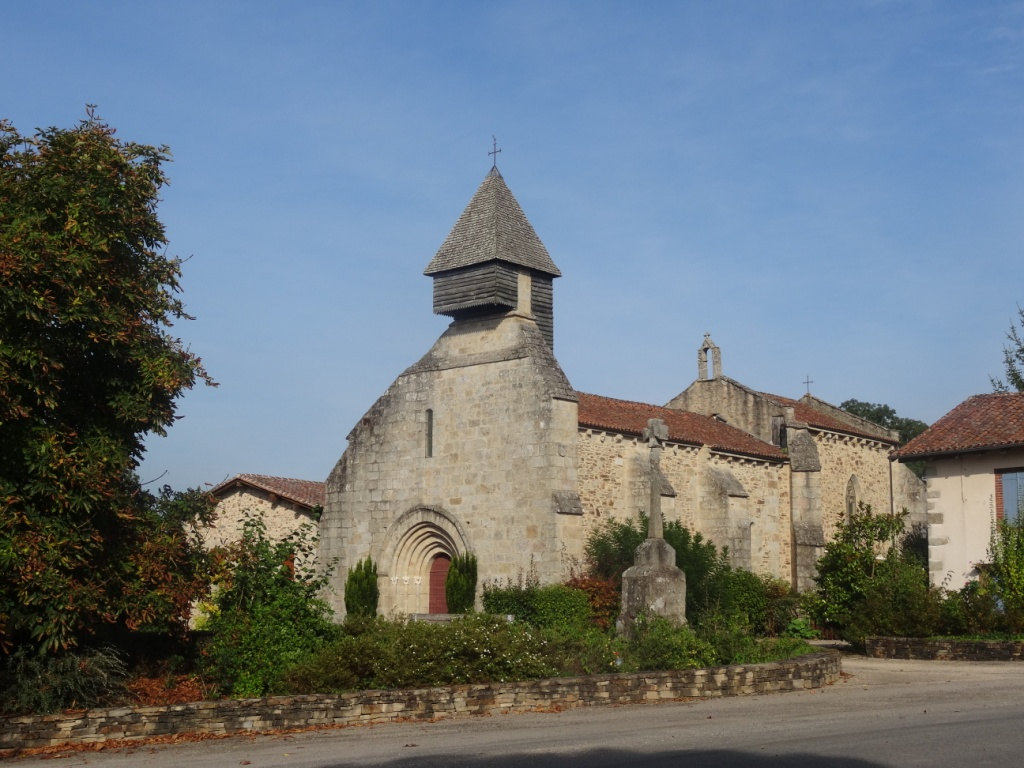
- The church in Saint-Martin-de-Jussac

- Coat of arms
- Location of Saint-Martin-de-Jussac
- Location within France Location within Nouvelle-Aquitaine
- Coordinates: 45°52′41″N 0°56′29″E
- Country: France
- Region: Nouvelle-Aquitaine
- Department: Haute-Vienne
- Arrondissement: Rochechouart
- Canton: Saint-Junien

Government
  - Mayor (2020–2026): Alain Favraud
- Area^{1}: 14.40 km^{2} (5.56 sq mi)
- Highest elevation: 297 m (974 ft)
- Lowest elevation: 167 m (548 ft)
- Population (2023): 571
  - Density: 39.7/km^{2} (103/sq mi)
- Time zone: UTC+01:00 (CET)
  - Summer (DST): UTC+02:00 (CEST)
- INSEE/Postal code: 87164 /87200
- ^{1} French Land Register data, which excludes lakes, ponds, glaciers > 1 km^{2} (0.386 sq mi or 247 acres) and river estuaries.

Saint-Martin-de-Jussac (French pronunciation: [sɛ̃ maʁtɛ̃ də ʒysak]; Occitan: Sent Martin de Jussac) is a commune in the Haute-Vienne department in the Nouvelle-Aquitaine region in west-central France.

== See also ==
- Communes of the Haute-Vienne department
