= Canton of Aixe-sur-Vienne =

Coordinates: 45.79°N 1.13°E

The canton of Aixe-sur-Vienne is an administrative division of the Haute-Vienne department, western France. Its borders were not modified at the French canton reorganisation which came into effect in March 2015. Its seat is in Aixe-sur-Vienne.

It consists of the following communes:

1. Aixe-sur-Vienne
2. Beynac
3. Bosmie-l'Aiguille
4. Burgnac
5. Jourgnac
6. Saint-Martin-le-Vieux
7. Saint-Priest-sous-Aixe
8. Saint-Yrieix-sous-Aixe
9. Séreilhac
10. Verneuil-sur-Vienne
