= Verneuil-sur-Vienne =

- Commune
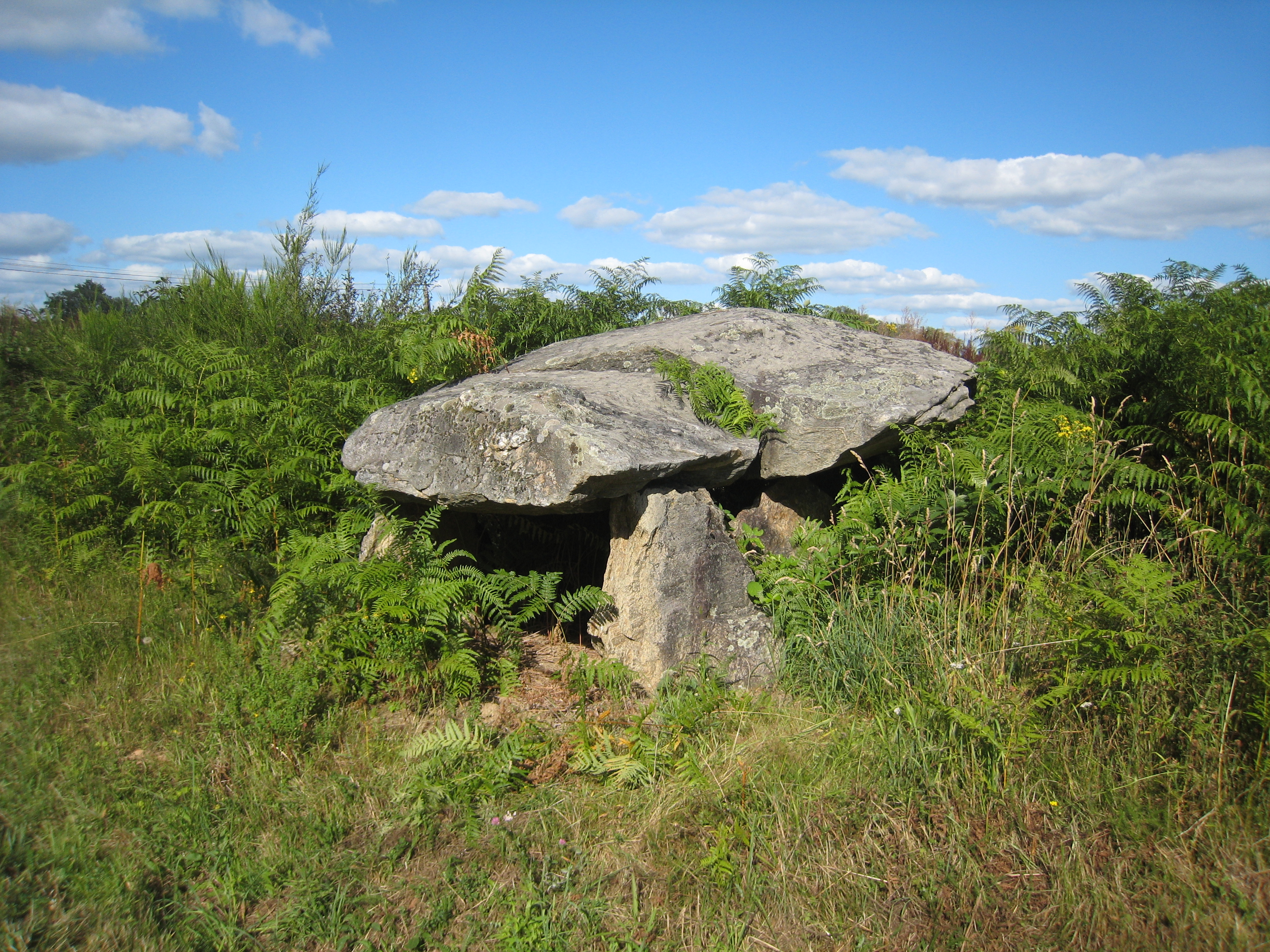
- The dolmen of Verneuil-sur-Vienne

- Coat of arms
- Location of Verneuil-sur-Vienne
- Location within France Location within Nouvelle-Aquitaine
- Coordinates: 45°50′58″N 1°07′39″E
- Country: France
- Region: Nouvelle-Aquitaine
- Department: Haute-Vienne
- Arrondissement: Limoges
- Canton: Aixe-sur-Vienne
- Intercommunality: CU Limoges Métropole

Government
  - Mayor (2020–2026): Pascal Robert
- Area^{1}: 34.52 km^{2} (13.33 sq mi)
- Highest elevation: 402 m (1,319 ft)
- Lowest elevation: 180 m (590 ft)
- Population (2023): 4,903
  - Density: 142.0/km^{2} (367.9/sq mi)
- Time zone: UTC+01:00 (CET)
  - Summer (DST): UTC+02:00 (CEST)
- INSEE/Postal code: 87201 /87430
- ^{1} French Land Register data, which excludes lakes, ponds, glaciers > 1 km^{2} (0.386 sq mi or 247 acres) and river estuaries.

Verneuil-sur-Vienne (French pronunciation: [vɛʁnœj syʁ vjɛn], literally Verneuil on Vienne; Occitan: Vernuèlh or Vernuelh) is a commune in the French department of Haute-Vienne and the region of Nouvelle-Aquitaine, western France. It is home of one of the last vineyards in Haute-Vienne.

== Population ==
Historical population
Year	Pop.	±% p.a.
1968	1,529	—
1975	1,749	+1.94%
1982	2,362	+4.39%
1990	2,968	+2.90%
1999	3,188	+0.80%
2007	3,864	+2.43%
2012	4,550	+3.32%
2017	4,889	+1.45%
2023	4,903	+0.05%
Source: INSEE

Inhabitants are known as Verneuillais in French.

== See also ==
- Communes of the Haute-Vienne department
