= Jourgnac =

- Commune
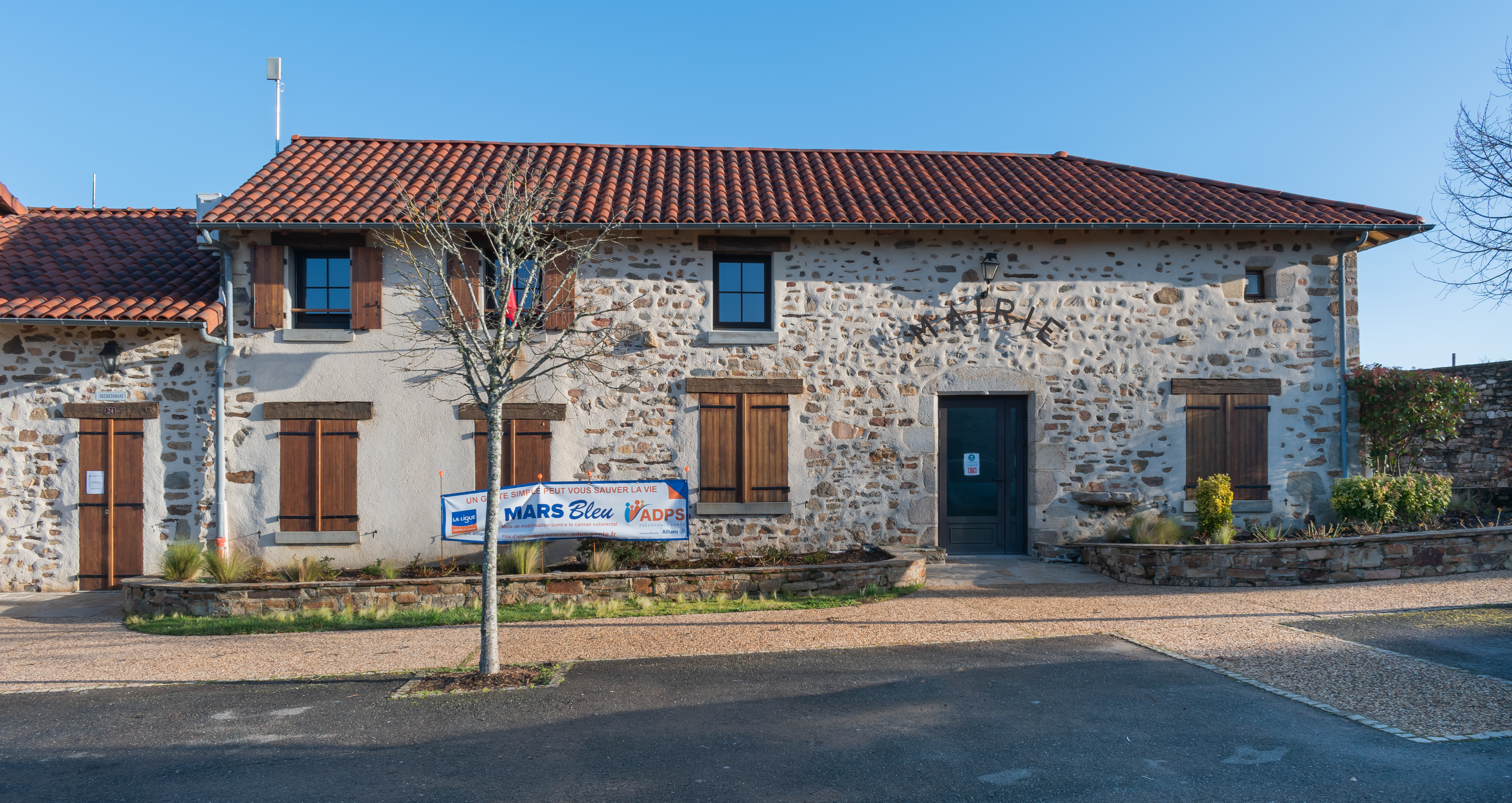
- Town hall of Jourgnac

- Coat of arms
- Location of Jourgnac
- Location within France Location within Nouvelle-Aquitaine
- Coordinates: 45°43′11″N 1°12′55″E
- Country: France
- Region: Nouvelle-Aquitaine
- Department: Haute-Vienne
- Arrondissement: Limoges
- Canton: Aixe-sur-Vienne
- Intercommunality: Val de Vienne

Government
  - Mayor (2020–2026): Francis Thomasson
- Area^{1}: 14.39 km^{2} (5.56 sq mi)
- Highest elevation: 404 m (1,325 ft)
- Lowest elevation: 209 m (686 ft)
- Population (2023): 1,109
  - Density: 77.07/km^{2} (199.6/sq mi)
- Time zone: UTC+01:00 (CET)
  - Summer (DST): UTC+02:00 (CEST)
- INSEE/Postal code: 87081 /87800
- ^{1} French Land Register data, which excludes lakes, ponds, glaciers > 1 km^{2} (0.386 sq mi or 247 acres) and river estuaries.

Jourgnac (French pronunciation: [ʒuʁɲak]; Occitan: Jurnhac) is a commune in the Haute-Vienne department in the Nouvelle-Aquitaine region in west-central France.

== Geography ==
The river Briance forms part of the commune's northern border.

Inhabitants are known as Jourgnacois.

== See also ==
- Communes of the Haute-Vienne department
