= Saint-Priest-sous-Aixe =

- Commune
- Location of Saint-Priest-sous-Aixe
- Location within France Location within Nouvelle-Aquitaine
- Coordinates: 45°49′05″N 1°06′03″E
- Country: France
- Region: Nouvelle-Aquitaine
- Department: Haute-Vienne
- Arrondissement: Limoges
- Canton: Aixe-sur-Vienne
- Intercommunality: Val de Vienne

Government
  - Mayor (2020–2026): Philippe Barry
- Area^{1}: 23.15 km^{2} (8.94 sq mi)
- Highest elevation: 383 m (1,257 ft)
- Lowest elevation: 180 m (590 ft)
- Population (2023): 1,743
  - Density: 75.29/km^{2} (195.0/sq mi)
- Time zone: UTC+01:00 (CET)
  - Summer (DST): UTC+02:00 (CEST)
- INSEE/Postal code: 87177 /87700
- ^{1} French Land Register data, which excludes lakes, ponds, glaciers > 1 km^{2} (0.386 sq mi or 247 acres) and river estuaries.

Saint-Priest-sous-Aixe (French pronunciation: [sɛ̃ pʁijɛ(st) su.z‿ɛks], literally Saint-Priest under Aixe; Occitan: Sent Prech d'Aissa) is a commune in the Haute-Vienne department in the Nouvelle-Aquitaine region in west-central France.

== See also ==
- Communes of the Haute-Vienne department
