= Javerdat =

- Commune
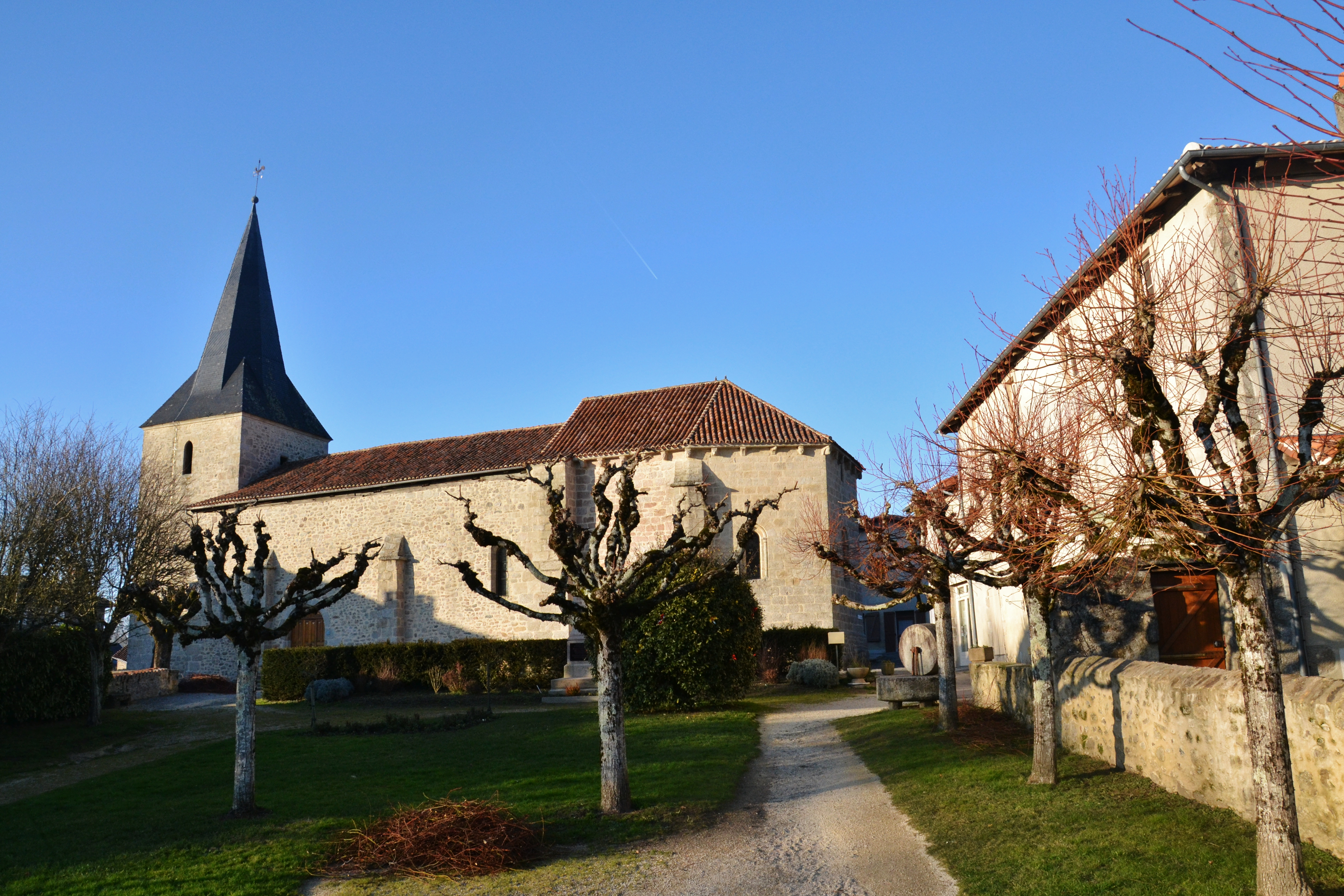
- The church and town hall in Javerdat

- Coat of arms
- Location of Javerdat
- Location within France Location within Nouvelle-Aquitaine
- Coordinates: 45°57′18″N 0°59′09″E
- Country: France
- Region: Nouvelle-Aquitaine
- Department: Haute-Vienne
- Arrondissement: Rochechouart
- Canton: Saint-Junien

Government
  - Mayor (2023–2026): Valérie Parpeix
- Area^{1}: 25.52 km^{2} (9.85 sq mi)
- Highest elevation: 336 m (1,102 ft)
- Lowest elevation: 228 m (748 ft)
- Population (2023): 733
  - Density: 28.7/km^{2} (74.4/sq mi)
- Time zone: UTC+01:00 (CET)
  - Summer (DST): UTC+02:00 (CEST)
- INSEE/Postal code: 87078 /87520
- ^{1} French Land Register data, which excludes lakes, ponds, glaciers > 1 km^{2} (0.386 sq mi or 247 acres) and river estuaries.

Javerdat (French pronunciation: [ʒavɛʁda]; Occitan: Javerdac) is a commune in the Haute-Vienne department in the Nouvelle-Aquitaine region in west-central France.

== See also ==
- Communes of the Haute-Vienne department
