= Saint-Brice-sur-Vienne =

- Commune
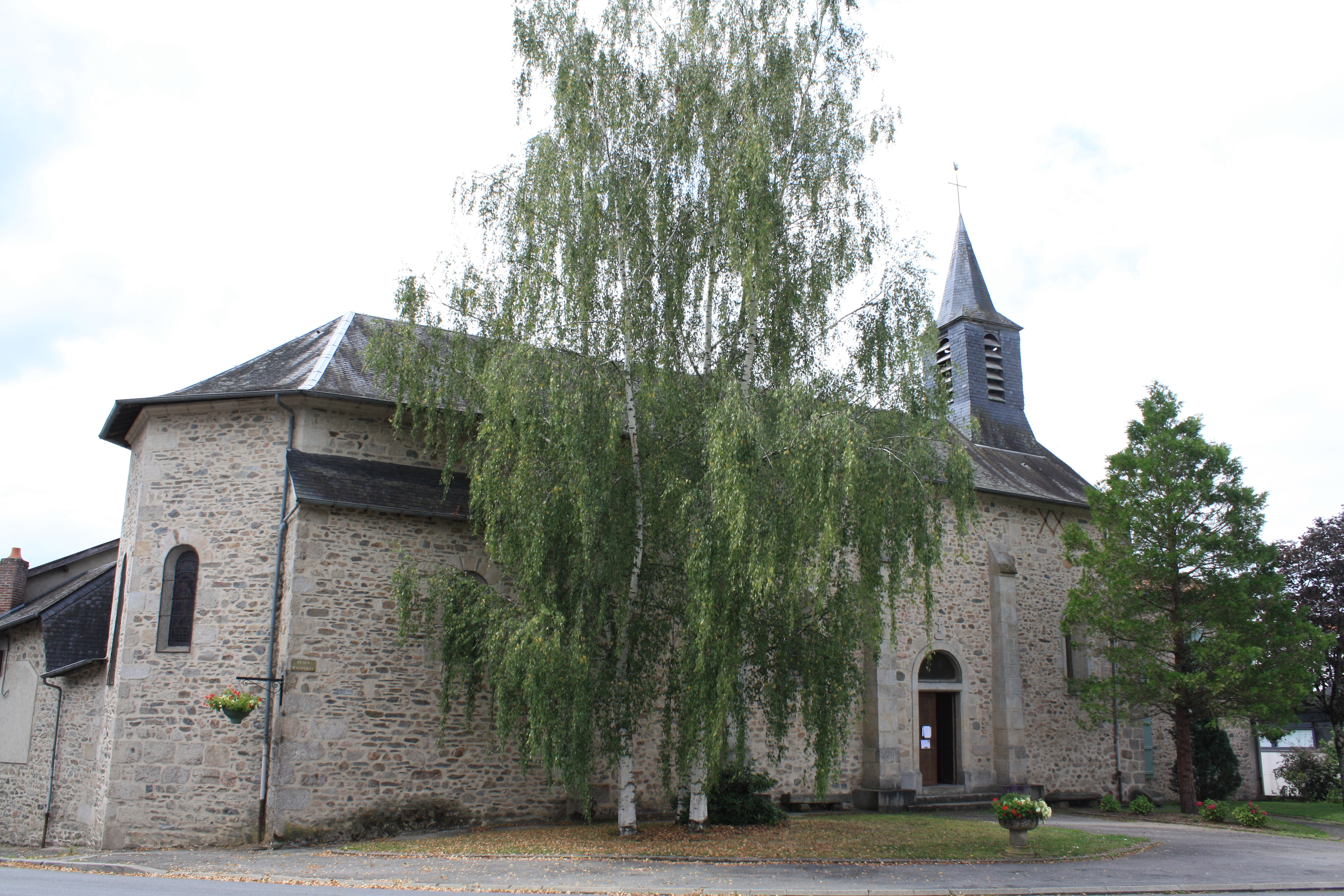
- The church in Saint-Brice-sur-Vienne

- Coat of arms
- Location of Saint-Brice-sur-Vienne
- Location within France Location within Nouvelle-Aquitaine
- Coordinates: 45°52′50″N 0°57′14″E
- Country: France
- Region: Nouvelle-Aquitaine
- Department: Haute-Vienne
- Arrondissement: Rochechouart
- Canton: Saint-Junien

Government
  - Mayor (2020–2026): Laëtitia Calendreau
- Area^{1}: 20.85 km^{2} (8.05 sq mi)
- Highest elevation: 298 m (978 ft)
- Lowest elevation: 165 m (541 ft)
- Population (2023): 1,656
  - Density: 79.42/km^{2} (205.7/sq mi)
- Time zone: UTC+01:00 (CET)
  - Summer (DST): UTC+02:00 (CEST)
- INSEE/Postal code: 87140 /87200
- ^{1} French Land Register data, which excludes lakes, ponds, glaciers > 1 km^{2} (0.386 sq mi or 247 acres) and river estuaries.

Saint-Brice-sur-Vienne (French pronunciation: [sɛ̃ bʁis syʁ vjɛn], literally Saint-Brice on Vienne; Occitan: Sent Brecís) is a commune in the Haute-Vienne department in the Nouvelle-Aquitaine region in west-central France.

Inhabitants are known as Saint-Briçois.

== See also ==
- Communes of the Haute-Vienne department
