= Chaillac-sur-Vienne =

- Commune
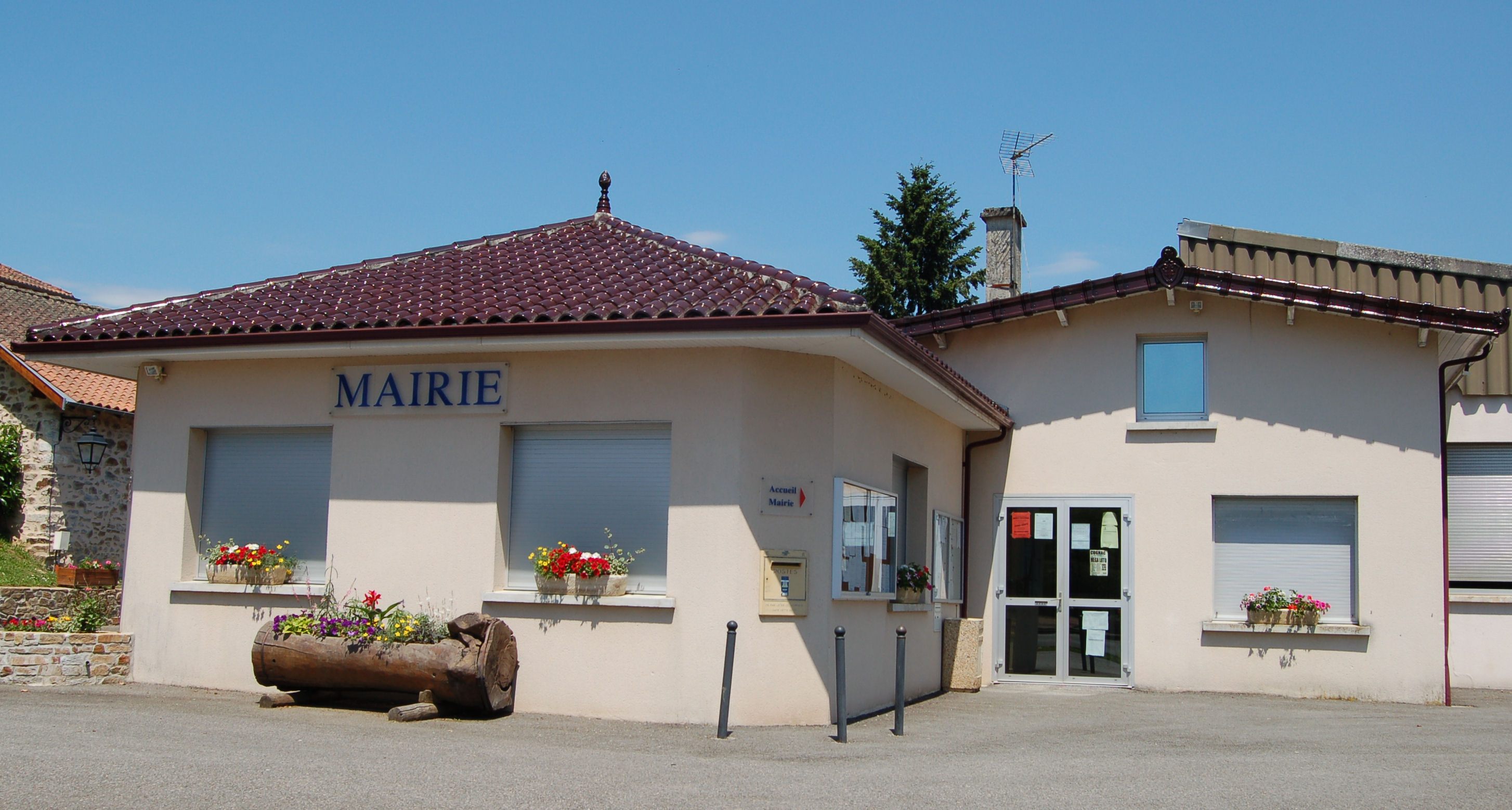
- The town hall in Chaillac-Sur-Vienne

- Coat of arms
- Location of Chaillac-sur-Vienne
- Location within France Location within Nouvelle-Aquitaine
- Coordinates: 45°52′48″N 0°52′24″E
- Country: France
- Region: Nouvelle-Aquitaine
- Department: Haute-Vienne
- Arrondissement: Rochechouart
- Canton: Saint-Junien

Government
  - Mayor (2020–2026): Jean-Pierre Granet
- Area^{1}: 15.14 km^{2} (5.85 sq mi)
- Highest elevation: 292 m (958 ft)
- Lowest elevation: 155 m (509 ft)
- Population (2023): 1,250
  - Density: 82.6/km^{2} (214/sq mi)
- Time zone: UTC+01:00 (CET)
  - Summer (DST): UTC+02:00 (CEST)
- INSEE/Postal code: 87030 /87200
- ^{1} French Land Register data, which excludes lakes, ponds, glaciers > 1 km^{2} (0.386 sq mi or 247 acres) and river estuaries.

Chaillac-sur-Vienne (French pronunciation: [ʃajak syʁ vjɛn], literally Chaillac on Vienne; Occitan: Chalhac) is a commune in the Haute-Vienne department in the Nouvelle-Aquitaine region in western France.

Inhabitants are known as Chaillacois.

== See also ==
- Rochechouart impact structure
- Communes of the Haute-Vienne department
