= Saillat-sur-Vienne =

- Commune
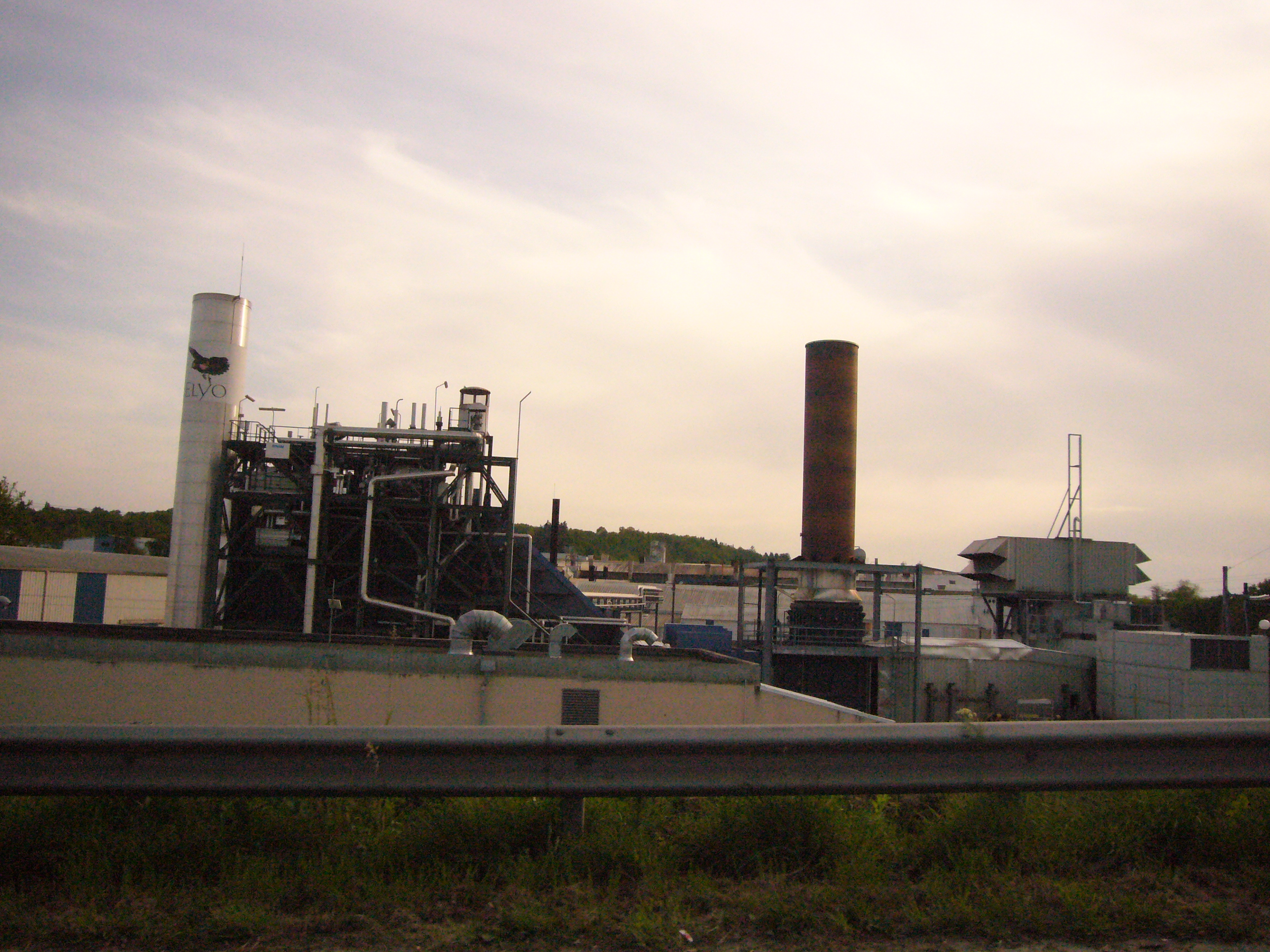
- The International Paper factory, in Saillat-sur-Vienne
- Location of Saillat-sur-Vienne
- Location within France Location within Nouvelle-Aquitaine
- Coordinates: 45°52′22″N 0°49′01″E
- Country: France
- Region: Nouvelle-Aquitaine
- Department: Haute-Vienne
- Arrondissement: Rochechouart
- Canton: Saint-Junien

Government
  - Mayor (2020–2026): Pascal Cluzeau
- Area^{1}: 6.29 km^{2} (2.43 sq mi)
- Highest elevation: 254 m (833 ft)
- Lowest elevation: 153 m (502 ft)
- Population (2023): 840
  - Density: 130/km^{2} (350/sq mi)
- Time zone: UTC+01:00 (CET)
  - Summer (DST): UTC+02:00 (CEST)
- INSEE/Postal code: 87131 /87720
- ^{1} French Land Register data, which excludes lakes, ponds, glaciers > 1 km^{2} (0.386 sq mi or 247 acres) and river estuaries.

Saillat-sur-Vienne (French: [saja syʁ vjɛn], literally Saillat on Vienne; Occitan: Salhac [saˈʎak, -ˈjak], locally [ʃɔˈjak]) is a commune in the Haute-Vienne department in the Nouvelle-Aquitaine region in west-central France. Because of the town's name's native pronunciation, Saillat was formerly known as Chaillac.

Inhabitants are known as Saillatais.

== See also ==
- Communes of the Haute-Vienne department
