= Junian of Saint-Junien =

Saint Junian
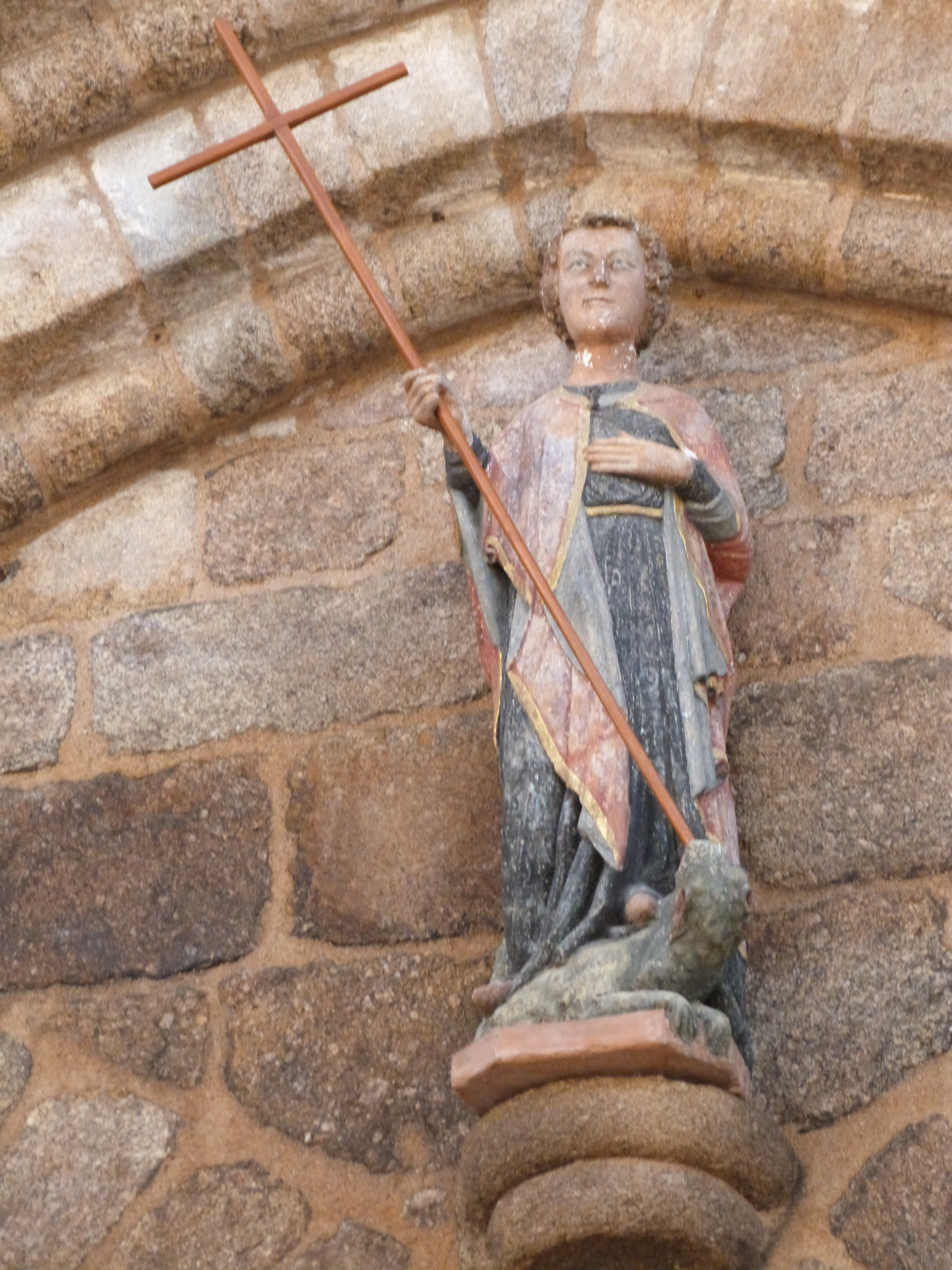
- Born: 486 AD; France
- Died: France
- Venerated in: Roman Catholic Church
- Feast: 16 October

Saint Junian (French: Saint Junien) was a 5th-century Christian hermit at the location later named after him, Saint-Junien. According to tradition, he was the son of the Count of Cambrai and was born in 486, during the reign of Clovis I. This tradition states that Junian and Saint Leonard were baptized at the same time.

At the age of 15, Junian journeyed to the Limousin, a region that had a reputation for austerity and also for the many saints and hermits who had resided there. One of these saints was a certain Amand, and Junian wished to become his disciple. Amand lived in a small hermitage at the confluence of the Vienne and Clain Rivers, at a place called Comodoliac, which had been offered to him by Ruricius, bishop of Limoges.

According to tradition, is said that, very late at night, Junian knocked on the door of Amand, who did not answer, fearing that it was a demon. Junian had to sleep outside during a violent snowstorm, but the snow miraculously fell around rather than on him during the night.

Junian trained with Amand, and after the passing of his master, Junian lived where the collegiate church stands nowadays.
