= Saint-Junien =

Saint-Junien Sent Junian (Occitan)
- Commune
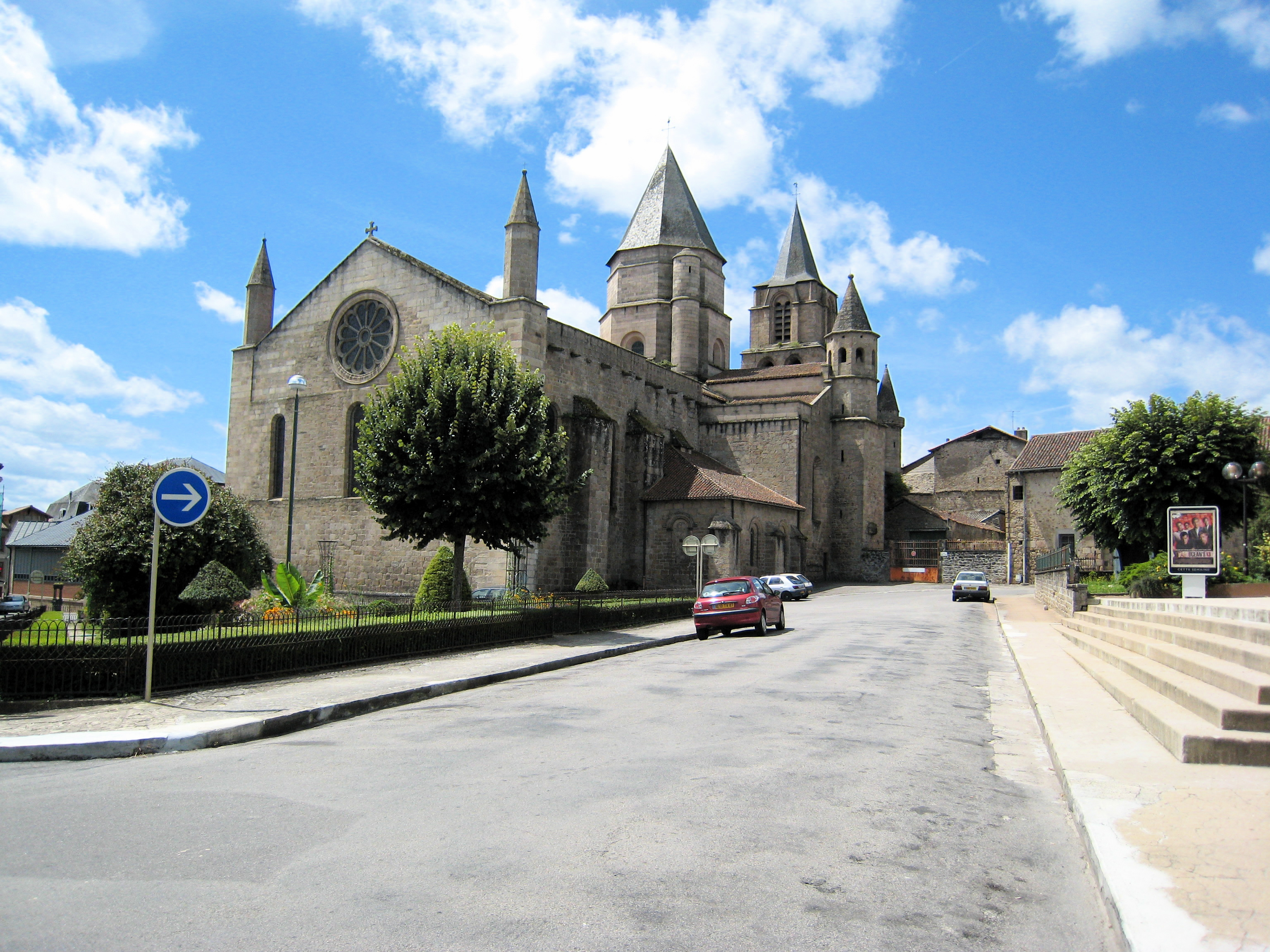
- Collegiate church

- Coat of arms
- Location of Saint-Junien
- Location within France Location within Nouvelle-Aquitaine
- Coordinates: 45°53′17″N 0°54′07″E
- Country: France
- Region: Nouvelle-Aquitaine
- Department: Haute-Vienne
- Arrondissement: Rochechouart
- Canton: Saint-Junien

Government
  - Mayor (2024–2026): Hervé Beaudet
- Area^{1}: 56.82 km^{2} (21.94 sq mi)
- Highest elevation: 317 m (1,040 ft)
- Lowest elevation: 157 m (515 ft)
- Population (2023): 11,415
  - Density: 200.9/km^{2} (520.3/sq mi)
- Time zone: UTC+01:00 (CET)
  - Summer (DST): UTC+02:00 (CEST)
- INSEE/Postal code: 87154 /87200
- ^{1} French Land Register data, which excludes lakes, ponds, glaciers > 1 km^{2} (0.386 sq mi or 247 acres) and river estuaries.

Saint-Junien (French pronunciation: [sɛ̃ ʒynjɛ̃]; Occitan: Sent Junian) is a commune in the Haute-Vienne department in the Nouvelle-Aquitaine region in west-central France. Its sister city is Jumet, Belgium.

== History ==
The history of Saint-Junien began in AD 500, when an ascetic of Hungarian origin, Saint Amand, chose to live on the north bank of the Vienne River at a place called Comodoliac.

Ruricius, bishop of Limoges, offered him a humble cell. At this time, Junian (Junien), originally from the north of France and son of a Count of Cambrai, left his family at the age of 15 and became a disciple of Saint Amand. It is said that Junian knocked on the door of Amand, who did not answer. Junian had to sleep outside, and the snow miraculously spared him during the night. He then lived as a hermit and, after the passing of his master, he lived where the collegiate church stands nowadays.

In 593, Gregory of Tours was impressed by the importance of the pilgrimage to the saint's tomb. An urban area was quickly created around the abbey built in honor of the saint. However, this monastery was destroyed by the Vikings in 866. By the end of the 13th century, high walls were built around the city.

Saint-Junien is a city of strong communist tradition, marked by the municipality of Roland Mazoin, (mayor from 1965 to 2001), now headed by Pierre Allard, member of the Alternative Democracy Socialism (locally implanted party born of a split with the PCF). This peculiarity is largely inherited from the importance of the industrial sector of glove making, especially in the nineteenth and twentieth centuries, like Limoges.

== Demographics ==
Inhabitants are known as Saint-Juniauds.

Historical population
Year	Pop.	±% p.a.
1968	11,298	—
1975	11,271	−0.03%
1982	10,805	−0.60%
1990	10,604	−0.23%
1999	10,666	+0.06%
2007	11,695	+1.16%
2012	11,373	−0.56%
2017	11,202	−0.30%
2023	11,415	+0.31%
Source: INSEE

== Prominent locals ==
- Jean-Baptiste-Camille Corot, July 16, 1796 – February 22, 1875) was a French landscape and portrait painter as well as a printmaker in etching. He is a pivotal figure in landscape painting and his vast output simultaneously references the Neo-Classical tradition and anticipates the plein-air innovations of Impressionism.
- Robert Hébras (1925–2023), member of the Resistance, survivor of the SS massacre at Oradour-sur-Glane.
- Maurice Arreckx (1917–2001), politician.
- Sophie Vouzelaud, first dauphine of Miss France 2007.

== Curiosity ==
- At the 2017 inauguration ceremony for American president Donald Trump's first term in office, his wife Melania Trump wore gloves specially made for the occasion by the Agnelle company, based in Saint-Junien.

== Climate ==
Climate data for Saint-Junien (1996–2020 normals, extremes 1996–present)
Month	Jan	Feb	Mar	Apr	May	Jun	Jul	Aug	Sep	Oct	Nov	Dec	Year
Record high °C (°F)	18.5 (65.3)	24.2 (75.6)	25.9 (78.6)	29.8 (85.6)	31.2 (88.2)	38.0 (100.4)	39.5 (103.1)	39.7 (103.5)	35.6 (96.1)	30.9 (87.6)	23.9 (75.0)	18.3 (64.9)	39.7 (103.5)
Mean daily maximum °C (°F)	8.2 (46.8)	9.5 (49.1)	13.3 (55.9)	16.3 (61.3)	19.6 (67.3)	23.5 (74.3)	25.4 (77.7)	25.6 (78.1)	22.2 (72.0)	17.6 (63.7)	11.8 (53.2)	8.9 (48.0)	16.8 (62.2)
Daily mean °C (°F)	5.0 (41.0)	5.4 (41.7)	8.4 (47.1)	11.0 (51.8)	14.3 (57.7)	17.9 (64.2)	19.5 (67.1)	19.5 (67.1)	16.3 (61.3)	13.0 (55.4)	8.1 (46.6)	5.6 (42.1)	12.0 (53.6)
Mean daily minimum °C (°F)	1.8 (35.2)	1.4 (34.5)	3.6 (38.5)	5.7 (42.3)	9.0 (48.2)	12.4 (54.3)	13.7 (56.7)	13.3 (55.9)	10.3 (50.5)	8.4 (47.1)	4.4 (39.9)	2.2 (36.0)	7.2 (45.0)
Record low °C (°F)	−10.5 (13.1)	−13.6 (7.5)	−11.8 (10.8)	−5.3 (22.5)	−1.1 (30.0)	3.5 (38.3)	5.4 (41.7)	5.2 (41.4)	1.1 (34.0)	−4.7 (23.5)	−9.4 (15.1)	−11.7 (10.9)	−13.6 (7.5)
Average precipitation mm (inches)	87.9 (3.46)	72.6 (2.86)	77.9 (3.07)	84.9 (3.34)	89.3 (3.52)	71.9 (2.83)	57.7 (2.27)	67.7 (2.67)	61.8 (2.43)	82.7 (3.26)	100.4 (3.95)	102.3 (4.03)	957.1 (37.68)
Average precipitation days (≥ 1.0 mm)	13.3	11.5	11.5	11.8	11.2	9.2	8.2	8.9	8.4	11.4	14.2	13.3	132.8
Source: Meteociel

== See also ==
- Communes of the Haute-Vienne department
