= Aixe-sur-Vienne =

Aixe-sur-Vienne Aissa (Occitan)
- Commune
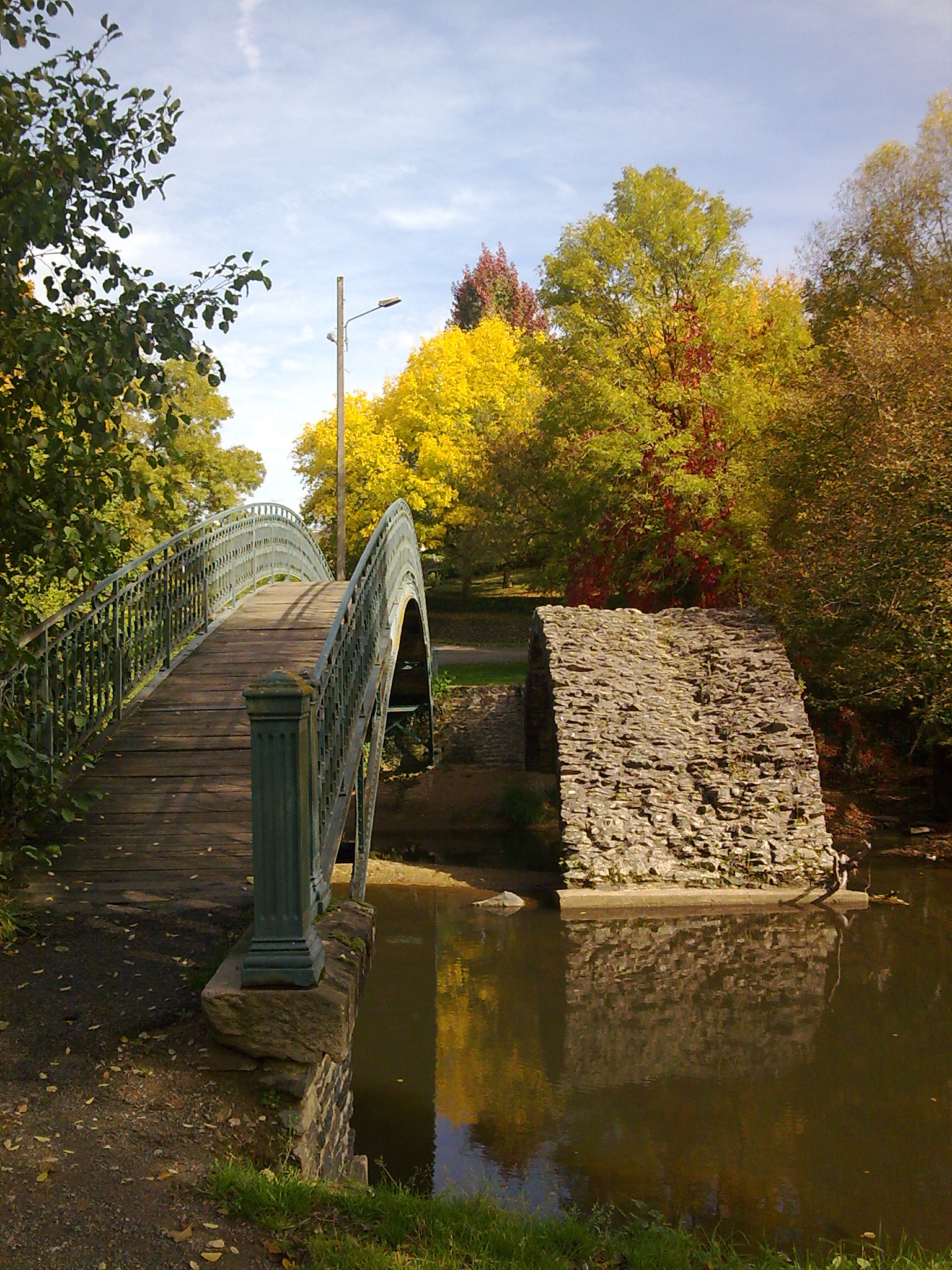
- The vestige of the Malassert bridge, built in the 14th century, and called "Roman Bridge"

- Coat of arms
- Location of Aixe-sur-Vienne
- Location within France Location within Nouvelle-Aquitaine
- Coordinates: 45°47′50″N 1°08′12″E
- Country: France
- Region: Nouvelle-Aquitaine
- Department: Haute-Vienne
- Arrondissement: Limoges
- Canton: Aixe-sur-Vienne
- Intercommunality: Val de Vienne

Government
  - Mayor (2020–2026): René Arnaud
- Area^{1}: 22.85 km^{2} (8.82 sq mi)
- Highest elevation: 343 m (1,125 ft)
- Lowest elevation: 190 m (620 ft)
- Population (2023): 5,890
  - Density: 258/km^{2} (668/sq mi)
- Time zone: UTC+01:00 (CET)
  - Summer (DST): UTC+02:00 (CEST)
- INSEE/Postal code: 87001 /87700
- ^{1} French Land Register data, which excludes lakes, ponds, glaciers > 1 km^{2} (0.386 sq mi or 247 acres) and river estuaries.

Aixe-sur-Vienne (French: [ɛks syʁ vjɛn]; Occitan: Aissa) is a commune in the Haute-Vienne department in the Nouvelle-Aquitaine region in western France.

== History ==
A merovingian castrum was recorded as being at the confluence of the river. The Château d'Aixe (or "Tour Jeanne d'Albret") was constructed in the 13th century in Aixe-sur-Vienne, controlled by the viscounts of Limoges. It was demolished at the beginning of the 19th century.

== Population ==
Historical population
Year	Pop.	±% p.a.
1968	4,065	—
1975	4,819	+2.46%
1982	5,520	+1.96%
1990	5,566	+0.10%
1999	5,466	−0.20%
2007	5,532	+0.15%
2012	5,602	+0.25%
2017	5,836	+0.82%
2023	5,890	+0.15%
Source: INSEE

== See also ==
- Communes of the Haute-Vienne department
