= Timeline of the liberation of France =

Aspect of French history

Timeline of the liberation of the primary cities of France between 1943 and 1945.

Date	City	Town	Dép. No.	Region (Note: Regional government did not exist in 1944-1945)	Liberating army/units	Notes
1943-09-09	Ajaccio	2A	Corsica		(Operation Vesuvius) Liberation of Corsica	
1943-09-10	Sartène	2A	Corsica		Liberation of Corsica	
1943-09-23	Porto-Vecchio	2A	Corsica		Liberation of Corsica	
1943-10-04	Bastia	2B	Corsica	French, 73rd Moroccan Goumiers of the 6th Tabor	Liberation of Corsica	
1944-06-06	D-Day landings (Allied invasion of Europe as part of Operation Overlord)					
1944-06-06	Normandy coast	14	Normandy	21st Army Group	Normandy Landings (start of Operation Overlord)	
1944-06-06	Ranville	14	Normandy	6th Airlanding Brigade	Capture of the Caen canal and Orne river bridges	
1944-06-07	Bayeux	14	Normandy			
1944-06-07	Guéret	23	Nouvelle-Aquitaine			
1944-06-08	Tulle	19	Nouvelle-Aquitaine		Initial liberation by Francs-tireurs followed by same day by recapture by 2nd SS Panzer Division Das Reich and reprisals including 99 killed in Tulle massacre	
1944-06-12	Carentan	50	Normandy	American: 101st Airborne Division	Battle of Carentan (1944-06-06 to 13)	
1944-06-14	Marèges Dam	15; 19	Auvergne-Rhône-Alpes; Limousin	Maquis du Limousin		
1944-07-01	Cherbourg	50	Normandy	American	Battle of Cherbourg	
1944-07-18	Saint-Lô	50	Normandy	American XIX Corps	Battle of Saint-Lô (July 7–19)	
1944-06-06 – 1944-08-06	Caen	14	Normandy	British, Canadian Second Army	Battle for Caen	
1944-07-28	Coutances	50	Normandy			
1944-07-30	Granville	50	Normandy			
1944-07-31	Avranches	50	Normandy			
1944-08-04	Rennes	35	Brittany			
1944-08-04	Châteaubriant	44	Pays de la Loire	American		
1944-08-05	Ancenis	44	Pays de la Loire			
1944-08-04 to 6	Vannes	56	Brittany			
1944-08-06	Mayenne	53	Pays de la Loire			
1944-08-08	Le Mans	72	Pays de la Loire			
1944-08-08	Quimper	29	Brittany	German departure		
1944-08-08	Vire	14	Normandy	American, 29th Infantry Division (United States)		
1944-08-10	Angers	49	Pays de la Loire	American		
1944-08-12	Alençon	61	Normandy	French, 2nd Armored Division (France)	Falaise Pocket	
1944-08-12	Nantes	44	Pays de la Loire	American: Patton		
1944-08-12	Privas	07	Auvergne-Rhône-Alpes			
1944-08-15	Operation Dragoon landings in southern France					
1944-08-15	Brive-la-Gaillarde	19	Nouvelle-Aquitaine	Maquis du Limousin		
1944-08-16	Orléans	45	Centre-Val de Loire	American: Patton		
1944-08-16	Tulle	19	Nouvelle-Aquitaine	Maquis du Limousin	Brigade Jesser; Tulle massacre	
1944-08-17	Ussel	19	Nouvelle-Aquitaine	Maquis du Limousin	retaken same day by Jesser forces •Brigade Jesser	
1944-08-17	Saint-Malo	35	Brittany	Battle of Saint-Malo		
1944-08-17	Tarbes	6	Occitanie			
1944-08-17	Cahors	46	Nouvelle Aquitaine			
1944-08-18	Chartres	28	Centre-Val de Loire	American: 3rd US Army: Patton: 5th Infantry Division (United States); 7th Armored Division (United States)		
1944-08-18	Rambouillet	78	Île-de-France	American 3rd US Army: Patton: 7th Armored Division (United States); 3rd Cavalry Regiment (United States)		
1944-08-18	Blois	41	Centre-Val de Loire			
1944-08-18	Perpignan	66	Occitanie			
1944-08-19	Carcassonne	11	Occitanie	German departure		
1944-08-19	Périgueux	24	Nouvelle-Aquitaine	German departure	Bordeaux	
1944-08-19	Agen	47	Nouvelle-Aquitaine	German departure	Bordeaux	
1944-08-19	Montauban	82	Occitanie	German departure		
1944-08-19	Lourdes	65	Occitanie	Occitanie		
1944-08-19	Toulouse	31	Occitanie	German departure	Toulouse libérée (Toulouse liberated): documentary on the liberation of Toulouse.	
1944-08-19	Foix	09	Occitanie	Spanish maquis, commanded by Marcel Bigeard		
1944-08-19	Auch	32	Occitanie	Occitanie		
1944-08-19	Mantes-la-Jolie	78	le-de-France	American: Patton		
1944-08-19	Digne	04	Provence-Alpes-Côte d'Azur			
1944-08-19	Annecy	74	Auvergne-Rhône-Alpes	La Résistance		
1944-08-19	Saint-Étienne	42	Auvergne-Rhône-Alpes	German departure		
1944-08-19	Le Puy-en-Velay	43	Auvergne-Rhône-Alpes			
1944-08-20	Pau	64	Nouvelle-Aquitaine			
1944-08-20	Albi	81	Occitanie			
1944-08-21	Sens	89	Bourgogne-Franche-Comté	American: General Patton		
1944-08-21	Castres; Mazamet	81	Occitanie	Résistance du Tarn		
1944-08-21	Château-Landon	77	Île-de-France	American: Patton		
1944-08-21	Limoges	87	Nouvelle-Aquitaine	Maquis of colonel Georges Guingouin		
1944-08-21	Mende	48	Occitanie			
1944-08-21	Roanne	42	Auvergne-Rhône-Alpes			
1944-08-21	Ussel	19	Nouvelle-Aquitaine	Departure of the Jesser brigade; maquis du Limousin takes over		
1944-08-22	Corrèze	19	Nouvelle-Aquitaine	maquis du Limousin		
1944-08-22	Millau	12	Occitanie	German departure		
1944-08-22	Grenoble	38	Auvergne-Rhône-Alpes		see Grenoble's Saint-Bartholomew	
1944-08-22	Gap	05	Provence-Alpes-Côte d'Azur			
1944-08-22	Toulon	83	Provence-Alpes-Côte d'Azur	American: 7th Army VI Corps (United States) and French Army B		
1944-08-22	Chambéry	73	Auvergne-Rhône-Alpes			
1944-08-22	Nemours, Fontainebleau, Fontaine-le-Port	77	Île-de-France	American		
1944-08-23	Gap	05	Provence-Alpes-Côte d'Azur	Limousin maquis	First liberation of Guéret	
1944-08-23 to 28	Marseille	13	Provence-Alpes-Côte d'Azur	French: Joseph de Goislard de Monsabert	Battle of Marseille	
1944-08-24	Cosne-Cours-sur-Loire	58	Bourgogne-Franche-Comté	German departure		
1944-08-24	Dax	40	Nouvelle-Aquitaine			
1944-08-24	Saint-Flour	15	Auvergne-Rhône-Alpes			
1944-08-24	Melun; Montigny-sur-Loing; Nandy	77	Île-de-France	American		
1944-08-24 to 25	Paris	75	Île-de-France	French: 2nd DB, US 4th Infantry Division	; German departure; see also Liberation of Paris	
1944-08-25	Trappes; Saint-Cyr-l'École; Versailles	78	Centre-Val-de-Loire	French: 2nd DB		
1944-08-25	Vernon	27	Normandy			
1944-08-25	Guéret	23	Nouvelle-Aquitaine	Final liberation of Guéret by the Maquis du Limousin	liberation of Guéret, Maquis du Limousin	
1944-08-25	Vulaines-sur-Seine; Samois-sur-Seine; Montereau; Salins	77	Île-de-France	American		
1944-08-25	Avignon	84	Provence-Alpes-Côte d'Azur			
1944-08-25 to 26	Troyes	10	Grand Est	American		
1944-08-26	Évry-les-Châteaux; Coubert; Tournan-en-Brie; Chaumes; Nangis	77	Île-de-France	American		
1944-08-26	Vichy	03	Auvergne-Rhône-Alpes	German departure		
1944-08-27	Clermont-Ferrand	63	Auvergne-Rhône-Alpes			
1944-08-27	Coulommiers; Lagny; Crécy-en-Brie; Meaux; Beton-Bazoches; Provins	77	Île-de-France	American: Patton		
1944-08-28	Les Sables-d'Olonne	85	Pays de la Loire	German departure		
1944-08-28	Épernay; Mareuil-sur-Ay	51	Grand Est	American		
1944-08-28	Nice	06	Provence-Alpes-Côte d'Azur		See also Liberation of Nice	
1944-08-28	Annet-sur-Marne; La Ferté-sous-Jouarre; Vaires-sur-Marne	77	Île-de-France	American		
1944-08-28	Bordeaux	33	Nouvelle-Aquitaine	German departure		
1944-08-29	Niort	79	Nouvelle-Aquitaine			
1944-08-30	Rouen	76	Normandy	Canadian		
1944-08-30	Beauvais	60	Hauts-de-France	British		
1944-08-30	Laon	02	Hauts-de-France			
1944-08-30	Uzès	30	Occitanie			
1944-08-21 to 30	Montélimar	26	Auvergne-Rhône-Alpes			
1944-08-30	Reims	51	Grand Est			
1944-08-30	Saint-Dizier	52	Grand Est	American: general Patton		
1944-08-31	Amiens	80	Hauts-de-France	British 2nd Army: general Dempsey		
1944-08-31	Charleville-Mézières	08	Grand Est			
1944-08-31	Verdun	55	Grand Est			
1944-09-01	Cézembre	35	Brittany		Liberation of Saint-Malo	
1944-09-01	Tours	37	Centre-Val-de-Loire	Maillé massacre		
1944-09-01	Angoulême	16	Nouvelle-Aquitaine			
1944-09-01	Le Pouzin	07	Auvergne-Rhône-Alpes		History of Pouzin in the Second World War	
1944-09-01	Dieppe	76	Normandy	Canadian, Fusiliers Mont-Royal, Royal Regiment of Canada	See also: Dieppe Raid (Operation Jubilee, 19 August 1942)	
1944-09-02	Loches	37	Centre-Val de Loire			
1944-09-02	Valenciennes	59	Hauts-de-France	American		
1944-09-02	Montpellier	34	Occitanie	French: général de Lattre		
1944-09-03	Arras	62	Hauts-de-France	British Second Army		
1944-09-03	Lille	59	Hauts-de-France	British Second Army		
1944-09-03	Lyon	69	Auvergne-Rhône-Alpes		see also 1st Army (France)	
1944-09-04	Montreuil	62	Hauts-de-France	Canadian: General Crerar		
1944-09-04	Bourg-en-Bresse	01	Auvergne-Rhône-Alpes			
1944-09-04	Mâcon	71	Bourgogne-Franche-Comté			
1944-09-04	Vierzon	18	Centre-Val de Loire			
1944-09-05	Saint-Omer	62	Hauts-de-France	Polish		
1944-09-05	Poitiers	86	Nouvelle-Aquitaine		see also Poiters during the Second World War	
1944-09-05	Chalon-sur-Saône	71	Bourgogne-Franche-Comté			
1944-09-06	Moulins	03	Auvergne-Rhône-Alpes			
1944-09-07	Besançon	25	Bourgogne-Franche-Comté			
1944-09-07	Briançon	05	Provence-Alpes-Côte d'Azur			
1944-09-09	Dole	39	Bourgogne-Franche-Comté			
1944-09-09	Nevers	58	Bourgogne-Franche-Comté			
1944-09-09	Autun	71	Bourgogne-Franche-Comté			
1944-09-10	Issoudun	36	Centre-Val de Loire	Surrender of the Elster column à la sous-préfecture	; See also Elster column	
1944-09-11	Dijon	21	Bourgogne-Franche-Comté			
1944-09-12	Le Havre	76	Normandy	I Corps	Operation Astonia	
1944-09-12	Andelot-Blancheville	52	Grand Est	American		
1944-09-12	Nod-sur-Seine	21	Bourgogne-Franche-Comté	Junction of the armored forces of the 2nd Armored Division (France) of General Leclerc with that of the 1st Armored Division (France) under General de Lattre de Tassigny		
1944-09-12	Vesoul	70	Bourgogne-Franche-Comté			
1944-09-13	Chaumont	52	Grand Est	Germans evacuated in the night of September 12 to September 13. 2nd Armored Division (France) entered the town		
1944-09-16	Beaugency	45	Centre-Val de Loire		; see also Surrender of the Elster column	
1944-08-08 – 1944-09-18	Brest	29	Bretagne		Battle for Brest (7 August – 19 September 1944)	
1944-09-19	Boulogne-sur-Mer	62	Hauts-de-France			
1944-09-19	Nancy	54	Grand Est		Battle of Nancy (1944)	
1944-09-24	Épinal	88	Grand Est		*: see also Battle of Vosges	
1944-09-30	Calais	62	Hauts-de-France	First Canadian Army	Operation Undergo	
1944-11-20	Belfort	90	Bourgogne-Franche-Comté			
1944-11-21	Mulhouse	68	Grand Est	I^{re} DB of general Jean Touzet du Vigier.		
1944-11-22	Metz	57	Grand Est	US Third Army	Battle of Metz	
1944-11-23	Strasbourg	67	Grand Est	French, 2e DB	History of Strasbourg	
1944-11-27	Villé	67	Grand Est	American	Villé	
1944-12-04	Carling; Guebenhouse; Loupershouse; Puttelange-aux-Lacs	57	Grand Est	US Third Army	Carling, Guebenhouse: Loupershouse; Puttelange-aux-Lacs	
1944-12-06	Sarreguemines	57	Grand Est	American		
1945-02-02	Colmar	68	Grand Est	French and American	Colmar Pocket	
1945-02-04	Turckheim	68	Grand Est		Colmar Pocket	
1945-03-14	Forbach	57	Grand Est	French and American		
1945-03-16	Bitche	57	Grand Est	American	Liberation of Bitche	
1945-03-16	Haguenau	67	Grand Est	américaine		
1945-03-19	Wissembourg	67	Grand Est	American: General Alexander Patch		
1945-03-19	Lauterbourg	67	Grand Est	French		
1945-04-18	Royan	17	Nouvelle-Aquitaine			
1945-04-24	Saorge	06	Provence-Alpes-Côte d'Azur			
1945-04-30	Oléron	17	Nouvelle-Aquitaine			
1945-05-08	End of World War II in Europe (Germany surrenders; Victory in Europe Day)					
1945-05-08	La Rochelle	17	Nouvelle-Aquitaine	History of La Rochelle		
1945-05-09	Dunkirk	59	Hauts-de-France		isolated by Siege of Dunkirk (1944–45)	
1945-05-09	Île de Ré	17	Nouvelle-Aquitaine			
1945-05-10	Lorient; Belle-Île-en-Mer; Île de Groix; Quiberon Peninsula	56	Bretagne		Lorient pocket	
1945-05-11	Saint-Nazaire; Bouvron	44	Pays de la Loire		Bypassed and isolated as Saint-Nazaire pocket	
