= Georges Guingouin =

French Communist Party (PCF) militant

- Born: 2 February 1913; Magnac-Laval
- Died: 27 October 2005; Troyes
- Occupations: Teacher, local politician
- Awards: Commander of the Legion of Honour (2005)

Georges Guingouin (2 February 1913, Magnac-Laval in Haute-Vienne, France – 27 October 2005, Troyes, France) was a French Communist Party (PCF) militant who played a leading role in the French resistance as head of the Maquis du Limousin. He was controversial as a result of extortion committed under his authority during the épuration sauvage in Limousin during 1944.

== Youth ==
Guingouin's father, a career non-commissioned officer, was killed at Bapaume in 1914. His mother was the daughter of a ceramics worker; she was the headmistress of a primary school. Guingouin was initially a pupil at the école primaire supérieure at Bellac, and was then admitted to the école normale d'instituteurs teacher training school at Limoges. After his military service, he was appointed as a teacher at Saint-Gilles-les-Forêts in 1935.

"Comme beaucoup d’autres, ce jeune instituteur est très préoccupé par l’engagement politique". Guingouin belonged to the communist party, becoming secretary of the Eymoutiers section which encompassed five rural cantons. He wrote articles about foreign politics in the party weekly, Le Travailleur du Centre. The historian Max Lagarrigue observed that rural communism was in a vigorous state at that time, thanks to the country leaders of the PCF, Renaud Jean and Marius Vazeilles, and that it made a good showing in the 1936 vote, with many rural candidates elected. Lagarrigue adds that Guingouin, as leader of the campaign in Haute-Vienne, earned himself the nomination to the federal committee, then to the regional office of the PCF.

== Prefect of the maquis ==
Guingouin was mobilised in the rank of second class in 1939. He sustained an eyebrow injury on 18 June 1940, and was cared for in the Moulins military hospital in Allier, which he left voluntarily in order to avoid being taken prisoner. On returning to Saint-Gilles-les-Forêts, he secretly went back to his activities as a communist fighter, and wrote in 1940 a "call to the struggle". In September 1940, recalled from his teaching functions, he got back in contact with the underground communist party machinery and became federal secretary of Haute-Vienne. However, he decided not to circulate the 9th issue of the "Life of the party" communist party bulletin, which declared "We must be without hate towards the German soldiers. We are against de Gaulle and the capitalist clan whose interests are linked to Vichy

In January 1941 Guingouin published the first issue of the Travailleur limousin (Limousin worker) underground journal. He later wrote that he held off from attacking de Gaulle or the United Kingdom, breaking with the official party line. In April 1941 he joined the maquis, which astonished Gabriel Roucaute, one of the party leadership's representatives in the zone libre. During the night of 30 September to 1 October, Guingouin organised the first armed requisitioning of ration cards, which would earn him a forced labour sentence in absentia at the hands of a military court in January 1942.

He named his first armed groups "Francs Tireurs", at a time when the Francs-Tireurs et Partisans had not yet been created. In March 1942, when the communists joined the armed struggle in earnest, Roucaute ordered him to stop his operations. Guingouin refused, and relations with the party became strained. After this, he joined with the FTPF.

Nicknamed Lo Grand (the Great) by the locals, Guingouin organised his first maquis, notably in Châteauneuf-la-Forêt. Certain types of operations under his command led to him being titled "prefect" of the maquis: in December 1942, he attempted to put a stop to hay and wheat requisitioning by blowing up the baler at Eymoutiers. He formed a fixed unit, the 1st Brigade de Marche Limousine, and mobile "flying" units with varying effectiveness.

In February 1943, he carried out a solo operation to break into a German ammunition warehouse disguised as a woman to hide his identity.

Guingouin's unit sabotaged and destroyed the Bussy-Varache viaduct on the Limoges-Ussel on 13 March 1943; the viaduct was not reconstructed until after the war. On the night of May 9, 1943, at the request of the English, Guingouin personally led a commando which sabotaged the boilers at the rubber factory in le Palais-sur-Vienne near Limoges, thereby halting the production of France's second largest rubber factory for five months. While returning, the commando narrowly missed an ambush by the police. On 14 July 1943, the subterranean cable linking the Bordeaux submarine base with Berlin was sabotaged in Limousin. Following this operation, the Germans demanded that serious measures be enforced in what they called "little Russia". Under the command of General Bois 15 guard squadrons, 12 squadrons of the GMT and residual gendarmerie forces were sent in to "maintain order", without significant success. In August 1943, Guingouin undertook anew to prevent wheat deliveries to the Germans by destroying the combines. As "prefect of the maquis", he regulated agricultural sales as well as boltage rates for bread manufacturing in order to counter the black market and fraud. At the same time he received the first parachute drops of armaments from the British Special Operations Executive. During January 1944, he brought together 120 volunteers at the château de Ribérie for military training. Shortly afterward, the German General Walter Brehmer attacked Guingouin's territory; Guingouin refused battle and dispersed his units.

In May 1944, Haute-Vienne had about 8,000 armed men, the most of any department in France. After the amalgamation of the Armée Secrète, ORA and FTPF resistance movements into the new French Forces of the Interior the structures of the armed resistance remained confused, so that in spite of the unification, the FTPF retained the possibility of acting autonomously. Photos of the maquis and its leader were taken at this time by the photographer Izis Bidermanas who had also taken up arms. On the evening of 9 june 1944 resistance fighters under sergeant Jean Canou part of Georges Guingouin group captured Major Helmut Kämpfe, considered the division hero between Saint-Léonard-de-Noblat and Sauviat-sur-Vige. Since 1986 a commemorative stele created by artist Jean-Joseph Sanfourche has stood along this road to mark the event.

At the start of July 1944, Guingouin was warned that a German offensive was being prepared against his maquis. On the 17th, the 1st brigade was attacked by the German brigade of General Curt von Jesser with a strength of 500 vehicles, supported by various reinforcements. This triggered the battle of Mont Gargan. The maquis lost 97 men (38 dead, 5 missing, 54 wounded) against 342 killed and wounded on the German side. It was one of the rare occasions when the resistance fought against the Wehrmacht in open battle.

At the beginning of June 1944, Guingouin was ordered to take Limoges by Léon Mauvais, an important communist party official and head of the FTP in the zone Sud. Guingouin refused, considering the operation premature and dangerous for the general population. In support of his decision he cited the tragic example of the premature liberation of Tulle, where, in reprisals, 99 men had been hanged from balconies on the main road of the city, and 101 others deported. Guingouin's refusal would have grave consequences for relations between Guingouin and the communist party hierarchy.

On 21 August, Guingouin encircled Limoges, and received from Jean d'Albis the surrender of General Gleiniger's men, with minimal bloodshed. Guingouin was appointed lieutenant-colonel of the French Forces of the Interior.

Following this, Guingouin would be accused of being directly or indirectly responsible for extortion which accompanied the liberation and "épuration" (cleansing) of Limoges and Limousin. According to Henri Amouroux, Guingouin had "45 people tried and sentenced to death in a week, of whom only one escaped", and that the first to be accused did not have anyone represent them in defense, and "worked from six to twelve hours per day, including Saturday and Sunday."

Guingouin was also accused of acquiring loot from a former youth work camp at Chamberet which would result in 6 executions, including three members of the Armée secrète.

== Pariah of the Communist Party ==
On 20 November 1944, Guingouin was seriously injured in a car accident (he suggested that his vehicle had been sabotaged) and hospitalised at Limoges. He was released in April 1945 after a long convalescence. In May 1945, Guingouin was elected mayor of Limoges. His relations with the communist party rapidly deteriorated. He was not proposed for a seat on the central committee, nor appointed to the deputation. At the assembly of communist elected officials of France on the 12 November 1945, he was subjected to an attack by Auguste Gillot (who was close to Maurice Thorez and Jacques Duclos); Gillot criticised him for having raised the price of tram travel in Limoges, a false accusation. However, Guingouin was not given the opportunity to respond, since the meeting ended immediately (see for an anecdote relating the atmosphere in the party at the time). The following month, he was released from his functions in the communist party of Haute-Vienne.

In 1947, Guingouin lost the mayorship of Limoges to a socialist, Léon Betoulle, who had been mayor of Limoges before the war, while his old rival, the French Socialist Party (SFIO) socialist Jean Le Bail, who was despised by all the "genuine" members of the resistance, became deputy for Haute-Vienne. On 19 May the same year, the appeals court of Grenoble gave a judgment condemning in particularly strong terms the paper L'Époque which 17 months previously had accused Guingouin of terrible crimes.

In February 1950, Guingouin seemed to have returned to favour with the communist party, having benefited from "permanent" status on becoming secretary of the communist section in Limoges. This was illusory, however, as he was still the subject of sly attacks; he was always being criticised for having disobeyed party orders in not taking Limoges by force in June 1944. His outspokenness with those high in the party, including Léon Mauvais, did not help. At the 12th party congress, 27 of the 84 central committee members were not reelected, among them some of those closest to Guingouin. Guingouin himself was eventually affected; ordered to submit to party decisions, he gave up his "permanent" status and asked for reinstatement in education. In a public meeting in September 1952 at Nantiat, Jaqcues Duclos personally associated himself with some of the charges previously reported in L'Époque relating to "war booty" which Guingouin had allegedly used to his advantage. In October, the communist authorities asked Guingouin's local association to exclude him. The cell membership refusing, Guingouin was reassigned by fiat to a more compliant local cell, which excluded him from the party the following month.

== Guingouin in exile ==
At this stage Guingouin was granted a request to be transferred as a teacher to the Aube, his wife Henriette's original department. Guingouin had married in 1945 in Limoges.

On 24 December 1953, Guingouin was called before the juge d'instruction of Tulle concerning a murder of two villagers in which members of the resistance who had been under Guingouin's authority were accused. According to the historian Michel Taubmann, this marked the beginning of a conspiracy by police officers and magistrates who had been against Guingouin during the war. The instigator of the plot was the police commissaire known as "C." who once in 1943 had been against Guingouin when the Bussy-Varache viaduct was destroyed. A police inspector, "A.", who had led an enquiry about the disappearance of explosives from the Saint-Léonard mine. "A." had declared to an intern who was being transferred "It will be no-one other than me who brings down le Grand" (referring to Guingouin).

Imprisoned in Tulle, Guingouin was beaten in his cell by warders at Brive prison. Injured and unconscious, he was transferred by night to Toulouse where he arrived in poor psychological and physical condition. As the press reported a suicide attempt, the former resistance fighters of Haute-Garonne who had been part of a resistance committee in the department spoke out, and under pressure from them, the juge d’instruction ordered Guingouin's mental health to be assessed by three doctors. In their report, they testified to traces of the abuse which Guingouin had undergone, and wrote that Gungouin's state evoked real concern for his life. Guingouin was finally freed on 13 November 1959, at Lyon; with the magistrate Thomas, charged with making enquiries about him, declared that neither his soul nor his conscience could believe that anyone had envisaged prosecuting Guingouin. This episode was described in The Times' obituary of Guingouin in the following way:

Defended now by two young lawyers, Roland Dumas and Robert Badinter (both known to any student of the Mitterrand years, the former as Foreign Secretary, the latter as the man who abolished the death penalty in 1981), Guingouin was released on bail, but the investigations continued until 1959. Only then did the public prosecutor conclude that: "in all conscience, I cannot understand why proceedings were taken against Georges Guingouin".

On 21 November 2001, at a conference before history professors of the Aube, Guingouin described the events: "arrested on Christmas eve 1953, held in Brive prison, I underwent such abuse that two times I ran the road of those sufferers who see their entire life before them in their last moments before the dazzling light."

In March 1957, Guingouin joined the Mouvement communiste démocratique et national of Auguste Lecoeur and Pierre Hervé. In 1961, he entered into discussions with the party with the aim of being reaccepted. He affirmed that he had been offered reacceptance on condition of silence. Refusing this offer, he dedicated himself to his job as a teacher, and retired in 1969.

In 1985, the extreme-right publication Le Crapouillot, published by Minute took up some of the accusations which had been previously leveled at Guingouin, alleging that he had been responsible for some of the summary executions which had taken place in the Limoges region. Guingouin brought a complaint, and this time received the support of members of the general council of Haute-Vienne. The memorial marking the abduction of Helmut Kämpfe at Moissannes, on the N141, was designed by the artist Jean-Joseph Sanfourche and inaugurated in 1986 by Georges Guingouin.

In 1998, the Communist Party officially "rehabilitated" Guingouin. Guingouin's response was phlegmatic:

It's a problem the Party has with itself. It doesn't concern me any more. I've reached the age of serenity.

Guingouin died in Troyes on the 27 October 2005, and was buried at Saint-Gilles-les-Forêts according to his wishes.

In June 2005, Guingouin was promoted to the rank of commander of the Légion d'honneur. He was also a compagnon de la Libération (by decree of 19 October 1945), bearer of the Croix de Guerre with palm, the médaille de la Résistance with rosette and the British King's Medal for Courage.

== Quotes ==
"Que les Limousins, les Occitans, refusant le miroir déformant qu'on leur offre, retrouvent leur patrimoine historique!" (May the people of Limousin, the Occitans, refuse the distorted mirror that is on offer, and regain their historic heritage) - Discourse at Le Vigen on the 22 August 1982.

=== See also ===
- French Communist Party
- French resistance
- Maquis du Limousin
- The Oradour-sur-Glane massacre

== Writings of Georges Guingouin ==
- Georges Guingouin, Quatre ans de lutte sur le sol limousin, Hachette-Littérature, 287 pp., 1974.
- Georges Guingouin et Gérard Monédiaire, Georges Guingouin, premier maquisard de France, éditions Lucien Souny, 1983
- Speech of Georges Guingouin at the conference/discussion bringing together history teachers in the Aube department, presided over by the inspector of the académie, Jacques Marchal, Troyes, 21 November 2001
- Biography http://www.ordredelaliberation.fr

== Other sources ==
- Taubmann Michel, L'affaire Guingouin, la véritable histoire du premier maquisard de France, éditions Lucien Souny, 1994–2004
- Taubmann Michel, Georges Guingouin ou la geste du Grand , article appearing on the Reforme.net website on Guingouin's death <https://web.archive.org/web/20061125124235/http://www.reforme.net/archive/article.php?num=3150&ref=1012>
- Jean Maitron, article in Dictionnaire biographique du mouvement ouvrier français, Editions ouvrières.
- Robrieux Philippe, Histoire intérieure du parti communiste, Tomes 2 & 4, Fayard, 1980–84
- Bourdrel Philippe, L'épuration sauvage 1944-45, Perrin, 2002
- Trouillé Pierre, Journal d'un préfet sous l'Occupation, Gallimard, 1964
- Faligot Roger, Kaufer Rémi, Les Résistants, Fayard, 1989
- Fouché Jean-Jacques, Juchereau Francis, Monédiaire Gérard, Georges Guingouin, chemin de résistances, éditions Lucien Souny, Cercle Gramsci Limoges
