= Jean Bène =

French politician (1901–1992)

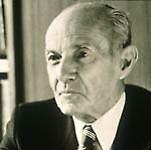
Jean Béne

Jean Bène (12 July 1901 – 26 April 1992) was a lifelong politician in France and a leader in the French Resistance.

== Biography ==
Bène was born in Pézenas, Hérault. Initially a lawyer, he turned to politics. He was a member of the Parti Socialiste in the SFIO. Bène was conseiller municipal of Pézenas in 1929, then mayor in 1931. He was recalled by the Vichy regime.

He involved himself in the resistance and created the La Tourette maquis, one of the maquis networks of resistance fighters, in the commune of Ferrières-Poussarou. For this he would be decorated with the Légion d'honneur, the Croix de guerre and the médaille de la Résistance.

He returned to the mayorship of Pézenas from 1945 to 1947 and then from 1953 to 1977. In 1945 he became president of the conseil général of the Hérault, and continued in this role until 1979. He was senator for the Hérault from 1959 until 1971, during which he was on the commissions for foreign affairs, for defense and for the armed forces.

The collège de Pézenas is named in his honour.
