= Maquis La Tourette =

The Maquis La Tourette was one of the maquis groups of French resistance fighters during the German occupation of France in the Second World War.

The maquis was created by Jean Bène, inserted into the high cantons of the Hérault département in the Ferrières-Poussarou commune. It operated as far as Béziers.
