= Gargan =

Gargan may refer to:

- Edward Gargan (1902–1964), American actor
- Jack Gargan (politician), chairman of the Reform Party and candidate for the United States House of Representatives
- Jack Gargan (hurler) (1918–1991), Irish hurler
- John Gargan (disambiguation)
- Dan Gargan (born 1982), American soccer player
- Sam Gargan (footballer) (born 1989), English footballer
- Sam Gargan (politician) (1948–2025), Canadian politician
- Mac Gargan, fictional character and most well-known incarnation of Spider-Man villain, the Scorpion

Mount Gargan has been used to describe various mountains said to have been visited by Michael the Archangel:

- Monte Gargano or San'Angelo, a mountain in Italy
- Mont Gargan, a mountain in France
