= Jack Gargan =

Jack Gargan may refer to:

- Jack Gargan (politician) (1930–2018), chairman of the Reform Party and candidate for the United States House of Representatives
- Jack Gargan (hurler) (1918–1991), Irish hurler

== See also ==
- John Gargan (disambiguation)
