= Chamberet =

- Commune
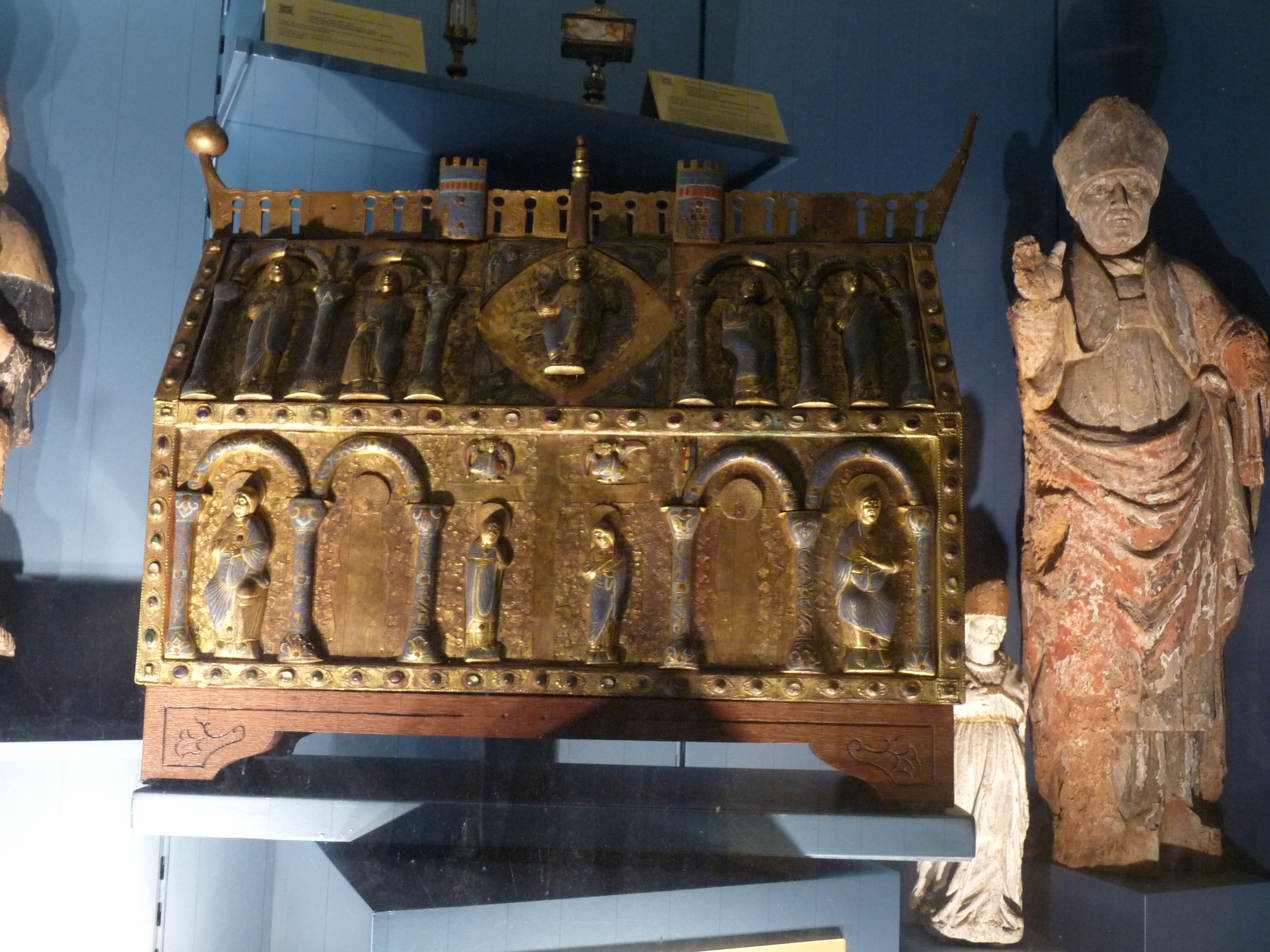
- The shrine of Saint-Dulcet

- Coat of arms
- Location of Chamberet
- Location within France Location within Nouvelle-Aquitaine
- Coordinates: 45°35′03″N 1°43′14″E
- Country: France
- Region: Nouvelle-Aquitaine
- Department: Corrèze
- Arrondissement: Tulle
- Canton: Seilhac-Monédières

Government
  - Mayor (2020–2026): Bernard Rual
- Area^{1}: 69.85 km^{2} (26.97 sq mi)
- Highest elevation: 727 m (2,385 ft)
- Lowest elevation: 376 m (1,234 ft)
- Population (2023): 1,433
  - Density: 20.52/km^{2} (53.13/sq mi)
- Time zone: UTC+01:00 (CET)
  - Summer (DST): UTC+02:00 (CEST)
- INSEE/Postal code: 19036 /19370
- ^{1} French Land Register data, which excludes lakes, ponds, glaciers > 1 km^{2} (0.386 sq mi or 247 acres) and river estuaries.

Chamberet is a commune in the Corrèze department in central France.

== History ==
The name of Chamberet appears for the first time in 930, when the relics of Saint-Dulcet came to mark the creation of the village.

== Geography ==
=== Location ===
A Commune of the Massif Central, the town is located on the plateau of Millevaches Massif in the parc naturel régional de Millevaches en Limousin, near Treignac in the north of the Corrèze department and bordering the department of the Haute-Vienne. It is close to Mount Gargan and the Monédières.

=== Population ===
Historical population
Year	Pop.	±% p.a.
1968	1,413	—
1975	1,415	+0.02%
1982	1,470	+0.55%
1990	1,376	−0.82%
1999	1,304	−0.60%
2007	1,319	+0.14%
2012	1,342	+0.35%
2017	1,372	+0.44%
2023	1,433	+0.73%
Source: INSEE

=== Hydrography ===
The commune is watered by two tributaries of the Vézère: the Bradascou and the Soudaine.

== Economy ==
The economy of the commune is oriented towards tourism, with a hotel, restaurants, a campsite, seven Gites, a village "Espace nature", a municipal swimming pool, an arboretum, an adventure park, nature activities (golf, orientation...), trailers and chalets. There is also a public research station for horses, Station expérimentale de Chamberet.

== Places and monuments ==
=== Church of Saint-Dulcet ===
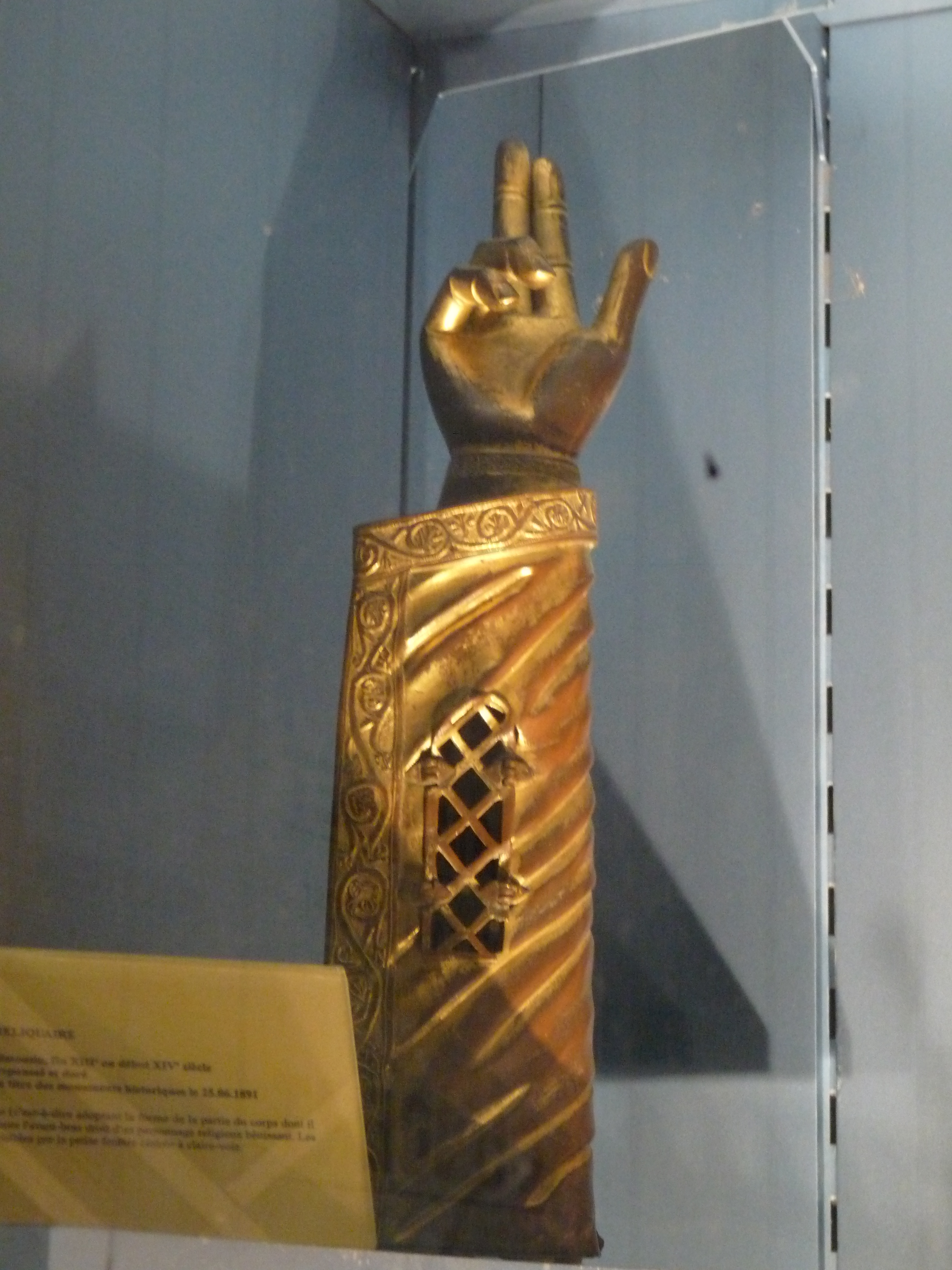
Copper reliquary arm

The Church of Saint-Dulcet (parish church) dates from the 12th century. It has been restored at different times as a result of various fires and other disasters.

- In the 10th century, the church and the houses were wooden, it was only 1127 to 1137 that the present church was built by the monks of Uzerche and the Comborn.
- The relics of Saint-Dulcet were transported to Chamberet so that they escaped from the Norman raiders who put Aquitaine to blood and fire in the 12th century.
- The steeple, destroyed during the religious wars, was rebuilt in 1660.
- Struck by lightning on Christmas morning 1818, the collapse of the bell tower would cause three deaths during a service.
- On 29 July 1881, a fire that developed in a nearby bakery would cause the loss of the sacristy covered with wood shingles.
- The church was restored at the end of the 19th century.

On the porch there is a medieval headstone erected like a cross.

Since 25 June 1981, following elements in the Church of Chamberet are classified as historic monuments:

- The great enamelled Shrine of the 13th century, representing the burial of Saint-Dulcet
- 14th century copper reliquary arm

=== Other monuments ===
- Hydrant, dated the second half of the early 19th century;
- Château d'Enval, built between the seventeenth to the nineteenth centuries, with its landscape park from the end of the 19th century, listed as a historic monuments on 29 May 1991;
- Chapelle Saint-Nicolas (rebuilt in 1827, it existed in the 11th century)
- The former presbytery was housed in a manor house from the second half of the 16th century, and was restored at the end of the 19th century

=== Sights ===
- Arboretum de Chamberet

The Maison de l'Arbre, an arboretum, is rooted in regional tourism and educates the public about three themes: peatlands, the role of fungi in the forest ecosystem, and an in-depth study of what a lichen is.

The arboretum consists of a collection of 105 different species, a collection of shrubs, a collection of aquatic plants, a bamboo park, a pond, an apple orchard consisting exclusively of local varieties, including the Reinette Brune Museau de Lièvre de la Corrèze and the Pomme Reinette Dorée Rouge des Vergnes Sainte-Germaine.

== See also ==
- Communes of the Corrèze department
