= Mont Gargan =

Mountain in France

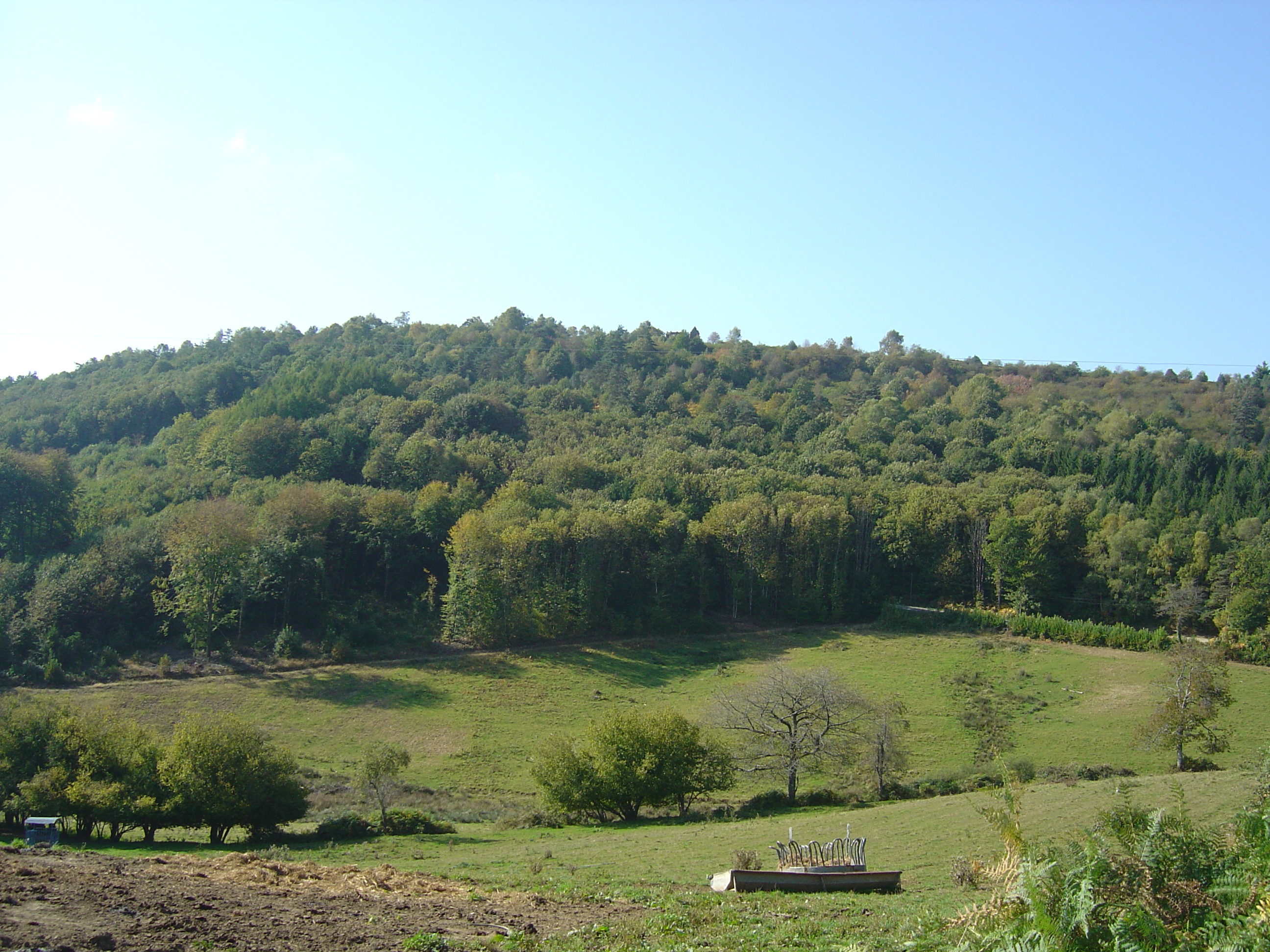
- Mont Gargan seen from Saint-Gilles-les-Forêts

Highest point
- Elevation: 731
- Coordinates: 45°37′14″N 1°38′52″E

Geography
- Location within France
- Location: Haute-Vienne, France
- Parent range: Plateau de Millevaches

Mont Gargan is a peak in the Massif central, situated in the western edge of the commune of Saint-Gilles-les-Forêts in the department of Haute Vienne (87), Nouvelle-Aquitaine, France. The western slope of Mont Gargan, up to 100 metres from the summit, is in the commune of La Croisille Sur Briance. (No part of Mont Gargan is in the commune of Sussac, as previously implied). Mont Gargan is situated in the parc naturel régional de Millevaches en Limousin. Its occitan name is puèg Gerjant and it is the subject of numerous legends.

Mont Gargan has an altitude of 731 metres; at the summit are the remains of a chapel built between 1868 and 1871 by Louis Joyeux with the support of the population, and dedicated to Notre-Dame du Bon Secours. The chapel had become more or less derelict but was partly restored in 1992 by the Haute-Vienne general council and by the Friends of Mont Gargan. Since 1986, the chapel has been the property of the Haute-Vienne department.

The main path to the summit is on the southern slope, which is covered in a small forest containing many huge and ancient beech trees. The summit was at one time covered with heather and gorse, much of which has since given way to a prairie. A rock panel has an inscription which recalls the Second World War battle of Mont Gargan fought between the German army and the maquis resistance fighters led by Georges Guingouin. There is also a circular look-out point which has a diagram identifying places in the surrounding countryside. The views from this point are spectacular.

Contrary to what is widely stated in books and maps, Mount Gargan is not the highest point in Haute-Vienne; the Puy Lagarde, 30 kilometres to the north-east near Beaumont-du-Lac, is higher, at 799 metres above sea level.

== Gallery ==
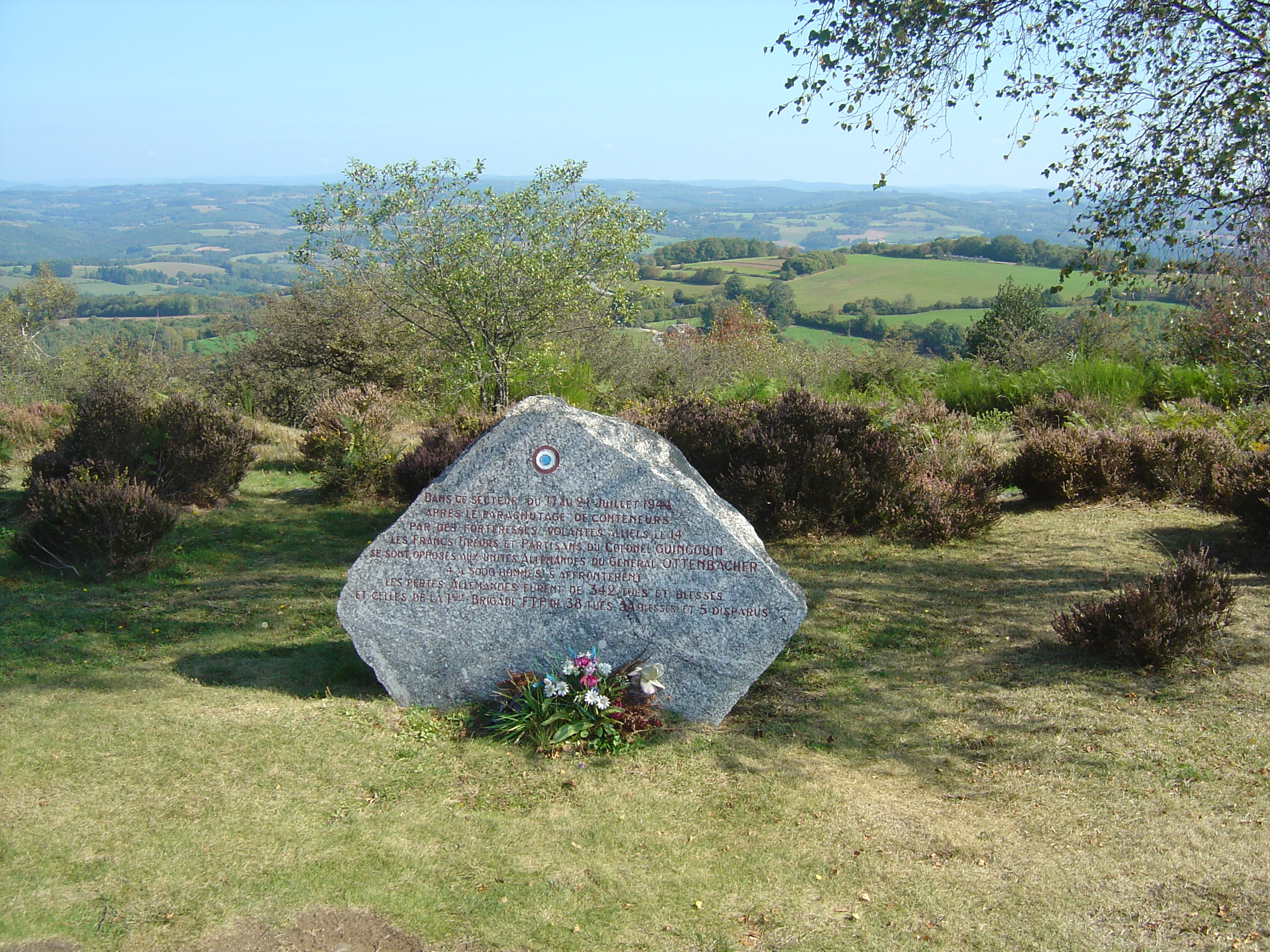
Stele commemorating the fighting of July 1944 in the region of Mount Gargan

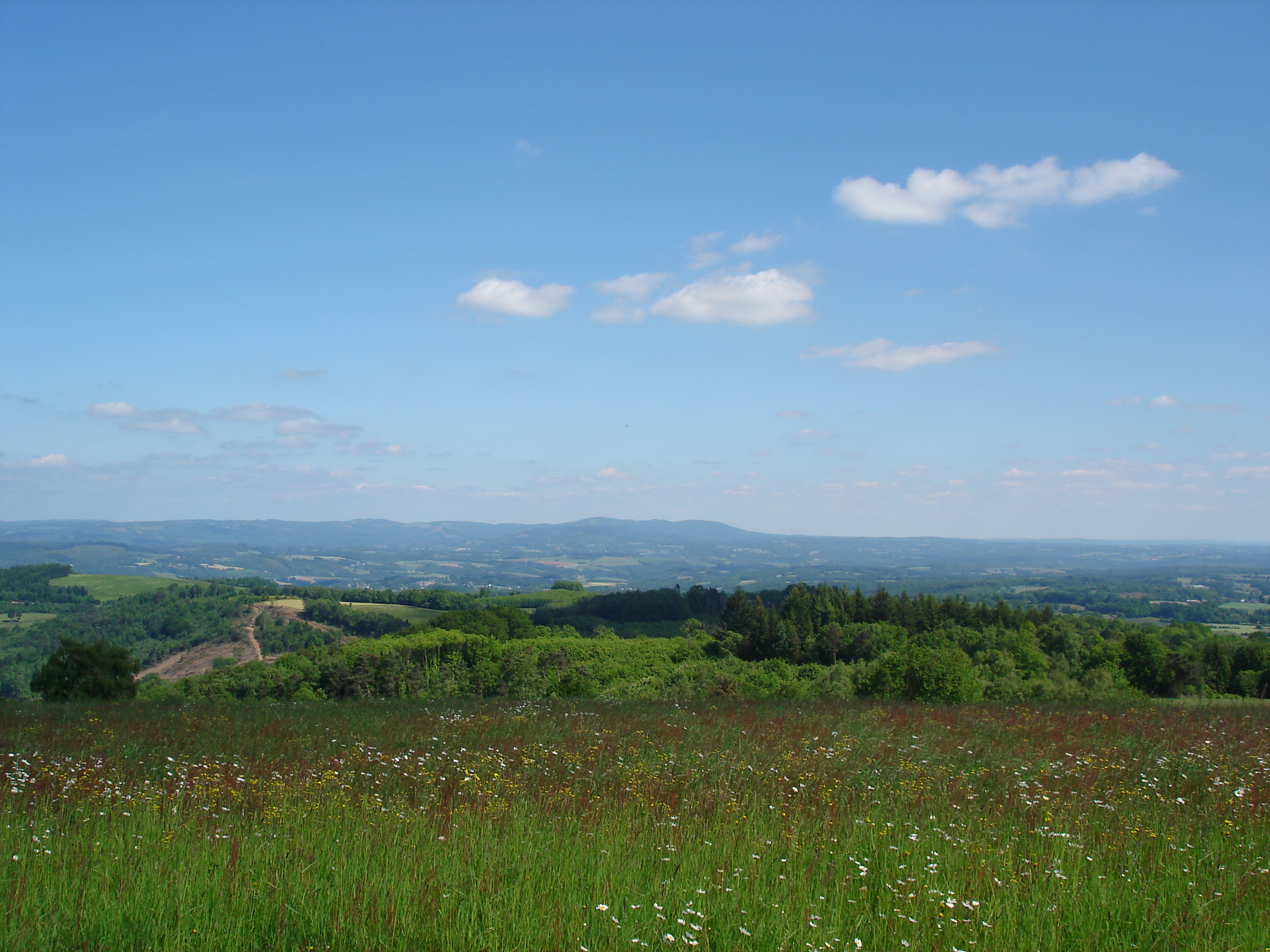
View around the puy, with the Massif des Monédières in the centre.

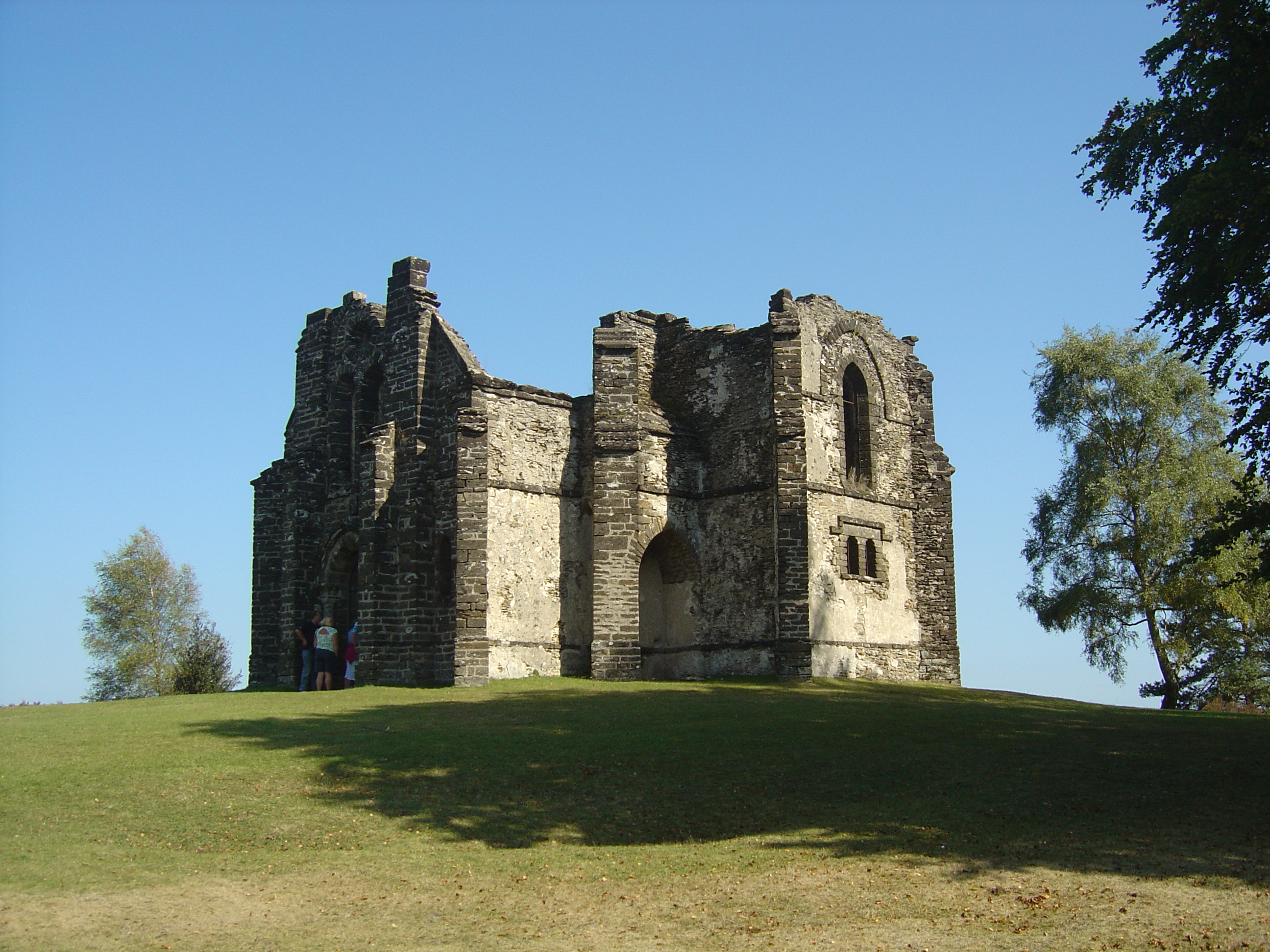
Mont Gargan chapel

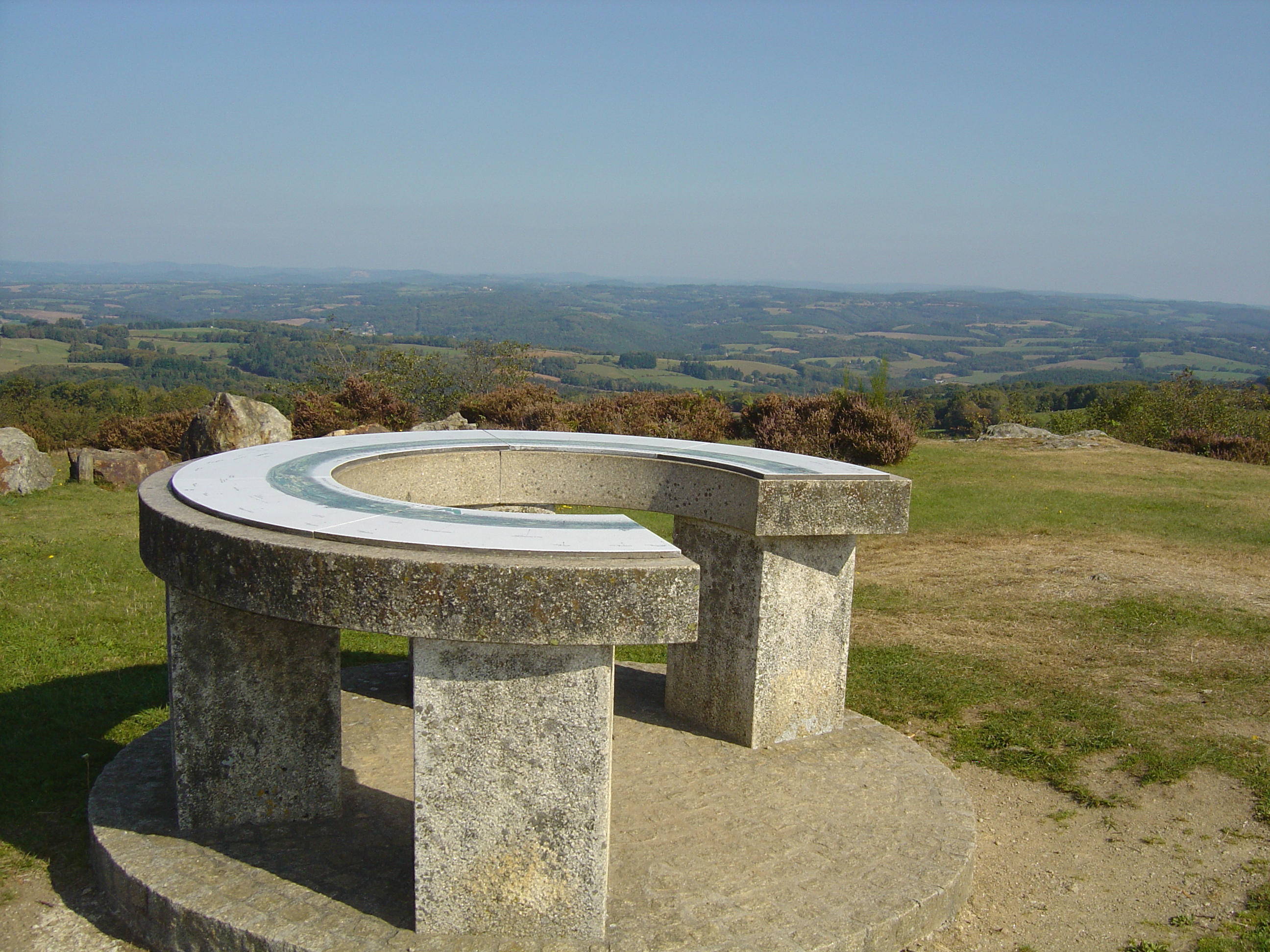
Public information point on Mont Gargan
