= Maquis de Saffré =

Coordinates: 47.5025°N 1.5775°W

The Maquis de Saffré was one of the maquis groups of French resistance fighters active in the Loire-Atlantique region, in the triangle formed by the communes of Héric, Nort-sur-Erdre et Saffré.

One of Germany's last operations, in June 1944, was the destruction of this maquis, where 350 poorly equipped young resistance fighters ("maquisards") stood up to 2,500 Germans, before dispersing. On 29 June, 27 captured maquisards were shot at La Bouvardière château.

== Bibliography (French) ==
- Le Drame du Maquis de Saffré, A. Perraud-Charmantier, Editions du Fleuve, Nantes 1946
- Soldats de l'Ombre 1939-1944, Briac Le Diouron
