= Arboretum de Chamberet =

Arboretum in Chamberet, Corrèze, Limousin, France

Coordinates: 45.589207°N 1.721074°E

The Arboretum de Chamberet (10 hectares) is an arboretum located in the Parc d'Angle, Chamberet, Corrèze, Limousin, France. It is open daily and admission is free. The arboretum contains 105 tree varieties, including species native to Limosin (beech, birch, oak, etc.) as well as exotic trees such as Araucaria araucana from Chile, bald cypress, and catalpas. It also includes some 60 varieties of fruit trees, bamboos, and two peat bogs.

== See also ==
- List of botanical gardens in France
