= John Gargan =

John Gargan may refer to:

- Frank Gargan (John Francis Gargan), American football player and coach
- John Gargan, see Candidates of the Queensland state election, 1950
- John Gargan (footballer) (1928–2007), English footballer

== See also ==
- Jack Gargan (disambiguation)
