= Maquis de Fontjun =

The Maquis de Fontjun was one of the maquis networks of French resistance fighters against the German occupation during World War II. The Fontjun maquis was active in the west of the Hérault département, between Saint-Pons and Béziers.

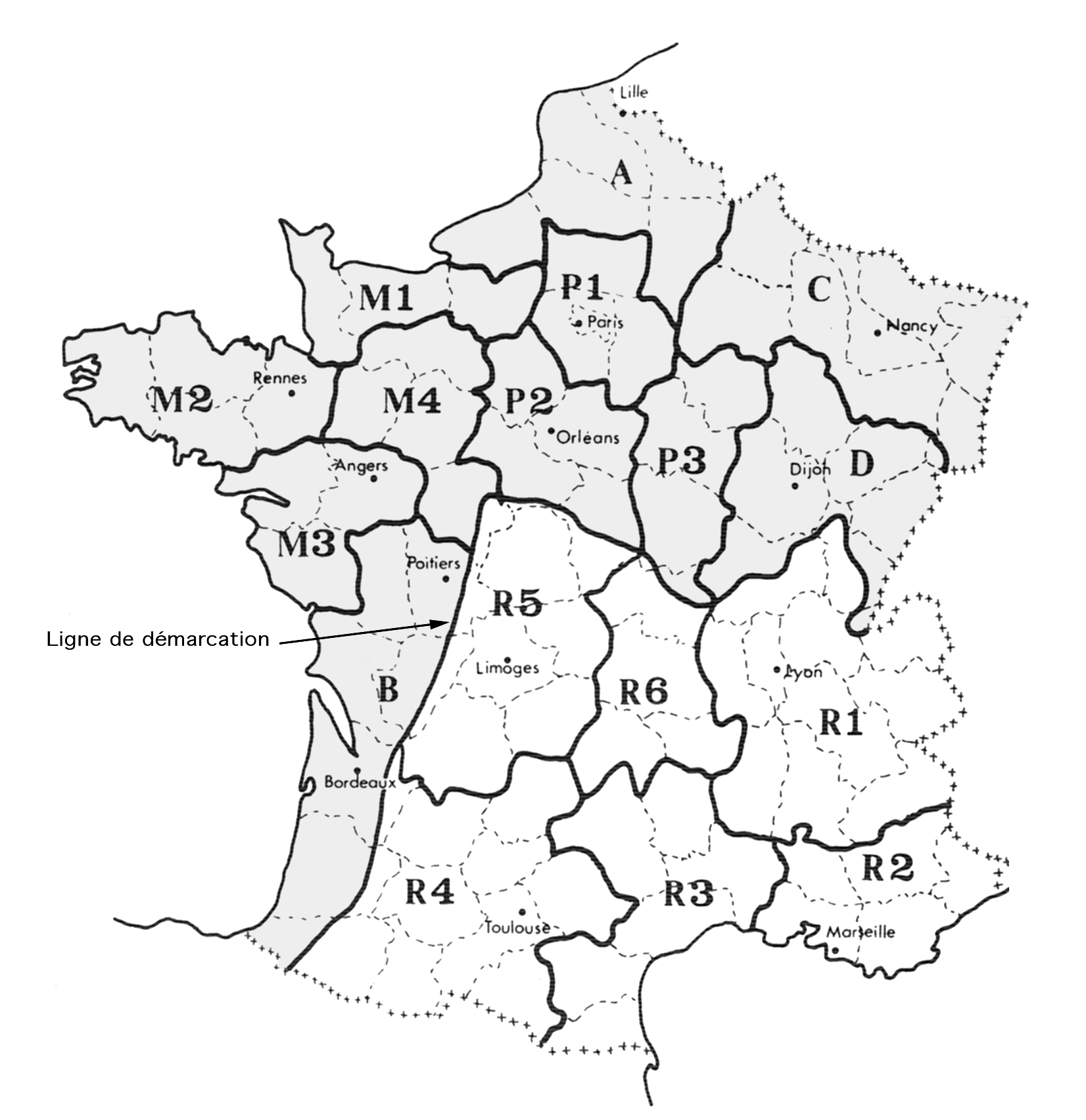
Geographic organization of the French Resistance, showing the Hérault in R3.

== Composition of the maquis ==
The members of the maquis were originally from the canton of Capestang:

- Marc Albert, from Montady .
- Elie Amouroux, from Capestang.
- Louis Baisse, from Capestang.
- Guy Bourdel, from Capestang.
- Bertin Bousquet, from Montady.
- Danton Cabrol, from Capestang.
- Simon-Paul Cabrol, from Capestang.
- Juliette Cauquil, from Puisserguier.
- Roger Cauquil, from Puisserguier.
- André Combet, from Capestang.
- Pierre Cros, from Nissan-lez-Ensérune.
- Pierre Dez, from Nissan-lez-Ensérune.
- Louis Huc, from Montady.
- Emile Loscos, from Capestang.
- Ignace Malet, from Capestang.
- Henri Massat, from Capestang.
- Salvador Montagne, from Puisserguier.
- André Seguret, from Montady.
- Maurice Sol, from Capestang.
- Henry Villeneuve, from Montady.

The maquisards were shot on 7 June 1944 at the place du Champ-de-Mars at Béziers.
