= Maquis Vallier =

Resistance fighter group in World War II

The Maquis Vallier was one of the maquis groups of resistance fighters during World War II. The maquis operated in the north of the Var département, particularly in the valley of the Verdon.

The Maquis Vallier was initially part of the Mouvements Unis de la Résistance (MUR) organization, before becoming the primary structure of the Armée secrète (AS) in its zone. In 1944, it was under the authority of the comité départemental de libération.

The maquis Vallier was led by the Lieutenant Claude Vallier (Gleb Sivirine). Like many maquis in that region, the Maquis Vallier did not participate directly in the liberation of its sector, but joined the Massif des Maures and the coast in August 1944 to support the Provence landings.

== Sources ==
- Jean-Marie Guillon, Les années de guerre dans le pays du Verdon varois, in verdon no 6, automne 2001, p 90–104 (French).
- Lieutenant Vallier-Gleb Sivirine, « Le Cahier rouge du maquis », & Claude et Jean-Michel Sivirine « L’Homme boussole », éd. Paroles, 2007.(French)
