= Maquis du Limousin =

Group of French resistance fighters during World War II

The Maquis du Limousin was one of the largest of the Maquis groups fighting in the French Resistance during World War II.

The region of Limousin was an active area of resistance beginning in 1940.

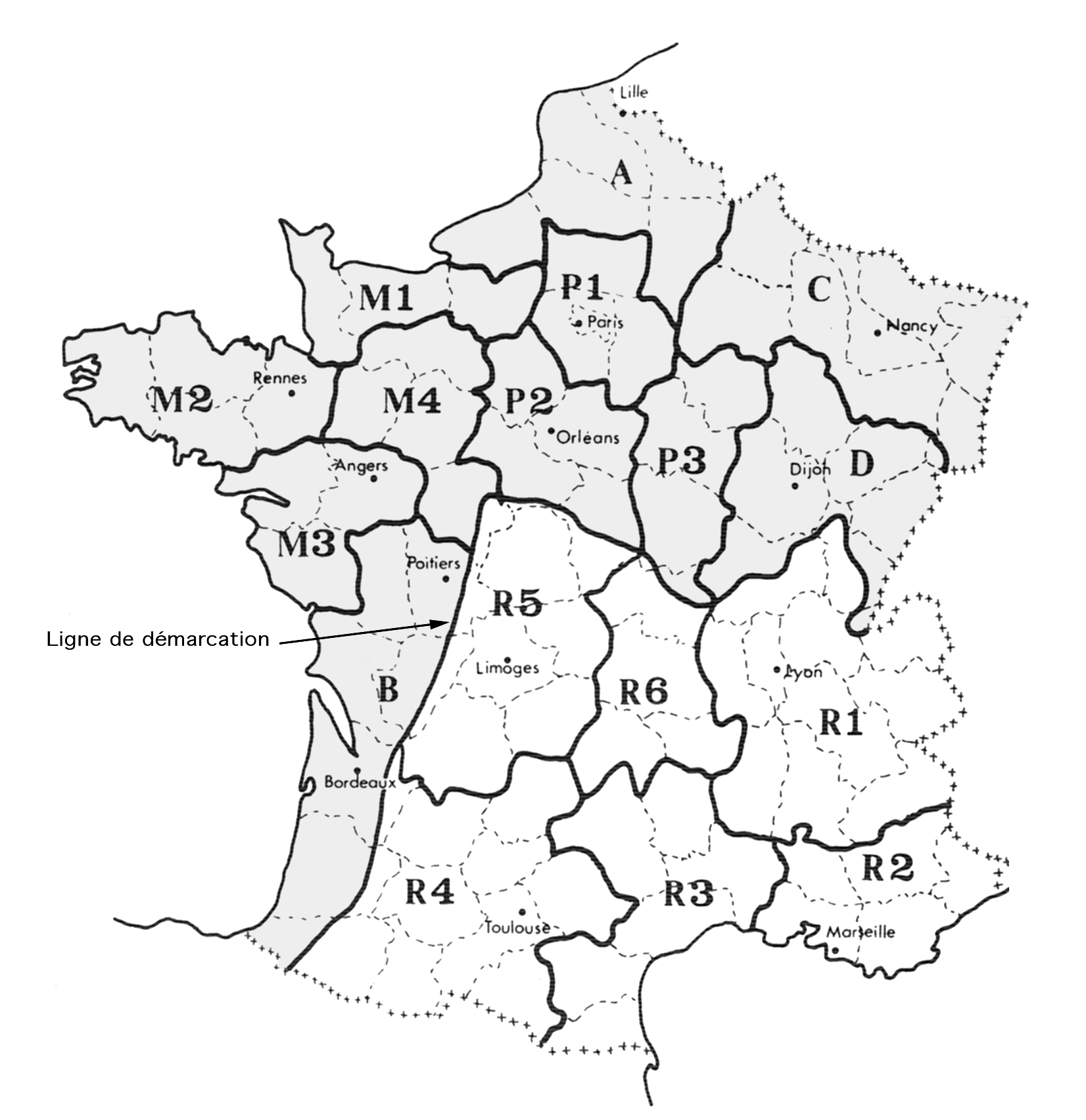
Geographic organization of the French Resistance, showing the Limousin region in R5.

Edmond Michelet distributed tracts in all of Brive-la-Gaillarde's mailboxes on 17 June 1940, calling for continued fighting. It is considered to be the first act of resistance of World War II in France. But the Limousin was south of the line of demarcation and the resistance was mainly a passive one against Vichy France. The Maquis du Limousin, the first in France, was formed in 1942. Its first act of sabotage was the dynamiting of a power plant near Ussel in June 1942. Marshal Philippe Pétain's visit to Corrèze in July was seen by the population as a provocation and strengthened popular support for the maquis.

The maquis increased fast, reinforced by many young men trying to escape the German troops who invaded in November 1942 and instituted the STO in early 1943. Maquis operations changed from sabotages in 1943 to massive attacks against occupation troops in 1944. At its peak, the Limousine maquis is estimated to have reached between 8,000 and 12,000 fighters. However, it was troubled by continuing antagonisms between the Armée secrète and the Francs-Tireurs et Partisans concerning operational methods (particularly at Tulle and Guéret), how local powers should be distributed after the liberation, as well as the degree to which "cleansing" of collaborators from the political system should take place.

The Limousin population paid a heavy toll for its resistance. Numerous maquisards were killed, executed, tortured or deported. Following the Normandy landings, the 2nd SS Division Das Reich, stationed in Montauban, was ordered to make its way across the country to help stop the Allied advance. Along their way into Corrèze and Haute-Vienne, the Germans came under continuous attacks from the maquisards. In reprisal, they slaughtered hundreds of civilians in Tulle on June 9 and at Oradour-sur-Glane on 10 June 1944. Limousin and France were profoundly affected by these massacres.

The region was entirely freed by the Resistance by the end of the summer of 1944. German troops, mostly made up of veterans from the Eastern Front, were subject to so many attacks and sabotages that they called the Limousin "Little Russia". Brive-la-Gaillarde was the first city in France to be freed by maquisards on 15 August 1944, ten days before Paris.

Led by Georges Guingouin for the military operations and Gontran Royer for the Mouvements unis de la Résistance, the best known figures in the Maquis du Limousin were Edmond Michelet and André Malraux —who later both became ministers of Charles de Gaulle—, Roger Lescure, Louis Lemoigne, René Vaujour and Marius Guedin. Jacques Renouvin, André Delon, Martial Brigouleix, Raymond Farro and Florentin Gourmelen, also prominent maquisards in Limousin, were killed during the war.

The Maquis du Limousin was led from Brive-la-Gaillarde and Limoges. The maquis was split into several main sectors:

- Maquis Armée secrète de Basse-Corrèze (at Brive-la-Gaillarde), Moyenne-Corrèze (at Tulle) and Haute-Corrèze (at Neuvic-Ussel)
- Maquis Francs-tireurs et partisans between Corrèze and Dordogne
- Maquis Armée secrète Creusois (at Guéret)
- Maquis Francs-tireurs et partisans Limousin (at Saint-Gilles-les-Forêts)

== Sources ==
- Beau (Georges), Gaubusseau (Léopold), Les SS en Limousin, Quercy et Périgord, Paris, Presses de la Cité, 1966. (in French)
- Maquis de Corrèze, ouvrage collectif, 5e édition, Naves, Imprimerie du Corrézien, 1995, 797 p. (in French)
- Plas (Pascal, dir.), Genèse et développement de la Résistance en R5, 1940-1943, Actes des colloques de Brive-la-Gaillarde (September 1998) et de Soudaine-Lavinadière (September 2001), Treignac, éditions Les Monédières; Brive-la-Gaillarde, Centre Edmond Michelet, 2003, 339 p. (in French)

== Museum ==
- Centre national d'études de la Résistance et de la Déportation Edmond Michelet, 4 rue Champanatier 19100 Brive-la-Gaillarde
