= Maquis (World War II) =

French resistance groups

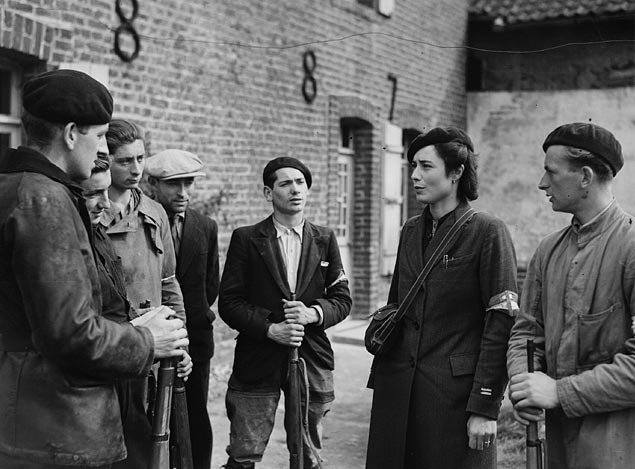
Members of the Maquis in La Tresorerie

The Maquis (French pronunciation: [maki]) were rural guerrilla bands of French and Belgian Resistance fighters, called maquisards, during World War II. Initially, they were composed of young, mostly working-class men who had escaped into the mountains and forests to resist conscription into Vichy France's Service du travail obligatoire (STO; 'Compulsory Work Service') which provided slave labor for Germany. To avoid capture and deportation to Germany, they became increasingly organized into active resistance groups.

They had an estimated 25,000 to 40,000 members in autumn of 1943 and approximately 100,000 members in June 1944.

== Meaning ==
The maquis made up one component of the mosaic of the resistance in France and Belgium. The maquis refers to the organization of bands of resistance guerrillas which emerged in rural France, mainly in the south. The maquis were emergent in 1943 and were also active in 1944.

The term maquis comes from the Corsican machja, the dense shrubland covering most of Corsica’s terrain. Guerrilla fighters in France used tactics popularized by Corsican bandits in the nineteenth century, and the resistance popularized the Corsican phrase “to take the maquis” (French: prendre le maquis; from Corsican piglià a machja), meaning to evade law enforcement.

The term maquis signified both the group of fighters and their rural location. Members of those bands were called maquisards. Their image was that of a committed and voluntary fighter, a combattant, as opposed to the previous réfractaire (lit. 'refractory'; 'unmanageable'). The term became an honorific meaning "armed resistance fighter". The Maquis came to symbolize the French Resistance and was used to describe resistance groups that fought in France before the Allied invasion of Normandy in 1944. Once the Allies had secured a foothold in France, the government of Free France attempted to unite the separate groups of Maquis under the banner of the French Forces of the Interior (FFI).

The national denomination given to all Maquis forces during the war is Forces françaises de l'intérieur, known as the "FFI"; in English, the French Forces of the Interior. This large corp of about 400,000 active members (in 1944) is divided in three major sections, corresponding to three political or professional inclinations:

- The Francs-Tireurs et Partisans (FTP), a para-military body created and controlled by the Parti Communiste français, the French Communist Party.
- The Armée secrète (the AS; lit. 'Secret Army'), mostly led by French army officers and with a right-wing tilt.
- The Organisation de résistance de l'armée (the ORA; 'Resistance organisation of the army'), formally created in January 1943 as a more "official" and apolitical body for the continuation of armed struggle by ex-French military personnel in the Zone libre (southern half of metropolitan France).

All three groups were deemed "terrorists" by the Vichy regime of the French State and by German authorities and other neighbouring fascist regimes. Other (rare) local groups did not affiliate with these organisations.

== Operations ==
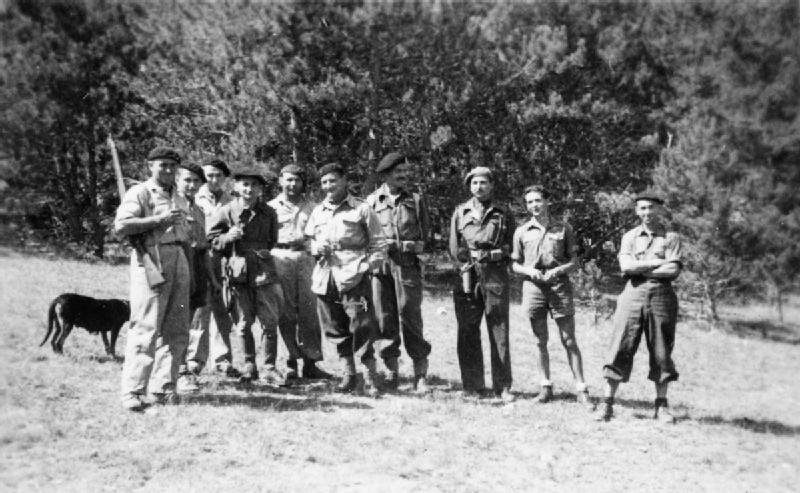
Maquisards (Resistance fighters) in the Hautes-Alpes département in August 1944. Third and fourth from the right are two SOE officers. Second from right is probably Christine Granville.

Most maquisards operated in the remote or mountainous areas of Brittany and southern France, especially in the Alps and in Limousin. They relied on guerrilla tactics to harass the Milice (the Vichy militia) and German occupation troops. The Maquis also aided the escape of downed Allied airmen, Jews and others pursued by the Vichy and German authorities. Maquisards usually relied on some degree of sympathy or cooperation from the local populace. Most of the Maquis cells—like the Maquis du Limousin or the Maquis du Vercors—took names after the area they were operating in. The size of these cells varied from tens to thousands of men and women.

In March 1944, with the Allies gaining ascendancy, Maquis groups intensified their operations. In reaction to their weakening power, the occupiers and Vichy collaborationists began a terror campaign throughout France, enacted by German military units and the Milice. This included reprisals by SS troops against civilians living in areas where the French resistance was active, such as the Oradour-sur-Glane, the Maillé and the Tulle massacres. The Maquisards exacted their revenge, both at the time with reactive atrocities and later in the épuration sauvage (lit. 'savage purge': 'savage' or 'wild' intended to indicate it was undertaken before the rule of law was reestablished) that took place after the war's end.

In French Indochina, the local resistance fighting the Japanese since 1941 was backed up by a special forces airborne commando unit created by de Gaulle in 1943, and known as the Corps Léger d'Intervention (CLI). They were supplied by airlifts of the British Force 136.

== Politics ==
Politically, the Maquis included right-wing nationalists, liberals, socialists, communists, and anarchists. Some Maquis bands that operated in southwest France were composed entirely of left-wing Spanish veterans of the Spanish Civil War. Spanish Civil War veteran Carlos Romero Giménez was a centrist republican operating from Bordeaux.

According to Matthew Cobb, the Communist Maquis groups adopted more active and immediate guerrilla tactics to combat the Nazis, while the groups affiliated with De Gaulle were asked to wait for a larger attack later in the war. Thus, some maquis joined Communist groups simply to be part of a more active resistance movement and not because of their politics. Georges Guingouin was one of the most active Communist Maquis leaders.

The British Special Operations Executive (SOE) helped the Maquis who were affiliated with the Free French with supplies and agents, help which was not extended to the Communist Maquis groups. The American Office of Strategic Services (OSS) also began to send its own agents to France in cooperation with the SOE and the French BCRA agents, as part of Operation Jedburgh.

The Maquis had many different sub groups with their own objectives and political affiliations. In 1944, an OSS agent, Robert R. Kehoe, was embedded within a group of Maquis and described the organization as "fractured", observing that "the various components were quite independent, with members loyal to their own leaders and to the political forces behind them". Different ideologies within the subgroups created tensions that had to be put aside at times during the war but prosecuted those of the far right after. People like Georges Loustaunau-Lacau and Marie-Madeleine Fourcade, leaders of the French Resistance group Alliance, were both questioned about their loyalty during and after the war. This came as no surprise as both were from far-right political backgrounds, that didn’t favor the dominant Gaullist narrative. Lacau suffered the most, all the way up to his death by being put in jail several times, and accused by communist colleagues of siding with the Germans, while Fourcade was able to suffer fewer accusations by switching to Gaullism.

Examples of the independence of separate Maquis groups can be found all throughout France during the Second World War. For example, Maquis groups in Brittany often did not speak French and were focused on the expulsion of German forces from their region and not from France as a whole. As they did not operate like a normal resistance organization due to their lack of centralization, the Maquis would not be able to accomplish as much as the Allied nations had hoped.

== History ==
Prior to the inception of the Maquis, small resistance groups were created in the occupied and unoccupied zones of France. In northern and western France, movements like Organisation civile et militaire, Libération-Nord, Ceux de la Libération, Ceux de la Résistance survived through clandestine pamphlets or newspapers, to build up a solidarity of attitudes and disparate actions and to 'taunt the Germans' (narguer les Allemands). Some of these movements also began to hide weapons and plot sabotage. In the Zone Libre, movements were created as early as in the north and west but did not face decimating raids by the authorities, which allowed movements like Combat, Libération-Sud and Franc-Tireur to have a more expansive character.

Resistance groups in the occupied zone eventually became linked to Free French officials in London or the SOE, which undermined German-occupied Europe with specially trained agents. By May 1941, the northern movements, who specialized in sabotage and espionage and the southern movements, who focused on planning escape routes, developed the only major movement common to both, the Front National. Resistance became closely linked with the effects of the occupation and Vichy legislation and as the working class became alienated "resisters and people on the run could be harboured with a degree of safety" in the rural areas of France, resistance had a role and justification in the lives of many people "who had no ambition to hold a gun, or memorize a coded message, though as the occupation grew in its violence the pressure on the French people to defend themselves by force intensified, and the military nature of resistance came to predominate".The connection between the Vichy government and armed resistance paved the way for the eventual formation of the Maquis.

The Service du travail obligatoire (STO; compulsory labor service) was enacted on 16 February 1943 but underwent various refinements and classifications. It required young men born between 1920 and 1922 to register at their mairies (town halls), whereupon the authorities "listed several categories of workers, divided them into those who were exempt, those who would be liable for compulsory service in Germany, and those who would have to work for German industries in France". In the first few months, reports suggest that there were many who refused STO and went into hiding, mostly in areas where people hid Jews and resisters. These first few months of refusal of STO, and the "embryonic camps and groupings that resulted" contributed to the eventual emergence of the mystique and discourse of le maquis.

Politically motivated anti-fascists, immigrant workers on the run, the réfractaires and Spanish Civil War veterans, along with the leniency of the Vichy administration's pursuit of réfractaires, contributed to the emergence of an aggressive movement, with a combative discourse and a romantic mystique of rural revolt. The speed with which the term maquis spread was astonishing, since the concept did not exist in January 1943. By June, talk of the maquis made its way from south-eastern France to the plains of northern France. The Maquis eventually became the national service, due to the large influx of young people in revolt against the STO. This unification was due, in part, to Michel Brault, a Parisian lawyer, who headed the organization of the resisters in April 1943, and to the drafted circulars establishing the Maquis's charter. Within one month, 20,000 copies of the text — which did not exceed the size of a playing card — were distributed throughout the southern zone". Brault, in a report sent to London on 14 February 1944, listed the various elements available for action to the Allies and described the Maquis as "youths who have rebelled against the STO as well as men of all ages who have given up trying to live a normal life [...]. They totalled about 48,000."

== Role ==
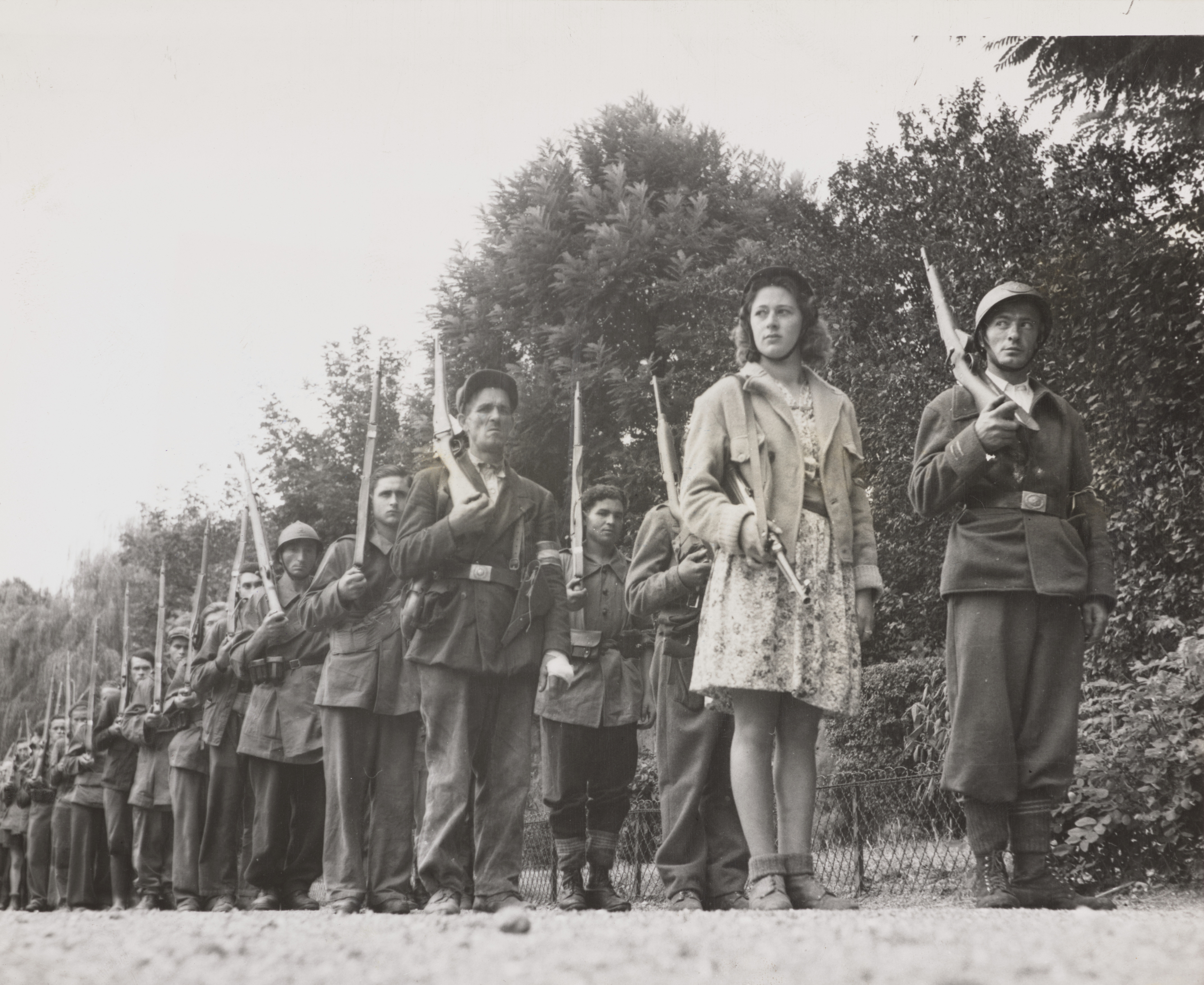
Maquis resistance fighters, Chandres, France, 1944–45

The Maquis de l'Ain, captained by Henri Petit (alias Romans), organized a network of camps in the dense forests in the mountainous regions of the Bugey and the lower regions of La Bresse, without creating a fixed camp. This gave

... primacy to isolation from all habitation, but also to sites which permitted hasty retreats.

The enemy would not be able to surprise the Maquis because the views from the mountains were extensive, but some enjoyed this advantage and stayed in the same sites for months, defying their own rules of mobility. Guerrilla warfare practised by the Maquis "created a psychosis of fear within the enemy [...], giving an impression of numbers and strength which was more illusory than real". The Maquis de l'Ain's effectiveness was honed at the training school they opened at Gorges above Mongriffon in June 1943. Captain Romans described the situation:

The watchwords were explicit: no large concentrations of men. No pitched battles. Guerrilla warfare only! We had a few revolvers and some hunting rifles and were reduced to making sketches in order to teach the use of modern weapons. Early in July we received our first Sten machine gun. We kept taking it apart and putting it together until we could do it in record time, Then the gun was passed from one camp to another.

In the control for rural areas, the maquisards, in their role as the hunted, "gradually made the terrain of the hunt unpredictable for the hunters", and eventually dangerous. The Maquis's goal was to destabilize Vichy authority, and they did this by simultaneously making themselves, as well as Vichy authorities, the 'hunters' and the 'hunted'.

During the Allied invasion of Normandy, Operation Overlord, the Maquis and other groups played some role in delaying the German mobilization. The French Resistance (FFI for Forces Françaises de l'Interieur, 'French Forces of the Interior') blew up railroad tracks and repeatedly attacked German Army equipment and garrison trains on their way to the Atlantic coast. Coded messages transmitted over Radio Londres, broadcast from the BBC, alerted the Maquis of the impending D-Day with seemingly meaningless messages such as "the crow will sing three times in the morning" read in a continuous flow over the British airwaves. As Allied troops advanced, the French Resistance rose against the Nazi occupation forces and their garrisons en masse. For example, Nancy Wake's group of 7,000 maquisards was involved in a pitched battle with 22,000 Germans on 20 June 1944. Some Maquis groups took no prisoners so some German soldiers preferred to surrender to Allied soldiers rather than maquisards.

The Allied offensive was slowed and the Germans were able to counterattack in southeast France. On the Vercors Massif, the Maquis du Vercors rose up with some 4,000 soldiers against the German occupiers, but was defeated with 600 casualties.

When General De Gaulle dismissed resistance organizations after the liberation of Paris, many maquisards returned to their homes though many also joined the new French army.

== Equipment ==
Although the Maquis used whatever arms they could get, the groups affiliated with the Free French relied heavily on airdrops of weapons and explosives from the SOE. The SOE parachuted agents in with wireless sets (for radio communication) and dropped containers with various munitions including Sten guns, pencil detonators, plastic explosives, Welrod pistols (a silenced specialized assassination weapon favored by covert operatives) and assorted small arms such as pistols, rifles and sub-machine guns. The Maquis would listen to coded broadcasts by the BBC the night before each supply drop. The information they would receive included the amount of supply boxes that would be dropped and when to light the fire signals that mark the drop zones. The Maquis had to confirm through radio if they received the message in order to lessen the risk of the supplies getting into German hands.

The Maquis also used German weapons captured throughout the occupation; the Mauser 98k rifle and MP 40 submachine gun were very common. The Milice, which was well equipped by Vichy France, was also a target of Maquis actions wherever available.

== Customs ==
The Maquis were clandestine groups which did not wear uniforms, so as to blend in the population. However, over time many started wearing the Basque beret because it was common enough not to arouse suspicion, but distinctive enough to be effective.

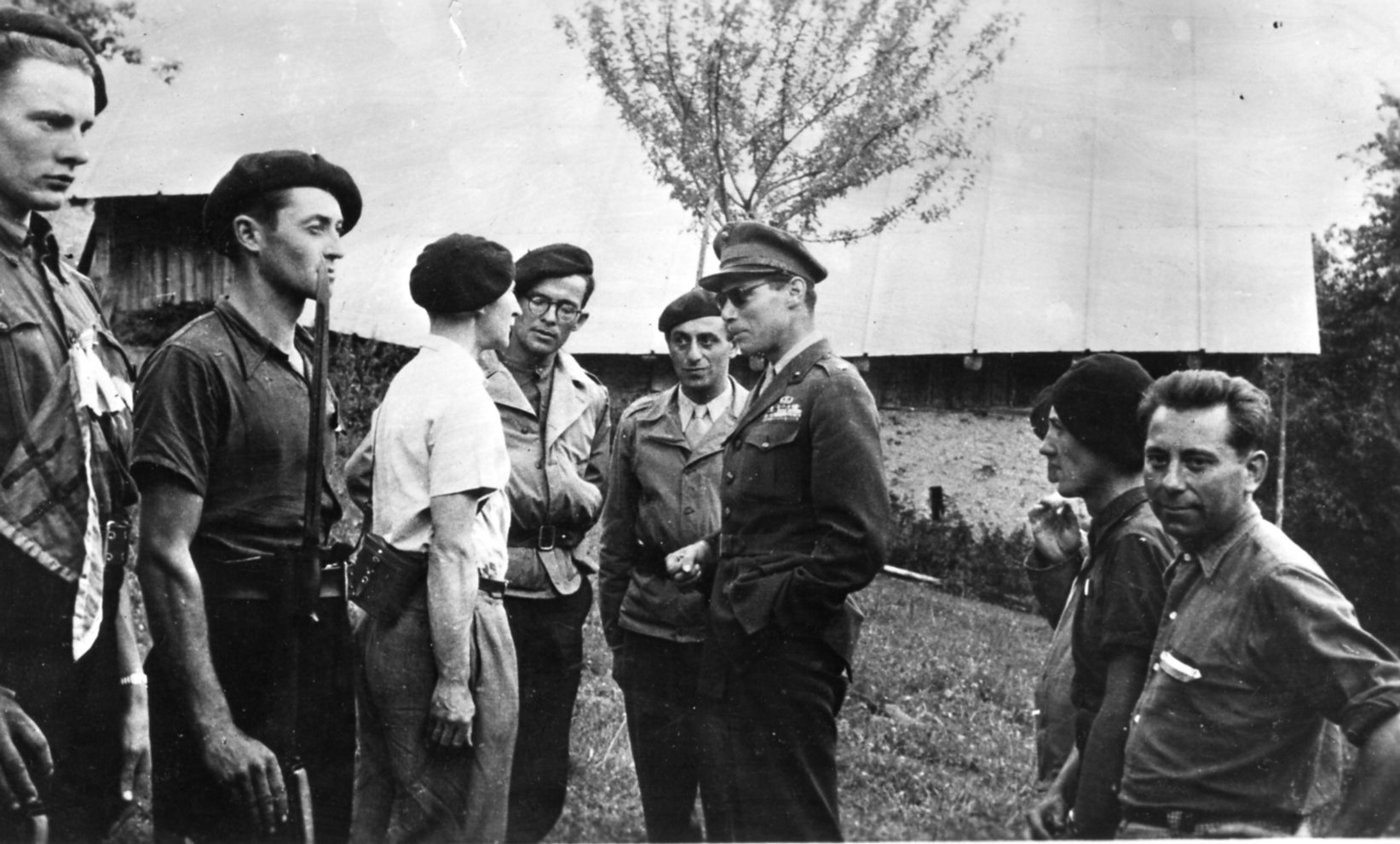
Members of the Maquis resistance group. Notice the berets they are wearing.

In leadership and the more technical aspects of leading a resistance group women were often more involved in the Maquis than men, helping the front line fighters. It was very common for young educated women to be used as couriers from one Maquis group to another. Young women were chosen because they were more inconspicuous than men and could often pass through German checkpoints without being stopped or questioned. Allied operatives working with the Maquis described the women of the Maquis helping of the fighters as "the lifeblood of the resistance, furnishing information, passing instructions, and arranging for food and supplies."

== Controversy ==
After the war, many individuals claimed membership in the Maquis to escape being labeled Nazi collaborators. Operations carried out by the Maquis were often inefficient and meant to grab attention, not destroy key military targets. Allied intelligence received reports that the Maquis would use explosives on targets that did not require them, to make their actions heard. Lack of centralization led to groups taking action to garner attention so that more members would join and they would receive more supplies from the Allied war effort. Some actions taken by these splintered groups were not always in favor of the larger war effort. Another controversy was their harsh punishment of German prisoners and alleged or assumed French collaborators. In one instance recorded by an American OSS agent embedded in the Maquis, a group of fighters had captured three French men accused of collaborating with the Germans and giving them information about the Maquis location. The agent describes one man's punishment saying, "he was tied up in public before he was subsequently beaten and shot." There are also reports of French Maquis units which executed German prisoners.

== Notable maquis ==
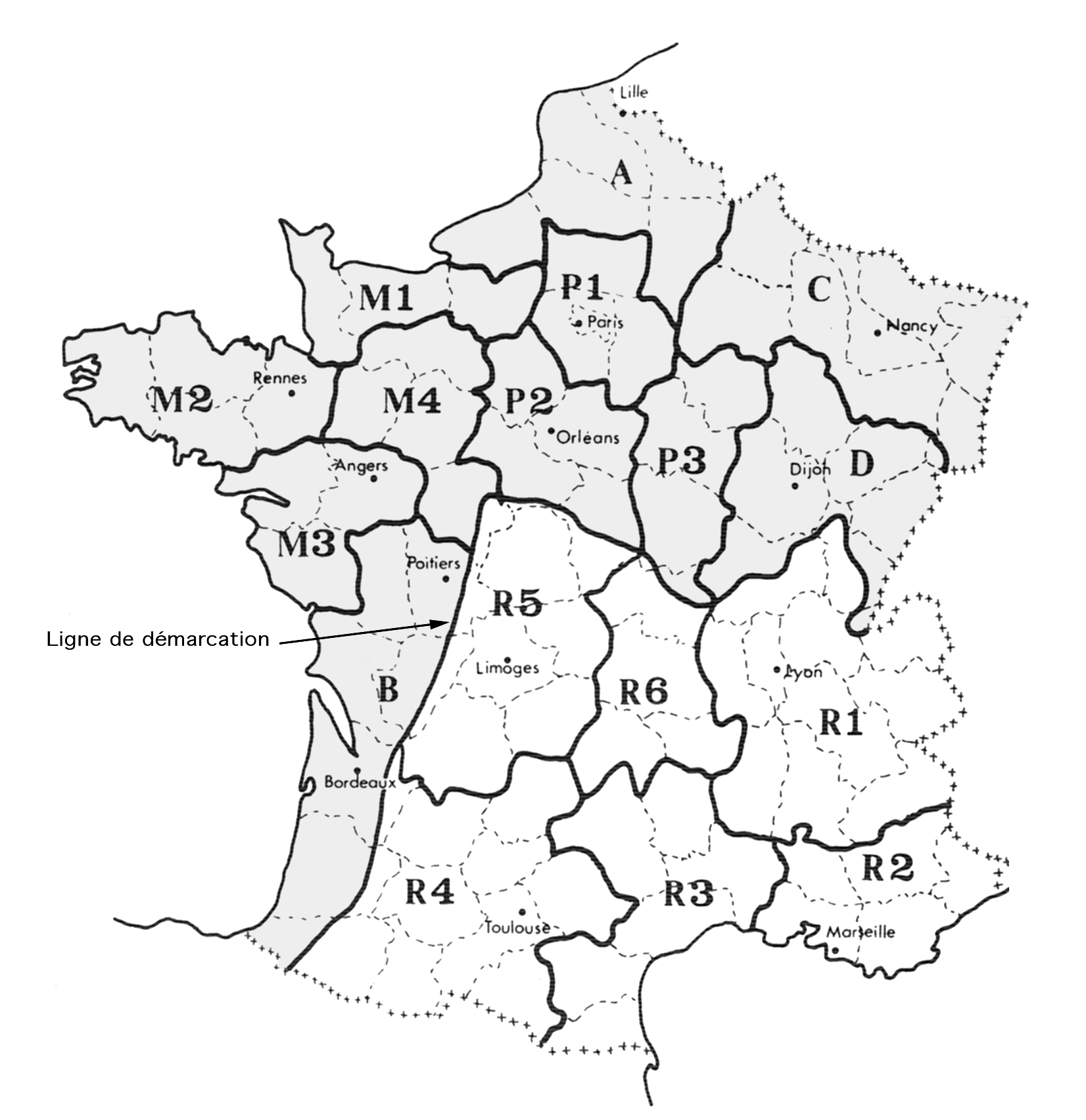
Geographic organization of the French Resistance

- Maquis de l'Ain et du Haut-Jura
- Maquis de Fontjun in the Hérault
- Georges Guingouin, Maquis du Limousin
- Maquis des Glières in the French Alps
- Maquis de l'Oisans in the French Alps
- Maquis du Grésivaudan in the French Alps
- Maquis du Vercors in the French Alps
- Maquis du Limousin in the Massif Central
- Maquis de Lozère directed by the German antifascist Otto Kühne
- Maquis du Mont Mouchet in the Auvergne
- Maquis de Picaussel in the Aude
- Maquis de Saffré in Loire Atlantique
- Maquis de Saint-Marcel in Brittany
- Corps Franc du Sidobre (Tarn)
- Maquis La Tourette in the Hérault created by Jean Bène
- Maquis de Vabre (Tarn)
- Maquis Vallier (Var)
- Maquis des Vosges
- Maquis de Rieumes in the Haute-Garonne
- Corps Franc de la Montagne Noire in the Montagne Noire (Aude, Tarn, Haute-Garonne)
- Mèo Maquis in Indochina, of which Vang Pao was a notable Hmong member operating in Laos. (The Hmong were formerly known by the exonym Meo)

== See also ==
- Chant des Partisans
- Francs-tireurs
- Free France
- Maquis (Star Trek): a resistance group in the Star Trek franchise that named themselves after the World War II fighters.
- Military history of France during World War II
- Organisation de résistance de l'armée
- Resistance during World War II
- Spanish Maquis
- Thiaroye massacre
- Zone libre
- Grenoble's Saint-Bartholomew
- Maquis Ventoux
