= Jean-Joseph Sanfourche =

French artist (1929–2010)

- Born: 25 June 1929; Bordeaux, France
- Died: 13 March 2010 (aged 80); Saint-Léonard-de-Noblat, France
- Known for: Painting, sculpture
- Movement: Art brut

Jean-Joseph Sanfourche (25 June 1929 – 13 March 2010) was a French painter and sculptor associated with art brut. He was a friend of the artist Jean Dubuffet, and with Gaston Chaissac; he had a long correspondence with both artists.

== Biography ==
=== Early years ===
Sanfourche spent his early years in Rochefort, where his father, Arthur Sanfourche, taught him the basics of drawing and painting. His father, a mechanic in the French Navy and later the French Air Force, suffered from pulmonary tuberculosis and was discharged from military service in 1939, at the beginning of the Second World War, but subsequently worked at the Limoges air base.

Sanfourche and his family were arrested by the Gestapo, probably in 1942. His father, a member of the French Resistance, died on an uncertain date, either shot in 1943 or from illness while in detention in 1945. Sanfourche and his mother were released and returned to Limoges. Placed under guardianship, he subsequently studied accounting.

=== Artistic career ===
After the war, Sanfourche entered the École nationale professionnelle in Limoges, where he trained in wood sculpture and industrial drawing. He went to Auvers-sur-Oise, in the Paris suburbs, following in the footsteps of Vincent van Gogh, where he is staying with his younger brother Theo van Gogh (art dealer) and to the area around the clinic in Ivry-sur-Seine where Antonin Artaud was confined.

After spending about twenty years in Paris, he returned to the Limousin and settled in Saint-Léonard-de-Noblat in 1975, where he remained until his death. Passionate about religion, the cathars and the gospels and a member of the confraternity of Saint-Léonard he venerates Léonard the city's founder and patron saint of prisoners and all forms of deliverance at the hermit's tomb where so many illustrious figures came to pray Richard Coeur de Lion, Charles VII of France, Louis XI, Anne of Austria and Eleanor of Austria

He maintained an illustrated correspondence with Jean Dubuffet for almost eighteen years. He also met the painter Gaston Chaissac and Gaëtan Picon, who in 1958 was director of Arts and Letters under André Malraux, then minister of culture of president Charles de Gaulle.

Sanfourche died on 13 March 2010 at the hospital in Saint-Léonard-de-Noblat, at the age of 80. Some of his works were acquired by the singer Tina Turner in 1994.

== Works ==
- Hommage au Facteur Cheval, painting, 50 × 65 cm, 2004.
- Hommage à Raymond Poulidor painting, 70 × 50 cm, 2007.

== Selected exhibitions ==
- 2010: Sanfourche, œuvres d'une vie, Musée des Beaux-Arts, Gaillac.
- 2019: De vous à moi, Galerie Vincent Pécaud, Limoges.
- 2021-2022: Mes rencontres - collection Didier Benesteau, Manas Laval
- 2026: Sanfourche et Paguenaud: Galerie Vincent Pécaud, Limoges

== Collections ==
Sanfourche's works are held in the permanent collections of the Museum de l'Art Brut, Lausanne; and the Musée d’art naïf du Musée du Vieux-Château, Laval, among other institutions.

== See also ==
- Ferdinand Cheval
- Ideal Palace
