= John Gargan (footballer) =

English footballer

Personal information
- Full name: John Gargan
- Date of birth: 6 June 1928
- Place of birth: York, England
- Date of death: 4 February 2007 (aged 78)
- Place of death: Keswick, Cumbria, England
- Position: Half-back

Senior career*
Years	Team	Apps	(Gls)
- Cliftonville
1945–1947	York City	1	(0)
Total		1	(0)
- * Club domestic league appearances and goals

John Gargan (6 June 1928 – 4 February 2007) was an English professional footballer who played as a half-back in the Football League for York City, and in non-League football for Cliftonville.
