= Ferrières-Poussarou =

- Commune
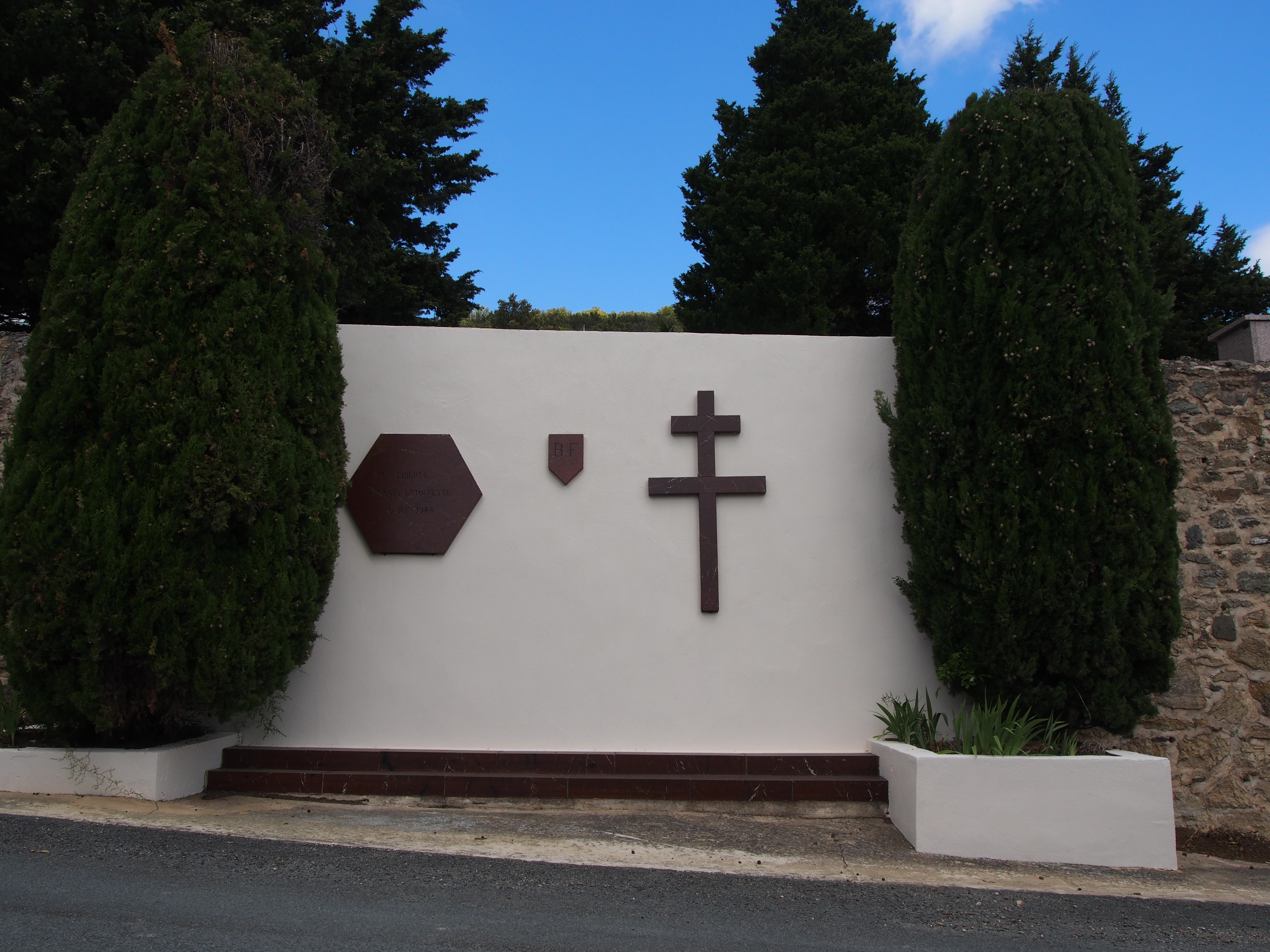
- Monument to the Maquis la Tourette at Ferrières-Poussarou
- Location of Ferrières-Poussarou
- Location within France Location within Occitanie
- Coordinates: 43°29′09″N 2°53′33″E
- Country: France
- Region: Occitania
- Department: Hérault
- Arrondissement: Béziers
- Canton: Saint-Pons-de-Thomières

Government
  - Mayor (2020–2026): Pascale Peytavi
- Area^{1}: 26.01 km^{2} (10.04 sq mi)
- Elevation: 529 m (1,736 ft)
- Highest elevation: 728 m (2,388 ft)
- Lowest elevation: 203 m (666 ft)
- Population (2023): 74
  - Density: 2.8/km^{2} (7.4/sq mi)
- Time zone: UTC+01:00 (CET)
  - Summer (DST): UTC+02:00 (CEST)
- INSEE/Postal code: 34100 /34360
- ^{1} French Land Register data, which excludes lakes, ponds, glaciers > 1 km^{2} (0.386 sq mi or 247 acres) and river estuaries.

Ferrières-Poussarou (French pronunciation: [fɛʁjɛʁ pusaʁu]) is a commune in the Hérault department in southern France.

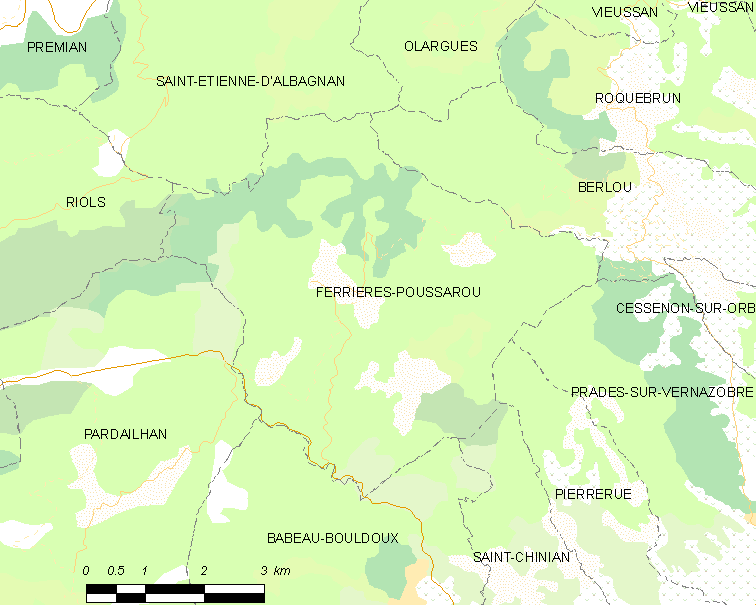
Map

== Population ==
Historical population
Year	Pop.	±% p.a.
1968	40	—
1975	38	−0.73%
1982	35	−1.17%
1990	40	+1.68%
1999	49	+2.28%
2007	60	+2.56%
2012	80	+5.92%
2017	61	−5.28%
2023	74	+3.27%
Source: INSEE

== See also ==
- Communes of the Hérault department
