= Saint-Gilles-les-Forêts =

Commune in Haute-Vienne, France

- Commune
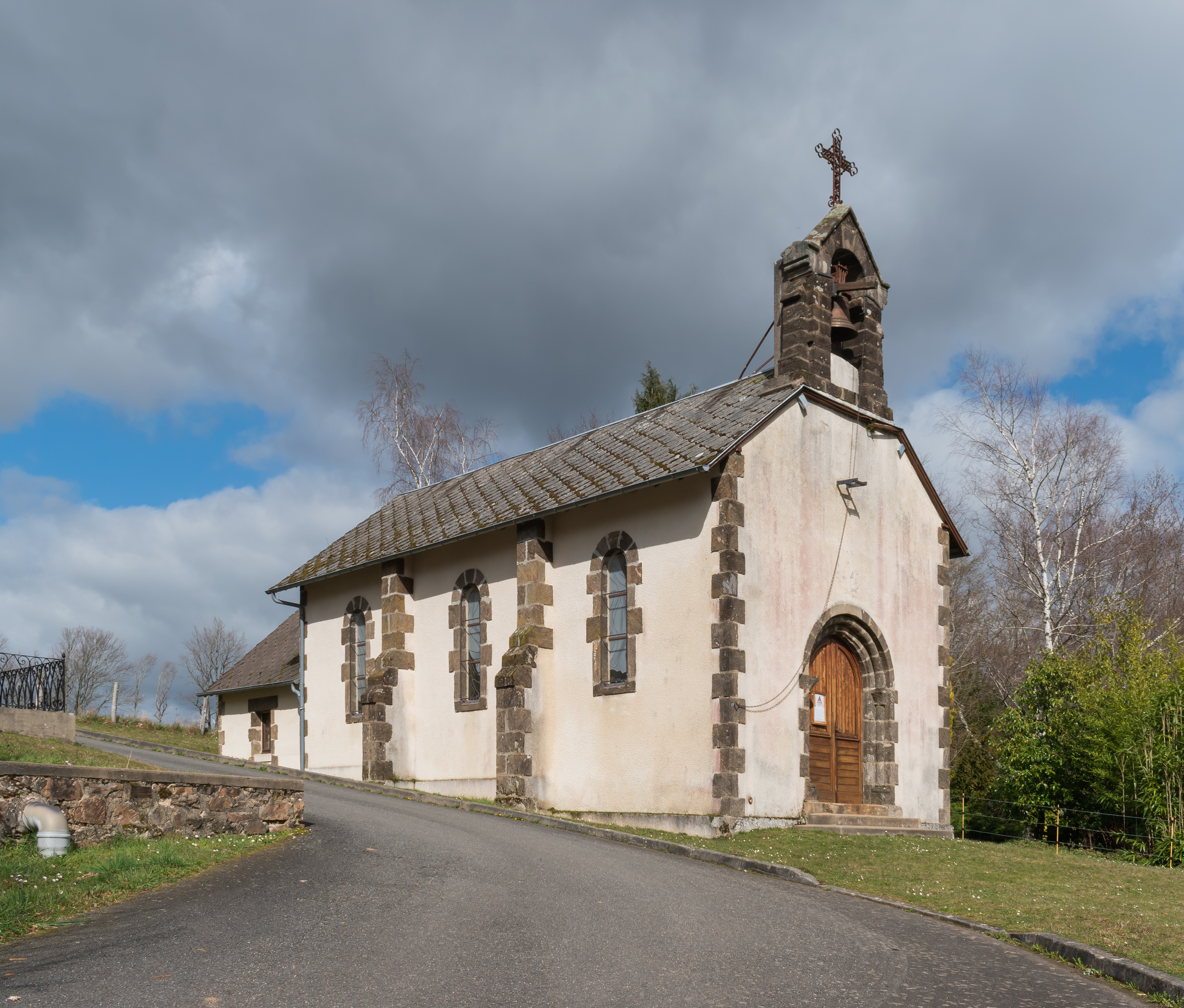
- Saint Giles church in St-Gilles-les-Forêts
- Location of Saint-Gilles-les-Forêts
- Location within France Location within Nouvelle-Aquitaine
- Coordinates: 45°37′47″N 1°40′00″E
- Country: France
- Region: Nouvelle-Aquitaine
- Department: Haute-Vienne
- Arrondissement: Limoges
- Canton: Eymoutiers
- Intercommunality: Briance Combade

Government
  - Mayor (2020–2026): Serge Reineix
- Area^{1}: 8.28 km^{2} (3.20 sq mi)
- Highest elevation: 730 m (2,400 ft)
- Lowest elevation: 420 m (1,380 ft)
- Population (2023): 46
  - Density: 5.6/km^{2} (14/sq mi)
- Time zone: UTC+01:00 (CET)
  - Summer (DST): UTC+02:00 (CEST)
- INSEE/Postal code: 87147 /87130
- ^{1} French Land Register data, which excludes lakes, ponds, glaciers > 1 km^{2} (0.386 sq mi or 247 acres) and river estuaries.

Saint-Gilles-les-Forêts (French pronunciation: [sɛ̃ ʒil le fɔʁɛ]; Occitan: Sent Geris) is a commune in the Haute-Vienne department in the Nouvelle-Aquitaine region in west-central France.

== See also ==
- Communes of the Haute-Vienne department
