= Ambernac =

- Commune
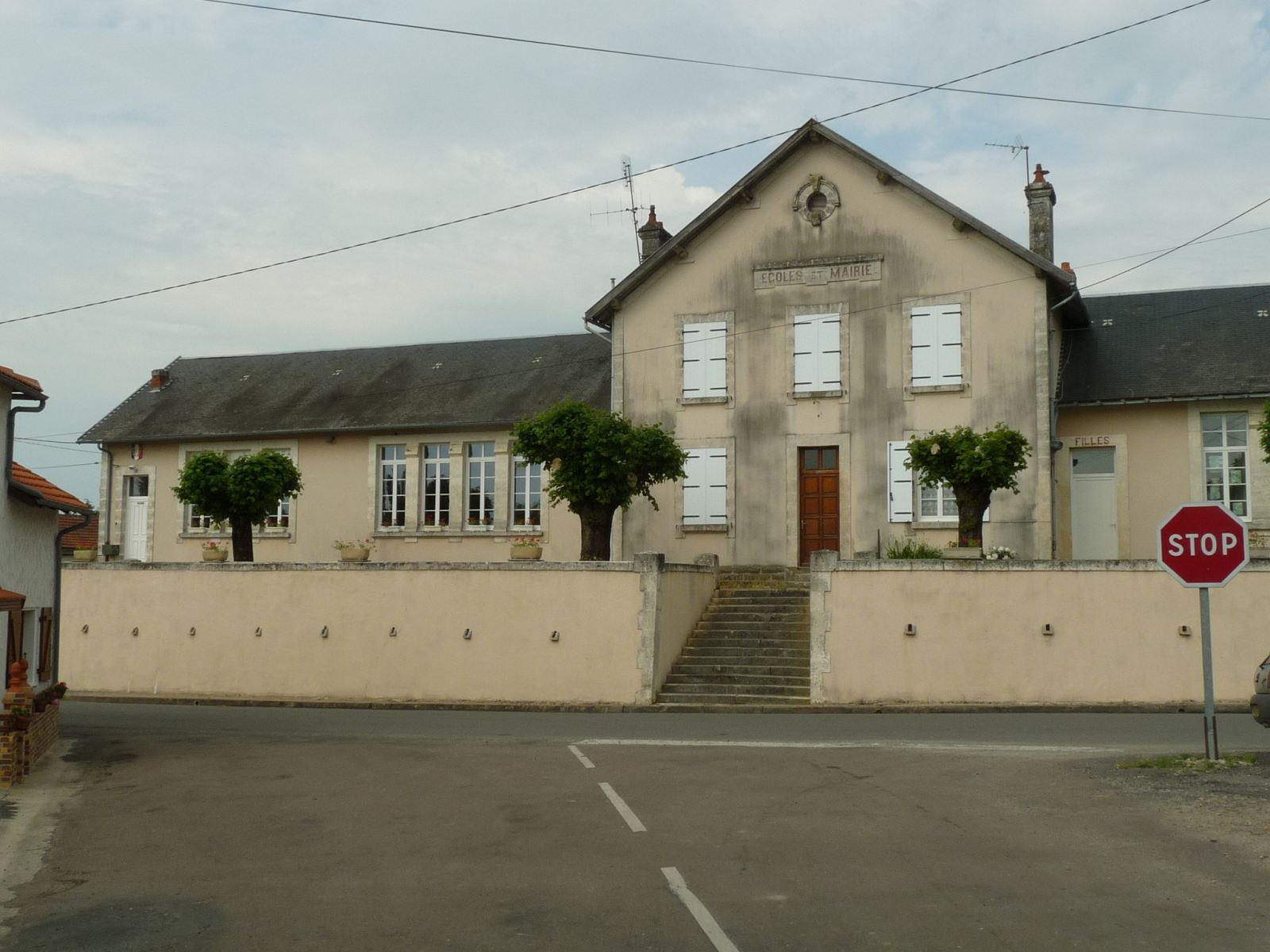
- Town Hall and School
- Location of Ambernac
- Location within France Location within Nouvelle-Aquitaine
- Coordinates: 45°58′52″N 0°32′31″E
- Country: France
- Region: Nouvelle-Aquitaine
- Department: Charente
- Arrondissement: Confolens
- Canton: Charente-Vienne
- Intercommunality: Charente Limousine

Government
  - Mayor (2020–2026): Guy Rougier
- Area^{1}: 30.05 km^{2} (11.60 sq mi)
- Elevation: 200 m (660 ft)
- Highest elevation: 232 m (761 ft)
- Lowest elevation: 147 m (482 ft)
- Population (2023): 381
  - Density: 12.7/km^{2} (32.8/sq mi)
- Time zone: UTC+01:00 (CET)
  - Summer (DST): UTC+02:00 (CEST)
- INSEE/Postal code: 16009 /16490
- ^{1} French Land Register data, which excludes lakes, ponds, glaciers > 1 km^{2} (0.386 sq mi or 247 acres) and river estuaries.

Ambernac (French pronunciation: [ɑ̃bɛʁnak]) is a commune in the Charente department in the Nouvelle-Aquitaine region of south-western France.

== Geography ==
=== Location and access ===
The commune of Ambernac is located in the north-east of the department of Charente on the western edge of the Country of Charente Limousine. It belongs to the Community of communes of Confolentais.

It is located 10 km west of Confolens and 11 km north-east of Saint-Claud. It is also 47 km from Angouleme - the prefecture, 10 km from Champagne-Mouton, 10 km from Roumazières-Loubert, and 6 km from Saint-Laurent-de-Céris.

The D951, the Route d'Angouleme road from Confolens to Gueret and the link road to the Route Central-Europe Atlantic, passes through the south of the commune 4 km south of the village. The village is served by several small regional roads: the D169 from Roumazières to Alloue and Épenède, D170 from Manot in Champagne-Mouton, the D174 to Saint-Laurent-de-Céris, and the D313 east to Confolens.

The nearest railway station is at Roumazières and it is served by the TER service between Angouleme and Limoges.

=== Hamlets and localities ===
The commune has some large hamlets such as Saint-Martin (a former parish) and Montermenoux northeast of the village. There are also smaller hamlets:

- la Grange des Mottes
- le Breuil to the north
- Clermont
- l'Allemandie to the west

=== Geology and relief ===
The commune is geologically in the Aquitaine Basin and the Massif Central.

The valley of the Charente consists of marl of the Lias Group while the plateau of the large western half consists of Tertiary terrain (clay: red in the north, flint clay and alterite in the south), covering a Jurassic limestone bedrock. There is a metal-bearing Jurassic geological fault and there are traces of scoria and lead-silver mine galleries along the Charente.

The east of the commune is on the Limousin plateau - the western part of the Massif Central - which is composed of crystalline and metamorphic rocks - relics of the Variscan orogeny. The valleys of Rouillac and Braillou are carved into granite and areas of sandy clay cover the plateaux.

The relief of the commune is that of a plateau with an average altitude of 190 m; quite hilly as it is traversed from south to north by several valleys including that of the Charente to the west. The highest point of the commune is at an altitude of 232 m located in the Ambouriane Forest in the north-east. The lowest point is 147 m located along the Charente on the northern boundary. The village overlooks the confluence of the Charente and the Braillou and is 185 m above sea level.

=== Hydrography ===
The Charente is still small downstream from Roumazières and upstream from Alloue and it flows north across the west of the commune.

The Braillou (stream) has its source in the town of Manot and traverses the commune to join the Charente on its right bank.

The Rouillac is an intermittent stream which is a tributary of the Braillou at Saint-Martin.

The Ruisseau des Vergnes is a tributary stream of the Charente on its right bank south of the village.

Finally there is the Ruisseau de Flagnat which is the southern boundary of the commune.

There are also short intermittent streams in the many valleys and small ponds due to the clay soil.

=== Climate ===
As for a large part of the department, the climate is oceanic Aquitaine but it is slightly degraded in the vicinity of the Charente Limousine - the climate there is more humid and slightly cooler.

== Toponymy ==
The locality is attested in the forms:

- Andebrinnacum
- Andebrenaco
- Ambronacum'

Albert Dauzat and Charles Rostaing explain the first element Ambern- as the name of a person in Latin: *Ambarrinus (but not substantiated) with the suffix -acum, of the Gallic origin *-āko.

However, although the forms Andebrinnacum and Andebrinnaco may be correct they are not consistent with the proposal of Albert Dauzat and Charles Rostaing, who obviously did not know of them. Three Gallic elements can be identified: ande meaning "below, in front of" cf. "canopy" from *ande-banno or ande - an intensive particle commonly used in place names, such as: Anderitum (Cantal, Anterrieux), Andematunnum (Haute-Marne, Langres), etc. followed by a radical -brenn-, brinn-, of an obscure meaning, but which is identified in Bernac (de Brenaco in 1110), among others. It is followed by the same suffix -acum.

- The hamlet of Breuil takes its name from the Low Latin brogilum of the Gallic origin brogilos meaning "small wood".
- The name of Clermont refers to a hill with a clear view.

== History ==
Andebrenaco was inhabited by the Lemovici. It was subdued by Julius Caesar in 51 BC during his 8th campagne and it was a Gallo-Roman Viguerie. He had a certain importance during the tome of the Merovingians due to the existence of a lead mine at Chéronies and a mint. The village became the medieval seat of an archpriest who benefited from royal largesse.

The old Roman road from Angouleme to Bourges via Argenton passes 1.3 km to the south-east of the town. One portion was found between Luxérat and La Vallade as well as at Chez Pasquet. A milestone with a Roman inscription was discovered in the old cemetery and was probably located on the old road. It can be seen at the Archaeological museum of Angouleme.

Ambernac was part of the former province of Limousin and the Limousin dialect of Occitan is spoken in the commune.

Praisnaud Castle was home of the Babaud family and was mentioned in the 16th century. A lower Puynode Castle would also have existed at that time.

Jean-Baptiste-Barbaud Praisnaud was sub-prefect from 1831 to 1848 during the July Monarchy.

Leonid Barbaud-Praisnaud was an MP in 1848 then was prefect for Charente in 1871.

Antoine-Barbaud Lacroze was an MP and his son Léonide was State Councillor and Senator.

There existed a tile works (present in the Land Registry in 1835) and lime kilns at Chéronnies. There was also a windmill: the "Moulin Ambernac".

In 1935, the actor Noël-Noël bought Praisnaud and he enlisted in the maquis during the Second World War.

== Administration ==
In 1793, Embernac belonged to the canton of Allouë, then in 1801 to that of Champagne-Mouton, then finally in 1802 to the Canton of Confolens-Nord before eventually becoming Ambernac.

List of Successive Mayors

From	To	Name	Party	Position
2001	2008	Hélène Boudesseul		
2008	2014	Marguerite Cadier	SE	Retired in commune
2014	2026	Guy Rougier		

== Population ==
The inhabitants of the commune are known as Ambernacois or Ambernacoises in French.

Historical population
Year	Pop.	±% p.a.
1968	571	—
1975	480	−2.45%
1982	441	−1.20%
1990	430	−0.32%
1999	422	−0.21%
2007	390	−0.98%
2012	400	+0.51%
2017	368	−1.65%
2023	381	+0.58%
Source: INSEE

== Economy ==
Ambernac is primarily an agricultural commune. The commune has a rural holiday cottage.

== Equipment, services and local life ==
=== Education ===
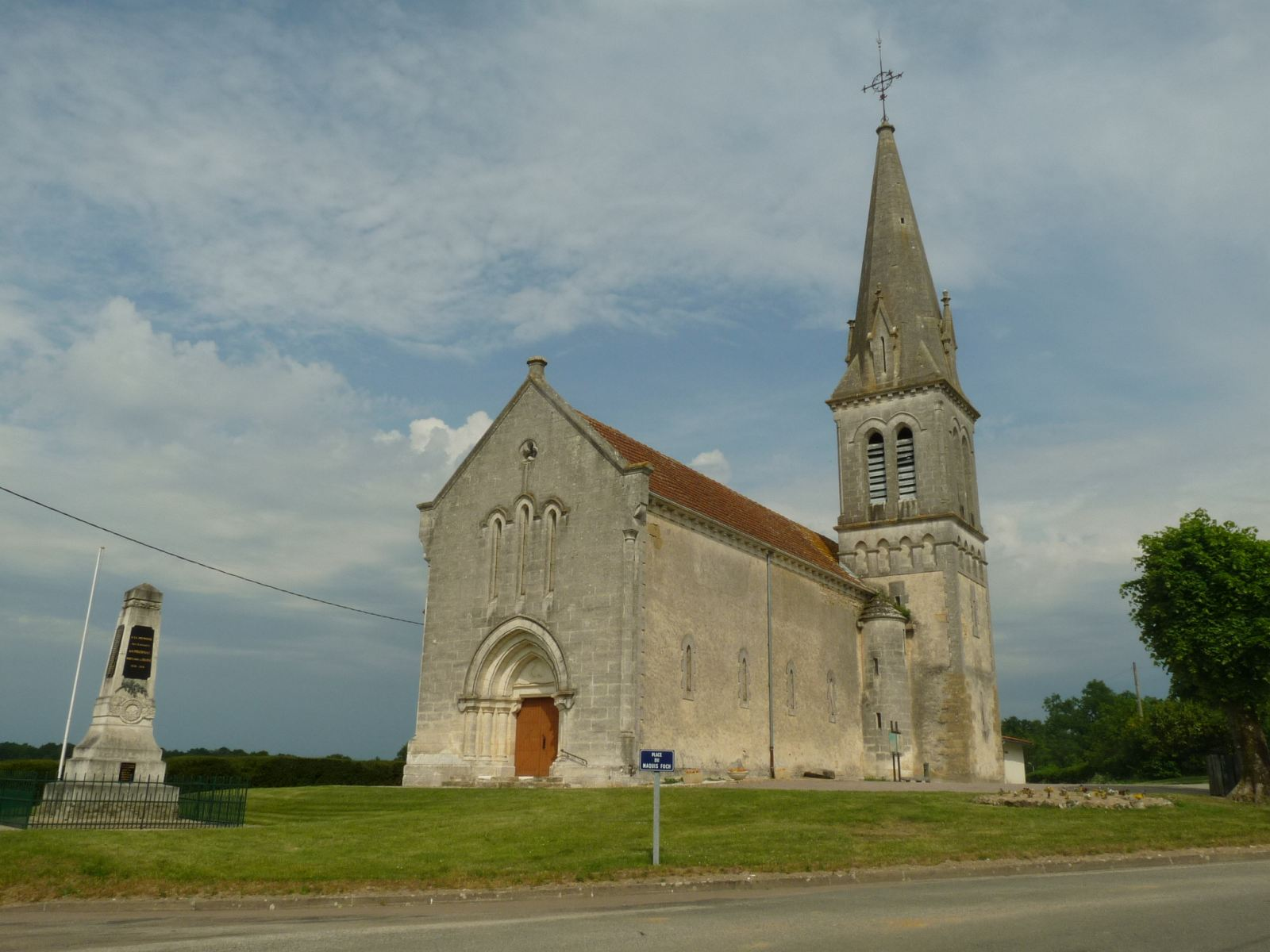
Ambernac church

The school is an inter-communal educational group (RPI) between Alloue, Ambernac, and Benest. Alloue has a primary school (kindergarten and elementary) and both Benest and Ambernac have an elementary school.

=== Other services ===
Other services are in nearby communes and especially in Confolens.

=== Life in Ambernac ===
There are several associations: the Amicale Sportive, Gym Tonic, the Cavaliers du Mas and the Hunting Club with an Old Age Club and a Festival Committee.

A commemoration of the Battle of Ambernac is held every last Sunday of July.

== Sites and monuments ==
=== Civil heritage ===
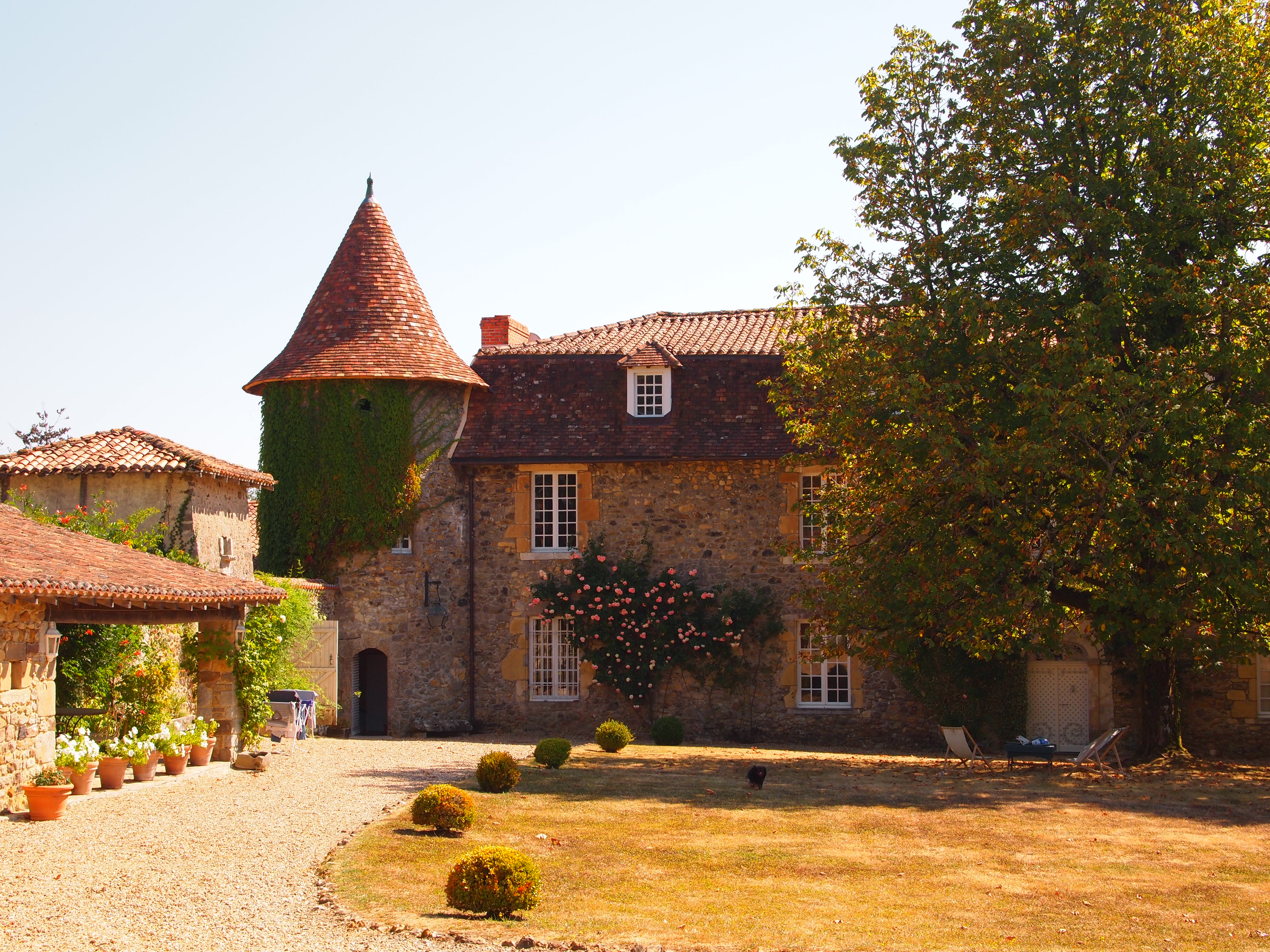
Chateau de Plaisnaud

- The Chateau of Plaisnaud (16th century) is registered as an historical monument. It consists of a rectangular building flanked diagonally by two towers topped with conical roofs. The west tower is a remnant of a building from the 16th century although the tower is from the 19th century. It has an imposing round fuie indicating that the local lord was entitled to high and low justice.
- A Lavoir (Public laundry).

=== Environmental heritage ===
The banks of the Charente are Natura 2000 zones.

There are three hiking trails: Clermont and Ambouriane each 9 km long while Chez Guilloux is 13.5 kilometres.

== Notable people linked to the commune ==
- Noël-Noël was an actor who is buried in the commune cemetery.

== See also ==
- Communes of the Charente department

=== Bibliography ===
- Dujardin V., Moinot É., Ourry Y. (2007) - The Confolentais, between Poitou, Charente and Limousin, Heritage Images, No. 243, Geste éditions, 2007. (in French)
