= Alloue =

- Commune

- Coat of arms
- Location of Alloue
- Location within France Location within Nouvelle-Aquitaine
- Coordinates: 46°01′38″N 0°30′57″E
- Country: France
- Region: Nouvelle-Aquitaine
- Department: Charente
- Arrondissement: Confolens
- Canton: Charente-Bonnieure
- Intercommunality: Charente Limousine

Government
  - Mayor (2020–2026): Nathalie Landrevie
- Area^{1}: 46.54 km^{2} (17.97 sq mi)
- Elevation: 116 m (381 ft)
- Highest elevation: 231 m (758 ft)
- Lowest elevation: 136 m (446 ft)
- Population (2023): 491
  - Density: 10.6/km^{2} (27.3/sq mi)
- Time zone: UTC+01:00 (CET)
  - Summer (DST): UTC+02:00 (CEST)
- INSEE/Postal code: 16007 /16490
- ^{1} French Land Register data, which excludes lakes, ponds, glaciers > 1 km^{2} (0.386 sq mi or 247 acres) and river estuaries.

Alloue (French pronunciation: [alu]; Occitan: Aloa) is a commune in the Charente department in the Nouvelle-Aquitaine region of southwestern France.

== Geography ==
=== Location and access ===
Alloue is a commune located in the north-east of the Charente at the edge of the Charente Limousine and Ruffécois regions, 5 km south of the boundary of the department of Vienne. It belongs to the Community of communes of Confolentais.

The commune is 9 km east of Champagne-Mouton, and 12 km west of Confolens. The main road that runs through the village and the commune from east to west is the D740, the former national road from Confolens in Niort via Ruffec (24 km) and via Champagne-Mouton. Angoulême is 50 km to the south-west and Limoges a similar distance to the south-east. Alloue is also 15 km north of Saint-Claud and Roumazières-Loubert.

Other minor departmental minor roads run through the commune including the D169 south to Roumazières-Loubert via Ambernac, the D171 towards Benest in the west, the D312 heading north-west, the D169 north to Épenède and Pressac, the D309 to Ansac-sur-Vienne in the south-east, and the D313 heading towards Manot in the south-east.

=== Hamlets and localities ===
The commune has many small hamlets:

- Lasfont and les Bréchevaux on the main D740 to Confolens
- Les Essarts and Les Repaires to the southeast along the D309
- Villemier and La Châtre on the D313
- Massignac and its castle
- le Breuil south of the town on the right bank of the Charente
- Beaumont
- l'Houmède
- La Renaudie
- La Lande to the south on the left bank
- Le Chevrier
- Le Grand Molan
- Le Petit Molan
- Chez Paire and Rioumort to the west
- Masmayoux
- Fontbeau
- Chez Taury to the north

Chez Pasquet borders the town to the north as does La Cantine to the south of the town on the left bank of the river.

=== Geology ===
The land is composed of marl limestone dating from the Early Jurassic period in the valley and deposits of Clay from the Tertiary period on the slopes.

The old Galena (lead and silver) mine at Beaumont was composed of veins on a fault which follows the valley of the Charente to Ambernac until it nearly reaches Asnois (Vienne) and passes through Alloue. The mine consists of tunnels dug into the rock.

=== Relief ===
The relief of the commune is that of a plateau with an average altitude of 180 m, traversed from south to north by the valley of the Charente. The highest point is at an altitude of 231 m which is located in the Bois de Signes (Signes Forest) on the eastern edge of the commune. The lowest point is 136 m which is located along the Charente on the north-western boundary. The village is in the valley and on the right bank of the river and is 145 m above sea level.

=== Hydrography ===
The Charente flows through the commune from south to north. The part in the commune is downstream of Roumazières and upstream of the Vienne department where the river makes an incursion before returning to Ruffec and Angoulême.

The Transon, a tributary on the right side of the Charente joining at Chatain (Vienne), rises in the south-east of the commune and along its eastern boundary.

The Charente has many small tributary streams rising in the commune such as the Ruisseau de la Forêt (Forest Stream) which flows in the northwest.

The Clain, a tributary of the Vienne passing Poitiers, rises in the commune of Hiesse 50 m from the communal boundary at Beau Clain. The watershed line between the basins of the Charente and the Loire crosses the eastern edge of the commune.

The commune of Alloue also has many ponds and small water reservoirs, mainly in the south-west.

=== Dialects ===
The town is in the Occitan area of Marchois in contact with the Limousin dialect and marks the boundary with the Poitevin langue d'oïl (to the northwest)

=== Climate ===
As for a large part of the west of the department, the climate is an Aquitaine Oceanic climate but it is slightly degraded near the Charente Limousine area where the climate is more humid and slightly cooler.

=== Toponymy ===
The name of the commune Alloue is said to come from the Gallic word alauda meaning lark.

The hamlet of Beaumont comes from the French beau mont which means "beautiful hill".

Les Essarts was designated in the Middle Ages to be cleared of forest.

The hamlet of Fontbeau may take its name from the Latin fons or fontis meaning "source" and bellus meaning "handsome". It can therefore mean "beautiful spring" but it is more likely from the Occitan font bou (fons bovis in Latin) to the French fontaine de boeuf (fountain of beef).

For the hamlet of Masmayoux the origin is from the Latin major meaning "bigger" and mansus which had become mas by the Middle Ages and which designated an agricultural field. It can therefore lead to the meaning "large farm".

Les Repaires comes from the old French repair meaning house or fortified castle.

== History ==
Tools, particularly polished axes, and a tumulus have been found in Caillauds which attests to the antiquity of occupation of the area.

The old silver-lead mine in the commune has been worked since the Gallic era.

A Roman road passed by Alloue and its remains are visible at a place called les Repaires

Alloue formed part of the province of Poitou as with most towns west of Confolentais and the Occitan language Limousin dialect was widely spoken under the Ancien Régime.

In 783 the name Alloue was mentioned when Roger, Count of Limoges gave land at Alloue for the creation of the Charroux Abbey. On 23 April 1121, Guillaume I, Bishop of Poitiers, donated the Alloue Church to the Abbey of Charroux. This Benedictine priory which had prior rights of low, medium and high justice was plundered in 1356 and then restored. In the 16th century the priory had four occupants and the prior. From a survey in 1547, the Priory of Alloue had twenty houses in the village and about 125 tenements in the parish and neighbouring parishes. On a 1740 plan they were shown next to the church with farm buildings and gardens. The priory closed in 1781. It was sold as national property during the Revolution.

There were four fiefs and castles on the territory:

The Fief of Geuche was mentioned in 1396, when it belonged to Perrenot La Lande. In the 17th century it was the property of the Gracieux family and was sold as national property during the Revolution.

The manoir de l'Age for which in 1399 Guy de l'Aage Landri, squire, made an admission to Aimar, the Abbot of Charroux that his "accommodation of l'Age de Volude in Alloue" . The word volude means a small valley and the word age a fortified enclosure. The Manoir de l'Age was successively occupied by the families Green de Marsault, L'Aage, and Verdilhac.

The Castle of Massignac in the 15th century belonged to the Tizon family then in the 16th century to the Barbarin family, passing to the Regnaud family, and finally by marriage to the Guiot family before being sold as national property during the Revolution.

A mill that existed in the north was destroyed.

The lordship of La Vergne had the rank of Châtelainie.

=== Heraldry ===
Arms of Alloue	Blazon: Sable, two chevrons Or in chief two lozenges azure bordure in Or.

== Administration ==
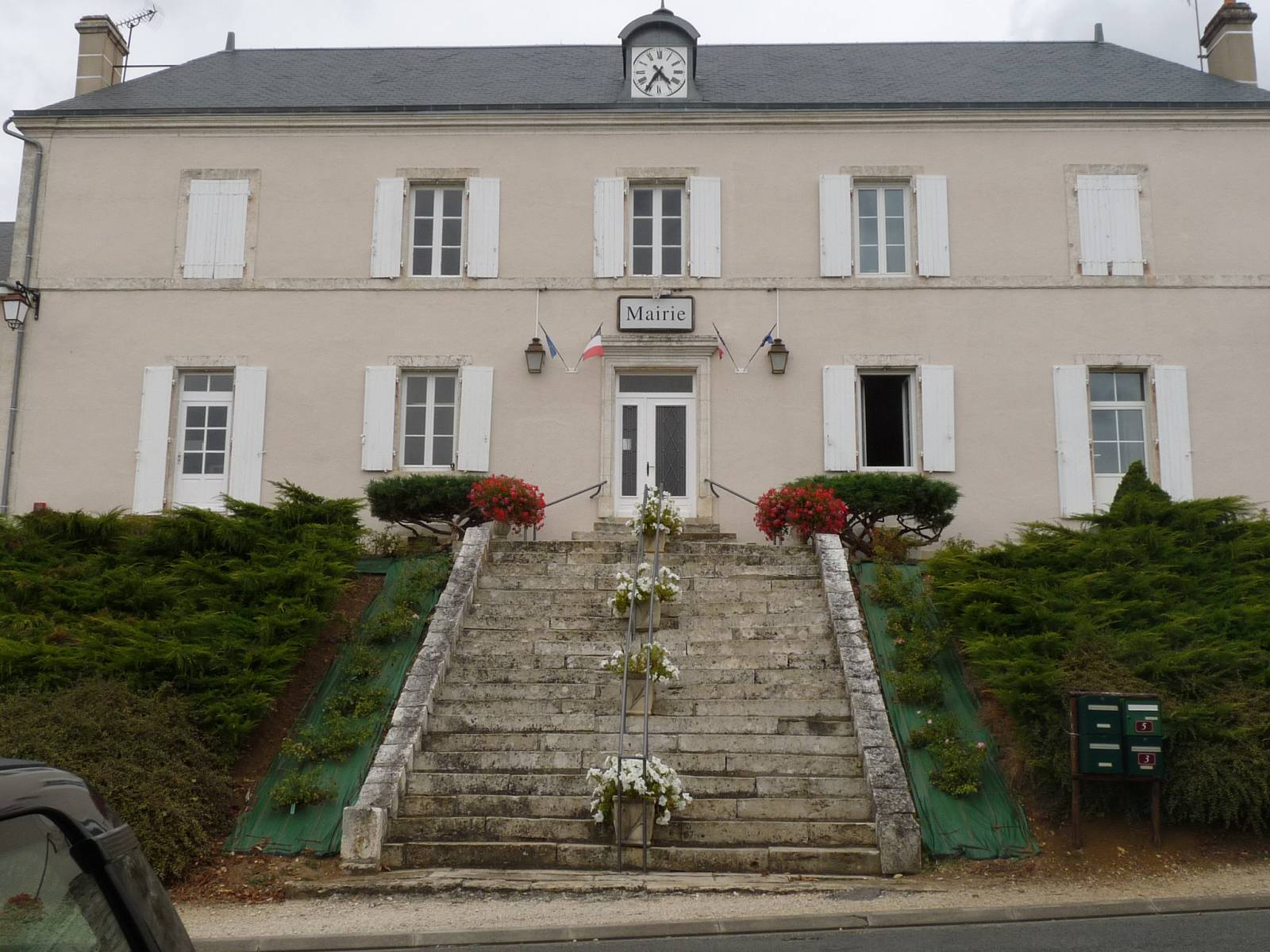
Town Hall at Alloue

When the town was founded in 1793 it was named Allouë and it was the capital of the canton. In 1801, still with the same name, it belonged to the canton of Champagne-Mouton and it was only later that it became Alloue.

List of Successive Mayors of Alloue

From	To	Name	Party	Position
		Roger Brunet		
1995	2001	Lucien Simonneau		
2001	2008	Raymond Beaussand		
2008	2014	Nathalie Vignaud-Landrevie	ind.	Secretary of Insurance Agency
2014	2020	Jean-Jacques Catrain		
2020	2026	Nathalie Landrevie		

== Population ==
The inhabitants of the commune are known as Allousiens or Allousiennes in French. With 1720 inhabitants in 1793, the commune has been the victim of a slow erosion that accelerated during the 20th century. The commune has lost 70% of its population in two centuries.

Historical population
Year	Pop.	±% p.a.
1968	818	—
1975	758	−1.08%
1982	649	−2.19%
1990	599	−1.00%
1999	531	−1.33%
2007	512	−0.45%
2012	526	+0.54%
2017	468	−2.31%
2023	491	+0.80%
Source: INSEE

== Economy ==
The lead mine was worked since the Gallic era until after the abbot Michon. It was operated by a Sir Villain in the 18th century and in 1818, according to Quenot, there were a dozen open pits. Then the mine was operated by several concessionaires without much success due to the poor quality of the ore and the difficulty of separating the galena from the several intertwined minerals. A company was founded in 1821 then abandoned the mine in 1829, recovered, then abandoned it again and, after a last attempt in 1930, it was finally closed due to insufficient profitability.

In the 19th century four mills were in operation. *one, a wheat mill, became an oil and dairy factory then the Charente was diverted.

- The La Lande mill was a wheat mill dating from the 18th century
- two Mills of la Roche but the second did not exist in 1835

Currently activity in the commune is mainly agricultural.

Shops include a baker, a restaurant and an agricultural parts merchant.

There are also a hairdresser, a bricklayer, an electrician/plumber/heating merchant, a bicycle repair shop and a landscaper.

== Facilities, services and local life ==
=== Education ===
The school is a regroupment school covering Alloue, Ambernac, and Benest. Alloue has a primary school (both kindergarten and elementary); Benest and Ambernac have an elementary school.

=== Other services ===
There is a post office and there are other services in the surrounding communities, mainly Confolens.

== Sites and Monuments ==
=== Civil heritage ===
There are more than 200 sites in the commune that are registered as historical monuments with the majority of sites Houses or Farmhouses. A selection of the more interesting sites are described below.

- There are traces of a Roman road east of the town near the place called Les Repaires.
- A small masoned Irrigation Canal (19th century) is located on the edge of the Maquis-Foch Square dating from the 19th century which allows a small stream to flow into the Charente. A slab connects the two rivers.
- The Chateau of Massignac (15th century) has large corner towers and framed windows and with mouldings typical of a 15th-century castle. The circular corner towers are square inside and equipped with several archers' loopholes. It was redesigned in 1861 with installation of a stairway.
- Gueuche Chateau has retained its 14th-century structure although a large part of the walls were rebuilt in 1870 – which date is inscribed on the lintel of the door. It is rectangular in shape with a vaulted cellar in the basement, one floor with an attic covered with a high hip roof with flat tiles. The tower with a staircase is adjoining on the southeast side topped with a conical slate roof with loopholes for archers. Outbuildings were added in the 19th century and are partly shown on the cadastral map of 1835 (the barn was enlarged at the end of the 19th century).
- L'Age Manor (15th century) was originally composed of a rectangular enclosure with battlements with four circular towers and a drawbridge dating from the 15th century and lodgings built at the end of the 16th century. All that remains of the enclosure is the two towers located on the southwest and southeast sides. The towers are pierced by four gunnery loopholes. The wall was crowned with a parapet and battlements of which there remains the consoles at the level of the south-west tower. The lodgings have a rectangular plan with an attic floor and circular stairs to the tower, half-completed, in the middle of the facade pierced with small windows and an archer loophole. On the cadastral map of 1835, the moat and the four towers were still present and there was a building that was against the outer wall to the southwest, an extension of the current vaulted room, which connected the two corner towers. On old views of the early 20th century, the tower in the north-west and the walkway in front of the lodgings are still visible.
- Beau-Chêne Manor (1666) consists of buildings contained within four towers, the oldest of which is the south-east tower which may date from the 15th century. The coat of arms of De Lage is found on the walls of the courtyard of the lodgings and an inscription "F.P.P.D.Lage 1656" is inserted in the wall over a raven (but probably not in its original location) in an outside staircase. The north wing of the castle was demolished in 1873. The De Lage family, lords of Beauchesne, a branch of the family of De Lage de Volude, owned the manor until the late 17th century, then the Gracieux family held it until the Revolution.
- The Logis de la Vergne (15th century) is located 300 m south of the town next to the Charente. The first lords of this manor were known as GUYOT. Marc Guyot du Repaire inherited the lordship of the Chateau de La Vergne in 1679. The Guyot du Repaire family owned the lordship and the estates and land of La Vergne till the mid 19th century. The castle was bought by the famous actress María Casares in the 1960s. At her death in 1996, the estate was bequeathed to the local municipality. Since then the castle now hosts a cultural project and is a residence and place of exchange, training for writers, actors and theatre directors. The library and the whole house became a Registered monument on 12 December 2002.
Logis de la Vergne

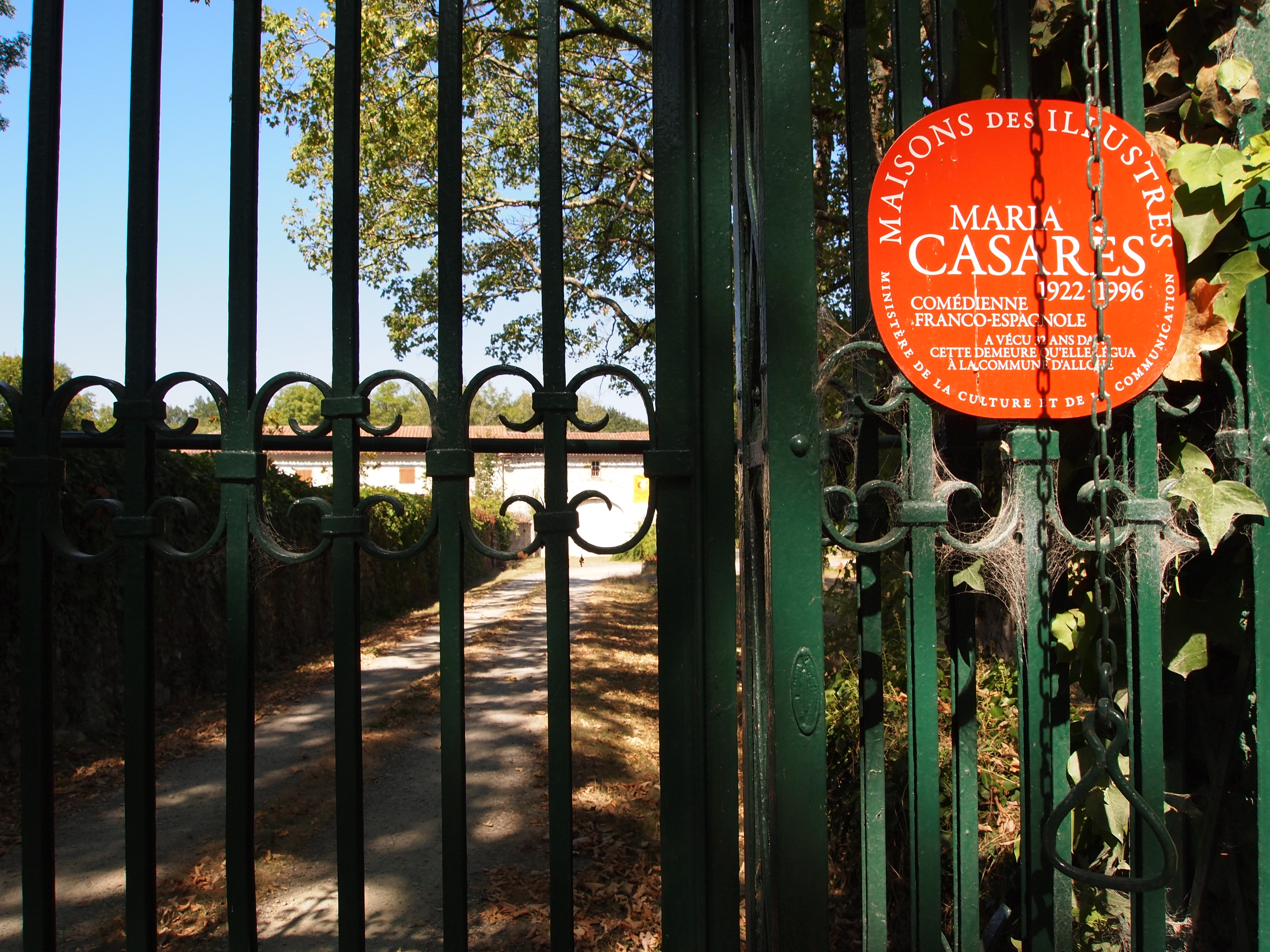
Gate of the Logis de la Vergne

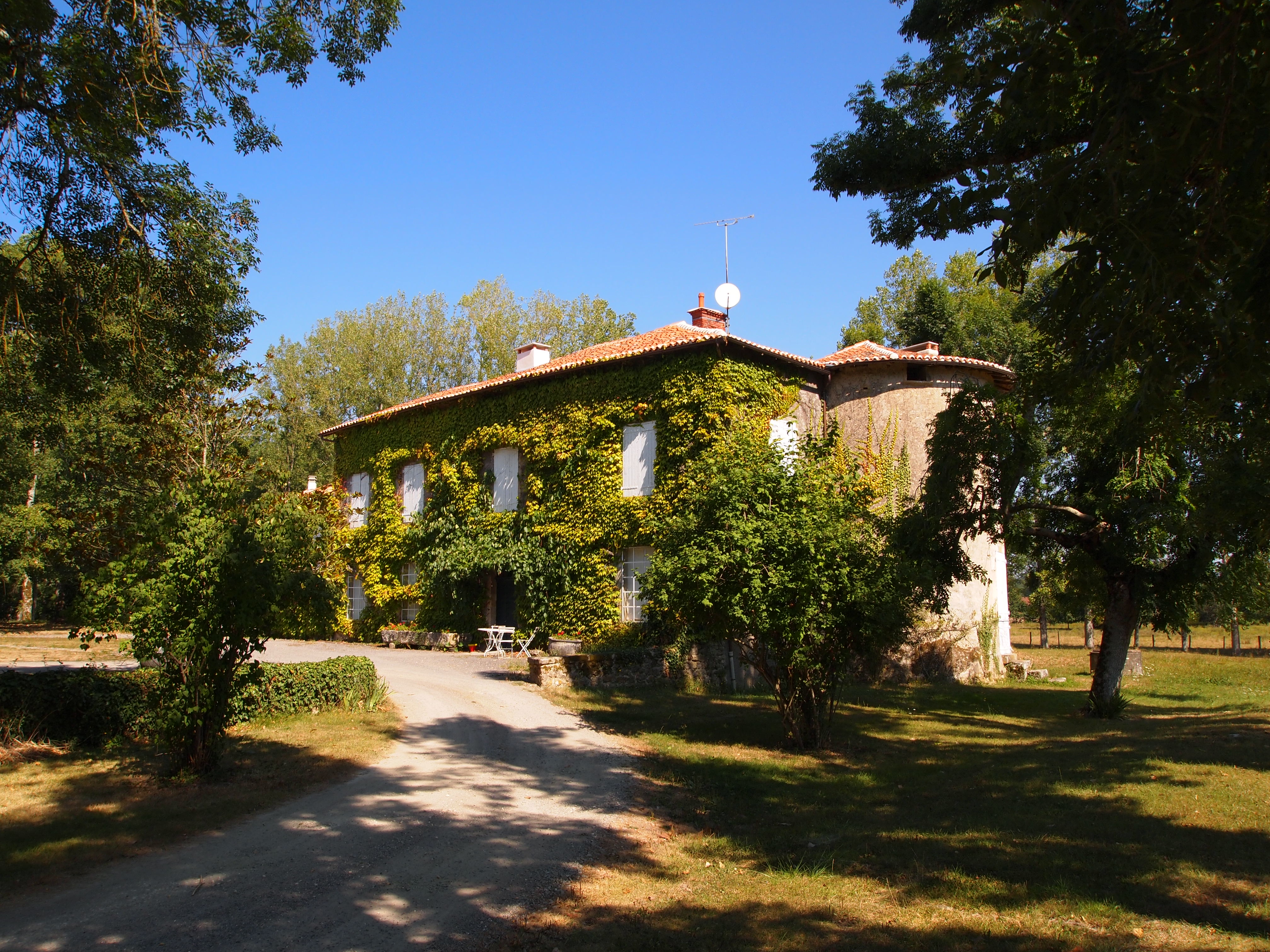
Logis de la Vergne

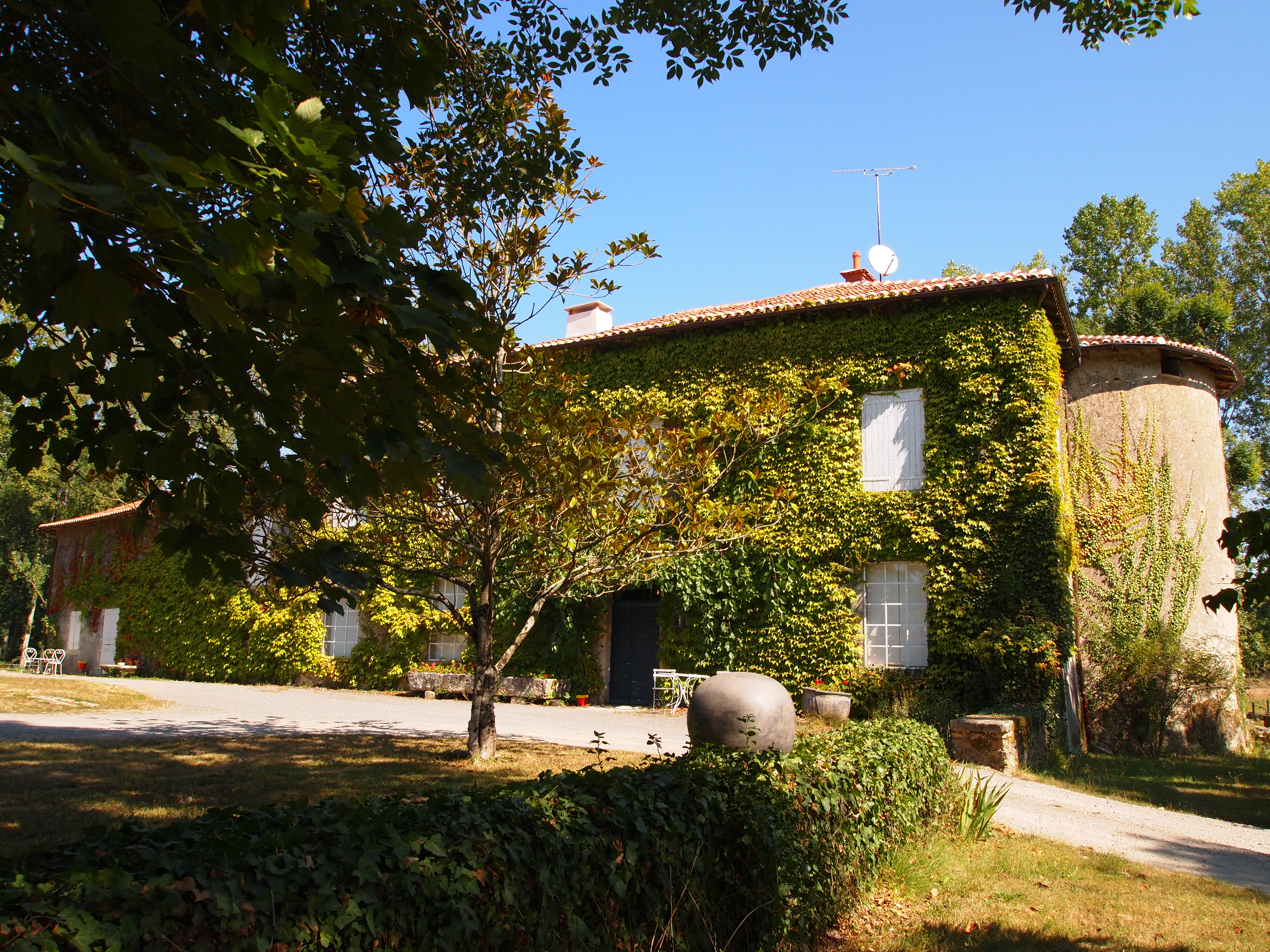
Logis de la Vegne
- The Pavillon Manor (17th century) was indicated as a lordship on the 18th century Cassini map but the house has since been greatly altered. The house faces the church and was restored in the 19th century. This mansion has an austere facade but has been uniquely decorated internally using a French wallpaper manufactured by Jean Zuber between 1834 and 1836. These wallpapers are decorated with pictures such as: "View of North America" or "Helvéthie".
- The Rioumort Bridge (Middle Ages) was a medieval bridge whose deck was rebuilt between 1895 and 1898.
- The Pont-Neuf (New Bridge) at the western entrance of Alloue dates to 1741.

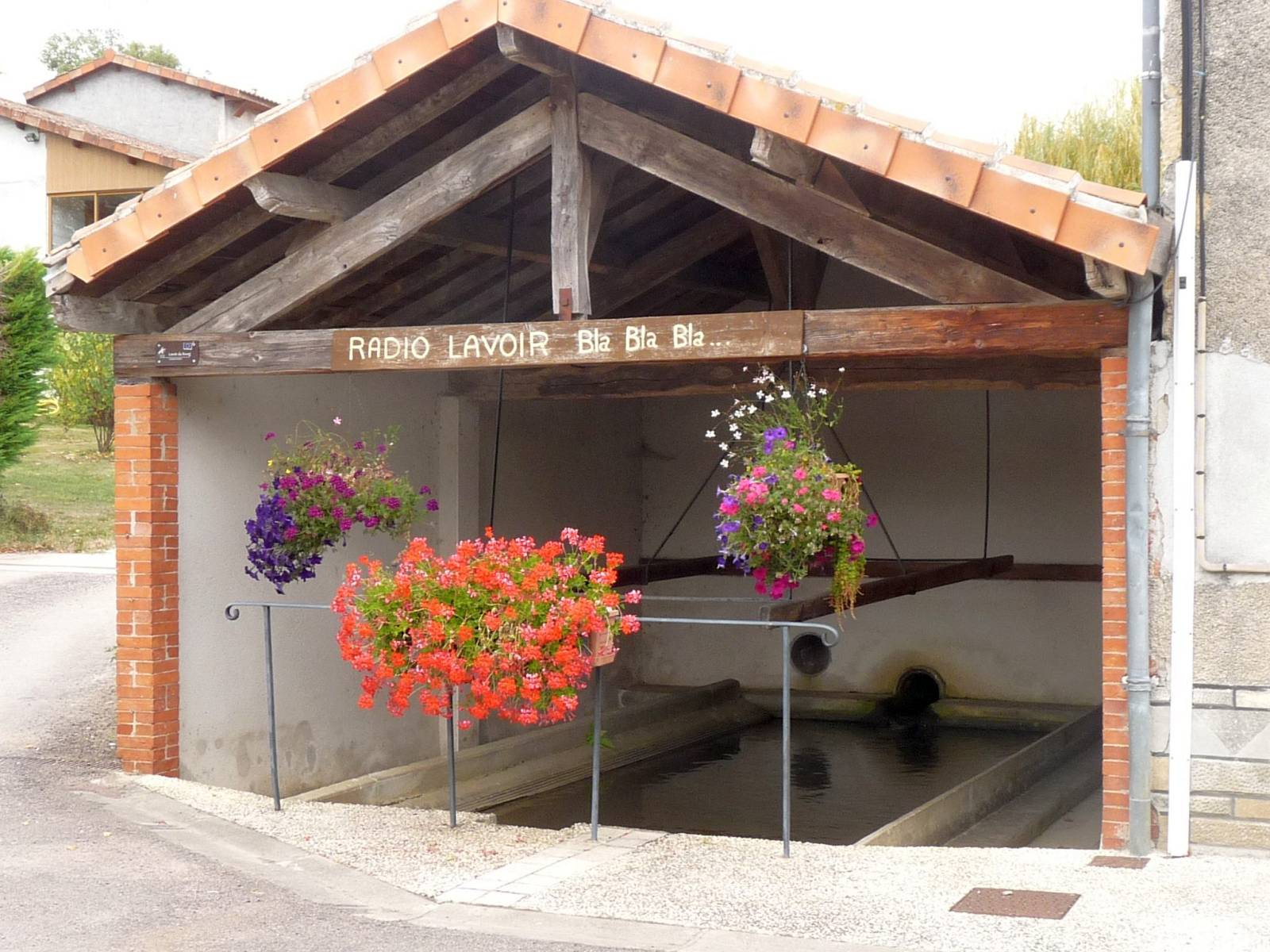
The covered Lavoir or public laundry

- The covered Lavoir at Alloue consists of a basin surrounded by stone slabs.

There are also old Lavoirs at Masmayoux where the well is an uncovered rectangular basin fed by a spring that emerges from a cube of masonry and stone rubble and near Lasfond which also has an uncovered basin.

- The Chez Paire Fountain (19th century) is equipped with a pump.
- The Rioumort Fountain (19th century) is covered by a dome and rubble after a legend that it would bring health and prosperity.

=== Religious Heritage ===
The Parish Church of Notre-Dame (12th century) is registered as an historical monument. The church contains two items that are registered as historical objects:

- A Statue: Virgin and Child (18th century) in wood painted in polychrome 1.10 metres high
- An altar (17th century) in Cuir de Cordoue of the 17th century 1.50m high on a base 0.60m high.

The Church of Notre Dame

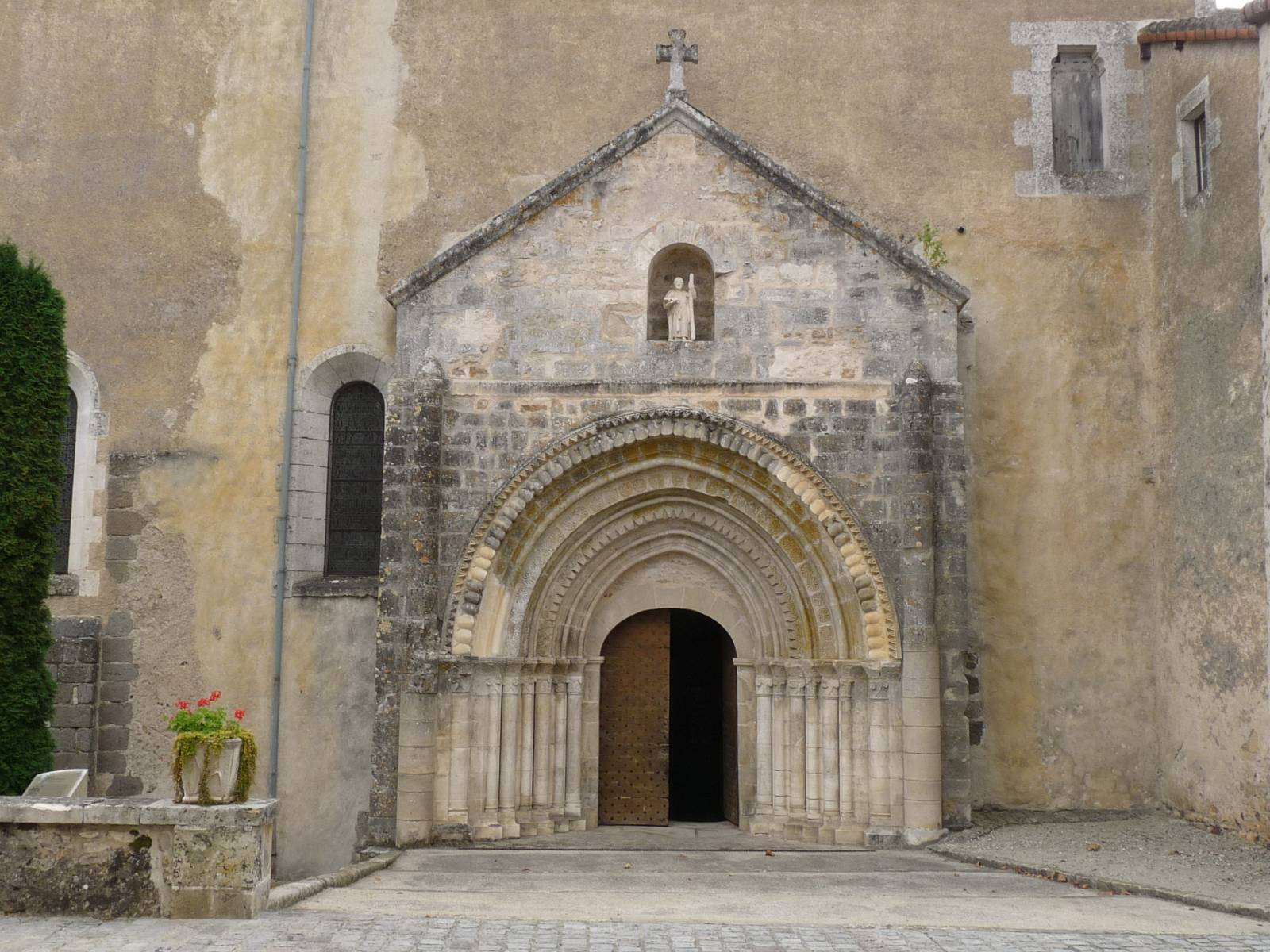
The Entry

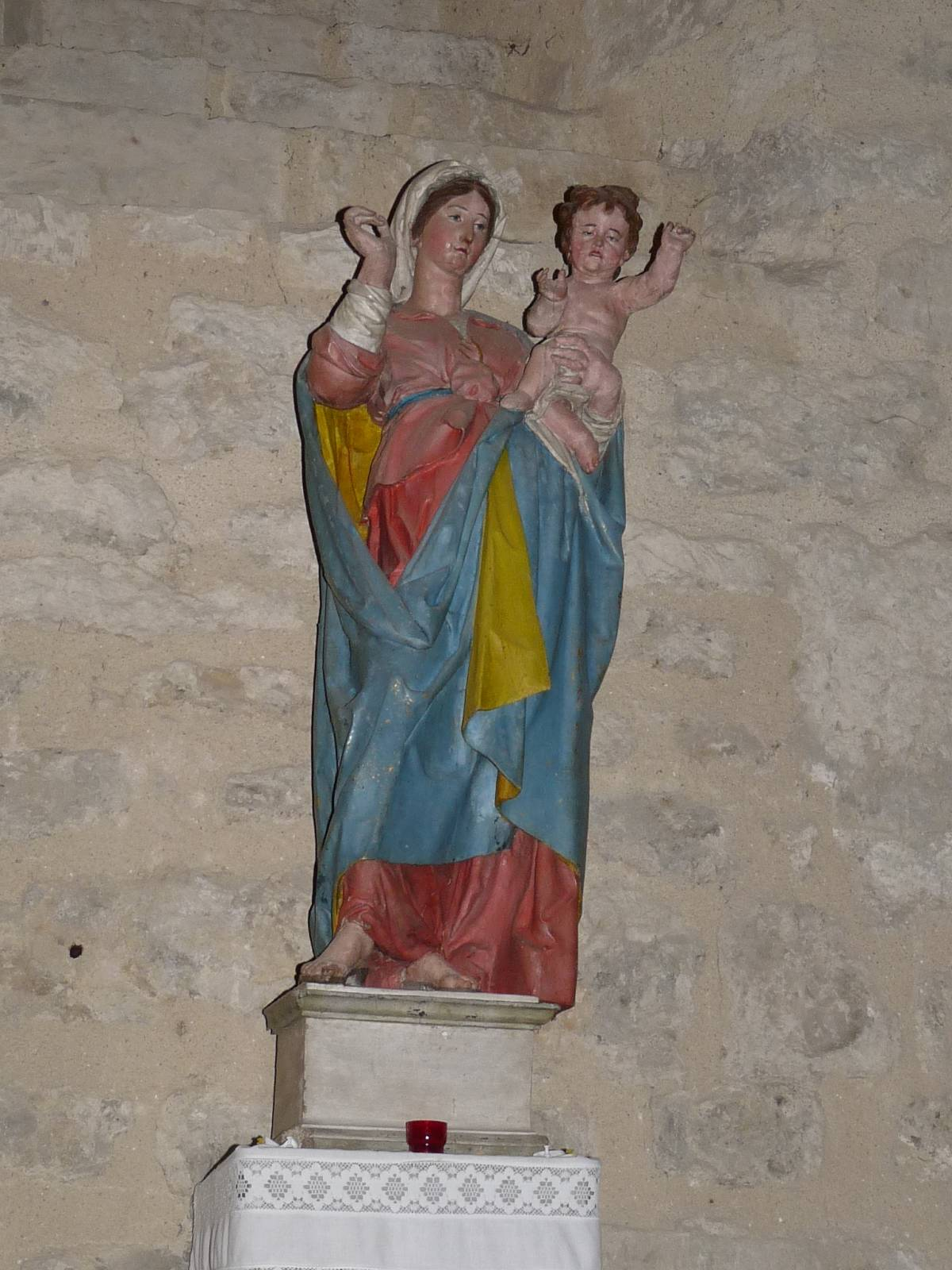
The Virgin and Child

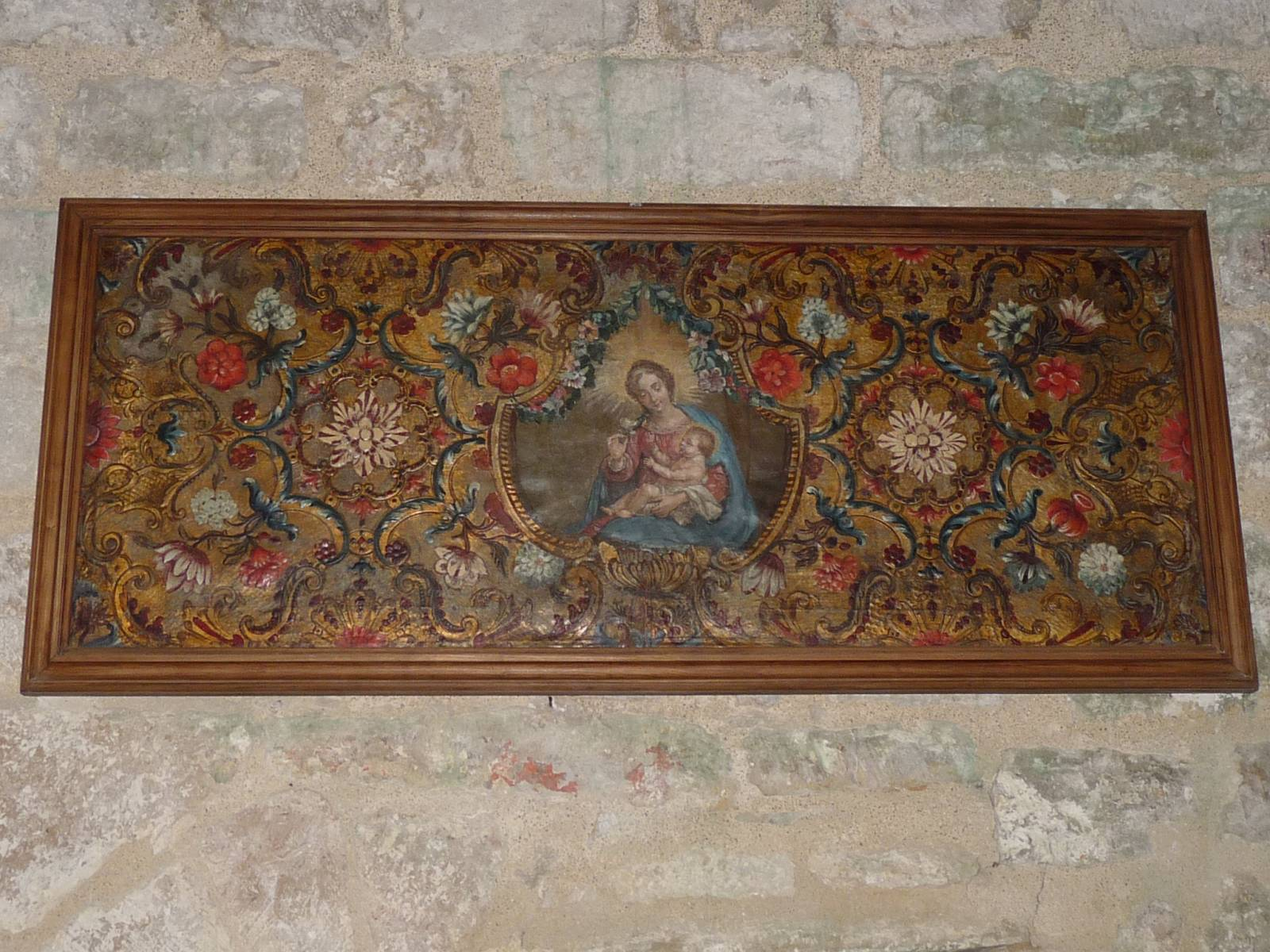
Front of the Altar

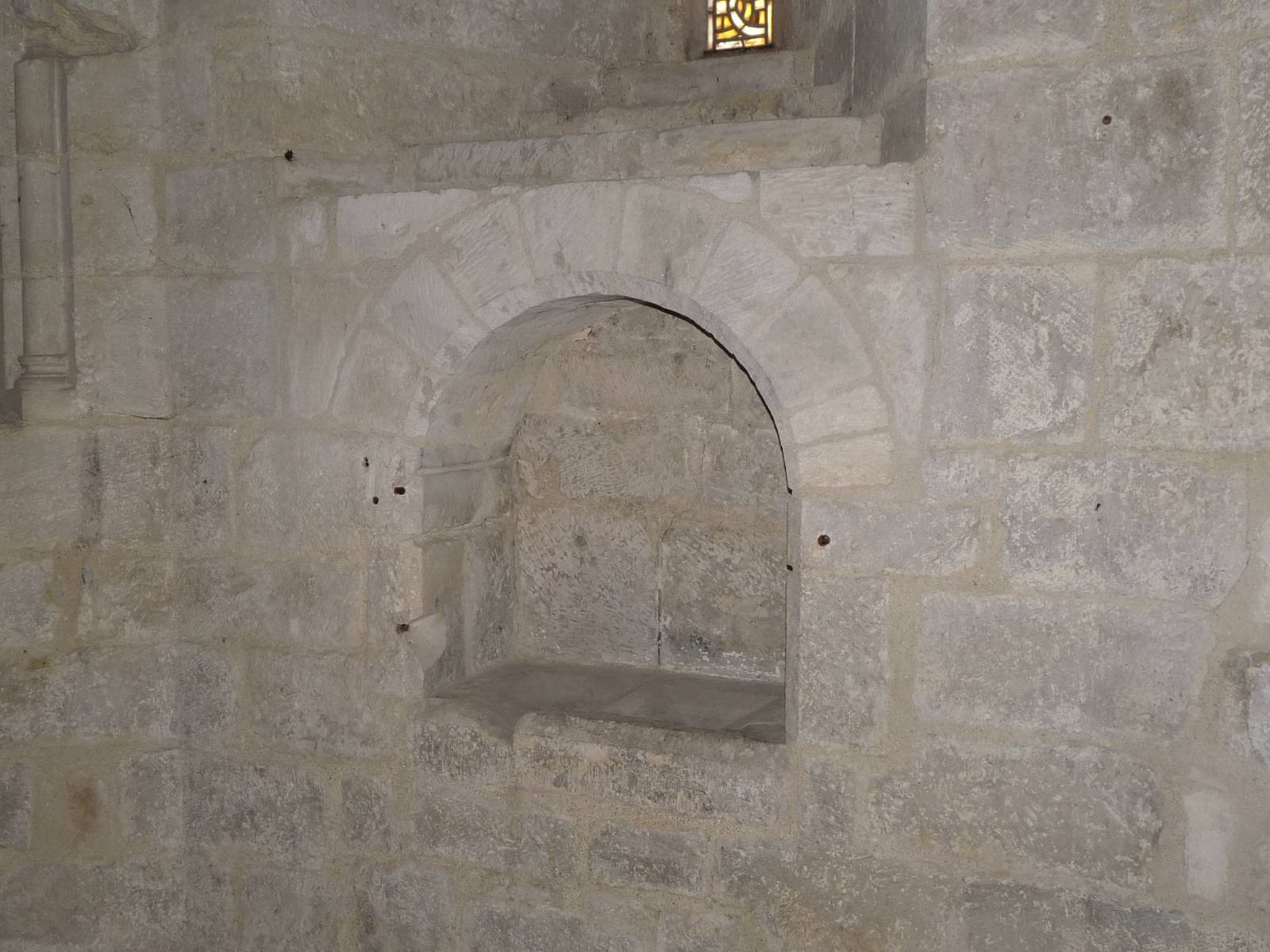
Liturgical Basin

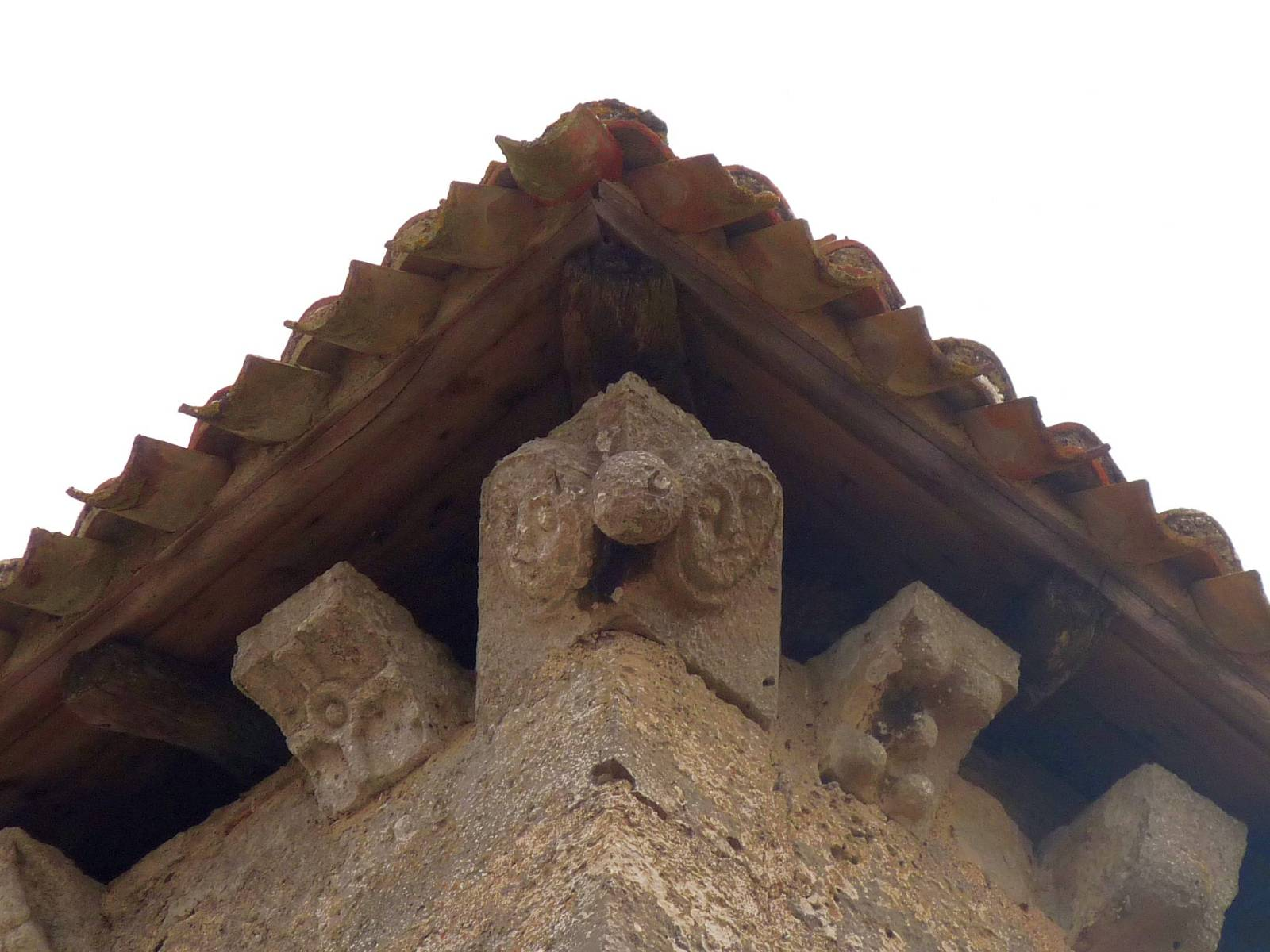
Romanesque Corbels

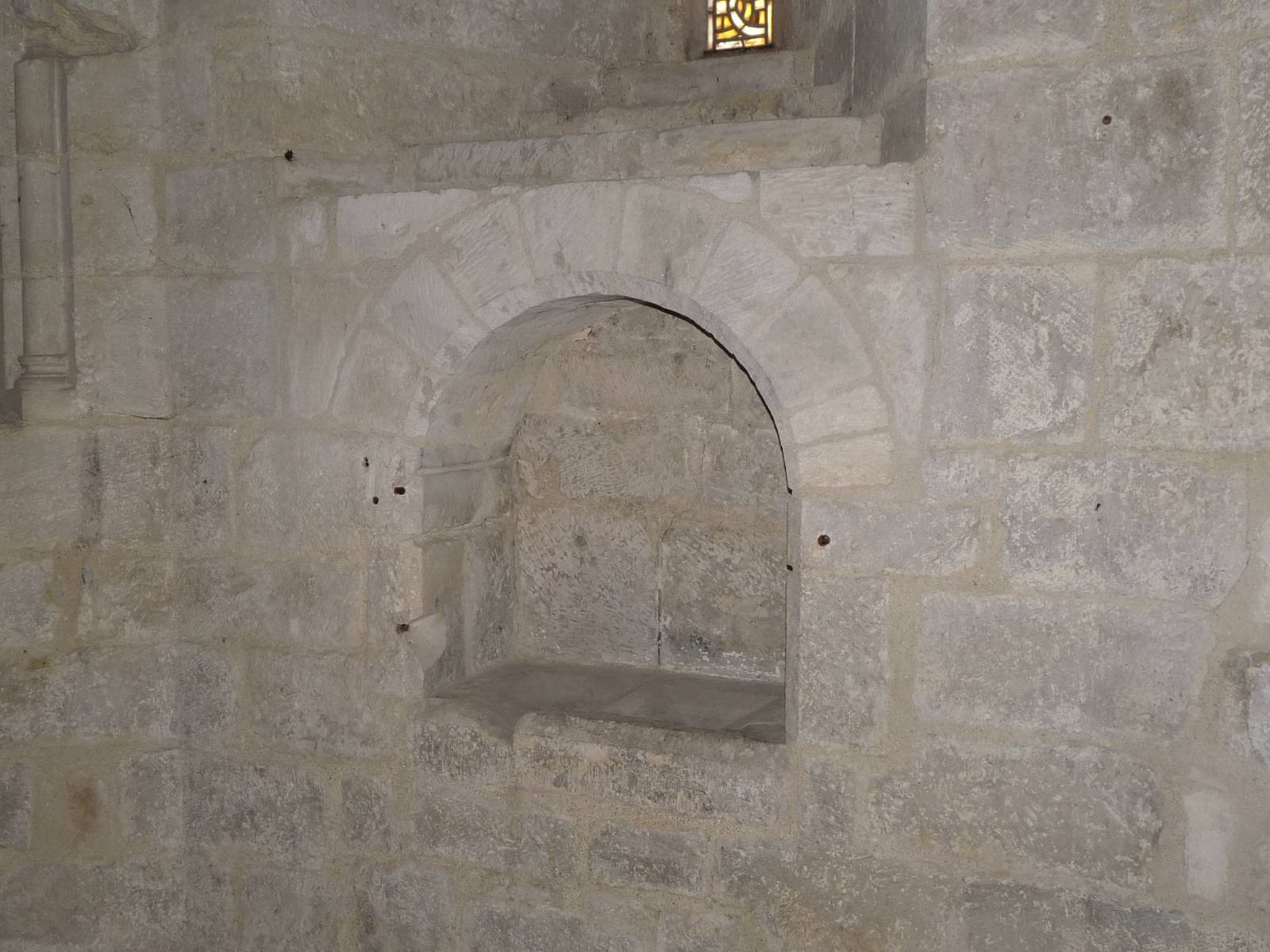
Liturgical wash stand

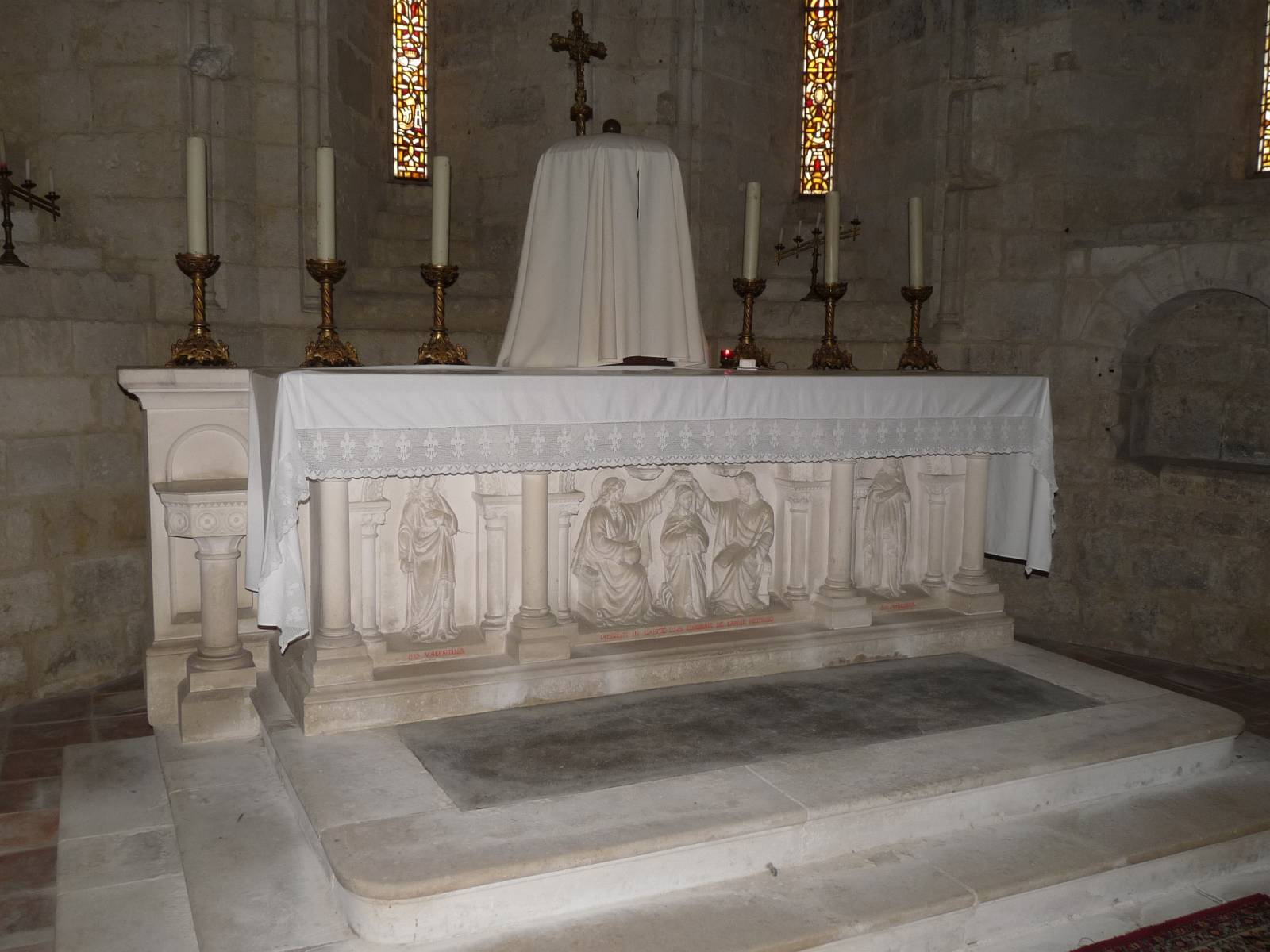
The Altar

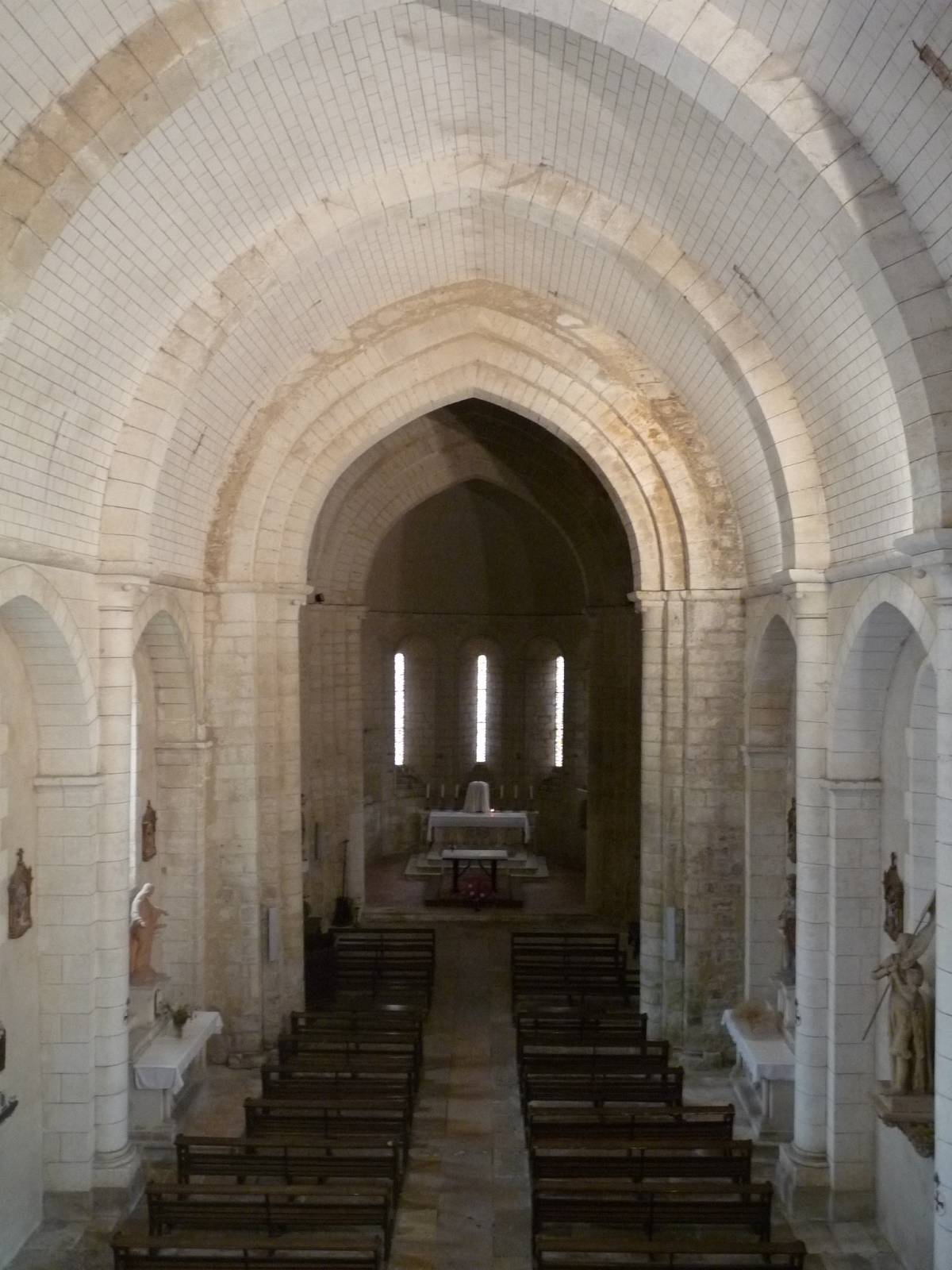
The Nave

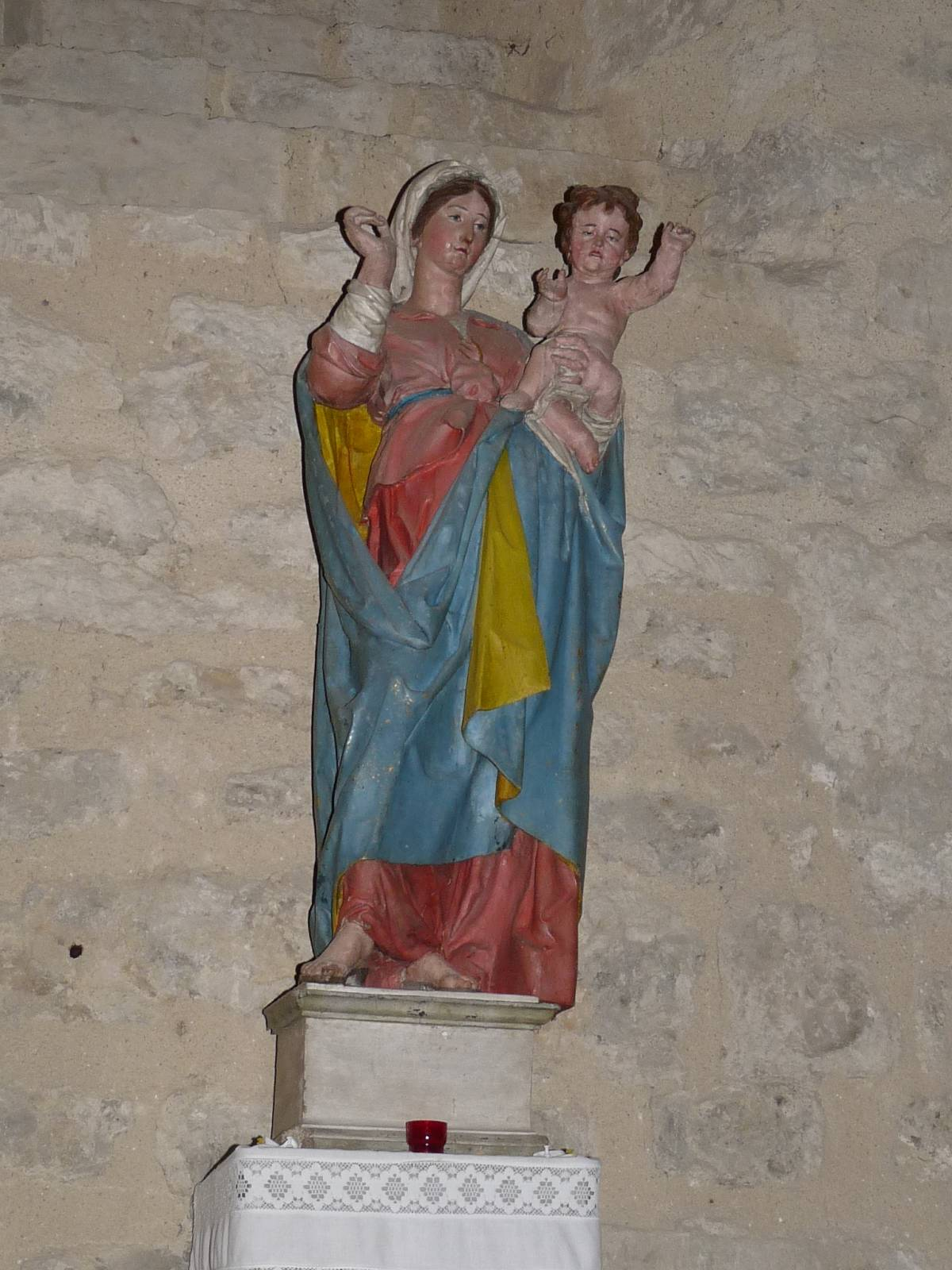
Statue of Virgin and Child

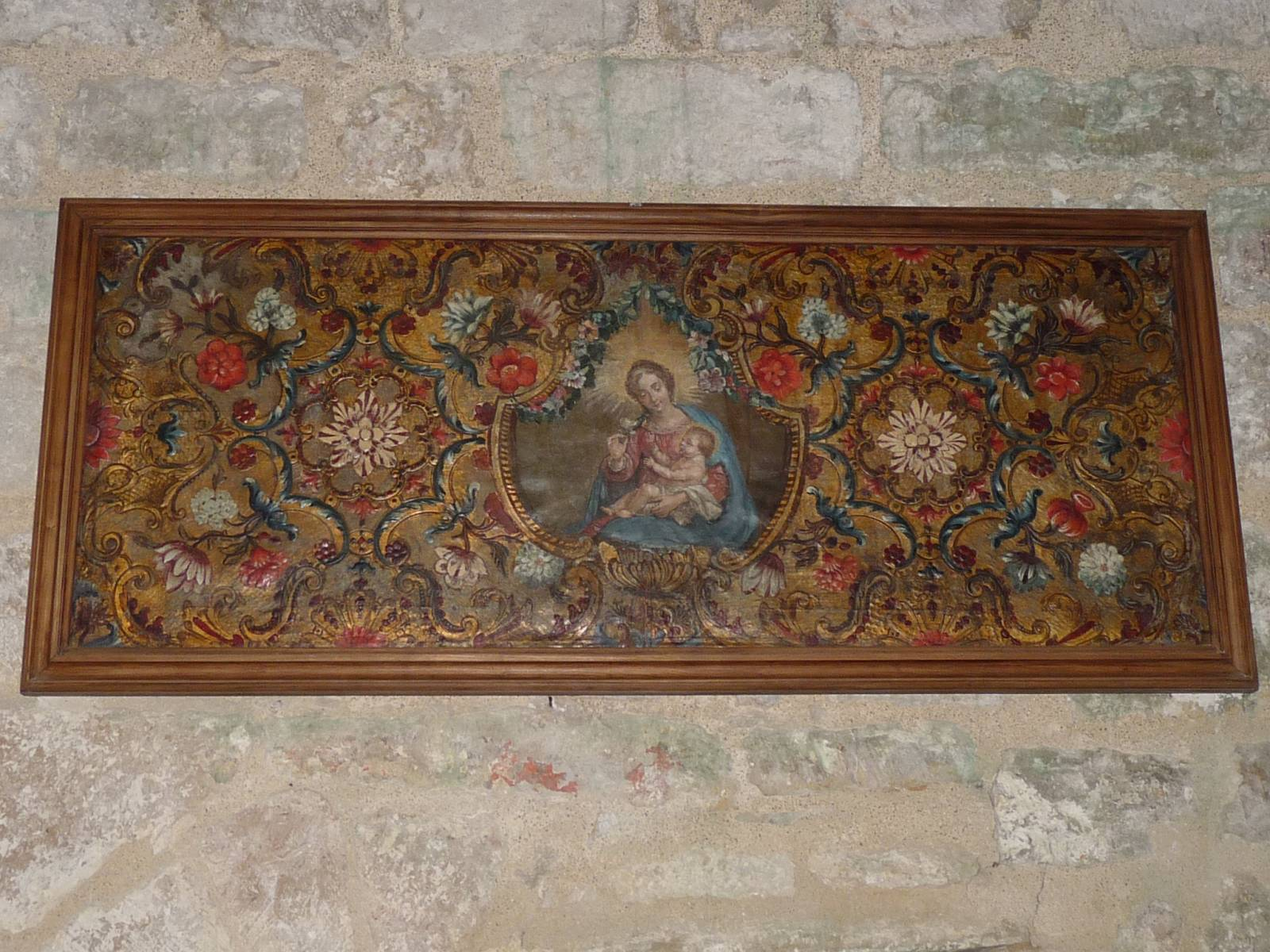
An Antependium embossed in leather (17th century)

The church included both a parish church and a Benedictine priory (12th century) founded by the monks of Charroux in the 8th century that stretched south and west of the church. The Priory of Alloue on the 1740 plan is presented as a set of buildings surrounded by a moat which joined the Charente. Currently the western part still remains – rebuilt in the 16th and 17th centuries. The lodgings of the prior was in line with the north wall of the church, preceded by a courtyard overlooking the street between the two towers. Another house has since been built on the site of the courtyard.

The Old Priory

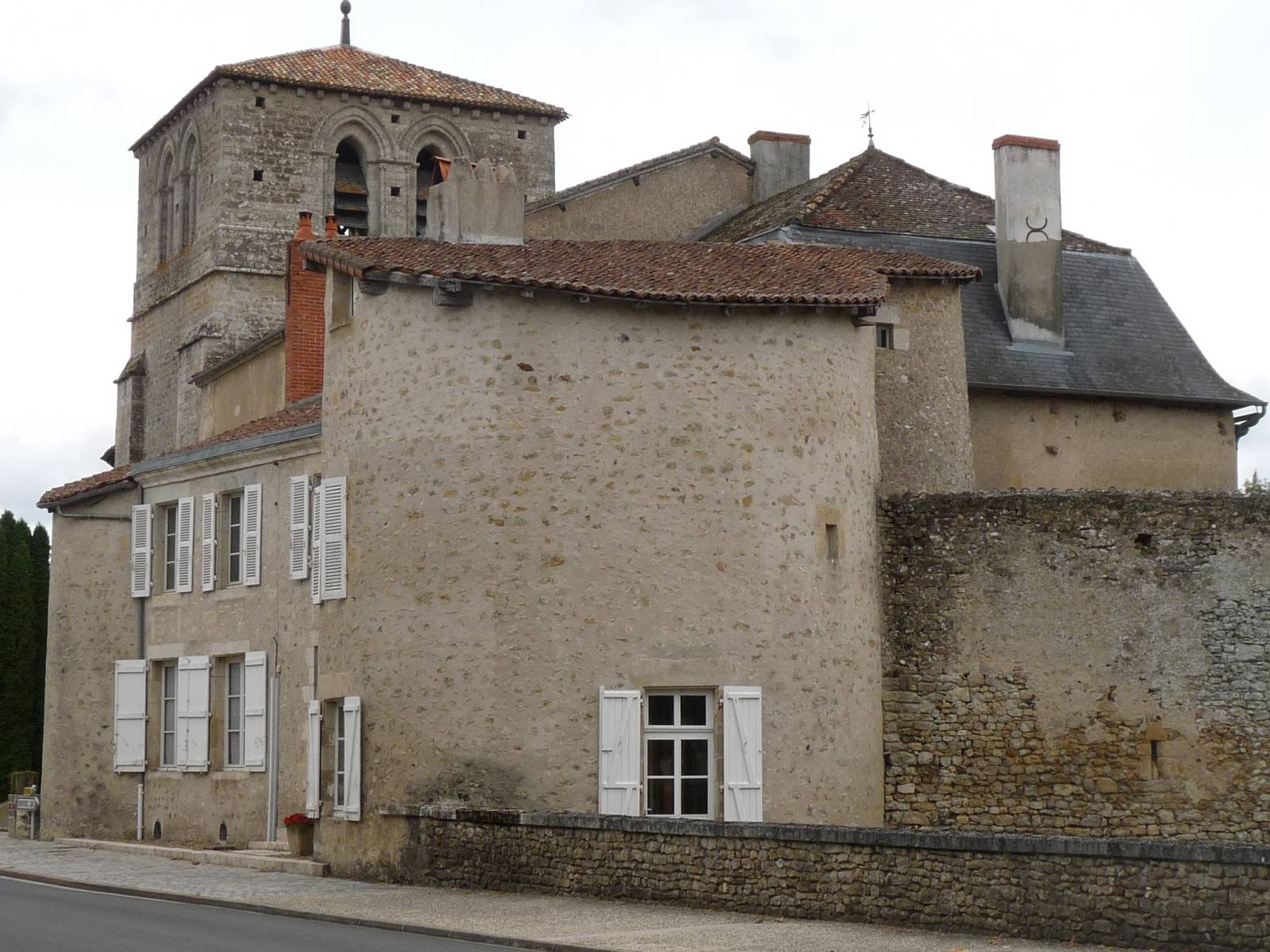
Old Tower

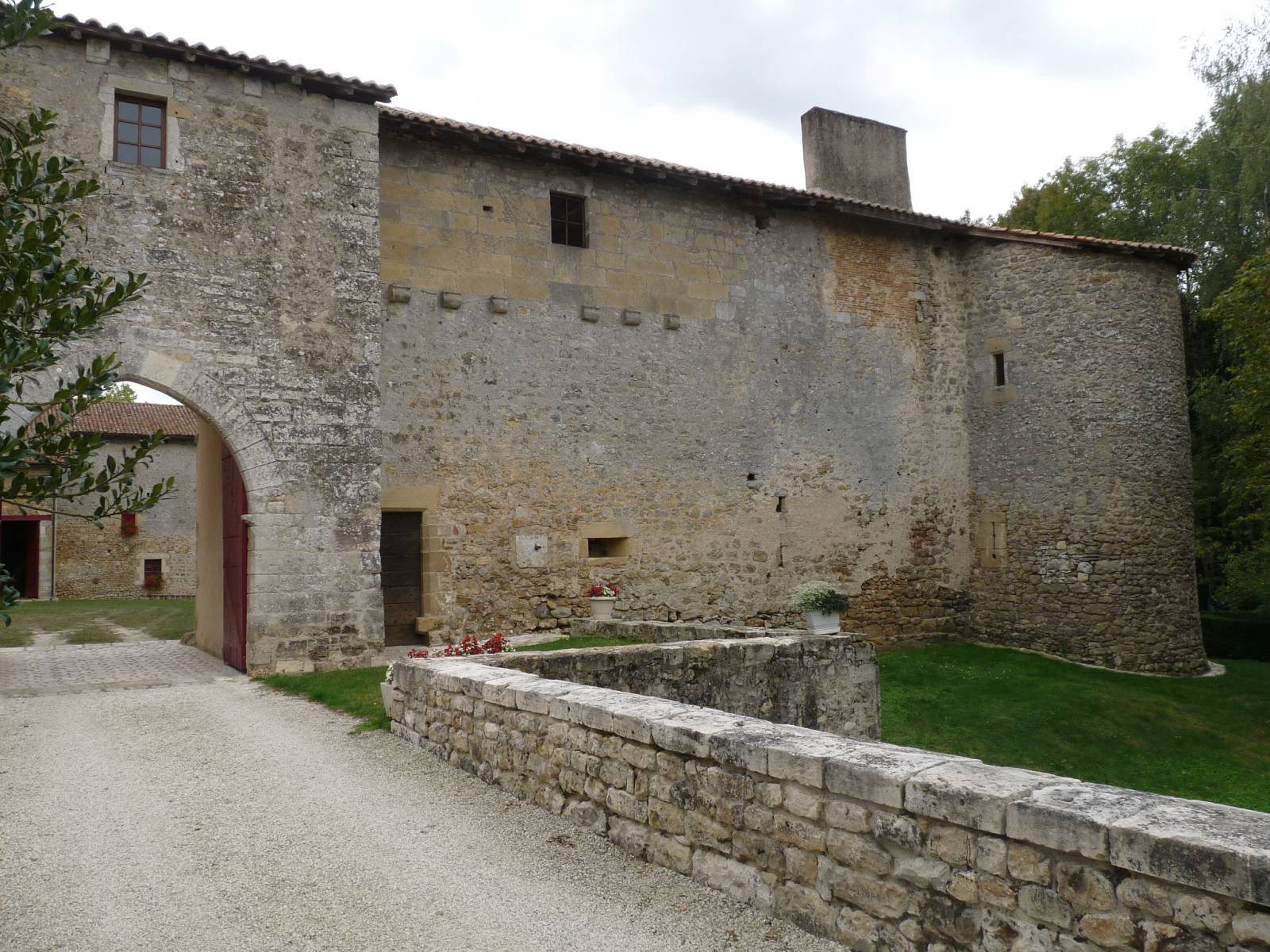
Bridge and Moat
- There are numerous Wayside Crosses dating to the 19th century. Five of them are listed as historical monuments:
  - The Wayside Cross at the D740 and D169 crossroads (19th century)
  - The Wayside Cross at Chez Pasquet (19th century)
  - The Wayside Cross near Le Beau (19th century)
  - The Wayside Cross at Chez Grillaud (19th century)
  - The Wayside Cross at Les Redons (19th century)

There is a Cemetery Cross (1789) bearing the inscription "PIORRY NOTARY ET FABRIC/QUEUR 1789". This stone cross in a cylindrical drum is raised on a plinth consisting of four steps. In front, a stone font is located on a stone slab.

== Notable People linked to the commune ==
- The Guyot du Repaire (French: [ɡɥijo dy ʁəpɛʁ]; sometimes written Guiot du Repaire or Guyot Durpaire) are an old noble family from Alloue, in the province of Angoumois (today Charente, France). The name Guyot (or Guiot) derives from the Old French Guy, and appears in the region from at least the 15th century. The territorial suffix du Repaire refers to a fief located near Alloue, giving rise to the cadet branch’s designation. The family is recorded among the military nobility of the region and gave several officers who served during the Ancien Régime, the French Revolution, and the Napoleonic period. The Guyot or Guiot family has the coat of arms: "Gold with three green parrots, beaked, membraned, and collared in red."
- The senior branch of this noble family, of chivalric origin, was titled marquis for the Court Honours in 1745 and had some of the most illustrious alliances, providing many branches throughout the provinces of Basse-Marche, Angoumois, Poitou, Berry, and more. A wholly military house, it has proven its nobility before the intendants of the various provinces mentioned above. This ancient name has been carried by a large number of families, the main one being the Guyot d’Asniere from Poitou, which has divided into numerous cadets branches, notably in Alloue (L’Age de Volude, De Lespare, Du Repaire, Massignac, La Vergne, L’Houmede, La Haute Lande, and Moland).
  - Huon Guyot or Huon Guiot, who was born in 1249 and the various branches of his descendants: Asnieres, La Motte Villognon, Fanet, Lespars, Montorcy, and Repaire including several "Lords of La Vergne" with the first name of Marc.
  - Guyot du Repaire or Guiot du Repaire Jean, was born in Alloue at the castle of Massignac in 1755. Baron du REPAIRE, lieutenant (1777), General of the Army of the Republic in the Revolution (An III). In 1814, during the First Restoration, he was made a Knight of Saint Louis by King Louis XVIII. He was admitted to retirement on September 1, 1815, and died on April 23, 1819, in Angoulême.
  - Louis Guyot or Guiot des Molans (1751 Alloue-1793), who was sentenced by the Revolutionary Tribunal on 7 April 1793 for emigrating in March 1792. He was the first victim of the infamous Revolutionary Tribunal.
  - Guillaume-François Tardivet du Repaire (1757 – 1826) Although sometimes identified as belonging to a related branch of the same Angoumois nobility, Guillaume-François Tardivet du Repaire was also born in Charente. An officer in the Garde du Corps du Roi, he became known for his actions during the October Days of 1789, when the royal apartments at Versailles were invaded by the Paris mob. Stationed near Queen Marie-Antoinette’s quarters, he fought to protect her and was wounded several times while enabling her escape to the King’s apartments — an act for which he was long remembered in royalist memoirs. Following these events, he emigrated and later served abroad before returning to France at the Bourbon Restoration, when he was named officier de la Légion d’Honneur and lieutenant of the King’s Bodyguard. He died in 1826. Heritage The Guyot du Repaire name remains linked to the history of Alloue and to the military nobility of Angoumois. The family’s service across both royalist and revolutionary periods reflects the complex loyalties of provincial gentilshommes during the transformation of France in the late eighteenth century. References
    - Archives départementales de la Charente, series E (familles nobles de l’Angoumois).
    - Bulletin de la Société Archéologique et Historique de la Charente, various volumes.
    - Wikipedia – Jean Guiot du Repaire (FR)
    - Wikipedia – Guillaume-François Tardivet du Repaire (FR)
    - Armorial de l’Angoumois et du Limousin (BNF, Gallica).
- Paul Mairat, journalist, general counsel of Champagne-Mouton in 1894 then elected MP in 1906, he was an initiator of the narrow gauge railway line from Angoulême-Roumazières to Saint Angeau – the Chemins de fer économiques des Charentes. His home, Sarah villa, was built in 1910.
- María Casares (La Coruña 21 November 1922 – Alloue 22 November 1996), an actress of Spanish origin. To thank France for being a safe haven, on her death she gave her Logis de La Vergne (purchased on 10 June 1961) to the commune of Alloue, which became the "House of the comedian María Casares".

== See also ==
- Communes of the Charente department

== Bibliography ==
- Dujardin V. Moinot É., Ourry Y. (2007), The Confolentais between Poitou, Charente, and Limousin, Images heritage, No. 243, Geste Editions, 2007. (in French)
