= Guiot =

Guiot or Guyot (English: /ɡiːˈjoʊ/, French: [ɡɥijo]) is an Old French name, an augmentative of Guy. It may also be related to the root guille, meaning deception or silliness.

== People with the given name ==
- Guiot de Dijon (fl. 1215–1225), Burgundian trouvère
- Guiot or Guyot du Repaire (1755–1818), French Army general
- Guiot de Provins (fl. 1180–1208), French poet and trouvère

== People with the surname ==
- Andréa Guiot (1928–2021), French soprano
- Arnold Henry Guyot (1807–1884), Swiss-American geologist and geographer
- Géo-Charles (born Charles Louis Proper Guyot; 1892–1963), French poet and gold medallist at the 1924 Summer Olympics
- Charles Guyot (cyclist, born 1890) (1890–1958), Swiss cyclist
- Charles Guyot (cyclist, born 1925) (1925–1973), Swiss cyclist
- Christophe Guyot (born 1962), French Superbike competitor
- Claude Guyot (born 1947), French cyclist
- Claude-Étienne Guyot (1768–1837), French general
- Cyril Guyot (born 1980), French footballer
- Éric Guyot (born 1962), French cyclist
- Jean Guyot (1512–1588), Franco-Flemish renaissance composer
- Jeanne Guiot, (1889-1963), French engineer specialising in metallurgy, women's rights campainer
- Jules Guyot (1807–1872), French physician and agronomist
- Laurent Guyot (born 1969), French footballer and manager
- Lawrence Guyot (1939–2012), American civil rights activist
- Nicolas Bernard Guiot de Lacour (1771–1809), French Army general
- Raymond Guiot (1930–2025), French flautist, pianist and composer
- Régis Guyot (born 1949), French civil servant (prefect)
- René Guyot (fl. 1882–1900), French Olympic trap shooter
- Sarah Guyot (born 1991), French sprint canoeist
- Sébastienne Guyot (1896–1941), French engineer and Olympic athlete
- Virginie Guyot (born 1976), French Air Force fighter pilot
- Yves Guyot (1843–1928), French politician and economist

== See also ==
- Guyot (disambiguation)
