= Guyot (disambiguation) =

A guyot (English: /ɡiːˈjoʊ/, French: [ɡɥijo]) or tablemount is an isolated underwater volcanic mountain.

Guyot may also refer to:

- Guyot (surname), including a list of people with the name
- Guyot (vine system), a system for training grape vines
- Hilton v. Guyot, an 1895 United States Supreme Court case
- Guyot (crater), a lunar impact crater on the far side of the Moon

== See also ==
- Mount Guyot (disambiguation)
