= Cinquecento (disambiguation) =

Cinquecento is the Italian Renaissance of the 16th century.

Cinquecento may also refer to:

- The Italian word for the number 500
- Cinquecento (early music group)
- Fiat Cinquecento or Fiat 500
- The Piazza dei Cinquecento, named for the 500 Italian soldiers killed at the Battle of Dogali, 1887
