= Bonticou Crag =

Mountain in New York, United States

- Location within New York Location within the United States

Highest point
- Elevation: 1,148 feet (350 m)
- Coordinates: 41°47′20″N 74°07′05″W

Geography
- Location: High Falls, New York, U.S.
- Topo map: USGS Mohonk Lake

Climbing
- Easiest route: Hike

Bonticou Crag is a mountain in the Shawangunk Mountains of New York, south of High Falls, formerly known as Bunticoo Point and Bontecou Crag. Guyot Hill is located west-southwest of Bonticou Crag. A 2.3 mile loop hike called Bonticou Crag Trail is available for hikers to explore the area which begins at the Bonticou Crag trailhead.

== Gallery ==
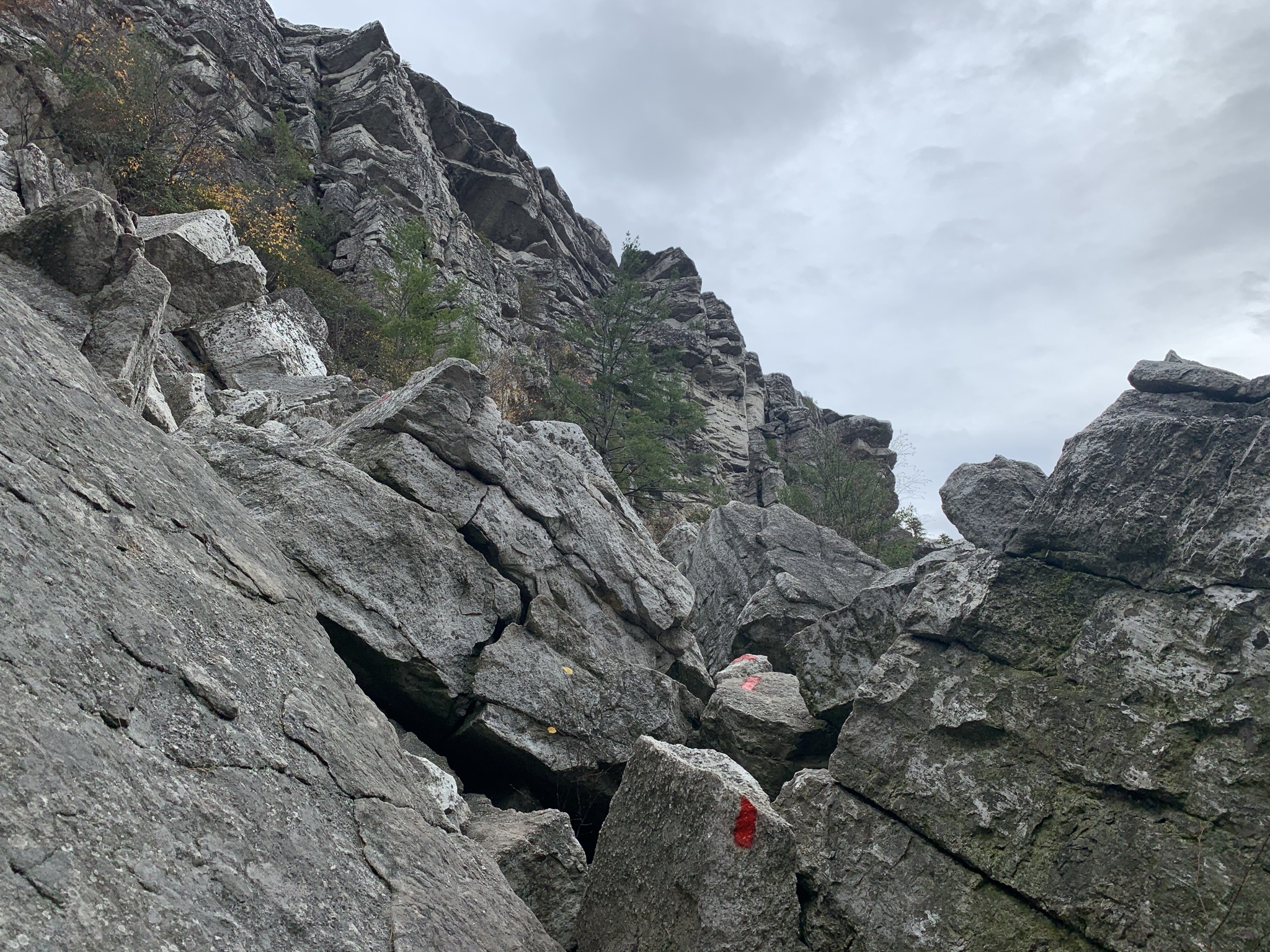
Bonticou Crag, as viewed from the base of the rock scramble

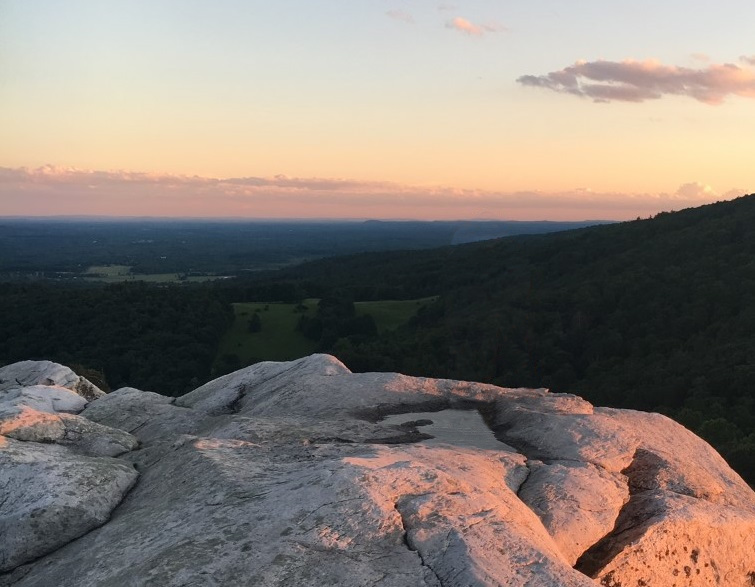
Panoramic sunset view from the top
