= Mount Guyot =

Hills and mountains named Guyot, after geologist Arnold Henry Guyot (1807–1884):

- Mount Guyot (Great Smoky Mountains), on the Tennessee/North Carolina border
- Mount Guyot (New Hampshire)
- Mount Guyot (California), on the Sierra Peaks Section list
- Mount Guyot (Colorado)
- Guyot Hill (New York)
