= Jean Guyot =

Jean Guyot (French: [ʒɑ̃ ɡɥijo]; Châtelet, Belgium, 1512 - 1588) was a Franco-Flemish renaissance composer.

After studies at the University of Louvain, where he earned in 1537 the grade of Bachelor of Arts, he became chaplain to the Collegiate Church of St. Paul in Liège where he filled the office of Master of the Chapel at the Saint-Lambert Cathedral. In 1563, he became Kapellmeister to the Imperial Court in Vienna for one year. In 1564, he returned to Liège to the Cathedral where he led the music activities for twenty-five years. He was highly regarded by his contemporaries, including Hermann Finck. In addition to music (chansons, motets, a Te Deum), he also published a poetical work.

== Works ==
Secular Music

- En lieux d'esbatz m'assault melancolie
- Je suis amoureux d'une fille
- Vous estes si doulce et benigne
- L'arbre d'amour ung fruict d'amaritude
- Vous perdez temps de me dire mal d'elle
- Tel en mesdict sui pour soy la desire

Sacred Music

- Te Deum laudamus
- Amen, amen dico vobis
- Te Deum Patrem
- Omni tempore benedic Deum
- O florens rosa
- Accepit Jesus panem
- Prudentes virgines
- Adorna thalamum
- Noe, noe, genuit puerpera
- Ave Maria

== Recordings ==
- Amorosi Pensieri Cinquecento (early music group) (Hyperion Records, CDA68053, 2014)
- Te Deum laudamus & other sacred music Cinquecento (early music group) (Hyperion Records, CDA68180, 2017)
