= Bernac, Charente =

Bernac
- Commune
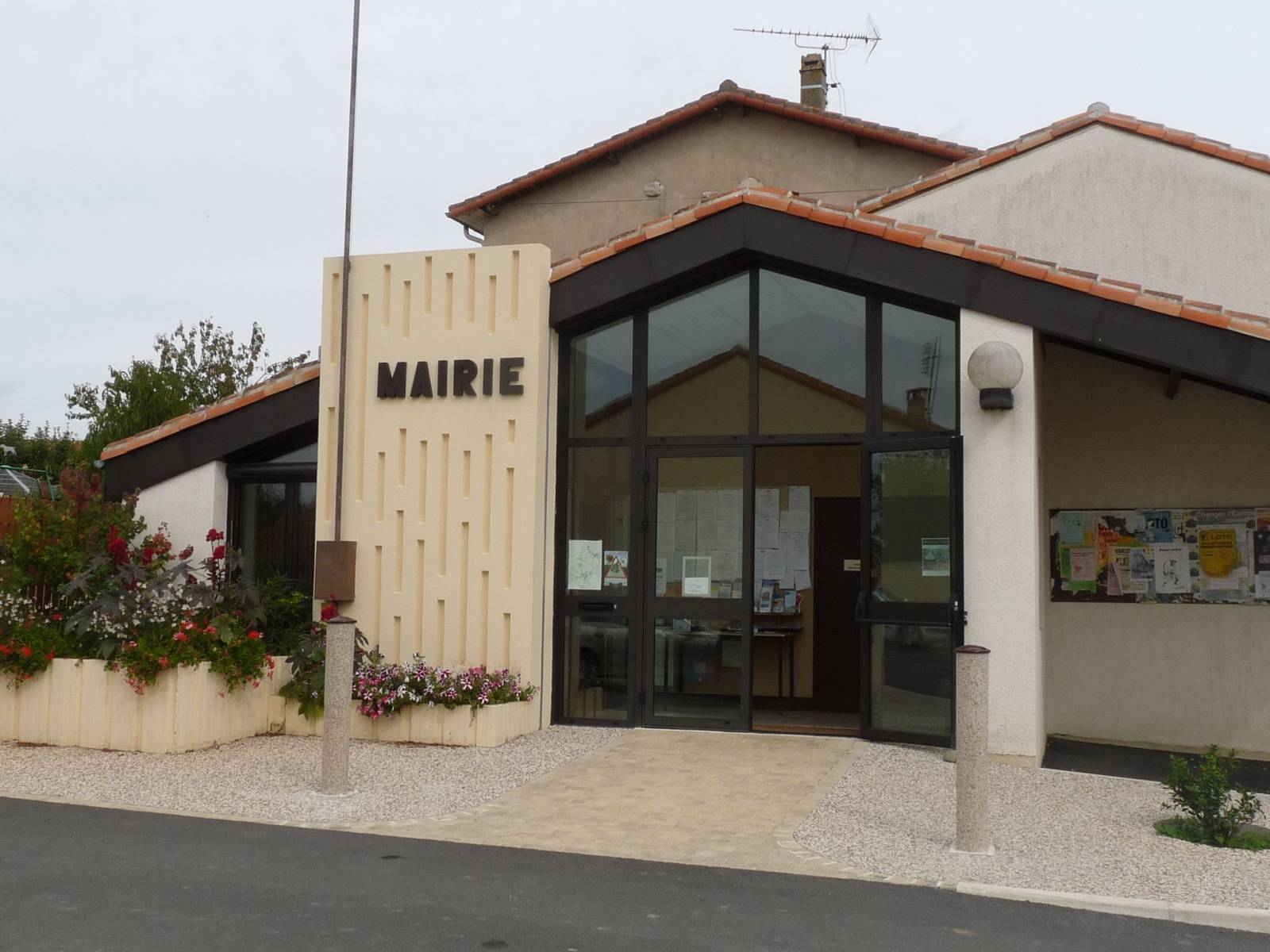
- Town hall
- Location of Bernac
- Location within France Location within Nouvelle-Aquitaine
- Coordinates: 46°02′48″N 0°10′32″E
- Country: France
- Region: Nouvelle-Aquitaine
- Department: Charente
- Arrondissement: Confolens
- Canton: Charente-Nord

Government
  - Mayor (2020–2026): Jean-Jacques Vrignon
- Area^{1}: 8.46 km^{2} (3.27 sq mi)
- Elevation: 103 m (338 ft)
- Highest elevation: 152 m (499 ft)
- Lowest elevation: 94 m (308 ft)
- Population (2023): 465
  - Density: 55.0/km^{2} (142/sq mi)
- Time zone: UTC+01:00 (CET)
  - Summer (DST): UTC+02:00 (CEST)
- INSEE/Postal code: 16039 /16700
- ^{1} French Land Register data, which excludes lakes, ponds, glaciers > 1 km^{2} (0.386 sq mi or 247 acres) and river estuaries.

Bernac (French pronunciation: [bɛʁnak]) is a commune in the Charente department in southwestern France.

== Population ==
Historical population
Year	Pop.	±% p.a.
1968	259	—
1975	278	+1.02%
1982	387	+4.84%
1990	433	+1.41%
1999	420	−0.34%
2007	414	−0.18%
2012	481	+3.05%
2017	489	+0.33%
2023	465	−0.84%
Source: INSEE

== See also ==
- Communes of the Charente department
