= Saint-Laurent-de-Céris =

- Commune
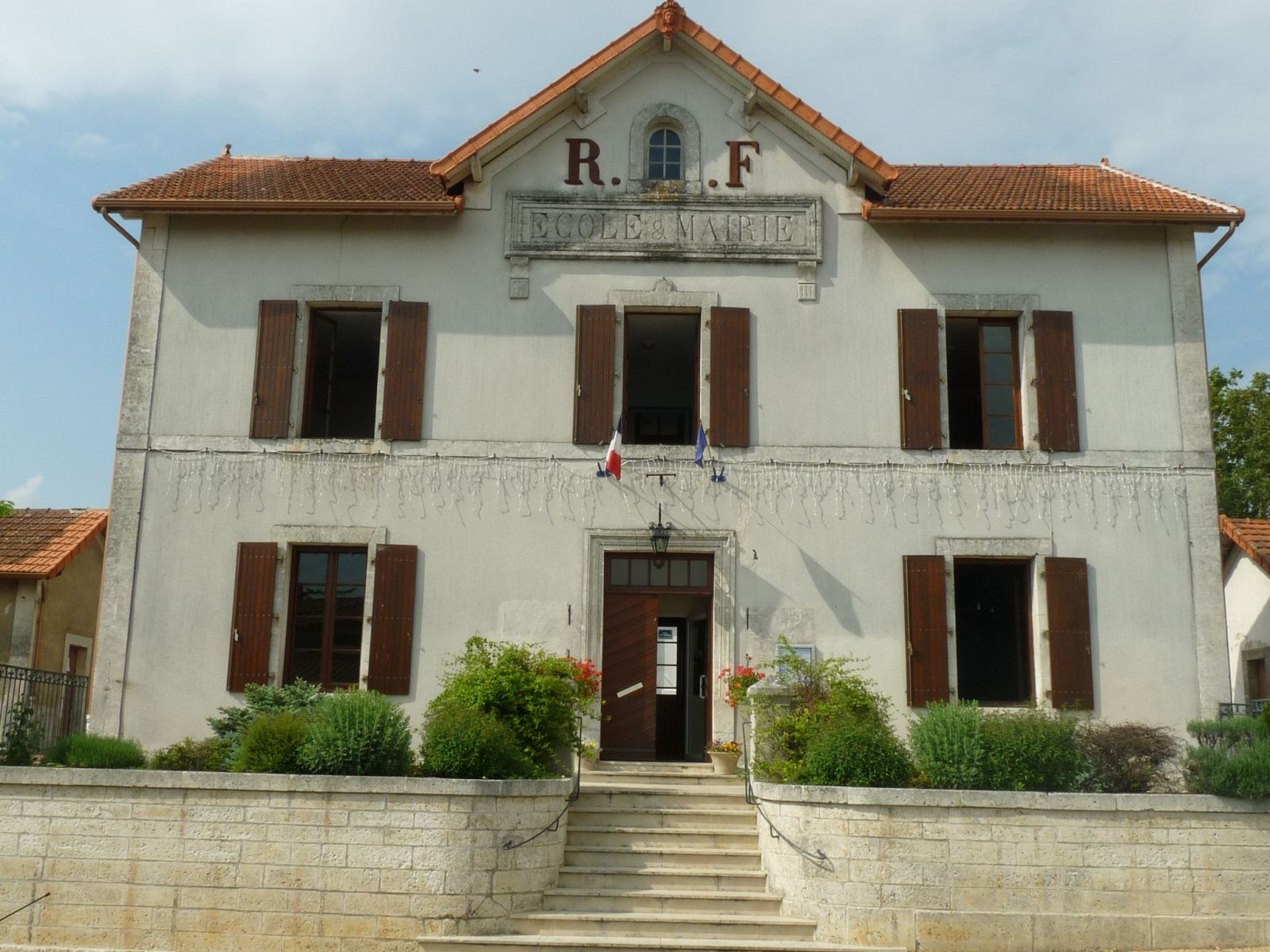
- Town hall

- Coat of arms
- Location of Saint-Laurent-de-Céris
- Location within France Location within Nouvelle-Aquitaine
- Coordinates: 45°56′32″N 0°28′54″E
- Country: France
- Region: Nouvelle-Aquitaine
- Department: Charente
- Arrondissement: Confolens
- Canton: Charente-Bonnieure
- Intercommunality: Charente Limousine

Government
  - Mayor (2020–2026): Manuel Desvergne
- Area^{1}: 29.89 km^{2} (11.54 sq mi)
- Elevation: 190 m (620 ft)
- Highest elevation: 209 m (686 ft)
- Lowest elevation: 127 m (417 ft)
- Population (2023): 720
  - Density: 24/km^{2} (62/sq mi)
- Time zone: UTC+01:00 (CET)
  - Summer (DST): UTC+02:00 (CEST)
- INSEE/Postal code: 16329 /16450
- ^{1} French Land Register data, which excludes lakes, ponds, glaciers > 1 km^{2} (0.386 sq mi or 247 acres) and river estuaries.

Saint-Laurent-de-Céris (French pronunciation: [sɛ̃ loʁɑ̃ də seʁi]) is a commune in the Charente department in southwestern France.

== Population ==
Historical population
Year	Pop.	±% p.a.
1968	1,001	—
1975	883	−1.78%
1982	802	−1.37%
1990	741	−0.98%
1999	746	+0.07%
2007	757	+0.18%
2012	786	+0.75%
2017	778	−0.20%
2023	720	−1.28%
Source: INSEE

== See also ==
- Communes of the Charente department
