= Guyot Hill (New York) =

Mountain in New York, United States

- Location within New York Location within the United States Location within the United States

Highest point
- Elevation: 1,257 feet (383 m)
- Coordinates: 41°47′05″N 74°07′34″W

Geography
- Location: High Falls, New York, U.S.
- Topo map: USGS Mohonk Lake

Guyot Hill is a mountain located in the Shawangunk Mountains of New York, south of High Falls. Bonticou Crag is located east-northeast of Guyot Hill.
