= Cinquecento (early music group) =

Vocal ensemble

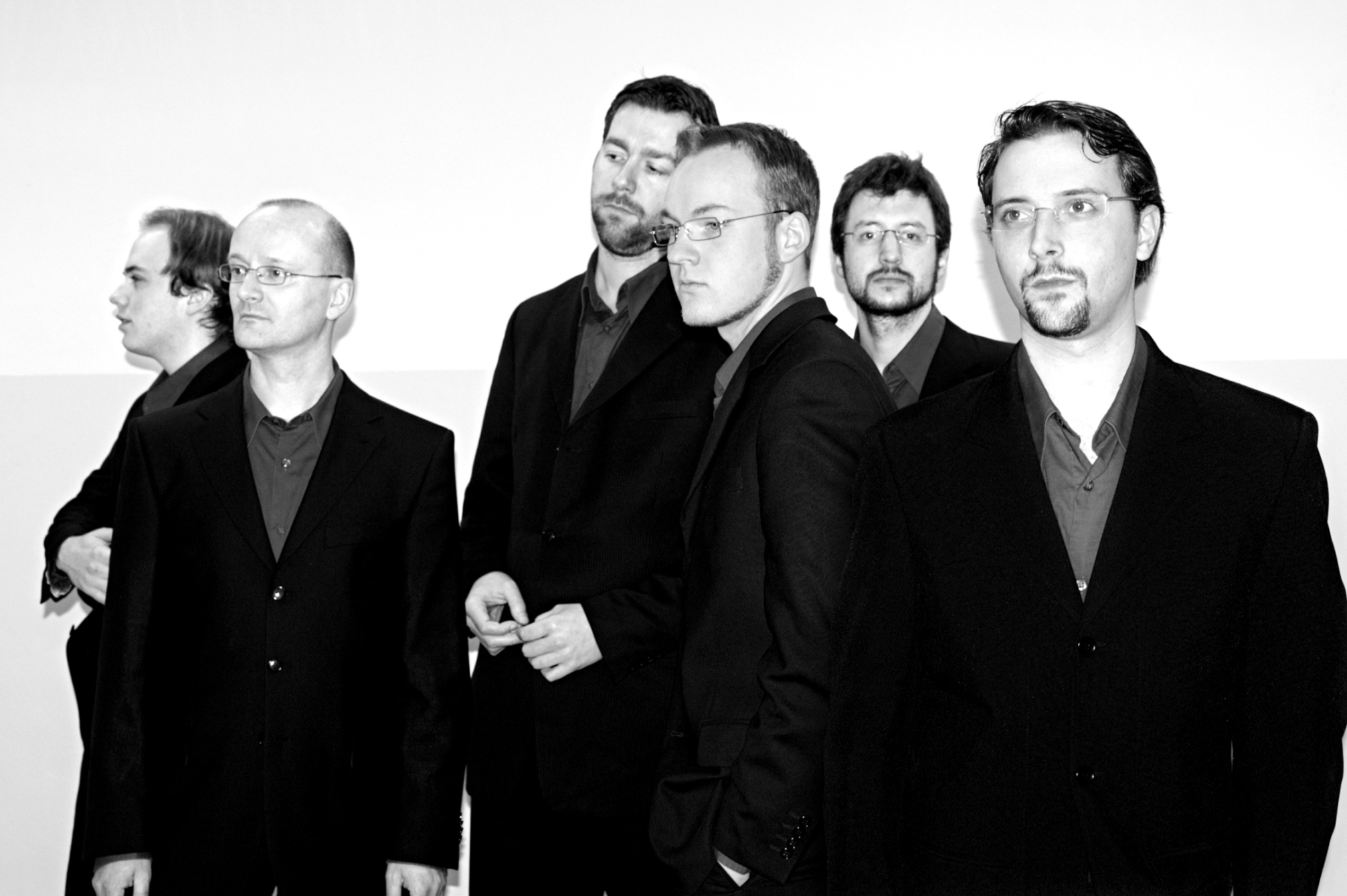
Ensemble Cinquecento

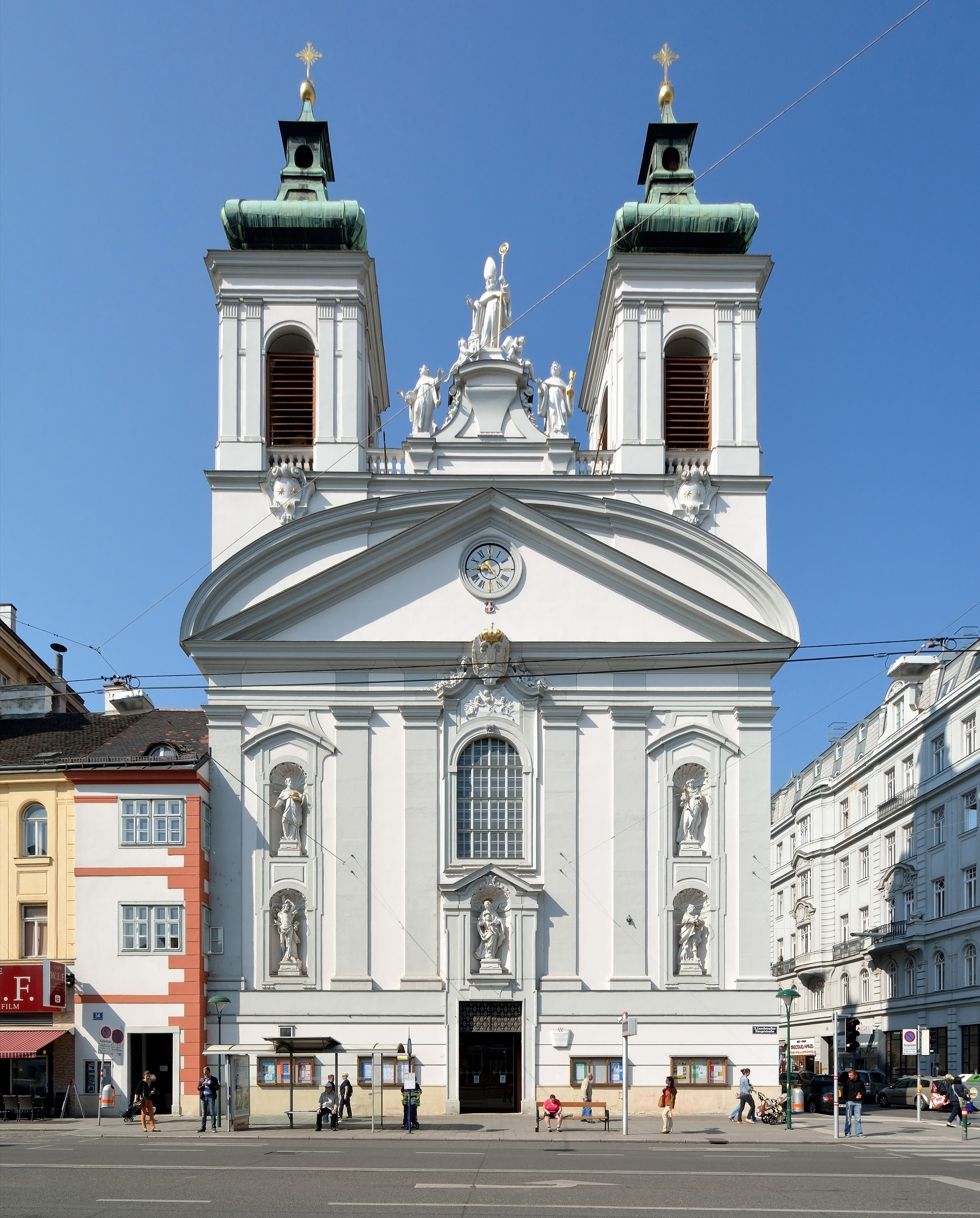
St Rochus in Vienna, base of the ensemble

Cinquecento is a Vienna based vocal ensemble formed in 2004 comprising five singers from Austria, Belgium, England, Germany and Switzerland.

== Discography ==
- Music for the Court of Maximilian II (Hyperion Records, CDA67579, 2007)
- Jacob Regnart: Missa Super Oeniades Nymphae & other sacred music (Hyperion Records, CDA67640, 2007)
- Philippe de Monte: Missa Ultimi miei sospiri (Hyperion Records, CDA67658, 2008)
- Jacobus Vaet: Missa Ego flos campi & other sacred music (Hyperion Records, CDA67733, 2009)
- Philipp Schoendorff: The Complete Works (Hyperion Records, CDA67854, 2011)
- Adrian Willaert: Missa Mente tota & Motets (Hyperion Records, CDA67749, 2010)
- Richafort: Requiem & other sacred music (Hyperion Records, CDA67959, 2012)
- Jean Guyot Amorosi Peniseiri (Hyperion Records, CDA68053, 2014)
- Orlande de Lassus: Missa super Dixit Joseph & motets (Hyperion Records, CDA68064, 2015)
- Jean Guyot Te Deum laudamus & other sacred music (Hyperion Records, CDA68180, 2017)
