= Champagne-Mouton =

- Commune
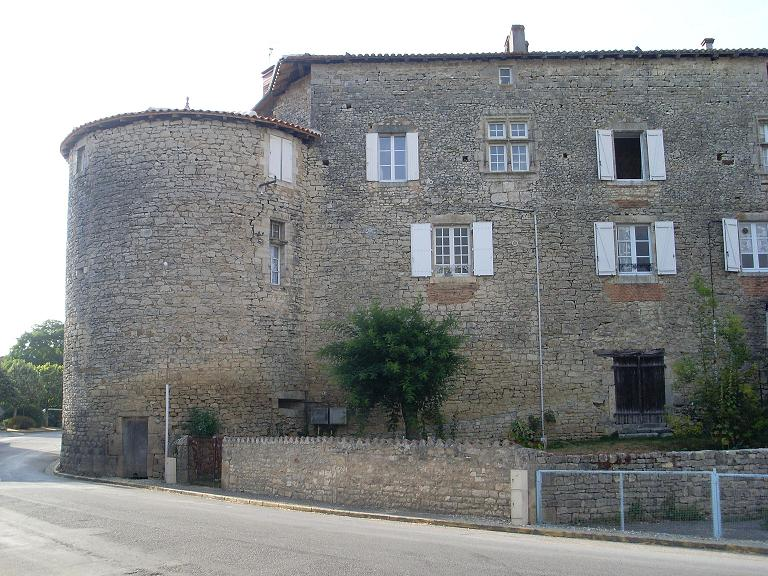
- Chateau

- Coat of arms
- Location of Champagne-Mouton
- Location within France Location within Nouvelle-Aquitaine
- Coordinates: 45°59′31″N 0°24′42″E
- Country: France
- Region: Nouvelle-Aquitaine
- Department: Charente
- Arrondissement: Confolens
- Canton: Charente-Bonnieure
- Intercommunality: Charente Limousine

Government
  - Mayor (2020–2026): Benoît Gagnadour
- Area^{1}: 22.59 km^{2} (8.72 sq mi)
- Elevation: 176 m (577 ft)
- Highest elevation: 194 m (636 ft)
- Lowest elevation: 115 m (377 ft)
- Population (2023): 873
  - Density: 38.6/km^{2} (100/sq mi)
- Time zone: UTC+01:00 (CET)
  - Summer (DST): UTC+02:00 (CEST)
- INSEE/Postal code: 16076 /16350
- ^{1} French Land Register data, which excludes lakes, ponds, glaciers > 1 km^{2} (0.386 sq mi or 247 acres) and river estuaries.

Champagne-Mouton (French pronunciation: [ʃɑ̃paɲ mutɔ̃]) is a commune in the Charente department in southwestern France.

== Population ==
Historical population
Year	Pop.	±% p.a.
1968	1,063	—
1975	938	−1.77%
1982	975	+0.55%
1990	1,012	+0.47%
1999	984	−0.31%
2007	983	−0.01%
2012	967	−0.33%
2017	874	−2.00%
2023	873	−0.02%
Source: INSEE

== See also ==
- Communes of the Charente department
