= Benest =

- Commune
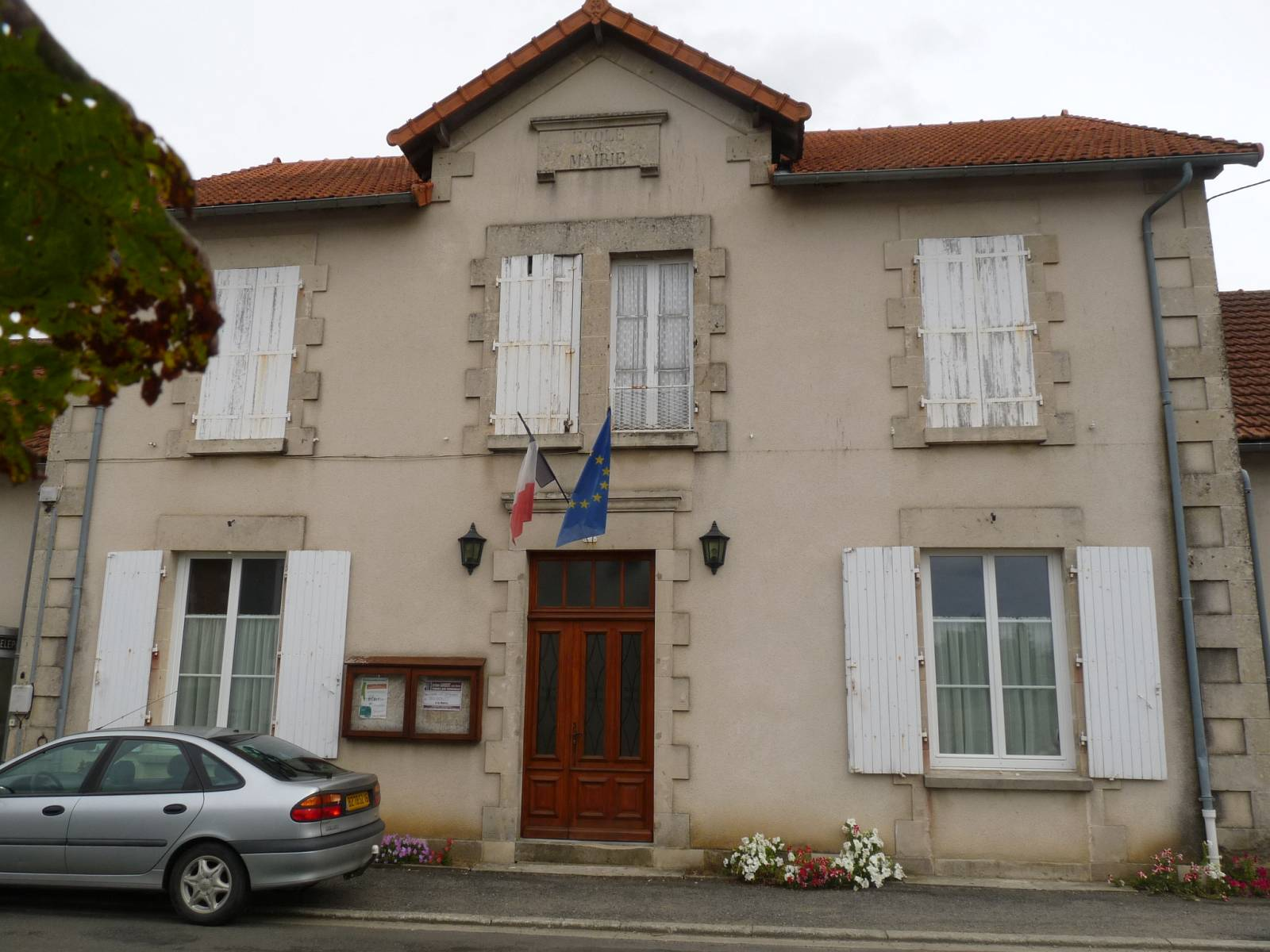
- Town hall

- Coat of arms
- Location of Benest
- Location within France Location within Nouvelle-Aquitaine
- Coordinates: 46°02′21″N 0°27′10″E
- Country: France
- Region: Nouvelle-Aquitaine
- Department: Charente
- Arrondissement: Confolens
- Canton: Charente-Bonnieure
- Intercommunality: Charente Limousine

Government
  - Mayor (2020–2026): Olivier Chériot
- Area^{1}: 21.10 km^{2} (8.15 sq mi)
- Elevation: 160 m (520 ft)
- Highest elevation: 192 m (630 ft)
- Lowest elevation: 132 m (433 ft)
- Population (2023): 307
  - Density: 14.5/km^{2} (37.7/sq mi)
- Time zone: UTC+01:00 (CET)
  - Summer (DST): UTC+02:00 (CEST)
- INSEE/Postal code: 16038 /16350
- ^{1} French Land Register data, which excludes lakes, ponds, glaciers > 1 km^{2} (0.386 sq mi or 247 acres) and river estuaries.

Benest (French pronunciation: [bənɛ]) is a commune in the Charente department in southwestern France.

== Population ==
Historical population
| Year | Pop. | ±% p.a. |
|---|---|---|
| 1968 | 663 | — |
| 1975 | 547 | −2.71% |
| 1982 | 470 | −2.14% |
| 1990 | 425 | −1.25% |
| 1999 | 382 | −1.18% |
| 2007 | 363 | −0.64% |
| 2012 | 337 | −1.48% |
| 2017 | 315 | −1.34% |
| 2023 | 307 | −0.43% |
Source: INSEE

== See also ==
- Communes of the Charente department
