= Roumazières-Loubert =

- Part of Terres-de-Haute-Charente
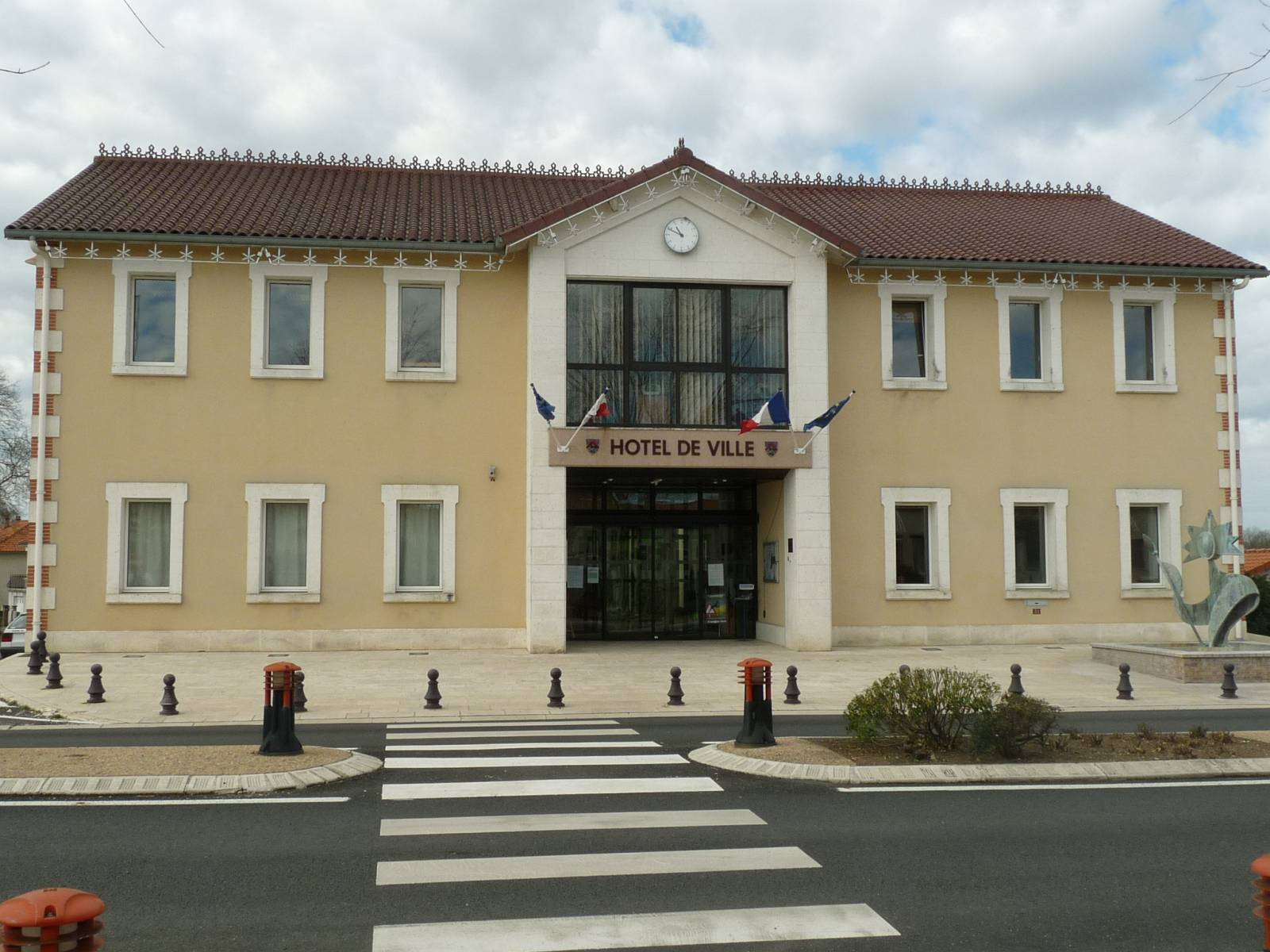
- Town hall

- Coat of arms
- Location of Roumazières-Loubert
- Location within France Location within Nouvelle-Aquitaine
- Coordinates: 45°53′45″N 0°34′34″E
- Country: France
- Region: Nouvelle-Aquitaine
- Department: Charente
- Arrondissement: Confolens
- Canton: Charente-Bonnieure
- Commune: Terres-de-Haute-Charente
- Area^{1}: 46.59 km^{2} (17.99 sq mi)
- Highest elevation: 245 m (804 ft)
- Lowest elevation: 155 m (509 ft)
- Population (2022): 2,368
  - Density: 50.83/km^{2} (131.6/sq mi)
- Time zone: UTC+01:00 (CET)
  - Summer (DST): UTC+02:00 (CEST)
- Postal code: 16270
- ^{1} French Land Register data, which excludes lakes, ponds, glaciers > 1 km^{2} (0.386 sq mi or 247 acres) and river estuaries.

Roumazières-Loubert (French pronunciation: [ʁumazjɛʁ lubɛʁ]; Occitan: Romasieras Loberc) is a former commune in the Charente department in southwestern France. It was created in 1970 by the merger of the former communes Loubert-Madieu, Chantrezac and Roumazières. On 1 January 2019, it was merged into the new commune Terres-de-Haute-Charente.

== Population ==
Historical population
Year	Pop.	±% p.a.
1975	3,146	—
1982	3,007	−0.64%
1990	3,002	−0.02%
1999	2,781	−0.85%
2006	2,616	−0.87%
2022	2,368	−0.62%
Source: EHESS and INSEE (2022)

== See also ==
- Communes of the Charente department
