= Épenède =

- Commune
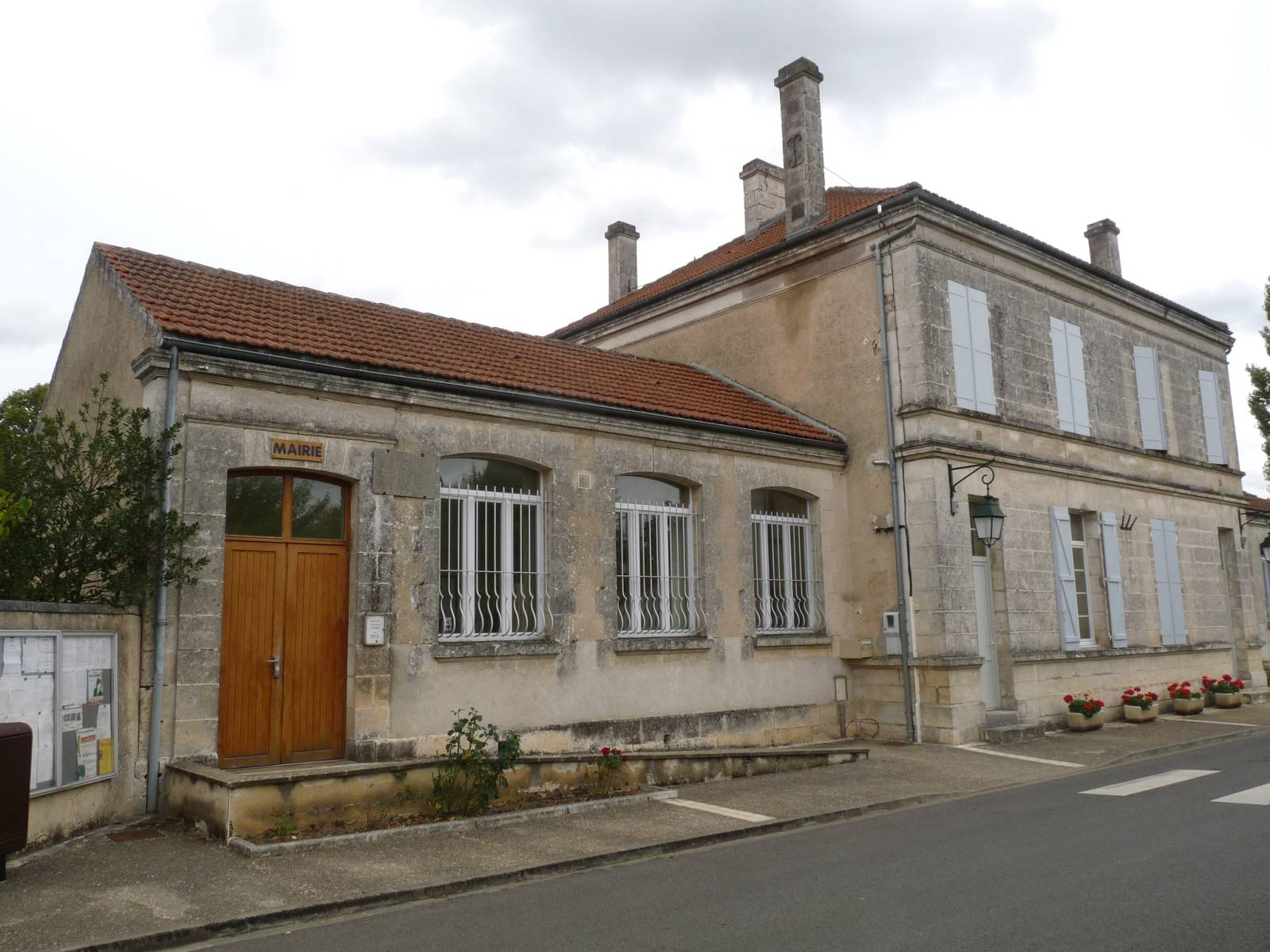
- The town hall in Épenède
- Location of Épenède
- Location within France Location within Nouvelle-Aquitaine
- Coordinates: 46°03′52″N 0°32′17″E
- Country: France
- Region: Nouvelle-Aquitaine
- Department: Charente
- Arrondissement: Confolens
- Canton: Charente-Vienne
- Intercommunality: Charente Limousine

Government
  - Mayor (2020–2026): Philippe Denimal
- Area^{1}: 15.62 km^{2} (6.03 sq mi)
- Elevation: 192 m (630 ft)
- Highest elevation: 194 m (636 ft)
- Lowest elevation: 144 m (472 ft)
- Population (2023): 206
  - Density: 13.2/km^{2} (34.2/sq mi)
- Time zone: UTC+01:00 (CET)
  - Summer (DST): UTC+02:00 (CEST)
- INSEE/Postal code: 16128 /16490
- ^{1} French Land Register data, which excludes lakes, ponds, glaciers > 1 km^{2} (0.386 sq mi or 247 acres) and river estuaries.

Épenède (French pronunciation: [epnɛd]; Occitan: Espeneda) is a commune in the Charente department in southwestern France.

Épenède, of which the Latin spina would mean thorn shrub, is bordered to the north by the department of Vienne and to the southwest by the valley of the river Transon. The village is situated on the dividing line of the waters of the Charente and the Vienne. The parish of Épenède was a dependant of the vast domains of the Benedictine abbey at nearby Charroux and in the diocese of Poitiers.

== Population ==
Historical population
Year	Pop.	±% p.a.
1968	323	—
1975	269	−2.58%
1982	256	−0.71%
1990	242	−0.70%
1999	209	−1.62%
2007	209	+0.00%
2012	220	+1.03%
2017	185	−3.41%
2023	206	+1.81%
Source: INSEE

== Sights ==
The Holy Church of St. Hilaire is 12th century and is of Limousin style (except the steeple bell tower which is more recent). This structure was burned at the time of the Wars of Religion. The capitals of the four spans of the nave are ancient, and one of them represents a monster holding in its claws a human head that it is about to devour. Many water sources or fountains "miraculous" sprinkle the commune.

== See also ==
- Communes of the Charente department
