= Abzac, Charente =

Abzac
- Commune
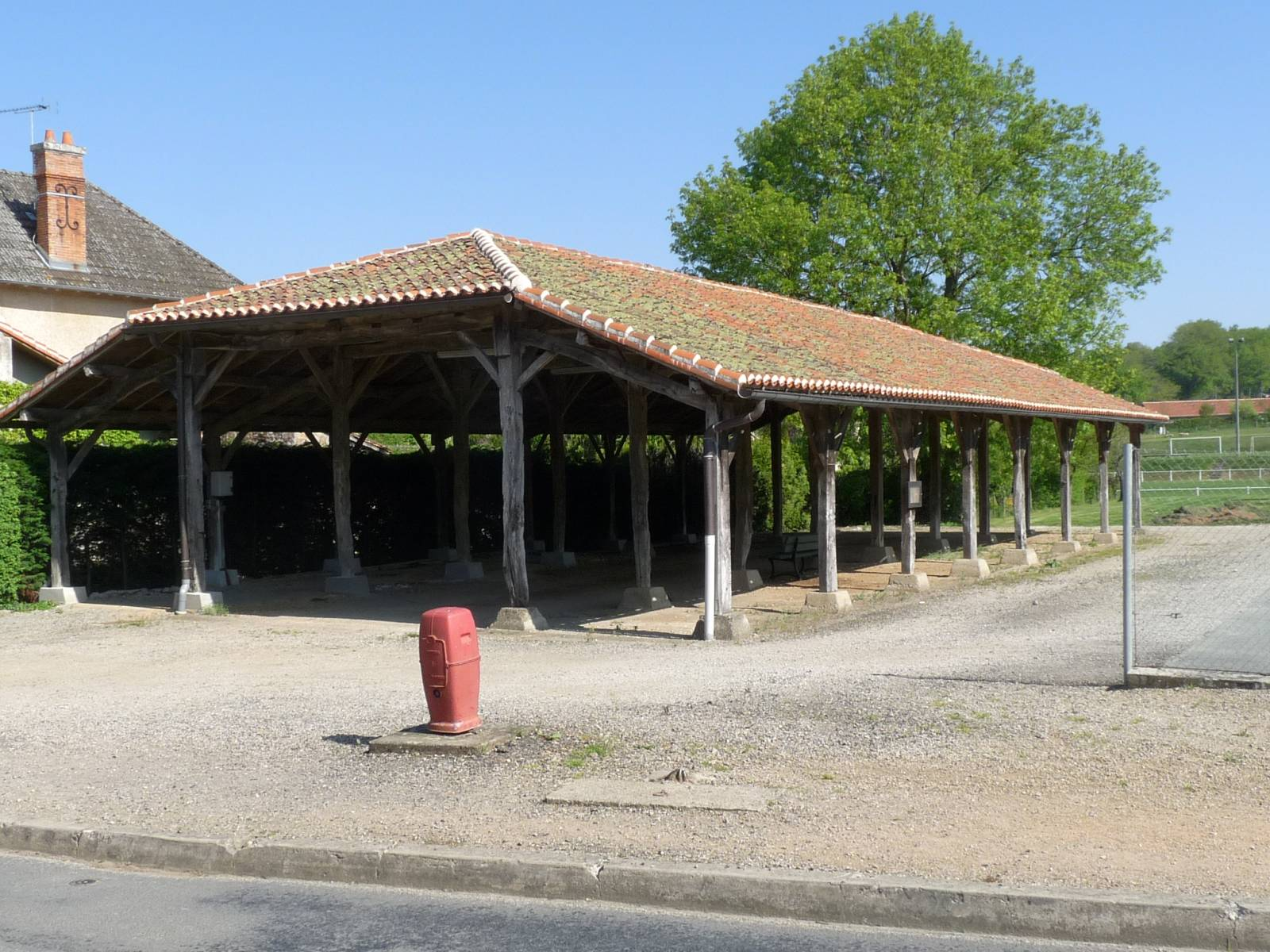
- Abzac covered market
- Location of Abzac
- Location within France Location within Nouvelle-Aquitaine
- Coordinates: 46°06′14″N 0°42′18″E
- Country: France
- Region: Nouvelle-Aquitaine
- Department: Charente
- Arrondissement: Confolens
- Canton: Charente-Vienne
- Intercommunality: Charente Limousine

Government
  - Mayor (2022–2026): Stéphane Laurent Branthome
- Area^{1}: 33.35 km^{2} (12.88 sq mi)
- Elevation: 200 m (660 ft)
- Highest elevation: 232 m (761 ft)
- Lowest elevation: 122 m (400 ft)
- Population (2023): 518
  - Density: 15.5/km^{2} (40.2/sq mi)
- Demonym(s): Abzacais, Abzacaises or Abzacois, Abzacoises
- Time zone: UTC+01:00 (CET)
  - Summer (DST): UTC+02:00 (CEST)
- INSEE/Postal code: 16001 /16500
- ^{1} French Land Register data, which excludes lakes, ponds, glaciers > 1 km^{2} (0.386 sq mi or 247 acres) and river estuaries.

Abzac (French pronunciation: [abzak]; Azac in Limousin dialect) is a commune in the Charente department in the Nouvelle-Aquitaine region of southwestern France.

== Geography ==
Abzac is located in the extreme north-east of the department of Charente and borders the communes of Availles-Limouzine, Lessac, Saint-Germain-de-Confolens, Brillac, and Oradour-Fanais. The northern border of the commune is also the border between Charente and Vienne departments.

Abzac village is at the crossroads of two roads: the D729 from Confolens in the south and continuing north to Adriers - the former route Bis from Paris to Spain and the D99 (Route de Brillac) which branches from the D951 in the south-east then continues through the village north-west to Availles-Limouzine. The D951 road passes along the southern border of the commune from Lessac in the south-west to Mezieres-sur-Issoire in the east. Other departmental minor roads pass through the commune such as the D98 from Oradour-Fanais in the east to join the D729 in the north of the commune and the D324 which branches off the D951 in the south and passes through the commune to join the D99 south of the village.

=== Hamlets and Localities ===
To the northeast of the village, the hamlet of Chardat is nicknamed the Village of Clay. This village is home to many tile and brick makers.

Other smaller hamlets are:

- In the north:
  - Chez Redon
  - Le Petit Serail
  - Le Grand Serail
  - Le Marnier
  - Le Serail
- In the south:
  - Le Queroy
  - La Pelletiere
  - Monette
  - Le Fourniou
  - Vernet
  - Les Chaumes
  - Chaumont
  - Chez Pilloux

=== Geology and terrain ===
As with the whole north-east of the department of Charente which is called Charente Limousine, the commune is located on the plateau of Limousin in the western part of the Massif Central which is composed of crystalline and metamorphic rocks - relics of the Hercynian orogeny.

A large central part of the commune of Abzac is granite. The west of the commune is composed of paragneiss and diorites. The plateau in the east of the commune is covered with alterite and degraded granite. Small areas in the north of the commune are composed of flinty clay and quartz shingle.

The commune is situated on a plateau inclined towards the west descending to the valley of the Vienne with increasingly steep slopes.

The lowest altitude is 122m along the northwestern border with Vienne and the highest is 232m to on the south-eastern border. Most of the commune is at an altitude greater than 200m.

The territory is composed of 81% agricultural land and 17% forest and semi-natural environments. The remaining 2% is shared between artificial territories and areas of water.

=== Hydrography ===
The commune is bordered in the west by the Vienne, a tributary of the Loire, and occupies the right bank. The entire commune is therefore in the Loire basin.

Many ponds dot the commune and streams connect them to the Vienne such as the Ruisseau de l'Etang de Serail in the north and the Ruisseau de l'Etang de Monette in the centre. In the south there is also the Ruisseau du Moulin de la Toueille, the Ruisseau de la Vergne, and La Curre which is the border of the commune in the south. The Ruisseau de Marcillac is the only stream to flow eastwards. It is a tributary of the Blourde which itself is a tributary of the Vienne.

=== Climate ===
The climate is degraded oceanic. This is the same as Charente Limousine but more humid and cooler than the rest of the department.

== Toponymy ==
The name Abzac has been attested in the forms Absacum in the 14th century and Azat in the 17th century.

The name Abzac is derived from the low Latin Apiciacum which is based on the Latin anthroponym Apicius with a suffix -acum of Gallic origin signifying property. Ernest Negre preferred the Latin personal name of Avitius (without mentioning the older form) followed by the same suffix.

The name of the place called le Quéroy comes from the Latin quadrivium meaning "crossroads" which probably indicated two old roads.

== History ==
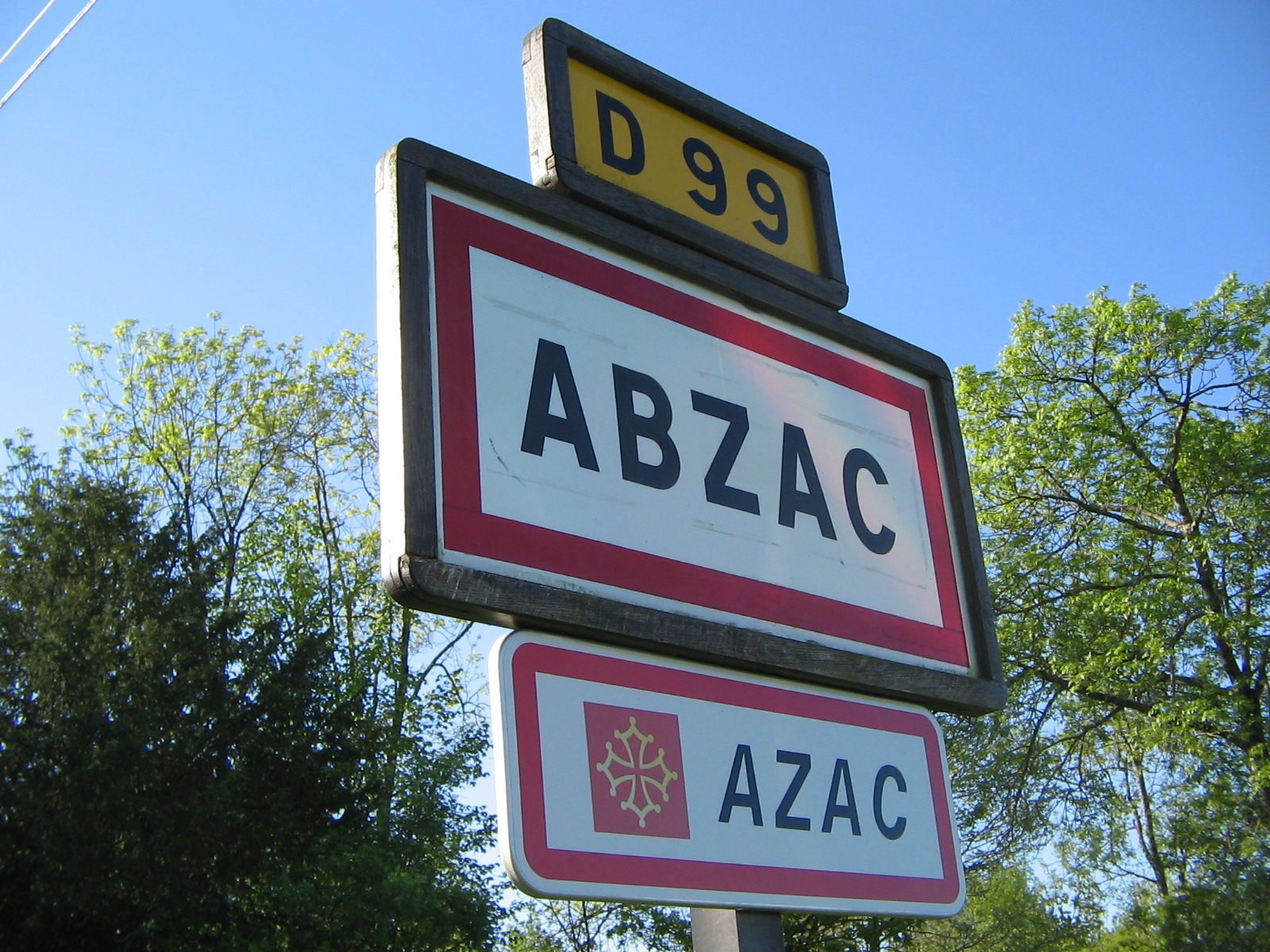
Abzac street sign in April 2011

Prehistoric remains and antiquities in Abzac indicates an ancient settlement. Abzac was part of the old province of Limousin, and the people of the village spoke the Limousin dialect.

Abzac was a former priory of the Diocese of Limoges, famous for its pilgrimage for the saints Lucius and Emerite every seven years.

In 1311 Audemar of Archiac, one of a family from Saintonge, was Lord of Saint-Germain, Availles-Limouzine and Abzac. He was also attested as lord of Abzac Aimar and Archiac in 1410 then it was Odet of Archiac in 1478 who would have built the castle. The blazon for their coat of arms was: "Gules two pales of vair, in chief of Or".

Abzac then passed to the Béraudière family whose blazon for their coat of arms was "Quarterly of Or a double-headed eagle in gules and azure, a cross of argent couped and fourchee" then the Rochechouart family which explains how it was that Françoise Athénaïs Rochechouart of Mortenart Marquise de Montespan stayed there with her brother. Their blazon was "barry wavy in Argent and gules of six" emblem is found in hearths.

== Administration ==
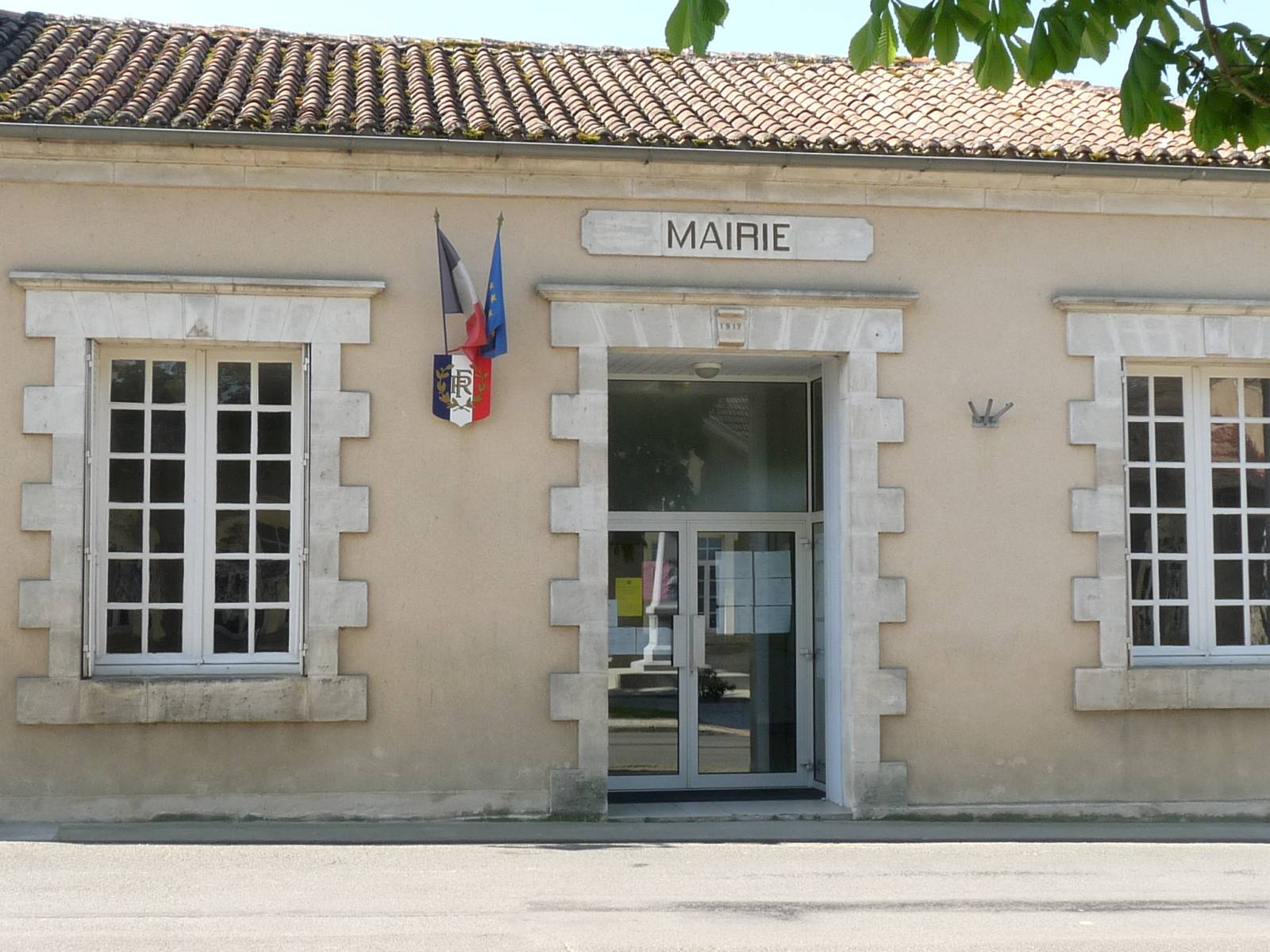
Town Hall

The commune of Abzac was founded in the Canton of Saint-Germain then became Abjac in the Canton of Confolens. In 1801 the commune returned to the name Abzac in the Canton of Confolens-Sud.

List of Successive Mayors of Abzac

From	To	Name	Party	Position
1995	2008	Noël de l'Hermite		
2008	2014	François Weller	ind.	Unemployed
2014	2022	Jean-Claude Buisson		
2022	2026	Stéphane Laurent Branthome		

== Population ==
The inhabitants of the commune are known as Abzacois or Abzacoises but can also be alternatively known as Abzacais or Abzacaises in French.

Historical population

Year	Pop.	±% p.a.
1793	1,072	—
1800	810	−3.92%
1806	1,126	+5.64%
1821	1,219	+0.53%
1831	1,204	−0.12%
1841	1,235	+0.25%
1846	1,261	+0.42%
1851	1,201	−0.97%
1856	1,238	+0.61%
1861	1,172	−1.09%
1866	1,201	+0.49%
1872	1,165	−0.51%
1876	1,177	+0.26%
1881	1,285	+1.77%
1886	1,316	+0.48%
1891	1,297	−0.29%
1896	1,252	−0.70%
1901	1,280	+0.44%

Year	Pop.	±% p.a.
1906	1,277	−0.05%
1911	1,260	−0.27%
1921	1,077	−1.56%
1926	1,097	+0.37%
1931	1,042	−1.02%
1936	1,075	+0.63%
1946	957	−1.16%
1954	950	−0.09%
1962	833	−1.63%
1968	741	−1.93%
1975	635	−2.18%
1982	556	−1.88%
1990	523	−0.76%
1999	544	+0.44%
2007	505	−0.93%
2012	486	−0.76%
2017	484	−0.08%
2023	518	+1.14%

Source: EHESS and INSEE

== Economy ==
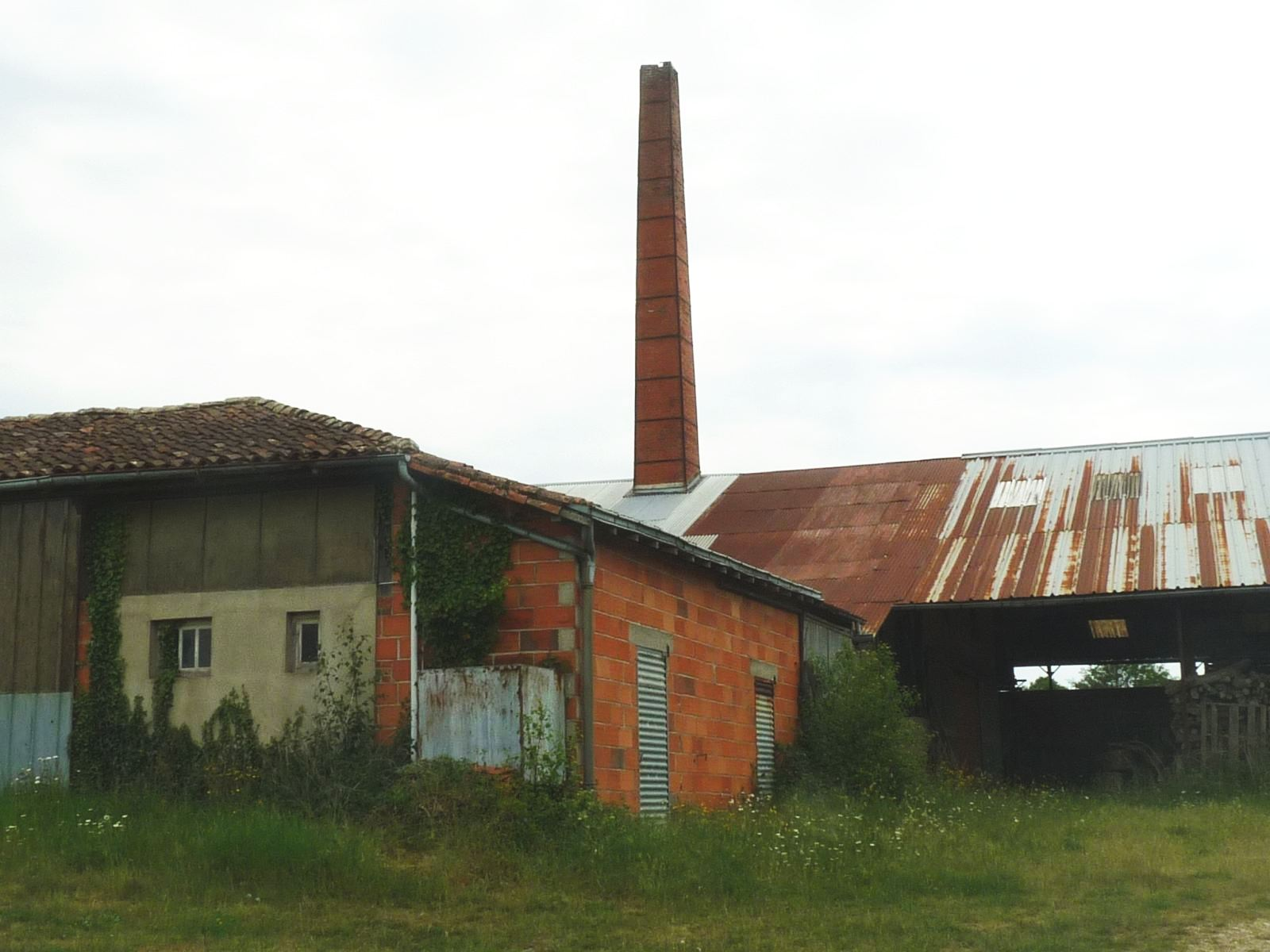
Old Brick Factory at Chardat

The Delage tile factory and Bonnaud & son brick factory, built in the early 20th century, ceased operation in 1970 and 1987 respectively.

The Malmanche tile and brick factory was built at Chardat in the 1920s and 1930s with a Hoffman kiln which was replaced in the 1970s by a tunnel kiln. Another Malmanche tile factory was built in 1979 with a gas-powered tunnel furnace, a dryer, and a continuous Unicerar press. It employed 16 people in 1989.

The Chardat Brick factory completes the industrial activity.

In trades there are two masons, one electrician, an agricultural contractor, a horticulturist, a landscaper, a mechanic, and a body shop.

== Facilities ==
=== Education ===
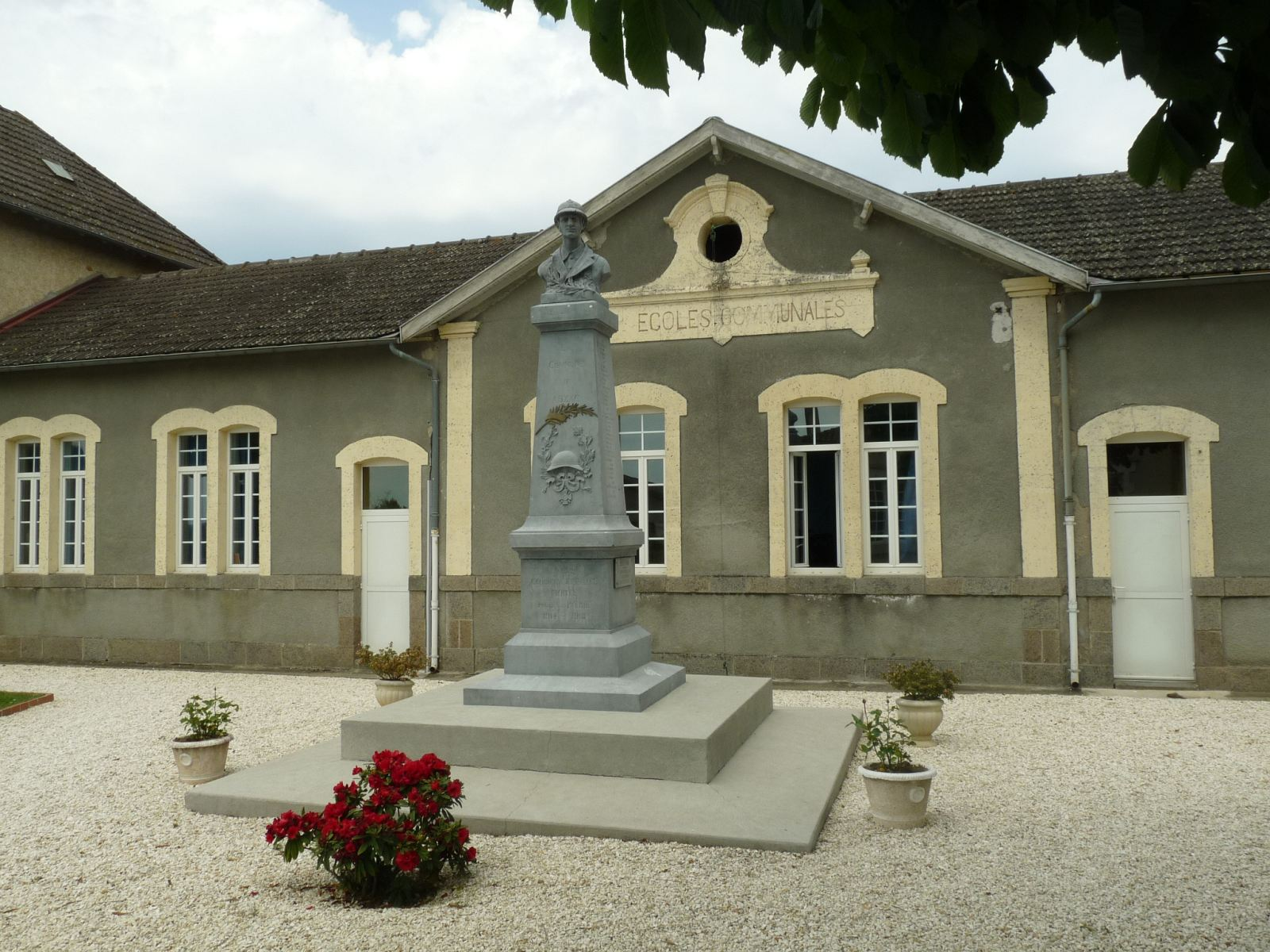
The Public School

The public elementary school is located in the village with has two classrooms. It is part of an inter-communal teaching group (RPI) which includes other schools in the communes of Brillac and Oradour-Fanais for kindergarten, and Abzac, Lesterps, and Lessac for elementary. The RPI is called Boreall. The nearest college is at Confolens.

=== Other services ===
These are found in other communes, the nearest being in Availles-Limouzine in Vienne.

== Life in Abzac ==
=== Sports ===
There are several sports clubs and associations:

- the US football club of Abzac
- the Sports Union
- the Gardon Abzaçais
- the Hunting Society

=== Other associations ===
These include the Friends of the Teching Grouping, Veterans Affairs, and the Old Peoples Club.

The association of Etang du Serail is an association with environmental objectives which aims to protect the Serail natural pond site.

The French Association of Fell Pony who promote race Fell ponies and encourage the development of a natural ecosystem.

The Brotherhood of Saints Lucius and Emeritus of Abzac was created in 2006 to bring together in a fraternal association the inhabitants of the town of Abzac and participate in the organization of the Ostensions septennial and ceremonies attached to it.

=== Festivals ===
On the 1st Sunday in August there is the employer and communal festival.

According to limousine tradition the Ostensions septennial take place in Abzac where the relics of Saints Lucius and Emeritus are venerated and conserved by the parish. The Ostensions start on Easter Monday (13 April in 2009 until 3pm).

== Culture and heritage ==
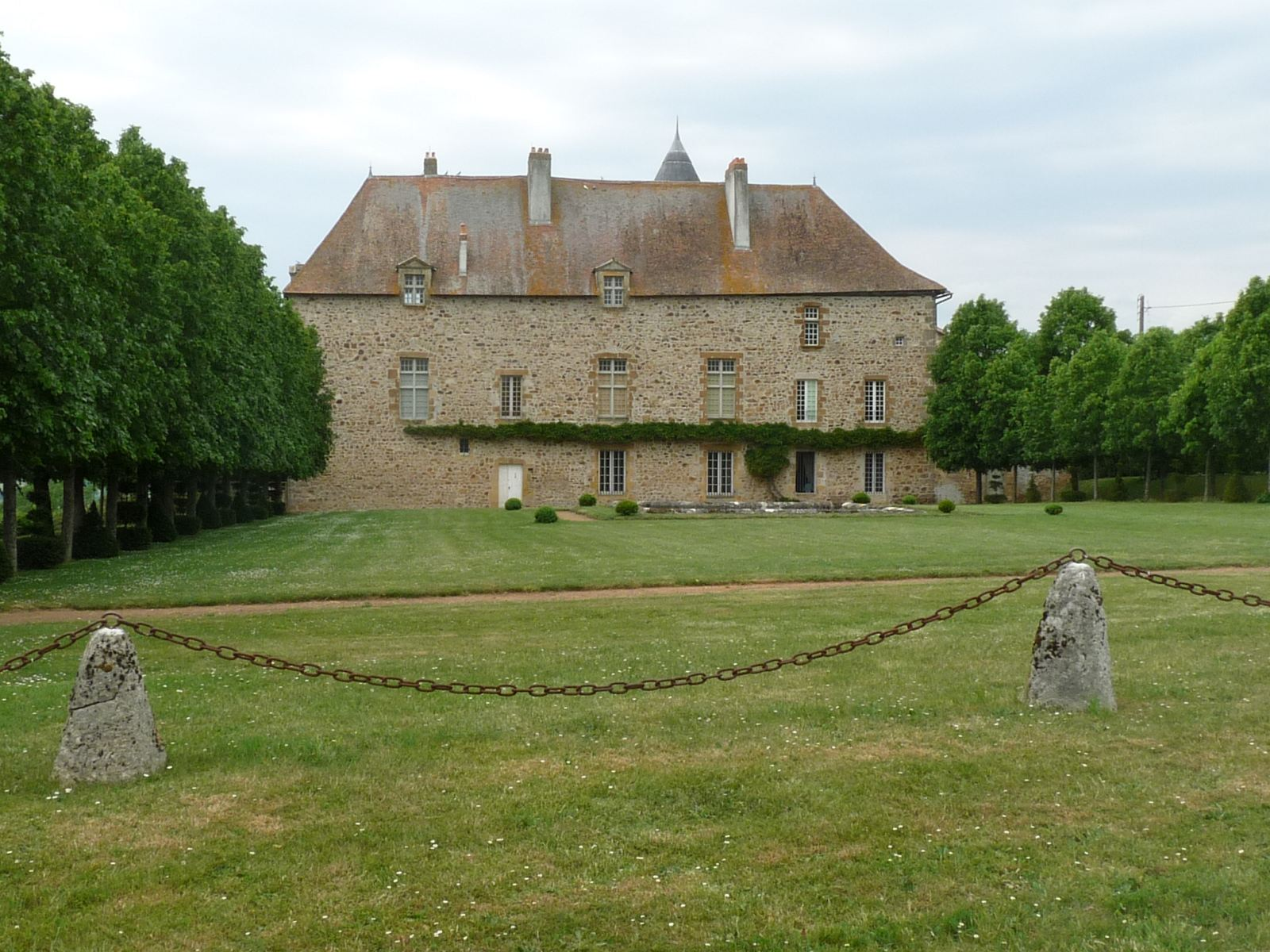
The Castle of Serre

=== Civil heritage ===
The commune has several sites that are registered as historical monuments:

- The Tuilerie Delage (Delage Tile and Brick factory) (20th century)
- The Tuilerie Bonnaud et Fils (Bonnaud and son Tile and Brick factory) (20th century)
- The Tuilerie Malmanche frères (Malmanche Brothers Tile and Brick factory) (20th century)
- The Tuilerie Malmanche (Malmanche Tile and Brick factory) (1979)
- The Chateau of Serre (15th century) was rebuilt in the 17th century. The interior has an antechamber before the Duke of Vivonne's rooms with a painted alcove. There is also a room on the second floor decorated with murals. The plaque in the fireplace in the room on the first floor displays the arms of Rochechouart-Mortemart.

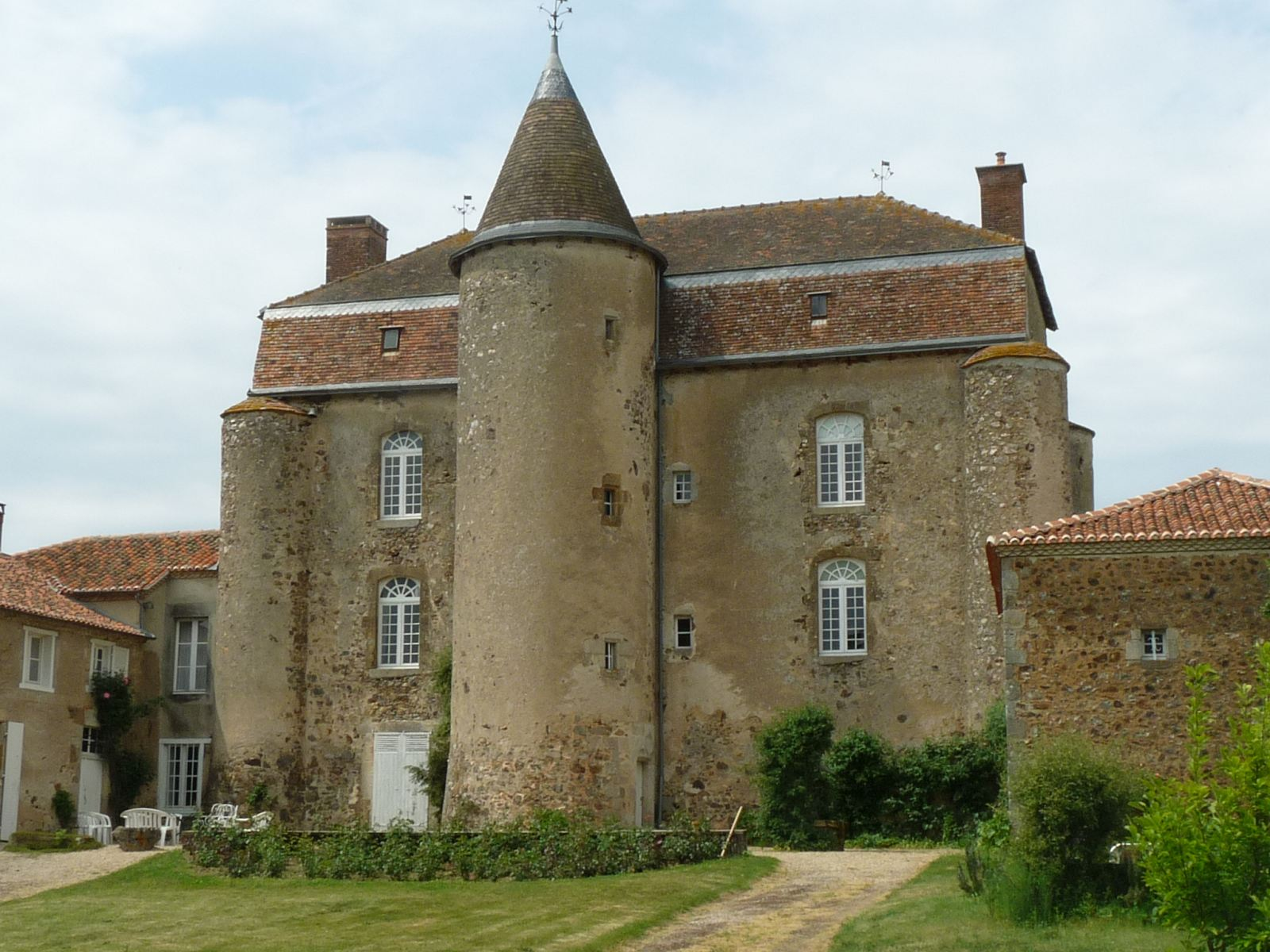
The Castle of Fayolle

Other sites of interest

- The Chateau of Fayolle has a dungeon dating to the 13th century, a round tower with stairs, a polygonal tower, and lodgings from the 18th century with a mansard roof.
- The Lodgings of Monette belonged to the Tisseuil and the Garnier de la Boissiere families. It was rebuilt in the 19th century.
- The Lodgings of Tuffas has a main building and a round tower at the gatehouse from the 17th century.
- The Rectory farm could date from the 17th century. It belonged to the Tisseuil family and was bequeathed by Marie-Philippe-Gaston Rousiers on his death in 1920 to be used as a rectory. Above a door is the inscription "19.4.1921" and "DON.G. de ROUSIERS". Today it is the rectory for the parish.
- The Lavoir (Public laundry) and Fountain at Saint Sulpice probably had healing powers and was where processions were held.

=== Religious Heritage ===
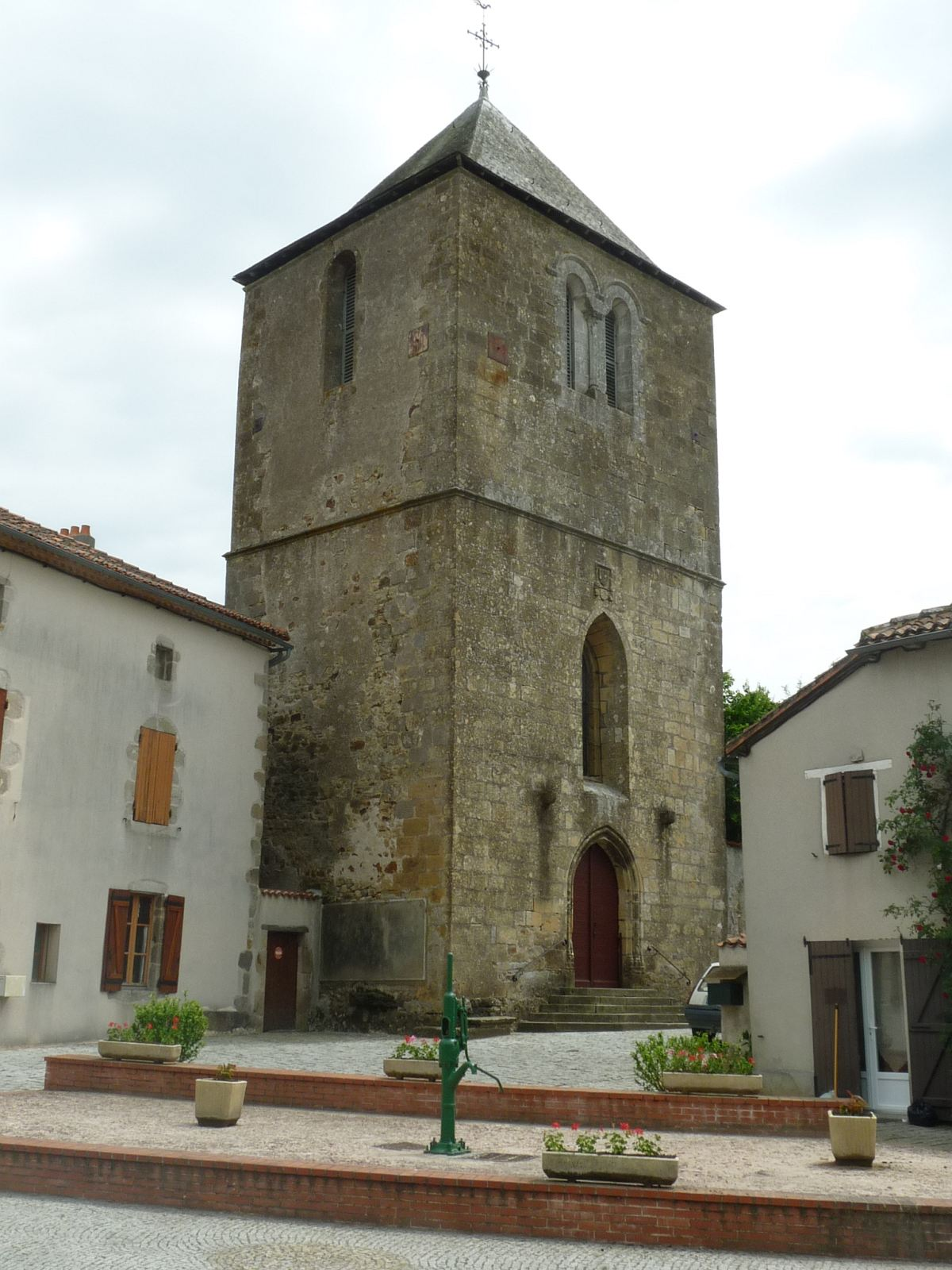
The Church

The Church of Saint-Sulpice from the 13th century is in the early Gothic style.

At the end of the Choir Enclosure, the communion table is an oak sculpture from the early 17th century. The table consists of four members including two doors. The balustrades are decorated with leaves and topped with Ionic capitals, pilasters with a foliated stand, a console, and a sculpted head. Two elements of this table are reused as a pulpit.

The relics of the saints Lucius and Emerite are preserved at Abzac. In 1670 Pope Clement IX offered to Louis Victor de Rochechouart de Mortemart, Duke of Vivonne (1636-1688), then ambassador of the King of France in Rome, the relics of Saint Lucius and Saint Emeritus, two martyrs of the primitive church. However the Duke of Vivonne, marshal of France, brother of Madame de Montespan, was the Squire of Serre at Abzac which he inherited from his mother, Diane de Grandsaigne, and it was in the chapel of Serre that the relics were of first placed where they were venerated by the people.

The relics were sent to Paris in 1758 in order to manufacture new shrines and they were divided into three parts:

- The two largest pieces were locked in two copper shrines with silver ornaments and sent to the castle of La Forge à Verrières in Poitou and are now kept at Montmorillon.
- Two small shrines sent to Manneville Castle in the Diocese of Rouen were returned to Abzac in September 1865.

"Two other large shrines of ebony thirteen to fourteen pouces (inches) long and about nine wide and ten deep which was also covered in ebony with a pyramid supporting a silver cross - also with glass framed by a silver blade - divided by a shelf covered with crimson satin" contained most of the bones of the two martyrs and were offered to the parish of Abzac in 1762 by Jean-Victor, Duke of Mortemarts (1712-1771).

On 16 July 1762 the relics were verified by Philippe Rabilhac, pastor of Oradour-Fanais, and on 26 July 1762 Monseigneur du Plessis of Argentré, Bishop of Limoges, gave Abzac parish permission to display and worship them. Since then they have been in the custody of the priest and the people of Abzac and are used, in the limousine custom, in the Ostensions septennial.

The church contains three items that are registered as historical objects:

- A Statue: Saint Roch (17th century)
- A Statue: Virgin and child (17th century)
- The Choir Enclosure (17th century)

The Church of Chardat was created in 1930 in an old house.

=== Environmental heritage ===
- The Étang du Sérail (Serail Pond)
- The Font Radareu which was used to supply the military is located on the old imperial road D951 near the hamlet of Chaumont.
- The Vienne Valley and streams for fishing.
- The Eaux d'Availles or Fontaines Salées (Waters of Availles or Salty Fountains) are located in the communes of Availles-Limouzine and Abzac on the D99 near the right bank of the Vienne. This locality has natural sources of salt water. Many wells have been drilled to do research on potential benefits of these natural waters. Revived many times in recent decades, a project for a spa complex has apparently been dropped.
- The Forest of Monette is spread across the communes of Abzac, Oradour-Fanais, and Brillac and has a small population of deer and forest birds that are rare in the region. It has the status of a Site of Community Importance with flora and fauna of type I.

== See also ==
- Communes of the Charente department

=== Bibliography ===
- Dujardin V., Moinot É., Ourry Y. (2007) - Le Confolentais, entre Poitou, Charente et Limousin, Images du patrimoine, No. 243, Geste éditions, 2007. (in French)
