= Abzac =

Abzac is the name of the following communes in France:

- Abzac, Charente, in the Charente department
- Abzac, Gironde, in the Gironde department
