= Clouère =

River in France

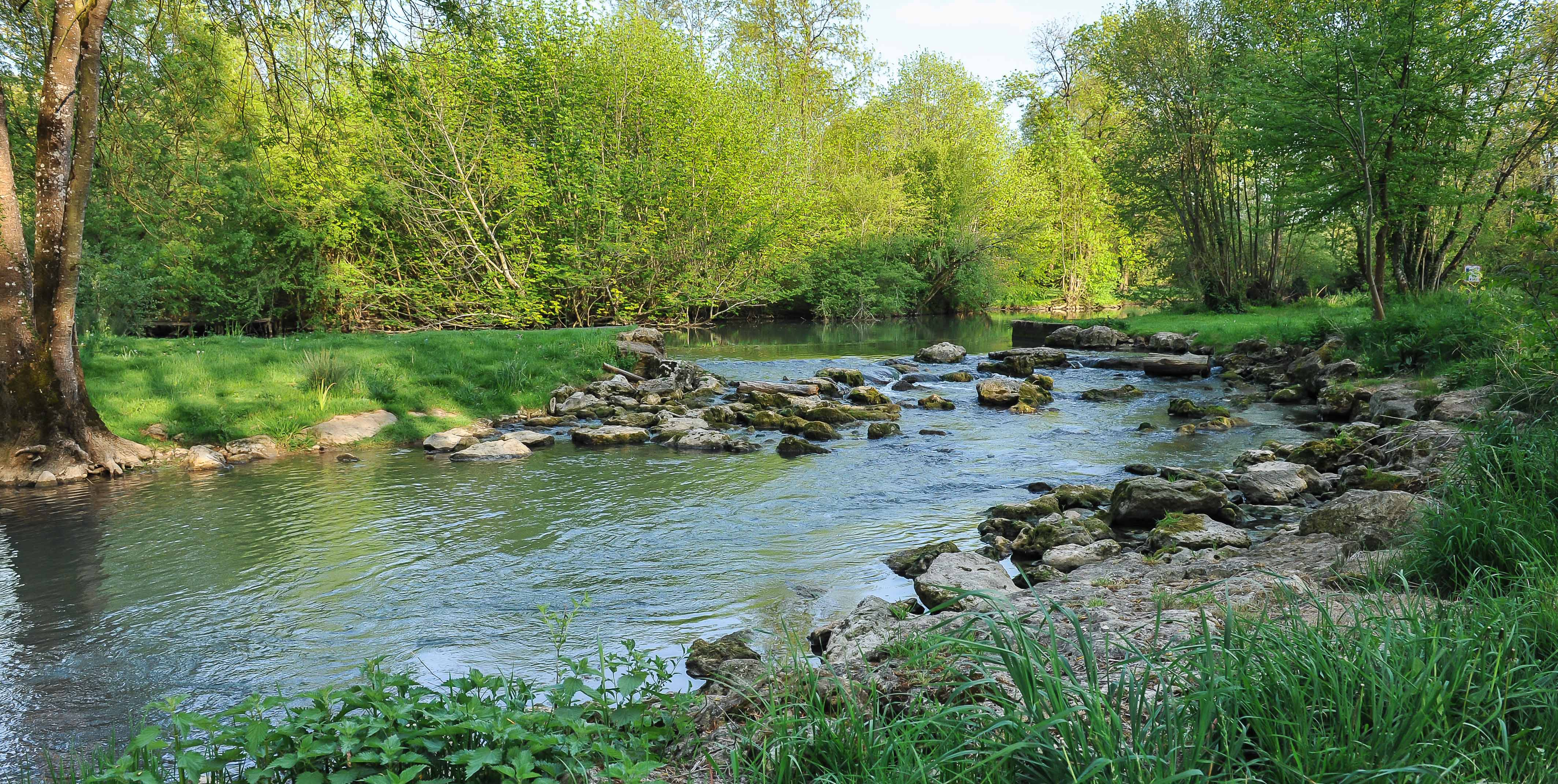

- Location within France Location within Nouvelle-Aquitaine

Location
- Country: France

Physical characteristics
- Source
  - location: Lessac
  - coordinates: 46°04′32″N 00°37′59″E
  - elevation: 210 m (690 ft)
- Mouth
  - location: Clain
  - coordinates: 46°26′18″N 00°17′09″E
  - elevation: 85 m (279 ft)
- Length: 76.3 km (47.4 mi)
- Basin size: 382 km^{2} (147 sq mi)
- Discharge
  - average: 2.55 m^{3}/s (90 cu ft/s)

Basin features
- Progression: Clain→ Vienne→ Loire→ Atlantic Ocean

The Clouère (French: la Clouère, IPA: [la kluɛʁ]) is a river that flows 76.3 km (47.4 mi) through the west-central French departments of Charente and Vienne. Its source is at Lessac, from which it flows generally northwest. It is a right tributary of the Clain, into which it flows between Château-Larcher and Aslonnes.

== Communes ==
Th Clouère flows through these communes, listed from source to mouth:

- Charente: Lessac
- Vienne: Availles-Limouzine, Pressac, Saint-Martin-l'Ars, Usson-du-Poitou, Saint-Secondin, Brion, Saint-Maurice-la-Clouère, Gençay, Marnay, Château-Larcher, Aslonnes
