= Marjorie Boulton =

British author and poet

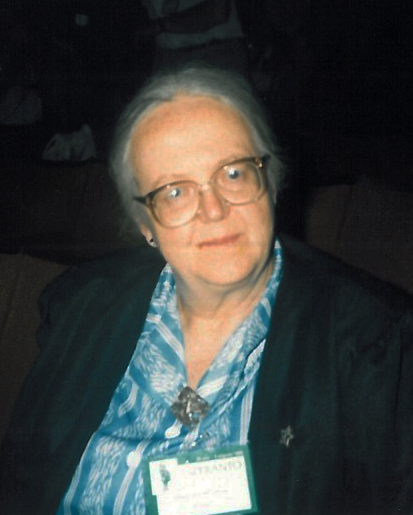
- Boulton in 1989
- Born: 7 May 1924; Teddington, Greater London, England
- Died: 30 August 2017 (aged 93)
- Occupations: Esperantist; poet; literary critic

Marjorie Boulton (7 May 1924 – 30 August 2017) was a British author and poet writing in both English and Esperanto.

== Biography ==
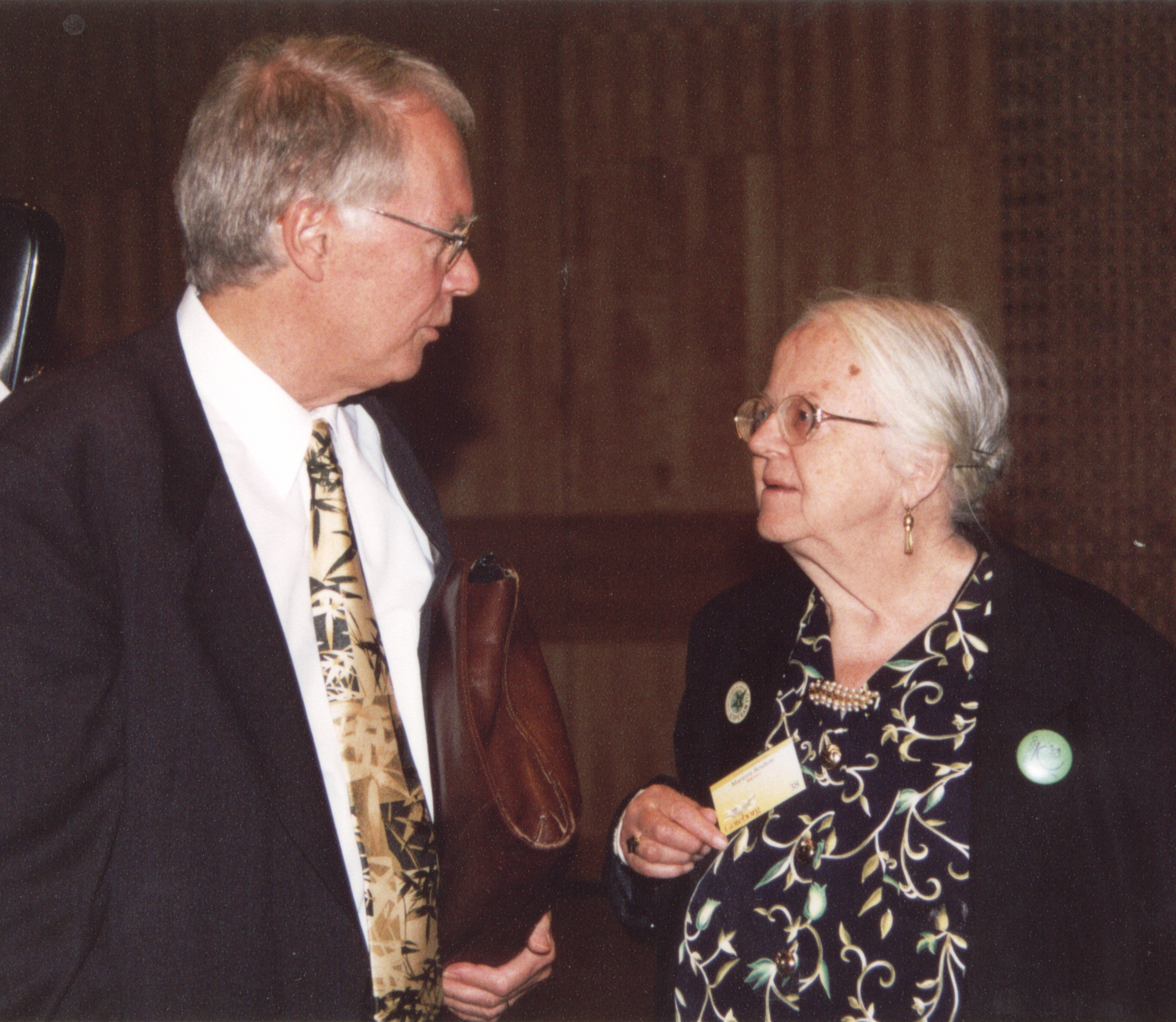
Marjorie Boulton in 2003 with Humphrey Tonkin.

Marjorie Boulton studied English at Somerville College, Oxford where she was taught by C. S. Lewis and J. R. R. Tolkien. She was a candidate for the Nobel Prize in Literature in 2008.

She taught English literature in teacher training and (from 1962 to 1970) as a college principal for 24 years before turning to full-time research and writing. She is a well-known writer in Esperanto. Boulton in her later years was president of two Esperanto organisations, Kat-amikaro and ODES.

She was the author of Zamenhof: Creator of Esperanto — a biography of L. L. Zamenhof published in 1960 by Routledge & Kegan Paul of London. She also wrote a widely used series of introductory texts on literary studies: The Anatomy of Poetry (1953), The Anatomy of Prose (1954), The Anatomy of Drama (1960), The Anatomy of Language (1968), The Anatomy of the Novel (1975) and The Anatomy of Literary Studies (1980). Her first book was Preliminaries: Poems (1949). Later books of poetry, as well as short story collections, were in Esperanto, which she learnt in 1949. She wrote as well Saying What We Mean (1959), Words in Real Life (1965) and Reading in Real Life (1971). She had also translated Harivansh Rai Bachchan's Madhushala (1935) to English.

Boulton was an active member of the Universal Esperanto Association (UEA), the Esperanto Association of Britain (EAB) and several Esperanto groups, as well as a UEA delegate, wherein she gave lectures, taught, and wrote articles.

From 1957 to 1962, she became the secretary of the International Summer University (ISU), which took place annually as part of the Esperanto World Congresses. From 1961 to 1967, she was secretary of the Esperanto World Federation (UEA) Commission for International Examination. For 25 years, she ran the summer Esperanto courses in Barlaston, south of Stoke-on-Trent. She was chairwoman of the Society of British Esperanto Teachers (1969) and a member of the Akademio de Esperanto since 1967.

== Selected publications ==
=== Works in Esperanto ===
==== Poetry collections ====
- Kontralte (1955)
- Kvarpieda kamarado (1956)
- Cent ĝojkantoj (1957)
- Eroj kaj aliaj poemoj (1959)

==== Drama ====
- Virino ĉe la landlimo (1959)
- Nia sango (1970)
- Ni aktoras (1971)

==== Short stories ====
- Dek du piedetoj (1964)
- Okuloj (1967)

=== Essays ===
- Rimleteroj (1976; with William Auld)
- Poeto fajrakora: la verkaro de Julio Baghy (1983)
- Faktoj kaj fantazioj (1984; 2nd Ed, 1993)
- Esperanta literaturo – fenomeno unika (1984)
- Ne nur leteroj al plum-amikoj (1984)
- Du el (1985; with Paul Thorsen)

=== Works in English ===
==== Poetry collections ====
- Preliminaries (1949)

==== Biography ====
- Zamenhof: Creator of Esperanto (1960; published in 1962 in Esperanto as Zamenhof, aŭtoro de Esperanto)

==== Literary criticisms ====
- The Anatomy of Poetry (1953)
- The Anatomy of Prose (1954)
- Saying What We Mean (1959)
- The Anatomy of Drama (1960)
- Words in Real Life (1965)
- The Anatomy of Language (1968)
- Reading in Real Life (1971)
- The Anatomy of the Novel (1975)
- The Anatomy of Literary Studies (1980)
