= Château-Larcher =

- Commune
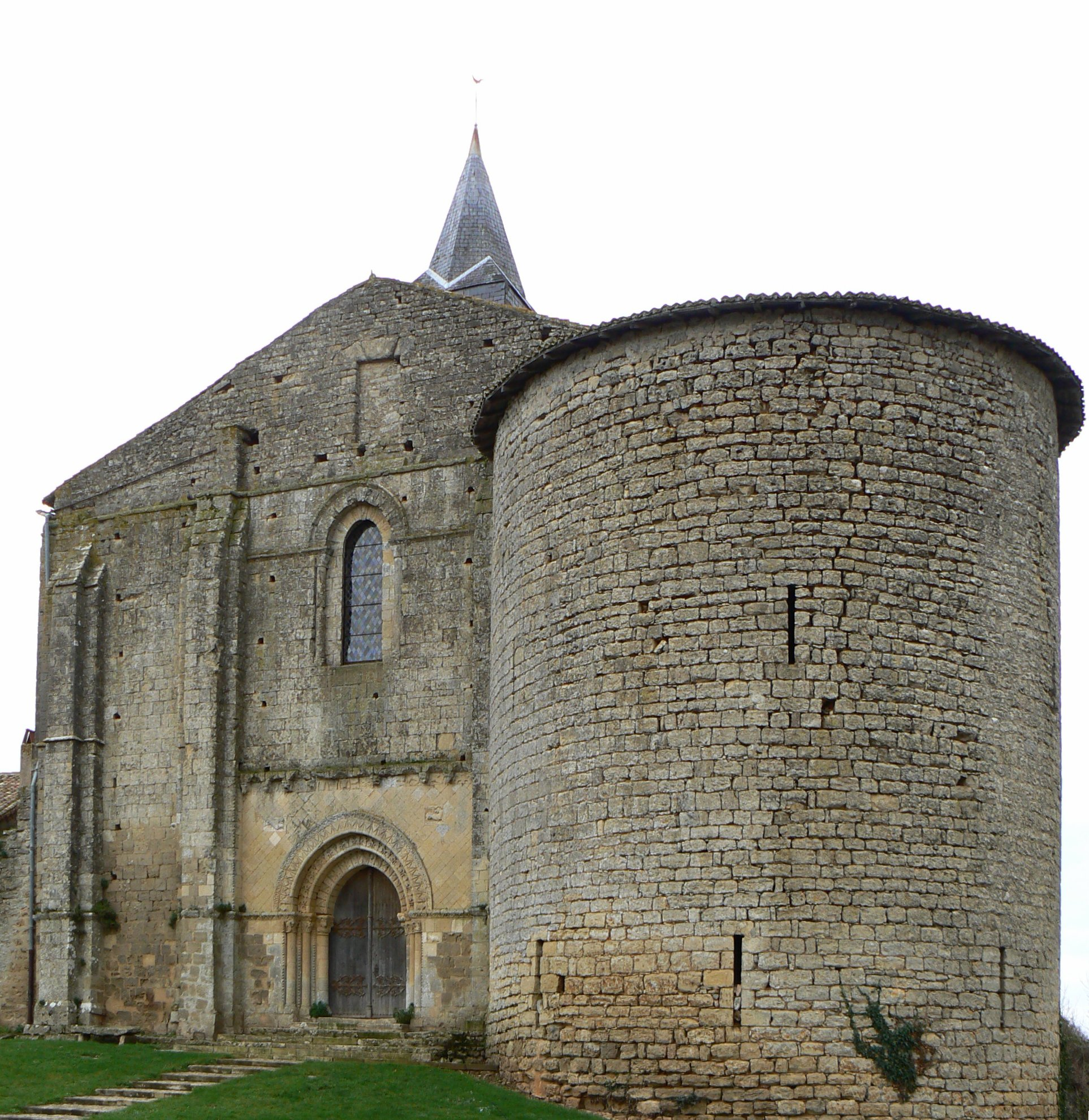
- The church in Château-Larcher
- Location of Château-Larcher
- Location within France Location within Nouvelle-Aquitaine
- Coordinates: 46°25′06″N 0°18′55″E
- Country: France
- Region: Nouvelle-Aquitaine
- Department: Vienne
- Arrondissement: Poitiers
- Canton: Vivonne

Government
  - Mayor (2020–2026): Francis Gargouil
- Area^{1}: 15.35 km^{2} (5.93 sq mi)
- Elevation: 95 m (312 ft)
- Highest elevation: 135 m (443 ft)
- Lowest elevation: 85 m (279 ft)
- Population (2023): 1,034
  - Density: 67.36/km^{2} (174.5/sq mi)
- Time zone: UTC+01:00 (CET)
  - Summer (DST): UTC+02:00 (CEST)
- INSEE/Postal code: 86065 /86370
- ^{1} French Land Register data, which excludes lakes, ponds, glaciers > 1 km^{2} (0.386 sq mi or 247 acres) and river estuaries.

Château-Larcher (French pronunciation: [ʃɑto laʁʃe]; Poitevin: Chât'lachèr / Chatelarchér) is a commune in the Vienne department in the Nouvelle-Aquitaine region in western France.

== Geography ==
The Clouère flows northwestward through the middle of the commune, forms part of its north-eastern border, then flows into the Clain, which forms its north-western border.

== See also ==
- Communes of the Vienne department
