= Luchapt =

- Commune
- Location of Luchapt
- Location within France Location within Nouvelle-Aquitaine
- Coordinates: 46°10′37″N 0°46′58″E
- Country: France
- Region: Nouvelle-Aquitaine
- Department: Vienne
- Arrondissement: Montmorillon
- Canton: Lussac-les-Châteaux

Government
  - Mayor (2020–2026): Guillaume Martin
- Area^{1}: 26.39 km^{2} (10.19 sq mi)
- Elevation: 230 m (750 ft)
- Highest elevation: 229 m (751 ft)
- Lowest elevation: 128 m (420 ft)
- Population (2023): 244
  - Density: 9.25/km^{2} (23.9/sq mi)
- Time zone: UTC+01:00 (CET)
  - Summer (DST): UTC+02:00 (CEST)
- INSEE/Postal code: 86138 /86430
- ^{1} French Land Register data, which excludes lakes, ponds, glaciers > 1 km^{2} (0.386 sq mi or 247 acres) and river estuaries.

Luchapt (French pronunciation: [lyʃa]; Occitan: Luchac) is a commune in the Vienne department in the Nouvelle-Aquitaine region in western France.

== History ==
The name Luchapt comes from the name of a Latin man, Lupius, probably derived from "lupus," meaning "wolf," augmented by the suffix -acum; thus, it translates as "the domain of Lupius."

The axe discovered at "Chez Moreau" proves occupation since the Bronze Age. Other objects from this period have been found by chance on the surface of the commune. Worked flints have also been found on the surface, again at "Chez Moreau," and are likely from the Mousterian period. A Neolithic industry (polishing stones, grinding stones, polished axes, etc.) is also well represented throughout the commune. The village's development is attributed to the Roman road on the Limoges-Poitiers axis.

Few traces remain of Luchapt's past, apart from the curious moats surrounding the islet of the "puy" and, later evidence, the beautiful houses rebuilt in the 17th and 18th centuries for noble families in Montbron, La Signe, and Villechampagne.

Luchapt welcomed the advances of the French Revolution. It planted its Liberty Tree, a symbol of the Revolution. This became the rallying point for all the festivals and major revolutionary events, such as the burning of feudal titles on November 17, 1793.

The lord of Montbron invested his capital in a forge, at the exit of the town, which ceased its activity in 1866.

== See also ==
- Communes of the Vienne department
