= Saint-Laurent-de-Jourdes =

- Commune
- Location of Saint-Laurent-de-Jourdes
- Location within France Location within Nouvelle-Aquitaine
- Coordinates: 46°23′33″N 0°32′42″E
- Country: France
- Region: Nouvelle-Aquitaine
- Department: Vienne
- Arrondissement: Montmorillon
- Canton: Lussac-les-Châteaux

Government
  - Mayor (2020–2026): Raynald Costet
- Area^{1}: 17.96 km^{2} (6.93 sq mi)
- Elevation: 125 m (410 ft)
- Highest elevation: 141 m (463 ft)
- Lowest elevation: 103 m (338 ft)
- Population (2023): 192
  - Density: 10.7/km^{2} (27.7/sq mi)
- Time zone: UTC+01:00 (CET)
  - Summer (DST): UTC+02:00 (CEST)
- INSEE/Postal code: 86228 /86410
- ^{1} French Land Register data, which excludes lakes, ponds, glaciers > 1 km^{2} (0.386 sq mi or 247 acres) and river estuaries.

Saint-Laurent-de-Jourdes (French pronunciation: [sɛ̃ loʁɑ̃ də ʒuʁd]) is a commune in the Vienne department in the Nouvelle-Aquitaine region in western France.

== See also ==
- Communes of the Vienne department
