= Gouex =

- Commune
- Location of Gouex
- Location within France Location within Nouvelle-Aquitaine
- Coordinates: 46°22′01″N 0°41′28″E
- Country: France
- Region: Nouvelle-Aquitaine
- Department: Vienne
- Arrondissement: Montmorillon
- Canton: Lussac-les-Châteaux

Government
  - Mayor (2020–2026): Claude Daviaud
- Area^{1}: 18.16 km^{2} (7.01 sq mi)
- Elevation: 134 m (440 ft)
- Highest elevation: 142 m (466 ft)
- Lowest elevation: 71 m (233 ft)
- Population (2023): 487
  - Density: 26.8/km^{2} (69.5/sq mi)
- Time zone: UTC+01:00 (CET)
  - Summer (DST): UTC+02:00 (CEST)
- INSEE/Postal code: 86107 /86320
- ^{1} French Land Register data, which excludes lakes, ponds, glaciers > 1 km^{2} (0.386 sq mi or 247 acres) and river estuaries.

Gouex (French pronunciation: [gwɛks]) is a commune in the Vienne department in the Nouvelle-Aquitaine region in western France.

== See also ==
- Communes of the Vienne department
