= Persac =

- Commune
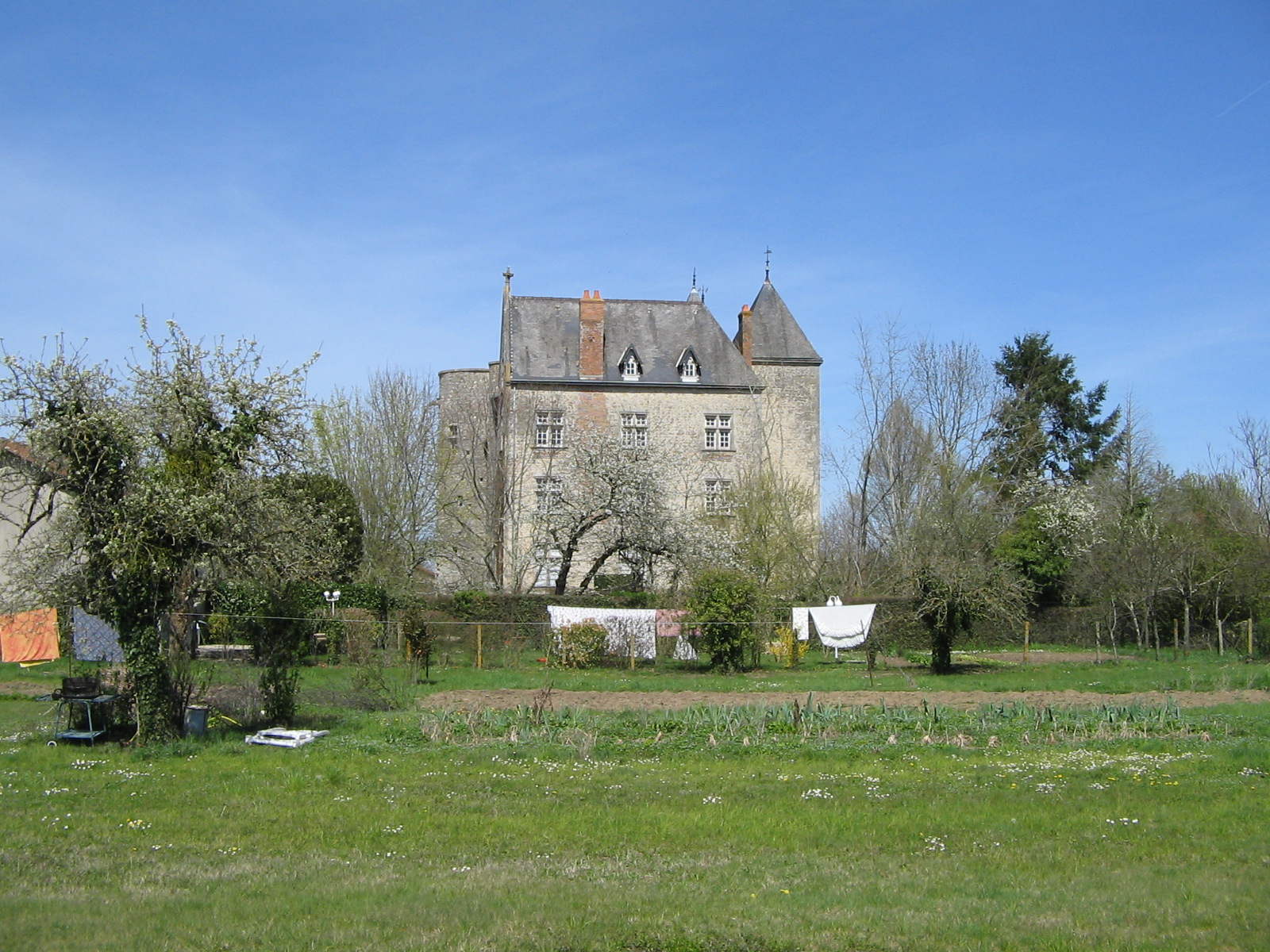
- The chateau in Persac
- Location of Persac
- Location within France Location within Nouvelle-Aquitaine
- Coordinates: 46°20′42″N 0°42′23″E
- Country: France
- Region: Nouvelle-Aquitaine
- Department: Vienne
- Arrondissement: Montmorillon
- Canton: Lussac-les-Châteaux
- Intercommunality: Vienne et Gartempe

Government
  - Mayor (2020–2026): Régis Sirot
- Area^{1}: 59.41 km^{2} (22.94 sq mi)
- Elevation: 86 m (282 ft)
- Highest elevation: 196 m (643 ft)
- Lowest elevation: 72 m (236 ft)
- Population (2023): 717
  - Density: 12.1/km^{2} (31.3/sq mi)
- Time zone: UTC+01:00 (CET)
  - Summer (DST): UTC+02:00 (CEST)
- INSEE/Postal code: 86190 /86320
- ^{1} French Land Register data, which excludes lakes, ponds, glaciers > 1 km^{2} (0.386 sq mi or 247 acres) and river estuaries.

Persac (French pronunciation: [pɛʁsak]) is a commune in the Vienne department in the Nouvelle-Aquitaine region in western France.

== See also ==
- Communes of the Vienne department
