= Asnières-sur-Blour =

Asnières-sur-Blour Asnieras (Occitan)
- Commune
- Location of Asnières-sur-Blour
- Location within France Location within Nouvelle-Aquitaine
- Coordinates: 46°09′54″N 0°48′04″E
- Country: France
- Region: Nouvelle-Aquitaine
- Department: Vienne
- Arrondissement: Montmorillon
- Canton: Lussac-les-Châteaux
- Intercommunality: CC Vienne Gartempe

Government
  - Mayor (2020–2026): Maryse Legrand
- Area^{1}: 32.49 km^{2} (12.54 sq mi)
- Elevation: 210 m (690 ft)
- Highest elevation: 232 m (761 ft)
- Lowest elevation: 163 m (535 ft)
- Population (2023): 193
  - Density: 5.94/km^{2} (15.4/sq mi)
- Time zone: UTC+01:00 (CET)
  - Summer (DST): UTC+02:00 (CEST)
- INSEE/Postal code: 86011 /86430
- ^{1} French Land Register data, which excludes lakes, ponds, glaciers > 1 km^{2} (0.386 sq mi or 247 acres) and river estuaries.

Asnières-sur-Blour (French: [ɑnjɛʁ syʁ bluʁ]; Occitan: Asnieras) is a commune in the Vienne department in the Nouvelle-Aquitaine region in western France. The commune has 180 inhabitants (2019).

Asnières-sur-Blour is located roughly halfway between the cities of Limoges and Poitiers. Its land is formed by a 3 percent of steep and grisp valleys, 38% of clay soils in the Seuil du Poitou upland, pink granite soils (21%), diorite soils (22%) and leucogranite soils (22%) in the surrounding "hillock arch". The land is skimed by a 15 chilometers fluviale creek of which 5 km belongs to the French river Blourde. The climate is oceanic with moderate hot and dry summers, slowly raining in the fall and with no excessively cold winters.

== Toponymy ==
The toponym derives from the Latin word asinus and the suffix -aria to mean what has a concern or is a place of donkeys. Probably, the name is due to the presence of various mills which were steered by a high number of mules.

== Economy ==
The main source of employment is agriculture, mainly sheep farming. Of a complex farming surface which as of 2010 amounted to 2,590 hectares, 20% was used for the cultivation of common wheat and hordeum, 50% to forage and 23% for grass. From 2000 to 2010 the number of farm animals more than doubled increasing from 942 to 1,732 units, so as to become the main economic activity of the area and to constitute one of the most important herd of the Vienne Department which in 2011 counted 48,000 registered farm animals. As a part of a more general trend diffused in the whole region which in the 1990-2007 had lost the 43& of the numerosity of its sheep solely destined to the production of meat for human consumption, the number of ovine resources fell from 9,128 to 7,614 units between 2000 and 2010. Poultry farming ended in 2010.

== Landscape ==
In 1965 a French Revolution wood of freedom was hammered at the border with the departments of Charente and Haute-Vienne. According to the local inventory of the remarkable trees updated by the Poitou-Charentes administration, the town hosts a pedunculate oak.

The Asnières basins are protected under the EU Habitats Directive and the land delimited by Villedon, Ecluseaux and the mills of Asnières belongs to a natural area of ecological, faunal and floristic interest (in French: Zone naturelle d'intérêt écologique, faunistique et floristique).

== See also ==
- Communes of the Vienne department
