= Saint-Secondin =

- Commune
- Location of Saint-Secondin
- Location within France Location within Nouvelle-Aquitaine
- Coordinates: 46°19′44″N 0°29′38″E
- Country: France
- Region: Nouvelle-Aquitaine
- Department: Vienne
- Arrondissement: Montmorillon
- Canton: Lussac-les-Châteaux

Government
  - Mayor (2020–2026): Jean-Louis Bourriaux
- Area^{1}: 38.14 km^{2} (14.73 sq mi)
- Elevation: 130 m (430 ft)
- Highest elevation: 149 m (489 ft)
- Lowest elevation: 115 m (377 ft)
- Population (2023): 531
  - Density: 13.9/km^{2} (36.1/sq mi)
- Time zone: UTC+01:00 (CET)
  - Summer (DST): UTC+02:00 (CEST)
- INSEE/Postal code: 86248 /86350
- ^{1} French Land Register data, which excludes lakes, ponds, glaciers > 1 km^{2} (0.386 sq mi or 247 acres) and river estuaries.

Saint-Secondin (French pronunciation: [sɛ̃ səɡɔ̃dɛ̃]) is a commune in the Vienne department in the Nouvelle-Aquitaine region in western France.

== Geography ==
The village lies in the middle of the commune, on the right bank of the Clouère, which flows northwest through the commune.

== See also ==
- Communes of the Vienne department
