= Mouterre-sur-Blourde =

- Commune
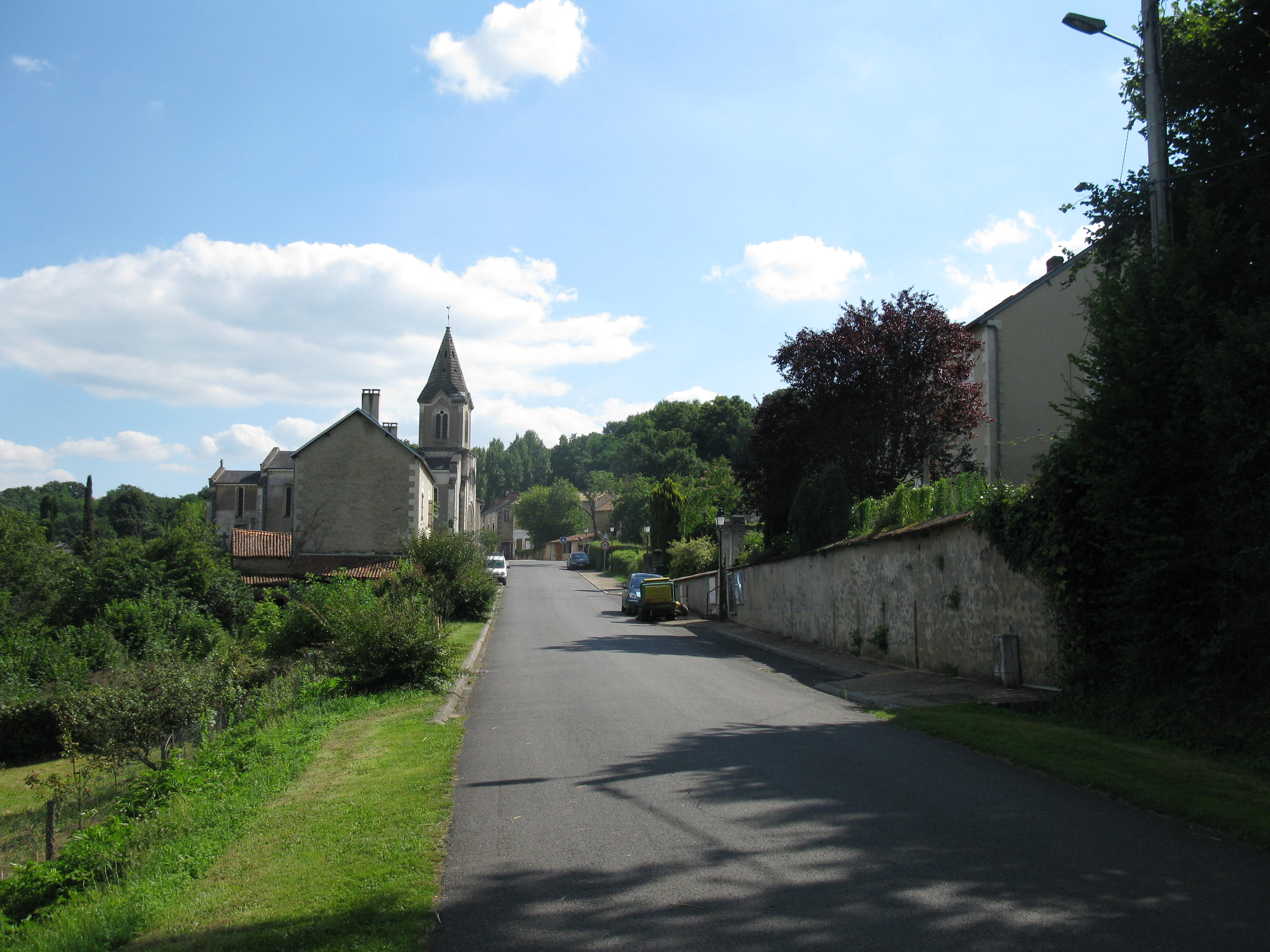
- The road into Mouterre
- Location of Mouterre-sur-Blourde
- Location within France Location within Nouvelle-Aquitaine
- Coordinates: 46°12′10″N 0°45′18″E
- Country: France
- Region: Nouvelle-Aquitaine
- Department: Vienne
- Arrondissement: Montmorillon
- Canton: Lussac-les-Châteaux

Government
  - Mayor (2020–2026): Jean-Marie Batlle
- Area^{1}: 20.18 km^{2} (7.79 sq mi)
- Elevation: 150 m (490 ft)
- Highest elevation: 219 m (719 ft)
- Lowest elevation: 122 m (400 ft)
- Population (2023): 170
  - Density: 8.4/km^{2} (22/sq mi)
- Time zone: UTC+01:00 (CET)
  - Summer (DST): UTC+02:00 (CEST)
- INSEE/Postal code: 86172 /86430
- ^{1} French Land Register data, which excludes lakes, ponds, glaciers > 1 km^{2} (0.386 sq mi or 247 acres) and river estuaries.

Mouterre-sur-Blourde (French pronunciation: [mutɛʁ syʁ bluʁd]; Occitan: Moterra) is a commune in the Vienne department in the Nouvelle-Aquitaine region in western France.

== See also ==
- Communes of the Vienne department
