= Millac =

- Commune
- Location of Millac
- Location within France Location within Nouvelle-Aquitaine
- Coordinates: 46°11′26″N 0°41′17″E
- Country: France
- Region: Nouvelle-Aquitaine
- Department: Vienne
- Arrondissement: Montmorillon
- Canton: Lussac-les-Châteaux

Government
  - Mayor (2020–2026): Bernard Savard
- Area^{1}: 40.59 km^{2} (15.67 sq mi)
- Elevation: 196 m (643 ft)
- Highest elevation: 216 m (709 ft)
- Lowest elevation: 98 m (322 ft)
- Population (2023): 462
  - Density: 11.4/km^{2} (29.5/sq mi)
- Time zone: UTC+01:00 (CET)
  - Summer (DST): UTC+02:00 (CEST)
- INSEE/Postal code: 86159 /86150
- ^{1} French Land Register data, which excludes lakes, ponds, glaciers > 1 km^{2} (0.386 sq mi or 247 acres) and river estuaries.

Millac (French pronunciation: [mijak]; Occitan: Milhac) is a commune in the Vienne department in the Nouvelle-Aquitaine region in western France.

== See also ==
- Communes of the Vienne department
