= Saint-Maurice-la-Clouère =

- Commune
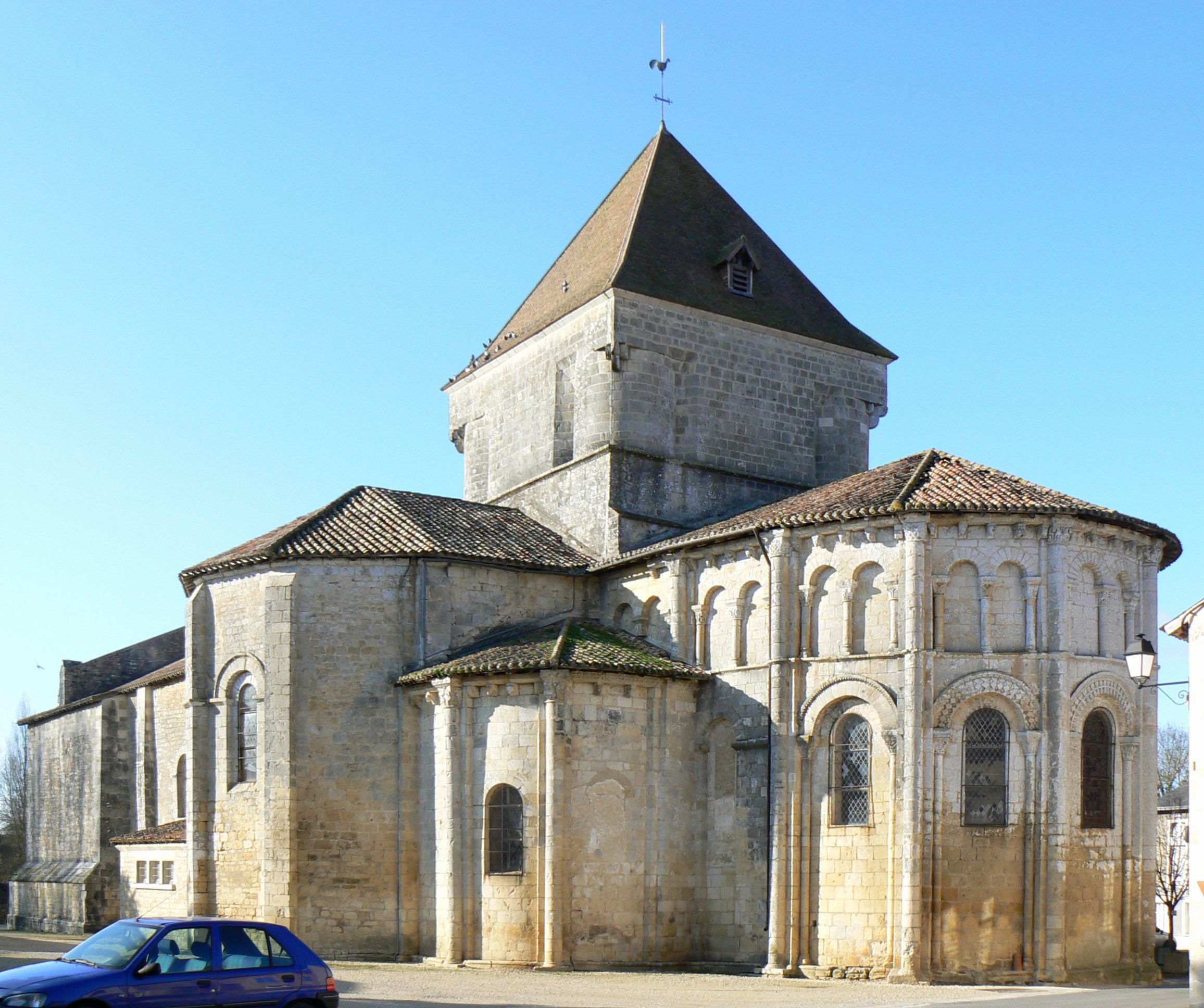
- The Church of Saint-Maurice
- Location of Saint-Maurice-la-Clouère
- Location within France Location within Nouvelle-Aquitaine
- Coordinates: 46°22′47″N 0°24′46″E
- Country: France
- Region: Nouvelle-Aquitaine
- Department: Vienne
- Arrondissement: Montmorillon
- Canton: Lussac-les-Châteaux

Government
  - Mayor (2020–2026): Laurent Doret
- Area^{1}: 39.60 km^{2} (15.29 sq mi)
- Elevation: 130 m (430 ft)
- Highest elevation: 139 m (456 ft)
- Lowest elevation: 105 m (344 ft)
- Population (2023): 1,290
  - Density: 32.6/km^{2} (84.4/sq mi)
- Time zone: UTC+01:00 (CET)
  - Summer (DST): UTC+02:00 (CEST)
- INSEE/Postal code: 86235 /86160
- ^{1} French Land Register data, which excludes lakes, ponds, glaciers > 1 km^{2} (0.386 sq mi or 247 acres) and river estuaries.

Saint-Maurice-la-Clouère (French pronunciation: [sɛ̃ mɔʁis la klu.ɛʁ]) is a commune in the Vienne department in the Nouvelle-Aquitaine region in western France.

== Geography ==
The village lies on the right bank of the Clouère, which forms the commune's southwestern border.

== See also ==
- Communes of the Vienne department
