= International League of Esperanto-Speaking Teachers =

The International League of Esperanto-Speaking Teachers (Esperanto: Internacia Ligo de Esperantistaj Instruistoj, ILEI) is a non-governmental organization with the goals of teaching respect for humanity, life and nature and seeking to further mutual understanding among peoples. Advocating the spread of Esperanto language and culture, the NGO publishes books and journals, organizes international conferences and administers examinations worldwide to certify the qualifications of Esperanto teachers.

Specifically, ILEI is a special interest group affiliated with both UNESCO and the Universal Esperanto Association (UEA). It aims to introduce the Esperanto language into schools at all levels; to teach Esperanto across all subject areas and levels; to research and solve pedagogical problems in language education; to publish modern tutorials, magazines, books and pamphlets; to organize international conferences and seminars, etc.; to oversee international exams for certifying individuals' abilities in speaking and teaching Esperanto; to partner with governmental and educational institutions, as well as with other organizations whose goals accord with those of ILEI; and to establish and maintain websites and discussion lists to further these aims.

== History ==
Founded in 1949, the first executive council included Violet C. Nixon, (United Kingdom, president), Einar Dahl (Sweden, secretary-treasurer), Jeanne Dedieu (France) and P. Korte (Netherlands). Subsequent ILEI presidents have included István Szerdahelyi (1985–1988), Edward Symoens (1988–1991), Stefan MacGill (1991–1993), Duncan Charters (1993–1998), Mauro La Torre (1998–2003), Radojica Petrovic (2003–2009); Stefan MacGill (2009-2013) and Mireille Grosjean (2013-)

== Revues ==
The League edits 2 revues. Both are quarterly and in CMYK color model.

- Internacia Pedagogia Revuo, international pedagogical revue, is the official organ of the League. This revue has as target audience all teachers, especially language teachers.
- Juna Amiko, young friend, is a revue for learners and for children, who grow in Esperanto-speaking families, it means they are native speakers. Native Esperanto speakers (Esperanto: denaskuloj or denaskaj esperantistoj) are people who have acquired Esperanto as one of their native languages. From the age of 8 to 10 they can read this newspaper Juna Amiko and discover countries, persons, songs, games and quizzies.

== Conferences ==
ILEI holds conferences, usually every year, with particular themes devoted to culture, tourism and linguistic festivals; most conferences have been in Europe, though Cuba, South Korea, Australia, Japan and Benin have also hosted conferences.

Year	Host city	Host country	Theme
2019	Čačak	Serbia	Learning in virtual communities
2018	Madrid	Spain	The cultural heritage of Esperantoi
2017	Busan	South Korea	From education to respectful tourism
2016	Nyíregyháza	Hungary	New Ways of Learning
2015	Ostend	Belgium	A great peace after the major wars
2014	Montevideo	Uruguay	Language justice in practice: Latin-American experiences and tendencies
2013	Herzberg-Sieber	Germany	Teaching Esperanto to all generations’’
2012	Kunming	China	
2011	Copenhagen	Denmark	
2010	Matanzas	Cuba	UNESCO's International Year for the Rapprochement of Cultures
2009	Kraków	Poland	Esperanto pedagogy facing intercultural communication challenges
2008	Porto-Novo	Benin	Esperanto teachers for planet Earth
2007	Ranzan	Japan	Women in Esperanto culture
2006	Parma	Italy	Language rights, language learning, education for all
2005	Kaunas	Lithuania	
2004	Bratislava	Slovakia	
2003	Örestrand (Höganäs)	Sweden	
2002	(No meeting held)		
2001	Lovran	Croatia	Strengthening Esperanto instruction and intercultural education
2000	Bouresse	France	
1999	Karlovy Vary	Czech Republic	Peace through education
1998	Montpellier	France	Linguistic instruction, a bridge to the world
1997	Lara	Australia	Multiculturalism and language acquisition
1996	Tábor	Czech Republic	Esperanto learning and self-teaching methods
1995	Övik (Porvoo)	Finland	Propaedeutic value of Esperanto
1994	Gangnam-gu	South Korea	Asian contributions to world education and culture
1993	Valencia	Spain	Academic value of Esperanto teaching
1992	Bratislava	Slovakia	Methodus linguarum novissima
1991	Voss	Norway	Tyresö and Rauma — now what?
1990	Santa Clara	Cuba	National norms and the teaching of Esperanto
1989	Caerleon	Wales	Motivation for school teaching of Esperanto
1988	Kerkrade	Netherlands	Traditional and modern methods of Esperanto instruction
1987	Łódź	Poland	Pedagogic, didactic and linguistic policies to Esperanto
1986	Louvain-la-Neuve	Belgium	Peace
1985	Kungälv	Sweden	English, yes; Esperanto, yes; languages as partners
1984	Škofja Loka	Slovenia	Esperanto and foreign-language instruction
1983	Sintra	Portugal	Ethnic minorities and Esperanto
1982	Seiano	Italy	The liberating principle of Esperanto in education
1981	Gödöllő	Hungary	Social and linguistic role of Esperanto for education
1980	Cottonera	Malta	Esperanto as a bridge to international understanding
1979	Locarno	Switzerland	Children and language
1978	Gorizia	Italy	Perspectives on teaching
1977	Luxembourg	Luxembourg	Cultural value of Esperanto
1976	San Marino	San Marino	Not races, but children live in the world
