= Moussac, Vienne =

Moussac
- Commune
- Location of Moussac
- Location within France Location within Nouvelle-Aquitaine
- Coordinates: 46°16′55″N 0°41′17″E
- Country: France
- Region: Nouvelle-Aquitaine
- Department: Vienne
- Arrondissement: Montmorillon
- Canton: Lussac-les-Châteaux

Government
  - Mayor (2020–2026): Daniel Bourgoin
- Area^{1}: 24.69 km^{2} (9.53 sq mi)
- Elevation: 98 m (322 ft)
- Highest elevation: 184 m (604 ft)
- Lowest elevation: 80 m (260 ft)
- Population (2023): 436
  - Density: 17.7/km^{2} (45.7/sq mi)
- Time zone: UTC+01:00 (CET)
  - Summer (DST): UTC+02:00 (CEST)
- INSEE/Postal code: 86171 /86150
- ^{1} French Land Register data, which excludes lakes, ponds, glaciers > 1 km^{2} (0.386 sq mi or 247 acres) and river estuaries.

Moussac (French pronunciation: [musak]) is a commune in the Vienne department in the Nouvelle-Aquitaine region in western France.

== See also ==
- Communes of the Vienne department
