= Pressac =

- Commune
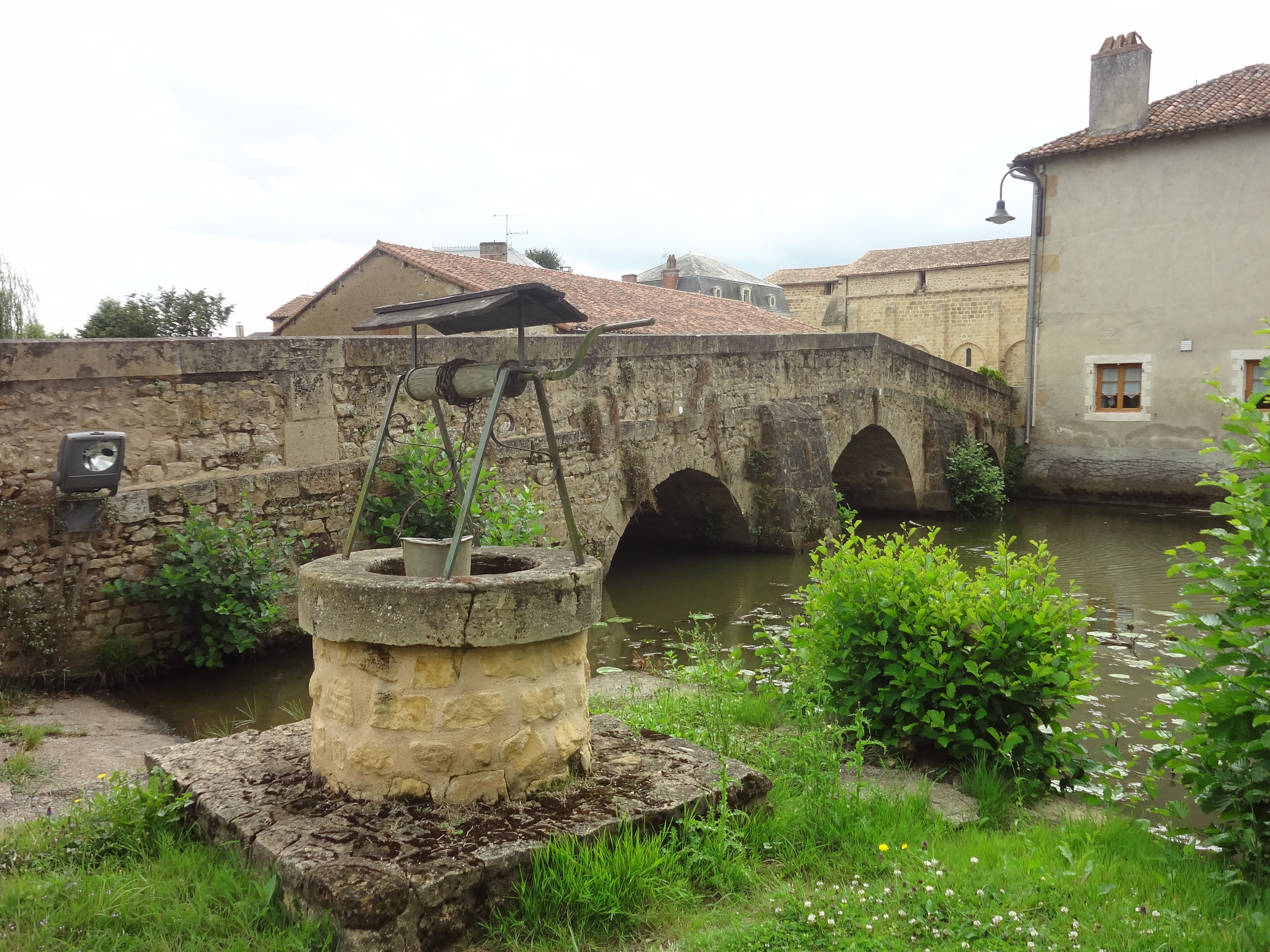
- The old bridge, the old well and the Clain river, in Pressac
- Location of Pressac
- Location within France Location within Nouvelle-Aquitaine
- Coordinates: 46°07′00″N 0°34′18″E
- Country: France
- Region: Nouvelle-Aquitaine
- Department: Vienne
- Arrondissement: Montmorillon
- Canton: Civray

Government
  - Mayor (2020–2026): Gérard Huguenaud
- Area^{1}: 49.21 km^{2} (19.00 sq mi)
- Elevation: 162 m (531 ft)
- Highest elevation: 216 m (709 ft)
- Lowest elevation: 141 m (463 ft)
- Population (2023): 544
  - Density: 11.1/km^{2} (28.6/sq mi)
- Time zone: UTC+01:00 (CET)
  - Summer (DST): UTC+02:00 (CEST)
- INSEE/Postal code: 86200 /86460
- ^{1} French Land Register data, which excludes lakes, ponds, glaciers > 1 km^{2} (0.386 sq mi or 247 acres) and river estuaries.

Pressac (French pronunciation: [pʁɛsak]) is a commune in the Vienne department in the Nouvelle-Aquitaine region in western France.

== Geography ==
The Clouère forms the commune's north-eastern border, and the Clain flows northward through the middle of the commune and crosses the village.

== See also ==
- Communes of the Vienne department
