= Canton of Lussac-les-Châteaux =

Coordinates: 46.40°N 0.72°E

The canton of Lussac-les-Châteaux is an administrative division of the Vienne department, western France. Its borders were modified at the French canton reorganisation which came into effect in March 2015. Its seat is in Lussac-les-Châteaux.

It consists of the following communes:

1. Adriers
2. Asnières-sur-Blour
3. Bouresse
4. Brion
5. Civaux
6. Gençay
7. Gouex
8. L'Isle-Jourdain
9. Lhommaizé
10. Luchapt
11. Lussac-les-Châteaux
12. Mazerolles
13. Millac
14. Moussac
15. Mouterre-sur-Blourde
16. Nérignac
17. Persac
18. Queaux
19. Saint-Laurent-de-Jourdes
20. Saint-Maurice-la-Clouère
21. Saint-Secondin
22. Sillars
23. Usson-du-Poitou
24. Verrières
25. Le Vigeant
