= Nérignac =

- Commune
- Location of Nérignac
- Location within France Location within Nouvelle-Aquitaine
- Coordinates: 46°17′45″N 0°43′41″E
- Country: France
- Region: Nouvelle-Aquitaine
- Department: Vienne
- Arrondissement: Montmorillon
- Canton: Lussac-les-Châteaux

Government
  - Mayor (2020–2026): Marc Dailler
- Area^{1}: 4.46 km^{2} (1.72 sq mi)
- Elevation: 211 m (692 ft)
- Highest elevation: 198 m (650 ft)
- Lowest elevation: 108 m (354 ft)
- Population (2023): 112
  - Density: 25.1/km^{2} (65.0/sq mi)
- Time zone: UTC+01:00 (CET)
  - Summer (DST): UTC+02:00 (CEST)
- INSEE/Postal code: 86176 /86150
- ^{1} French Land Register data, which excludes lakes, ponds, glaciers > 1 km^{2} (0.386 sq mi or 247 acres) and river estuaries.

Nérignac (French pronunciation: [neʁiɲak]) is a commune in the Vienne department in the Nouvelle-Aquitaine region in western France.

== See also ==
- Communes of the Vienne department
