= Usson-du-Poitou =

- Commune
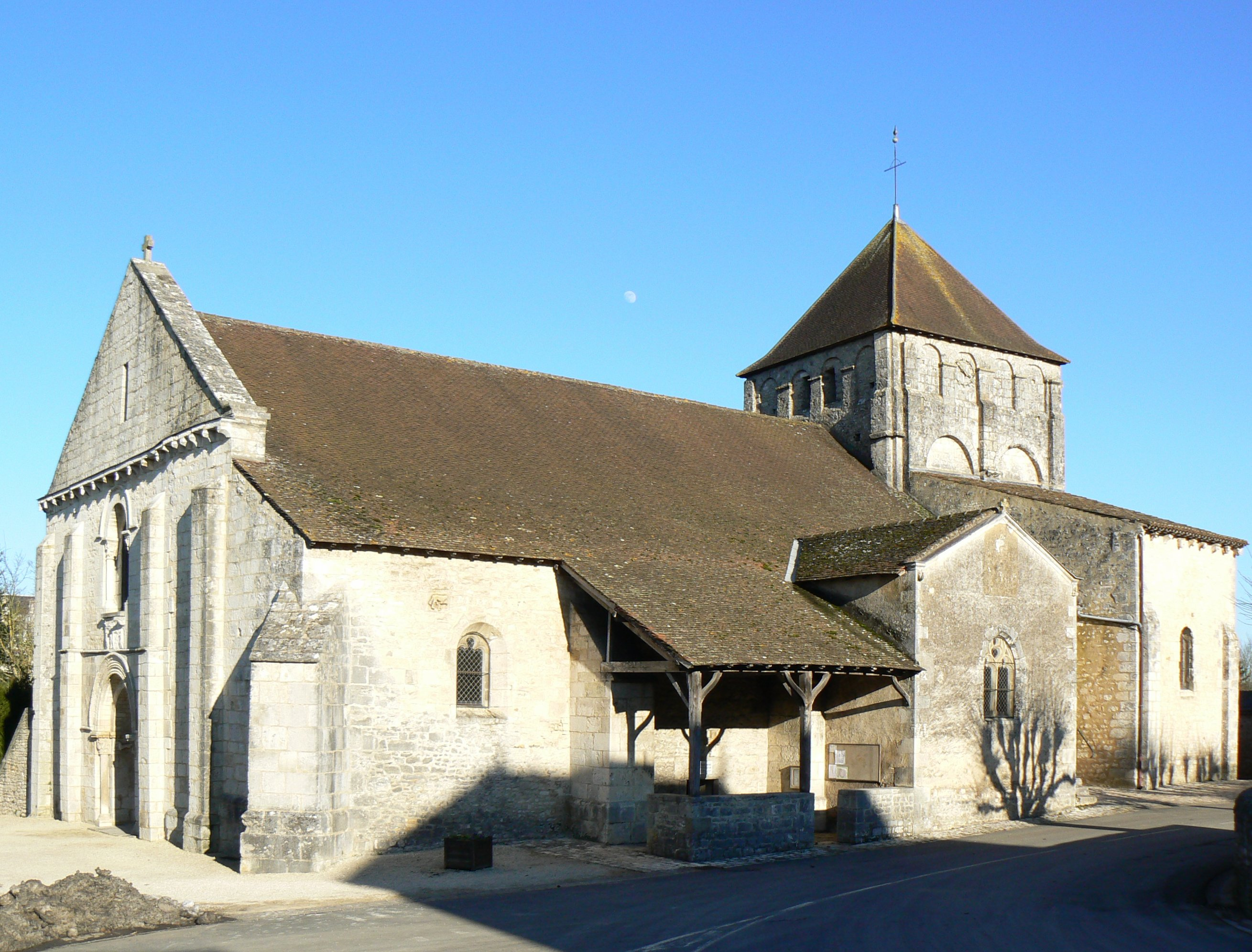
- The church of Saint-Pierre and Saint-Paul, in Usson-du-Poitou

- Coat of arms
- Location of Usson-du-Poitou
- Location within France Location within Nouvelle-Aquitaine
- Coordinates: 46°16′43″N 0°31′44″E
- Country: France
- Region: Nouvelle-Aquitaine
- Department: Vienne
- Arrondissement: Montmorillon
- Canton: Lussac-les-Châteaux
- Intercommunality: Vienne et Gartempe

Government
  - Mayor (2020–2026): Michel Jarrassier
- Area^{1}: 72.64 km^{2} (28.05 sq mi)
- Elevation: 133 m (436 ft)
- Highest elevation: 161 m (528 ft)
- Lowest elevation: 118 m (387 ft)
- Population (2023): 1,217
  - Density: 16.75/km^{2} (43.39/sq mi)
- Time zone: UTC+01:00 (CET)
  - Summer (DST): UTC+02:00 (CEST)
- INSEE/Postal code: 86276 /86350
- ^{1} French Land Register data, which excludes lakes, ponds, glaciers > 1 km^{2} (0.386 sq mi or 247 acres) and river estuaries.

Usson-du-Poitou (French pronunciation: [ysɔ̃ dy pwatu], literally Usson of the Poitou) is a commune in the Vienne department in the Nouvelle-Aquitaine region in western France.

== Geography ==
The Clouère flows north through the middle of the commune and crosses the village.

== See also ==
- Communes of the Vienne department
