= Gençay =

- Commune
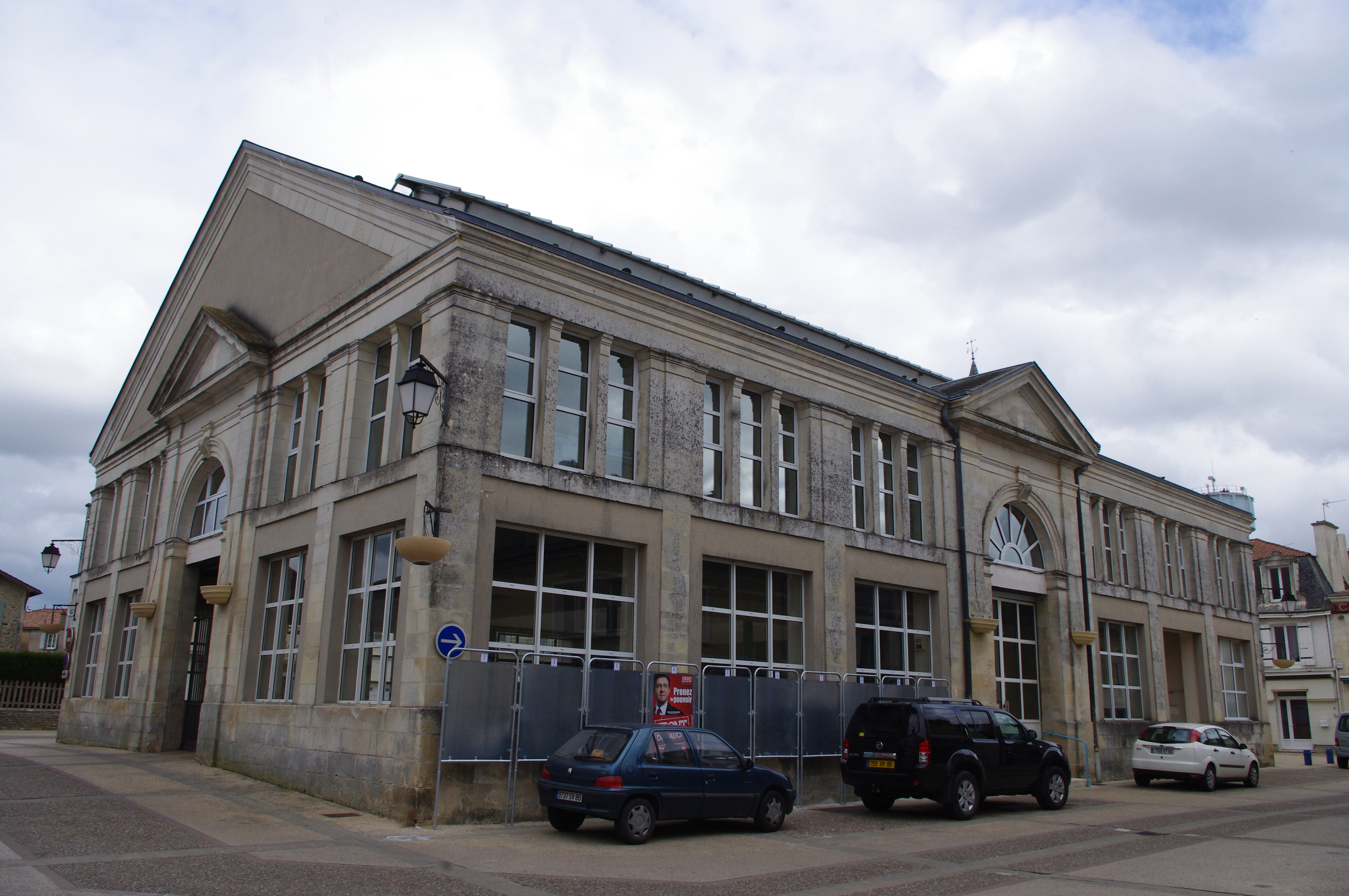
- The town hall, in Gençay

- Coat of arms
- Location of Gençay
- Location within France Location within Nouvelle-Aquitaine
- Coordinates: 46°22′24″N 0°24′21″E
- Country: France
- Region: Nouvelle-Aquitaine
- Department: Vienne
- Arrondissement: Montmorillon
- Canton: Lussac-les-Châteaux
- Intercommunality: Civraisien en Poitou

Government
  - Mayor (2020–2026): François Bock
- Area^{1}: 4.74 km^{2} (1.83 sq mi)
- Elevation: 125 m (410 ft)
- Highest elevation: 138 m (453 ft)
- Lowest elevation: 105 m (344 ft)
- Population (2023): 1,653
  - Density: 349/km^{2} (903/sq mi)
- Time zone: UTC+01:00 (CET)
  - Summer (DST): UTC+02:00 (CEST)
- INSEE/Postal code: 86103 /86160
- ^{1} French Land Register data, which excludes lakes, ponds, glaciers > 1 km^{2} (0.386 sq mi or 247 acres) and river estuaries.

Gençay (French pronunciation: [ʒɑ̃sɛ]) is a commune in the Vienne department in the Nouvelle-Aquitaine region in western France. The inhabitants are called Gencéens.

== Geography ==
The village lies on the left bank of the Clouère, which forms the commune's northern border.

== Twin towns ==
- Breckerfeld, Northern Rhine-Westphalia, Germany

== See also ==
- Communes of the Vienne department
