= Adriers =

- Commune
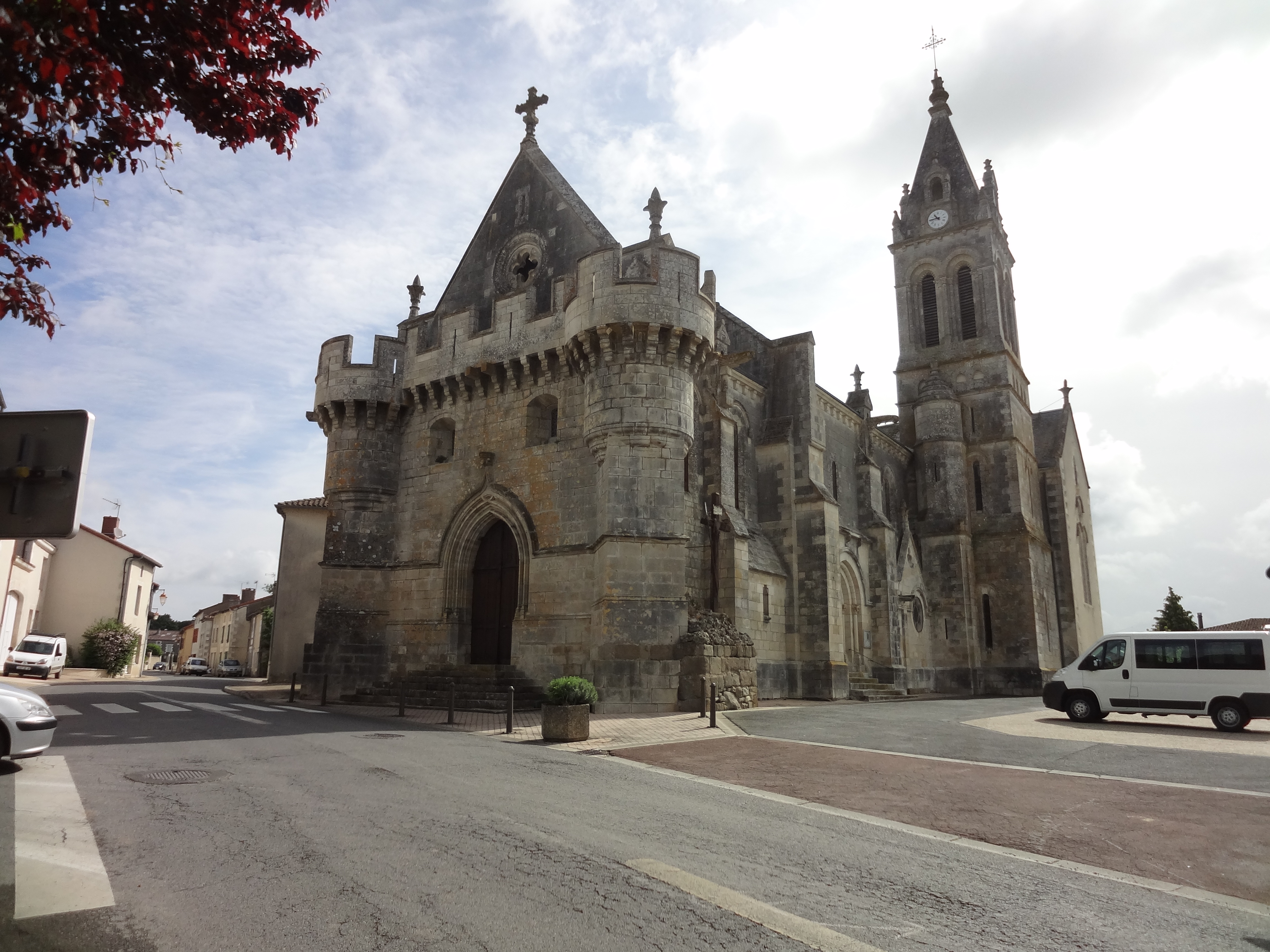
- Location of Adriers
- Location within France Location within Nouvelle-Aquitaine
- Coordinates: 46°15′28″N 0°47′54″E
- Country: France
- Region: Nouvelle-Aquitaine
- Department: Vienne
- Arrondissement: Montmorillon
- Canton: Lussac-les-Châteaux
- Intercommunality: Vienne et Gartempe

Government
  - Mayor (2020–2026): Thierry Rolle-Milaguet
- Area^{1}: 68.09 km^{2} (26.29 sq mi)
- Elevation: 200 m (660 ft)
- Highest elevation: 231 m (758 ft)
- Lowest elevation: 110 m (360 ft)
- Population (2023): 698
  - Density: 10.3/km^{2} (26.6/sq mi)
- Time zone: UTC+01:00 (CET)
  - Summer (DST): UTC+02:00 (CEST)
- INSEE/Postal code: 86001 /86430
- ^{1} French Land Register data, which excludes lakes, ponds, glaciers > 1 km^{2} (0.386 sq mi or 247 acres) and river estuaries.

Adriers (French pronunciation: [adʁije]) is a commune in the Vienne department in the Nouvelle-Aquitaine region in western France.

== Population ==
Historical population
Year	Pop.	±% p.a.
1968	1,042	—
1975	900	−2.07%
1982	938	+0.59%
1990	833	−1.47%
1999	797	−0.49%
2007	732	−1.06%
2012	727	−0.14%
2017	719	−0.22%
2023	698	−0.49%
Source: INSEE

== See also ==
- Communes of the Vienne department
