= Bouresse =

- Commune
- Location of Bouresse
- Location within France Location within Nouvelle-Aquitaine
- Coordinates: 46°21′45″N 0°36′34″E
- Country: France
- Region: Nouvelle-Aquitaine
- Department: Vienne
- Arrondissement: Montmorillon
- Canton: Lussac-les-Châteaux

Government
  - Mayor (2020–2026): Jean-Claude Luteau
- Area^{1}: 36.62 km^{2} (14.14 sq mi)
- Elevation: 122 m (400 ft)
- Highest elevation: 160 m (520 ft)
- Lowest elevation: 112 m (367 ft)
- Population (2023): 620
  - Density: 17/km^{2} (44/sq mi)
- Time zone: UTC+01:00 (CET)
  - Summer (DST): UTC+02:00 (CEST)
- INSEE/Postal code: 86034 /86410
- ^{1} French Land Register data, which excludes lakes, ponds, glaciers > 1 km^{2} (0.386 sq mi or 247 acres) and river estuaries.

Bouresse (French pronunciation: [buʁɛs]) is a commune in the Vienne department in the Nouvelle-Aquitaine region in western France. It has a population of 584 (2017).

== See also ==
- Communes of the Vienne department
