= Availles-Limouzine =

- Commune
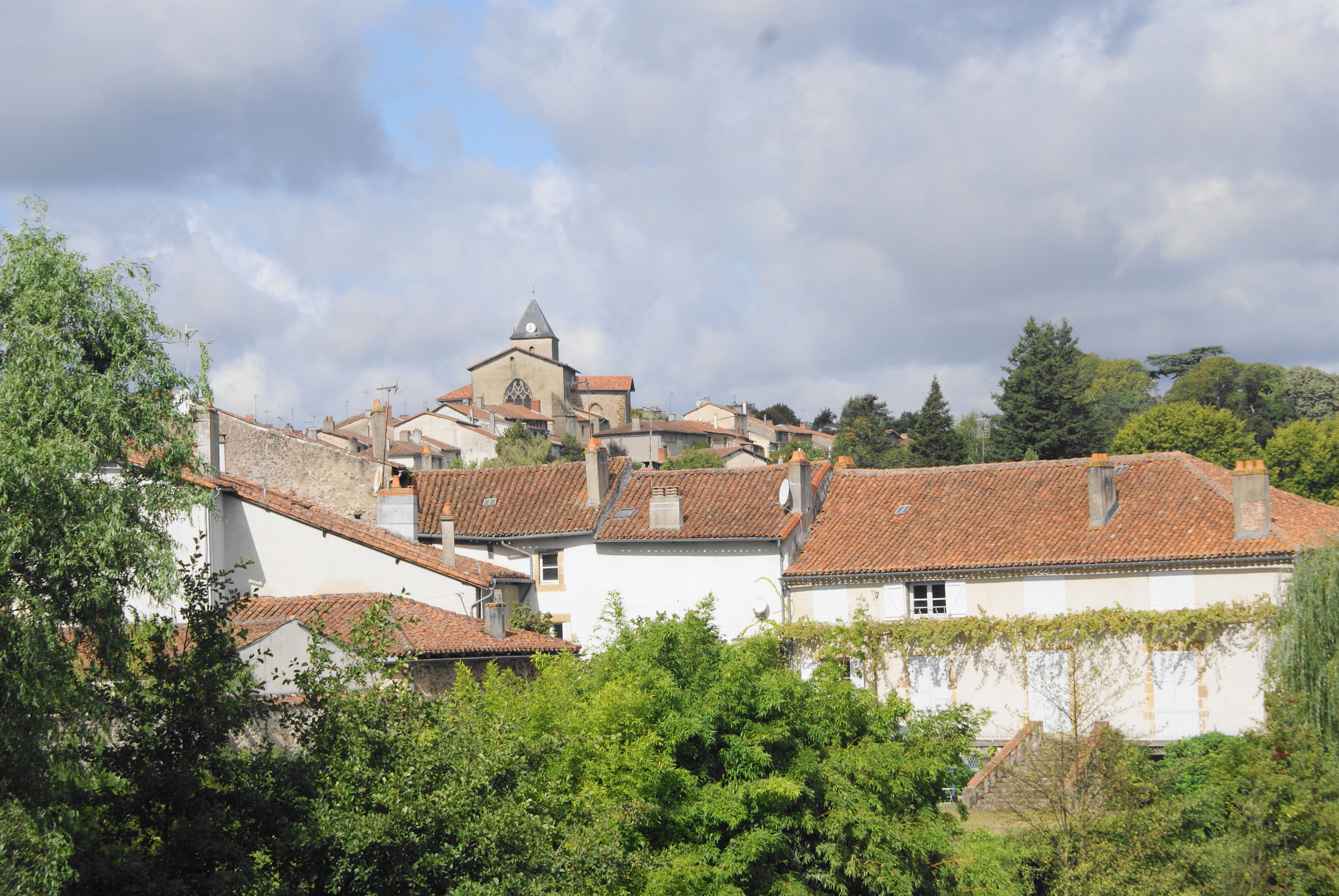
- The church and surrounding buildings in Availles-Limouzine

- Coat of arms
- Location of Availles-Limouzine
- Location within France Location within Nouvelle-Aquitaine
- Coordinates: 46°07′19″N 0°39′23″E
- Country: France
- Region: Nouvelle-Aquitaine
- Department: Vienne
- Arrondissement: Montmorillon
- Canton: Civray
- Intercommunality: CC Vienne Gartempe

Government
  - Mayor (2020–2026): Liliane Chabauty
- Area^{1}: 57.90 km^{2} (22.36 sq mi)
- Elevation: 60 m (200 ft)
- Highest elevation: 224 m (735 ft)
- Lowest elevation: 120 m (390 ft)
- Population (2023): 1,312
  - Density: 22.66/km^{2} (58.69/sq mi)
- Time zone: UTC+01:00 (CET)
  - Summer (DST): UTC+02:00 (CEST)
- INSEE/Postal code: 86015 /86460
- ^{1} French Land Register data, which excludes lakes, ponds, glaciers > 1 km^{2} (0.386 sq mi or 247 acres) and river estuaries.

Availles-Limouzine (French pronunciation: [avaj limuzin]; Occitan: Avalha Lemosina) is a commune in the west-central department of Vienne, in Nouvelle-Aquitaine.

The river Clouère flows north-westward through the western part of the commune, then forms its northwestern border. The river Vienne forms part of the commune's south-eastern border, then flows northward through the commune; the town lies on its left bank.
