= Oradour-Fanais =

- Commune
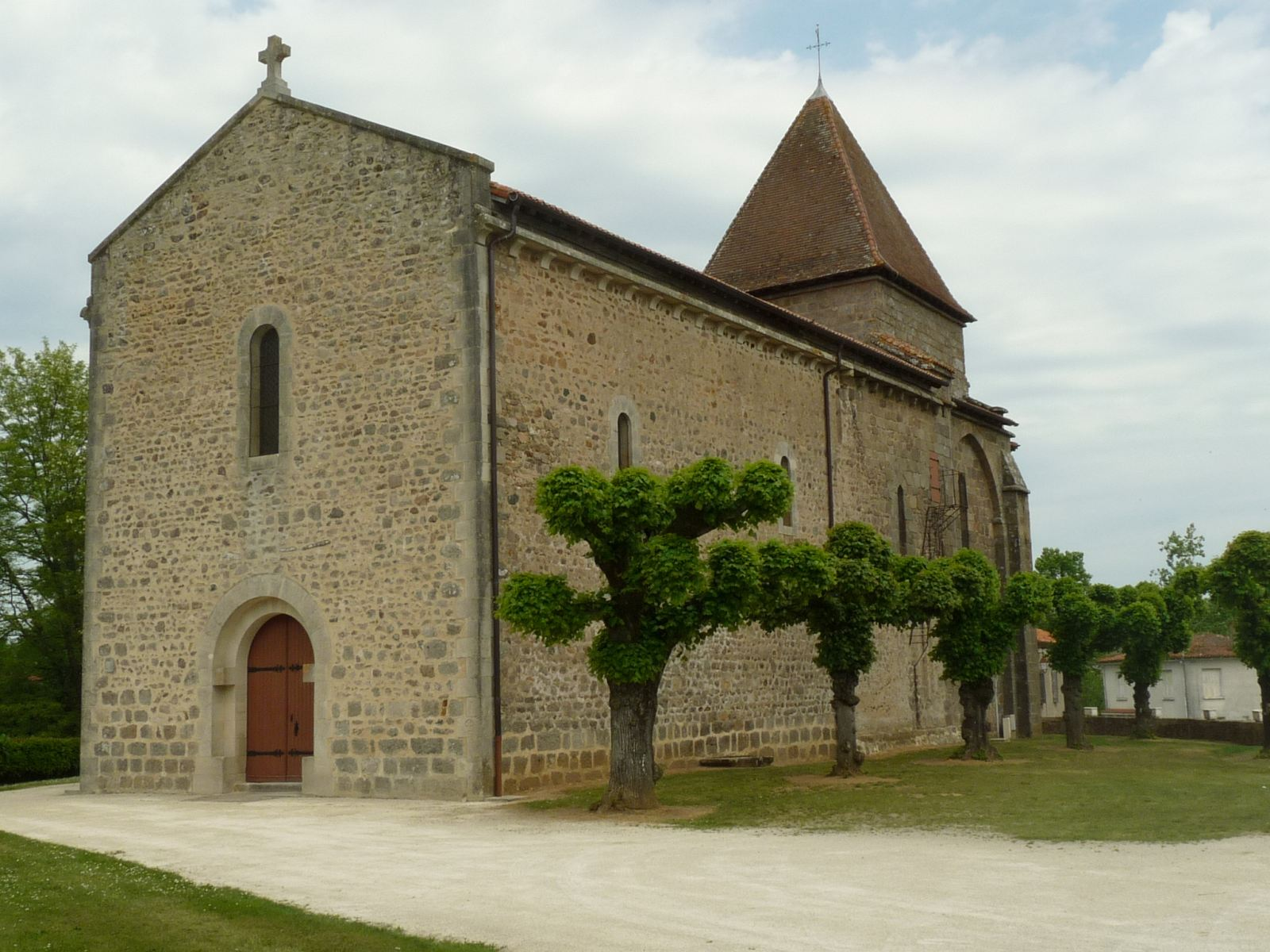
- The church in Oradour
- Location of Oradour-Fanais
- Location within France Location within Nouvelle-Aquitaine
- Coordinates: 46°07′18″N 0°47′04″E
- Country: France
- Region: Nouvelle-Aquitaine
- Department: Charente
- Arrondissement: Confolens
- Canton: Charente-Vienne
- Intercommunality: Charente Limousine

Government
  - Mayor (2020–2026): Patrick Soury
- Area^{1}: 26.41 km^{2} (10.20 sq mi)
- Elevation: 210 m (690 ft)
- Highest elevation: 239 m (784 ft)
- Lowest elevation: 178 m (584 ft)
- Population (2023): 342
  - Density: 12.9/km^{2} (33.5/sq mi)
- Time zone: UTC+01:00 (CET)
  - Summer (DST): UTC+02:00 (CEST)
- INSEE/Postal code: 16249 /16500
- ^{1} French Land Register data, which excludes lakes, ponds, glaciers > 1 km^{2} (0.386 sq mi or 247 acres) and river estuaries.

Oradour-Fanais (French pronunciation: [ɔʁaduʁ fanɛ]; Occitan: Orador Fanès) is a commune in the Charente department in southwestern France.

== Population ==
Historical population
Year	Pop.	±% p.a.
1968	475	—
1975	407	−2.18%
1982	375	−1.16%
1990	340	−1.22%
1999	342	+0.07%
2007	363	+0.75%
2012	385	+1.18%
2017	396	+0.57%
2023	342	−2.41%
Source: INSEE

== See also ==
- Communes of the Charente department
