= Clain =

River in western France

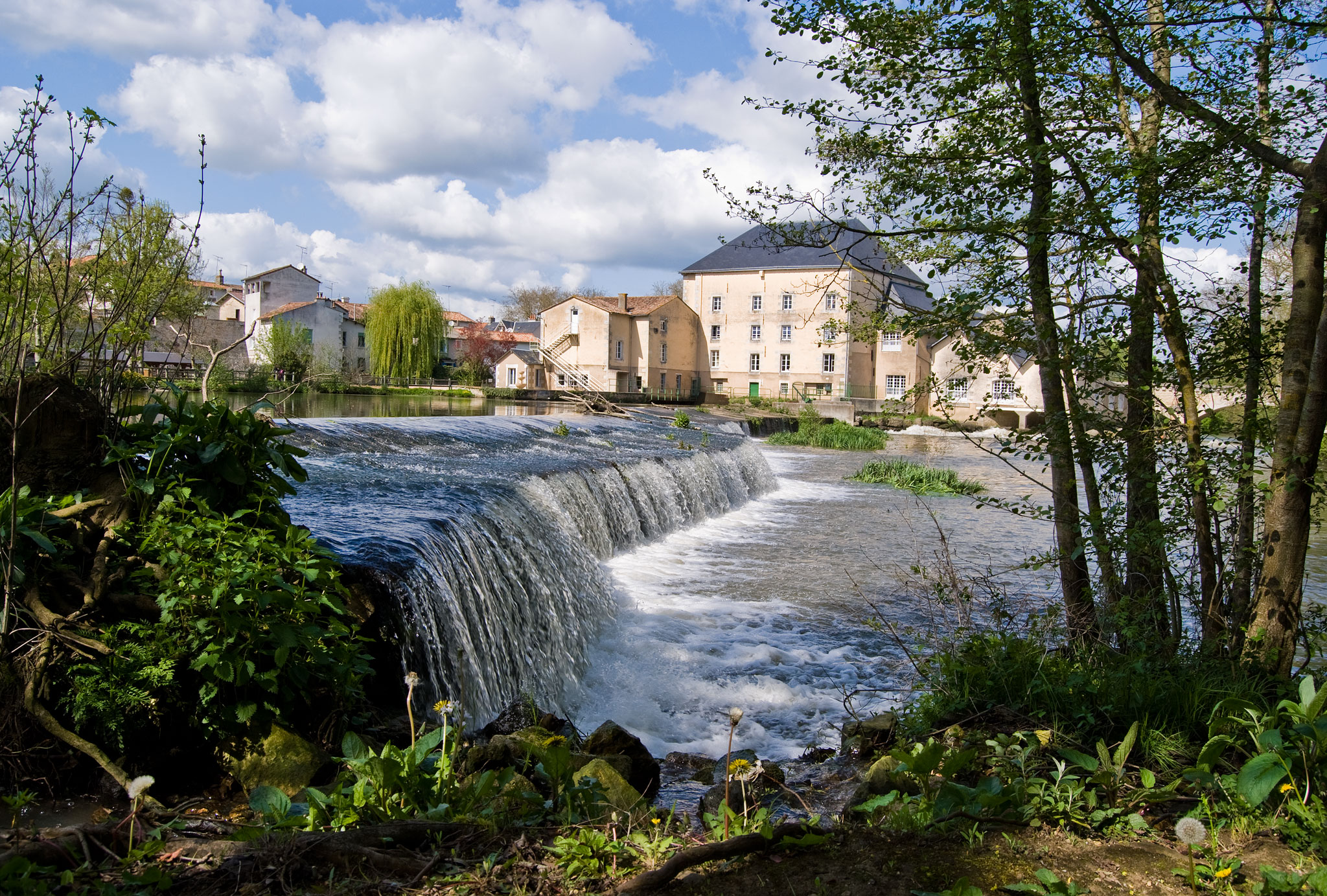

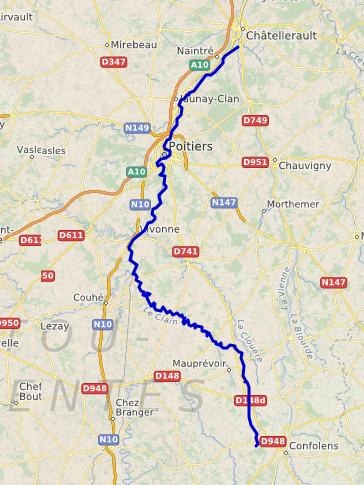

Location
- Country: France

Physical characteristics
- Source
  - location: Poitou
- Mouth
  - location: Vienne
  - coordinates: 46°46′52″N 0°32′26″E
- Length: 144 km (89 mi)
- Basin size: 3,145 km^{2} (1,214 sq mi)

Basin features
- Progression: Vienne→ Loire→ Atlantic Ocean

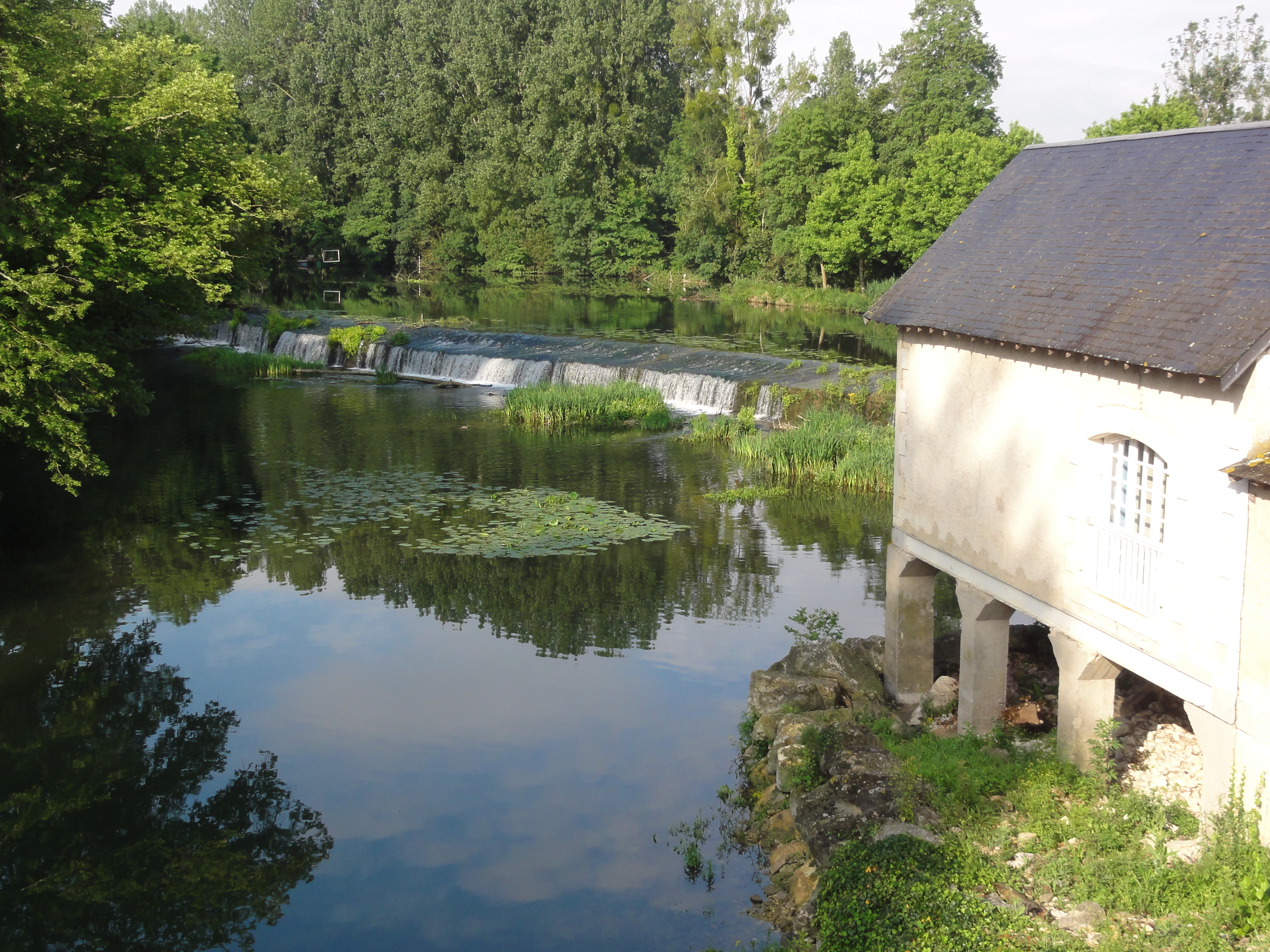
The Clain rivers in Chasseneuil-du-Poitou

The Clain (French pronunciation: [klɛ̃]; Occitan: Clen) is a 144 km (89 mi) long river in western France, a left tributary of the river Vienne. Its source is near Hiesse, Charente.

The Clain flows generally north, through the following departments and towns:

- Charente
- Vienne: Pressac, Vivonne, Poitiers.

It joins the Vienne near Châtellerault, Cenon-sur-Vienne.

Among its tributaries are the Boivre, the Clouère and the Vonne.
