= Lessac =

- Commune
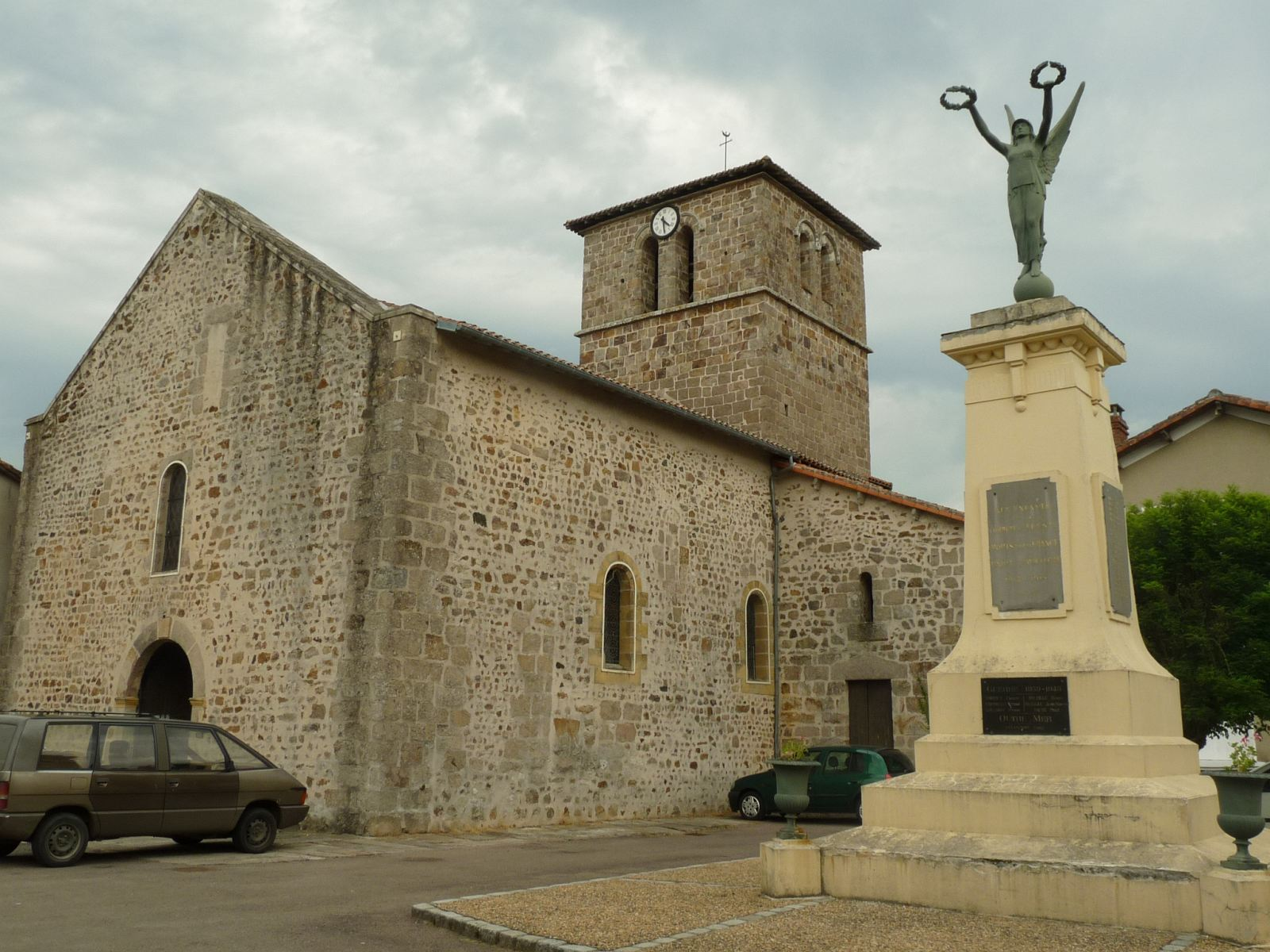
- The church in Lessac
- Location of Lessac
- Location within France Location within Nouvelle-Aquitaine
- Coordinates: 46°04′09″N 0°40′36″E
- Country: France
- Region: Nouvelle-Aquitaine
- Department: Charente
- Arrondissement: Confolens
- Canton: Charente-Vienne

Government
  - Mayor (2020–2026): Éric Pinaud
- Area^{1}: 34.14 km^{2} (13.18 sq mi)
- Elevation: 132 m (433 ft)
- Highest elevation: 232 m (761 ft)
- Lowest elevation: 122 m (400 ft)
- Population (2023): 549
  - Density: 16.1/km^{2} (41.6/sq mi)
- Time zone: UTC+01:00 (CET)
  - Summer (DST): UTC+02:00 (CEST)
- INSEE/Postal code: 16181 /16500
- ^{1} French Land Register data, which excludes lakes, ponds, glaciers > 1 km^{2} (0.386 sq mi or 247 acres) and river estuaries.

Lessac (French pronunciation: [lesak]) is a commune in the Charente department in southwestern France. About three kilometers north of the town center is the Domaine de Boisbuchet with the Château de Boisbuchet, built in 1865 on a hill above the Vienne. The castle and the approximately 150 hectare estate were bought in 1989 by the German art collector Alexander von Vegesack, curator and director of the Vitra Design Museum in Weil am Rhein, to use it during the summer months for workshops for artists, designers, architects and students.

The Vienne forms most of the commune's eastern border.

== Population ==
Historical population
Year	Pop.	±% p.a.
1968	648	—
1975	591	−1.31%
1982	587	−0.10%
1990	586	−0.02%
1999	531	−1.09%
2007	582	+1.15%
2012	566	−0.56%
2017	535	−1.12%
2023	549	+0.43%
Source: INSEE

== Domaine de Boisbuchet ==
In the Boisbuchet Architectural Park there are a number of experimental buildings, including:

- The Japanese guest house / La maison d’hôtes japonaise (built in Japan in 1860 and newly assembled in Boisbuchet)
- The paper pavilion / Le pavillon de papier (Shigeru Ban, Japan)
- The dome made of bamboo and fiberglass / Le dôme en bambou et en fiber de verre (Jörg Schlaich)
- The Manege / Le Manège (Markus Heinsdorff)
- The log cabin / La cabane (Brückner & Brückner Architects
- The Bamboo House and the Conference Pavilion (Simón Vélez, Colombia)
- The pyramid / La Pyramide (Brückner & Brückner)

== See also ==
- Communes of the Charente department
