= Roman Road of Agrippa (Saintes–Lyon) =

Road network

Road of Agrippa (Saintes–Lyon)
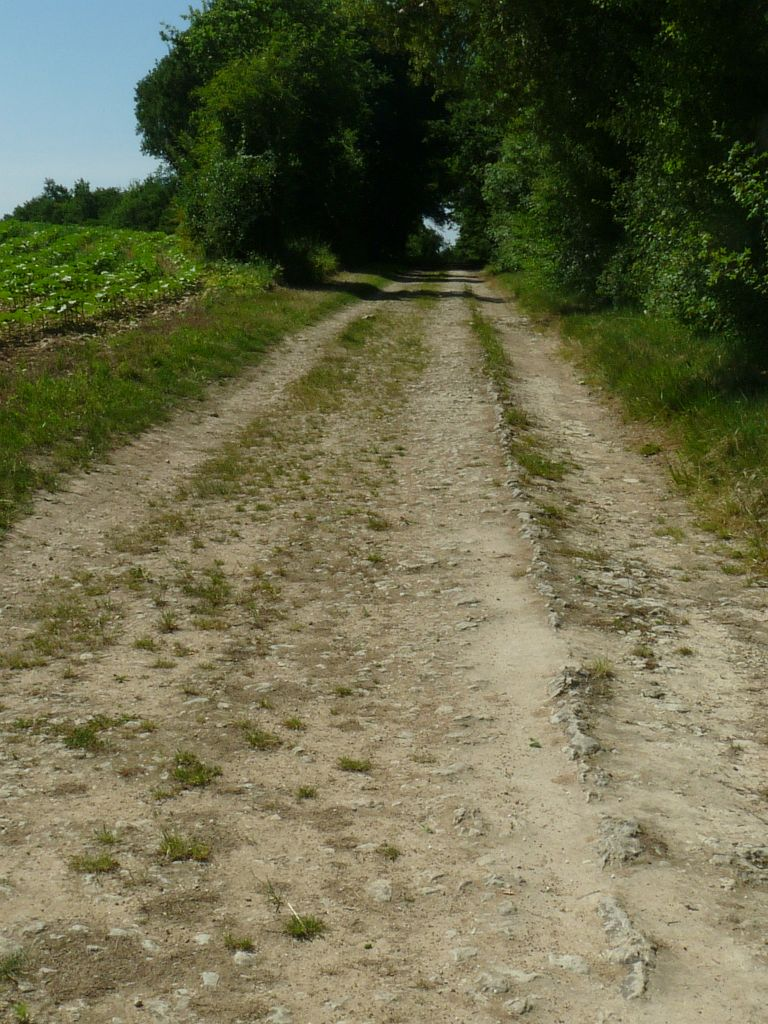
- Remains of a Roman road between Montignac-Charente and Saint-Cybardeaux (Charente).

The Roman road from Saintes to Lyon was part of one of the four main routes of the Agrippa road network, established from Lugdunum (modern-day Lyon), the capital of Roman Gaul. This network was developed beginning in 27 BCE under the direction of Marcus Vipsanius Agrippa, a general and son-in-law of Emperor Augustus.

This road, listed on the Tabula Peutingeriana, connected Lugdunum (modern-day Lyon) to Mediolanum Santonum (modern-day Saintes) via Augustonemetum (Clermont-Ferrand) and Augustoritum (Limoges).

In the 19th-century classification of Roman roads in France by Konrad Miller, the segment between Saintes and Limoges is designated as VR 27.

== History ==
The road was constructed in the 1st century CE under the direction of Marcus Vipsanius Agrippa to establish a connection between Lugdunum (Lyon) and Mediolanum Santonum (Saintes). Lugdunum thus became a major hub at the intersection of four major Roman roads: Lyon–Boulogne, Lyon–Cologne, the Via Narbonensis (following the Rhône Valley), and Lyon–Saintes.

From the 5th century onward, Roman roads generally fell into disrepair due to the decline of central administration. However, portions of this route remain visible today, with some sections incorporated into modern departmental roads, while others persist as rural paths running through agricultural and wooded areas.

Locally, the route is sometimes referred to as the "Roman path" or "paved path." (Note: The locality of Le Chausset, situated at the southern boundary of the road in the commune of Saint-Sulpice-de-Cognac, is toponymically related to the route.)

== Itinerary ==
- The route, partly following existing or lost roads and paths, extended from Lyon and Limoges through various localities including Aixe-sur-Vienne, Les Bouchats, Saint-Auvent, the forest of Rochechouart, departmental road D208, La Petite Lande (north of Rochechouart), Chassenon, the ford at La Soutière, the ridge northeast of Saint-Quentin-sur-Charente, and Suris, La Pouillerie, Mazières, Margnac, and Les Granges.
- Continuing via departmental roads 45, 119, 188, 55, and 159, as well as rural paths connecting segments now covered by modern infrastructure, the route passed through Coulgens, then approximately 10 km to Basse, followed by 4 km to the Gallo-Roman theatre of Les Bouchauds. It proceeded through Saint-Cybardeaux, Rouillac, Les Villairs (4 km), the area between Rulle and Herpes (6 km), Sainte-Sévère (3 km), north of Cherves at Le Ferry (6 km), then through Chez Trocada (1 km), Le Chausset (2 km), Chez Jouannais (2 km), Pidou (2 km), Saint-Sauvant (6 km), and finally reached Saintes.

== Description of stages ==
This road axis extends predominantly in an east–west direction, often in a straight line, connecting Lyon, Feurs Forum Segusiavorum|, and Limoges. It is considered plausible that the route partially or entirely followed a preexisting Gallic path, which was subsequently modernized during the reign of Emperor Augustus.

From Limoges, the Agrippa road crossed the Vienne River at Aixe-sur-Vienne. The precise route of this segment remains uncertain. It likely ran slightly south of Cognac-la-Forêt and in proximity to Rochechouart. While remnants are visible in Saint-Auvent, they are believed to belong to a later secondary Gallo-Roman road, part of the viae vicinales network, which served as a system of local routes connected to the main Roman roadways.

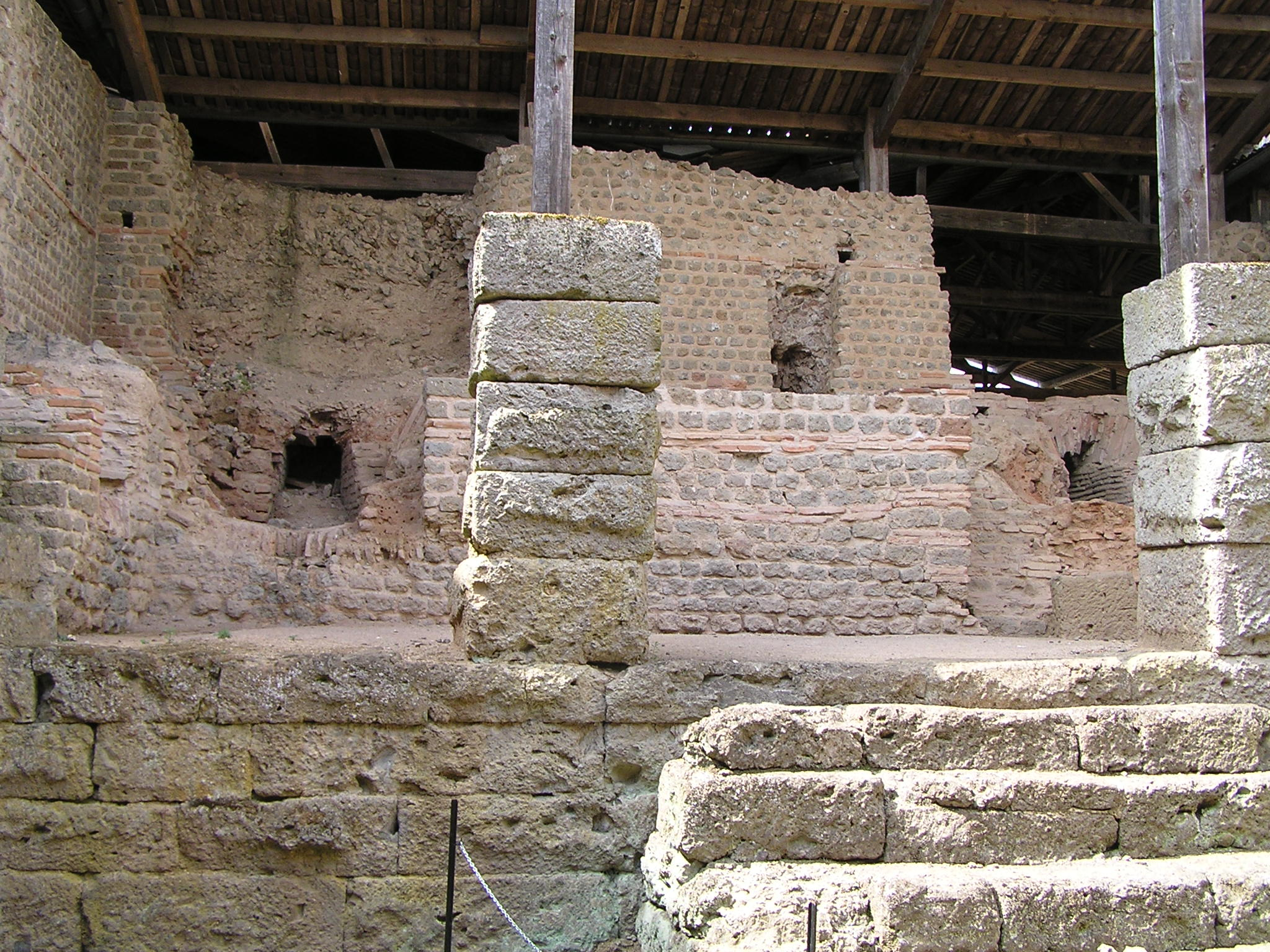
Chassenon thermal baths.

The via Agrippa enters the current department of Charente at the commune of Chassenon, corresponding to the ancient site of Cassinomagus. Between the 1st and 4th centuries, this location developed into a Gallo-Roman complex. The road approached the settlement from the south.

Located on a plateau bordered by the Vienne River, Cassinomagus—identified on the Tabula Peutingeriana—was a secondary urban center within the territory of the Lemovices. The site is notable for its thermal baths and its geological setting within the Rochechouart–Chassenon astrobleme, a 20 km-wide asteroid impact structure that provided a distinctive green breccia used in local construction.

The via Agrippa crosses the Graine River at the site of the former mill of La Soutière and continues northeast of Saint-Quentin-sur-Charente, through an area historically known in the 19th century as lous chiamps roumis. Situated on a ridge marking the watershed between the Loire and Charente river basins, the route intersects with another ancient north–south road, known as the chemin ferré, which connected Périgueux and Poitiers via Nontron, Videix, La Péruse, and Charroux. The cadastral parcel at this junction, located in the commune of Suris, is still referred to as Les Chaussades.

Near Saint-Quentin-sur-Charente, a branch diverges from the main route, forming a secondary connection between Limoges and Angoulême. This secondary road, also known as the Chemin des Anglais (Charente), continues southwest through Mouzon, L'Arbre, Saint-Sornin, Vilhonneur, Pranzac, and Le Quéroy, before entering Angoulême at La Bussatte.

Near Mazières, the earlier route indicated on the Tabula Peutingeriana diverged toward Aulnay-de-Saintonge, the ancient settlement of Aunedonnacum. As the via Agrippa descends from the clay hills of the Limousin Charente region and enters the limestone zone near Les Frauds, between Taponnat and Chasseneuil-sur-Bonnieure, the road becomes more visible. In this section, characterized by long, straight alignments, the route corresponds to a new segment laid out by the Romans in the direction of Saintes.

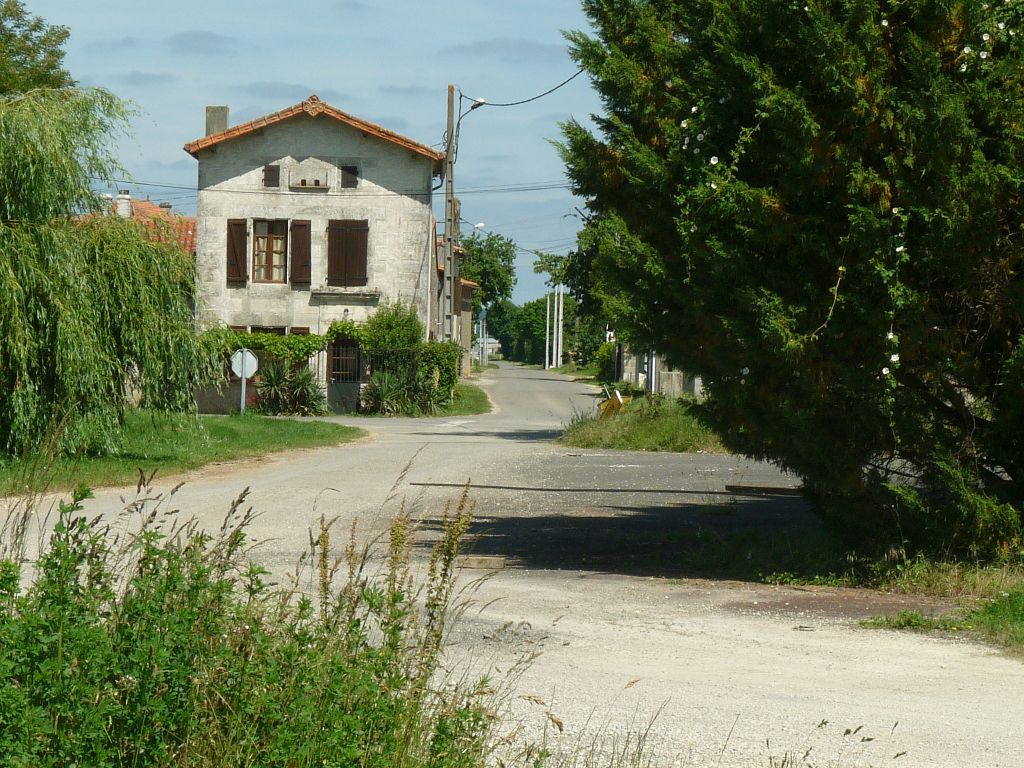
Crossroads at the Needle.

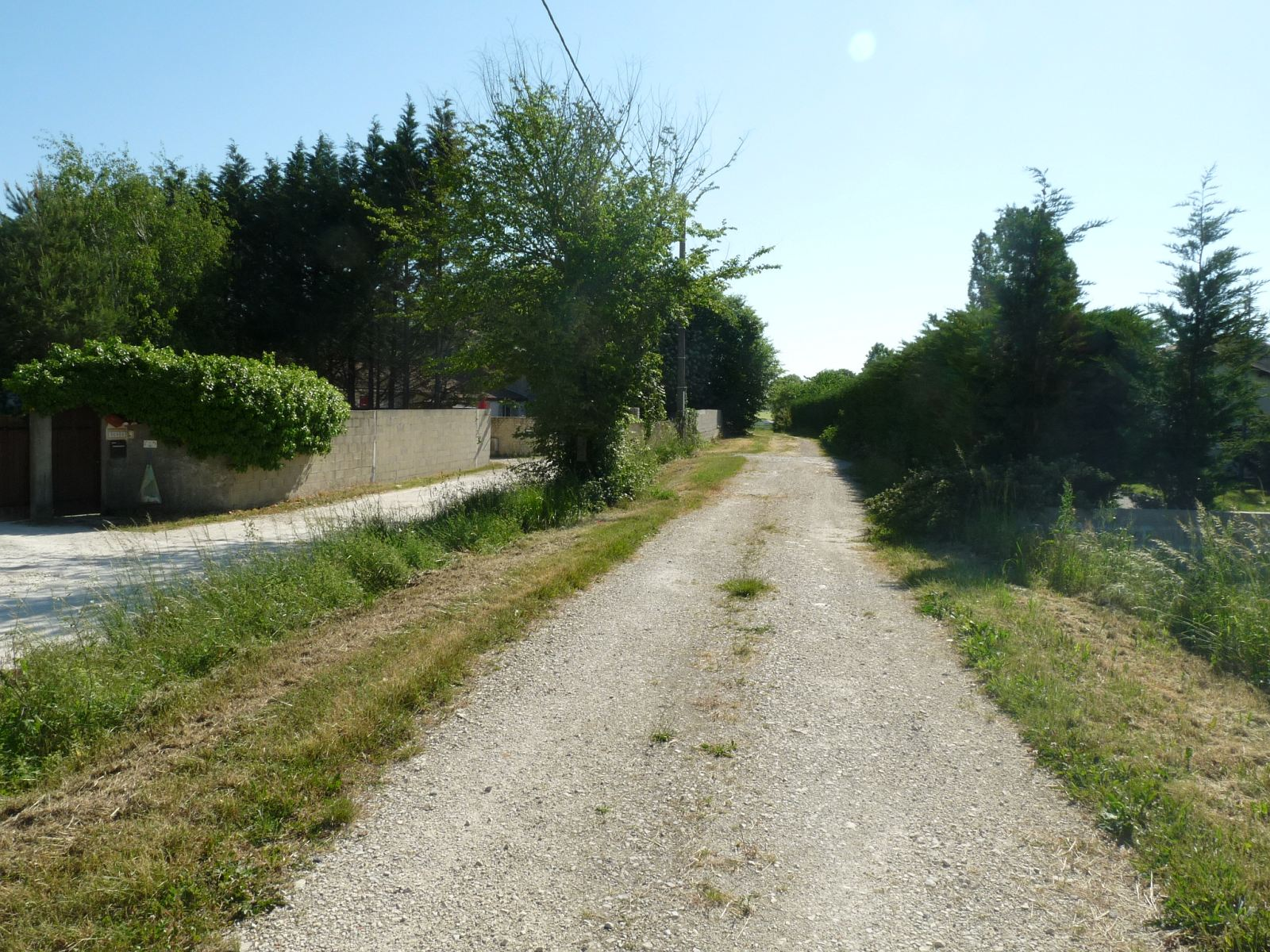
The entrance is on the road to Villejoubert.

West of Coulgens, at the site known as L'Aiguille, the road intersects a secondary route connecting Angoulême and Bourges, which passed through Brigueuil, Bellac, Argenton, and Issoudun.

The road continues north of Tourriers, passes through Villejoubert, and crosses the Charente River at Montignac. Near Saint-Amant-de-Boixe, it intersects with another Roman road running from Périgueux to Poitiers—originating from Bouëx and La Simarde and heading toward Mansle, Ruffec, and Rom—locally referred to as La Chaussée, chemin de Sers, or la Chaussada.

The next station, Germanicomagus (noted as "Sermanicomagus" on some cartographic sources), was an important stop mentioned on the Tabula Peutingeriana. The site includes the Gallo-Roman theatre of Les Bouchauds, as well as a sanctuary with at least two temples, remains of an aqueduct, and a group of dwellings that have yet to be excavated. At this location, the Roman road intersected with a route originating from Iculisma (modern Angoulême, to the southeast), which likely extended toward Aunedonnacum, now Aulnay-de-Saintonge, approximately 40 km to the northwest.

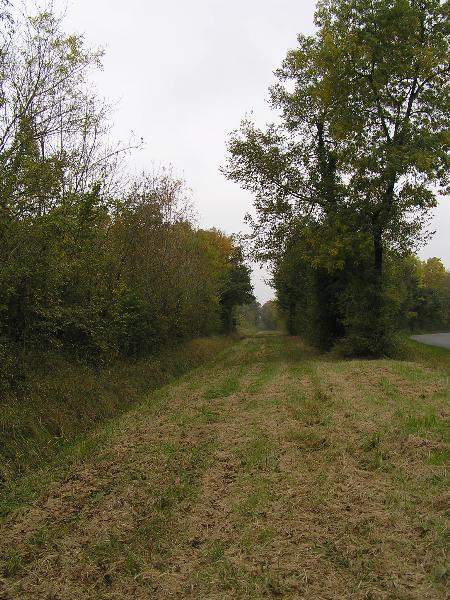
Road between Sainte-Sévère and Cherves-Richemont, and the D 55 which branches off to the right.

The road continues through Saint-Cybardeaux and Plaizac, where the toponym Bois de la Grande Borne reflects the area's historical significance. (Note: This area lies approximately 39.6 km from Saintes, corresponding possibly to milestone 16 or 17 if distances were measured in leagues from Saintes.)

At Herpes, it intersects with a paved north-south route in a region known for Frankish settlements, including nearby Rulle and Macqueville, where approximately 1,800 Frankish tombs were discovered in 1886 along this road.

Following a generally straight course toward Saint-Sauvant in Charente-Maritime, the road is intermittently overlaid by departmental roads or remains as a rural path, locally known as the chemin des Romains. It passes through Sainte-Sévère, near the remains of a fortified camp—once believed to be Roman—located about 150 meters south of the road and north of the village of Cherves. The road also crosses the Antenne River at the Saint-Sulpice bridge.

The road continues along the right bank in Charente-Maritime through Saint-Sauvant and leads to Saintes, the ancient Mediolanum Santonum. It passes opposite the Arch of Germanicus, which marked the entrance to the bridge over the Charente River, with the Gallo-Roman city located on the opposite bank.

Numerous Roman villae were established along the road; (Note: Roman villae were located on both sides of the road, between 300 meters and 1 kilometer. These settlements later developed into villages during the Middle Ages, with the Roman road frequently serving as a boundary between communes.) for example, Rouillac is believed to derive its name from a landowner named Rullus who built a villa near the road, while Chérac and Sonneville are similarly linked to Gallo-Roman owners, including one named Carius.

Toponyms incorporating Germanic names indicate Frankish settlements dating to the 6th century, such as Macqueville (from Macco), Anville (from Emmo), and Bréville (from Bradher). The presence of Christianized Franks in the area is evidenced by a 6th-century baptistery located in the church of Herpes, near Courbillac.

== Milestones ==
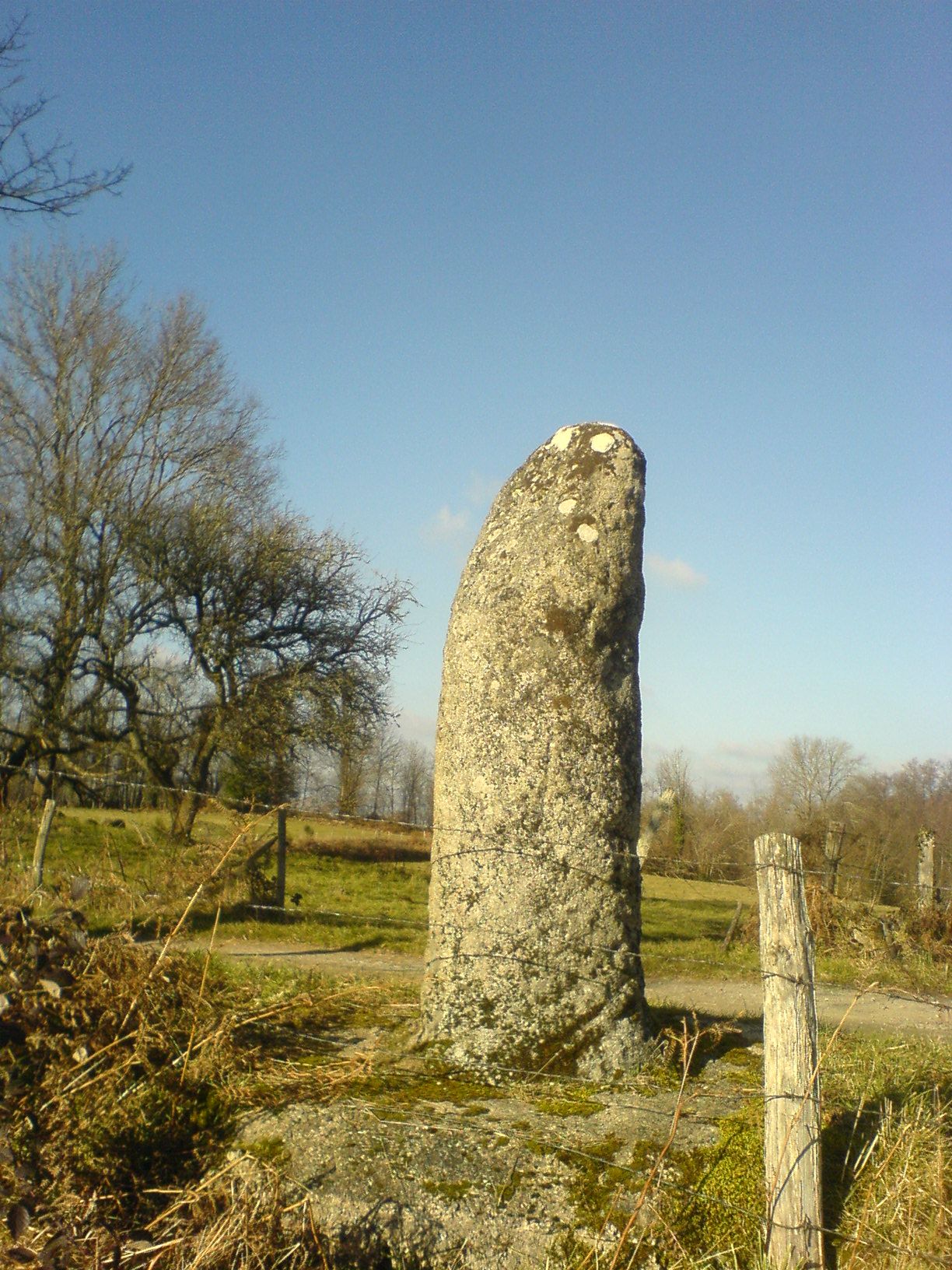
Pierre du Marteau on the Via Agrippa (Donzeil, Creuse).

Milestones have reportedly been found near the boundary between the communes of Cherves-Richemont and Saint-Sulpice-de-Cognac in Charente, as well as in Saint-Sulpice near the border with Charente-Maritime at a site known as "Chez Rateau." In the 19th century, Abbé Michon documented a milestone located at the bottom of a ditch east of the Solençon pond, on the border between Cherves-Richemont and Sainte-Sévère. This milestone was described as a cylindrical shaft with a square base.

The milestones were numbered using Gallic leagues, as was common throughout Aquitaine, with each league measuring approximately 2.44 km or 2.22 km if Romanized. This system differs from other provinces of the Roman Empire, where distances were typically measured in Roman miles of about 1.48 km.

== Peutinger map ==
The Peutinger Table indicates that the Limoges–Saintes route passed through Aunedonnacum, present-day Aulnay-de-Saintonge. This route corresponds to an earlier Roman road predating the direct connection established by Agrippa between Lugdunum and Mediolanum Santonum via Germanicomagus. This older Gallic road branched off from the Agrippa route east of Chasseneuil and likely passed through Chasseneuil-sur-Bonnieure, Mansle, and Charmé.

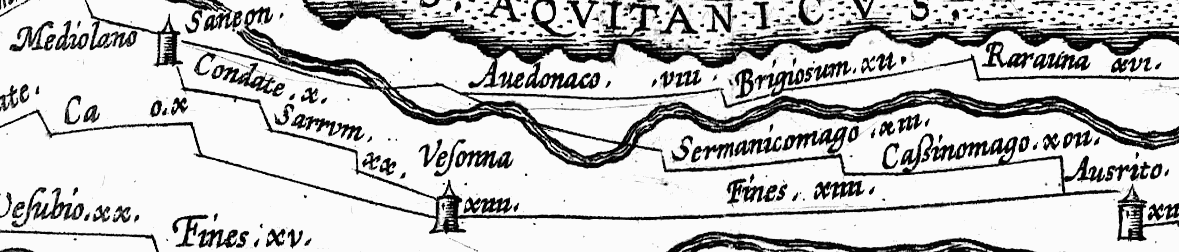

On the map, one can read:

Mediolano Santon.____Avedonaco____Sermanicomago__XIII__Cassinomago__XVII__Ausrito

That is: unknown distance between Mediolanum Santonum (Saintes) and Avedonacum (Aulnay), unknown distance between Avedonacum and Sermanicomagus, 13 leagues from Sermanicomagus to Cassinomagus (Chassenon), 17 leagues from Cassinomagus to Augustoritum (Limoges), which allows a rough localization of these stages despite errors, as according to Jacques Dassié it should read:

Mediolano Santon.__XVI__Avedonaco__XVII__Sermanicomago__XXII__Cassinomago__XVII__Ausrito, with 1 league = 2.44 km.

The station of Sermanicomagus (or Germanicomagus, if this was a copyist's error) is thought to be located on the section between Chassenon and Aulnay. (Note: The route's passage through Avedonacum, as shown on the elongated Peutinger map, may represent a graphical simplification, since it creates a significant detour between Limoges and Saintes.) Jacques Dassié identifies it at La Terne, while Abbé Michon places it at Charmé. Consequently, the theater of Les Bouchauds (in Saint-Cybardeaux) is unlikely to be Sermanicomagus. This Gallo-Roman settlement, probably more recent and contemporary with Iculisma (modern Angoulême), likely developed as a crossroads at the intersection of a road from Iculisma and the Agrippa road, but it has not been definitively identified.

Distances indicated in the Peutinger Table, as well as on milestones in the region, are expressed in Gallo-Roman leagues, as throughout Aquitaine, rather than in Roman miles.

=== Ancient variant via Aulnay ===
In 1840, Abbé Michon identified a road branching from the Agrippa route at Mazières, of which few traces remain. Locally known as the "Roman road" in the communes of Lussac and Chasseneuil, remnants such as paving and villae have been found, particularly at La Terne (Luxé) and Charmé, where the settlement of Sermanicomagus may have been located.

According to the Peutinger Map, this road would connect at Aunedonnacum (modern Aulnay) with a route from Limonum (Poitiers) and continue toward Mediolanum Santonum (Saintes).

However, A.-F. Lièvre considered this variant to be entirely hypothetical, at least between La Terne and Aulnay.

== See also ==
- Roman roads
- Tabula Peutingeriana
- Roman Road from Saintes to Périgueux
- Saintes, Charente-Maritime
- Via Agrippa

== Bibliography ==
- Michon, Jean-Hippolyte (1844). Statistique monumentale de la Charente [Monumental statistics for the Charente department] (in French). Paris: Derache.
