= Genouillac =

Genouillac may refer to the following places in France:

- Genouillac, Charente, a commune of the Charente département
- Genouillac, Creuse, a commune of the Creuse département
