= Via Agrippa =

Network of Roman roads in Gaul

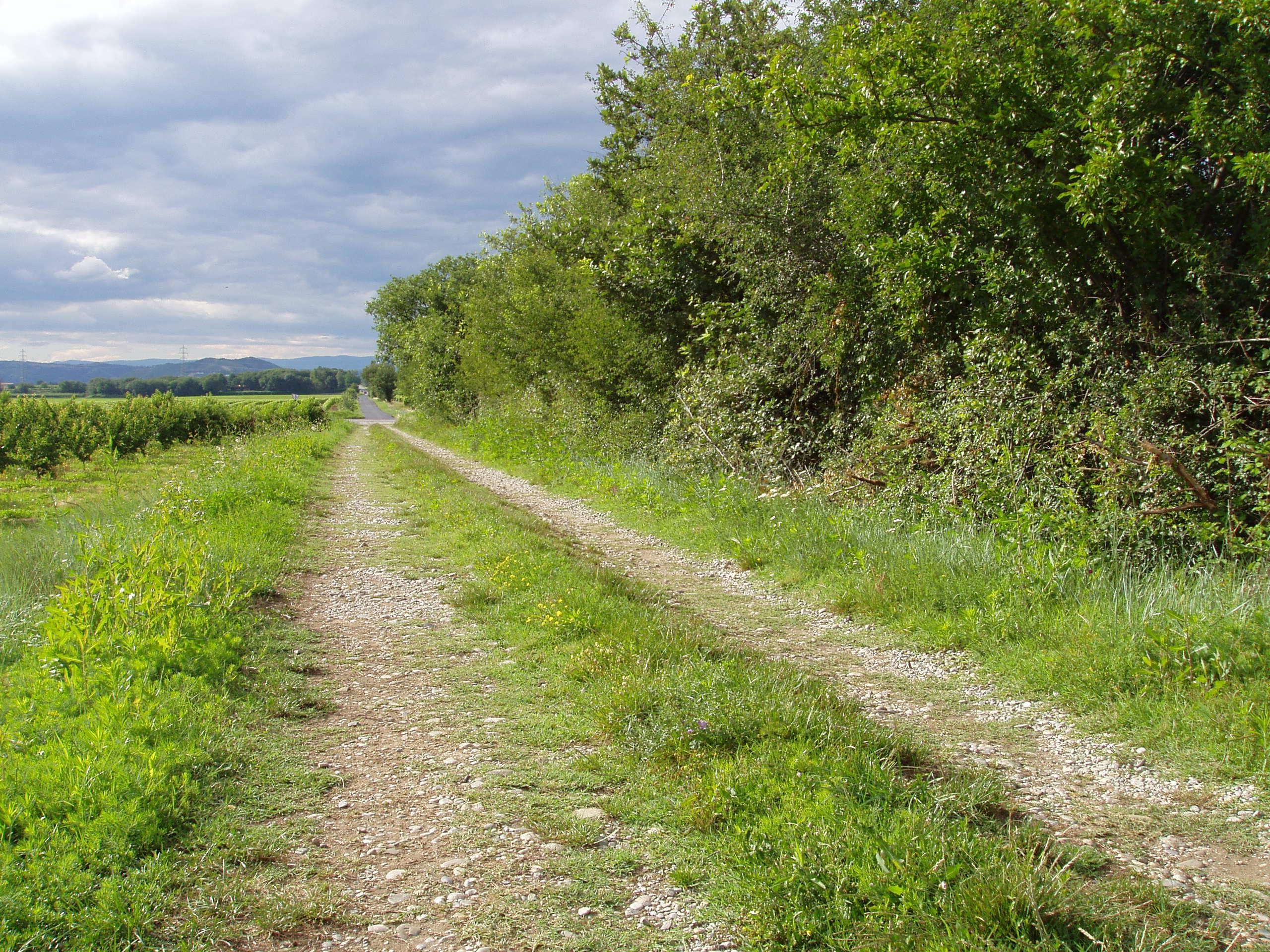
A section of Via Agrippa near Beaumont-Monteux (Drôme)

Roman roads in Gaul.

Via Agrippa, is any stretch of the network of Roman roads in Gaul that was built in the last century BCE by Marcus Vipsanius Agrippa, to whom Octavian entrusted the reorganization of the Gauls. In all, the Romans built 21,000 kilometres (13,000 mi) of roads in Gaul.

== Agrippa's project ==
Agrippa's network radiated from a hub at the new strategic site of Lugdunum (Lyon). Strabo indicated the directions, which were identified by Pierre Gros:

- a route towards the Atlantic, from Lugdunum/Lyon towards Saintes
- a route towards the North Sea, via Reims, Beauvais and Amiens
- a route towards the Rhine, via Langres, Trier and Cologne
- and a route towards the south, to Marseille.

Though the detailed routes taken by the various stretches of the Via Agrippa are well settled on the ground, the dates of construction are still debated: in 39-38 BCE, according to the authors of the Guide romain antique; 22-21 BCE, according to Pierre Gros; or between 16 and 13 BCE, according to Paul Petit.

== The southern route ==
An ancient salt road passed to the mouths of the Rhône, keeping to the lower slopes of the hills to avoid the river's sometimes swampy flood plain. Under the impetus of Augustus, Agrippa paved a route that lay closer to the river, passing through the important Roman cities of Arles, Avignon, Orange, Montélimar, Valence, Vienne, interspersed with relay stations (mutationes) where a change of horses was maintained for official couriers. This route was augmented by the Via Antonina along the right bank of the Rhône.

== Traces of the via Agrippa ==
Near Valence, the modern Route nationale 7 follows the track of the via Agrippa.

To the north of the Isère the via Agrippa, having passed the crossroads still called Sept Chemins ("Seven Roads") followed the line now marked by Route départementale 101 towards Beaumont-Monteux; there a Route communale and a pathway trace the straight Roman track which serves as boundary between the communes of Beaumont-Monteux and Pont-de-l'Isère. Nearby, the toponym Vie Magne records the passage of the via magna, the "great road".

== Roman milestones ==
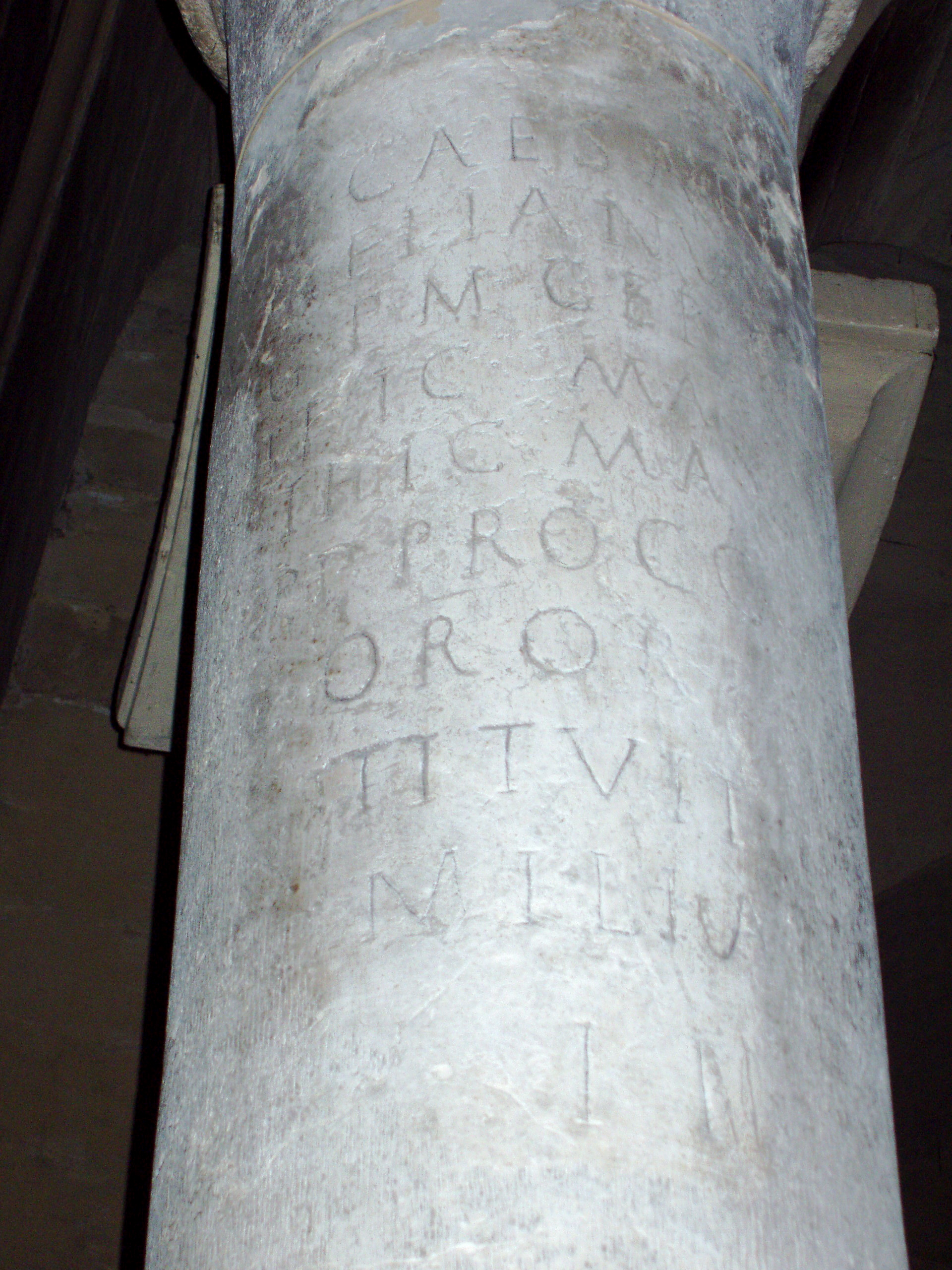
Milestone of the via Agrippa reused in the Cathedral of Valence, Drôme)

Inscribed standing milestones placed along the route indicated the miles from the starting point (capita viae) with Vienne, Valence or Avignon, as well as the magistrate or emperor who had them erected or maintained.

In addition to twenty-two surviving milestones recovered along the route is one of the 3rd or 4th century reused in the ambulatory of the choir of the Cathedral of Valence, where its inscription may still be read:

IMP(ERATOR) CAESAR L(UCIUS) DOMIT[IUS]
AURELIANU[S] P(IUS) [F(ELIX)] INV[I]CT[US]
[AU]G(USTUS) P(ONTIFEX) MA(XIMUS) GER[MANIC(US) MAX(IMUS)]
[GO]THIC(US) MA[X(IMUS) CARPIC(US) MAX(IMUS)] ?
[PAR]THIC(US) MA[X(IMUS) TRIB(UNICIA) POT(ESTATE) VI CO(N)S(UL)] ?
[III] P(ATER) P(ATRIAE) PROCO(N)[S(UL) PACATOR ET RES]
[TITUT]OR ORB(IS) [REFECIT ET]
[R]ESTITUIT […]
MILIA [PASSUUM]
I[I] II ?

Translation
"The Emperor Caesar Lucius Domitian Aurelianus, pious, fortunate, invincible, august, high priest, greatest conqueror of the Germans, Goths, Carpi, Parthians, reinvested with the power of a Tribune for the [?th] time, consul [?] times, father of his country, proconsul, restorer of universal peace, restored it: 3 [or 4] miles"

== See also ==
- Roman Road of Agrippa (Saintes–Lyon)
