= Terres-de-Haute-Charente =

Commune in Nouvelle-Aquitaine, France

- Commune
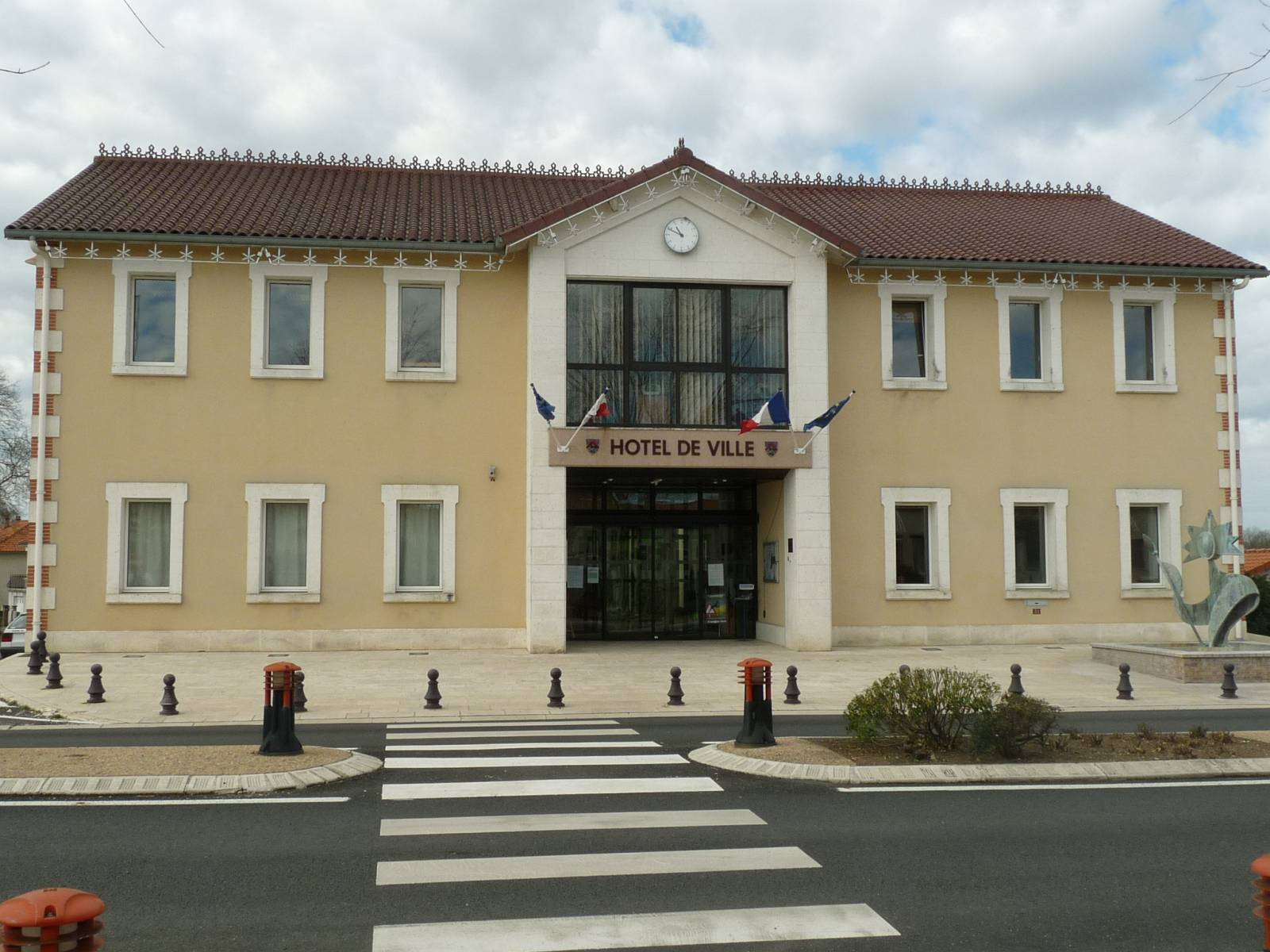
- The town hall in Roumazières-Loubert
- Location of Terres-de-Haute-Charente
- Location within France Location within Nouvelle-Aquitaine
- Coordinates: 45°53′45″N 0°34′34″E
- Country: France
- Region: Nouvelle-Aquitaine
- Department: Charente
- Arrondissement: Confolens
- Canton: Charente-Bonnieure and Charente-Vienne
- Intercommunality: Charente Limousine
- Area^{1}: 86.66 km^{2} (33.46 sq mi)
- Highest elevation: 267 m (876 ft)
- Lowest elevation: 145 m (476 ft)
- Population (2023): 3,777
  - Density: 43.58/km^{2} (112.9/sq mi)
- Time zone: UTC+01:00 (CET)
  - Summer (DST): UTC+02:00 (CEST)
- INSEE/Postal code: 16192 /16270
- ^{1} French Land Register data, which excludes lakes, ponds, glaciers > 1 km^{2} (0.386 sq mi or 247 acres) and river estuaries.

Terres-de-Haute-Charente is a commune in the department of Charente, southwestern France. It was established on 1 January 2019 by merger of the former communes of Roumazières-Loubert (the seat), Genouillac, Mazières, La Péruse and Suris.

== Population ==
Population data refer to the commune in its geography as of January 2025.

Historical population
Year	Pop.	±% p.a.
1968	4,915	—
1975	4,940	+0.07%
1982	4,721	−0.65%
1990	4,450	−0.74%
1999	4,235	−0.55%
2007	4,018	−0.66%
2012	4,013	−0.02%
2017	3,953	−0.30%
2023	3,777	−0.76%
Source: INSEE

== See also ==
- Communes of the Charente department
