= Mazières =

- Part of Terres-de-Haute-Charente
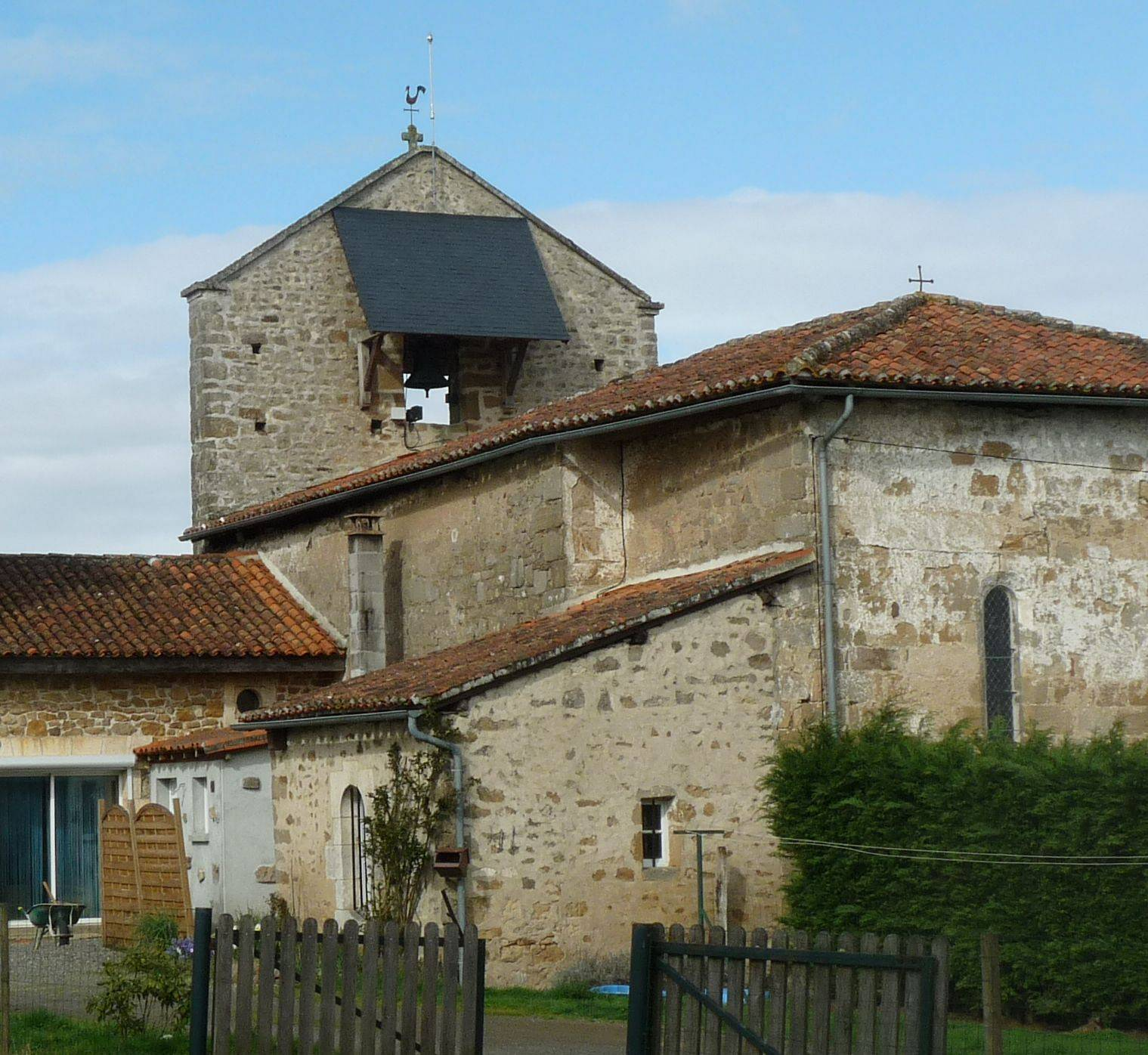
- Location of Mazières
- Location within France Location within Nouvelle-Aquitaine
- Coordinates: 45°50′13″N 0°34′17″E
- Country: France
- Region: Nouvelle-Aquitaine
- Department: Charente
- Arrondissement: Confolens
- Canton: Charente-Bonnieure
- Commune: Terres-de-Haute-Charente
- Area^{1}: 5.87 km^{2} (2.27 sq mi)
- Elevation: 200 m (660 ft)
- Highest elevation: 236 m (774 ft)
- Lowest elevation: 145 m (476 ft)
- Population (2023): 90
  - Density: 15/km^{2} (40/sq mi)
- Time zone: UTC+01:00 (CET)
  - Summer (DST): UTC+02:00 (CEST)
- Postal code: 16270
- ^{1} French Land Register data, which excludes lakes, ponds, glaciers > 1 km^{2} (0.386 sq mi or 247 acres) and river estuaries.

Mazières (French pronunciation: [mazjɛʁ]) is a former commune in the Charente department in southwestern France. On 1 January 2019, it was merged into the new commune Terres-de-Haute-Charente.

== See also ==
- Communes of the Charente department
