= Coulgens =

- Commune
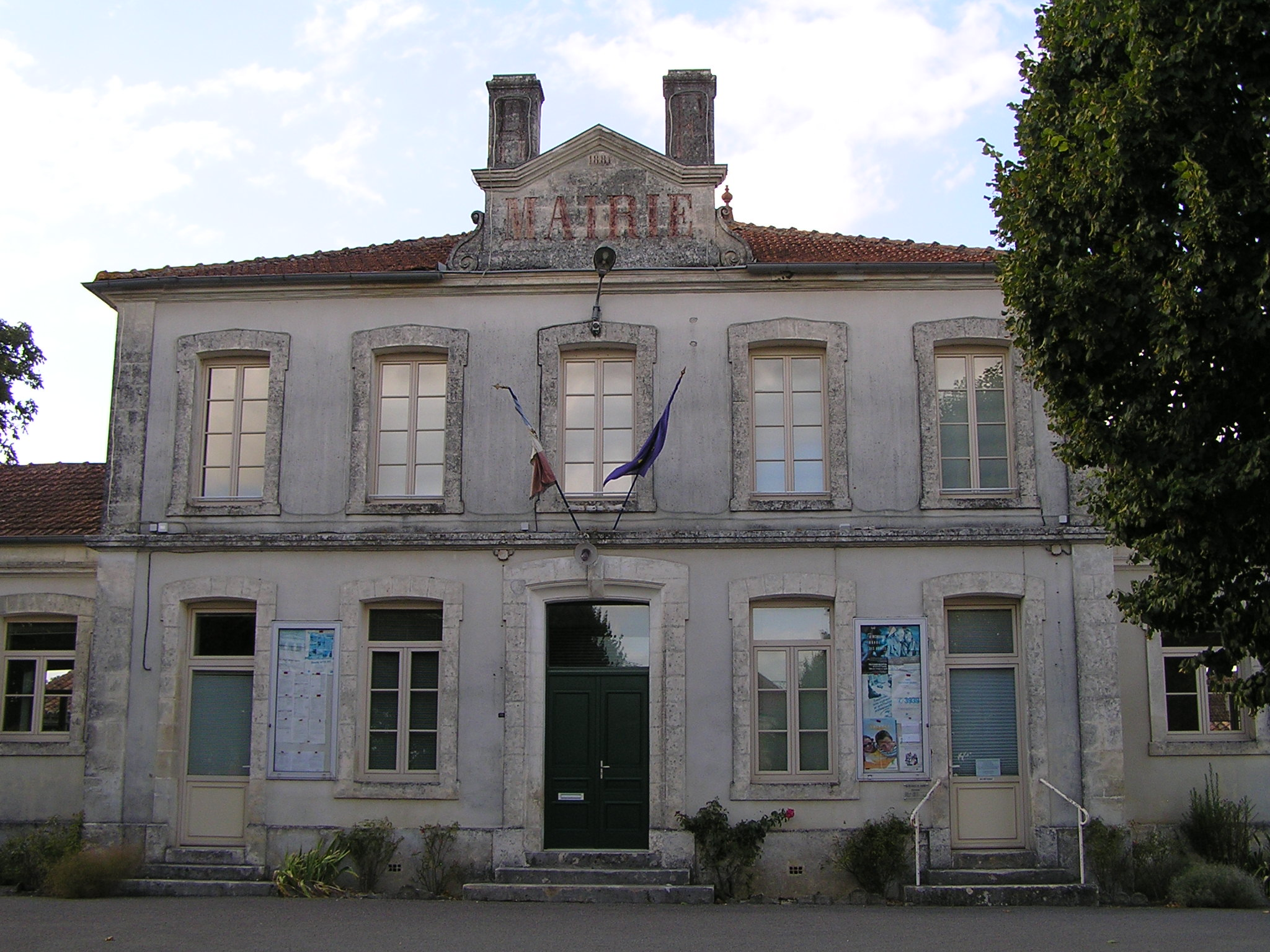
- Town hall
- Location of Coulgens
- Location within France Location within Nouvelle-Aquitaine
- Coordinates: 45°48′44″N 0°17′16″E
- Country: France
- Region: Nouvelle-Aquitaine
- Department: Charente
- Arrondissement: Angoulême
- Canton: Val de Tardoire
- Intercommunality: La Rochefoucauld - Porte du Périgord

Government
  - Mayor (2020–2026): Véronique Pichon
- Area^{1}: 11.70 km^{2} (4.52 sq mi)
- Elevation: 82 m (269 ft)
- Highest elevation: 127 m (417 ft)
- Lowest elevation: 65 m (213 ft)
- Population (2023): 558
  - Density: 47.7/km^{2} (124/sq mi)
- Time zone: UTC+01:00 (CET)
  - Summer (DST): UTC+02:00 (CEST)
- INSEE/Postal code: 16107 /16560
- ^{1} French Land Register data, which excludes lakes, ponds, glaciers > 1 km^{2} (0.386 sq mi or 247 acres) and river estuaries.

Coulgens (French pronunciation: [kulʒɑ̃]; Occitan: Colgent) is a commune in the Charente department in southwestern France.

== Population ==
Historical population
| Year | Pop. | ±% p.a. |
|---|---|---|
| 1968 | 399 | — |
| 1975 | 379 | −0.73% |
| 1982 | 418 | +1.41% |
| 1990 | 389 | −0.89% |
| 1999 | 382 | −0.20% |
| 2007 | 494 | +3.27% |
| 2012 | 502 | +0.32% |
| 2017 | 537 | +1.36% |
| 2023 | 558 | +0.64% |
Source: INSEE

== See also ==
- Communes of the Charente department
