= La Péruse =

- Part of Terres-de-Haute-Charente
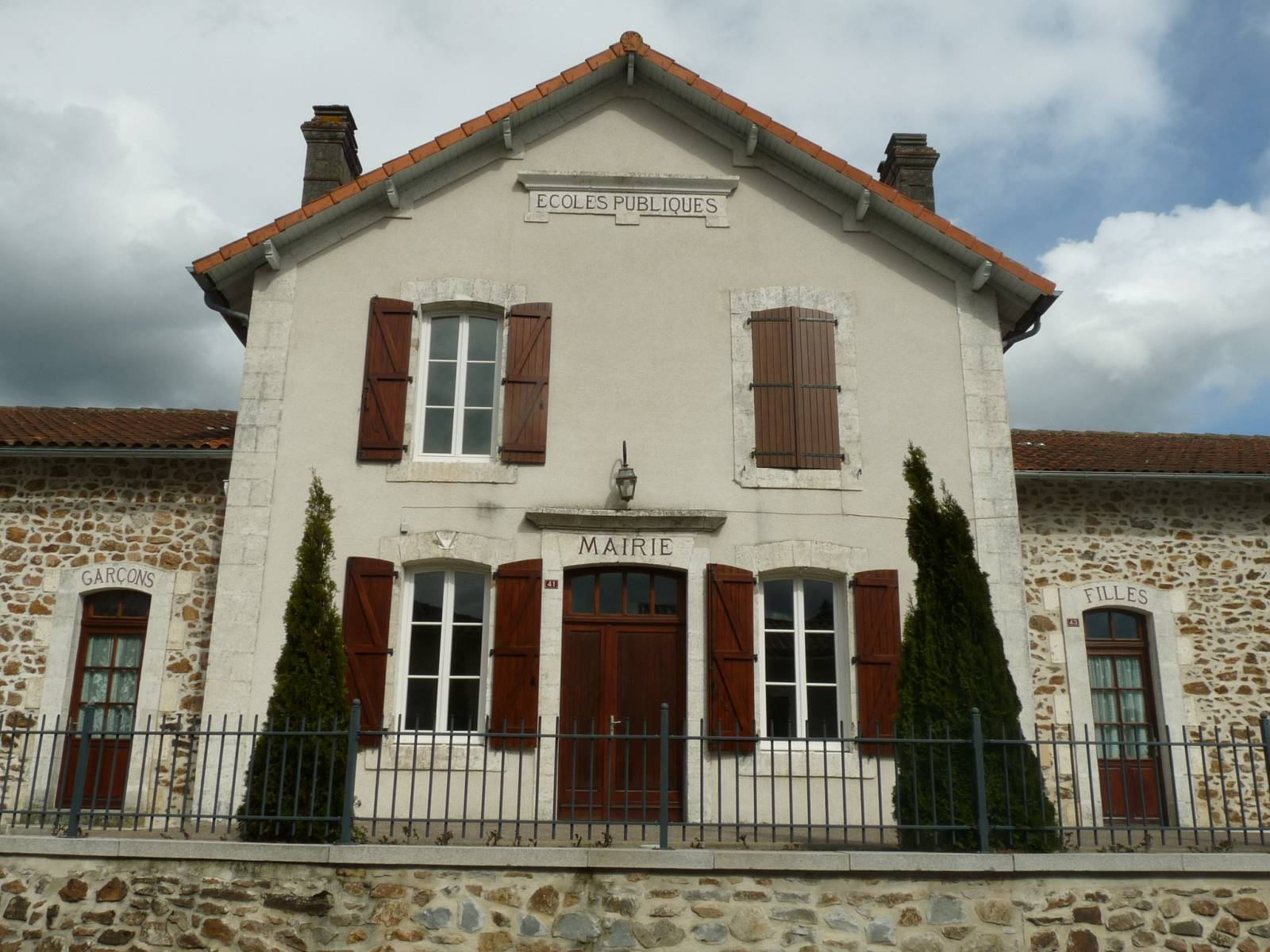
- Town hall
- Location of La Péruse
- Location within France Location within Nouvelle-Aquitaine
- Coordinates: 45°52′42″N 0°37′06″E
- Country: France
- Region: Nouvelle-Aquitaine
- Department: Charente
- Arrondissement: Confolens
- Canton: Charente-Vienne
- Commune: Terres-de-Haute-Charente
- Area^{1}: 8.52 km^{2} (3.29 sq mi)
- Elevation: 254 m (833 ft)
- Highest elevation: 251 m (823 ft)
- Lowest elevation: 158 m (518 ft)
- Population (2023): 481
  - Density: 56.5/km^{2} (146/sq mi)
- Time zone: UTC+01:00 (CET)
  - Summer (DST): UTC+02:00 (CEST)
- Postal code: 16270
- ^{1} French Land Register data, which excludes lakes, ponds, glaciers > 1 km^{2} (0.386 sq mi or 247 acres) and river estuaries.

La Péruse (French pronunciation: [la peʁyz]; Occitan: La Peirusa) is a former commune in the Charente department in southwestern France. On 1 January 2019, it was merged into the new commune Terres-de-Haute-Charente.

== See also ==
- Communes of the Charente department
