= Mediolanum Santonum =

Roman town in Gallia Aquitania, now Saintes

Coordinates: 45°44′47″N 0°38′00″W

Mediolanum Santonum was a Roman town in Gallia Aquitania, now Saintes. It was founded in about 20 BC in connection with an expansion of the network of Roman roads serving Burdigala. The name means 'centre of the Santones', the tribe that then inhabited the area; the town became an important center in the Roman province of Gallia Aquitania.

== Monuments ==
The principal extant monuments of the Roman period are:

- a Roman city gate now called the Arch of Germanicus
- a fairly large Roman lapidary collection
- a large amphitheatre

== Gallery ==
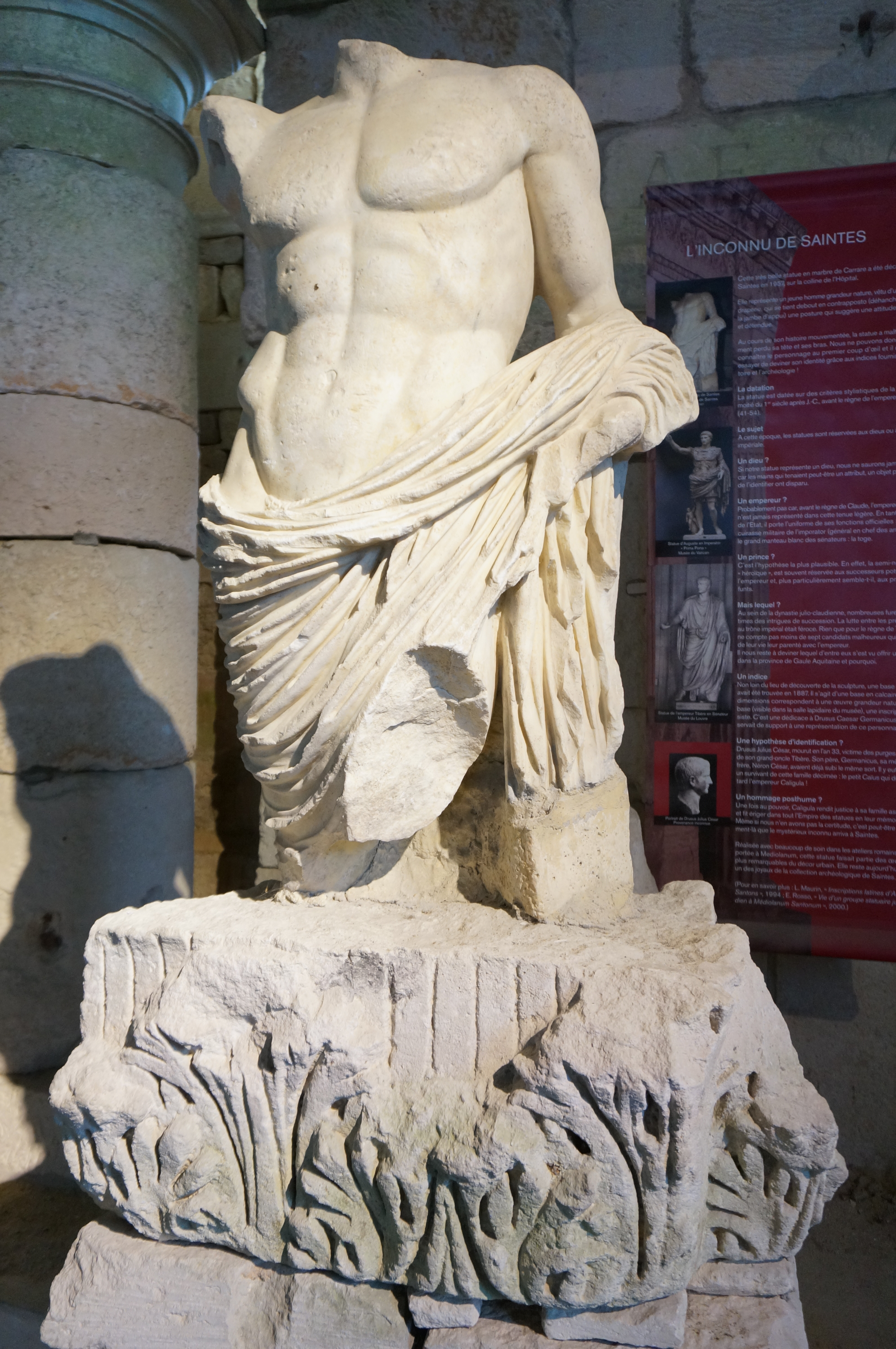
Bust

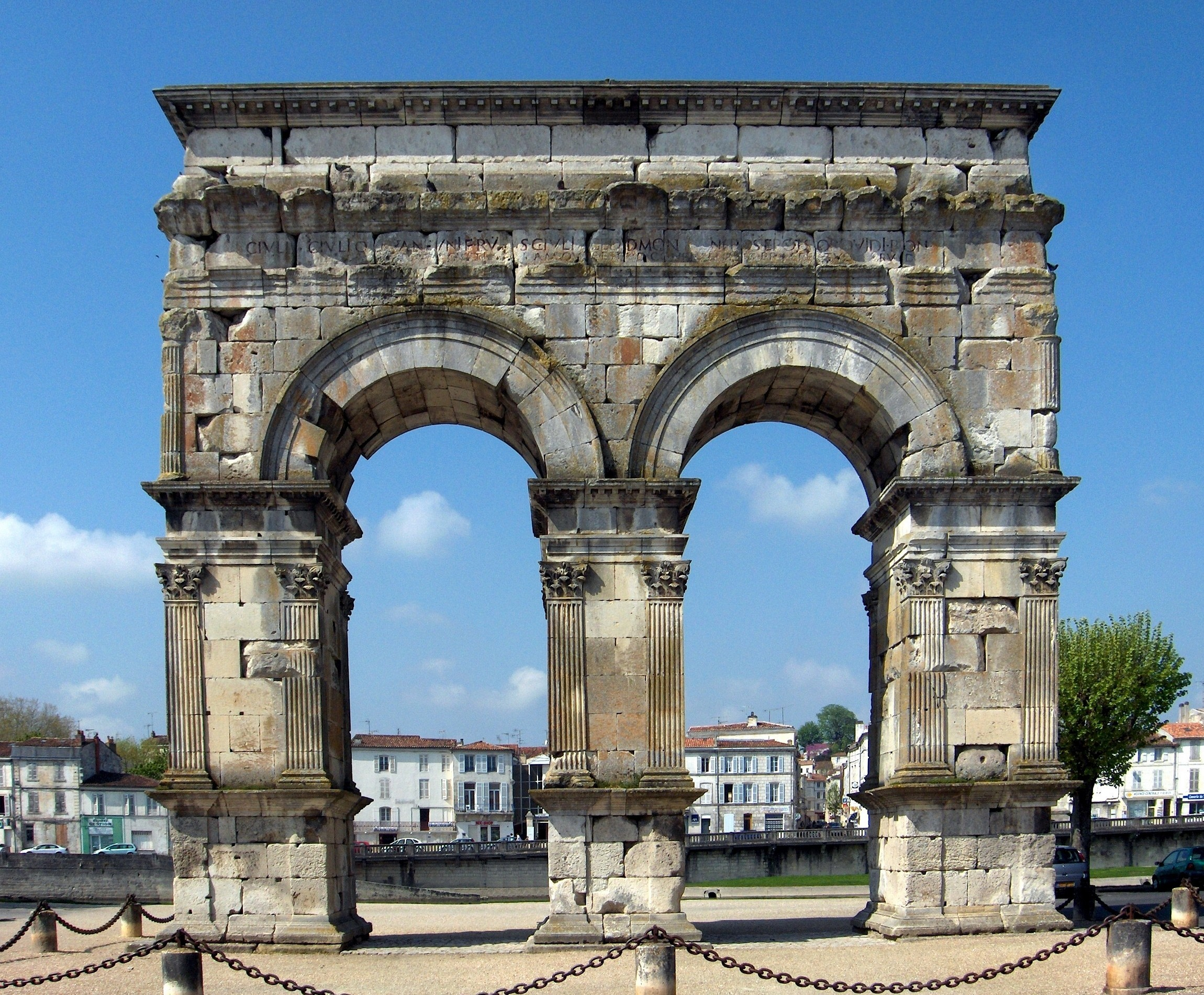
Arch of Germanicus

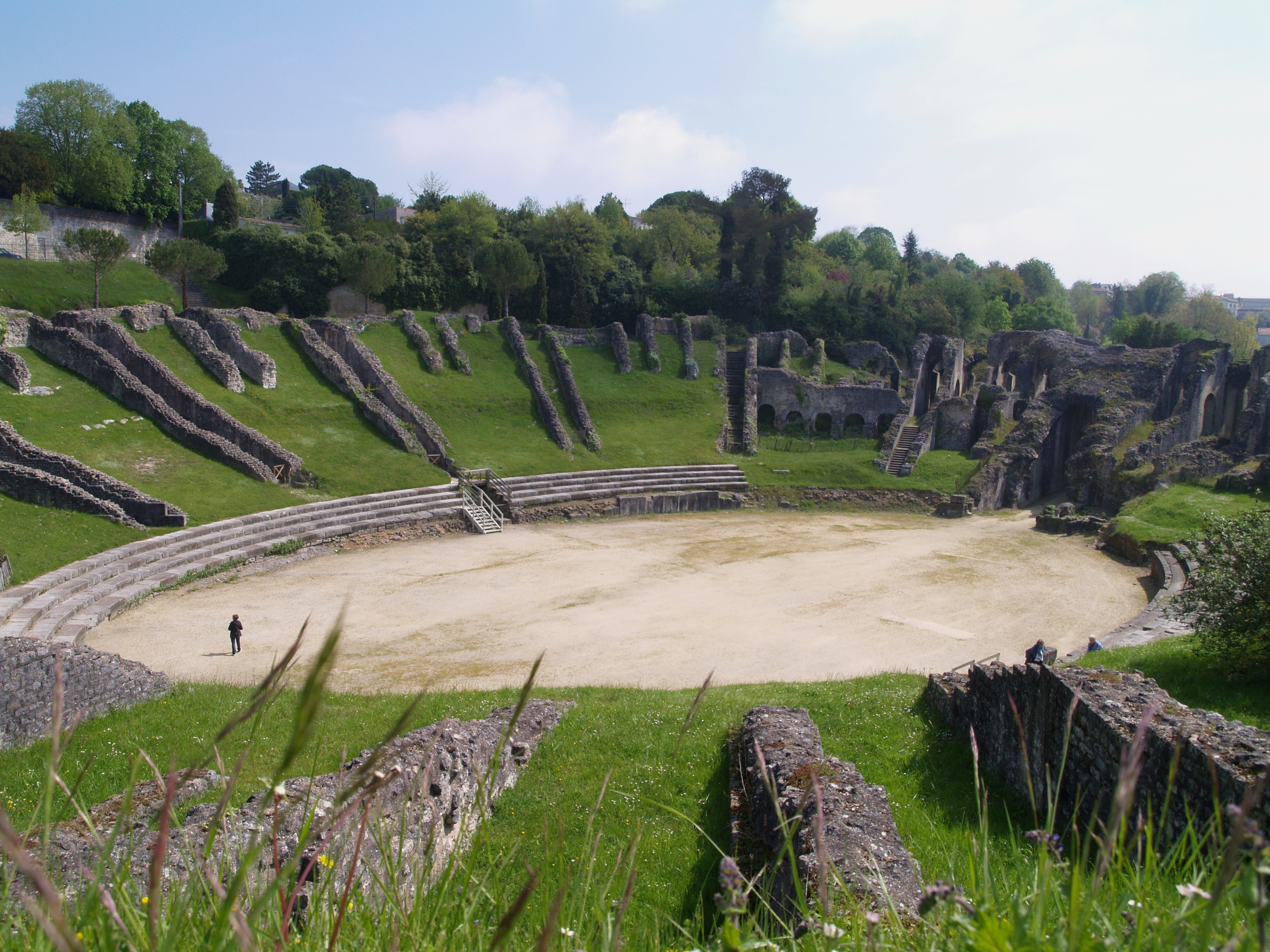
The amphitheatre

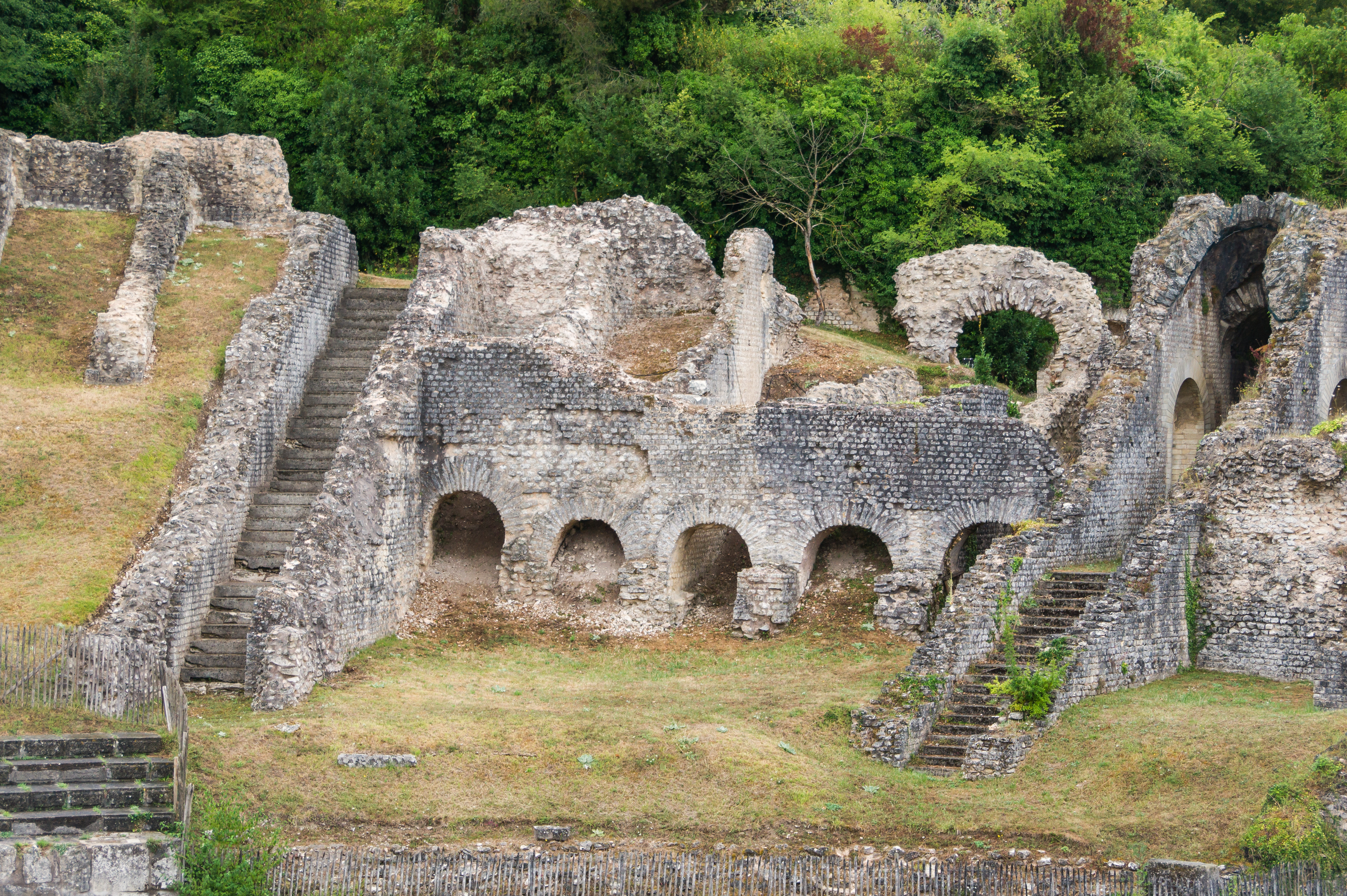
Close up of the vomitoria of the Roman amphitheatre

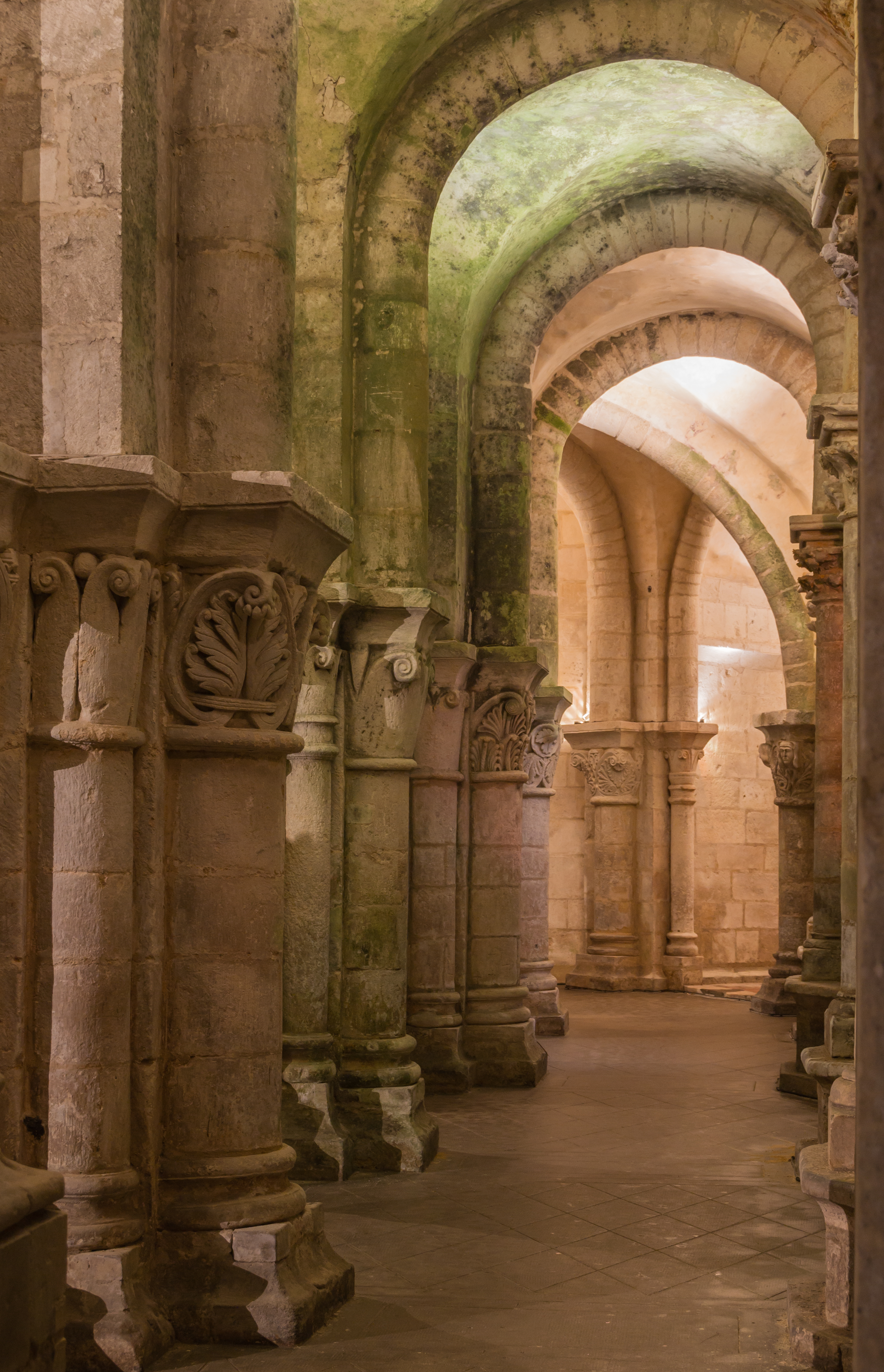
Deambulatory north Saint-Eutropius romanesque Basilica Saintes Charente-Maritime
