= Argentonia =

Argentinian consumer virtual reality product manufacturer

Argentonia S.R.L.
- Formerly: Argentonia S.R.L. (2007–2010)
- Type: LLC
- Industry: Internet; Immersive technology; Virtual computing; Computer software; Virtual world; Digital Marketing; Advertising
- Founded: May 10, 2007; 19 years ago in Buenos Aires, Argentina
- Founders: Leonardo Penotti
- Headquarters: Buenos Aires, Argentina
- Area served: Latin America and Spain
- Website: argentonia.com.ar

Argentonia S.R.L. was a limited liability company to commercialize immersion (virtual reality) products in Argentina. It was founded in October 2007 by Leonardo Penotti and three partners while he was a student at Universidad Tecnológica Nacional in Rosario, Argentina.

== History ==
Its commercial office was based in the city of Buenos Aires, where it was designated by the business registry of the Autonomous City of Buenos Aires with a new category of company in the country, virtual world development. It had four founding partners and more than 10 employees among its permanent staff and external consultants.

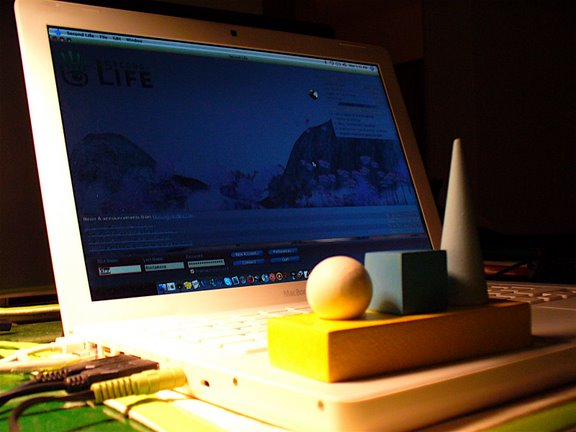
The official merchandising of Argentonia.

The Rosario engineer Leonardo Penotti was the only partner outside the city of Buenos Aires.

In 2007, it obtained the partnership in the Spanish-language users registry in Argentina of the immersive platform Second Life, owned by Linden Lab.

The company began using the open-source server platform for hosting virtual worlds and metaverses OpenSimulator in its commercial developments in 2008, hosting it on its own virtual dedicated server.

In the active period of the company, its founders give talks, interviews, workshops and exhibitions in institutions on Elearning, immersive education, virtual technology in marketing, gamification, among other topics throughout Argentina, Latin America and Spain.

It remained active until 2010 after the dissolution in common agreement of its founding partners.

== Corporate culture ==
Among the services they offered were digital marketing on Web 2.0 platforms, digital media projects, internet branding and produce techno-cultural concepts.

Mainly, they designed immersive dynamic contexts to promote new digital tools in companies, institutions and organizations such as remote working, educational technology and gamification developments.

== Media presence ==
The company's brand was reinforced through special television programs, where staff members were interviewed, making known the projects that it was carrying out.

The television notes were broadcast on América Noticias, Telefe Noticias and CNN in Spanish.

In addition, special customer events were held where they could see some of the company's developments, such as the RSM, el resumen de los medios tv show and the Sedal Virtual product launch event.

== Applications ==
=== Journalism ===
In 2007 the company increase its media presence by developing an immersive radio broadcast in Argentina in conjunction with Argentine journalist Jorge Lanata on his morning show Lanata PM on Radio AM del Plata.

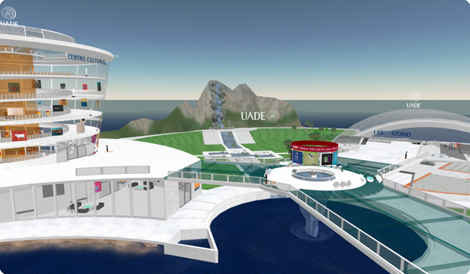
View of the Virtual Campus of UADE made by Argentonia.

The avatar developed by the company was called "Lanatron" and it was the journalist's 3D alter ego so that he could interact with his audience. The broadcast was covered by the main newspapers in the country such as La Nación, Clarín and Infobae.

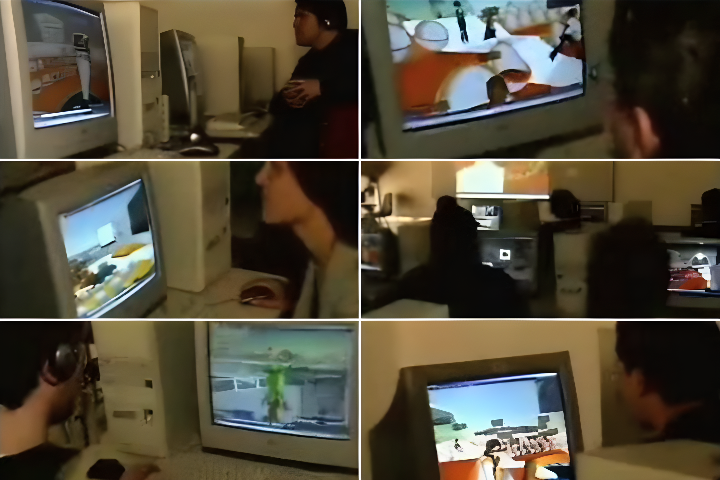
Students using the virtual campus of UADE University developed by Argentonia.

The virtual space in radio format was recreated through a simulation with an auditorium and musical animation area, where listeners could also interact with the hosts in real time through thematic panels programmed with audios and texts.

The audio streaming of the original broadcast of the radio program was carried out within the virtual area.

Argentine journalists Luciana Geuna and Reynaldo Sietecase also participated in this event.

=== Education ===
The Universidad Argentina de la Empresa (UADE) inaugurated its immersive virtual campus in Second Life in 2007, thus becoming the first Latin American university to have its institutional space on this platform. The development was entirely carried out by the company.

Institutions such as Public University of Navarre (UPNA), Harvard, Stanford and Oxford already had a presence on this platform.

The UADE Virtual Campus was equipped with a cultural center, an auditorium, a reporting center and a laboratory.

In the cultural center, related to the area of arts and project disciplines, exhibitions of selected works were held, such as the "Second UADE National Painting Contest", where various seminars and workshops were also held.

The auditorium, allowed the virtual and remote dictation of classes, conferences, seminars and consultation classes. Speakers could project real-time video, slide presentations on an interactive whiteboard.

The information center acted as the core of the complex, being the center for the reception and distribution of online students to the rest of the virtual complex.

The laboratory was the center of experiences for learning 3D design, interface development and programming languages.
