= Courbillac =

- Commune
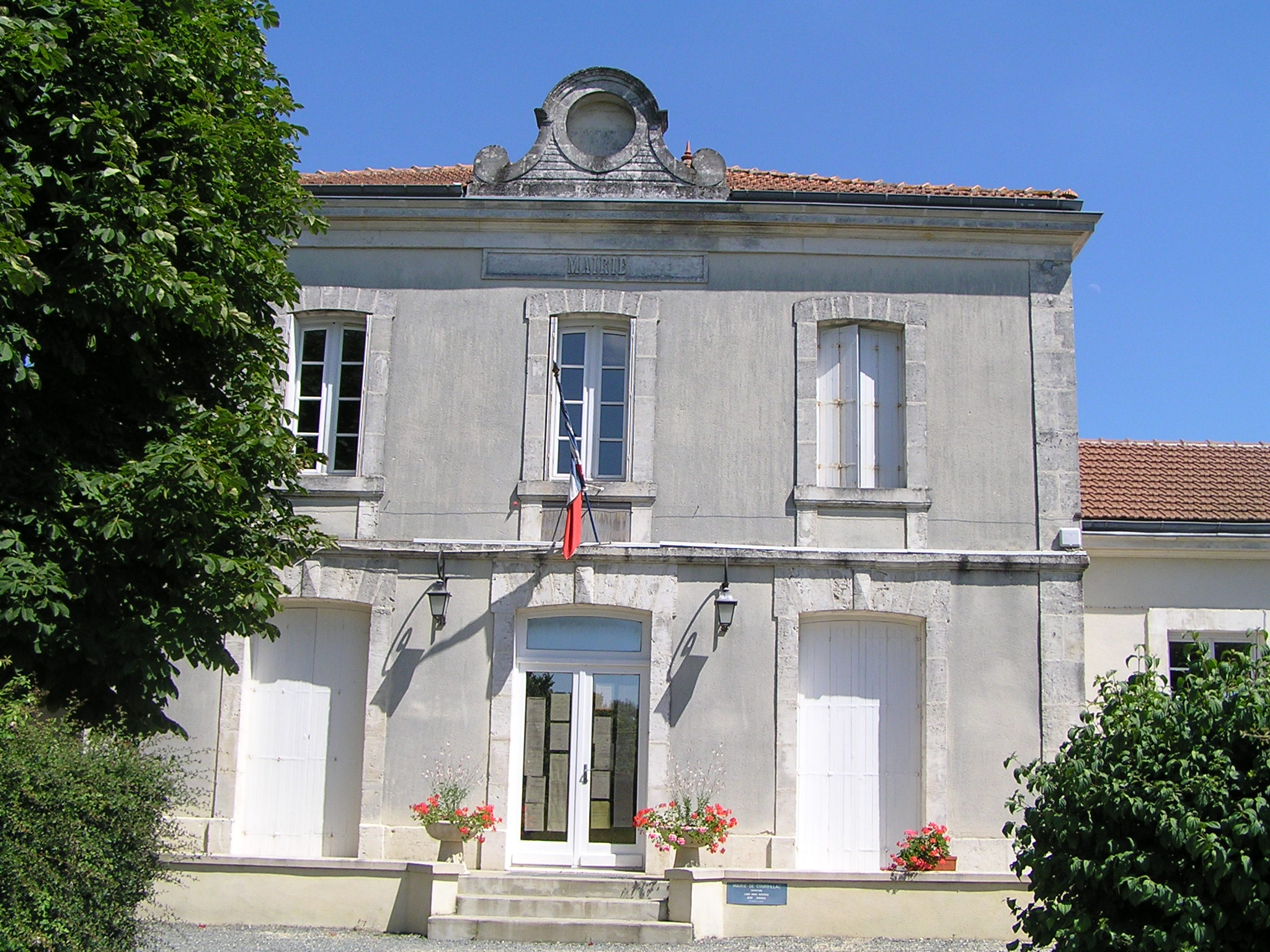
- Town hall
- Location of Courbillac
- Location within France Location within Nouvelle-Aquitaine
- Coordinates: 45°46′07″N 0°10′46″W
- Country: France
- Region: Nouvelle-Aquitaine
- Department: Charente
- Arrondissement: Cognac
- Canton: Val de Nouère
- Intercommunality: Rouillacais

Government
  - Mayor (2020–2026): Gilles Ripoche
- Area^{1}: 11.83 km^{2} (4.57 sq mi)
- Elevation: 38 m (125 ft)
- Highest elevation: 70 m (230 ft)
- Lowest elevation: 25 m (82 ft)
- Population (2023): 725
  - Density: 61.3/km^{2} (159/sq mi)
- Time zone: UTC+01:00 (CET)
  - Summer (DST): UTC+02:00 (CEST)
- INSEE/Postal code: 16109 /16200
- ^{1} French Land Register data, which excludes lakes, ponds, glaciers > 1 km^{2} (0.386 sq mi or 247 acres) and river estuaries.

Courbillac (French pronunciation: [kuʁbijak]) is a commune in the Charente department in southwestern France. In 1886, Philippe Delamain, a merchant from Jarnac, discovered by chance a cemetery from the Merovingian period in Herpes near Courbillac. He found an outstanding collection of weapons, brooches, jewellery and vases dating from the time when the Franks had settled in Herpes (5th–7th centuries AD). His collection was dispersed soon after its discovery but a significant proportion is in the British Museum, London.

== Population ==
Historical population
Year	Pop.	±% p.a.
1968	400	—
1975	426	+0.90%
1982	456	+0.98%
1990	473	+0.46%
1999	502	+0.66%
2007	576	+1.73%
2012	694	+3.80%
2017	733	+1.10%
2023	725	−0.18%
Source: INSEE

== See also ==
- Communes of the Charente department
