= Cherves =

- Commune
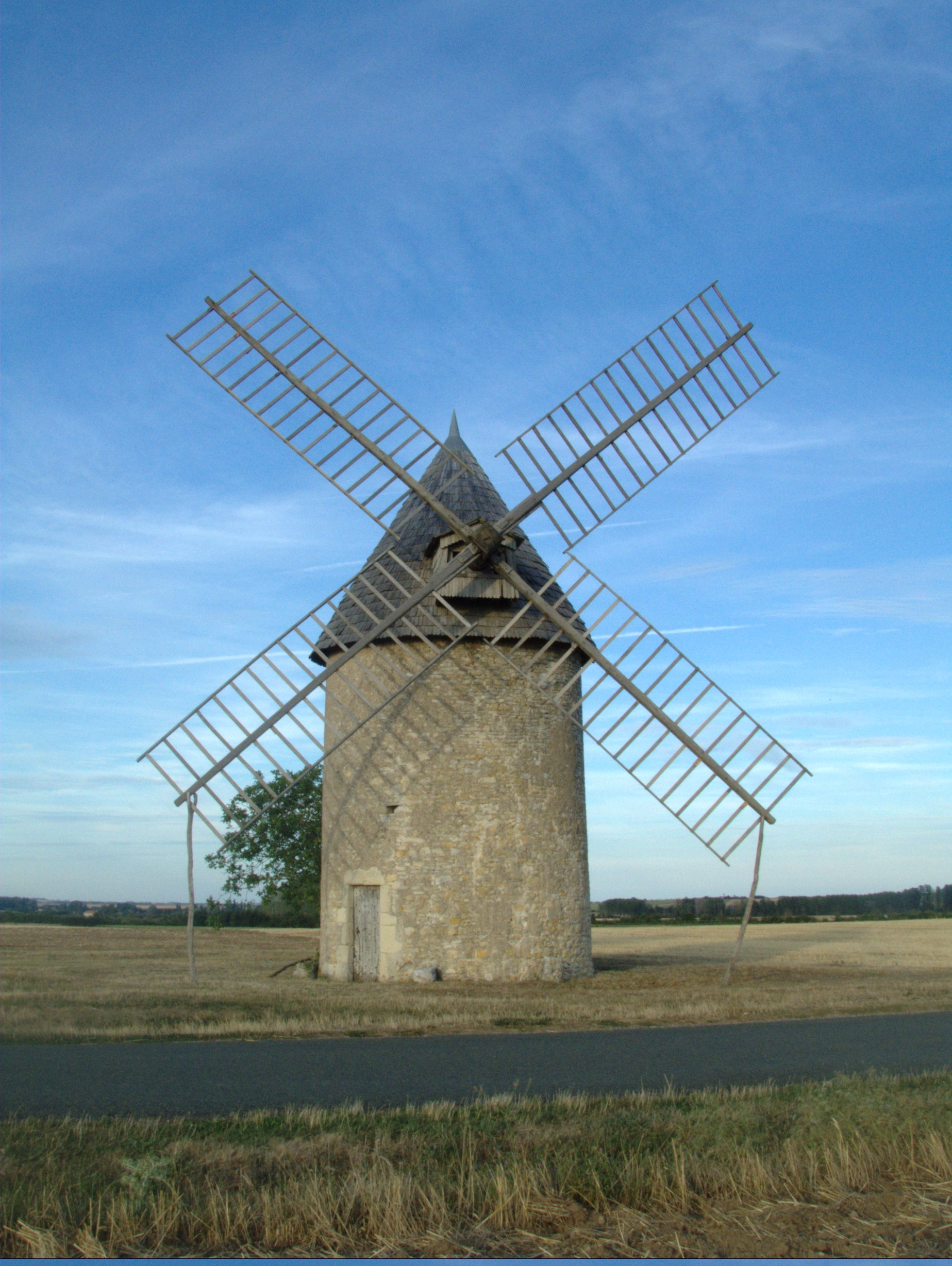
- The Tol windmill, in Cherves
- Location of Cherves
- Location within France Location within Nouvelle-Aquitaine
- Coordinates: 46°43′09″N 0°01′07″E
- Country: France
- Region: Nouvelle-Aquitaine
- Department: Vienne
- Arrondissement: Poitiers
- Canton: Migné-Auxances

Government
  - Mayor (2020–2026): Michèle Pétreau
- Area^{1}: 25.81 km^{2} (9.97 sq mi)
- Elevation: 152 m (499 ft)
- Highest elevation: 169 m (554 ft)
- Lowest elevation: 118 m (387 ft)
- Population (2023): 529
  - Density: 20.5/km^{2} (53.1/sq mi)
- Time zone: UTC+01:00 (CET)
  - Summer (DST): UTC+02:00 (CEST)
- INSEE/Postal code: 86073 /86170
- ^{1} French Land Register data, which excludes lakes, ponds, glaciers > 1 km^{2} (0.386 sq mi or 247 acres) and river estuaries.

Cherves (French pronunciation: [ʃɛʁv]) is a commune in the Vienne department in the Nouvelle-Aquitaine region in western France.

== See also ==
- Communes of the Vienne department
