= Villejoubert =

- Commune
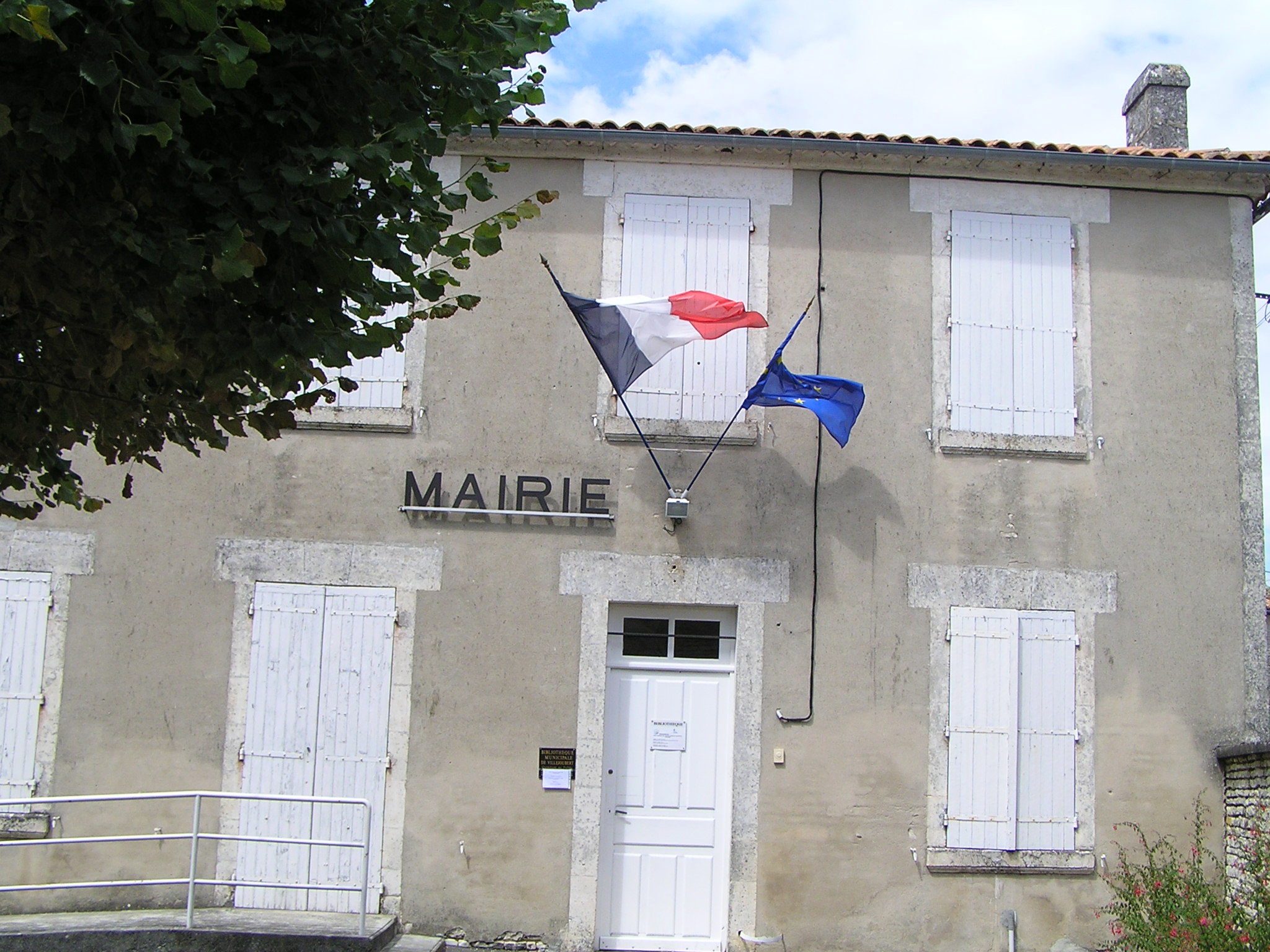
- Town hall
- Location of Villejoubert
- Location within France Location within Nouvelle-Aquitaine
- Coordinates: 45°48′16″N 0°10′34″E
- Country: France
- Region: Nouvelle-Aquitaine
- Department: Charente
- Arrondissement: Confolens
- Canton: Boixe-et-Manslois

Government
  - Mayor (2020–2026): Raymond Sevrit
- Area^{1}: 7.82 km^{2} (3.02 sq mi)
- Elevation: 125 m (410 ft)
- Highest elevation: 146 m (479 ft)
- Lowest elevation: 73 m (240 ft)
- Population (2023): 381
  - Density: 48.7/km^{2} (126/sq mi)
- Time zone: UTC+01:00 (CET)
  - Summer (DST): UTC+02:00 (CEST)
- INSEE/Postal code: 16412 /16560
- ^{1} French Land Register data, which excludes lakes, ponds, glaciers > 1 km^{2} (0.386 sq mi or 247 acres) and river estuaries.

Villejoubert (French pronunciation: [vilʒubɛʁ]) is a commune in the Charente department in southwestern France.

== Population ==
Historical population
Year	Pop.	±% p.a.
1968	127	—
1975	165	+3.81%
1982	256	+6.48%
1990	279	+1.08%
1999	293	+0.55%
2007	331	+1.54%
2012	339	+0.48%
2017	332	−0.42%
2023	381	+2.32%
Source: INSEE

== See also ==
- Communes of the Charente department
