= Genouillac, Charente =

Genouillac
- Part of Terres-de-Haute-Charente
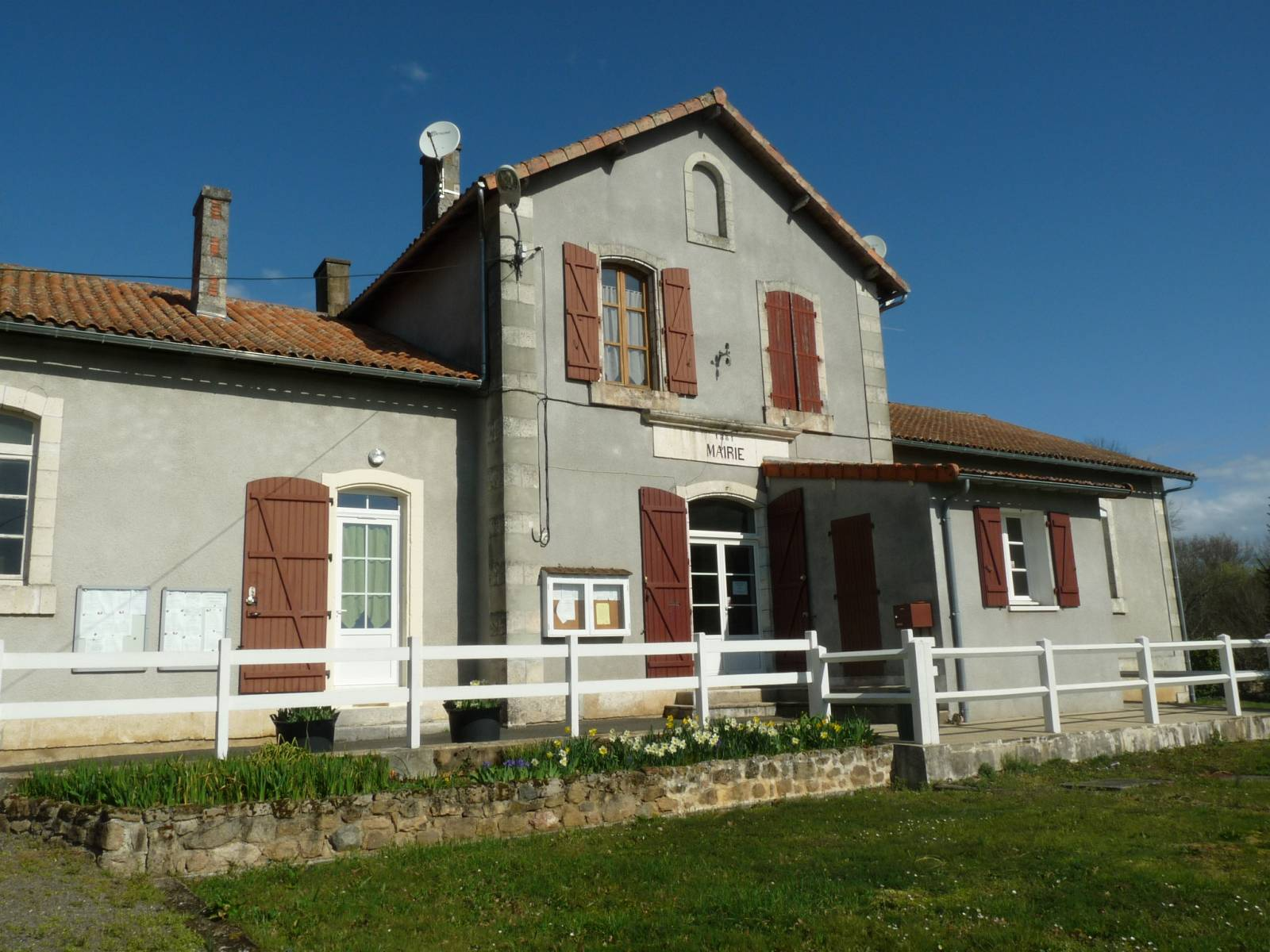
- Town hall
- Location of Genouillac
- Location within France Location within Nouvelle-Aquitaine
- Coordinates: 45°51′13″N 0°34′19″E
- Country: France
- Region: Nouvelle-Aquitaine
- Department: Charente
- Arrondissement: Confolens
- Canton: Charente-Bonnieure
- Commune: Terres-de-Haute-Charente
- Area^{1}: 14.59 km^{2} (5.63 sq mi)
- Elevation: 227 m (745 ft)
- Highest elevation: 267 m (876 ft)
- Lowest elevation: 154 m (505 ft)
- Population (2023): 610
  - Density: 42/km^{2} (110/sq mi)
- Time zone: UTC+01:00 (CET)
  - Summer (DST): UTC+02:00 (CEST)
- Postal code: 16270
- ^{1} French Land Register data, which excludes lakes, ponds, glaciers > 1 km^{2} (0.386 sq mi or 247 acres) and river estuaries.

Genouillac (French pronunciation: [ʒənujak]; Occitan: Janolhac) is a former commune in the Charente department in southwestern France. On 1 January 2019, it was merged into the new commune Terres-de-Haute-Charente.

== See also ==
- Communes of the Charente department
