= Arch of Germanicus =

Ancient Roman arch in Saintes, Charente-Maritime, France

Coordinates: 45°44′45.3″N 0°37′44.3″W

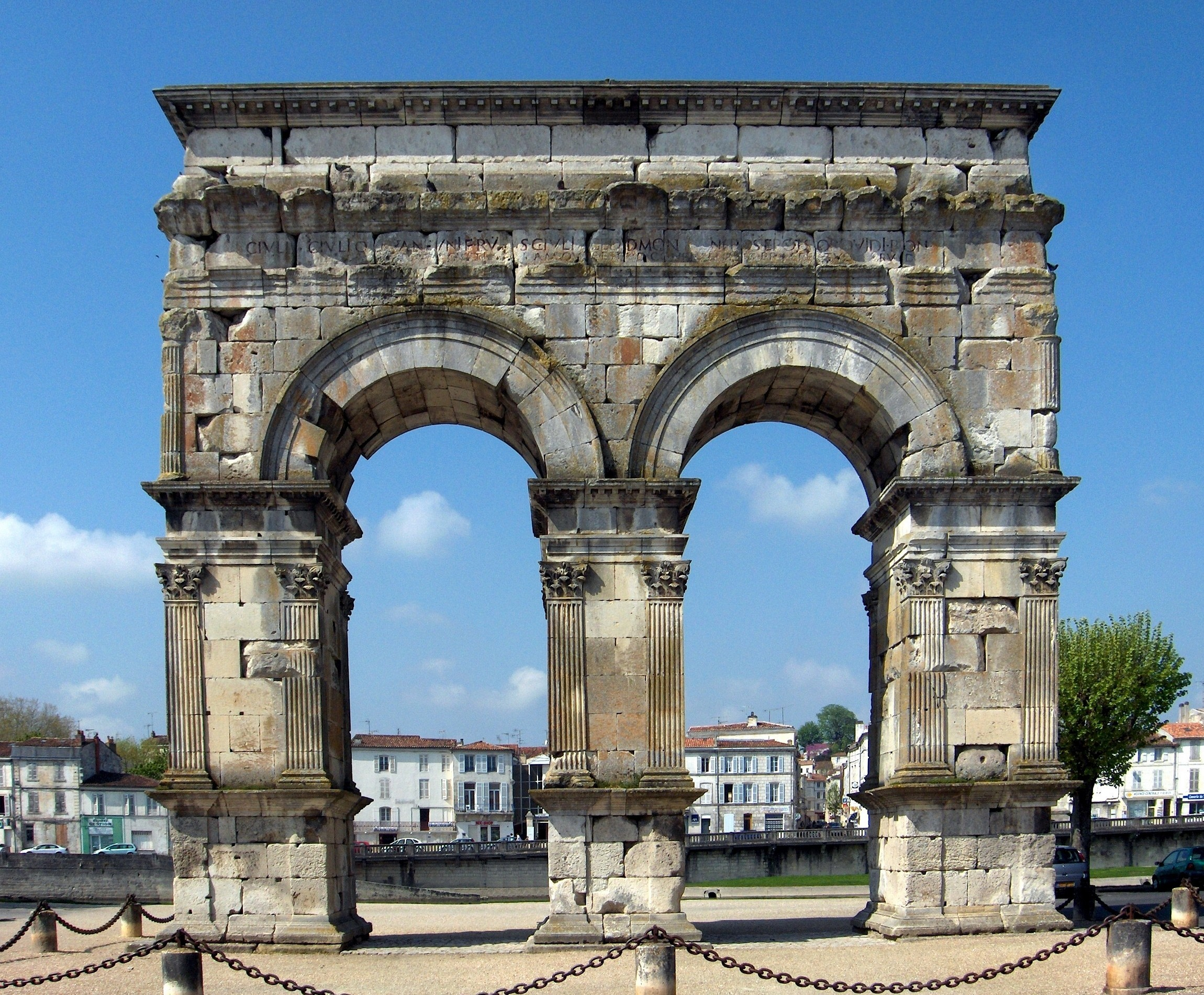
Arch of Germanicus

There was also an Arch of Drusus and Germanicus, made up of two arches built in 19 in honour of Nero Claudius Drusus and Germanicus either side of the Temple of Mars Ultor in the Forum of Augustus, in honour of their German campaigns.

The Arch of Germanicus is an ancient Roman arch in Saintes, Charente-Maritime in France. It was built in 18 or 19 by a rich citizen of the town (then known as Mediolanum Santonum), C. Julius Rufus, and dedicated to the emperor Tiberius, his son Drusus Julius Caesar, and his adoptive son Germanicus. It has two bays and was originally sited over the terminus of the Roman road from Lyon to Saintes. On the proposal of Prosper Mérimée in 1843 it was moved fifteen metres during works on quays along the river, and it was restored in 1851.

== Inscription ==
=== Dedication ===
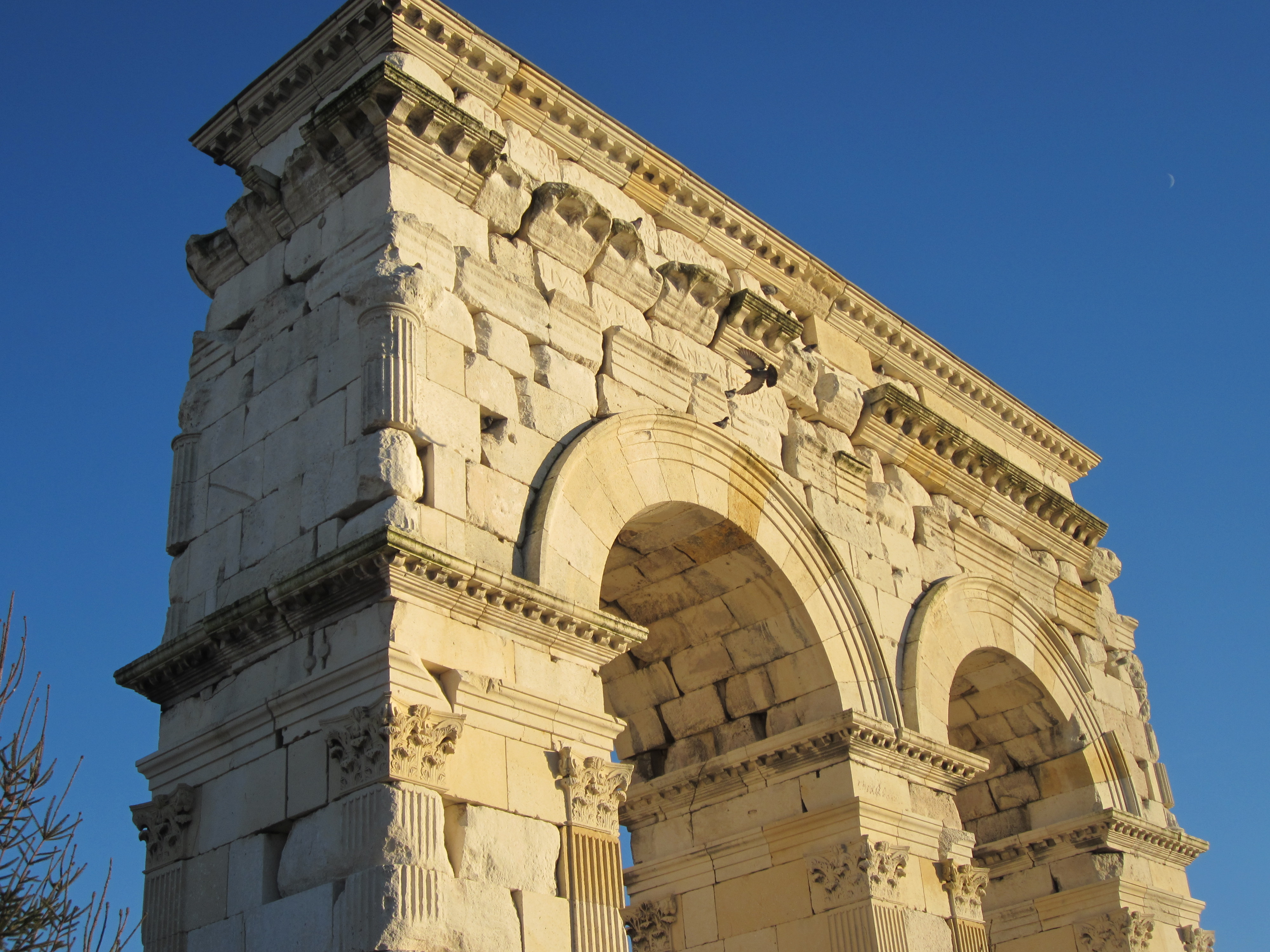
Arch of Germanicus

Right next to Paule's place, is this very impressive Roman arch. The dedicatory inscription on the attic (CIL XIII, 1036 = Inscriptions Latines des Trois Gaules, 148) is heavily worn in the area naming the emperor Tiberius and his son Drusus. The dedication to his nephew and adoptive son, Germanicus, is better preserved and not only allows the arch to be dated to 18 or 19 but also gives it its usual name:

GERMANICO [CAESA]R[I] TI(berii) AUG(usti) F(ilio)
DIVI AUG(usti) NEP(oti) DIVI IULI PRONEP(oti)
[AUGU]RI FLAM(ini) AUGUST(ali) CO(n)S(uli) II IMP(eratori) II

"To Germanicus Caesar, son of Tiberius Augustus, grandson of the deified Augustus, great-grandson of the deified Julius, augur, flamen, augustales, consul for the second time, hailed imperator for the second time."

=== Donor ===
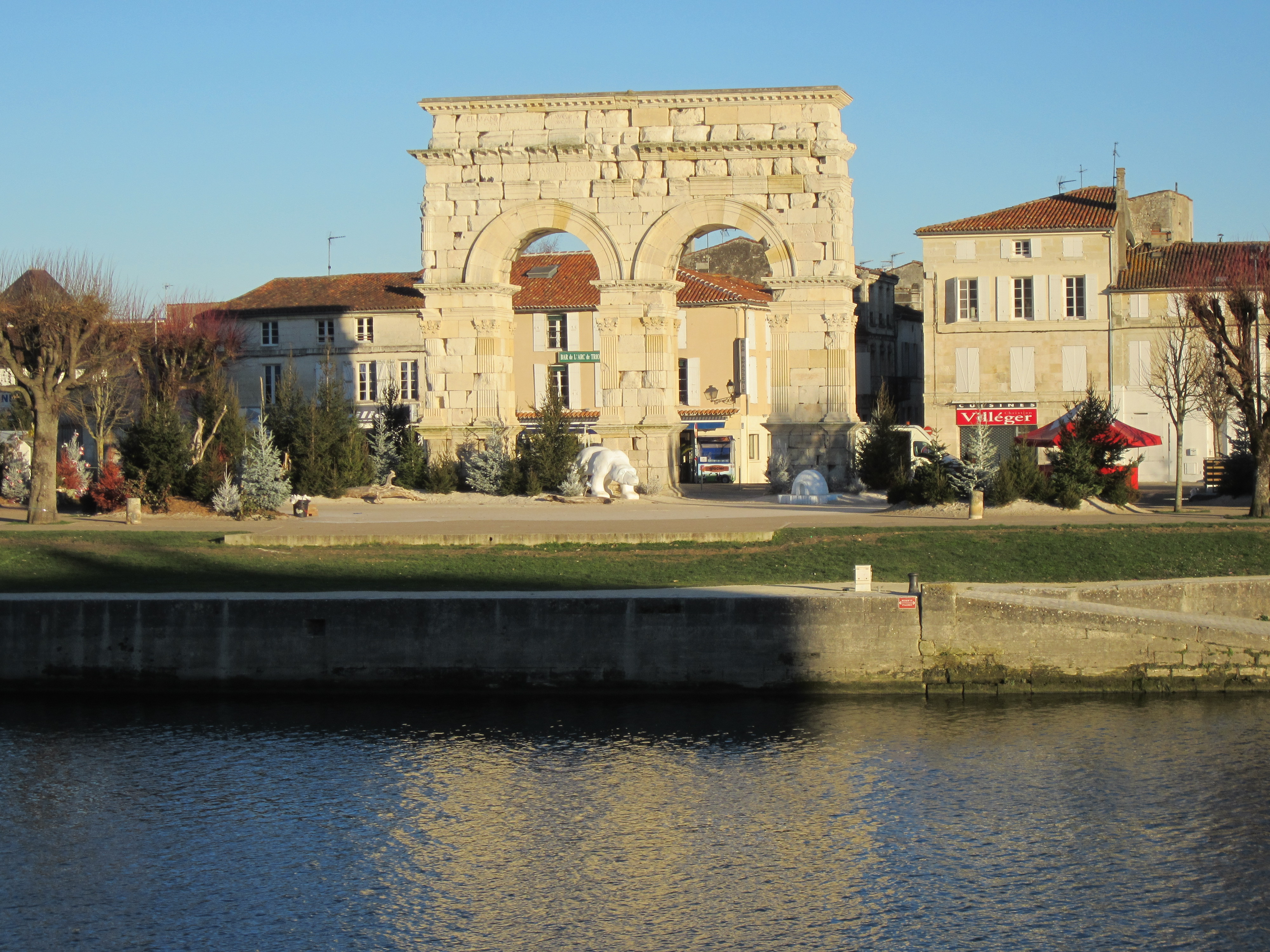
Arch of Germanicus

Below the dedication the inscription in the entablature gives the name of the arch's financer, C. Iulius Rufus and his ancestors. This is repeated on all 4 sides of the arch.

C(aius) IVLI[us] C(aii) IVLI(i) OTUANEUNI F(ilius) RVFVS C(aii) IVLI(i) GEDOMONIS NEPOS, EPOTSOVIRIDI PRON(epos)
[SACERDOS ROMAE ET AUG]USTI [AD A]RAM QU[A]E EST AD CONFLUENT[E]M, PRAEFECTUS [FAB]RUM, D(at).

"Caius Julius Rufus, son of Caius Julius Otuaneunus, grandson of Caius Julius Gedemo, great-grandson of Epotsovirid(i)us, priest of Rome and of Augustus at the altar at Confluens, prefect of works, gave [this arch]".

The difficulties in establishing the text, which is heavily worn, have long meant that Catuaneunius has been read as the name of Rufus's father and Agedomopas as the name of Rufus's grandfather. Asserting this lineage witnesses to Rufus's aristocratic consciousness and his family's long-standing at the head of the city. Julius Gedemo was the first member of the family to receive Roman citizenship, probably from Julius Caesar (taking his name as his own) and possibly during the Gallic Wars or shortly afterwards. Rufus was the first member of the family to adopt a completely Roman name rather than retaining a third name that was Celtic in origin, showing the Romanization chosen by Gallic noblemen.

This notable Gaul, a third-generation Roman citizen, was also known as a priest of Rome and of Augustus through his dedicatory inscription found on the amphitheatre at Lugdunum (Lyon), known here as Confluens.

== See also ==
- List of Roman triumphal arches

== Bibliography ==
- (in French) L. Maurin, Saintes Antique des origines à la fin du sixième siècle après Jésus Christ, Saintes, 1978.
