= Charmé =

- Commune
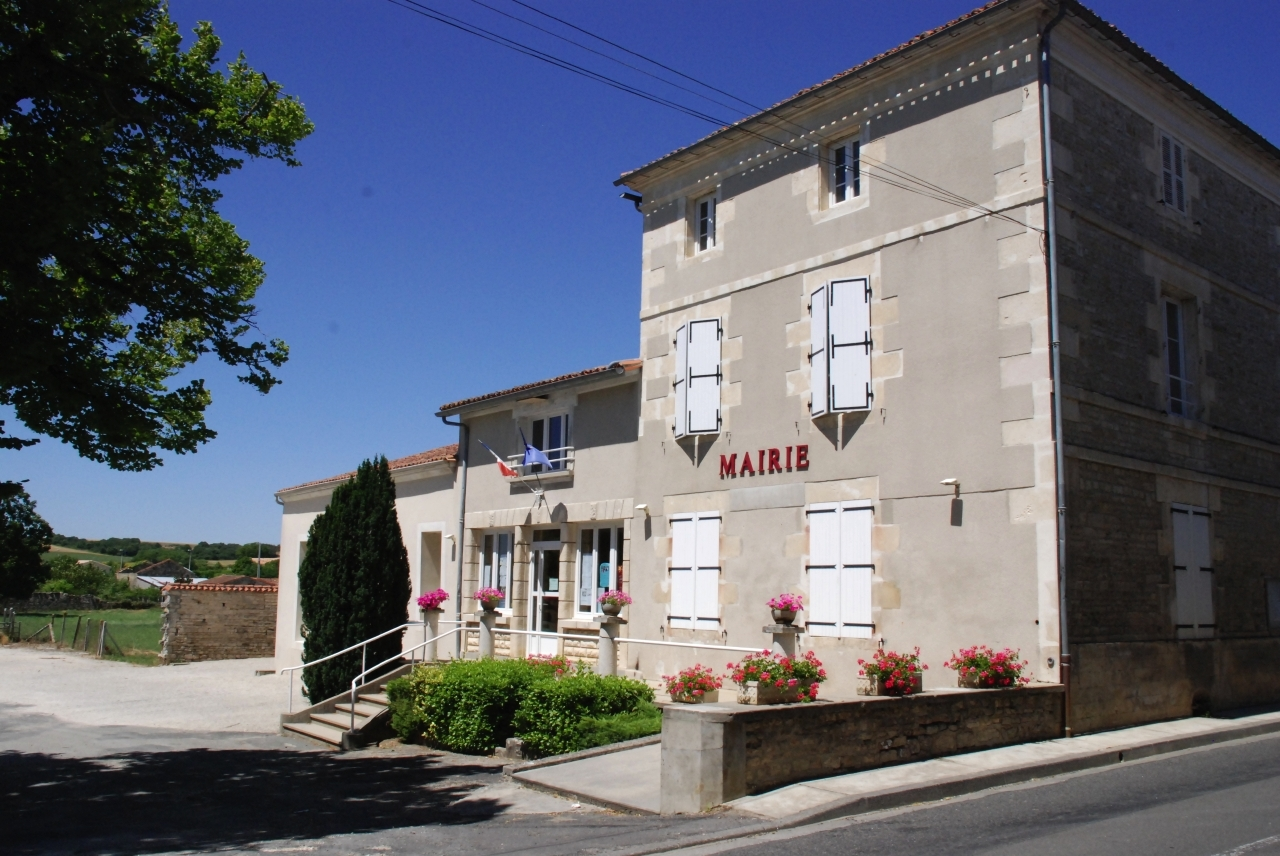
- Town hall

- Coat of arms
- Location of Charmé
- Location within France Location within Nouvelle-Aquitaine
- Coordinates: 45°57′11″N 0°07′04″E
- Country: France
- Region: Nouvelle-Aquitaine
- Department: Charente
- Arrondissement: Confolens
- Canton: Charente-Nord
- Intercommunality: Cœur de Charente

Government
  - Mayor (2020–2026): Bernard Borne
- Area^{1}: 11.42 km^{2} (4.41 sq mi)
- Elevation: 75 m (246 ft)
- Highest elevation: 131 m (430 ft)
- Lowest elevation: 63 m (207 ft)
- Population (2023): 336
  - Density: 29.4/km^{2} (76.2/sq mi)
- Time zone: UTC+01:00 (CET)
  - Summer (DST): UTC+02:00 (CEST)
- INSEE/Postal code: 16083 /16140
- ^{1} French Land Register data, which excludes lakes, ponds, glaciers > 1 km^{2} (0.386 sq mi or 247 acres) and river estuaries.

Charmé (French pronunciation: [ʃaʁme]) is a commune in the Charente department in southwestern France.

== Population ==
Historical population
Year	Pop.	±% p.a.
1968	452	—
1975	397	−1.84%
1982	410	+0.46%
1990	411	+0.03%
1999	407	−0.11%
2007	387	−0.63%
2012	364	−1.22%
2017	355	−0.50%
2023	336	−0.91%
Source: INSEE

== See also ==
- Communes of the Charente department
