= Saint-Cybardeaux =

- Commune
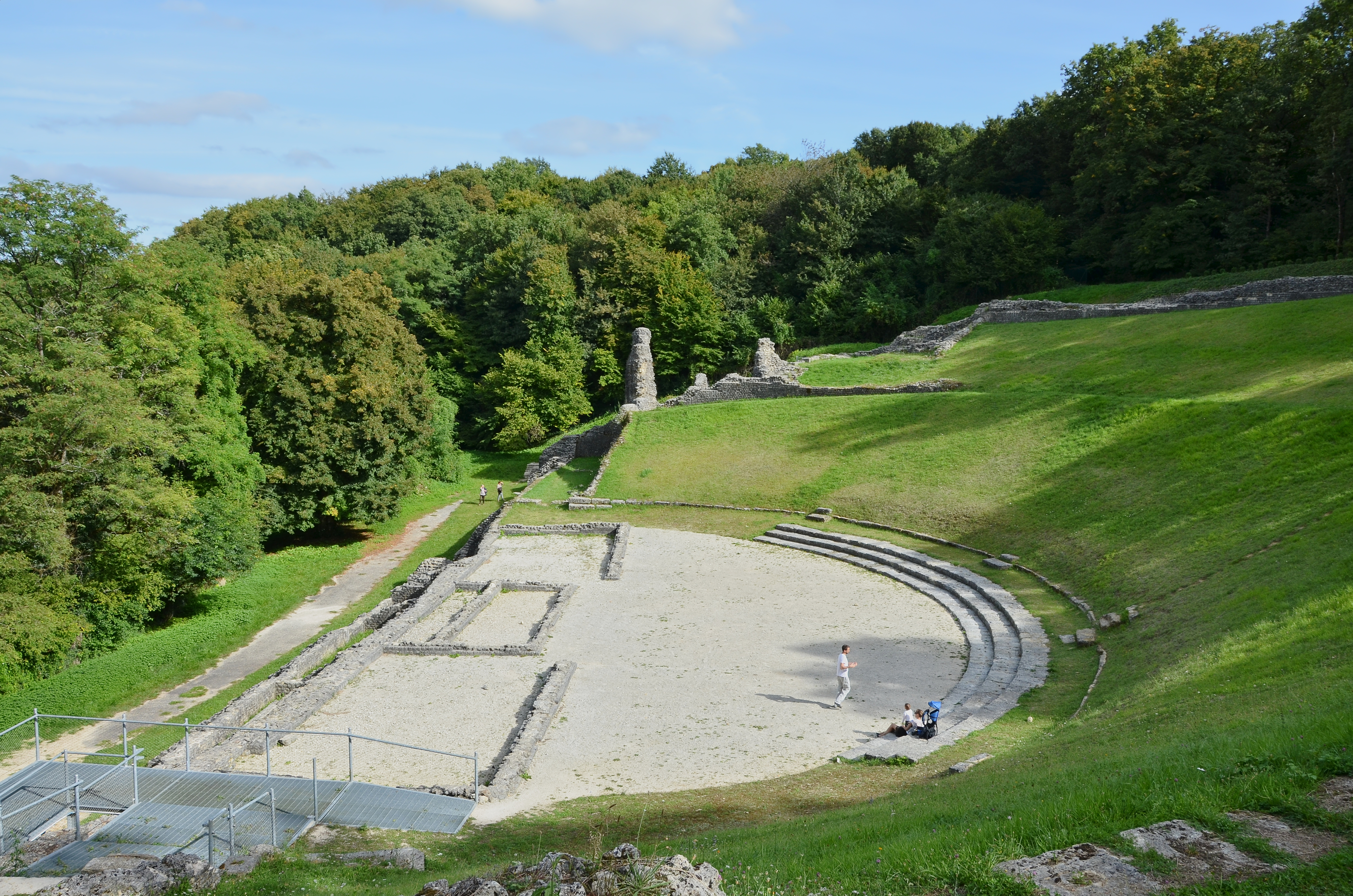
- Roman theater

- Coat of arms
- Location of Saint-Cybardeaux
- Location within France Location within Nouvelle-Aquitaine
- Coordinates: 45°46′10″N 0°01′40″W
- Country: France
- Region: Nouvelle-Aquitaine
- Department: Charente
- Arrondissement: Cognac
- Canton: Val de Nouère
- Intercommunality: Rouillacais

Government
  - Mayor (2020–2026): Francis Roy
- Area^{1}: 21 km^{2} (8.1 sq mi)
- Highest elevation: 163 m (535 ft)
- Lowest elevation: 74 m (243 ft)
- Population (2023): 771
  - Density: 37/km^{2} (95/sq mi)
- Time zone: UTC+01:00 (CET)
  - Summer (DST): UTC+02:00 (CEST)
- INSEE/Postal code: 16312 /16170
- Website: Official website
- ^{1} French Land Register data, which excludes lakes, ponds, glaciers > 1 km^{2} (0.386 sq mi or 247 acres) and river estuaries.

Saint-Cybardeaux (French pronunciation: [sɛ̃ sibaʁdo]) is a commune in the Charente department in southwestern France.

== Population ==
Historical population
Year	Pop.	±% p.a.
1968	739	—
1975	716	−0.45%
1982	670	−0.94%
1990	724	+0.97%
1999	738	+0.21%
2007	781	+0.71%
2012	823	+1.05%
2017	829	+0.15%
2023	771	−1.20%
Source: INSEE

== See also ==
- Communes of the Charente department
- List of Roman theatres
