= Canton of Chabanais =

Coordinates: 45°52′30″N 0°43′14″E

Chabanais
- Former canton
- Interactive map of Chabanais
- Country: France
- Region: Nouvelle-Aquitaine
- Department: Charente
- No. of communes: {{{nbcomm}}}
- Disbanded: 2015
- Area: 234 km^{2} (90 sq mi)
- Population (2012): 7,885
  - Density: 33.7/km^{2} (87.3/sq mi)

The canton of Chabanais is a former administrative division in central France. It had 7,885 inhabitants (2012). It was disbanded following the French canton reorganisation which came into effect in March 2015. It consisted of 11 communes, which joined the canton of Charente-Vienne in 2015:

- Chabanais
- Chabrac
- Chassenon
- Chirac
- Étagnac
- Exideuil
- La Péruse
- Pressignac
- Saint-Quentin-sur-Charente
- Saulgond
- Suris

== See also ==
- Cantons of the Charente department
