= Lesterps =

- Commune
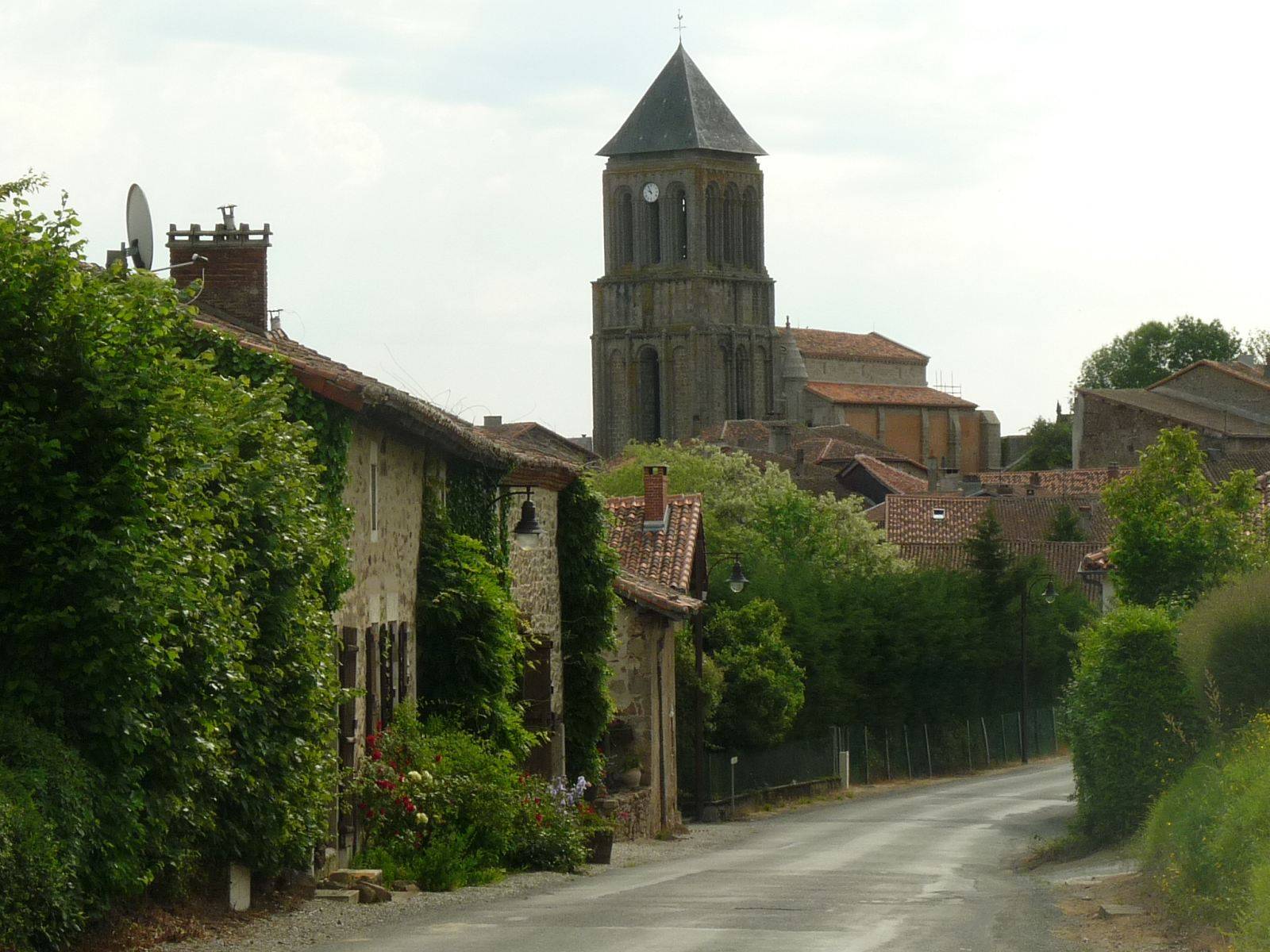
- Entering Lesterps from Confolens

- Coat of arms
- Location of Lesterps
- Location within France Location within Nouvelle-Aquitaine
- Coordinates: 46°00′41″N 0°46′53″E
- Country: France
- Region: Nouvelle-Aquitaine
- Department: Charente
- Arrondissement: Confolens
- Canton: Charente-Vienne
- Intercommunality: Charente Limousine

Government
  - Mayor (2020–2026): Daniel Soupizet
- Area^{1}: 36.03 km^{2} (13.91 sq mi)
- Elevation: 260 m (850 ft)
- Highest elevation: 275 m (902 ft)
- Lowest elevation: 170 m (560 ft)
- Population (2023): 439
  - Density: 12.2/km^{2} (31.6/sq mi)
- Time zone: UTC+01:00 (CET)
  - Summer (DST): UTC+02:00 (CEST)
- INSEE/Postal code: 16182 /16420
- ^{1} French Land Register data, which excludes lakes, ponds, glaciers > 1 km^{2} (0.386 sq mi or 247 acres) and river estuaries.

Lesterps (French pronunciation: [letɛʁ]; L'Esterp in Limousin, an Occitan dialect) is a commune in the Charente department in southwestern France.

== Geography ==
Lesterps is located in Charente Limousin, in the north-east of the Charente department and borders Haute-Vienne. The village of Lesterps, 9 km east of Confolens, is a major market town. It is 16 km from Chabanais, 17 km from Saint-Junien, 42 km from Limoges and 63 km from Angoulême.

The town is well served by roads. The D30, from Confolens to Limoges via Saint-Junien, crosses it from west to east, and the D29, from Saulgond to Brillac, crosses it from south to north. The D82 east of the village goes to Limoges via Saint-Christophe. The nearest train station is Chabanais, served by TER to Angoulême and Limoges.

== Population ==
Historical population
Year	Pop.	±% p.a.
1968	754	—
1975	623	−2.69%
1982	557	−1.59%
1990	560	+0.07%
1999	594	+0.66%
2007	498	−2.18%
2012	494	−0.16%
2017	479	−0.61%
2023	439	−1.44%
Source: INSEE

The inhabitants are called Lesterrois and Lesterroises in French.

== See also ==
- Communes of the Charente department
