= Saint-Germain-de-Confolens =

- Part of Confolens
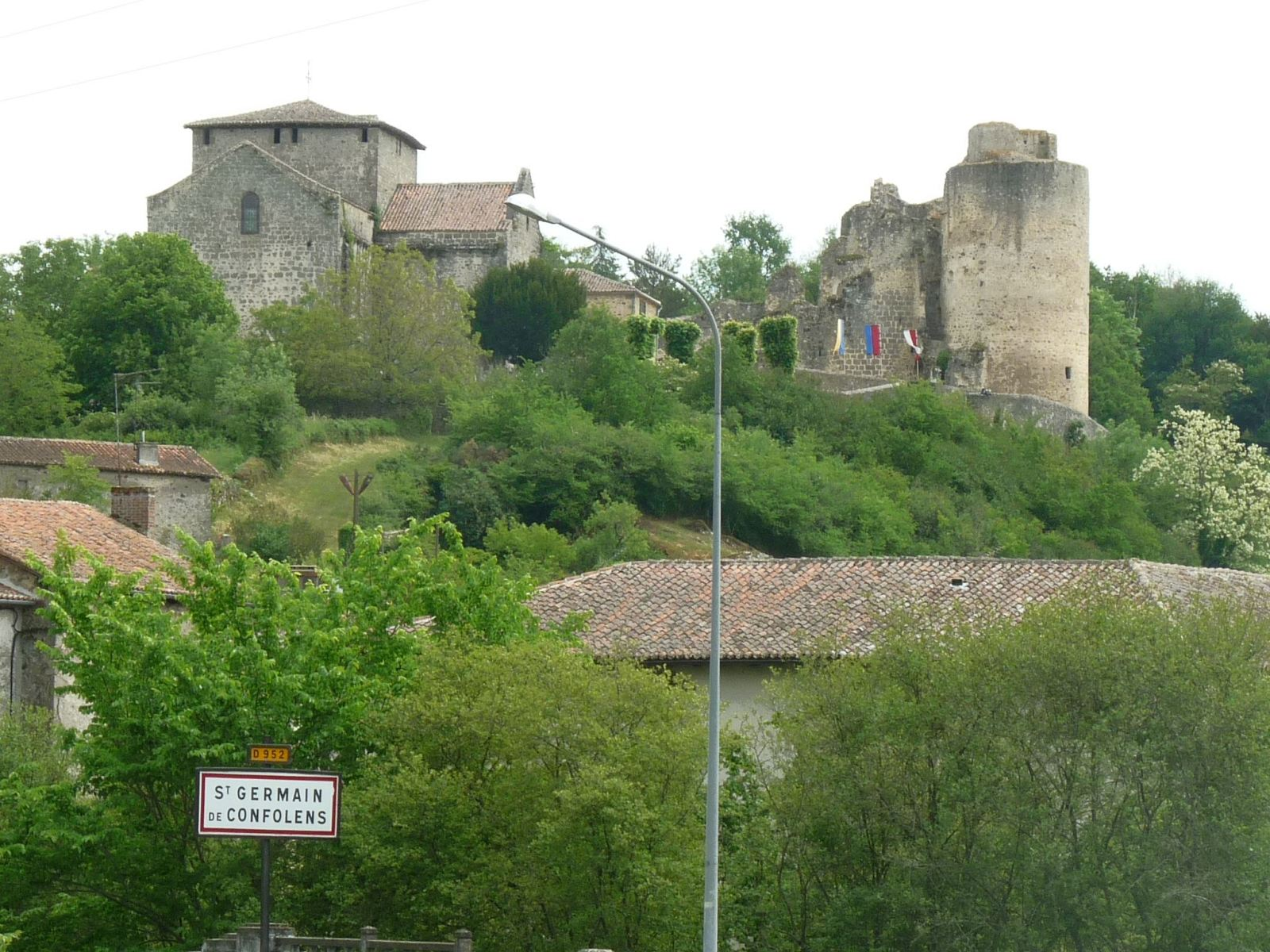
- Location of Saint-Germain-de-Confolens
- Location within France Location within Nouvelle-Aquitaine
- Coordinates: 46°03′14″N 0°41′07″E
- Country: France
- Region: Nouvelle-Aquitaine
- Department: Charente
- Arrondissement: Confolens
- Canton: Charente-Vienne
- Commune: Confolens
- Area^{1}: 4.67 km^{2} (1.80 sq mi)
- Elevation: 130 m (430 ft)
- Highest elevation: 213 m (699 ft)
- Lowest elevation: 122 m (400 ft)
- Population (2023): 73
  - Density: 16/km^{2} (40/sq mi)
- Time zone: UTC+01:00 (CET)
  - Summer (DST): UTC+02:00 (CEST)
- Postal code: 16500
- ^{1} French Land Register data, which excludes lakes, ponds, glaciers > 1 km^{2} (0.386 sq mi or 247 acres) and river estuaries.

Saint-Germain-de-Confolens (French pronunciation: [sɛ̃ ʒɛʁmɛ̃ də kɔ̃fɔlɑ̃], literally Saint-Germain of Confolens; Occitan: Sent German sus Vinhana) is a former commune in the Charente department in western France. On 1 January 2016, it was merged into the commune Confolens.

== See also ==
- Communes of the Charente department
