= Saint-Quentin-sur-Charente =

- Commune
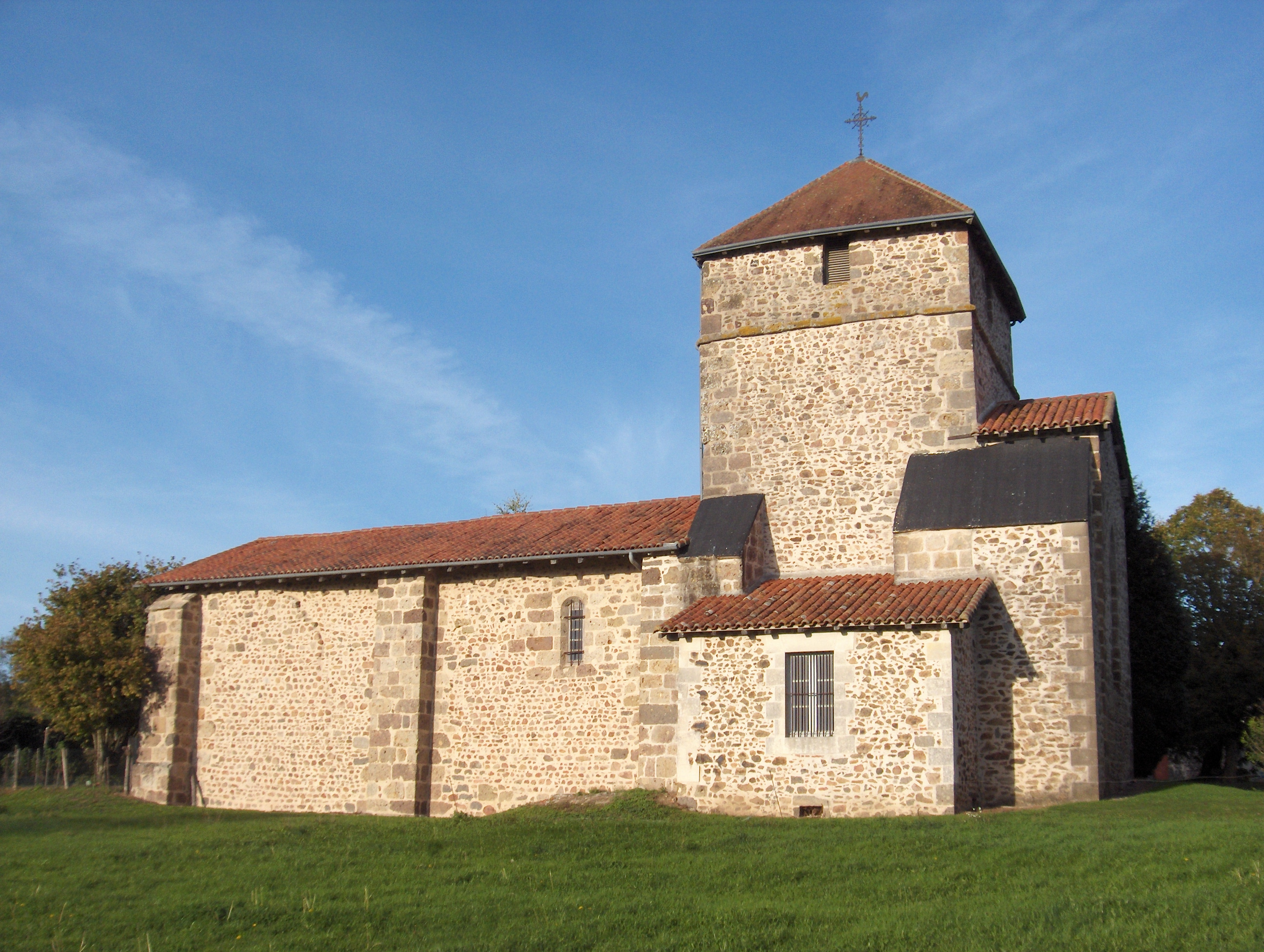
- Saint-Quentin-sur-Charente church
- Location of Saint-Quentin-sur-Charente
- Location within France Location within Nouvelle-Aquitaine
- Coordinates: 45°50′20″N 0°40′16″E
- Country: France
- Region: Nouvelle-Aquitaine
- Department: Charente
- Arrondissement: Confolens
- Canton: Charente-Vienne
- Intercommunality: Charente Limousine

Government
  - Mayor (2020–2026): Mickaël Loiseau
- Area^{1}: 14.39 km^{2} (5.56 sq mi)
- Elevation: 200 m (660 ft)
- Highest elevation: 263 m (863 ft)
- Lowest elevation: 169 m (554 ft)
- Population (2023): 199
  - Density: 13.8/km^{2} (35.8/sq mi)
- Time zone: UTC+01:00 (CET)
  - Summer (DST): UTC+02:00 (CEST)
- INSEE/Postal code: 16345 /16150
- ^{1} French Land Register data, which excludes lakes, ponds, glaciers > 1 km^{2} (0.386 sq mi or 247 acres) and river estuaries.

Saint-Quentin-sur-Charente (French pronunciation: [sɛ̃ kɑ̃tɛ̃ syʁ ʃaʁɑ̃t]; Limousin: Sent Quentin) is a commune in the Charente department in Nouvelle-Aquitaine, southwestern France.

== Location and access ==
Saint-Quentin-sur-Charente, called Saint-Quentin locally, is part of the canton of Charente-Vienne. It lies on the upper course of the river Charente. The nearest larger towns are Chabanais (6 km (3.7 mi) to the northeast), Rochechouart (12 km (7.5 mi) to the east) and Confolens (20 km (12 mi) to the north). The prefecture Angoulême is 45 km (28 mi) to the southwest. It is served by several small country roads. The D161 and the D190 serve the town. The D164 passes just north of the town. The N 141 (Angoulême–Limoges) passes 4 kilometres (2.5 mi) north of the town. The nearest train station is in Chabanais, served by TER.

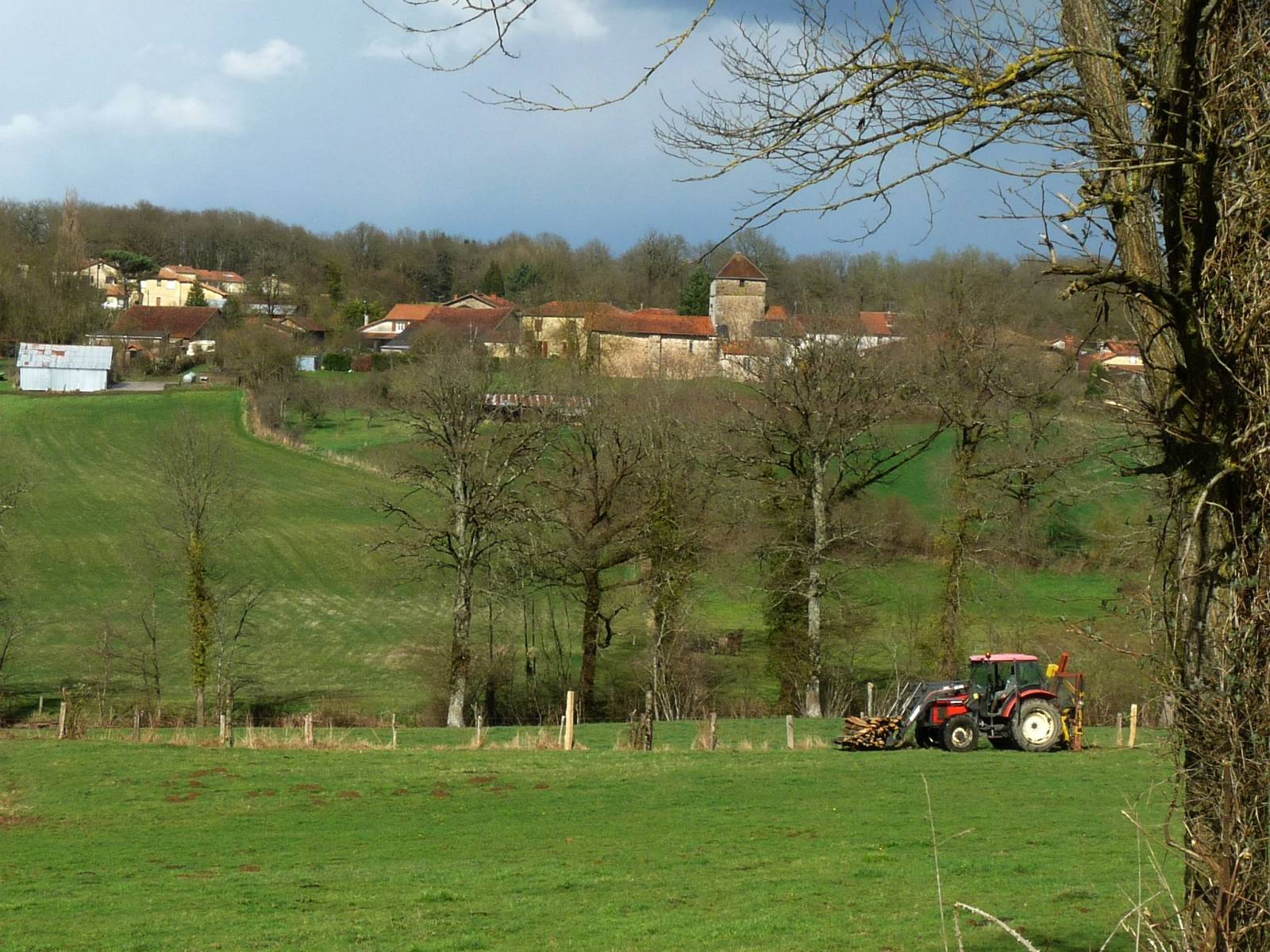
Saint-Quentin-sur-Charente view of the village from the upper course of the Charente River in nearby valley.

== Population ==
Historical population

Year	Pop.	±% p.a.
1793	598	—
1821	615	+0.10%
1846	636	+0.13%
1872	559	−0.50%
1901	497	−0.40%
1926	425	−0.62%
1946	329	−1.27%
1962	347	+0.33%
1968	294	−2.72%

Year	Pop.	±% p.a.
1975	250	−2.29%
1982	245	−0.29%
1990	250	+0.25%
1999	232	−0.83%
2007	225	−0.38%
2012	202	−2.13%
2017	215	+1.26%
2023	199	−1.28%

Source: EHESS and INSEE

== See also ==
- Rochechouart impact structure
- Communes of the Charente department
