= Ansac-sur-Vienne =

- Commune
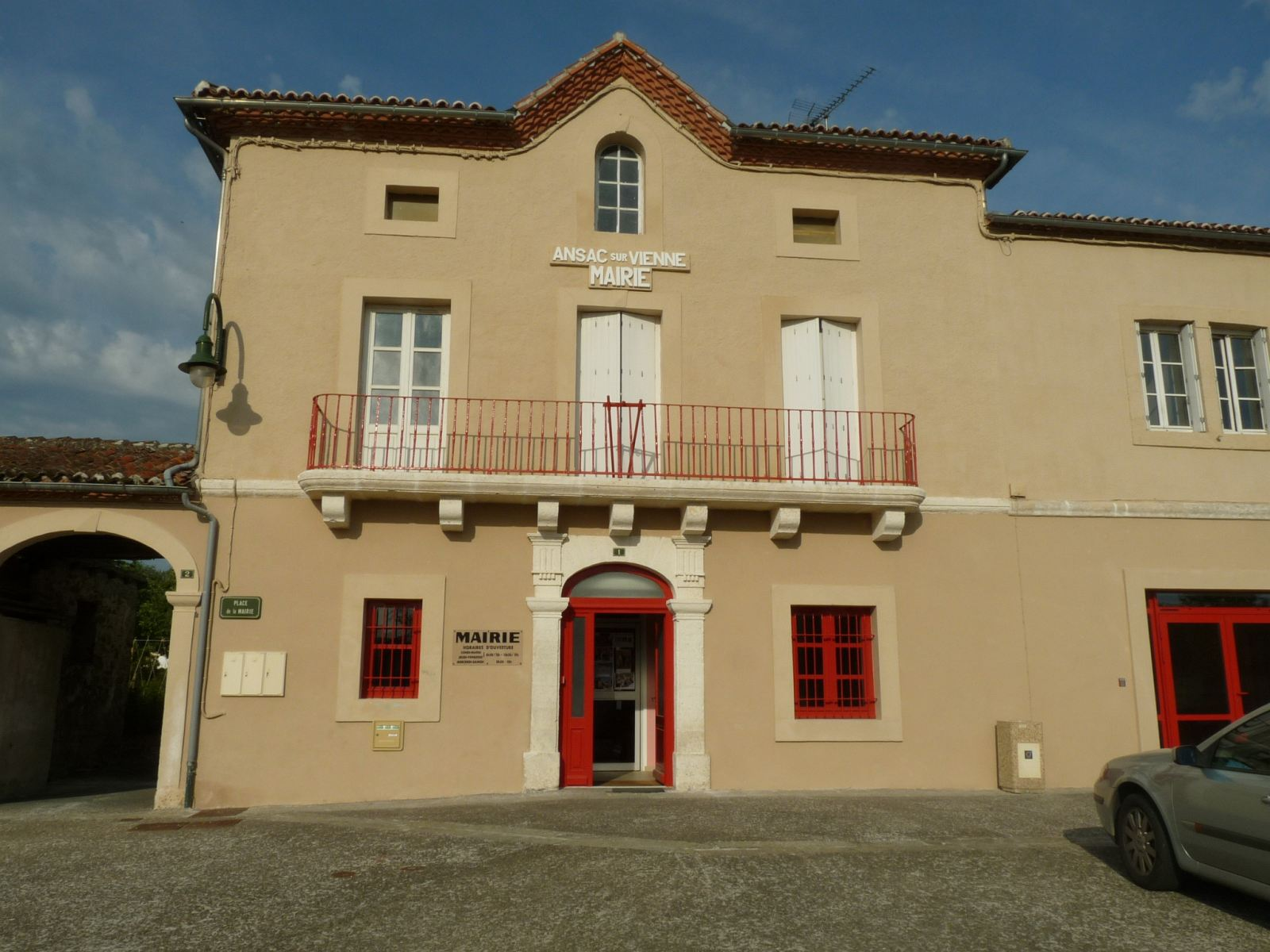
- The town hall in Ansac-sur-Vienne
- Location of Ansac-sur-Vienne
- Location within France Location within Nouvelle-Aquitaine
- Coordinates: 45°59′38″N 0°38′52″E
- Country: France
- Region: Nouvelle-Aquitaine
- Department: Charente
- Arrondissement: Confolens
- Canton: Charente-Vienne

Government
  - Mayor (2020–2026): Fabrice Audoin
- Area^{1}: 30.79 km^{2} (11.89 sq mi)
- Elevation: 110 m (360 ft)
- Highest elevation: 231 m (758 ft)
- Lowest elevation: 130 m (430 ft)
- Population (2023): 815
  - Density: 26.5/km^{2} (68.6/sq mi)
- Time zone: UTC+01:00 (CET)
  - Summer (DST): UTC+02:00 (CEST)
- INSEE/Postal code: 16016 /16500
- ^{1} French Land Register data, which excludes lakes, ponds, glaciers > 1 km^{2} (0.386 sq mi or 247 acres) and river estuaries.

Ansac-sur-Vienne (French pronunciation: [ɑ̃sak syʁ vjɛn], literally Ansac on Vienne; Occitan: Ançac) is a commune in the Charente department in Southwestern France.

== Population ==
Historical population
Year	Pop.	±% p.a.
1968	738	—
1975	752	+0.27%
1982	854	+1.83%
1990	936	+1.15%
1999	852	−1.04%
2007	815	−0.55%
2012	839	+0.58%
2017	829	−0.24%
2023	815	−0.28%
Source: INSEE

== See also ==
- Communes of the Charente department
