= Pleuville =

- Commune
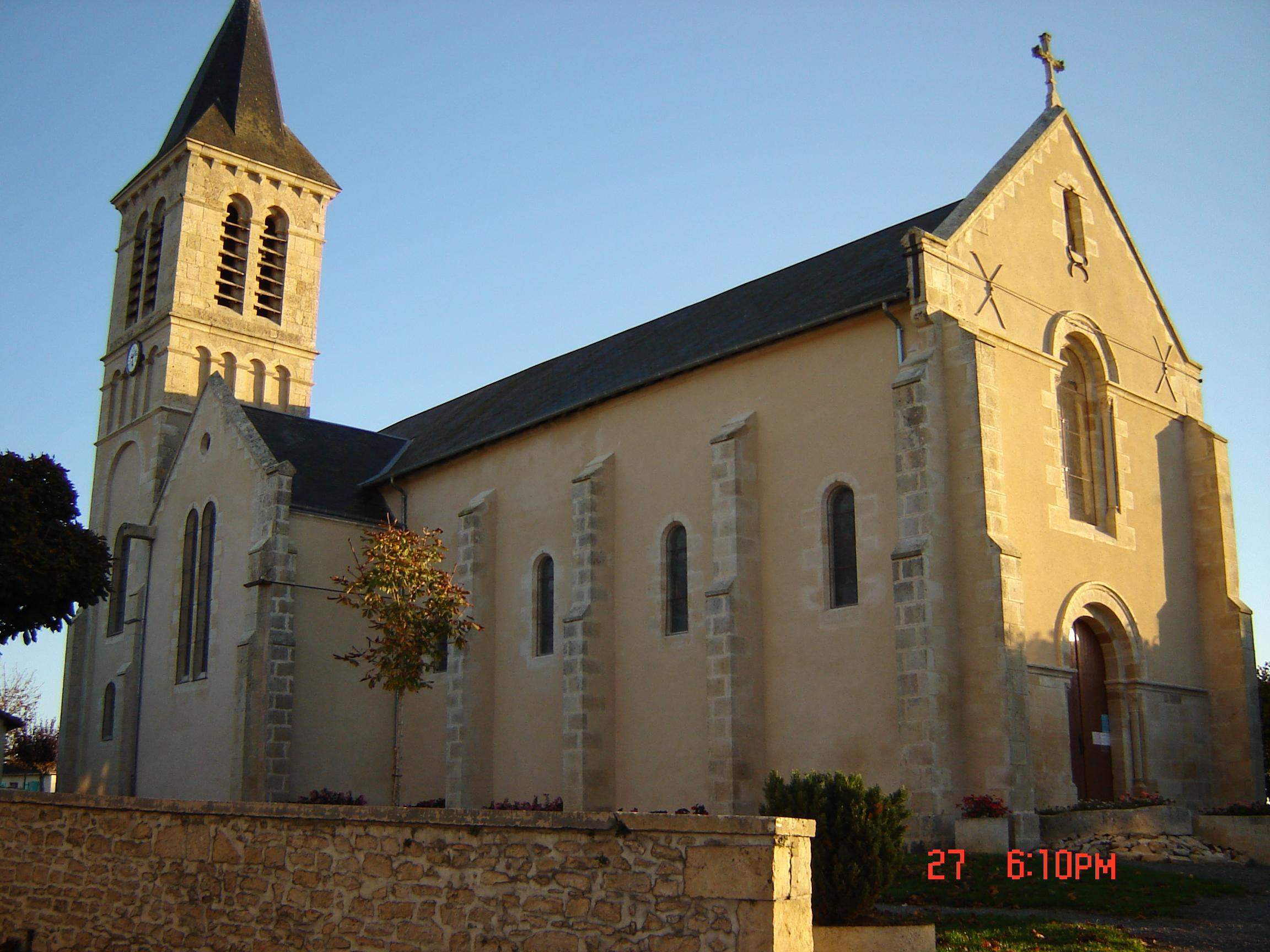
- The church in Pleuville
- Location of Pleuville
- Location within France Location within Nouvelle-Aquitaine
- Coordinates: 46°05′28″N 0°29′48″E
- Country: France
- Region: Nouvelle-Aquitaine
- Department: Charente
- Arrondissement: Confolens
- Canton: Charente-Vienne

Government
  - Mayor (2021–2026): Jean-François Jantet
- Area^{1}: 33.63 km^{2} (12.98 sq mi)
- Elevation: 175 m (574 ft)
- Highest elevation: 187 m (614 ft)
- Lowest elevation: 130 m (430 ft)
- Population (2023): 313
  - Density: 9.31/km^{2} (24.1/sq mi)
- Time zone: UTC+01:00 (CET)
  - Summer (DST): UTC+02:00 (CEST)
- INSEE/Postal code: 16264 /16490
- ^{1} French Land Register data, which excludes lakes, ponds, glaciers > 1 km^{2} (0.386 sq mi or 247 acres) and river estuaries.

Pleuville (French pronunciation: [pløvil]) is a commune in the Charente department in southwestern France.

== Population ==
Historical population
Year	Pop.	±% p.a.
1968	606	—
1975	534	−1.79%
1982	511	−0.63%
1990	454	−1.47%
1999	364	−2.43%
2007	354	−0.35%
2012	386	+1.75%
2017	342	−2.39%
2023	313	−1.47%
Source: INSEE

== Landmarks ==
The village includes the Château de Pleuville and the Château de Gorce.

== See also ==
- Communes of the Charente department
