= Michel Boutant =

French politician

Mayor of Chabanais
- Incumbent
- Assumed office 12 October 2020
- Preceded by: Claude Baron

Personal details
- Born: 23 November 1956 (age 69) Chabanais, France
- Party: PS

Michel Boutant (born 23 November 1956) is a French politician. A member of the Socialist Party, he has served as Mayor of Chabanais since 2020. From 2008 to 2020, Boutant was a member of the Senate of France, representing the Charente department.
