= Montrollet =

- Commune
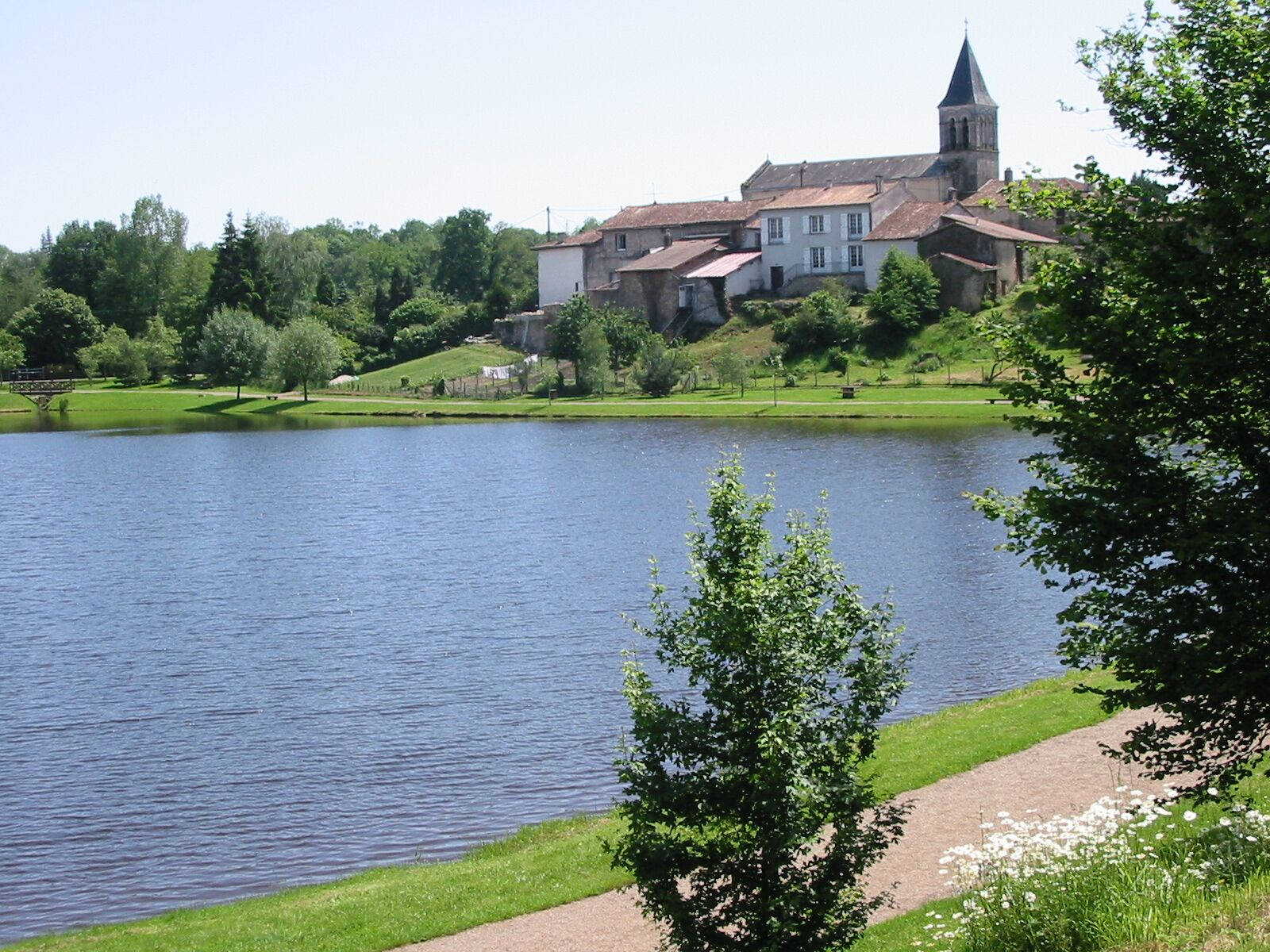
- The lake in Montrollet
- Location of Montrollet
- Location within France Location within Nouvelle-Aquitaine
- Coordinates: 45°59′01″N 0°53′51″E
- Country: France
- Region: Nouvelle-Aquitaine
- Department: Charente
- Arrondissement: Confolens
- Canton: Charente-Vienne

Government
  - Mayor (2020–2026): Benoît Savy
- Area^{1}: 22.22 km^{2} (8.58 sq mi)
- Elevation: 366 m (1,201 ft)
- Highest elevation: 366 m (1,201 ft)
- Lowest elevation: 225 m (738 ft)
- Population (2023): 323
  - Density: 14.5/km^{2} (37.6/sq mi)
- Time zone: UTC+01:00 (CET)
  - Summer (DST): UTC+02:00 (CEST)
- INSEE/Postal code: 16231 /16420
- ^{1} French Land Register data, which excludes lakes, ponds, glaciers > 1 km^{2} (0.386 sq mi or 247 acres) and river estuaries.

Montrollet (French pronunciation: [mɔ̃tʁɔlɛ]; Occitan: Monteirolet) is a commune in the Charente department in southwestern France.

== Population ==
Historical population
Year	Pop.	±% p.a.
1968	406	—
1975	343	−2.38%
1982	296	−2.08%
1990	265	−1.37%
1999	269	+0.17%
2007	291	+0.99%
2012	303	+0.81%
2017	312	+0.59%
2023	323	+0.58%
Source: INSEE

== See also ==
- Communes of the Charente department
