= Hiesse =

- Commune
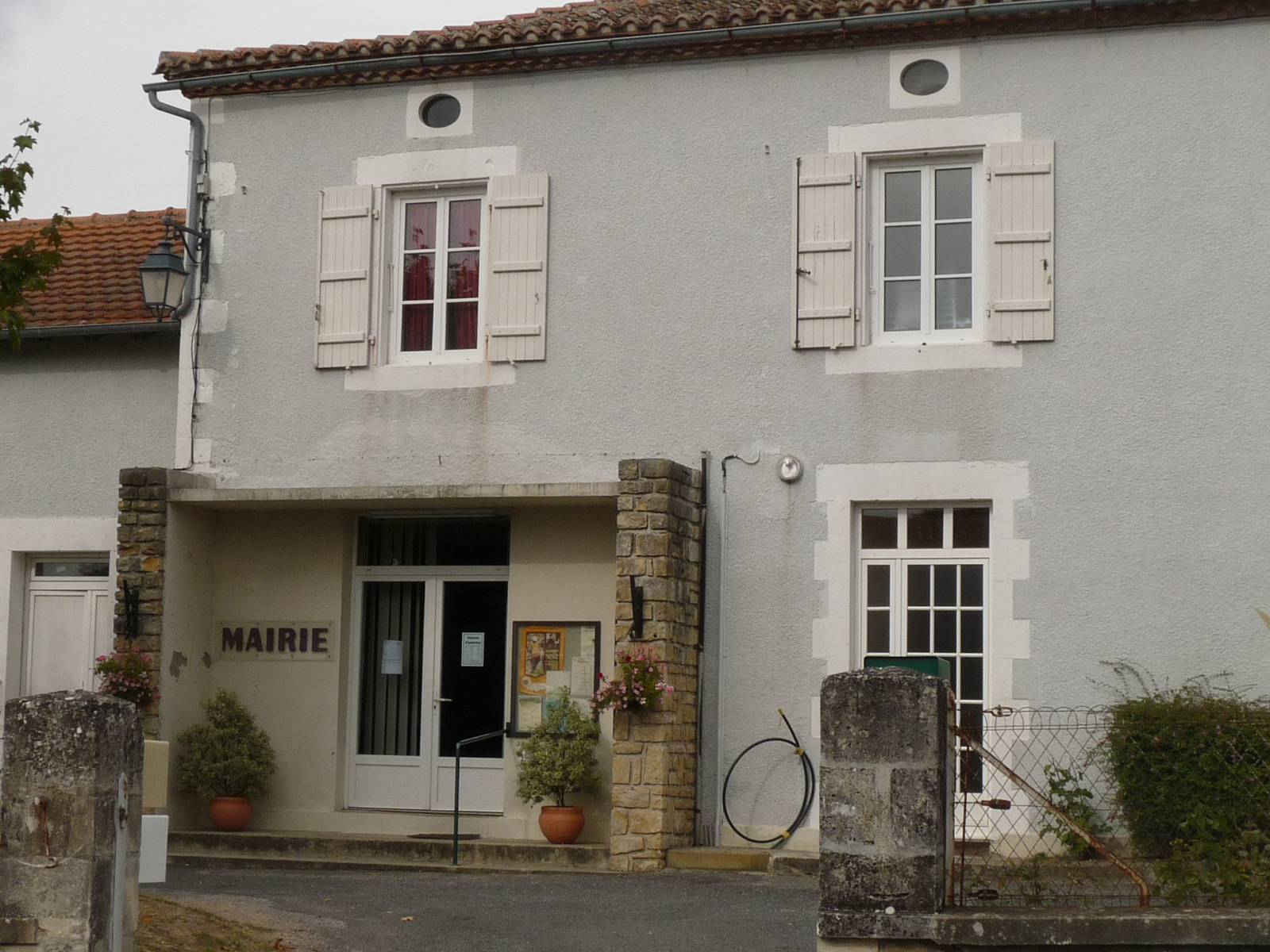
- Town hall
- Location of Hiesse
- Location within France Location within Nouvelle-Aquitaine
- Coordinates: 46°03′25″N 0°35′33″E
- Country: France
- Region: Nouvelle-Aquitaine
- Department: Charente
- Arrondissement: Confolens
- Canton: Charente-Vienne
- Intercommunality: Charente Limousine

Government
  - Mayor (2020–2026): Yvonne Mesrine
- Area^{1}: 24.75 km^{2} (9.56 sq mi)
- Elevation: 180 m (590 ft)
- Highest elevation: 231 m (758 ft)
- Lowest elevation: 157 m (515 ft)
- Population (2023): 238
  - Density: 9.62/km^{2} (24.9/sq mi)
- Time zone: UTC+01:00 (CET)
  - Summer (DST): UTC+02:00 (CEST)
- INSEE/Postal code: 16164 /16490
- ^{1} French Land Register data, which excludes lakes, ponds, glaciers > 1 km^{2} (0.386 sq mi or 247 acres) and river estuaries.

Hiesse (French pronunciation: [jɛs]; Occitan: Iessa) is a commune in the Charente department in southwestern France.

== Population ==
Historical population
Year	Pop.	±% p.a.
1968	422	—
1975	383	−1.38%
1982	342	−1.60%
1990	295	−1.83%
1999	277	−0.70%
2007	251	−1.22%
2012	241	−0.81%
2017	243	+0.17%
2023	238	−0.35%
Source: INSEE

== See also ==
- Communes of the Charente department
