= Château de Pleuville =

Rural chateau in Nouvelle-Aquitaine, France

Coordinates: 46.0909°N 0.4964°E

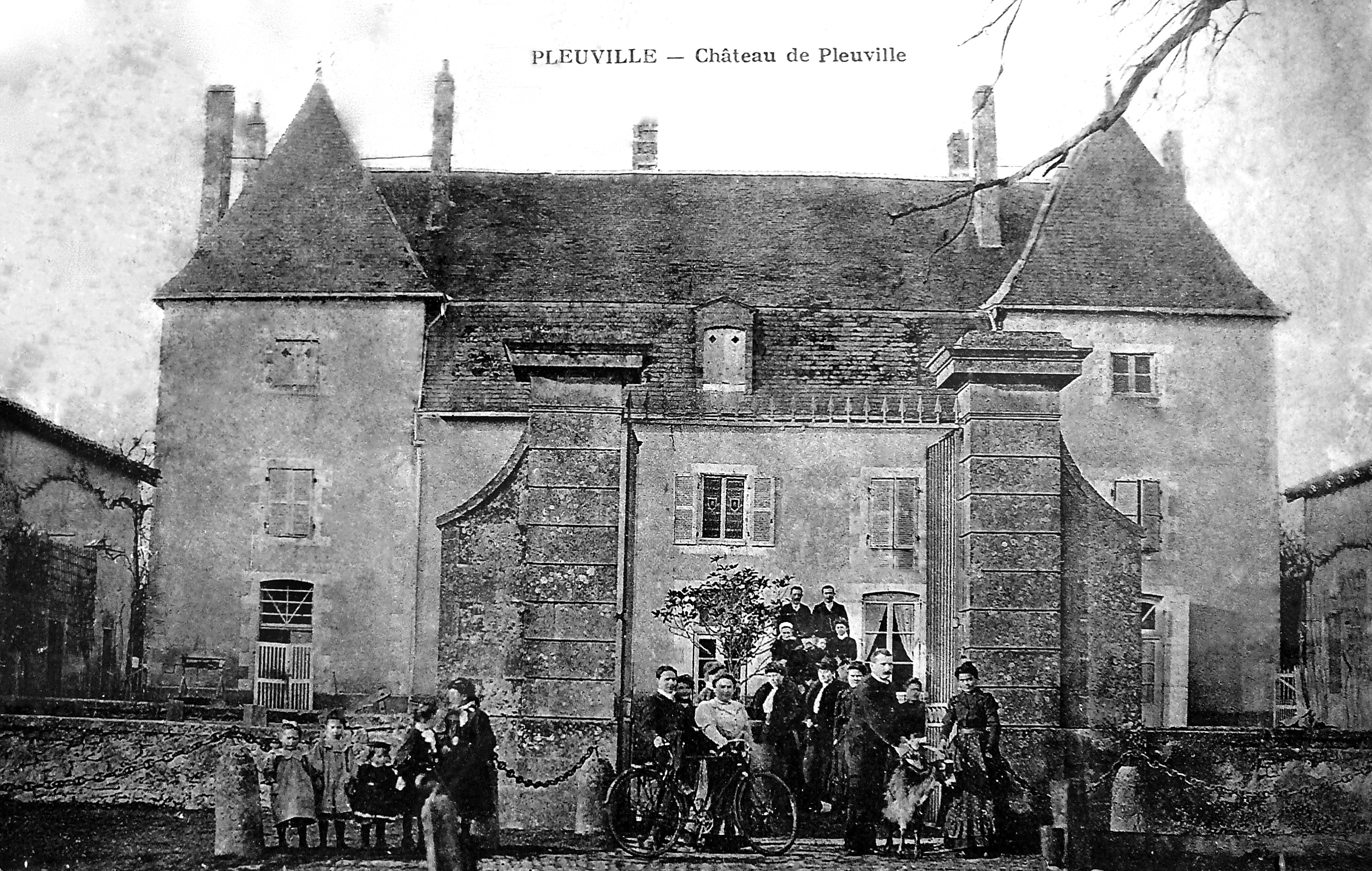
Château de Pleuville c.1905, from a postcard posted in 1908

The Château de Pleuville, in the village of Pleuville located in the north of the Charente département, is a rural château typical of the region. It was rebuilt by the Favre d'Echallens family in the 1860s, and survives unaltered, with a complete set of communs (multi-purpose outbuildings).

== Origin and design ==
In the late 18th century the land on which the Château de Pleuville was built belonged to the Duverrier de Boulzat family, based at Château de Gorce, about two kilometres south of Pleuville village.

Following the French Revolution, Pierre-Jacques Duverrier succeeded in retaining the family's existing properties and in acquiring other abandoned or forfeited estates. He also became mayor of the new commune of Pleuville, retaining this position until his death in 1829. One of his children, Antoine, inherited the Pleuville properties.

On the 1825 plan cadastrale there is a long rectangular building near the village centre where the Château de Pleuville now stands, and this was almost certainly adapted and raised in height to form the present structure. The roof and north-west front were newly constructed, in a style closely based on that of Château de Sommières (1673–1687, attributed to Louis XIV's architect J. Hardouin-Mansart), about 30 kilometres north of Pleuville. The present three large granges (multi-purpose barns), the main gateway, and the moat are not present on the 1825 map and were also newly built. The age of the earlier long building is not known. Although of relatively recent date, the reconstruction was carried out in limestone and oak, using long-standing traditional methods. There are no typical 19th century embellishments on the exterior, which is stylistically indistinguishable from similar buildings of c. 1750.

In about 1830 Antoine Duverrier's daughter Marie-Emma-Séraphine (1810–1886) married Jean-Joseph Favre d'Echallens (1801–1886). They acquired the chateau buildings and land, but do not appear with their household as Pleuville residents until the 1872 census. A reconstruction date of about 1865 therefore seems likely. Jean was mayor of Pleuville for a time; and Séraphine's grave in Pleuville cemetery is inscribed “décédée en son château de Pleuville le 14 Mai 1886”. Members of the Favre family continued to be buried at Pleuville cemetery until the 1930s, but at some point the chateau was sold and it has had a number of owners and occupants since.

== The Communs ==
The rebuilt chateau was provided with three extensive granges, placed at right angles to the south-east front of the house to create two new courtyards. Facilities included a large bakery with large and small ovens; the village jail; a coach house with farrier's forge, stables, tack room and coachman's lodge; a large cart shed; various areas for animals including a range of cow stalls; extensive storage areas; and a six-seat latrine. Thus equipped, the chateau with its park and farm would have been self-sufficient. The ensemble remains largely unaltered today.

== World War II ==
The chateau has a significant connection with maréchal Jean de Lattre de Tassigny (1889-1952), who played a major role in 20th century French history as one of the four supreme allied commanders in the closing stages of the war. He was named after his great-grandfather Jean-Joseph Favre, and his grandmother Marie-Gabrielle (daughter of Jean-Joseph and Seraphine Favre who married Gaston de Lattre at Pleuville in 1854). General de Lattre was born at Mouilleron-en-Pareds in Vendée, lived much of his early life in Poitiers and stayed at Château de Pleuville in his youth.

In 1939, people from eastern parts of France were evacuated to the Charente prior to the German invasion, and numerous families from Kalhausen in Moselle were accommodated in the Chateau, which was otherwise virtually unoccupied at the time. The armistice with Germany was signed in June 1940, and the evacuees returned home in August. Under the terms of the armistice France was divided between the zone libre and zone occupée, The boundary between the two zones ran through Pleuville commune and a checkpoint was set up outside its cemetery. Later in the war there was strong local support for the resistance, and the chateau was used to store equipment and weapons; but it escaped damage when Pleuville was raided and set alight by a German unit in 1944.
