= Saint-Maurice-des-Lions =

- Commune
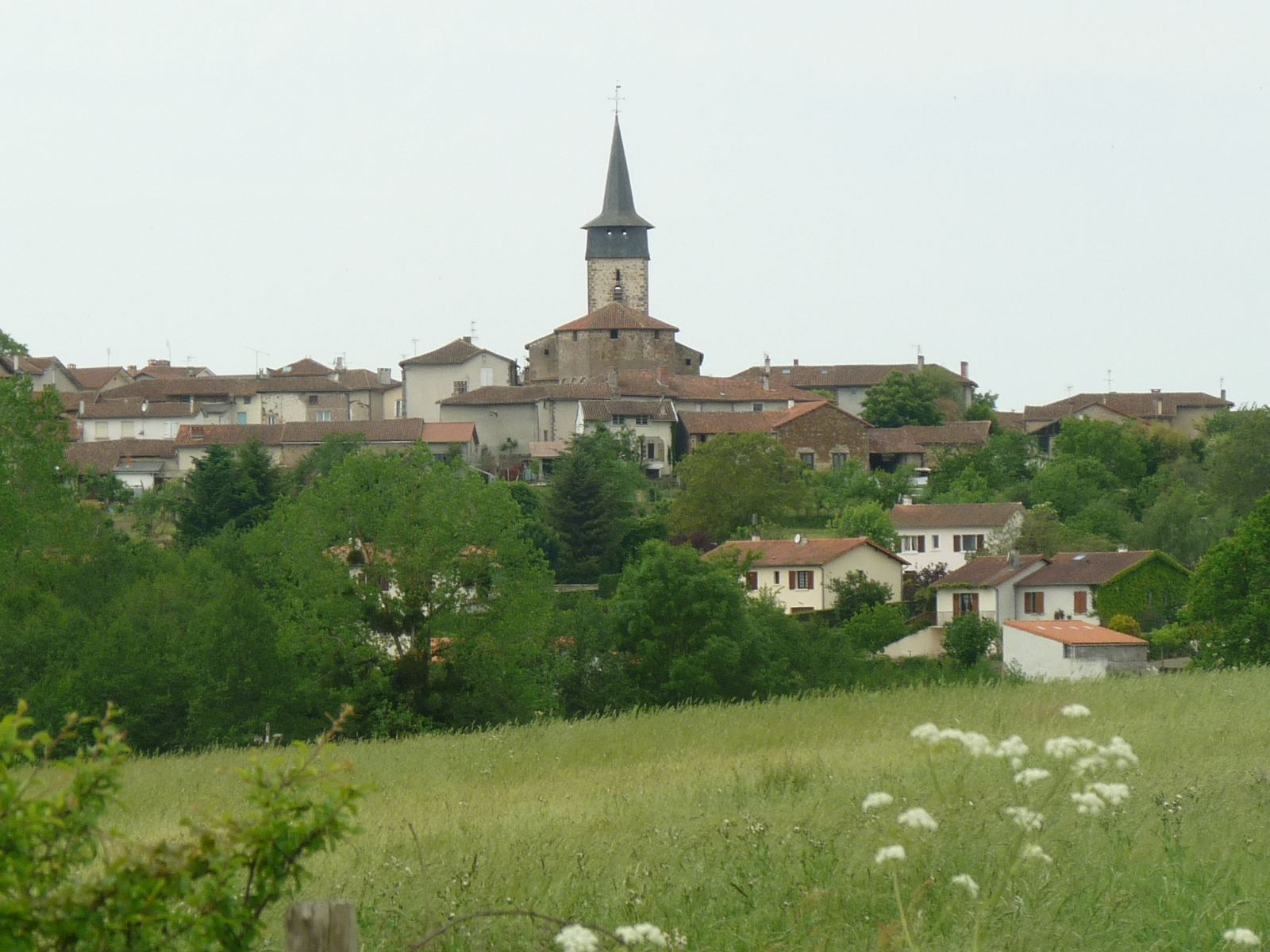
- A general view of Saint-Maurice-des-Lions
- Location of Saint-Maurice-des-Lions
- Location within France Location within Nouvelle-Aquitaine
- Coordinates: 45°57′57″N 0°42′10″E
- Country: France
- Region: Nouvelle-Aquitaine
- Department: Charente
- Arrondissement: Confolens
- Canton: Charente-Vienne
- Intercommunality: Charente Limousine

Government
  - Mayor (2020–2026): David Chevalier
- Area^{1}: 50.08 km^{2} (19.34 sq mi)
- Elevation: 160 m (520 ft)
- Highest elevation: 245 m (804 ft)
- Lowest elevation: 132 m (433 ft)
- Population (2023): 892
  - Density: 17.8/km^{2} (46.1/sq mi)
- Time zone: UTC+01:00 (CET)
  - Summer (DST): UTC+02:00 (CEST)
- INSEE/Postal code: 16337 /16500
- ^{1} French Land Register data, which excludes lakes, ponds, glaciers > 1 km^{2} (0.386 sq mi or 247 acres) and river estuaries.

Saint-Maurice-des-Lions (French pronunciation: [sɛ̃ mɔʁis de ljɔ̃]) is a commune in the Charente department in southwestern France.

== Population ==
Historical population
Year	Pop.	±% p.a.
1968	1,118	—
1975	1,011	−1.43%
1982	933	−1.14%
1990	1,017	+1.08%
1999	932	−0.97%
2007	960	+0.37%
2012	959	−0.02%
2017	881	−1.68%
2023	892	+0.21%
Source: INSEE

== See also ==
- Communes of the Charente department
