= Saint-Christophe, Charente =

Saint-Christophe
- Commune
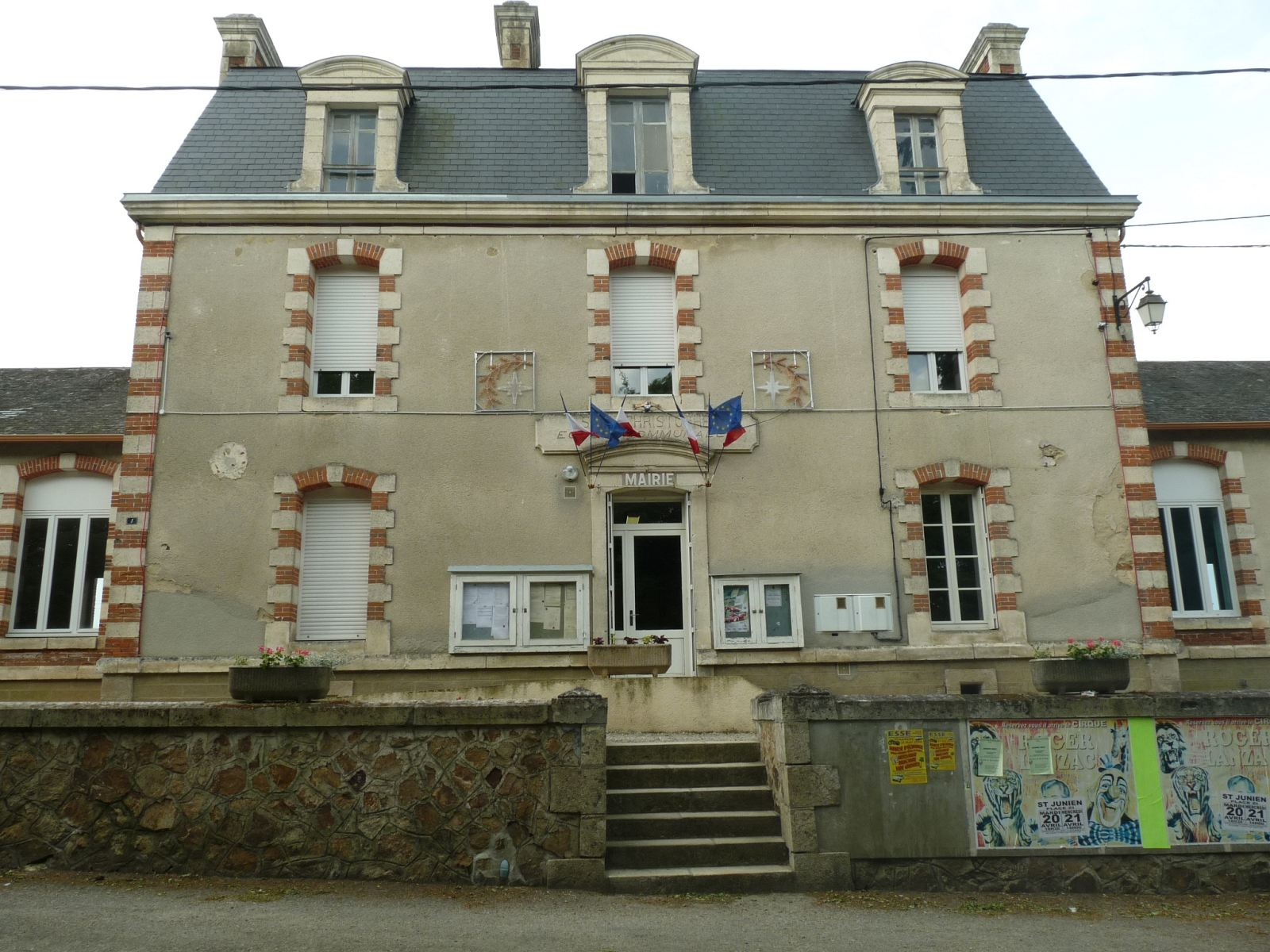
- Town hall
- Location of Saint-Christophe
- Location within France Location within Nouvelle-Aquitaine
- Coordinates: 46°00′13″N 0°51′03″E
- Country: France
- Region: Nouvelle-Aquitaine
- Department: Charente
- Arrondissement: Confolens
- Canton: Charente-Vienne
- Intercommunality: Charente Limousine

Government
  - Mayor (2020–2026): Patrick Rousseau
- Area^{1}: 23.65 km^{2} (9.13 sq mi)
- Elevation: 279 m (915 ft)
- Highest elevation: 340 m (1,120 ft)
- Lowest elevation: 199 m (653 ft)
- Population (2023): 334
  - Density: 14.1/km^{2} (36.6/sq mi)
- Time zone: UTC+01:00 (CET)
  - Summer (DST): UTC+02:00 (CEST)
- INSEE/Postal code: 16306 /16420
- ^{1} French Land Register data, which excludes lakes, ponds, glaciers > 1 km^{2} (0.386 sq mi or 247 acres) and river estuaries.

Saint-Christophe (French pronunciation: [sɛ̃ kʁistɔf]; Occitan: Sent Crestòfa) is a commune in the Charente department in southwestern France. It is a member of the Charente Limousine group of communes, bordering Haute-Vienne. It is located 14 km (8.7 mi) from Confolens and 67 km (42 mi) northeast of Angoulême.

The village is also 5 km (3.1 mi) east of Lesterps, 13 km (8.1 mi) north of Saint-Junien, 18 km (11 mi) north-east of Chabanais, 21 km (13 mi) south-west of Bellac and 37 km (23 mi) north- west of Limoges.

The main road in the commune is the D 82 route from Confolens and Lesterps to Limoges via Oradour-sur-Glane, which crosses it from west to east. The village is also served by the D 163 which goes south-west to Chabanais, and the D 330 south to Brigueuil and Saint-Junien.

The nearest station is in Saint-Junien, served by TER buses to Saillat and Limoges.

== Population ==
Historical population
Year	Pop.	±% p.a.
1968	480	—
1975	414	−2.09%
1982	381	−1.18%
1990	339	−1.45%
1999	315	−0.81%
2007	320	+0.20%
2012	342	+1.34%
2017	332	−0.59%
2023	334	+0.10%
Source: INSEE

== See also ==
- Communes of the Charente department
