= Exideuil-sur-Vienne =

- Commune
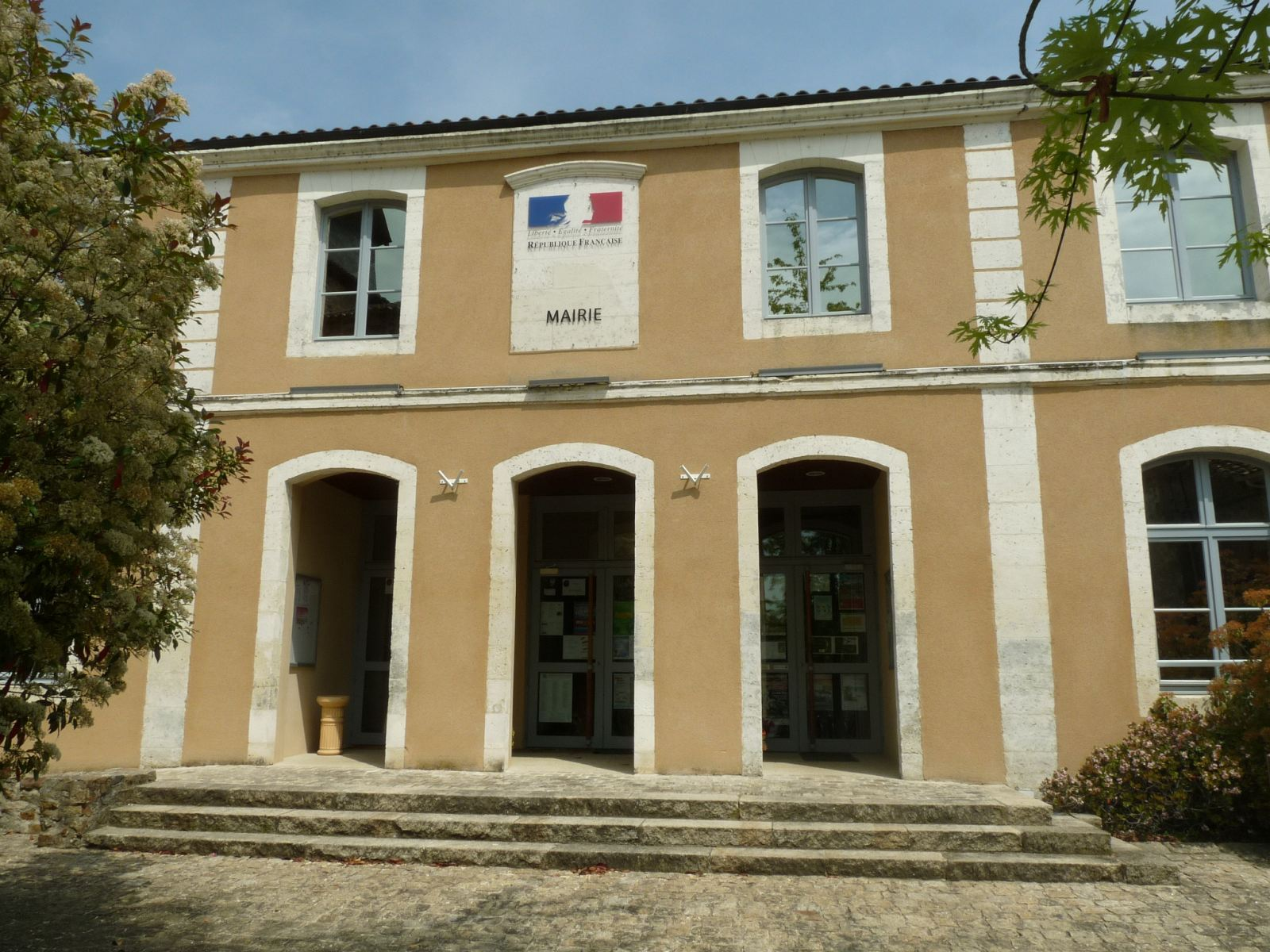
- Town hall
- Location of Exideuil-sur-Vienne
- Location within France Location within Nouvelle-Aquitaine
- Coordinates: 45°53′13″N 0°40′28″E
- Country: France
- Region: Nouvelle-Aquitaine
- Department: Charente
- Arrondissement: Confolens
- Canton: Charente-Vienne
- Intercommunality: Charente Limousine

Government
  - Mayor (2020–2026): Jean-François Duvergne
- Area^{1}: 20.56 km^{2} (7.94 sq mi)
- Highest elevation: 243 m (797 ft)
- Lowest elevation: 140 m (460 ft)
- Population (2023): 1,035
  - Density: 50.34/km^{2} (130.4/sq mi)
- Time zone: UTC+01:00 (CET)
  - Summer (DST): UTC+02:00 (CEST)
- INSEE/Postal code: 16134 /16150
- ^{1} French Land Register data, which excludes lakes, ponds, glaciers > 1 km^{2} (0.386 sq mi or 247 acres) and river estuaries.

Exideuil-sur-Vienne (French pronunciation: [ɛksidœj syʁ vjɛn]; before 2018: Exideuil) is a commune in the Charente department in southwestern France.

== Population ==
Historical population
Year	Pop.	±% p.a.
1968	1,135	—
1975	1,212	+0.94%
1982	1,115	−1.18%
1990	1,039	−0.88%
1999	1,019	−0.22%
2007	1,053	+0.41%
2012	1,051	−0.04%
2017	1,014	−0.71%
2023	1,035	+0.34%
Source: INSEE

== See also ==
- Communes of the Charente department
