= Brillac =

- Commune
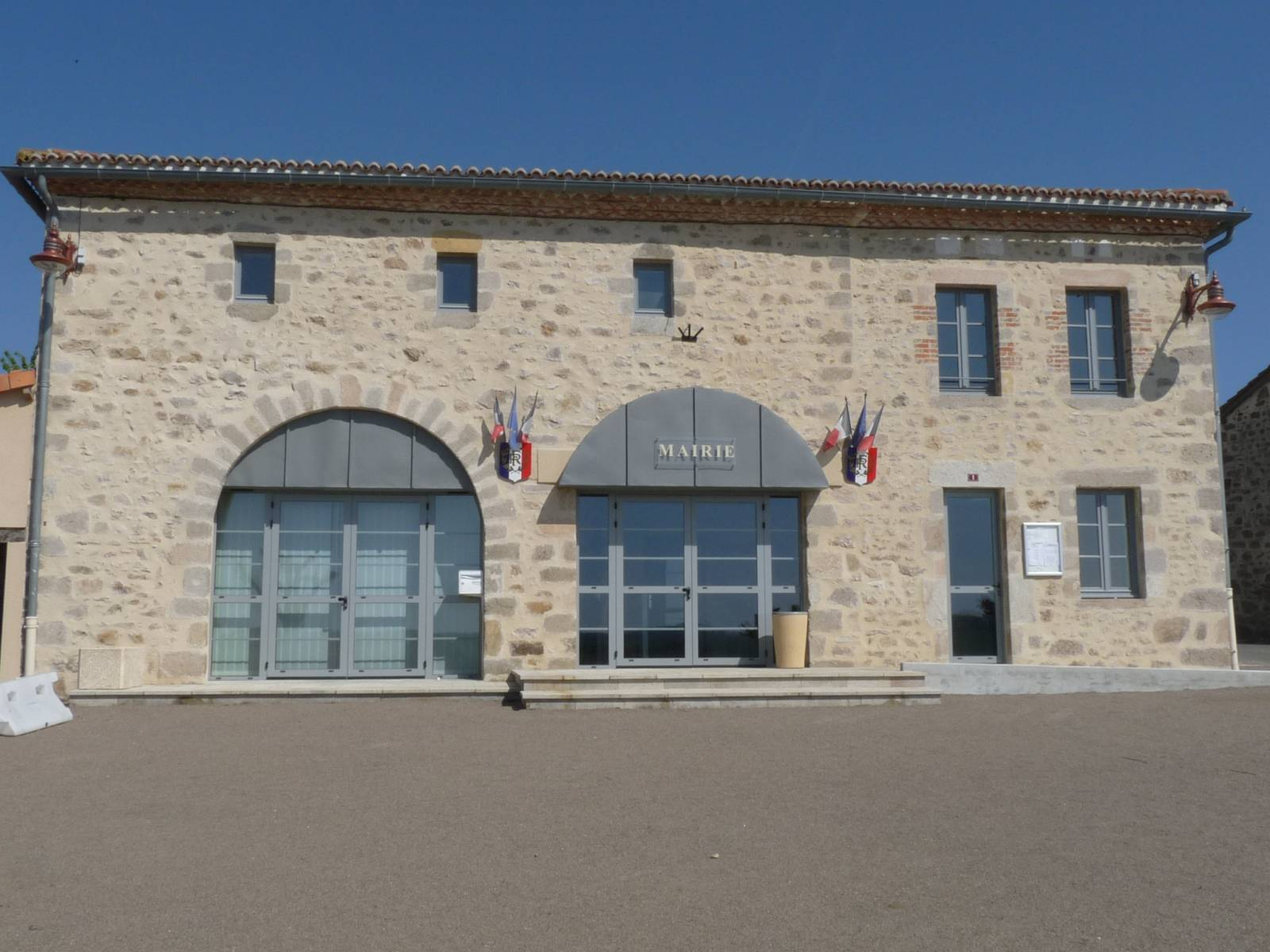
- Town hall
- Location of Brillac
- Location within France Location within Nouvelle-Aquitaine
- Coordinates: 46°03′41″N 0°46′42″E
- Country: France
- Region: Nouvelle-Aquitaine
- Department: Charente
- Arrondissement: Confolens
- Canton: Charente-Vienne

Government
  - Mayor (2020–2026): Jacky Martineau
- Area^{1}: 42.41 km^{2} (16.37 sq mi)
- Elevation: 220 m (720 ft)
- Highest elevation: 246 m (807 ft)
- Lowest elevation: 143 m (469 ft)
- Population (2023): 591
  - Density: 13.9/km^{2} (36.1/sq mi)
- Time zone: UTC+01:00 (CET)
  - Summer (DST): UTC+02:00 (CEST)
- INSEE/Postal code: 16065 /16500
- ^{1} French Land Register data, which excludes lakes, ponds, glaciers > 1 km^{2} (0.386 sq mi or 247 acres) and river estuaries.

Brillac (French pronunciation: [bʁijak]; Occitan: Brilhac) is a commune in the Charente department in southwestern France.

== Population ==
Historical population
Year	Pop.	±% p.a.
1968	881	—
1975	786	−1.62%
1982	679	−2.07%
1990	613	−1.27%
1999	664	+0.89%
2007	638	−0.50%
2012	659	+0.65%
2017	639	−0.61%
2023	591	−1.29%
Source: INSEE

== See also ==
- Communes of the Charente department
