= Chabrac =

- Commune
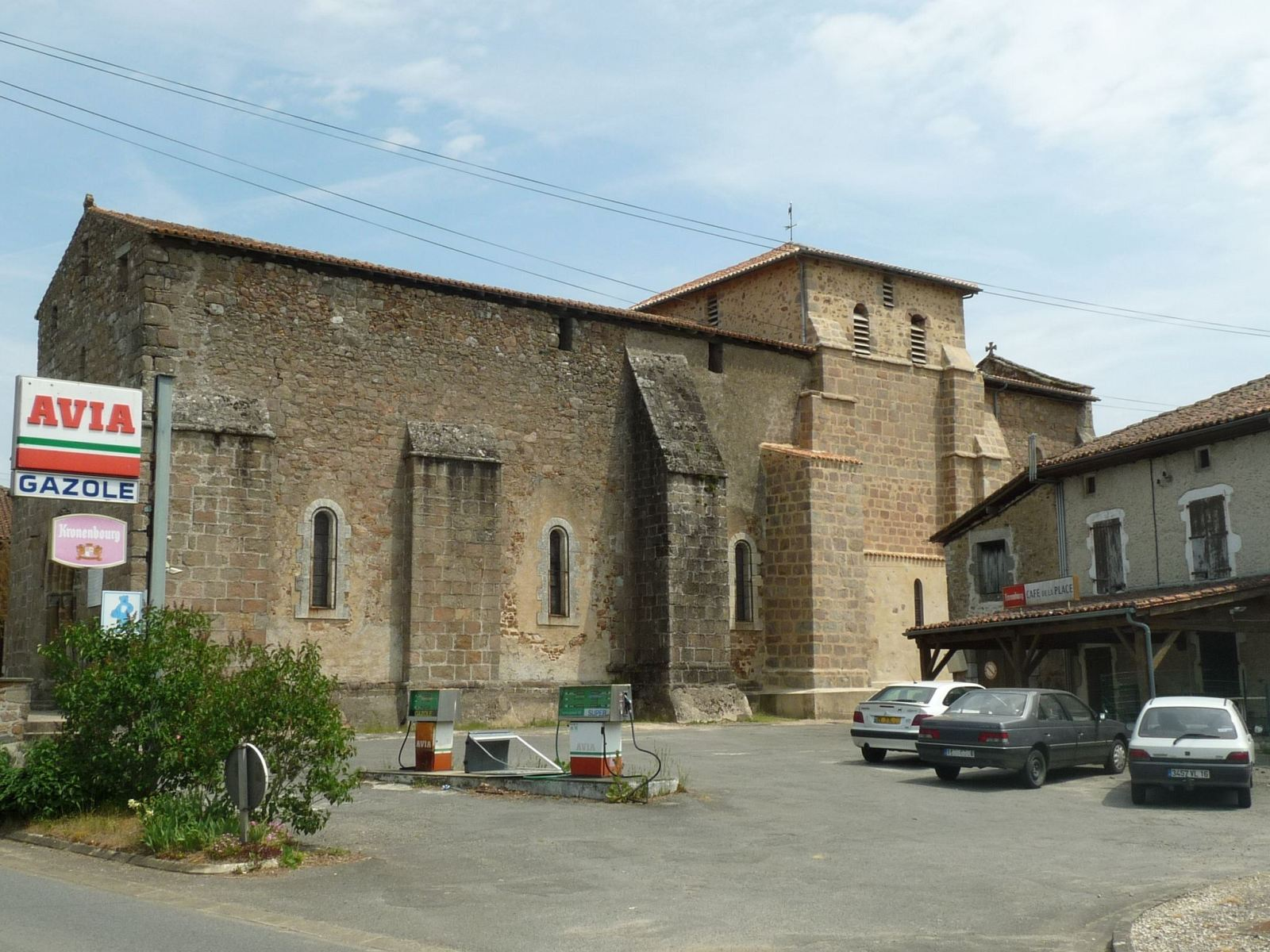
- The church in Chabrac
- Location of Chabrac
- Location within France Location within Nouvelle-Aquitaine
- Coordinates: 45°56′01″N 0°44′22″E
- Country: France
- Region: Nouvelle-Aquitaine
- Department: Charente
- Arrondissement: Confolens
- Canton: Charente-Vienne
- Intercommunality: Charente Limousine

Government
  - Mayor (2020–2026): Jeanine Durepaire
- Area^{1}: 22.40 km^{2} (8.65 sq mi)
- Elevation: 270 m (890 ft)
- Highest elevation: 273 m (896 ft)
- Lowest elevation: 168 m (551 ft)
- Population (2023): 603
  - Density: 26.9/km^{2} (69.7/sq mi)
- Time zone: UTC+01:00 (CET)
  - Summer (DST): UTC+02:00 (CEST)
- INSEE/Postal code: 16071 /16150
- ^{1} French Land Register data, which excludes lakes, ponds, glaciers > 1 km^{2} (0.386 sq mi or 247 acres) and river estuaries.

Chabrac (French pronunciation: [ʃabʁak]) is a commune in the Charente department in southwestern France.

== Population ==
Historical population
Year	Pop.	±% p.a.
1968	548	—
1975	434	−3.28%
1982	489	+1.72%
1990	494	+0.13%
1999	464	−0.69%
2007	498	+0.89%
2012	565	+2.56%
2017	570	+0.18%
2023	603	+0.94%
Source: INSEE

== See also ==
- Communes of the Charente department
