= Chirac, Charente =

Chirac
- Commune
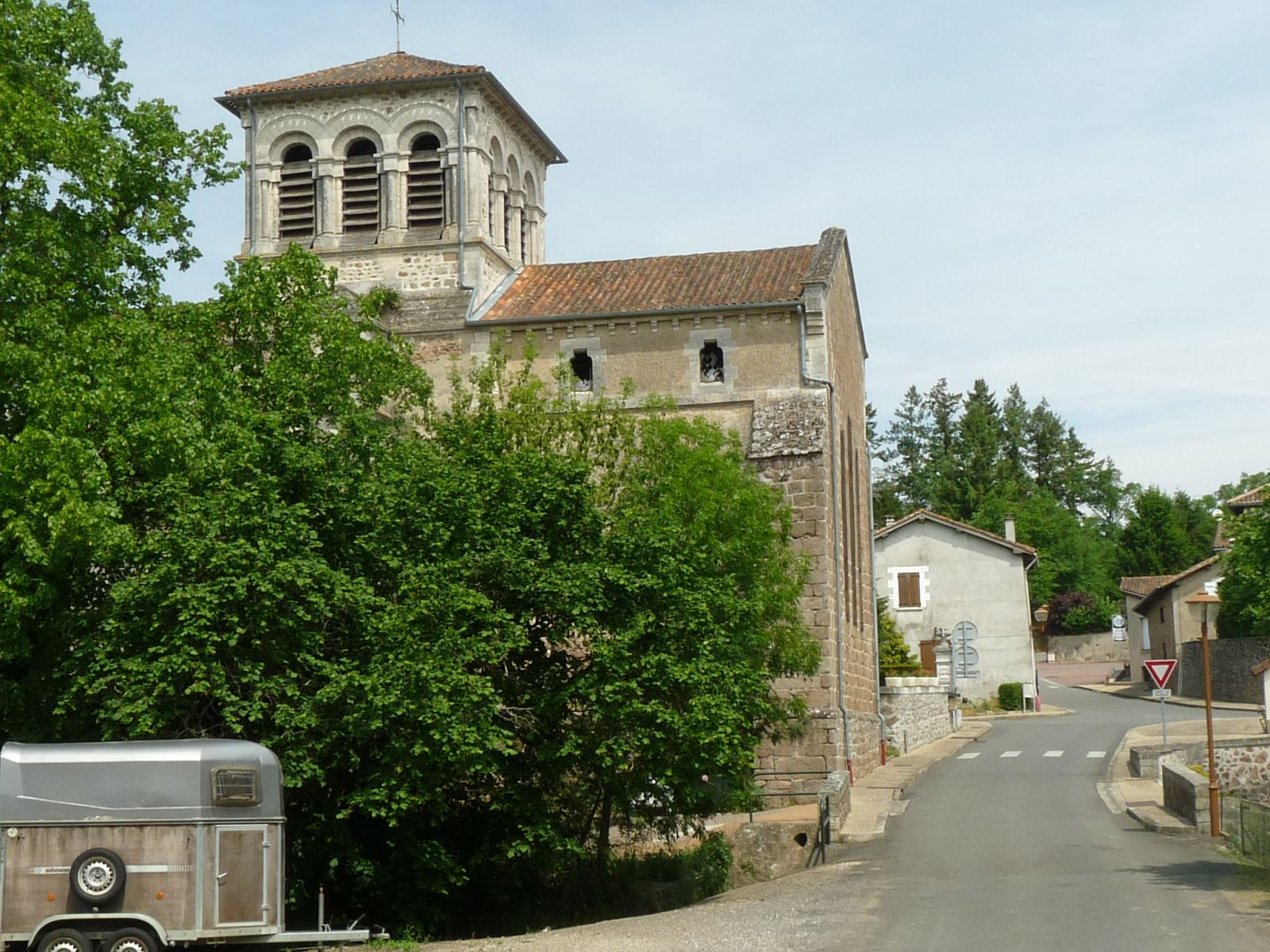
- The church in Chirac
- Location of Chirac
- Location within France Location within Nouvelle-Aquitaine
- Coordinates: 45°54′53″N 0°39′21″E
- Country: France
- Region: Nouvelle-Aquitaine
- Department: Charente
- Arrondissement: Confolens
- Canton: Charente-Vienne
- Intercommunality: Charente Limousine

Government
  - Mayor (2020–2026): Virginie Lebraud
- Area^{1}: 34.33 km^{2} (13.25 sq mi)
- Elevation: 336 m (1,102 ft)
- Highest elevation: 263 m (863 ft)
- Lowest elevation: 133 m (436 ft)
- Population (2023): 781
  - Density: 22.7/km^{2} (58.9/sq mi)
- Time zone: UTC+01:00 (CET)
  - Summer (DST): UTC+02:00 (CEST)
- INSEE/Postal code: 16100 /16150
- ^{1} French Land Register data, which excludes lakes, ponds, glaciers > 1 km^{2} (0.386 sq mi or 247 acres) and river estuaries.

Chirac (French pronunciation: [ʃiʁak]) is a commune in the Charente department in southwestern France.

== Population ==
Historical population
Year	Pop.	±% p.a.
1968	697	—
1975	692	−0.10%
1982	730	+0.77%
1990	767	+0.62%
1999	732	−0.52%
2007	690	−0.74%
2012	756	+1.84%
2017	751	−0.13%
2023	781	+0.65%
Source: INSEE

== See also ==
- Communes of the Charente department
