= Pressignac =

- Commune
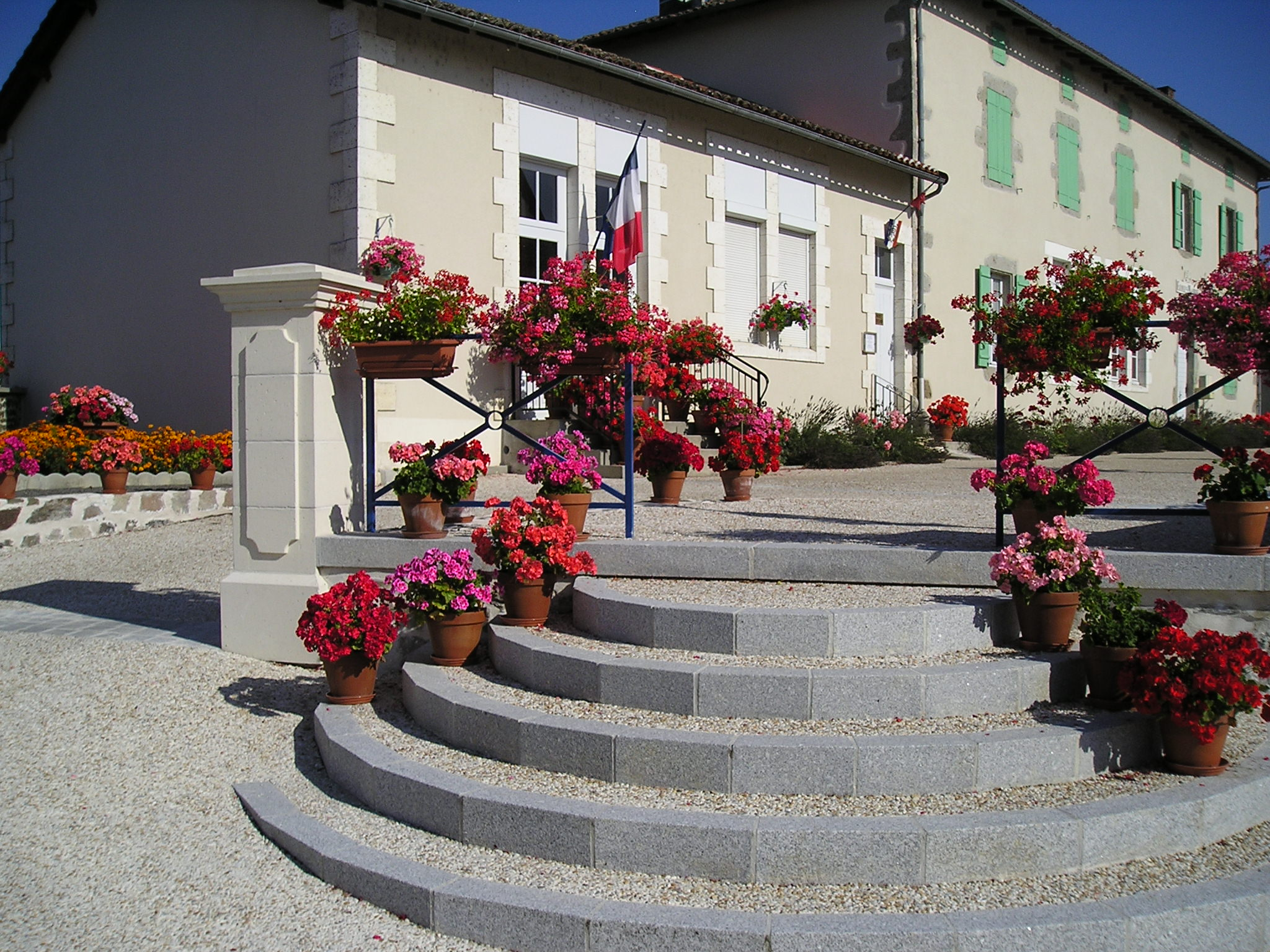
- Town hall and school
- Location of Pressignac
- Location within France Location within Nouvelle-Aquitaine
- Coordinates: 45°49′36″N 0°44′38″E
- Country: France
- Region: Nouvelle-Aquitaine
- Department: Charente
- Arrondissement: Confolens
- Canton: Charente-Vienne
- Intercommunality: Charente Limousine

Government
  - Mayor (2020–2026): Francis Beaumatin
- Area^{1}: 28.15 km^{2} (10.87 sq mi)
- Elevation: 264 m (866 ft)
- Highest elevation: 282 m (925 ft)
- Lowest elevation: 163 m (535 ft)
- Population (2023): 398
  - Density: 14.1/km^{2} (36.6/sq mi)
- Time zone: UTC+01:00 (CET)
  - Summer (DST): UTC+02:00 (CEST)
- INSEE/Postal code: 16270 /16150
- ^{1} French Land Register data, which excludes lakes, ponds, glaciers > 1 km^{2} (0.386 sq mi or 247 acres) and river estuaries.

Pressignac (French pronunciation: [pʁesiɲak]; Occitan: Pressinhac) is a commune in the Charente department in southwestern France.

The village has thirty or so hamlets scattered around the outskirts. These include: Bandes, Bonetève, Bors, Bouchet, Bournet, Château Banal, Chauffie, Croix, Fayolles, Fontceeverane, Fougeras, Gardette, Les Gouttes, Le Grand Wood, Grand Chalais, Guerlie, Guierce, Judie, Magniéras, Mandat, Chez Mariaud, Martin, Martinie, Mas du Baud, Minor, Pers, Petit Chalais, Puymis, Valette, Veilleraud, Vouéras.

The Asteroid

200 million years ago, an asteroid with a diameter of 1.5 km struck the earth between the current hamlets of Judie, Valette and Babaudus. The impact left a crater 21 km in diameter that has long since been destroyed by erosion. The rocks within it were substantially changed more than 5 km deep. The rocks resulting from this cataclysm around Pressignac are unique: they were fractured and melted, they are called impact breccias and these rocks have been used for the construction of houses and farm buildings in the immediate area.

Protohistory

The Hallstatt civilization during the Iron Age used a road from Narbonne to Nantes and Brittany. This old road crosses the municipal territory of Pressignac, passing by Mandat, the Bost de la Herse, the Motte, the Négrerie and Besses wood, skirting two buildings dating from this time.

Caesar's camp, on the Petit Chêne hill, between Bors and Mandat, is a 100-meter square surrounded on three sides by an embankment almost three meters wide and one meter high. Despite its name, it was not a Roman camp (although it is likely that the Romans reused it). One hypothesis is that this camp was to be a kind of caravanserai, a stage on this trading route of the Iron Age. Neolithic axes found in large numbers around this prehistoric site might also suggest its occupation. This land also served much later, shortly before the war of 1870, as a field of military maneuvers.

== Population ==
Historical population
Year	Pop.	±% p.a.
1968	665	—
1975	577	−2.01%
1982	519	−1.50%
1990	477	−1.05%
1999	449	−0.67%
2007	427	−0.63%
2012	389	−1.85%
2017	349	−2.15%
2023	398	+2.21%
Source: INSEE

== See also ==
- Rochechouart impact structure
- Communes of the Charente department
