= Confolens =

- Subprefecture and commune
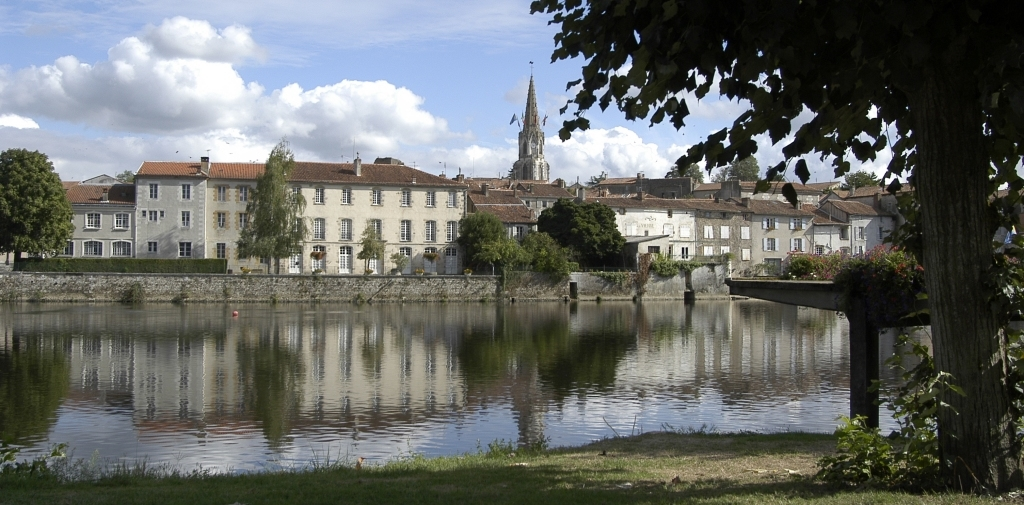
- The Vienne river in Confolens

- Coat of arms
- Location of Confolens
- Location within France Location within Nouvelle-Aquitaine
- Coordinates: 46°00′52″N 0°40′24″E
- Country: France
- Region: Nouvelle-Aquitaine
- Department: Charente
- Arrondissement: Confolens
- Canton: Charente-Vienne
- Intercommunality: Charente Limousine

Government
  - Mayor (2020–2026): Jean-Noël Dupré
- Area^{1}: 23.63 km^{2} (9.12 sq mi)
- Elevation: 152 m (499 ft)
- Highest elevation: 222 m (728 ft)
- Lowest elevation: 127 m (417 ft)
- Population (2023): 2,730
  - Density: 116/km^{2} (299/sq mi)
- Time zone: UTC+01:00 (CET)
  - Summer (DST): UTC+02:00 (CEST)
- INSEE/Postal code: 16106 /16500
- ^{1} French Land Register data, which excludes lakes, ponds, glaciers > 1 km^{2} (0.386 sq mi or 247 acres) and river estuaries.

Confolens (French pronunciation: [kɔ̃fɔlɑ̃] ; Limousin: Cofolents, [kufuˈleⁿ]) is a commune in southwestern France. It is one of the two sub-prefectures of the Charente department. Confolens is the administrative center of a largely rural district, which has seen the development of tourism in recent years. On 1 January 2016, the former commune Saint-Germain-de-Confolens was merged into Confolens.

== Geography ==
Confolens is located at the confluence of the Vienne and Goire rivers. This location is at the origin of its name. Confolens is also at the point where the Charente and Limousin regions meet, hence the name sometimes used to describe the area of "Charente Limousine".

== History ==
Confolens was built around a fortress first mentioned in the eleventh century. It still has picturesque remnants of its medieval past, including city walls and several houses dating from the fifteenth to the eighteenth centuries. It also features a bridge first mentioned in the fourteenth century, and two churches from the 11th and 14th centuries respectively.

In the nineteenth century, Confolens developed itself as the administrative center for a considerable agriculture area, due to its role as sous-prefecture and the distance of all other major towns Angoulême (to the south-west), Limoges and Poitiers are all about 70 kilometres away. It has several handsome nineteenth century administrative buildings, some of which were built by Paul Abadie, who was very active in the region.

There has been limited further urbanization in the twentieth century. The population of the town has aged, and the number of agriculture and industrial jobs have declined. British and Dutch have been acquiring property in and around the town, and now form a significant presence.

One of the most prominent people to have hailed from Confolens is Émile Roux, a physician and immunologist who was a close collaborator of Louis Pasteur. The former Confolens high school was named for Roux.

== Population ==
Historical population
Year	Pop.	±% p.a.
1968	2,971	—
1975	3,030	+0.28%
1982	3,137	+0.50%
1990	3,013	−0.50%
1999	2,953	−0.22%
2007	2,896	−0.24%
2012	2,726	−1.20%
2017	2,670	−0.41%
2023	2,730	+0.37%
Populations of the area corresponding with the commune of Confolens at 1 January 2025. Source: INSEE

== Events ==
Confolens is the home of the Festival de Folklore, one of France's largest and best known folklore festivals, which takes place annually in August.

== Twin towns ==
Confolens is twinned with:

- Pitlochry, Scotland, United Kingdom

== See also ==
- Communes of the Charente department
