= Saulgond =

- Commune
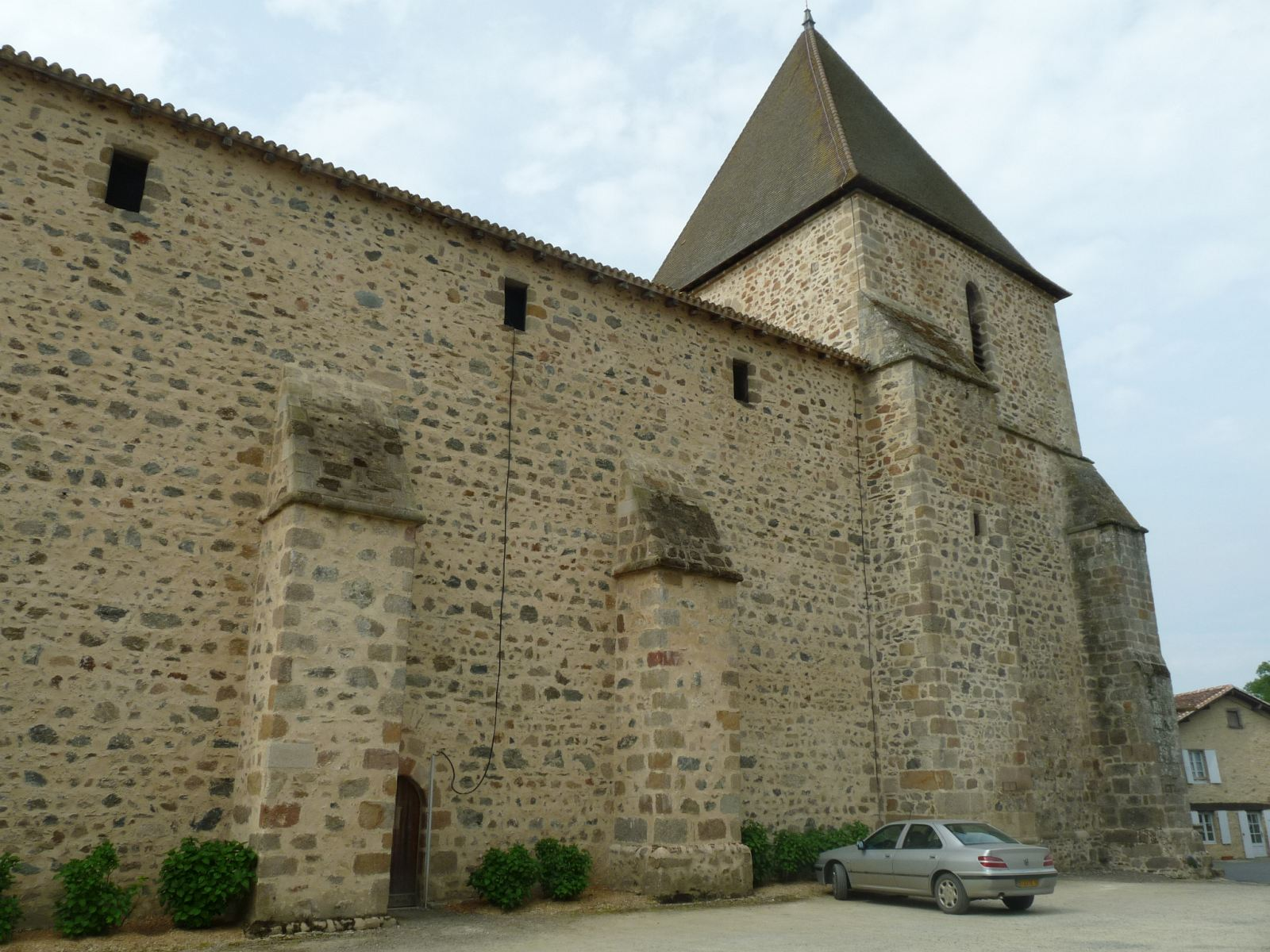
- The church in Saulgond
- Location of Saulgond
- Location within France Location within Nouvelle-Aquitaine
- Coordinates: 45°57′04″N 0°47′06″E
- Country: France
- Region: Nouvelle-Aquitaine
- Department: Charente
- Arrondissement: Confolens
- Canton: Charente-Vienne

Government
  - Mayor (2020–2026): Denis Vitel
- Area^{1}: 27.36 km^{2} (10.56 sq mi)
- Elevation: 212 m (696 ft)
- Highest elevation: 284 m (932 ft)
- Lowest elevation: 172 m (564 ft)
- Population (2023): 530
  - Density: 19/km^{2} (50/sq mi)
- Time zone: UTC+01:00 (CET)
  - Summer (DST): UTC+02:00 (CEST)
- INSEE/Postal code: 16363 /16420
- ^{1} French Land Register data, which excludes lakes, ponds, glaciers > 1 km^{2} (0.386 sq mi or 247 acres) and river estuaries.

Saulgond (French pronunciation: [solɡɔ̃]; Occitan: Saugond) is a commune in the Charente department in southwestern France.

== Population ==
Historical population
Year	Pop.	±% p.a.
1968	627	—
1975	533	−2.29%
1982	464	−1.96%
1990	475	+0.29%
1999	459	−0.38%
2007	503	+1.15%
2012	507	+0.16%
2017	522	+0.58%
2023	530	+0.25%
Source: INSEE

== See also ==
- Communes of the Charente department
