= Canton of Charente-Vienne =

Coordinates: 46.01°N 0.67°E

- Canton
- Situation of the canton of Charente-Vienne in the department of Charente
- Country: France
- Region: Nouvelle-Aquitaine
- Department: Charente
- No. of communes: {{{nbcomm}}}
- Population (2023): 18,508
- INSEE code: 1610

The canton of Charente-Vienne is an administrative division of the Charente department, southwestern France. It was created at the French canton reorganisation which came into effect in March 2015. Its seat is in Confolens.

It consists of the following communes:

1. Abzac
2. Ambernac
3. Ansac-sur-Vienne
4. Brigueuil
5. Brillac
6. Chabanais
7. Chabrac
8. Chassenon
9. Chirac
10. Confolens
11. Épenède
12. Esse
13. Étagnac
14. Exideuil-sur-Vienne
15. Hiesse
16. Lessac
17. Lesterps
18. Manot
19. Montrollet
20. Oradour-Fanais
21. Pleuville
22. Pressignac
23. Saint-Christophe
24. Saint-Maurice-des-Lions
25. Saint-Quentin-sur-Charente
26. Saulgond
27. Terres-de-Haute-Charente (partly)
