= Chabanais =

- Commune
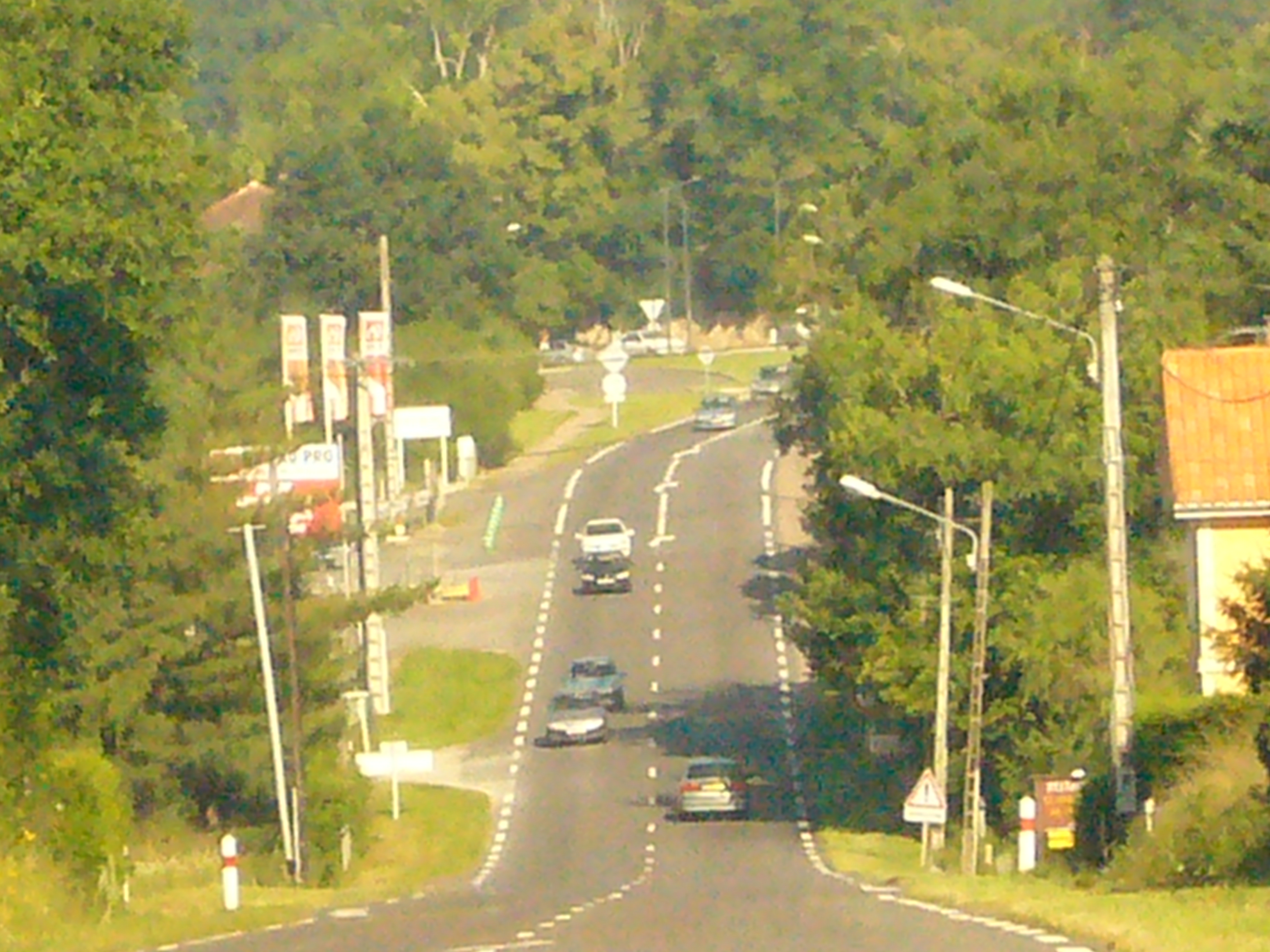
- Route nationale 141

- Coat of arms
- Location of Chabanais
- Location within France Location within Nouvelle-Aquitaine
- Coordinates: 45°52′30″N 0°43′14″E
- Country: France
- Region: Nouvelle-Aquitaine
- Department: Charente
- Arrondissement: Confolens
- Canton: Charente-Vienne

Government
  - Mayor (2020–2026): Michel Boutant
- Area^{1}: 15.01 km^{2} (5.80 sq mi)
- Elevation: 156 m (512 ft)
- Highest elevation: 250 m (820 ft)
- Lowest elevation: 148 m (486 ft)
- Population (2023): 1,589
  - Density: 105.9/km^{2} (274.2/sq mi)
- Time zone: UTC+01:00 (CET)
  - Summer (DST): UTC+02:00 (CEST)
- INSEE/Postal code: 16070 /16150
- ^{1} French Land Register data, which excludes lakes, ponds, glaciers > 1 km^{2} (0.386 sq mi or 247 acres) and river estuaries.

Chabanais (French pronunciation: [ʃabanɛ]; Occitan: Chabanès) is a commune in the Charente department in southwestern France.

The commune is listed as a Village étape.

== Geography ==
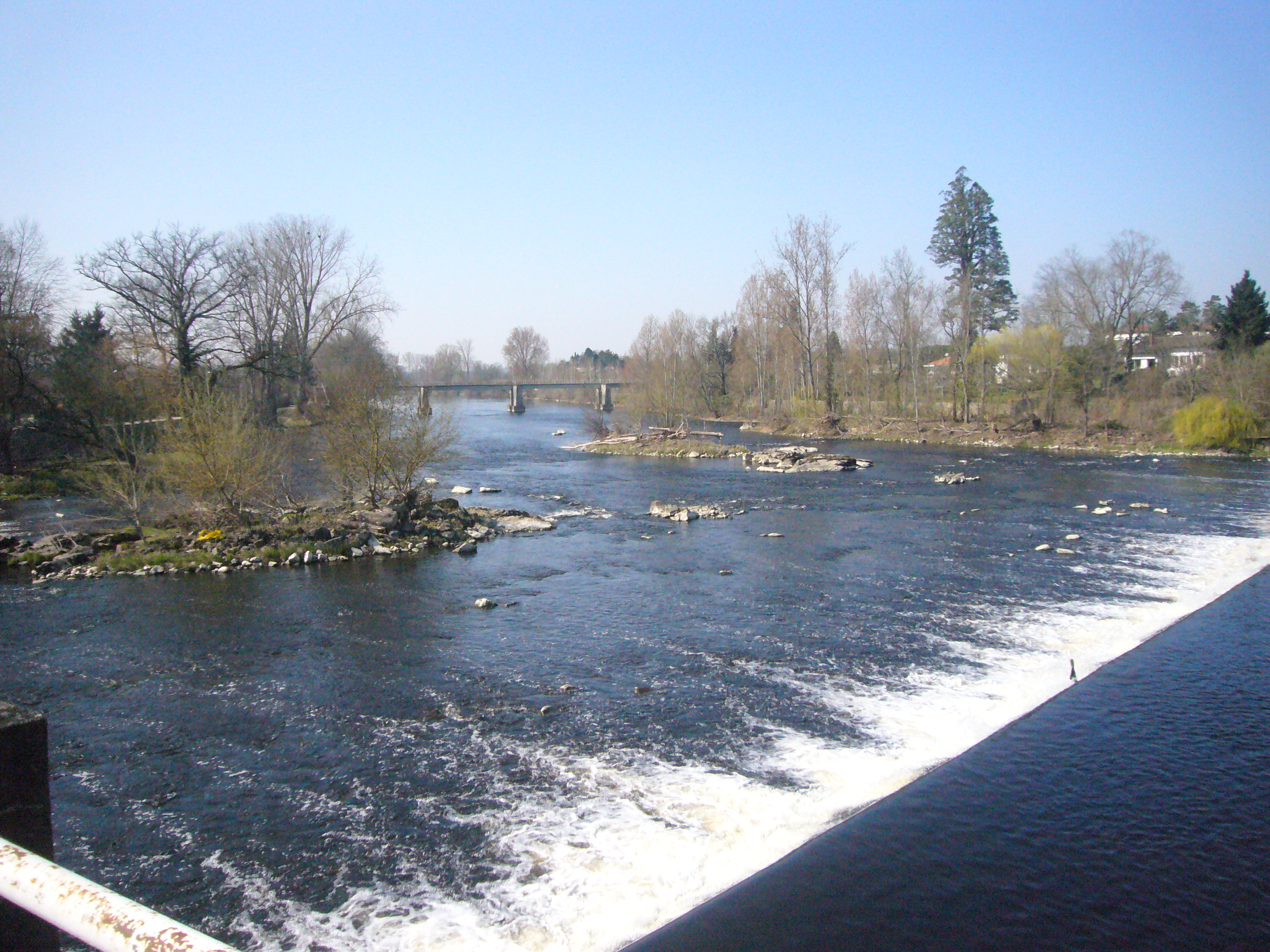
The Vienne River close to the bridge

The river Vienne passes through Chabanais. The village is located in the Rochechouart impact structure. The ancient asteroid impact crater associated with it has eroded away and is no longer visible. Located in the heart of the Charente, Chabanais is 42 km west of Limoges, 50 km northeast of Angoulême, 77 km north of Périgueux, and 84 km southeast of Poitiers.

The town is small enough to be considered a large village, and it boasts an open-air market every Thursday, adding to a number of small, privately owned shops. The town has a rail station connecting with Limoges to the east and Angoulême to the west.

== History ==
Chabanais was struck by an F2 tornado on 5 May 1997. In the summer of 2018, the town centre and some surrounding hamlets were struck by a devastating hailstorm which punctured many roofs on buildings and destroyed hundreds of car windscreens and bodywork.

== Population ==
Historical population
Year	Pop.	±% p.a.
1968	2,439	—
1975	2,434	−0.03%
1982	2,242	−1.17%
1990	2,107	−0.77%
1999	1,944	−0.89%
2007	1,885	−0.38%
2012	1,833	−0.56%
2017	1,651	−2.07%
2023	1,589	−0.64%
Source: INSEE

== See also ==
- Communes of the Charente department
