= Angoulême =

Angoulême Engoulaeme (Poitevin–Saintongeais)
- Prefecture and commune
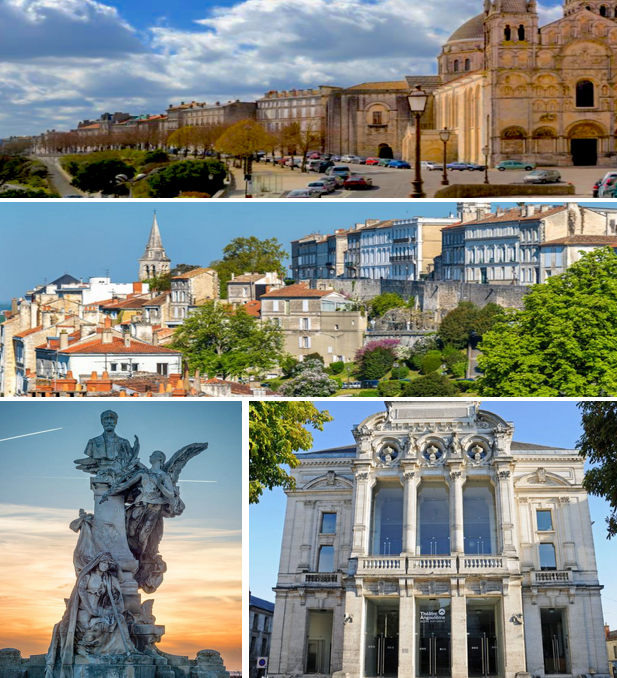
- From top to bottom, left to right: The Cathedral of Angoulême; Panoramic view of the city; Monument to Carnot; Théatre d' Angoulême

- Coat of arms
- Location of Angoulême
- Location within France Location within Nouvelle-Aquitaine
- Coordinates: 45°39′N 0°10′E
- Country: France
- Region: Nouvelle-Aquitaine
- Department: Charente
- Arrondissement: Angoulême
- Canton: Angoulême-1, 2 and 3
- Intercommunality: Grand Angoulême

Government
  - Mayor (2020–2026): Xavier Bonnefont
- Area^{1}: 21.85 km^{2} (8.44 sq mi)
- Elevation: 100 m (330 ft)
- Highest elevation: 130 m (430 ft)
- Lowest elevation: 27 m (89 ft)
- Population (2023): 41,908
  - Density: 1,918/km^{2} (4,968/sq mi)
- Demonym(s): Angoumoisin (m); Angoumoisine (f)
- Time zone: UTC+01:00 (CET)
  - Summer (DST): UTC+02:00 (CEST)
- INSEE/Postal code: 16015 /16000
- Website: angouleme.fr
- ^{1} French Land Register data, which excludes lakes, ponds, glaciers > 1 km^{2} (0.386 sq mi or 247 acres) and river estuaries.

Angoulême (French pronunciation: [ɑ̃ɡulɛːm]; Poitevin-Saintongeais: Engoulaeme; Occitan: Engoleime) is a small city in the southwestern French department of Charente, of which it is the prefecture.

Located on a plateau overlooking a meander of the river Charente, the city is nicknamed the "balcony of the southwest". The city proper's population is a little less than 42,000 but it is the centre of an urban area of 110,000 people extending more than fifteen kilometres (9.3 miles) from east to west.

Angouleme was the capital of Angoumois during the Ancien Régime. It was prone to siege attempts due to its ideal position at the crossroads of a number of key routes. Despite being known for the challenges of multiple seiges in the past, the city, perched on a rocky spur, has inherited a large historical, religious, and urban heritage which attracts a many tourists.

Angoulême is at the centre of an agglomeration that is one of the most industrialised regions between Loire and Garonne (the paper industry was established in the 16th century, a foundry and electromechanical engineering developed more recently). It is also a commercial and administrative city with a university of technology. Cultural events in the city include the Angoulême International Comics Festival, the FFA Angoulême Francophone Film Festival and the Musiques Métisses Festival. Angoulême hosts 40 animation and video game studios, which produce half of France's animated production. Wes Anderson's The French Dispatch was filmed in the city.

Angoulême is called "Ville de l'Image" which means literally "City of the Image". The commune has been awarded four flowers by the National Council of Towns and Villages in Bloom in the Competition of cities and villages in Bloom.

== Geography ==
Angoulême is an Acropolis city located on a hill overlooking a loop of the Charente limited in area upstream by the confluence of the Touvre and downstream by the Anguienne and Eaux Claires.

=== Location and access ===
Angoulême is located at the intersection of a major north–south axis: the N10 Paris-Bayonne; and the east–west axis: the N14 route Central-Europe Atlantique Limoges-Saintes. Angoulême is also connected to Périgueux and Saint-Jean-d'Angely by the D939 and to Libourne by the D674.

- By train: the Paris-Bordeaux line, served mainly by TGV, passes through Angoulême and the TER Limoges-Saintes provides connections.
- By water: although the river Charente is currently only used for tourism, it was a communication channel, especially for freight, until the 19th century and the port of l'Houmeau was very busy.

The Angoulême-Cognac International Airport is at Brie-Champniers.

=== Districts ===
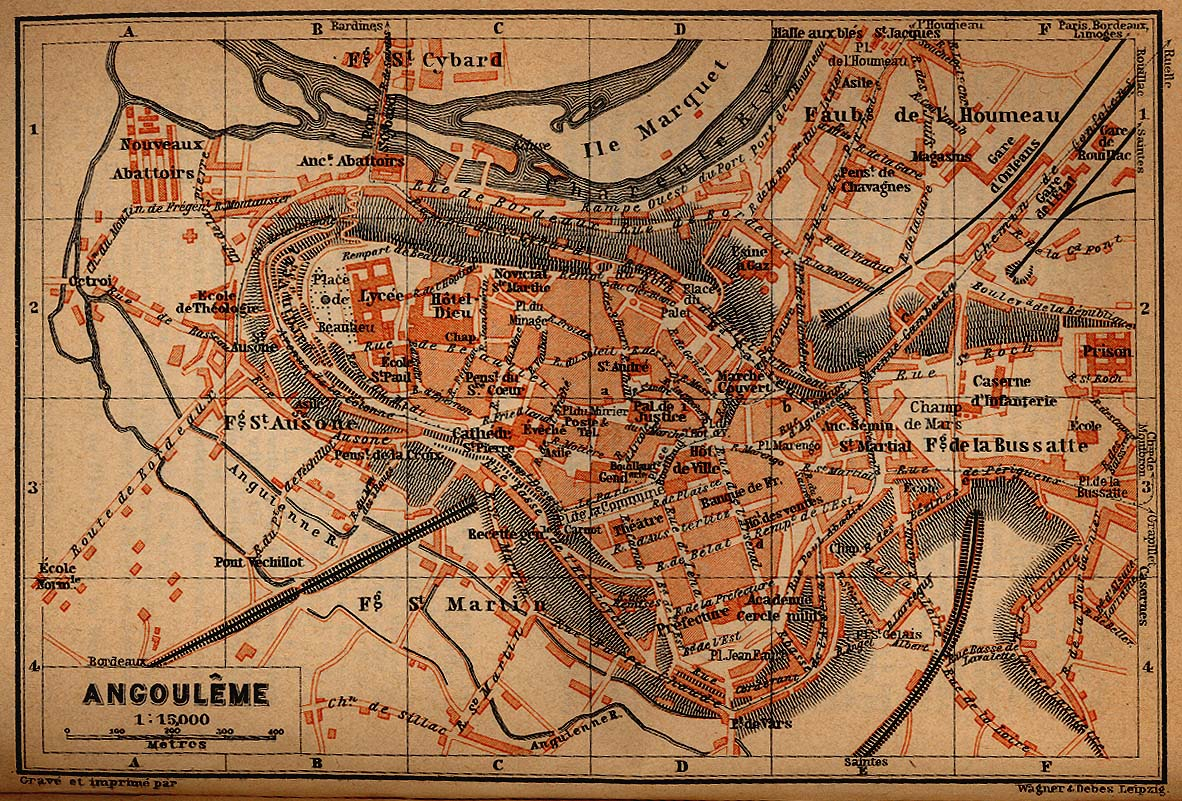
Map of Angoulême in 1914

Old Angoulême is the old part between the ramparts and the town centre with winding streets and small squares. The city centre is also located on the plateau and was portrayed by Honoré de Balzac in "The Lost Illusions" as "the height of grandeur and power". There is a Castle, a town hall, a prefecture, and a cathedral with grand houses everywhere. Unlike Old Angoulême, however, the entire city centre was greatly rebuilt in the 19th century.

Surrounding the city were five old faubourgs: l'Houmeau, Saint-Cybard, Saint-Martin, Saint-Ausone, and la Bussatte. The district of l'Houmeau was described by Balzac as "based on trade and money" because this district lived on trade, boatmen, and their scows. The port of l'Houmeau was created in 1280 on the river bank. It marked the beginning of the navigable part from Angoulême to the sea. Saint-Cybard, on the bank of the Charente, was created around the Abbey of Saint-Cybard then became an industrial area with papermills, especially Le Nil. Saint-Martin - Saint-Ausone is a district composed of two former parishes outside the ramparts. At La Bussatte the Champ de Mars esplanade is now converted into a shopping mall, and adjoins Saint-Gelais.

Today the city has fifteen districts:

- Centre-ville
- Old Angoulême
- Saint-Ausone - Saint-Martin
- Saint-Gelais
- La Bussatte - Champ de Mars
- L'Houmeau
- Saint-Cybard
- Victor-Hugo, Saint-Roch is notable for its military presence.
- Basseau is a district which was created in the 19th century with the port of Basseau, the explosives factory in 1821, the Laroche-Joubert papermill in 1842, then the bridge in 1850.
- Sillac - La Grande-Garenne was a private housing estate then was built up with HLM units.
- Bel-Air, la Grand Font in the railway station district with housing blocks from the 1950s at Grand Font.
- La Madeleine which was completely rebuilt after the bombings of 1944.
- Ma Campagne is a district which was detached from Puymoyen commune in 1945 and built-up as a collective habitat from 1972.
- Le Petit Fresquet was also detached from Puymoyen and is semi-rural.
- Frégeneuil was also detached from Puymoyen and is semi-rural.

=== Panorama of the city ===
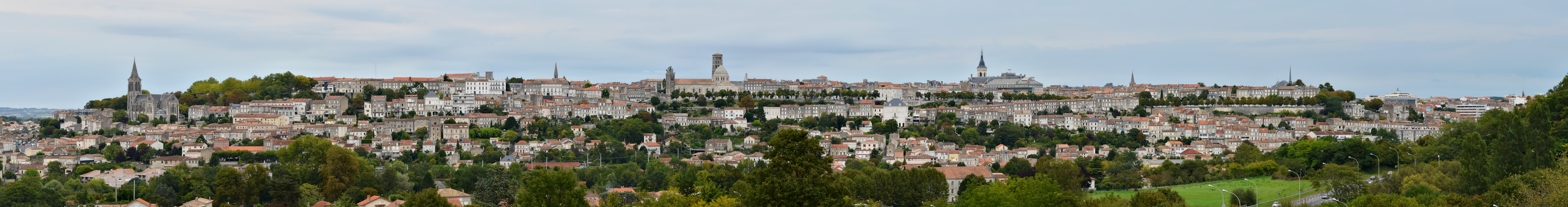
Panorama of Angoulême from Saint-Martin (South). The church of Saint-Ausone, the cathedral of Saint-Pierre, and the city hall can all be seen.

=== Hydrography ===
The Port-l'Houmeau, the old port on the Charente located in the district of l'Houmeau is in a flood zone and during floods the Besson Bey Boulevard is usually cut.

=== Geology ===
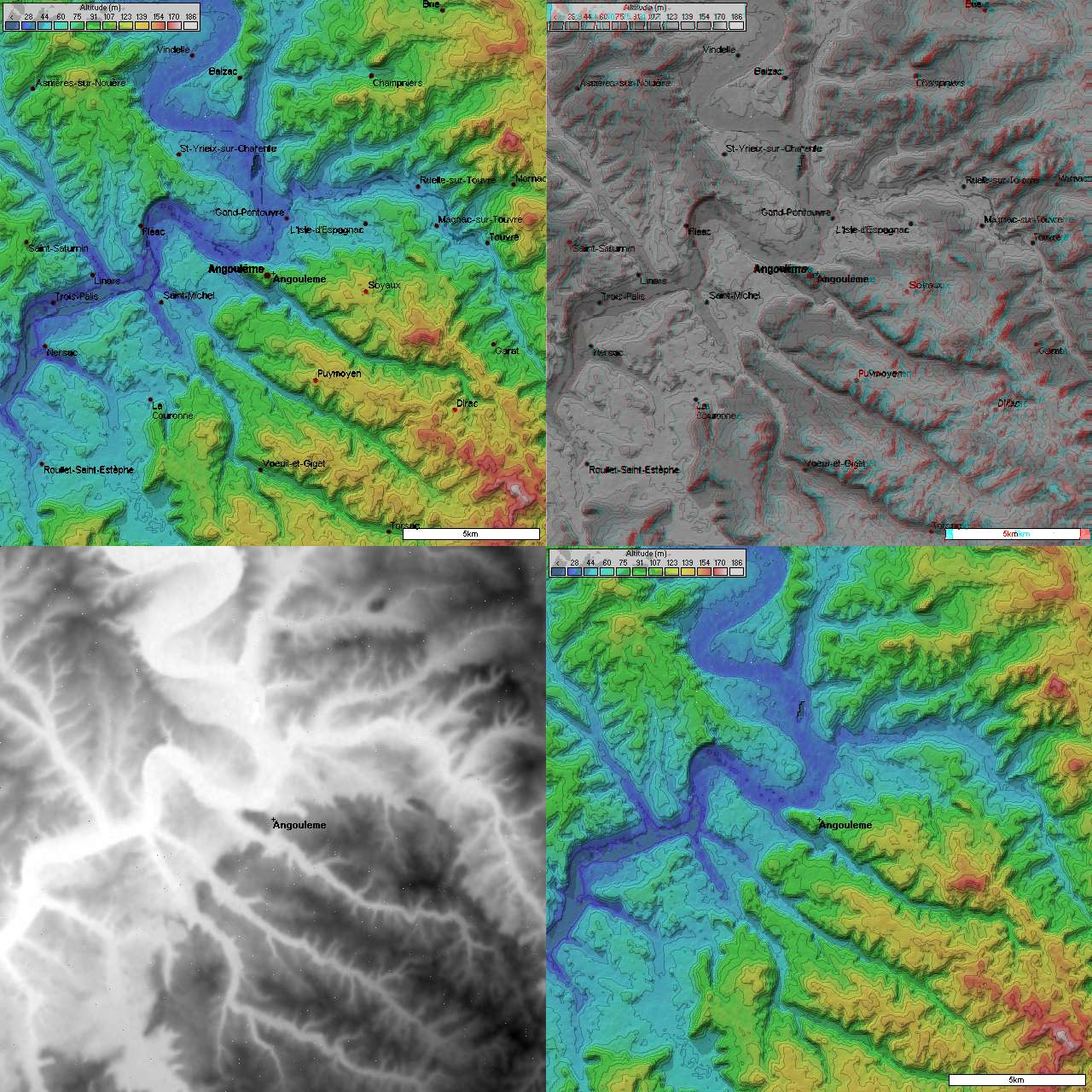
Topography of Angoulême city

Geologically the town belongs to the Aquitaine Basin as does three-quarters of the western department of Charente.

The commune is located on the same limestone from the Upper Cretaceous period which occupies the southern half of the department of Charente, not far from Jurassic formations beginning at Gond-Pontouvre.

The earliest Cretaceous period - the Cenomanian - is in the relatively low areas (l'Houmeau, the heights of Saint-Cybard, Sillac), at an average altitude of 50m.

The city was established on the Plateau (altitude 100 m) that dominates the loop of the River Charente, a Turonian (also called Angoumien) formation which forms a dissected plateau of parallel valleys and a cuesta facing north that extends towards La Couronne to the west and Garat to the east.

This limestone plateau contains natural cavities which have been refurbished by man in the form of three or four floors of caves, some of which include antique grain silos.

The valley of the Charente is made up of old and new alluvium which provides rich soil for farming and some sandpits. These alluvial deposits were deposited successively during the Quaternary period on the inside of two meanders of the river that are Basseau and Saint-Cybard. The oldest alluviums are on the plain of Basseau and reach a relative height of 25 m.

=== Relief ===
The old part of the city is built on the plateau—a rocky outcrop created by the valleys of the Anguienne and Charente at an altitude of 102 m (335 ft)—while on the river bank the area subject to flooding is 27 m (89 ft) high. Angoulême is characterized by the presence of ramparts on a cliff 80 m (260 ft) high.

The plateau of Ma Campagne, south of the old town, has almost the same features and peaks at 109 m in the woods of Saint-Martin. The plateau is elongated and separates the valleys of Eaux Claires, which is the southern boundary of the commune, from that of Anguienne, which is parallel.

Both plateaux overlook the Charente valley and the outlying areas such as l'Houmeau, Basseau, and Sillac at their western ends. The plateau of Angoulême is the northwest extension of the Soyaux plateau. L'Houmeau, the station area, and that of Grand-Font are to the north of the plateau along the small Vimière valley, also a tributary of the Charente, but further north (towards Gond-Pontouvre and L'Isle-d'Espagnac) than Anguienne is to the south.

The highest point of the city of Angoulême is at an altitude of 133 m near Peusec located to the south-east near the border with Puymoyen. The lowest point is 27 m, located along the Charente at Basseau.

=== The ramparts ===
Since Roman times ramparts have surrounded the Plateau of Angoulême. Repeatedly destroyed and rebuilt, their reconstruction was finally stopped in the 19th century. The Ramparts are classified as historical monuments and the Ramparts Tour is one of the main attractions of the city.

The Ramparts of Angoulême

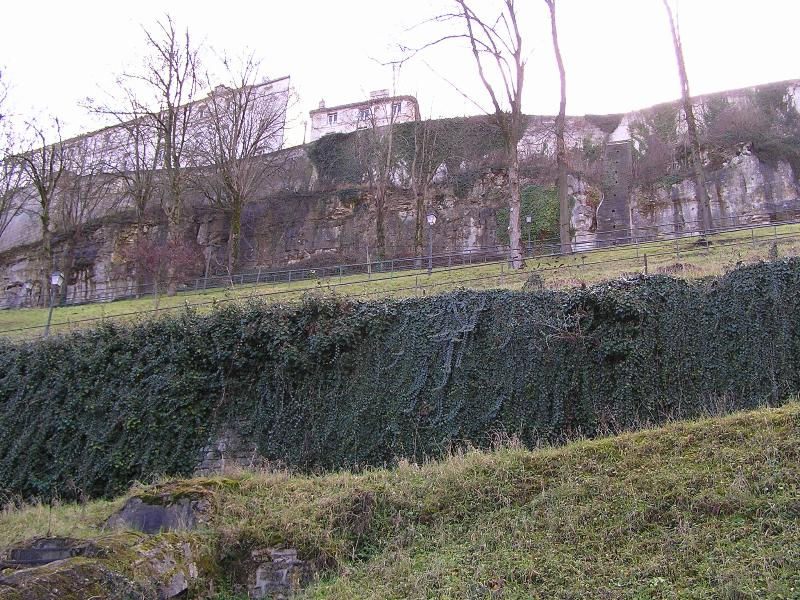
North Rampart

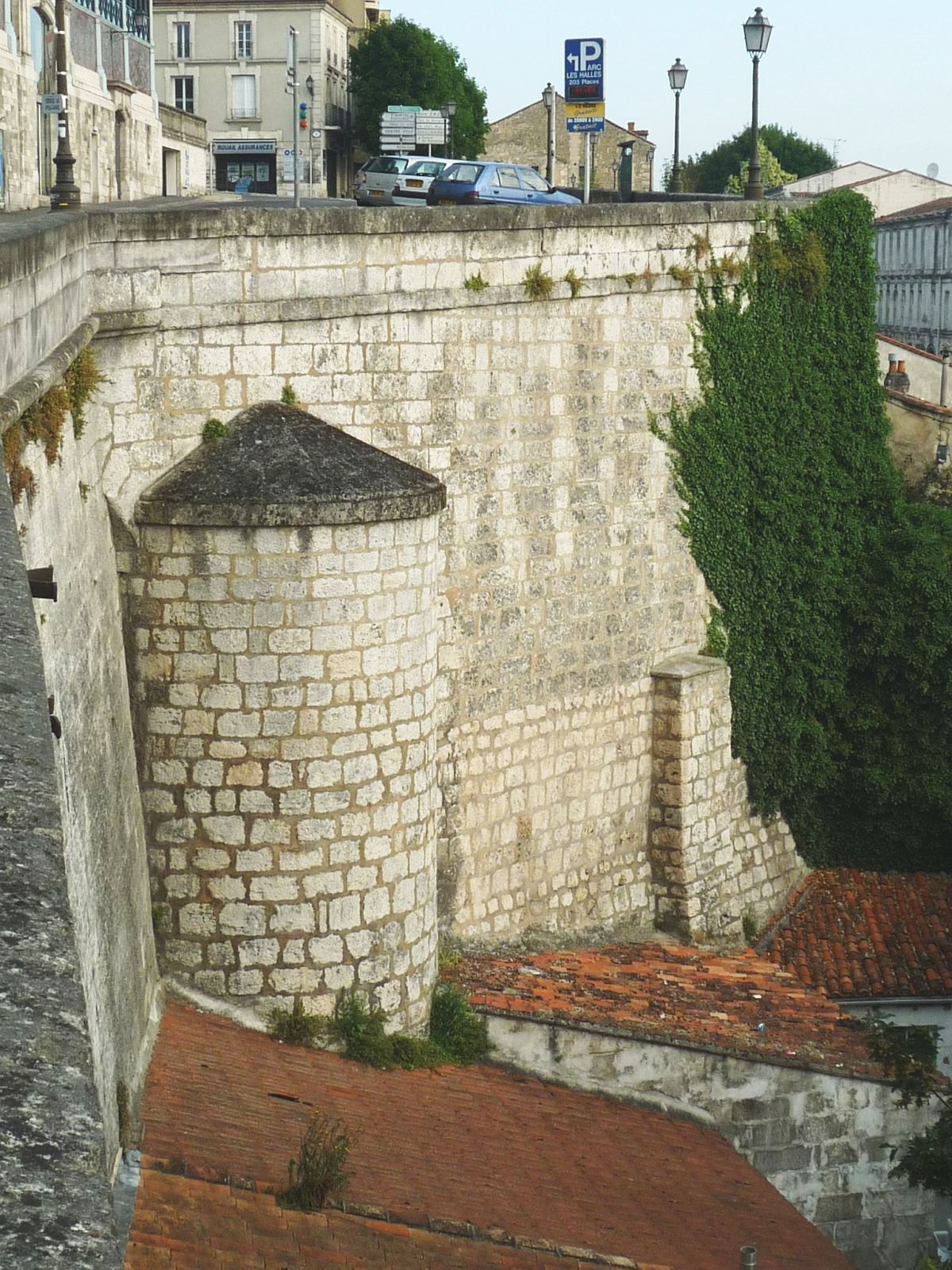
Near the covered market

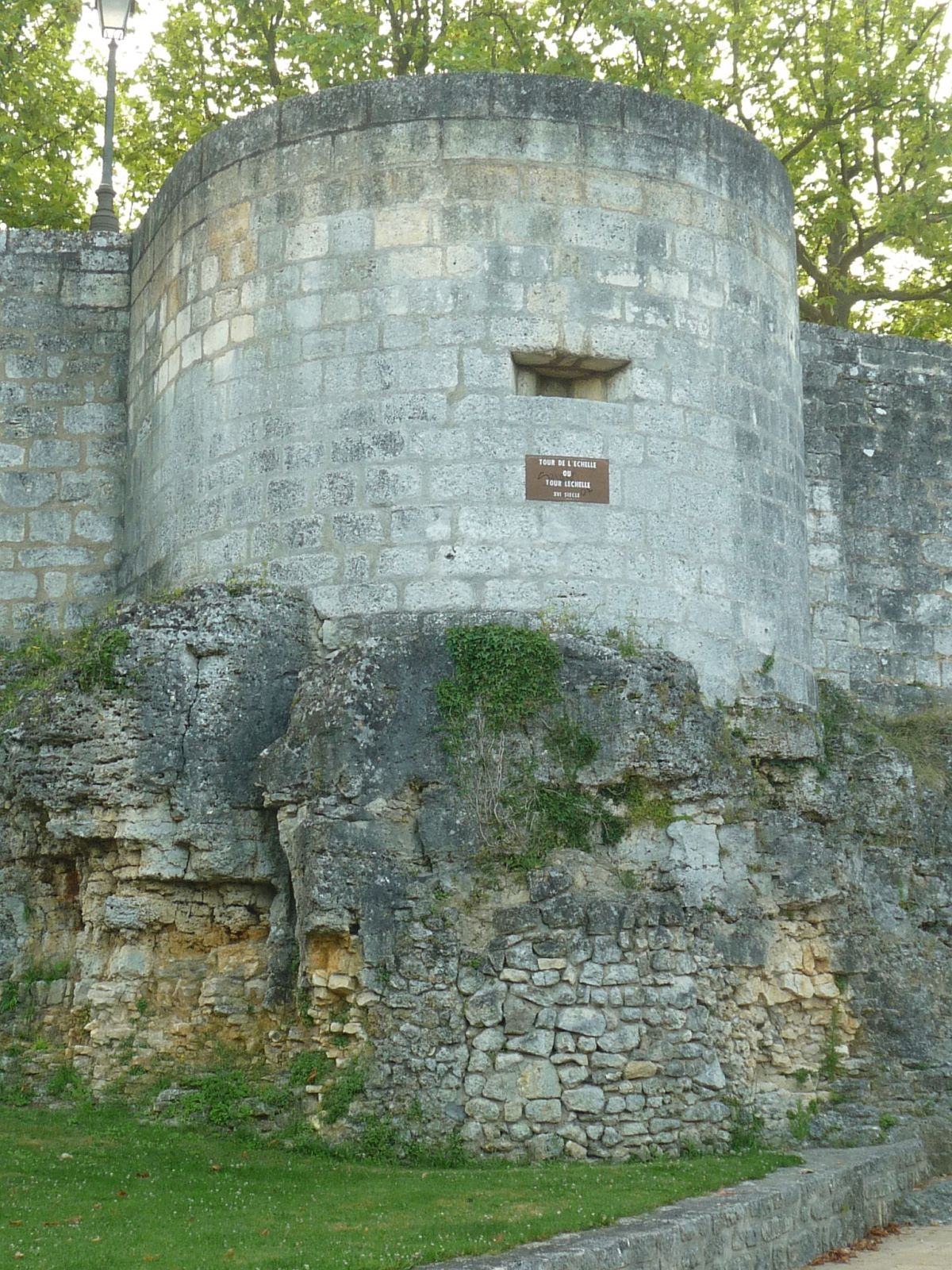
The Léchelle Tower

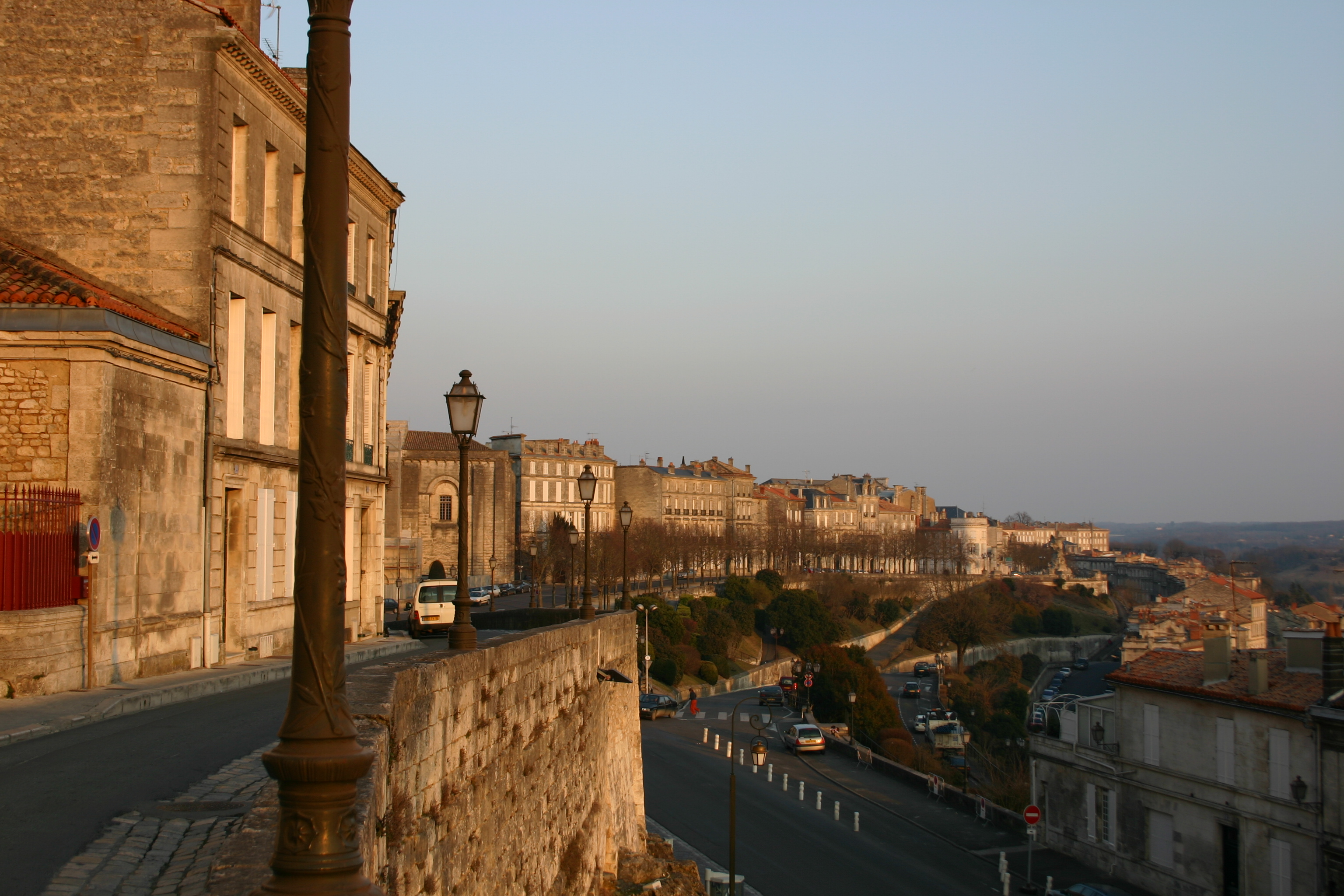
The Rampart du midi

=== Climate ===
Angoulême is under an oceanic influence and similar to that of the city of Cognac where the departmental weather station is located. Precipitations are modest all year long, with a slight drying tendency during summer.

Comparison of local Meteorological data with other cities in France
Town	Sunshine (hours/yr)	Rain (mm/yr)	Snow (days/yr)	Storm (days/yr)	Fog (days/yr)
National average	1,973	770	14	22	40
Angoulême	2,027	763	3	23	54
Paris	1,661	637	12	18	10
Nice	2,724	767	1	29	1
Strasbourg	1,693	665	29	29	56
Brest	1,605	1,211	7	12	75

Climate data for Angoulême (Angoulême–Cognac International Airport) (2009–2020 normals, extremes 2009–present)
Month	Jan	Feb	Mar	Apr	May	Jun	Jul	Aug	Sep	Oct	Nov	Dec	Year
Record high °C (°F)	18.2 (64.8)	24.1 (75.4)	26.1 (79.0)	29.2 (84.6)	37.8 (100.0)	38.8 (101.8)	39.8 (103.6)	39.6 (103.3)	37.3 (99.1)	32.2 (90.0)	24.2 (75.6)	18.1 (64.6)	39.8 (103.6)
Mean daily maximum °C (°F)	8.7 (47.7)	10.2 (50.4)	14.3 (57.7)	17.9 (64.2)	20.6 (69.1)	24.2 (75.6)	27.2 (81.0)	27.2 (81.0)	24.0 (75.2)	18.8 (65.8)	13.4 (56.1)	10.2 (50.4)	18.1 (64.6)
Daily mean °C (°F)	5.9 (42.6)	6.3 (43.3)	9.6 (49.3)	12.5 (54.5)	15.3 (59.5)	18.8 (65.8)	21.2 (70.2)	21.0 (69.8)	18.3 (64.9)	14.4 (57.9)	10.1 (50.2)	7.1 (44.8)	13.4 (56.1)
Mean daily minimum °C (°F)	3.0 (37.4)	2.5 (36.5)	4.9 (40.8)	7.2 (45.0)	10.0 (50.0)	13.4 (56.1)	15.3 (59.5)	14.9 (58.8)	12.6 (54.7)	10.0 (50.0)	6.9 (44.4)	4.0 (39.2)	8.7 (47.7)
Record low °C (°F)	−7.8 (18.0)	−12.8 (9.0)	−4.9 (23.2)	−3.2 (26.2)	0.6 (33.1)	5.4 (41.7)	8.7 (47.7)	8.4 (47.1)	3.9 (39.0)	−2.0 (28.4)	−4.6 (23.7)	−10.7 (12.7)	−12.8 (9.0)
Average precipitation mm (inches)	89.6 (3.53)	66.2 (2.61)	58.8 (2.31)	60.1 (2.37)	71.6 (2.82)	71.4 (2.81)	36.7 (1.44)	44.0 (1.73)	51.6 (2.03)	69.8 (2.75)	93.6 (3.69)	101.4 (3.99)	814.8 (32.08)
Average precipitation days (≥ 1.0 mm)	14.1	11.3	10.8	8.7	10.2	9.2	5.8	6.3	7.3	9.7	13.1	13.0	119.4
Source: Meteociel

== Toponymy ==
Since Antiquity and through the Middle Ages, the name of the town has been attested in many forms in Latin and Old French:

- Iculisma and Eculisna from the 4th century
- civitas Engolismensium around 400AD
- Ecolisima (Merovingian currency)
- Ecolisina and Aquilisima in 511
- Ecolisna in the 6th century
- Egolisma
- Egolisina in the 10th century
- Equalisma, Engolma, Egolesma, and Engolisma
- Engolesme at the end of the 12th century.

The absence of any convincing explanation of the origin of the name of the city has led to several attempts to fit etymological explanations unrelated to the well documented old forms and phonetically unlikely:

- It came from incolumissima meaning "very safe and healthy," but there is no trace of an [n] in the most ancient forms and no trace of a [mi] either.
- It was an alteration of in collisnā meaning "on the hill" but a toponym is never formed from the Latin preposition in. As for the French word colline (hill), it was borrowed from the Italian collina at the time of the Renaissance (attested for the first time in 1555). In addition the suffix -isnā was not used to produce derivations from Latin words and it is doubtful that it even exists. Finally, independent alterations of regular phonetic changes occur as a result of analogy or more precisely of popular etymology: that is to say analogy with other similar and frequent used names in the region or an attempt to connect the toponym to a term that makes sense. It is clear that the old forms of Angoulême are mostly obscure.

Some hypotheses have been advanced with a stronger basis:

- It is possible to recognize the suffix -isma in some of the oldest forms which represents an evolution of the Gallic suffix -isama (usually a superlative mark) which is found in the name of the Gallic divinity Belisama and very common in toponymy in toponymic types such as Blesme, Bellême, etc. including changes in the final -esme, -ême which is similar to Angoulême. (Note: Xavier Delamarre also cited Uxisama "very high" giving Exmes, Huismes, etc. and *Lētisamā "very grey" giving Louesme (Côte-d'Or, Leesma in 1101), Lesme (Saône-et-loire)) In this context the first element would be Icul- / Ecol- an unknown pre-Latin element.
- The identification of the primitive form Eculisna then alternating the old forms -isna and -isma led Ernest Nègre to prefer the first with -isna. The first element would be Ecul-. According to him, we can neither affirm the Celticity of these two elements nor their meaning. The alteration in *Angulisma was caused by the attraction of the Germanic personal name Angelisma whose existence was confirmed by Marie-Thérèse Morlet.
- Iculisma / Ecolisma would consist of a Gallic radical eco meaning "water", followed by the suffix -lisima meaning "relates to". Iculisma would be "well-watered". Xavier Delamarre analysed the element Eco- to come from Equoranda (or Egoranda) as the origin of many names in France and considers that the element ico / equo- was not Celtic.

At the time of the French Revolution the city was known by the transient name of Montagne-Charente.

- The district of Bussatte takes its name from the Low Latin buxetta / buxettum which means "place planted with boxwood" equivalent to Boissay in the langue d'oïl.
- The district of l'Houmeau meaning "small elm" or "abalone". The term is probably derived from Low Latin ulmellum.
- Sillac probably comes from Low Latin Sīliācum meaning that the village was built around the property (suffix -ācum) of a Gallo-Roman named Sīlius.

== History ==
=== Antiquity ===
The history of the city is not very well known before the Roman period: it is simply known that the plateau was occupied by an oppidum, traces of which were found during excavations in the Saint-Martial cemetery under the name Iculisma. Its currency was Lemovice.

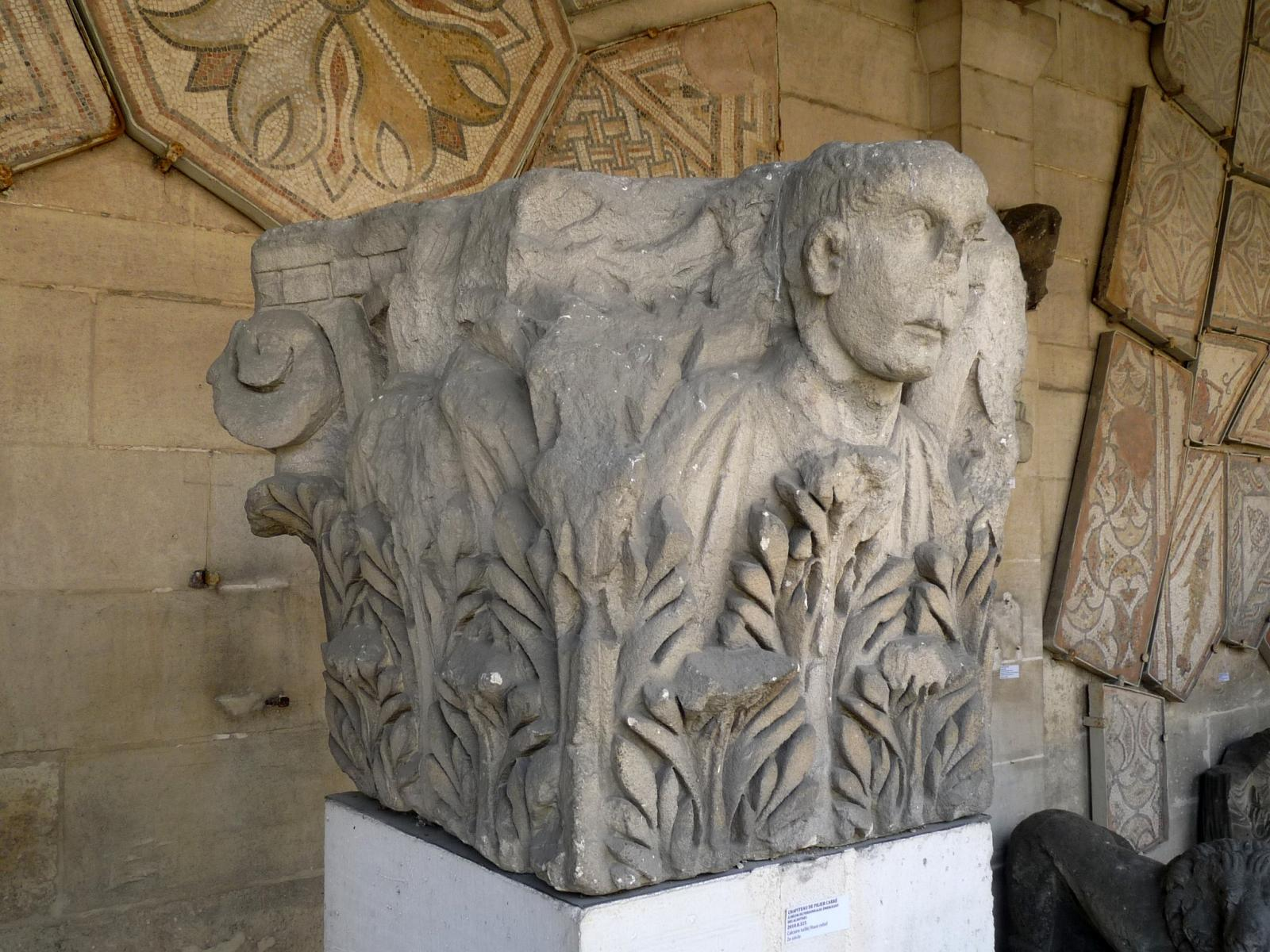
A capital from the 2nd century discovered in 1888 on the Rue des Halles

The town was not located on major roads and was considered by the poet Ausonius as a small town. No Roman monuments have been found but it benefited from the Pax Romana and from trade on the river. The town had a prosperous period at the end of the Roman Empire. The rocky promontory overlooking the Charente 80 m (260 ft) high and over the Anguienne 60 m (200 ft) high formed a strategic position. It was raised to the rank of capital of civitas (at the end of the 3rd or 4th centuries) and the first fortress dates from the end of the Roman Empire. The rampart called Bas-Empire which surrounds 27 hectares of land was maintained until the 13th century. The network of Roman roads were then reorganized to link the town with the surrounding cities of Bordeaux, Saintes, Poitiers, Limoges, and Périgueux.

The city of Haut-Empire remained unknown for a long time. Recent excavations have provided details on the power of the Roman city. A well dug in an early era shows that the water table was very high. A large thermal spa complex was found under the courthouse which is usually related to water supplied through an aqueduct.

The first bishop of Angoulême was Saint Ausone of Angoulême in the 3rd century. The administrative importance of the city was strengthened by the implementation of a County in the 6th century with Turpion (or Turpin) (839–863), adviser to Charles the Bald. However, the town was always attached to the various kingdoms of Aquitaine and the end of antiquity for the city was in 768, when Pepin the Short defeated Hunald II and linked it to the Frankish kingdom. In June 2019, archeologists discovered a prehistoric stone with an engraving of a horse and other animals near Angoulême station. The Palaeolithic stone plate is estimated to be about 12,000 years old.

=== Middle Ages ===
Flag of the ancient province of Angoumois

When held by the Visigoths, the city followed the Arian version of Christianity and was besieged for the first time by Clovis in 507 after Vouillé then taken in 508; "miraculously" according to Gregory of Tours and Ademar of Chabannes.

During the battle, however, Clovis was seriously wounded in the leg - probably a fracture. The fact is reported by tradition and on a wall of a tower from the 2nd century a leg is carved called the "leg of Clovis".

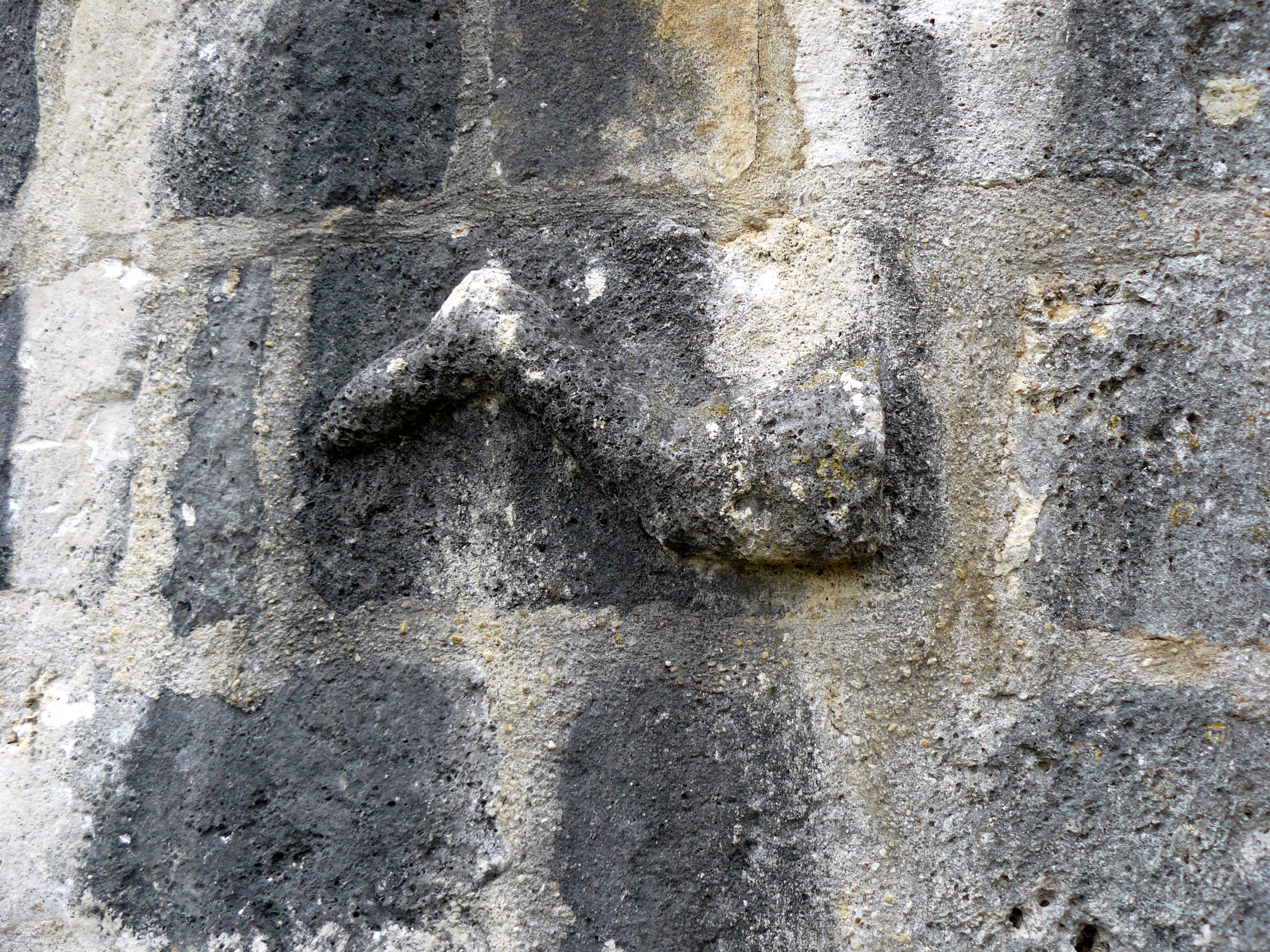
The Leg of Clovis

During his stay in Angoulême, after putting the garrison to the sword, Clovis pulled down the old Visigothic cathedral dedicated to Saint-Saturnin to build a new one bearing the name of Saint-Pierre. All that remains of the original building are two carved marble capitals that frame the bay of the axis in the apse of the present cathedral.

In the 7th century Saint Cybard stayed secluded in a cave beneath the extension to the north wall of Angoulême called Green Garden which caused the creation of the first abbey: the Abbey of Saint-Cybard, then created the first abbey for women: the Abbey of Saint-Ausone where the tomb of the first bishop of the city is located.

In 848 Angoulême was sacked by the Viking chief Hastein. In 896 or 930 the city suffered another attack from invading Vikings but this time the Vikings faced an effective resistance. Guillaume I, third Count of Angoulême, at the head of his troops made them surrender in a decisive battle. During this engagement, he split open to the waist Stonius, the Norman chief, with a massive blow together with his helmet and breastplate.

It was this feat that earned him the name Taillefer, which was borne by all his descendants until Isabella of Angoulême who was also known as Isabelle Taillefer, the wife of King John of England. The title was withdrawn from the descendants on more than one occasion by Richard Coeur-de-Lion then the title passed to King John of England at the time of his marriage to Isabella of Angoulême, daughter of Count Aymer of Angoulême. After becoming a widow, Isabella subsequently married Hugh X of Lusignan in 1220, and the title was passed to the Lusignan family, counts of Marche. On the death of Hugh XIII in 1302 without issue, the County of Angoulême passed his possessions to the crown of France.

In 1236 Jewish communities in Anjou and Poitou, particularly Bordeaux and Angoulême were attacked by crusaders. 500 Jews chose conversion and over 3000 were massacred. Pope Gregory IX, who originally had called the crusade, was outraged about this brutality and criticized the clergy for not preventing it.

From the 10th to the 13th centuries the counts of Angoulême, the Taillefer, then the Lusignan strengthened the defences of the city and widened it to encompass the district of Saint-Martial. In 1110, Bishop Girard II ordered the construction of the present cathedral.

=== The commune charter ===
On 18 May 1204 a charter was signed by King John of England to make official the creation of the commune of Angoulême. The King "grants to residents of Angoulême to keep the freedoms and customs of their fair city and defend their possessions and rights". The city celebrated their 800th anniversary throughout 2004.

=== The Hundred Years War ===
In 1360 the city, like all of Angoumois, passed into the hands of the Plantagenet English with the Treaty of Brétigny. From 16 to 22 October 1361, John Chandos, Lieutenant of King Edward III of England and the Constable of Aquitaine responsible for implementing the Treaty particularly in Angoumois, took possession of the city, its castles, and the "mostier" (monastery) of Saint-Pierre. He received oaths of allegiance to the King of England from the main personalities of the city.

The English were, however, expelled in 1373 by the troops of Charles V who granted the town numerous privileges. The County of Angoulême was given to Louis d'Orléans who was the brother of King Charles VI in 1394 and it then passed to his son Jean d'Orléans (1400–1467), the grandfather of Marguerite de Navarre and François I. The Good Count Jean of Angoulême greatly expanded the County castle after his return from English captivity in the middle of the 15th century.

=== The modern era ===
Angoulême, the seat of the County of Angoumois, came into the possession of a branch of the family of Valois from which came François I, King of France from 1515 to 1547 who was born in Cognac in 1494. In 1524, the Italian navigator Giovanni da Verrazzano returned from the Indies. He told François I he had discovered a new territory that he named New Angoulême in his honour. This area later became New Amsterdam then New York.

The duchy, now crown land, thereafter was passed on within the ruling house of France. One of its holders was Charles of Valois, the "natural" (illegitimate) son of Charles IX. The last duke of Angoulême was Louis-Antoine (died 1844), eldest son of Charles X of France.

John Calvin, the promoter of Protestantism and friend of Jean du Tillet the archdeacon of Angoulême, was forced to flee Paris in 1533 and took refuge in Angoulême in the caves of Rochecorail at Trois-Palis. He wrote some of his Institutes of the Christian Religion there which first edition was published in Latin in Basel in 1536.

Angoulême was affected by the Revolt of the Pitauds peasant revolt: in 1541, the gabelle (salt tax) was imposed on Saintonge and Angoumois. These provinces did not pay the tax on salt. The revolt broke out around Angoulême and farmers from the surrounding countryside took the city in July 1548

During the first wars of religion the city took up arms: it was reconquered in 1563 by Montpensier. In 1565, Charles IX passed through the city during his royal tour of France (1564–1566) accompanied by the court. In October 1568 the city was taken by the Protestants under Coligny.

Henry III was, in his infancy, the Duke of Angoulême. He left an unflattering description: "The streets of Engolesme are twisted, houses are disordered, the walls built out of various kinds of masonry which show that it was built several times and often taken and ruined"

In 1588, the mayor of Angoulême, François Normand Lord of Puygrelier, was ordered by Henri III to arrest the Duke of Épernon, governor of Angoumois. He led the assault, was repelled, and died on 10 August 1588.

In 1619, Marie de Médicis escaped and was received by the Duke of Épernon, governor of Angoumois. At that time the castle was the residence of the governors.

=== French Revolution ===
During the French Revolution the city was called Mountagne-Charente. The first tree of liberty was planted on 5 July 1792.

=== World War II ===
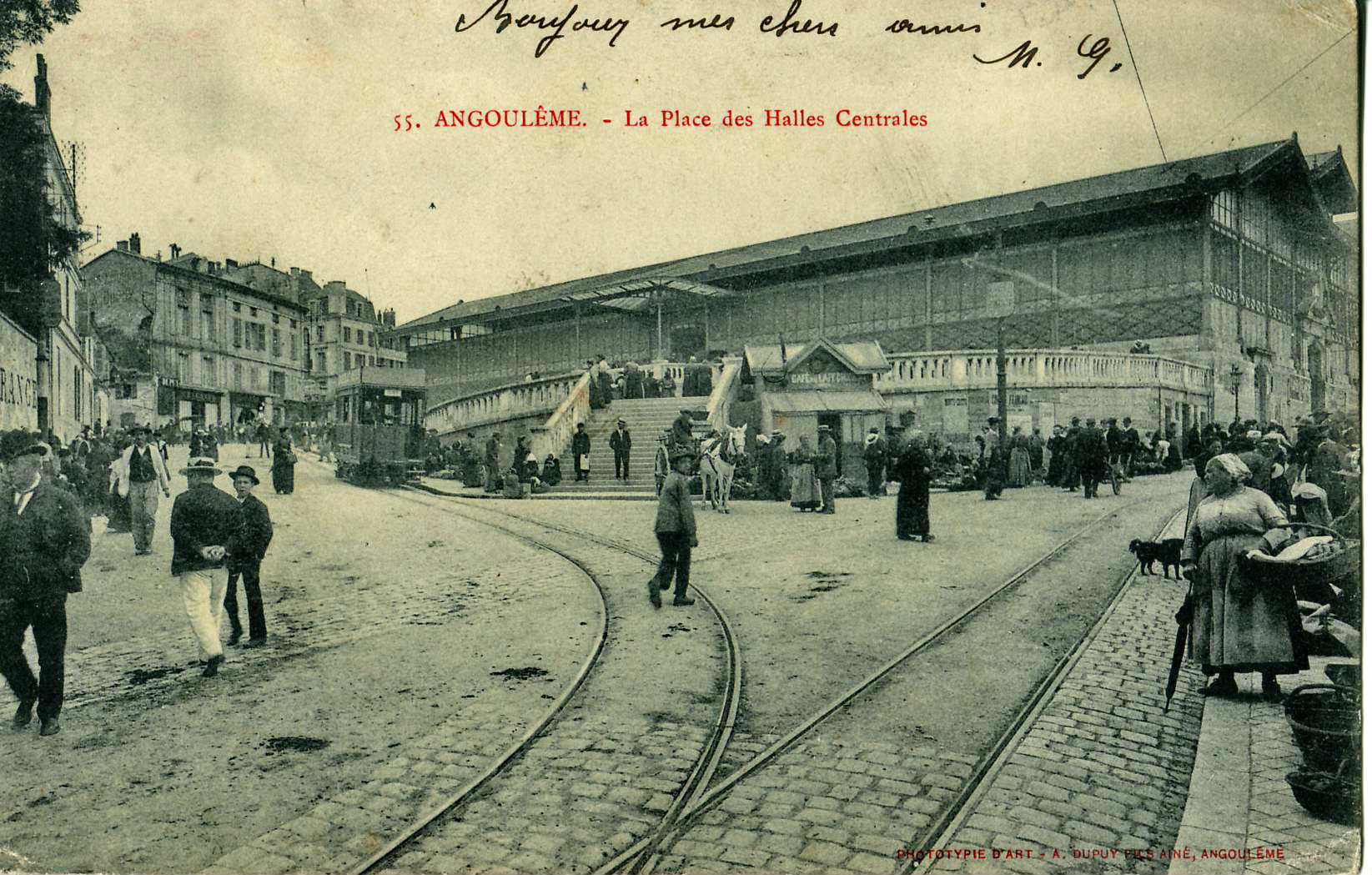
The network of Tramway of Angoulême served the city from 1900 to 1935. Seen here is a carriage at the Place des Halles before the First World War.

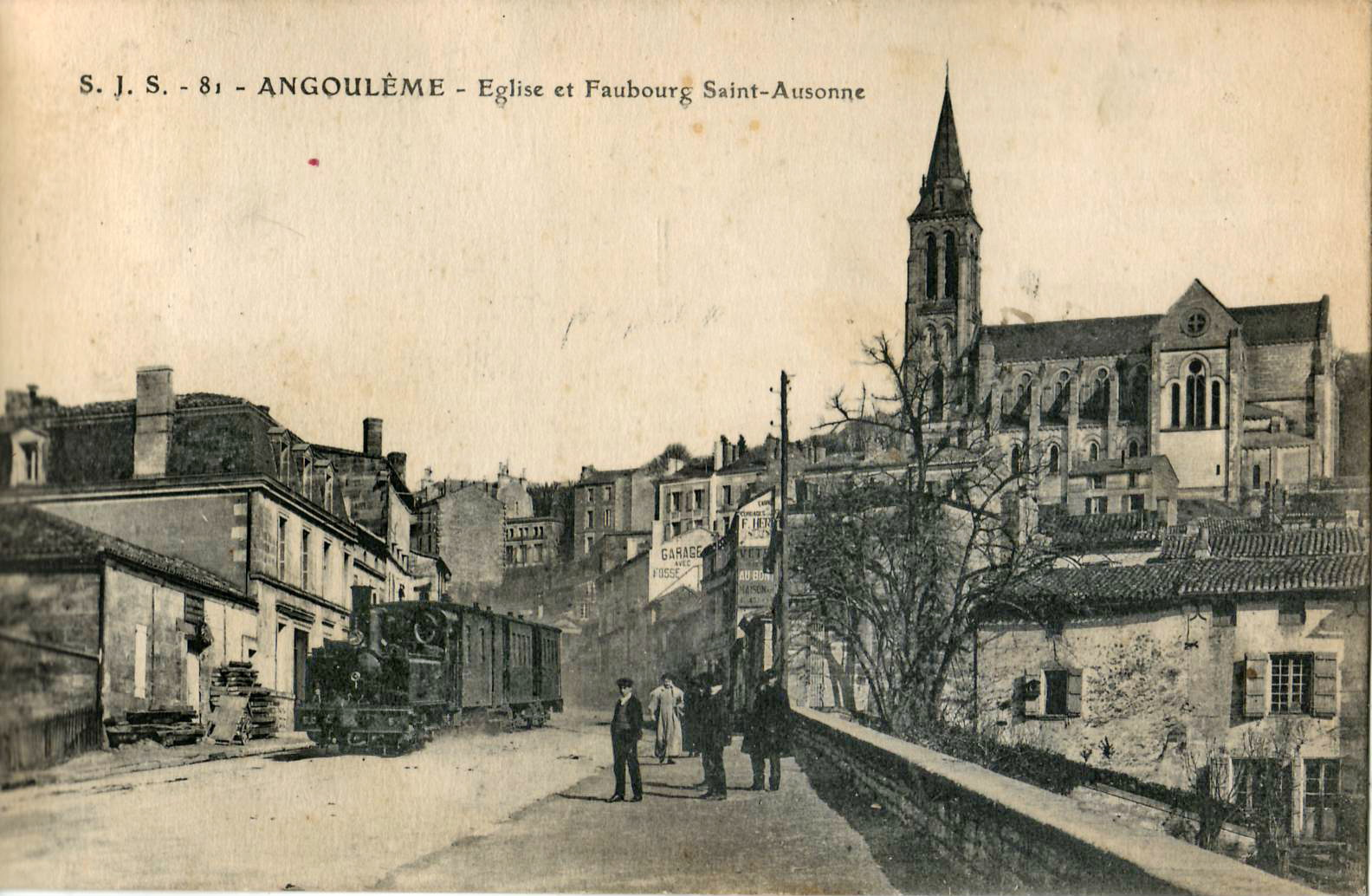
The city was also the terminus of a metre-gauge light railway called the Chemins de fer économiques des Charentes to Chalais which ran from 1910 to 1948.

On 24 June 1940, the 2nd Verfügungstruppe division (special intervention troops) Das Reich supported by other units of the Wehrmacht arrived in Angoulême. These troops took prisoners and neutralized the many refugee French soldiers in the city. Their number is estimated between 10 and 20 thousand. They were released in the following days.

The Das Reich division, which became tragically famous in 1944 during the Battle of Normandy, continued their "lightning war" by quickly moving to the Spanish border to quickly set the line of demarkation to cut France in two. Angoulême was located in the occupied zone under German authority and was the seat of the Feld Kommandatur. The border with the free zone, colloquially called the zone nono (non-occupied) passed about 20 km (12 mi) east of Angoulême through the Forest of Braconne and split the department in two.

On 20 August 1940 a convoy of Spanish Republicans were sent from Angoulême: convoy 927. This was the first convoy of the history of Deportation in Europe. Men over the age of 13 were sent to the Mauthausen camp where very few survived; women and children were sent to Franco. These refugees were gathered in camps of "Combe aux Loups" at Ruelle-sur-Touvre and "Alliers" in Angoulême. It also served as a concentration camp for Gypsies until June 1946.

On 21 October 1941 the young Gontran Labrégère, who tried with his friend Jean Pierre Rivière to set fire to a train carrying straw and munitions in Angoulême railway station, was shot by the occupiers. This was the first of a long list of 98 resistance fighters or hostages from Charente. In 1942, Mayor Guillon was dismissed and accused of belonging to an organisation outlawed by the Vichy regime. He was replaced by a notable industrialist, Pallas.

On 8 October 1942, 387 people of Jewish origin were arrested and deported to Auschwitz. Only eight of them ever returned. On 19 March 1944 allied bombing caused widespread damage and one casualty at the National Explosives factory. On 15 June and 14 August 1944, the railway station was the target of American Flying Fortresses that dumped a carpet of bombs with little damage to the Germans but killing 242 civilians, destroying 400 houses, and caused 5,000 disaster victims in l'Éperon, l'Houmeau, Madeleine, and Grand-Font districts. At the end of August 1944, the Elster column, which was composed of the remains of various German units and the Indische Legion, passed through the city without incident and withdrew.

Various units of FFI from the department and reinforcements from Dordogne then began the encirclement of the city. On the evening of 31 August an attack was launched, putting to flight the remnants of the German garrison. They did not have an opportunity to reorganize the defence of the city using the numerous and formidable fortifications erected for this purpose. On the night of 31 August to 1 September, the city was liberated and a Liberation Committee with a new prefect was installed. This attack, however, resulted in 51 casualties among the different units involved: Maquis de Bir Hacheim, Groupe Soleil, SSS (Special Section for Sabotage), etc.

A museum in the commune is devoted to the Resistance and the deportations of Jewish and political prisoners. A statue near the station commemorates the deportations to the concentration camps. The survivors of Operation Frankton, notable for their daring raid by canoe on the German U-boat base at Bordeaux, made their escape across country to a safe house at Ruffec just north of Angoulême. This is now the site of a shop featuring British goods. The Monument to the Resistance is in Chasseneuil to the east.

=== Postwar history ===
After the war, the city underwent a major expansion of its suburbs. First Grand Font and Bel-Air, following the MRU reconstruction program for war damage of the area around the station which was bombed in 1944. Then in the 1960s the districts of Basseau (ZAC) and the Grande-Garenne were built and then there was the creation of Priority Urban Zones (ZUPs) at Ma Campagne in the 1970s.

Gradually industries moved into more spacious industrial zones created in the peripheral communes between 1959 and 1975:

- Sillac-Rabion (1959)
- les Agriers (1964)
- ZI No. 3: Gond-Pontouvre and L'Isle-d'Espagnac (1967)
- Nersac (early 1970s)
- Combe at Saint-Yrieix (1980)

Urbanisation also affected the peripheral communes with housing estates at Soyaux and Ruelle-sur-Touvre and the agglomeration became one of the largest cities in the south-west.

In 1972, the city signed a "pilot city" contract with the State (DATAR, represented by Albin Chalandon), which allowed the city to make large scale public works - e.g. the small ring road (bridge and Rue Saint-Antoine, Boulevard Bretagne, Tunnel of Gâtine) penetrating Ma Campagne and called the way to Europe, the ZUPs at Ma Campagne, the Saint-Martial town centre, underground parking at Bouillaud and Saint-Martial, Montauzier indoor swimming pools at Ma Campagne, a pedestrianized street, a one-way traffic plan with computerized management of traffic lights (Angoulême is one of the first cities in France with Bordeaux which has the Gertrude computerized system called Philibert in Angoulême), STGA urban transport (ten routes with flexible buses), development of Bouillaud square, Conservatory of Music.

In 1989, after defeat in the municipal elections, the PS deputy mayor, Jean-Michel Boucheron left a hole of 164 million francs in the finances of the city and a debt of 1.2 billion francs. This deficit has burdened the finances of the city and long served as justification for the non-involvement in the completion of public works.

The small ring road (the southwest quarter - i.e. the Aquitaine Boulevard, a second bridge over the Charente, and the connection to the way of Europe) was completed in 1995.

Following the construction of the Nautilis swimming complex at Saint-Yrieix by the urban community, the town of Angoulême closed three swimming pools in 2001 (Montauzier, Ma Campagne and the Bourgines summer pool).

=== Heraldry ===
Arms of Angoulême	Accompanying the devise: "FORTITUDO MEA CIVIUM FIDES" meaning "My strength is in the loyalty of my citizens" (The same device as Périgueux). Blazon: Azure, a castle with open arch flanked by two towers all of argent masoned and windowed in sable surmounted by a fleur-de-lis of Or, also surmounted by a marquis coronet the same.

Development of the coat of arms

- The first known blazon was: Azure Semé-de-lis of Or, a city gate with two towers of argent debruised by the whole.
- Under Philip V in 1317: The Two Towers became three.
- Under Charles VI in 1381 are: Azure Semé-de-lis of Or, a bend compony of Argent and Or debruised by the whole for brisure. The door at tower three encloses an outdoor ornament.
- Under Charles VII in 1452 the brisure changes for: a label of three points, with the middle pointed.
- In the 16th century, the door with two towers reappears surmounted by a fleur de lys of gold.
- In 1850 a star replaced the fleur de lys which reappeared in 1855.
- At an unknown date the crown was added.

== Administration ==
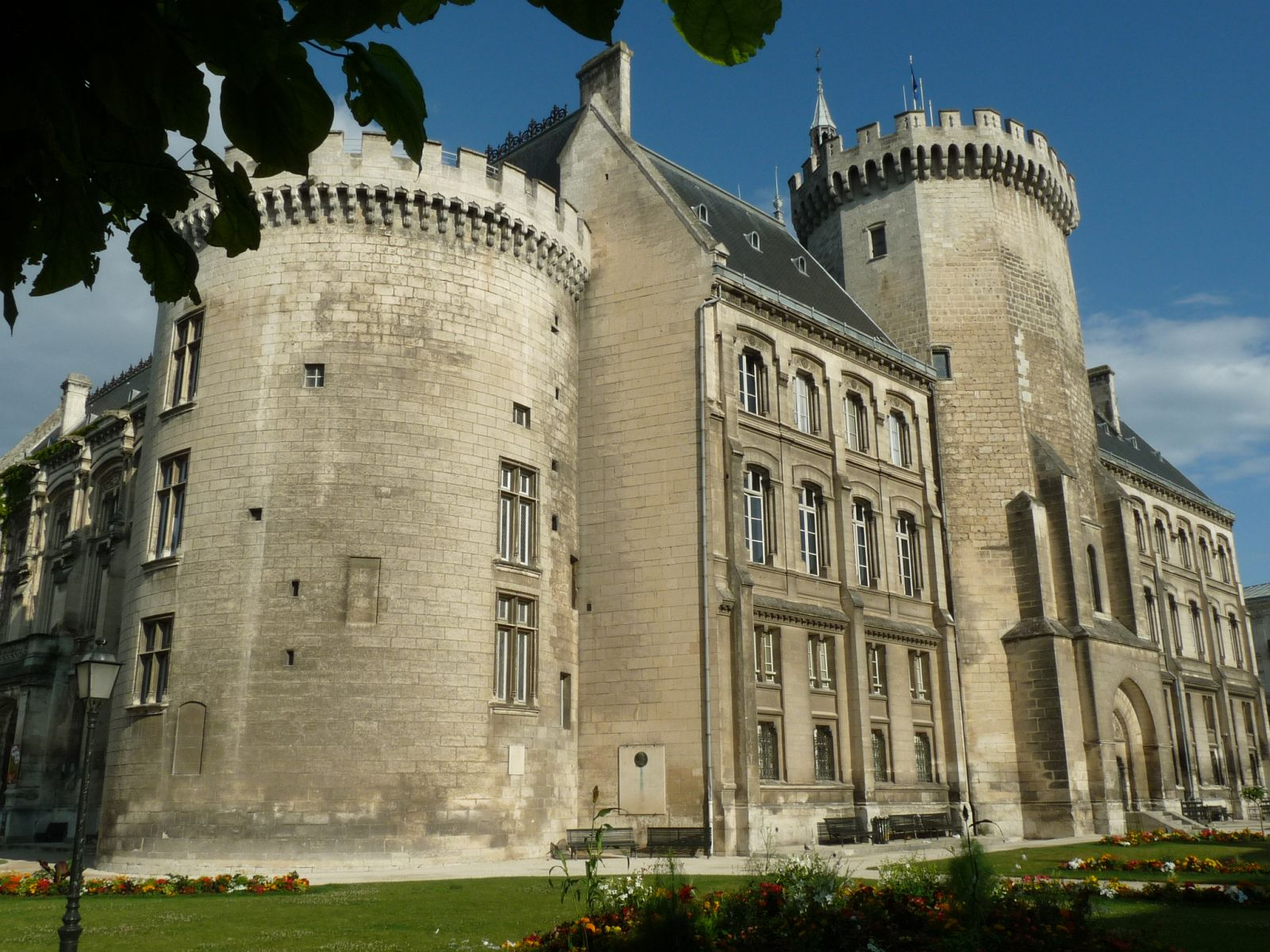
City Hall

=== Municipality ===
List of mayors of Angoulême under the Ancien Régime

From	To	Name
1212		Barthélémy du Puy
1215		Pierre Guillaume
1218		Hélie d'Aurifont
1381	1382	Jehan Teinturier
1390	1392	Jehan Prevost
1393		Brugier
1396	1399	Bernard de Jambes
1397		Cumon
1399		Mangot Prevost
1400		Jehan Prevost
1402		Hélie Martin
1410		Gentil
1415		Baron
1420		Pelletan
1429		de Lage
1431		Seguin
1435		Fourreau
1437		Jehan Musnier
1438		Arnauld Mat
1439		de Lisee
1443	1444	Pierre Dormois
1445	1446	Arnauld Mat
1446	1447	Jehan Pelletan
1453		Faure
1457		Héliot Martin
1458		Jehan du Mayne
1460		Pierre du Sou
1461		Guillaume Prevost
1462		Perrinet de la Combe
1463		Jehan Maqueau
1464		Penot de la Combe
1465		Perrinet de la Combe
1466		Penot Seguin
1467		Penot de la Combe
1468		Hélie Martin
1469		Perrinet de la Combe
1470		Penot de la Combe
1471		Guillaume Prevost
1472		Penot Seguin
1473		Perrinet du Sou
1474		Penot de la Combe
1475		Perrinet de la Combe
1476		Jehan du Mayne
1477		Pierre du Sou
1478		Penot de la Combe
1479		Jacques Bareau
1480	1481	Philippe de la Combe
1482		Penot de la Combe
1482	1483	Michel Montgeon
1483		Jacques Bareau
1484	1485	Guillaume Brugier
1486	1487	Jacques Bareau
1488		Philippe de la Combe
1489		Jehan Fourreau
1490		Hélie Debresme
1491		Bernard Seguyn
1491	1492	Jehan du Mayne
1492		Jehan de Lousmelet
1493	1494	André de Bar
1495	1498	Hélie Seguin
1498	1499	Penot du Mayne
1499	1500	Georges Cimitiere
1500		Anthoyne Gentilz
1501		Regnault Caluau
1502	1503	Hélie du Tillet
1504		Hélie de Lagear
1505		Cibard Couillard
1506	1507	Pierre de La Place
1509	1510	Guillaume Caluau
1511		Cibard Couillard
1512		Pierre de La Combe
1513		Charles Odeau
1514	1515	Charles de Lousmellet
1516		Etienne Rousseau
1517	1518	Caluau
1519		Pierre Boessot
1520	1522	Bernard de Marcilhac
1523		Jehan de Paris
1524		Laurent Journault
1528		Jacques de Lesmerie
1529		Martial Lizee
1530		Guillaume Caluau
1533		Pierre Pascauld
1534		Guillaume Ruspide
1535		Loys Estivalle
1536		Jean Montgeon
1537		Georges Ruspide
1538		François Rouhault
1539		Simon Moreau
1540		François de Couillault
1541		Ythier Jullien
1543		Jean Blanchard
1544		Jean de Paris
1545		Guillaume Ruffier
1546		Jean Blanchard
1547		Aymar Le Coq
1548		Poirier
1549		Simon Moreau
1550		Guillaume de La Combe
1551	1552	François de Couillard
1553		François Terrasson
1554	1555	Guillaume Rousseau
1556	1557	Jean Desmoulins
1558		Jean Ruffier
1559	1560	Hélie Dexmier
1561		Hélie de La Place
1562		Jean Paulte
1563		Hélie Baiol
1563		François de La Combe
1564		Michel Constantin
1565		François de La Combe
1566		Michel Constantin
1567		François de La Combe
1568		Jean Girard
1569		Etienne Pontenier
1570		Jean Paulte
1571		Nicolas Ythier
1572		François de Voyon
1573		Mathurin Martin
1574	1577	Jean Pommaret
1578		François Redond
1579		Pierre Gandillaud
1580		Pierre Terrasson
1581	1582	Pierre Bouton
1583		Louis de Lesmerie
1585		Hélie Laisne
1586		Denys Chappiteau
1587		Guymarc Bourgoing
1588		François Normand de Puygrelier
1589		Etienne Villoutreys
1590		Hélie Laisne
1591		Jacques Lemercier
1592	1593	François Le Meusnier
1594		Cybard Laisne
1595		Jean Nesmond
1596		Pierre Terrasson
1597		Jean Pommaret
1598	1599	Jacques Le Mercier
1600		François Le Meusnier
1601		Antoine Moreau
1602		Jean du Fosse
1603		Jacques de Villoutreys
1604		Jean de Paris
1605		Charles Raoul
1606		François Desruaux
1607	1608	François Ruffier
1609	1610	Jacques Le Meusnier
1611		Jean Nesmond
1612		Guillaume Guez de Balzac
1613		François Desruaux
1614	1616	Jacques Le Meusnier
1617	1619	Jean Guerin
1620		Jean de Paris
1621		François Desruaux
1622		Jacques Le Meusnier
1623		Antoine Gandillaud
1624		Pierre Desforges
1625	1626	Guillaume Lambert
1627		François Dufosse
1628		Pierre Bareau
1629		Jean de Paris
1630		Jean Guerin
1631		Abraham Jameu
1632	1633	Paul Thomas
1634	1635	Jean Souchet
1636	1637	Hélie Levequot
1638		Hélie Houlier
1639	1640	Philippe Arnold
1641	1642	Jean Boisson
1643	1644	Antoine Racault
1645	1646	François Normand de Puygrelier
1647		François Pommet
1648	1649	Jean Lambert
1650	1651	Jean Guymard
1652		Pierre Briant
1653	1654	François Normand de Puygrelier
1655		Philippe Arnaud
1656		Jean Preverauld
1657	1658	Jean Gilibert
1659		Samuel Paquet
1660		Abraham de La Farge
1662		Jean du Thiers
1664	1666	Jean de l'Etoile
1667	1669	Jacques Morin
1670		François Castin
1673		François Abraham de Guips
1676		Louis de Chazeau
1679		François Nadaud
1682	1683	Jean Arnauld
1686		Jean Cadiot de Pontenier
1689		Jean Louis Guitton
1692		Jean Fe
1693		Etienne Cherade
1708		Mesnard de Laumont
1718		Jean Gervais
1721		Pierre Arnauld
1723		Henri Rambaud
1724		François Arnauld
1728		Jean Mesnard
1731		Louis Cosson
1738		Jean Valteau
1741		Elie-Philippe Maulde
1744		Pierre de Sarlande
1747		Léonard du Tillet
1754		Pierre de Labatud
1757		Claude Tremeau
1760		Noël Limousin
1765		Dassier
1766		Dumas
1768		François Bourdage
1771		Chaigneau de La Graviere
1773		Pierre Marchais de La Berge
1790		Jean Valleteau de Chabrefy
1790		Perier de Gurat

List of mayors of Angoulême from the French Revolution to 1944

From	To	Name	Party	Position
1791		Louis Desbrandes		
1792		André Resnier		
1793		Henry		
1793		Michel Marvaud-Baudet		
1793		Louis Desbrandes		
1794		Michel Marvaud-Baudet		
1795		Louis Desbrandes		
1795		Louis Joseph Trion Montalembert		
1795		Abraham François Robin Puynege		
1795		Michel Marvaud-Baudet		
1796		Jean Auguste Dervaud		
1797		Pierre Mallet		
1797		François Blandeau		
1800		Etienne Souchet		
1804		Descravayat de Belat		
1813		Pierre Lambert des Andreaux		
1815		Jean-Baptiste Marchadier		
1816		Pierre Lambert des Andreaux		
1816		Pierre Jean Thevet		
1825		Eutrope Alexis de Chasteignier		
1830		Ganivet		
1830		Laurent Sazerac de Forge		
1830		Philippe Pierre de Lambert		
1833		Henri Bellamy		
1835		Alexis Gellibert		
1837		Paul Joseph Normand de La Tranchade		
1841		Pierre Vallier		
1843		Zadig Rivaud		
1848		Antony Cheneuzac		
1849		Paul Joseph Normand de La Tranchade		
1855		Edmond Thomas		
1855		François Léon Bourrut-Duvivier		
1864		Laurent Paul Sazerac de Forge		
1870		Jean Marrot		
1874		Pierre Eugène Decescaud		
1875		Jean Hippolyte Broquisse		
1879		Jean Marrot		
1881		Henri Bellamy		
1888		Jean Marrot		
1894		Auguste Mullac		
1896		Jean Donzole		
1900		Auguste Mulac		
1919		Jean Texier		
1925		Gustave Guillon		
1941	1944	Ariste Pallas		

List of Successive Mayors since 1944

From	To	Name	Party	Position
1944	1945	Antoine Rougerie		
1945	1947	Antonin Denis		
1947	1955	Roger Baudrin		
1955	1958	Henri Thébault	CNI	MP for Charente
1958	1959	Raoul Boucheron		
1959	1970	Henri Thébault	CNI	
1970	1977	Roland Chiron	CNI	Lawyer
1977	1989	Jean-Michel Boucheron	PS	Professor, MP
1989	1997	Georges Chavanes	UDF	Industrialist, MP, Minister
1997	2008	Philippe Mottet	UMP	University Professor, Regional Councillor
2008	2014	Philippe Lavaud	PS	Professor
2014	2026	Xavier Bonnefont	UMP	

=== Cantons ===
Angoulême is divided over three cantons:

- Angoulême-1, which comprises the commune of Fléac and part of Angoulême
- Angoulême-2, which comprises the commune of L'Isle-d'Espagnac and part of Angoulême
- Angoulême-3, which comprises the commune of Soyaux and part of Angoulême

=== Intercommunality ===
The Urban Community of Greater Angoulême or Grand Angoulême includes 16 communes: Angoulême, Fleac, Gond-Pontouvre, La Couronne, Linars, L'Isle-d'Espagnac, Magnac-sur-Touvre, Mornac, Nersac, Puymoyen, Ruelle-sur-Touvre, Saint-Michel, Saint-Saturnin, Saint-Yrieix-sur-Charente, Soyaux, and Touvre.

The population of the conurbation was 103,501 inhabitants in 2006 (102,368 in 1999).

=== Budget and taxation ===
Taxation is at a rate of 40.20% on buildings, 71.94% on undeveloped land, and 18.43% for the housing tax (2007 figures).

The urban community levies 19.20% business tax.

=== Urban development ===
The Champ de Mars is the central square of the city and has had an underground shopping arcade since September 2007.

The eastern ring road was opened in 2004 (2010 for the final section) which opened up several districts. The deviation of the N10 which has bypassed the city since 1973 has formed a western ring road since 2004 when the initial Fléac-Linars project was abandoned.

Rehabilitation operations for collective housing are underway as part of the government Operation for Urban Renewal. The districts of Grande Garenne, Basseau and Ma Campagne were combined in a program of urban regeneration.

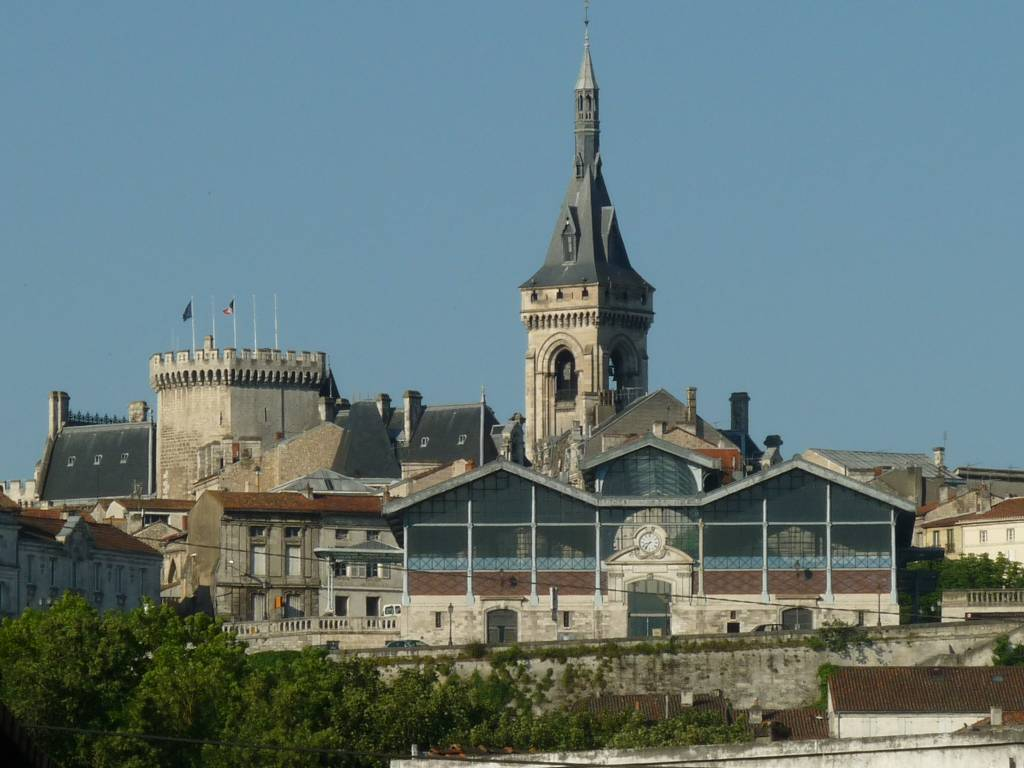
The historic centre with the city hall and the market

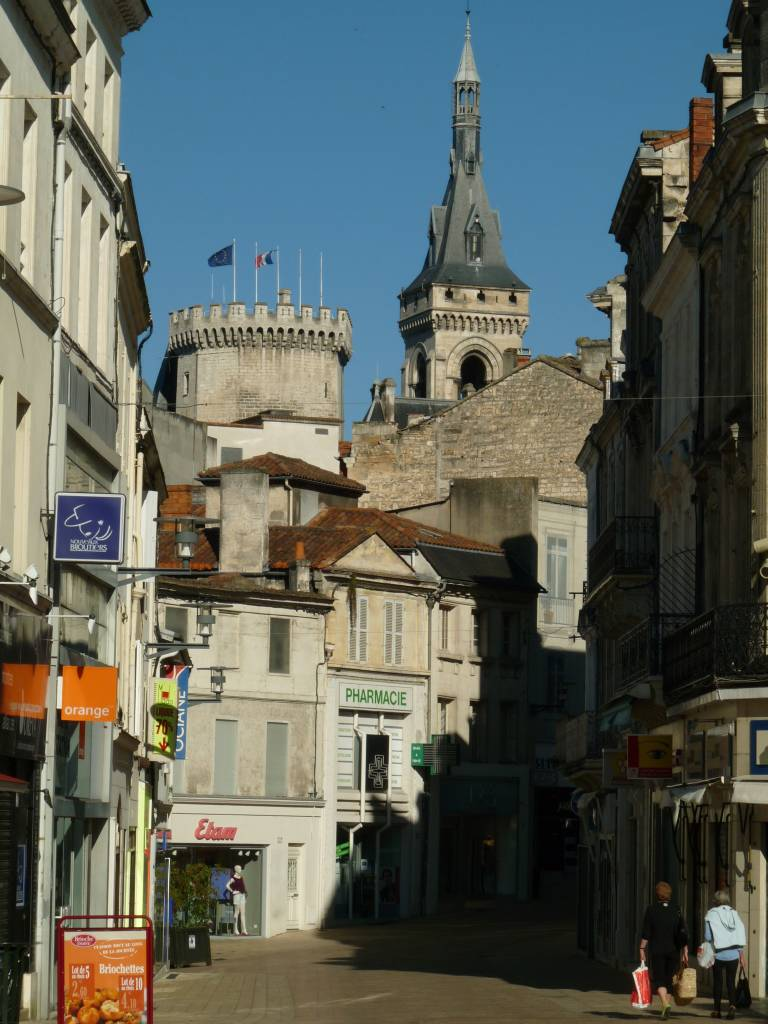
Pedestrian shopping area in the centre

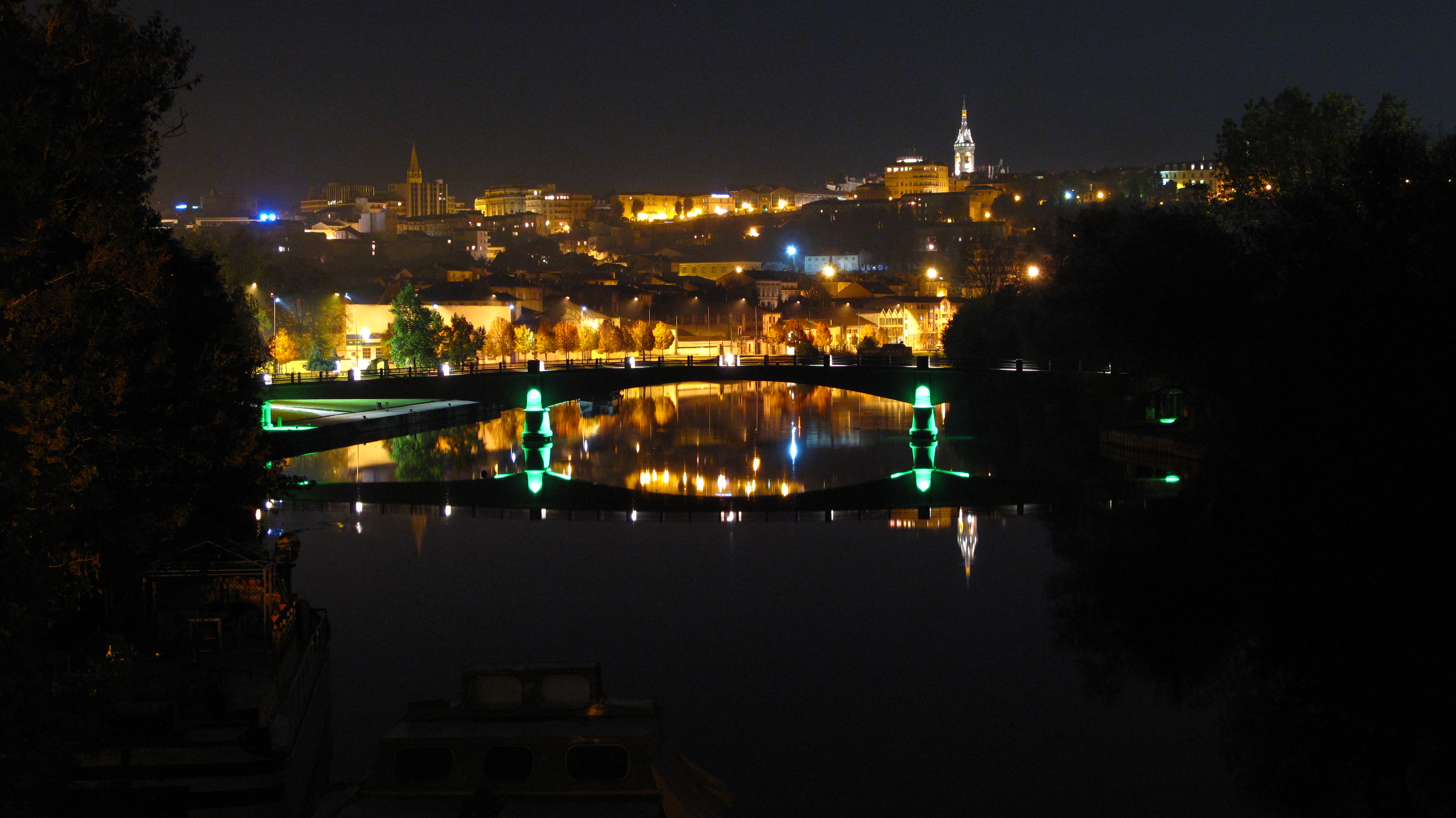
The port of l'Houmeau and, in the background, the town centre of Angoulême

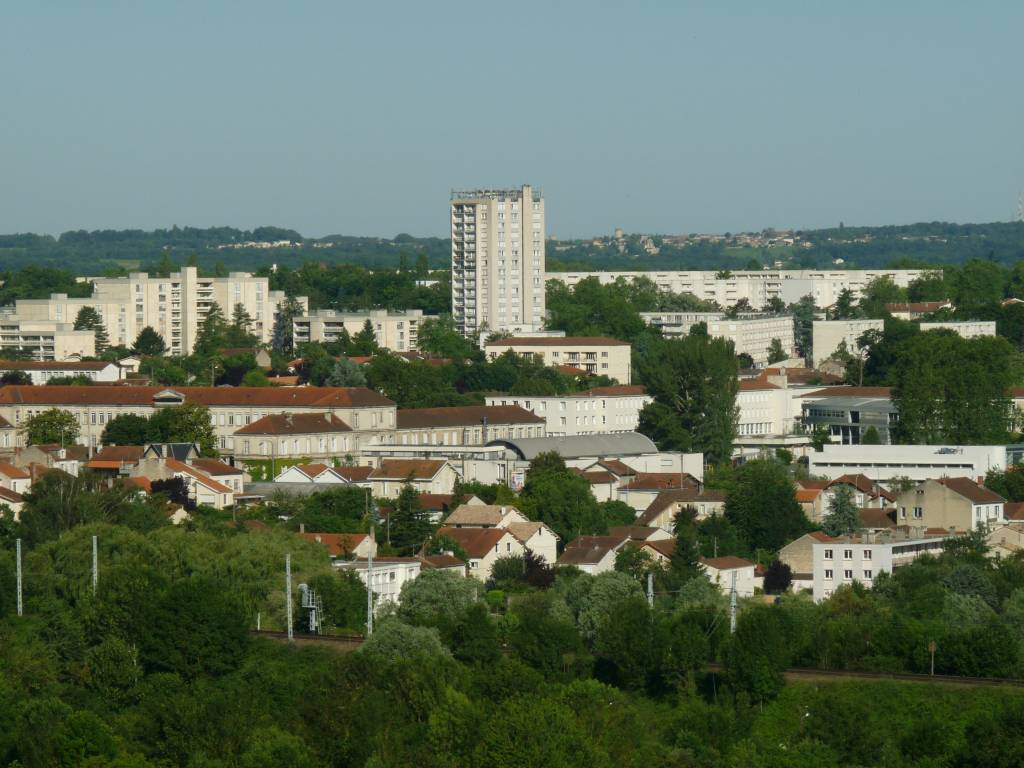
District of Grande-Garenne

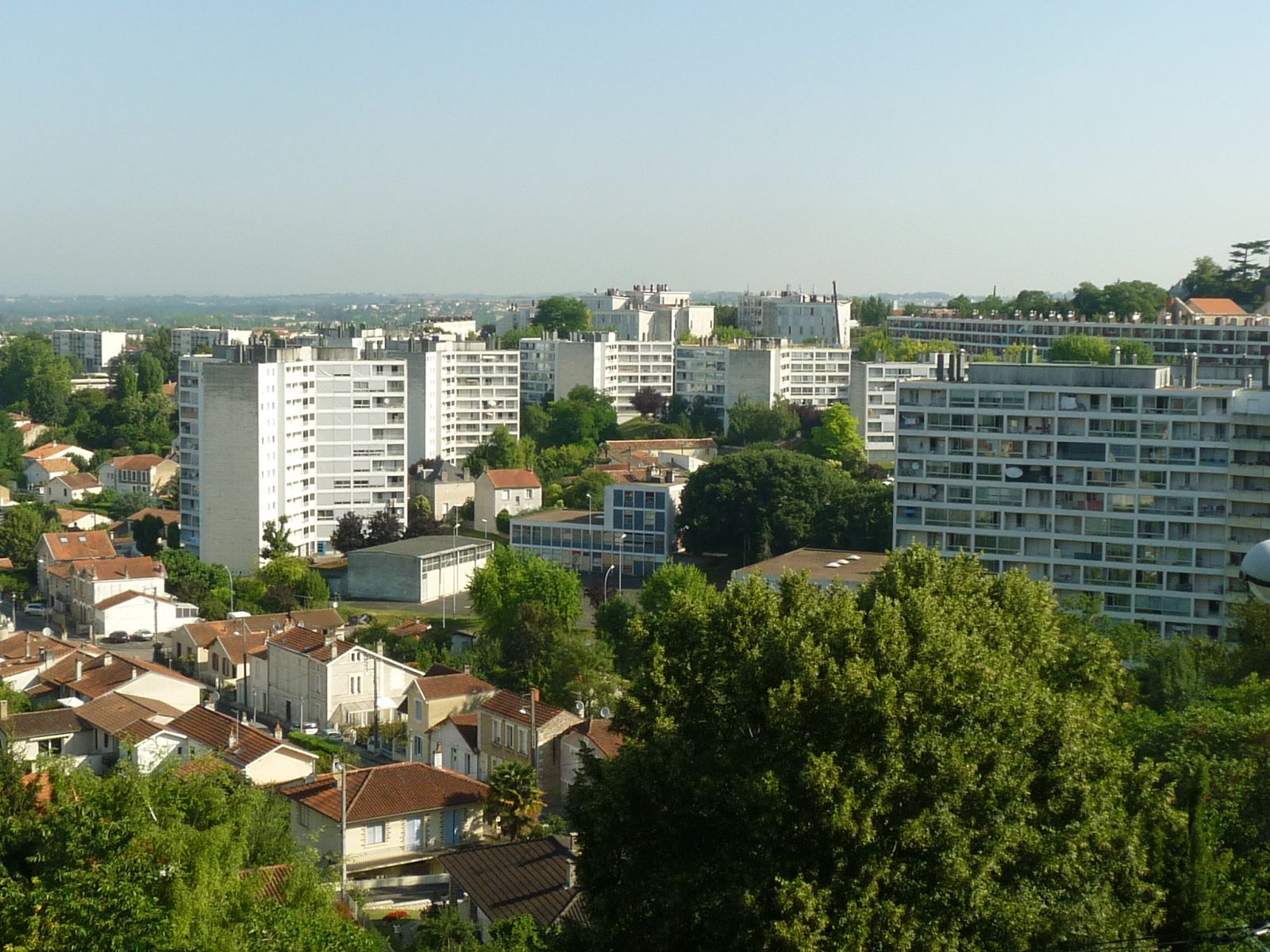
District of Grand-Font

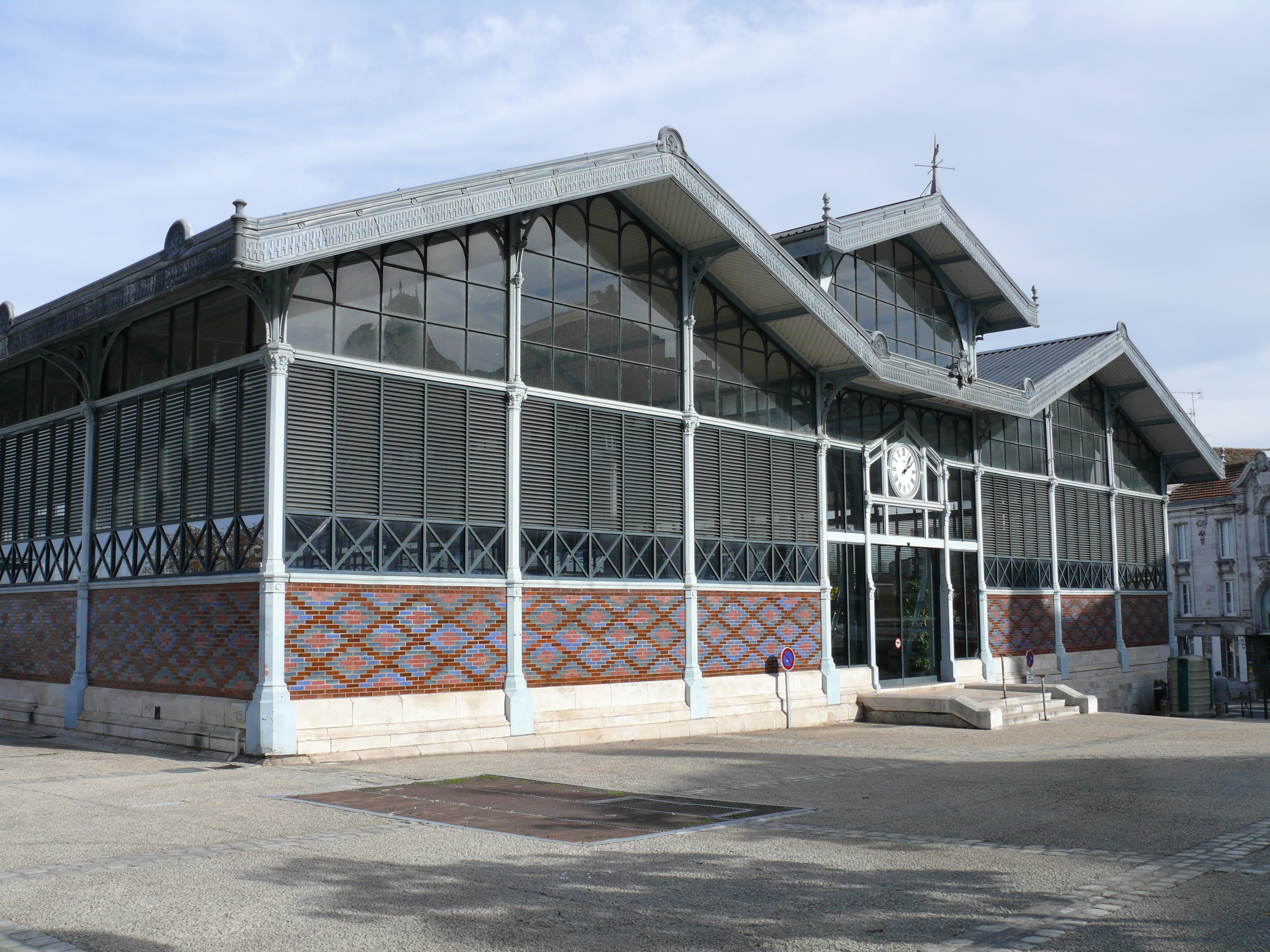
Les Halles

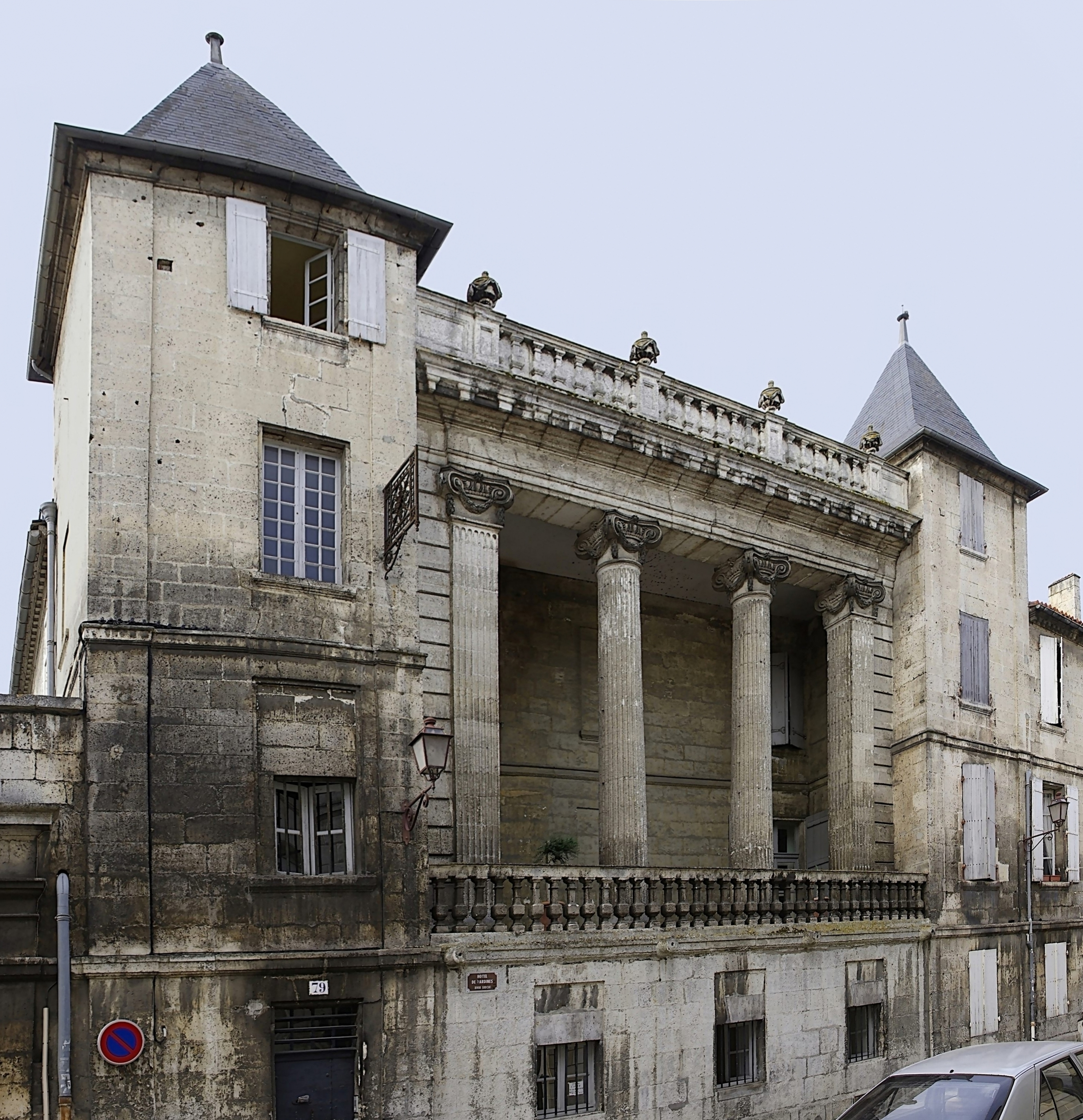
The Bardines Hotel

=== Movies and TV series shot in Angoulême ===
- Blanche and Marie by Jacques Renard with Miou-Miou and Sandrine Bonnaire, shot in Angoulême and Rouillac, released in 1985
- The Child of the Dawn with Thierry Lhermitte filmed at Angoulême and Cognac
- SOS 18 shot in and around Angoulême
- Father and Mayor filmed in the communes of Angoulême and Magnac-sur-Touvre (in the series, Angoulême is called Ville-Grand)
- My son anyway by Williams Crépin with Clémentine Célarié in 2004.
- And you About Love? by Lola Doillon, 2007
- Mammuth by Benoit Delépine and Gustave Kervern
- To the four winds by Jacques Doillon
- Dying of love by Josée Dayan, with Muriel Robin
- At the bottom of the ladder by Arnaud Mercadier with Vincent Elbaz, Claude Brasseur, Bernadette Lafont, and Helena Noguerra
- Victoire Bonnot with Valerie Damidot and Shirley Bousquet filmed at the Saint-Paul Secondary School
- The Lies by Fabrice Cazeneuve with Hippolyte Girardot and Marilyne Canto, filmed in Angoulême and Puymoyen, released in 2010
- Code Lyoko Evolution, filmed mid-2012 at the Lycée Guez de Balzac
- Le Grand Soir filmed at Angoulême and the ZAC at Montagnes by Benoît Delépine and Gustave Kervern with Albert Dupontel and Benoît Poelvoorde 2012.
- Indiscretions by Josée Dayan with Muriel Robin, filmed during the summer of 2013 in Angoulême, Saint-Même-les-Carrières and Bassac, released in November 2013.
- The French Dispatch - Wes Anderson's 10th film was shot in the area between 2018 and 2019.

== Twin towns – sister cities ==
Angoulême is twinned with:

- Bury, England, United Kingdom (1959)
- Hildesheim, Germany (1965)
- Vitoria Gasteiz, Spain (1967)
- Saguenay, Canada (1969)
- Gelendzhik, Russia (1977)
- Ségou, Mali (1984)
- Turda, Romania (1994)
- Hoffman Estates, United States (1996)
- Chaves, Portugal (2017)

== Demography ==
The inhabitants of the commune are known as Angoumoisins or Angoumoisines in French.

=== Demographic classification ===
Population of the Urban Area of Angoulême (INSEE 2018)
Zone	Population	Area(km^{2})	Density (/km^{2})
Angoulême	41,711	21.9	1,909
Urban unit	109,395	202.4	541
Functional area	179,758	1,512	119
Charente	351,778	5,956	59

By population Angoulême is by far the largest city in Charente with 41,711 inhabitants on 1 January 2018. With a communal area of 2,185 hectares, the population density is 1,909 inhabitants per km^{2}, making it the most densely populated city in Charente.

In 2018, the urban unit of Angoulême, which includes eighteen communes, totaled 109,395 inhabitants. It is the seventh most populous urban unit of Nouvelle-Aquitaine, and extends over fifteen kilometres (9.3 miles) from north to south.

Its functional area has 179,758 inhabitants (2018), and is composed of 94 communes in the impact zone of the city.

=== Demographic changes ===
In 2023 Angoulême had 41,908 inhabitants, down 13% from its largest population in 1962.

Historical population

Year	Pop.	±% p.a.
1793	11,500	—
1800	13,000	+1.77%
1806	15,011	+2.43%
1821	15,025	+0.01%
1831	15,186	+0.11%
1841	18,622	+2.06%
1846	20,085	+1.52%
1851	21,155	+1.04%
1856	22,811	+1.52%
1861	24,961	+1.82%
1866	25,116	+0.12%
1872	25,928	+0.53%
1876	30,513	+4.15%
1881	32,567	+1.31%
1886	34,647	+1.25%
1891	36,690	+1.15%
1896	38,068	+0.74%
1901	37,650	−0.22%

Year	Pop.	±% p.a.
1906	37,507	−0.08%
1911	38,211	+0.37%
1921	34,895	−0.90%
1926	35,994	+0.62%
1931	36,699	+0.39%
1936	38,915	+1.18%
1946	44,244	+1.29%
1954	43,170	−0.31%
1962	48,190	+1.38%
1968	47,822	−0.13%
1975	47,221	−0.18%
1982	46,197	−0.31%
1990	42,876	−0.93%
1999	43,171	+0.08%
2007	42,669	−0.15%
2012	42,014	−0.31%
2017	41,740	−0.13%
2023	41,908	+0.07%

Source: EHESS and INSEE

=== Distribution of age groups ===
The population of Angoulême is significantly younger than the average of Charente, notably the age group 15-24 is much larger.

Percentage Distribution of Age Groups in Angoulême and Charente Department in 2017

Population by age of Angoulême, 2023 (%)

80+	6.8
65–79	14
55–64	11.3
40–54	17.7
25–39	19.9
15–24	16.3
0–14	13.9

Total: 99.9

male

female

Source: INSEE

Population by age of Charente, 2023 (%)

90+	8.1
75–89	18.9
60–74	14.5
45–59	18.6
30–44	15.4
15–29	9.9
0–14	14.6

Total: 100

male

female

Source: INSEE

== Economy ==
Angoulême is a centre of the paper-making and printing industry, with which the town has been connected since the 14th century. Papermaking is favoured because of the uniform temperature and volume of the water year-round, partly due to the river Touvre, which joins the Charente at Angoulême. The Touvre is the second largest river with an underground source in France after the Sorgue (Fontaine-de-Vaucluse).

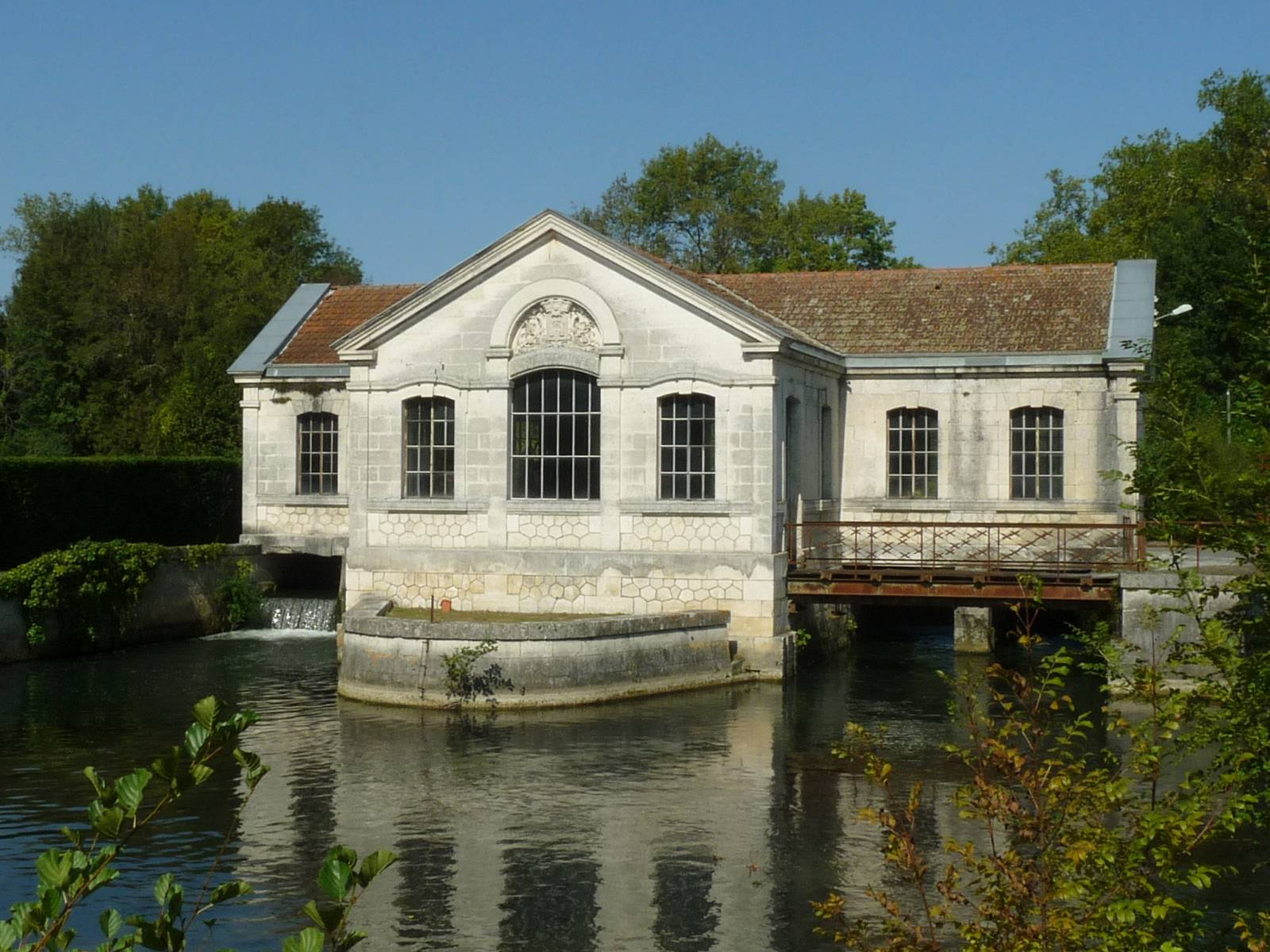
Former pumping station to bring up water from the Touvre

The Touvre emerges as a full-blown river from the head of the valley at Ruelle. A trout fishery is located at the source and a pumping station supplies the drinking water needs of Angoulême. Most of the paper mills are situated on the banks of watercourses in the neighbourhood of the town. Cardboard for packaging, as well as fine vellum for correspondence, have been produced in quantity.

The best known export is Rizla cigarette roll-up paper, a combination of riz (rice paper) and LaCroix, after Monsieur LaCroix the founder. Le Nil is another local brand of roll-up paper, named not after the Nile in Egypt but after a small tributary of the Charente. The Le Nil paper-mill is now the Paper Museum. Paper-making in the town has been in decline.

The economy of the modern town also is supplemented by annual tourist events and festivals. For example, the printers and paper-makers, whose industry relied on intricate machinery, became skilled mechanics and among the first to become fascinated with the motor car in the late 19th century. Motor trials were held regularly, starting on the long straight road through Puymoyen, now a suburb. Monsieur LaCroix (of RIZLA+) was a celebrated motorcycle racer. The Paris–Madrid road race of 1903, notorious for its cancellation due to numerous deaths, passed through Angoulême. Marcel, one of the brothers Renault, was one of the victims. The place of his death is marked by a memorial on road RN10 to Poitiers.

The town has been closely associated with motor trials and racing. The Circuit des Remparts is held annually, one of the last such street-racing course in France, together with Pau (and Monaco). In addition to local heroes, internationally known racing drivers, such as Juan Manuel Fangio, José Froilán González, Jean-Pierre Wimille, Pierre Veyron and Maurice Trintignant, have been regular participants. The cars which they drove frequently are presented at the modern event. The hotel and restaurant trade receives a considerable boost from the races.

Subsidiary industries, such as the manufacture of machinery, electric motors and wire fabric, are of considerable importance. Angoulême is the most inland navigable port on the Charente River. The traditional river boat is the Gabare. Iron and copper founding, brewing and tanning also continue. The manufacture of gunpowder, confectionery, heavy iron goods, gloves, boots and shoes (including the traditional pantoufle carpet slippers) and cotton goods are also important. There is wholesale and retail trade in wine, cognac and building-stone.

== Transportation ==
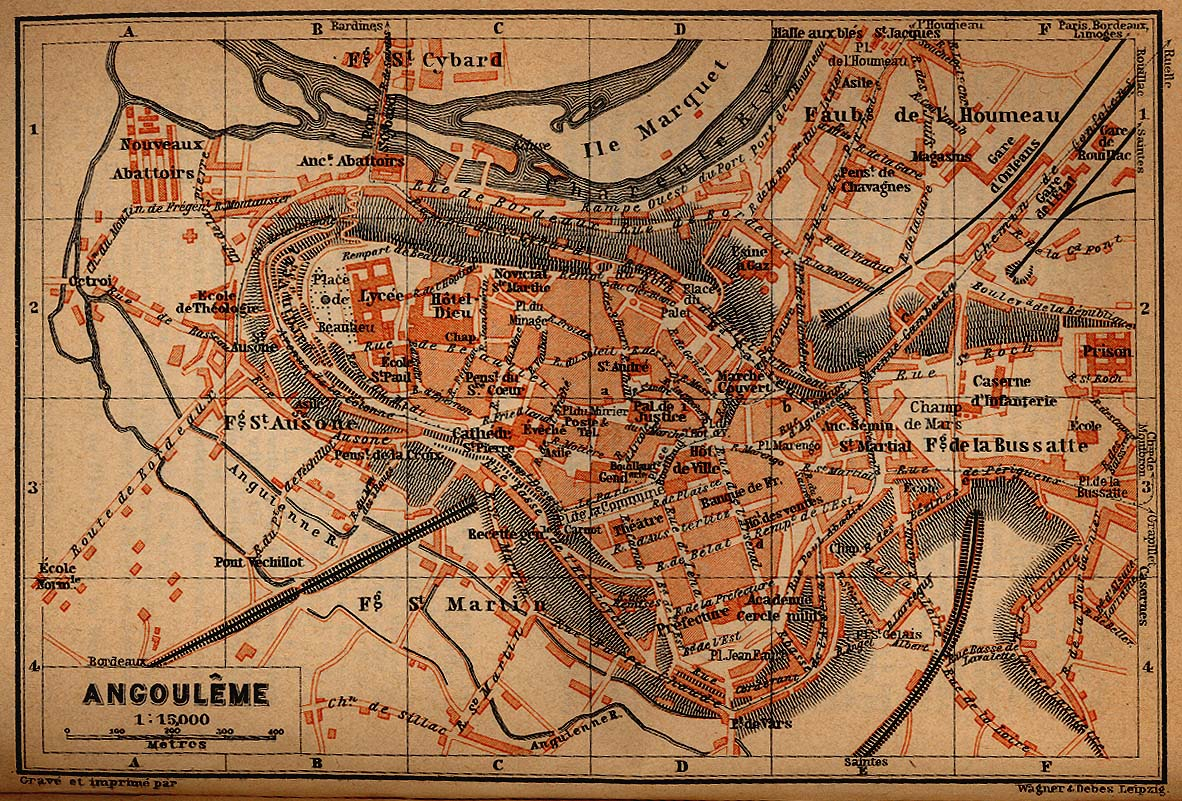
Angoulême in 1914

The high-speed rail link between Tours and Bordeaux bypasses the town centre to the west, but with a link to Angoulême station from both the north and south. It opened in July 2017. Direct TGV journeys from Paris Gare Montparnasse take just over two hours. The Angoulême railway station offers connections to Paris, Bordeaux, Tours, Limoges and several regional destinations. The main line of the Paris Bordeaux railway passes through a tunnel beneath the town.

Angoulême - Cognac International Airport is situated 9.5 km (5.9 mi) northeast of the city centre in Champniers, just off the N10. The runway can accommodate narrow-body jetliners, and a new restaurant and shops were added in 2008. However Ryanair stopped its Angoulême-Stansted service in 2010. Air France used to operate a service to Lyon. There are currently no regular flights to/from Angoulême airport. The nearest major airport is Limoges–Bellegarde Airport.

The city's local bus system is run by STGA.

== Culture and heritage ==
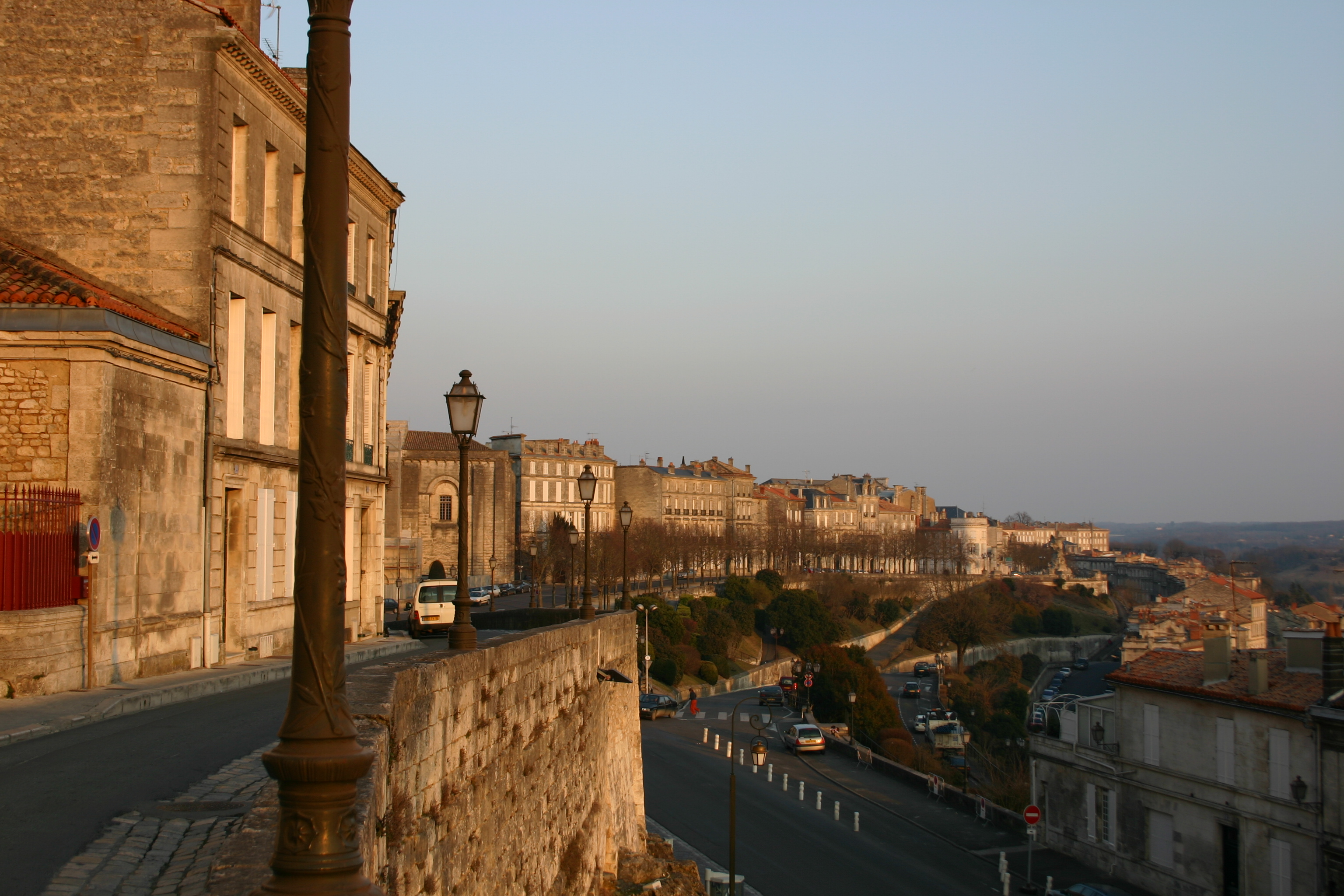
Angoulême

Angoulême and its environs are classified as French Towns and Lands of Art and History. The old town is encircled by city walls, known as the Remparts, within which the cathedral and the city hall are architecturally notable. This quarter has cobbled streets and is largely reserved for pedestrians. Angoulême has many buildings and structures that are registered as historical monuments. Below are listed some of the more notable sites.

=== Civil heritage ===
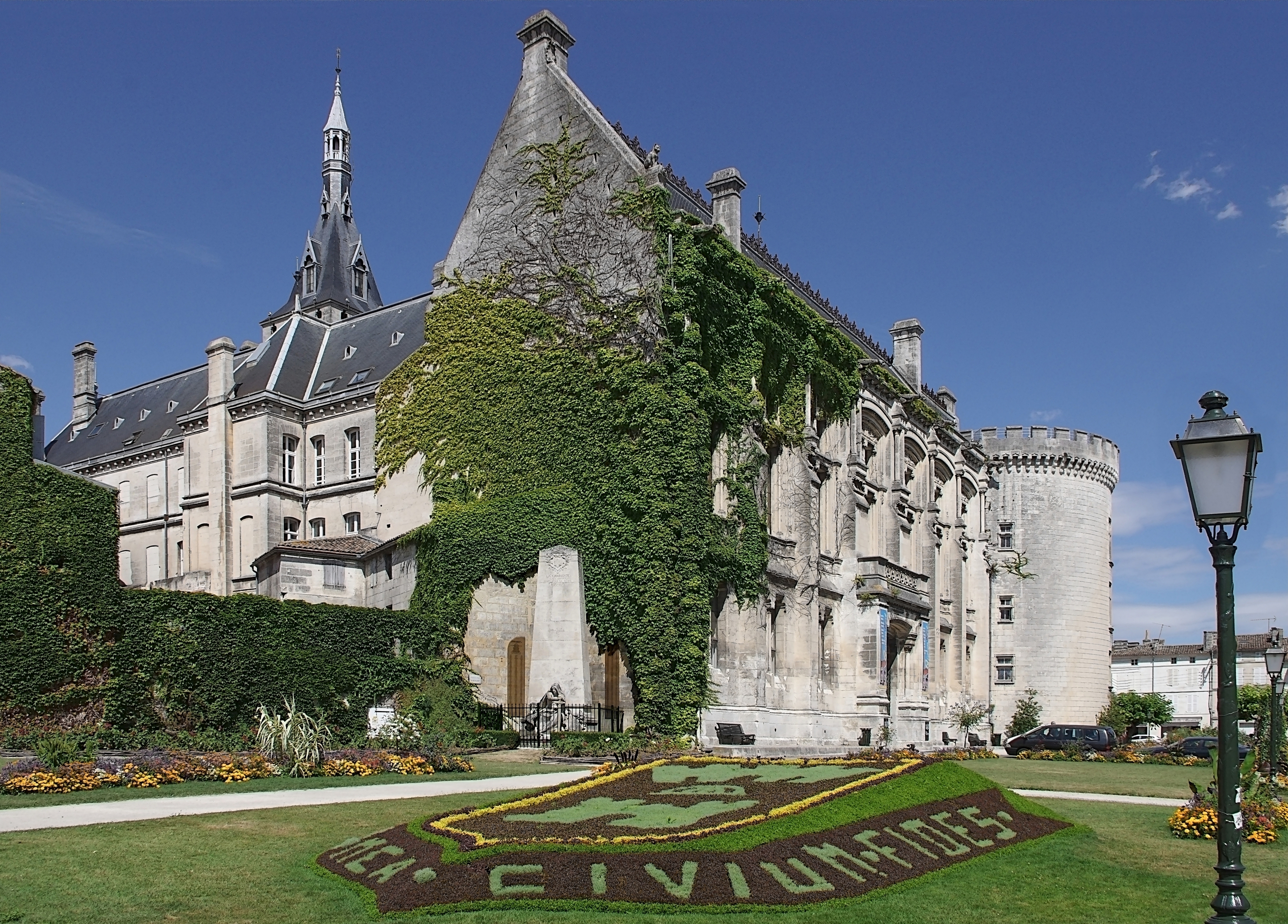
The approaches to the Hôtel de Ville (city hall) with elegant green spaces

- The Hôtel de Ville (town hall) (13th century) was designed by Paul Abadie and is a 19th-century structure. It has preserved and incorporated two 13th-century towers, Lusignan and Valois, from the Castle of the Counts of Angoulême on the site on which it was built. It contains museums of paintings and archaeology.
- The Ramparts (4th century). The ramparts form a balcony overlooking the Charente.
- The Market building (1886) is made of architectural glass and iron of Baltard type.
- The Palace of Justice was built on an old convent at the end of the 19th century by Paul Abadie's father.
- The Municipal Theatre has a superb façade.
- The College Jules Verne, a former deanery, it has preserved the old chapel with stained glass and carved woodwork in the music room and a vaulted chapel with stone keystones and stained glass - visible from the Rue de Beaulieu - which has become the CDI.
- The Guez de Balzac School built by Paul Abadie father and son.

There are very many old houses:

- The Maison Saint-Simon in Rue de la Cloche-Verte (16th century) built in the Renaissance style.
- The Hotel de Bardines at 79 Rue de Beaulieu (18th century) is attributed to the Angoulême architect Jean-Baptiste Michel Vallin de la Mothe. The building is impressive in size.
- The Hotel Montalembert
- The House called Archers
- The Hôtel Mousnier-Longpré at 24 Rue Friedland (12th century) was rebuilt in the 15th century. It has remarkable façades on the Rue de l'Évêché, Rue de Friedland, and the courtyard.
- A Hotel Particular described in Illusions perdues (Lost Illusions) by Honoré de Balzac as that of Madame de Bargeton.
- An Ancient Portal at 59 Rue du Minage (17th century)
- An Ancient Portal at 61 Rue du Minage (16th century)

Places (Squares) in Old Angoulême

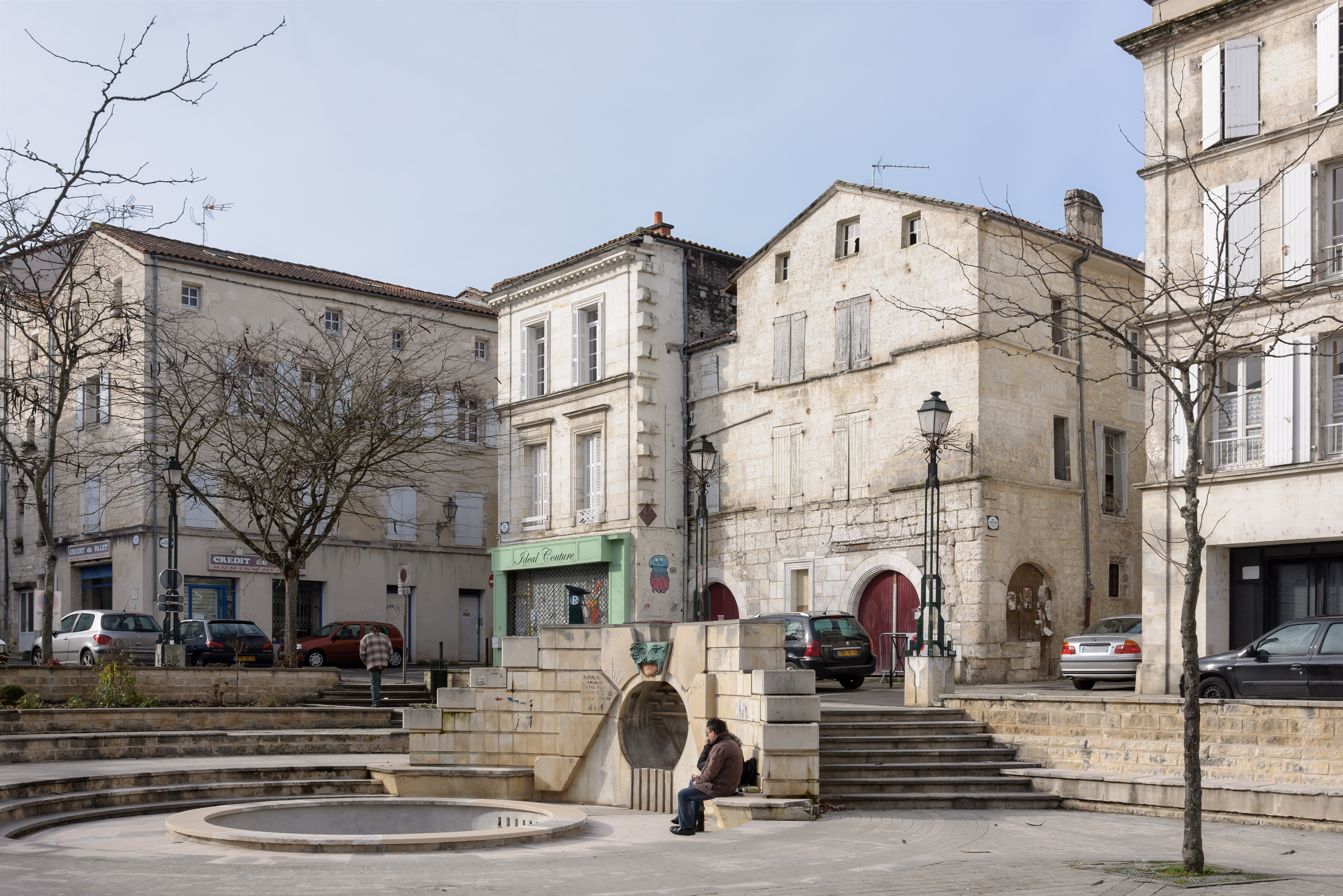
The Place du Palet

- The Place du Minage with its fountain from the Second Empire and its benches has a Mediterranean flair in the heart of the old town. In the 14th and the 19th centuries there was intense commercial activity.
- The Place Henri Dunant. Named after the founder of the Red Cross, it now borders the Gabriel Fauré conservatory, formerly the Saint-Louis College then a police station.
- The Place New-York. This square, formerly called the Park, was installed in the 18th century in the first real town planning project. It has remained a promenade and a venue for various events. In 1956 the square changed its name again. The city council decided to call it the Place New York, in memory of the journey by Giovanni da Verrazzano in the service of François I who, in 1524, named the site of the present New York: New Angoulême.
- The 'Place Beaulieu. Located at the western end of the plateau and the old city, it offers a vast panorama to passers-by and has long been a pleasant place to walk. It borders the imposing Guez de Balzac School on the site of an ancient abbey.
- The Place Bouillaud and the Place de l'Hotel de Ville. In addition to the City Hall there is also (in front of the entrance to the City Hall) an art nouveau façade.
- The Place Francis Louvel. Formerly called du mûrier, it was and remains one of the busiest places in the old town. Formerly the garden of a convent until the 16th century, it was embellished in the 18th and 19th centuries with new buildings and a fountain. The Palace of Justice is there. The place changed its name in 1946 to take the name of Francis Louvel - a resistance fighter shot by the Germans in 1944.
- The Place du Palet. This site occupies a vast space which, in the past, was in front of the main gate of the old city and for three centuries housed an imposing hall. The site was redeveloped in the 1980s.
- The Place du Général Resnier.

Tours of the town include the murs peints, various walls painted in street-art cartoon style, a feature of Angoulême and related to its association with the bande dessinée, the comic strip. A statue has been erected to Hergé, creator of The Adventures of Tintin. The attractive covered market Les Halles, on the site of the old jail, was restored and refurbished in 2004 and is a central part of city life.

In 2009 the National Council of Cities and Villages in Bloom of France awarded four flowers to the commune in the competition for cities and villages in bloom.

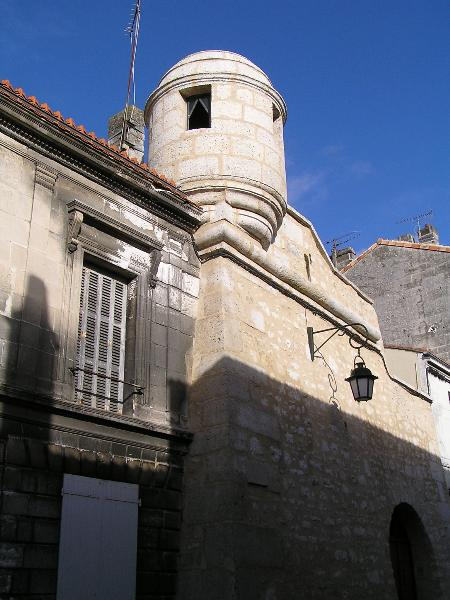
Watchtower in the old Épernon wall

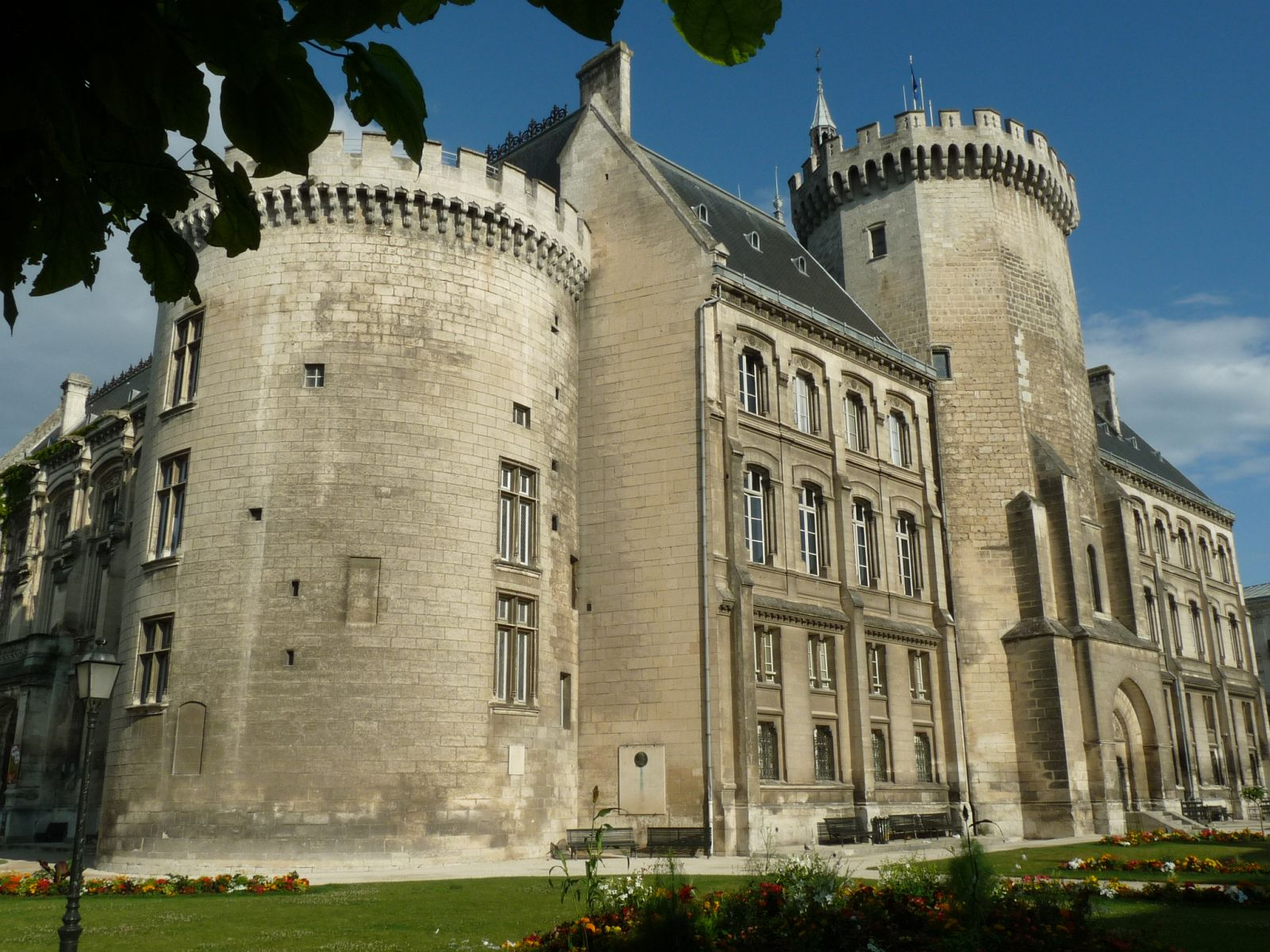
City Hall

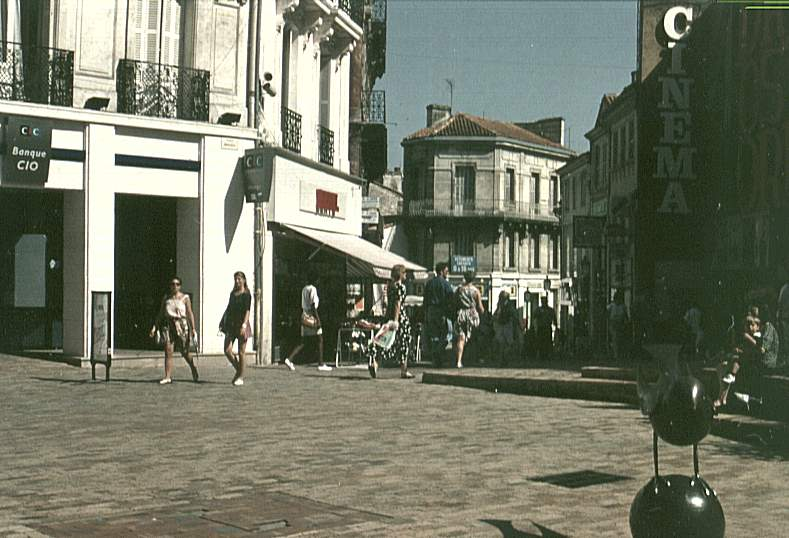
The Pedestrian shopping area in 1992

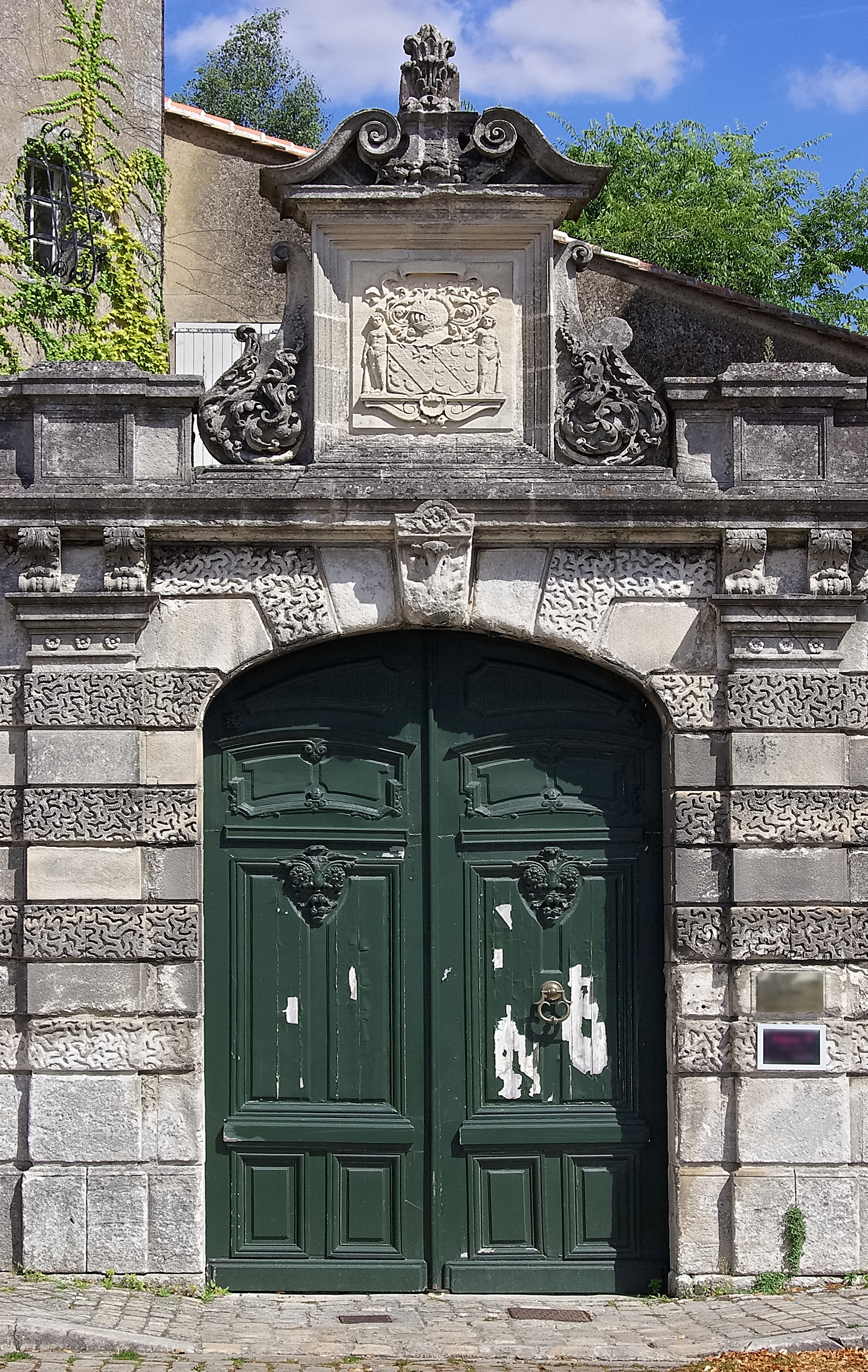
The 19th-century gate on the Hotel Montalembert

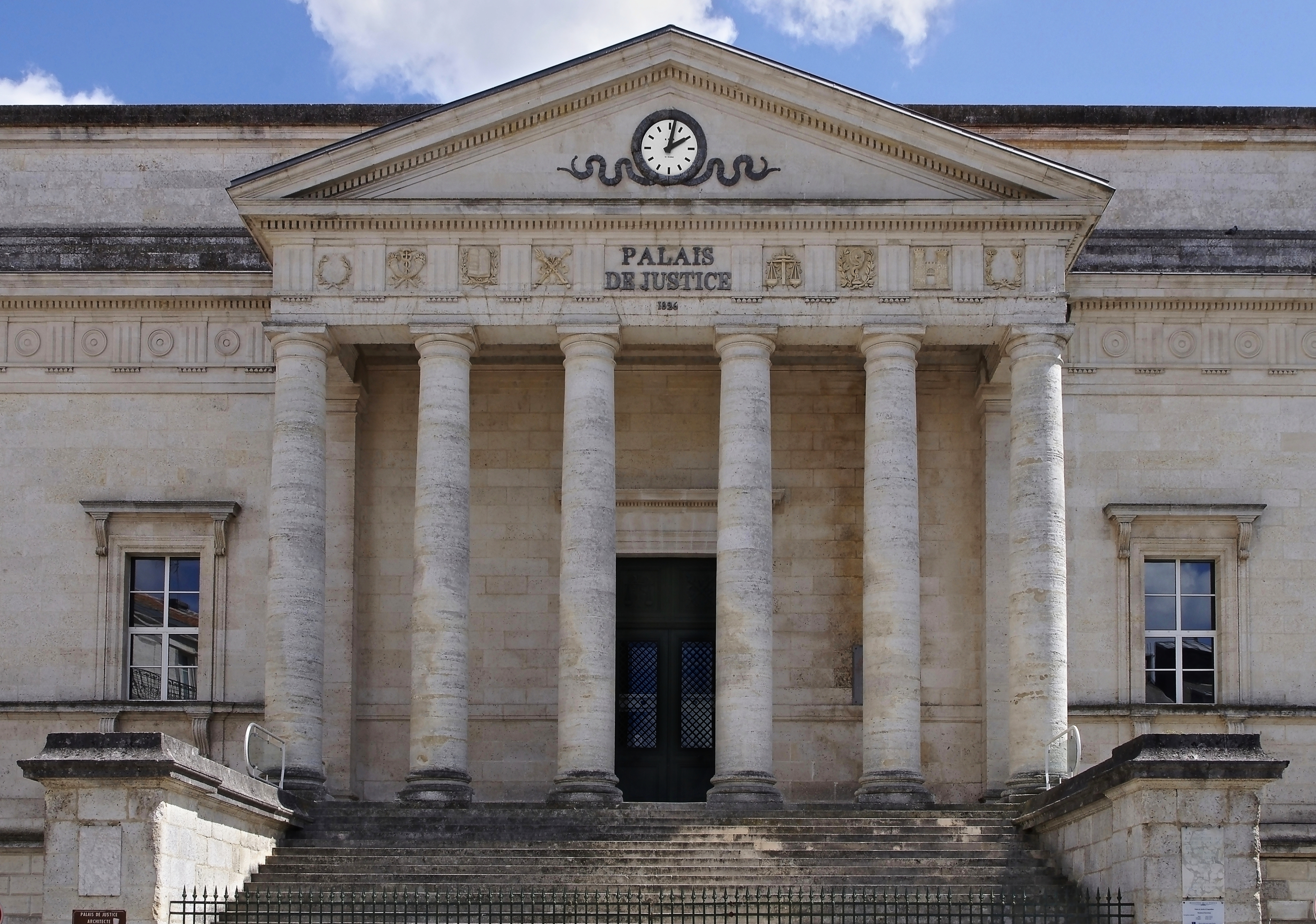
The Palace of Justice

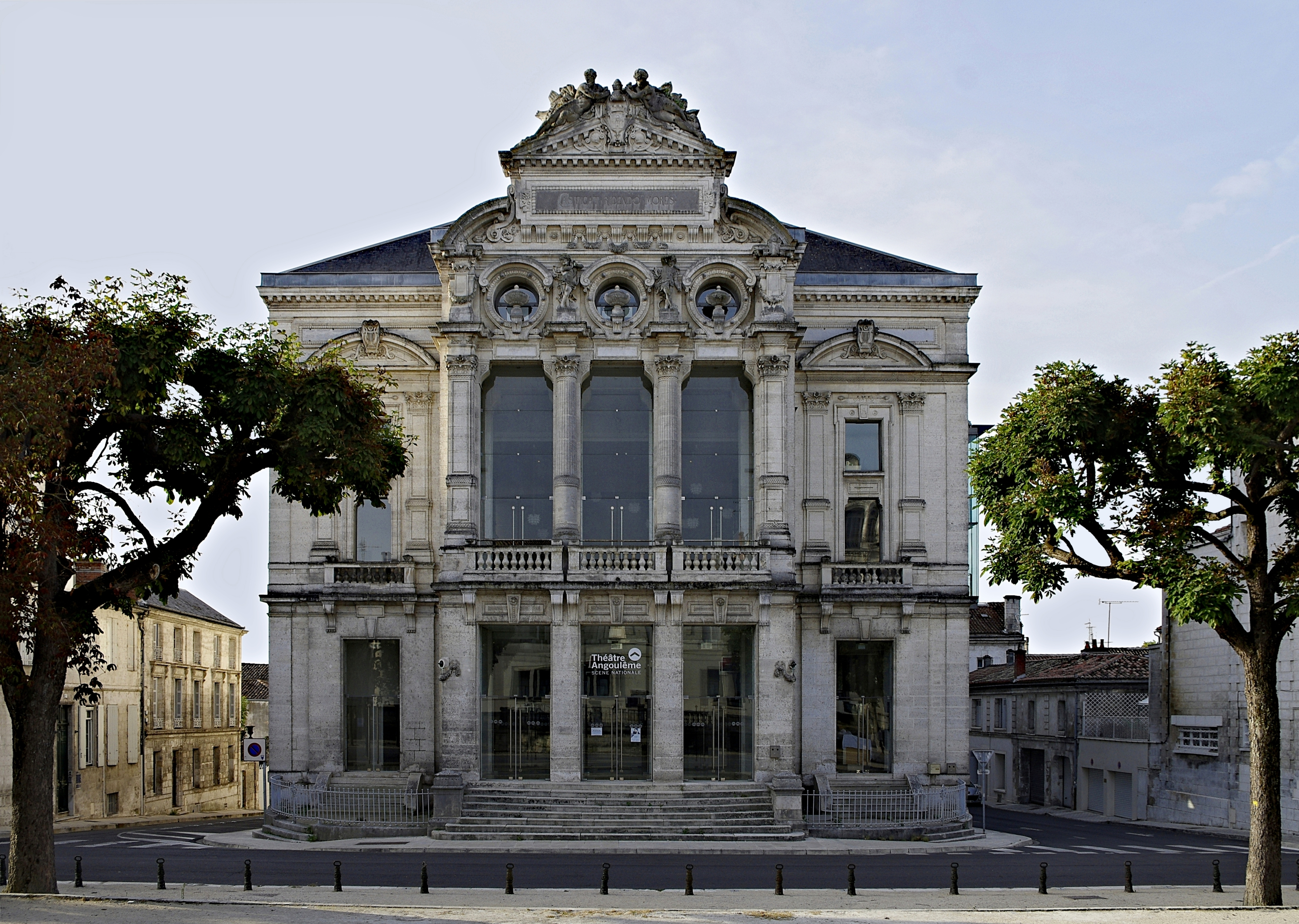
The Municipal Theatre

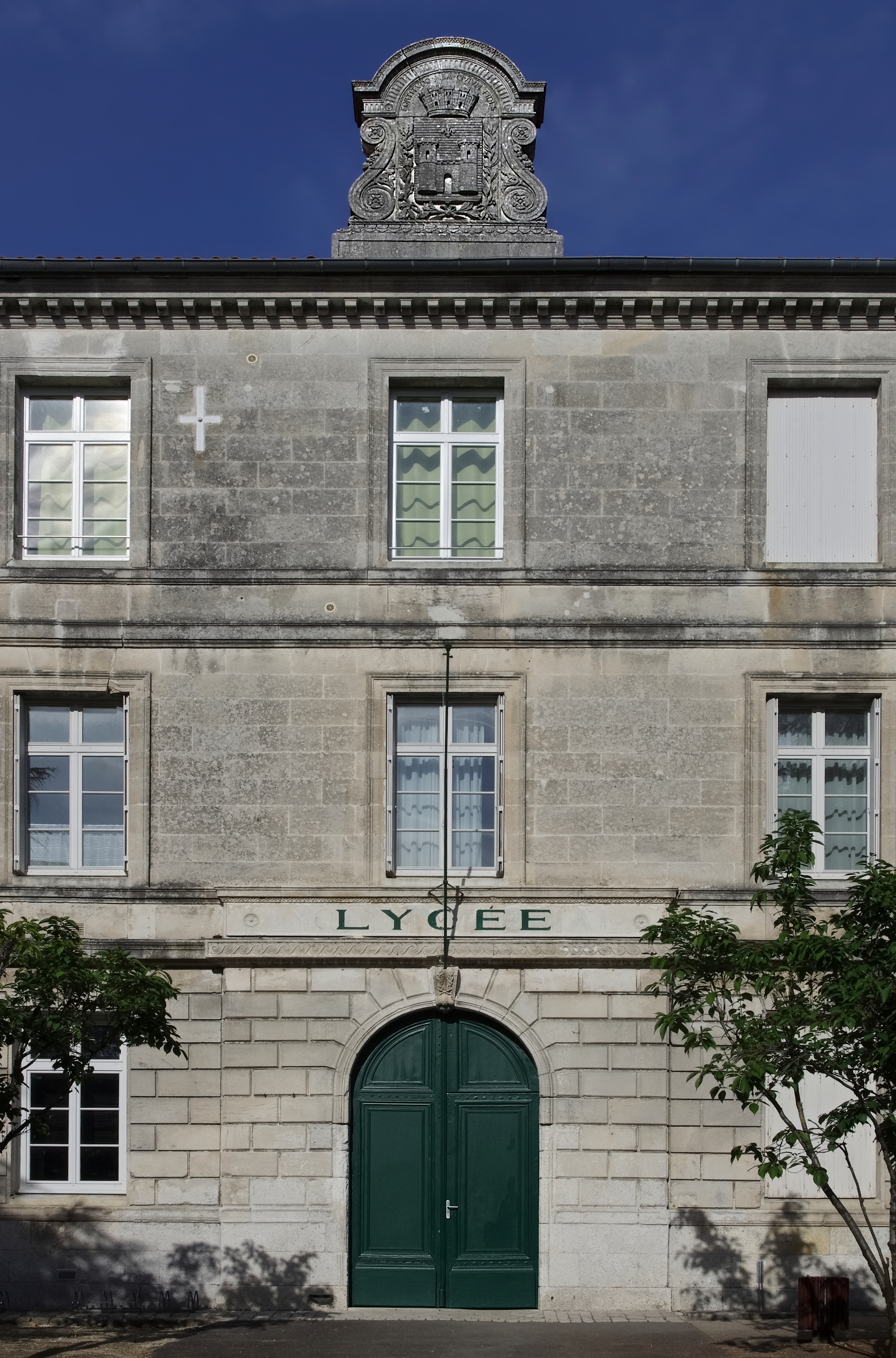
Entrance to the Guez de Balzac school

=== Religious heritage ===
- Angoulême Cathedral (12th century) is dedicated to Saint Peter and is a church in the Romanesque style. It has undergone frequent restoration since the 12th century. It was partly rebuilt in the latter half of the 19th century by architect Paul Abadie. The façade, flanked by two towers with cupolas, is decorated with arcades featuring statuary and sculpture with the whole representing the "Last Judgment". The crossing is surmounted by a dome. The north transept is topped by a fine square tower over 160 ft (49 m) high. The Cathedral contains a very large number of items that are registered as historical objects.
- The remains of the Abbey of Saint-Cybard (13th century) at the International City of Cartoons and Images (CNBDI)
- The Church of Saint-André at Rue Taillefer (12th century) has been rebuilt several times. The church contains a large number of items that are registered as historical objects.
- A Lantern of the Dead in the cemetery of the Church of Saint André (12th century) is actually a hearth - a remnant of the old Taillefer Palace.
- The old Bishop's Palace at Rue Friedland (15th century) is today the Museum of Fine Arts of Angoulême. The bishop's house contains a number of items that are registered as historical objects:
  - A Sarcophagus (6th century)
  - A Crozier: The Annunciation (13th century)
  - 2 Croziers: The Virgin (13th century)
  - A Crozier: Tau (12th century)
- The Hospital Chapel was the old Chapel of the Cordeliers Convent where Guez de Balzac is buried. The chapel contains several items that are registered as historical objects:
  - A Tapestry: Pagan Sacrifice to an Idol (18th century)
  - A Tapestry: Rest after the Harvest (17th century)
  - A Chest of Drawers (18th century)
  - A Painting: The Virgin and Saint Antoine of Padua (18th century)
  - A Painting: The Dead Christ (18th century)
  - A Painting: The Descent from the Cross (18th century)
  - A Painting: Virgin and child (17th century)
  - A Commemorative Plaque (1654)
  - A Bronze Bowl (16th century)
- The Church of Saint-Jacques de Lhoumeau (1840) The church contains a Gallery Organ (18th century) which is registered as an historical object.
- The Church of Saint-Martial (1849) in Neo-Romanesque style by Paul Abadie. The church contains a large number of items that are registered as historical objects.
- The Church of Saint Ausone from the same period and architect. The church contains a Statue of Saint Ausone (17th century) which is registered as an historical object.
- The Chapel Notre-Dame d'Obézine (or Bézines) (1895)
- The Hôtel-Dieu
- The old Carmelite convent
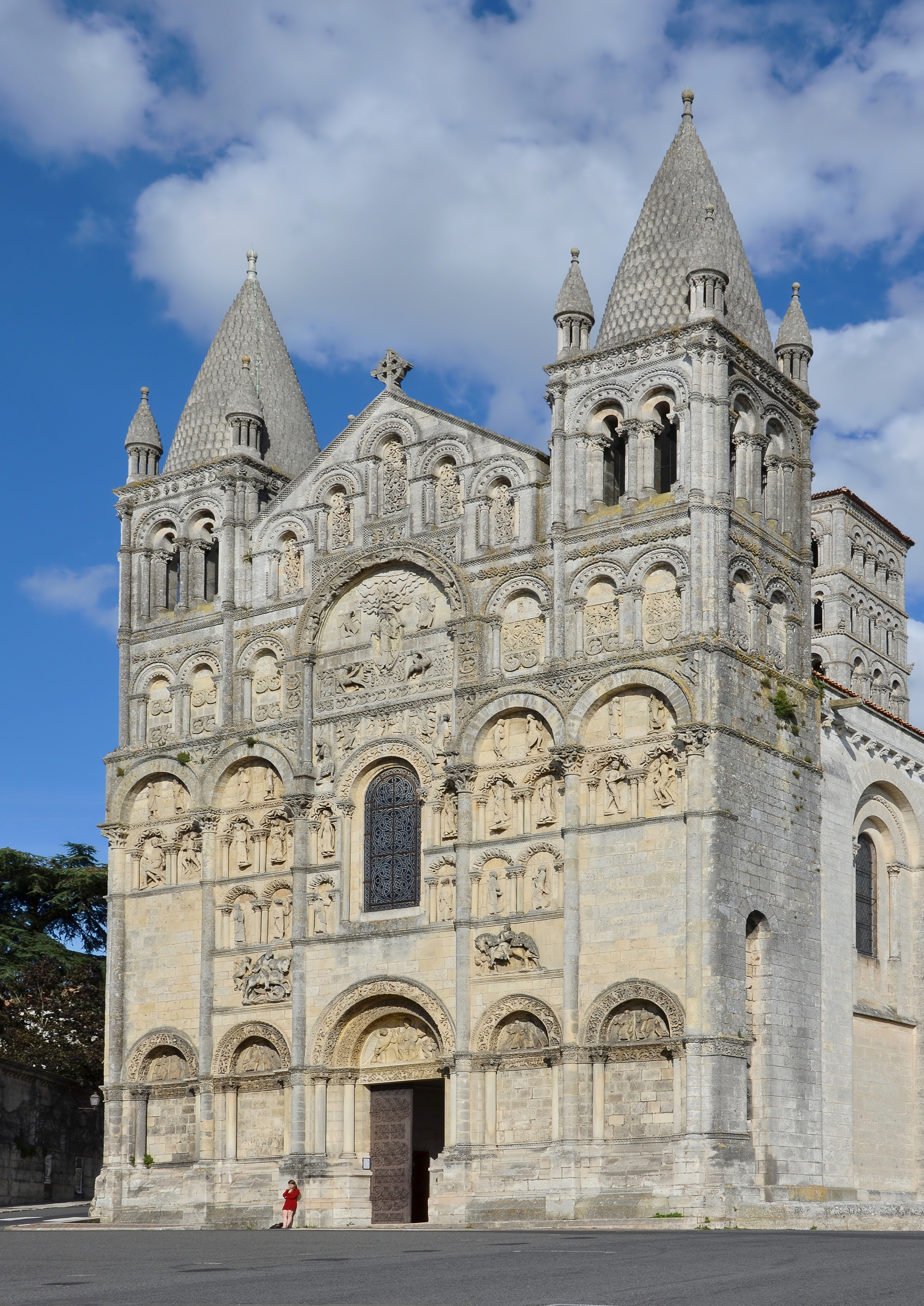
Angoulême Cathedral

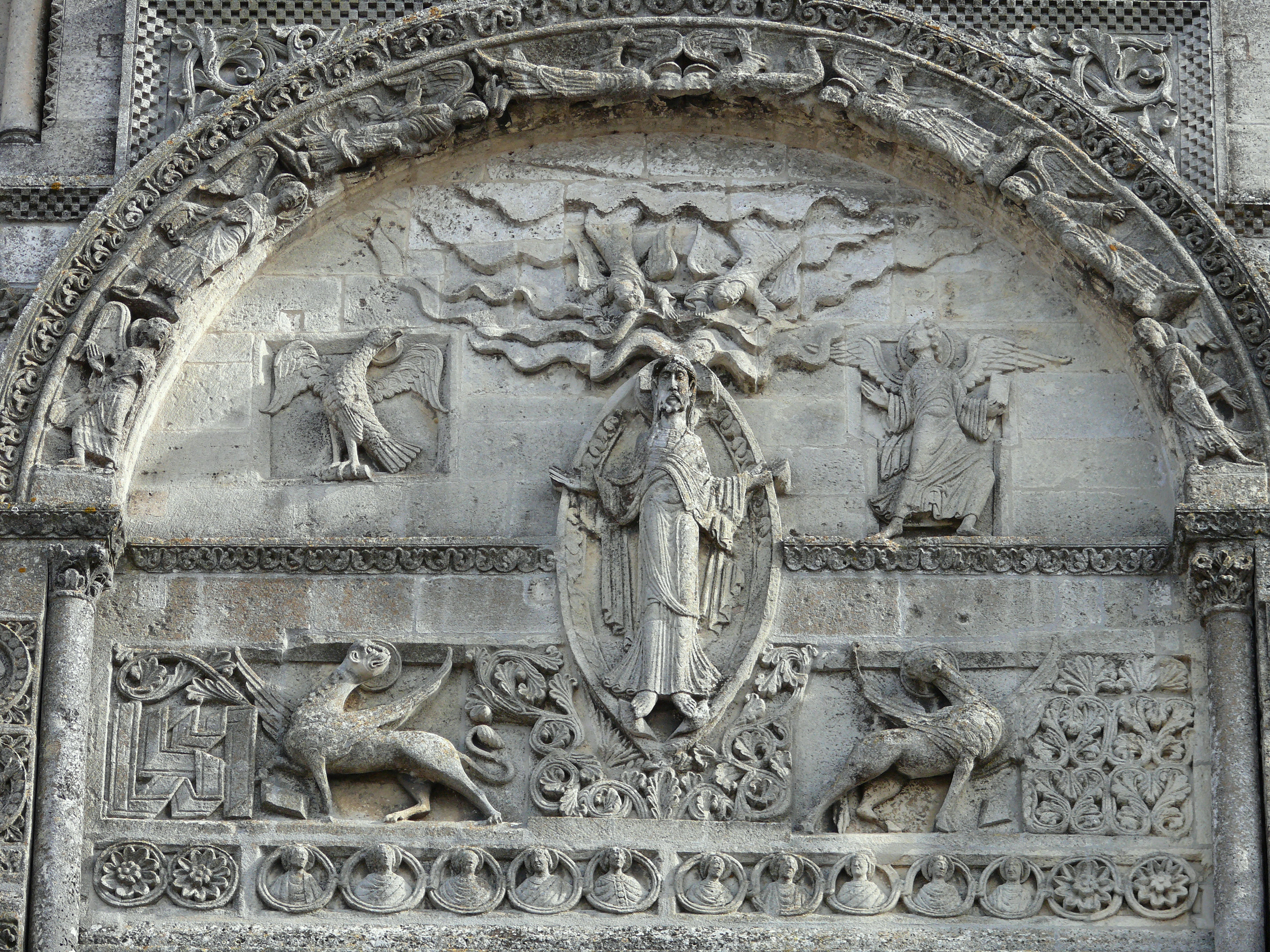
An Aureola on the Cathedral

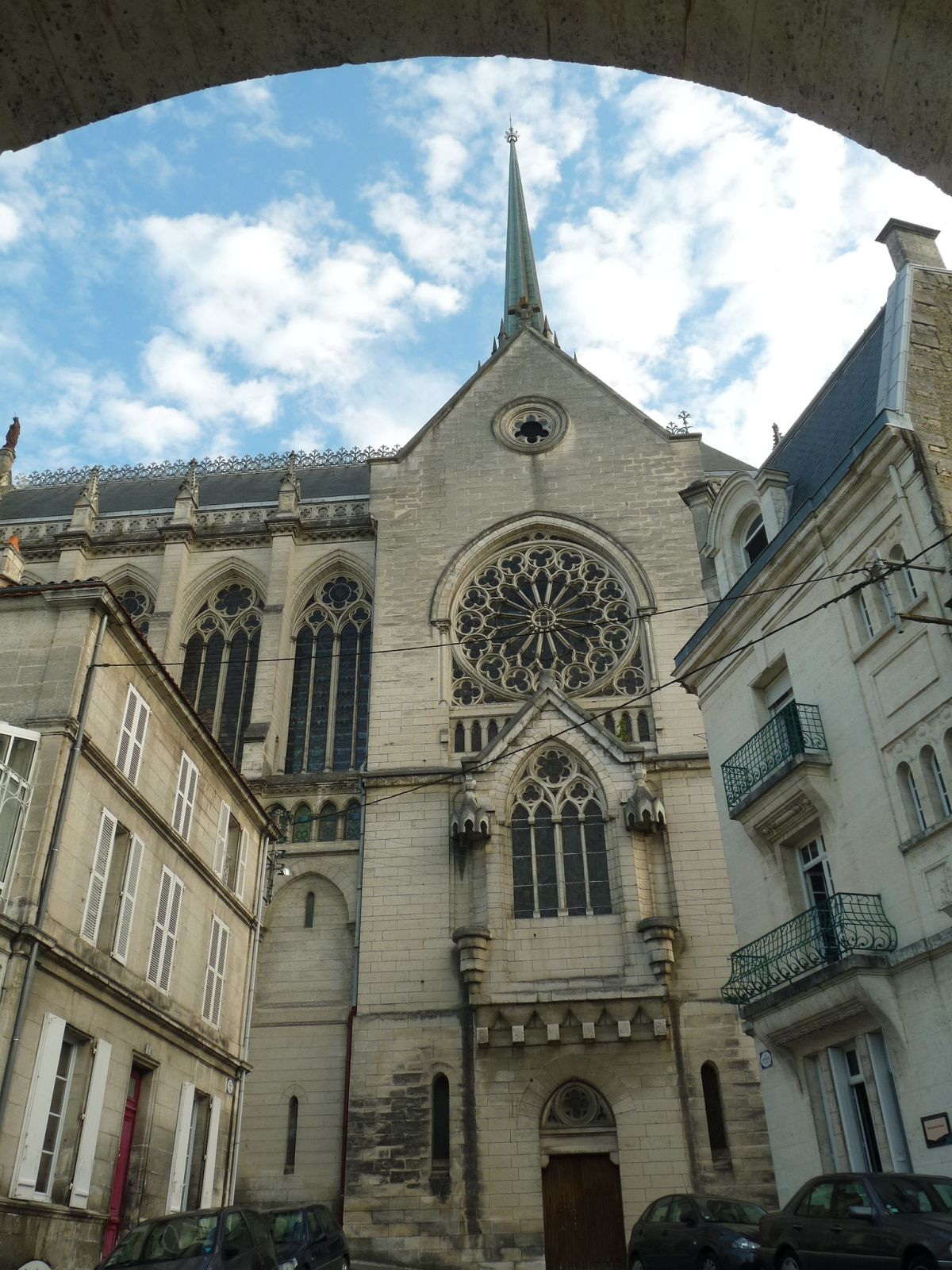
Church of Obézine

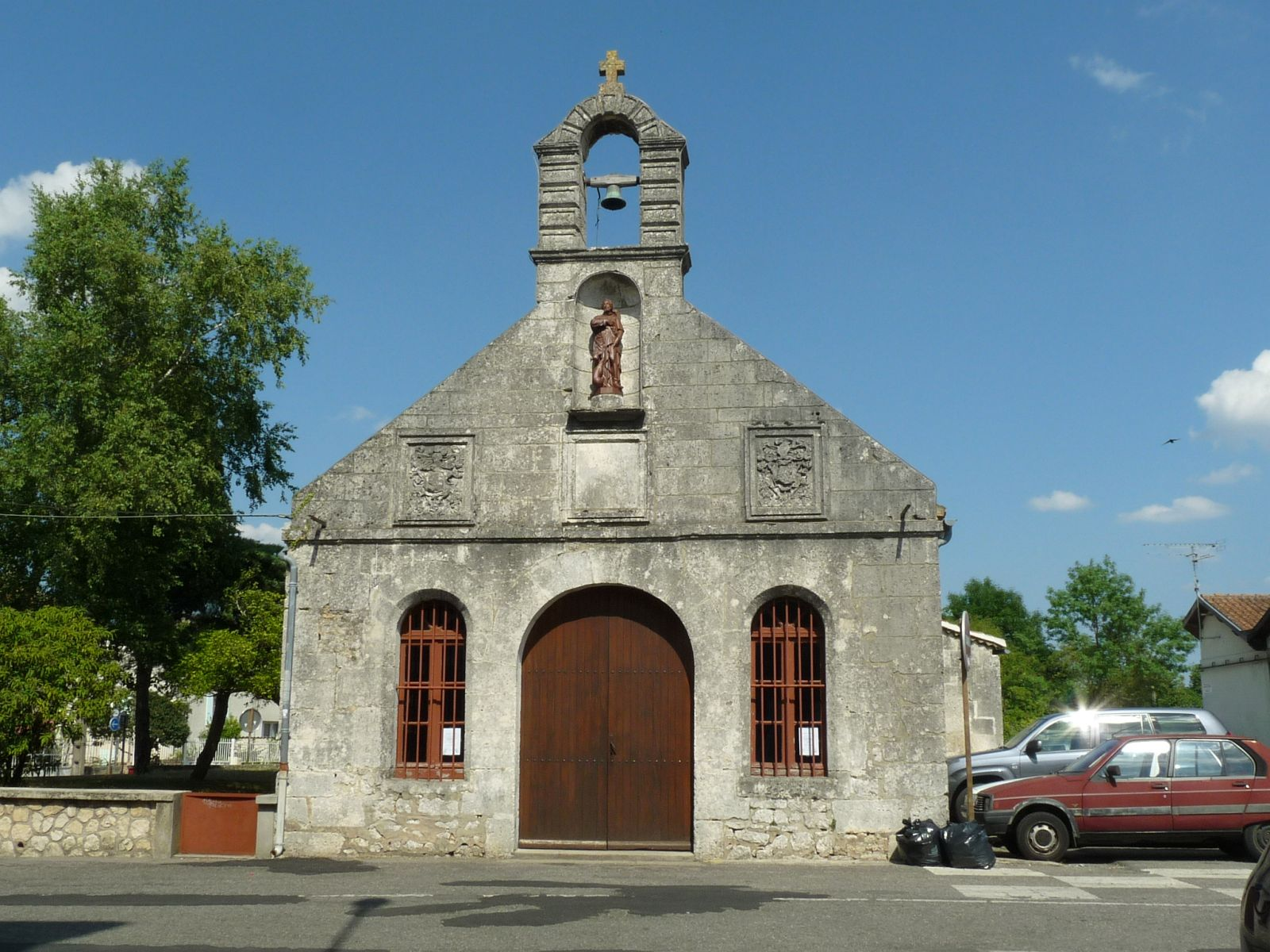
Chapel Saint-Roch

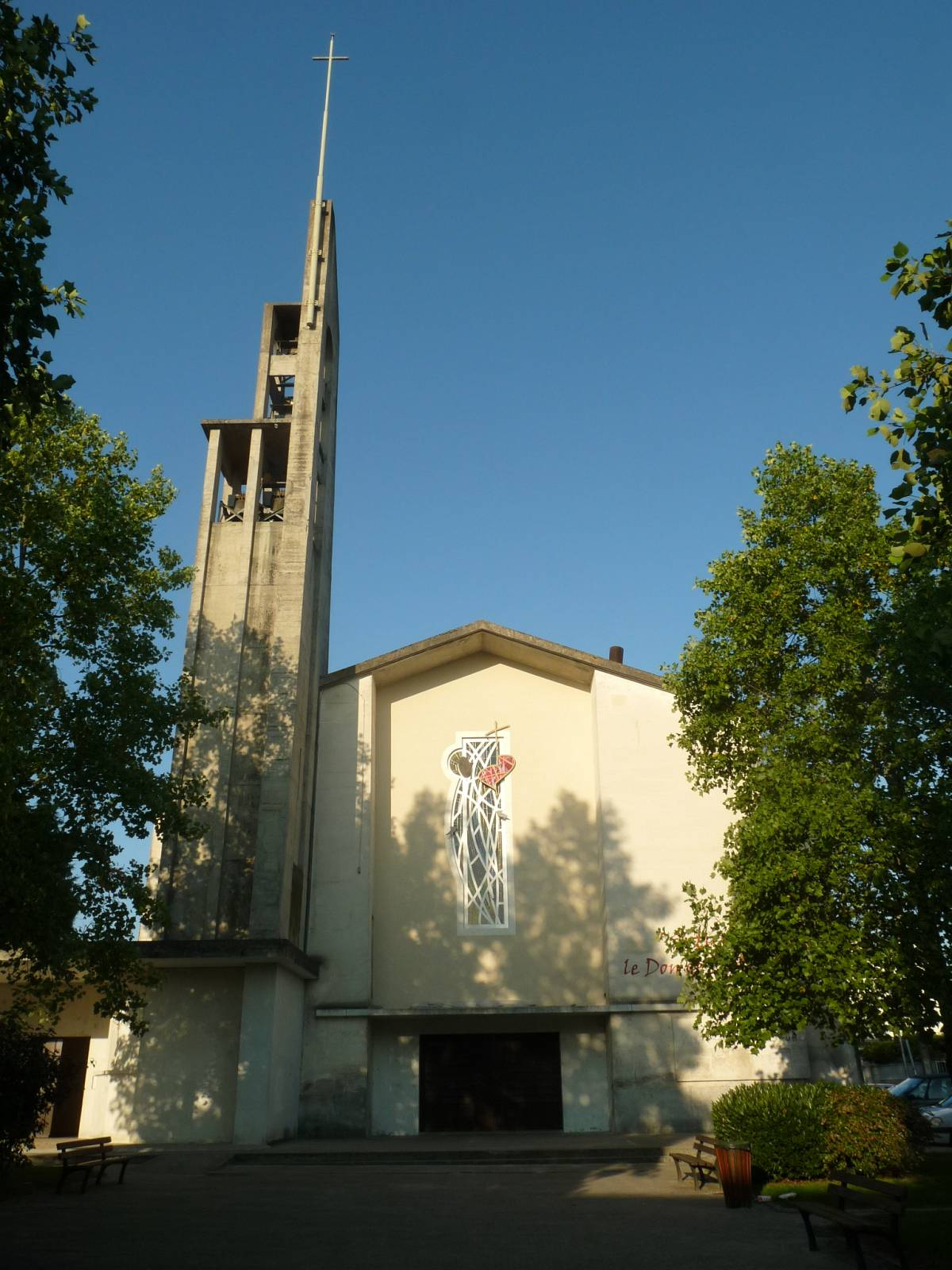
Church of the Sacred Heart

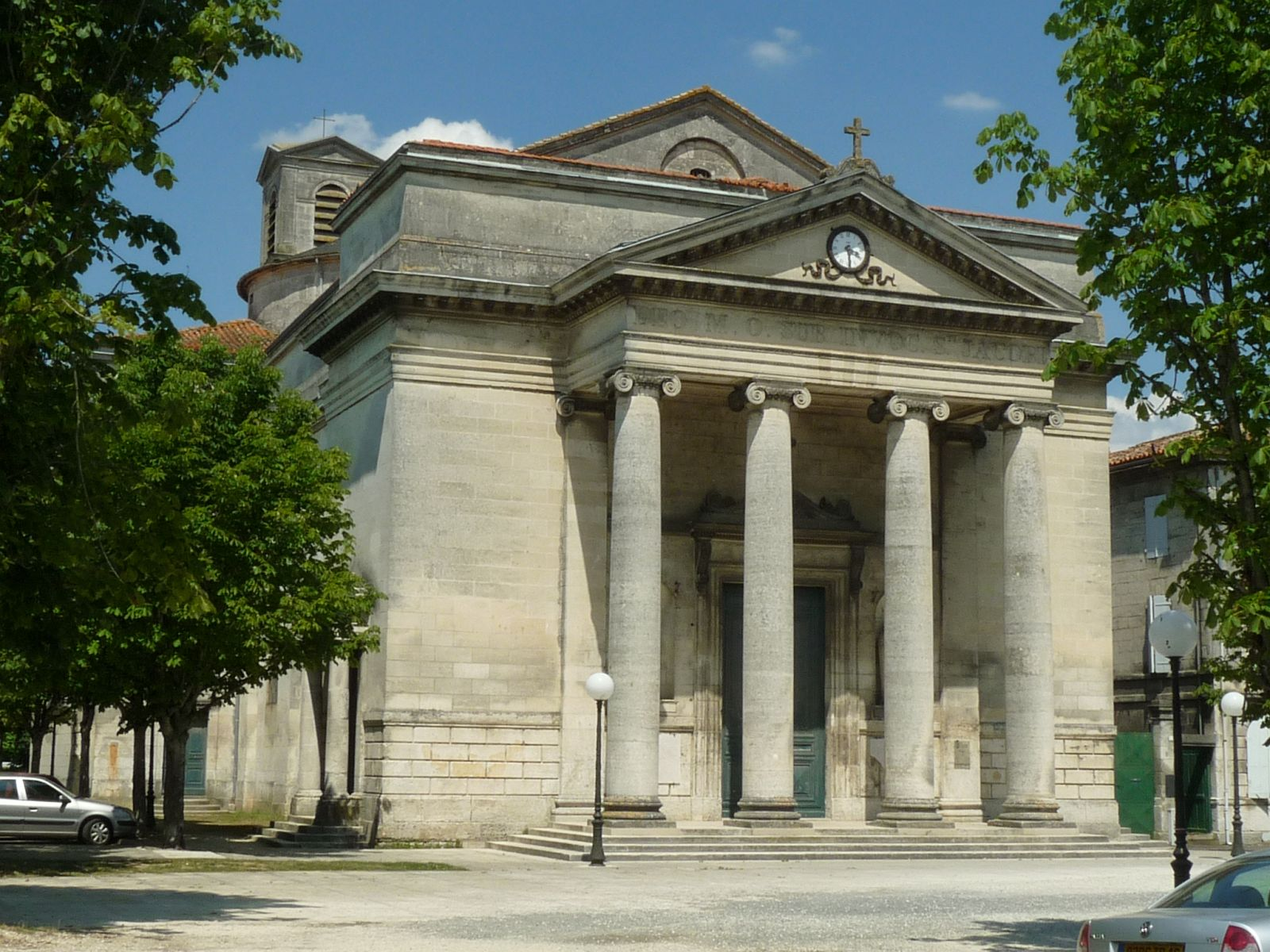
Church of Saint-Jacques de l'Houmeau

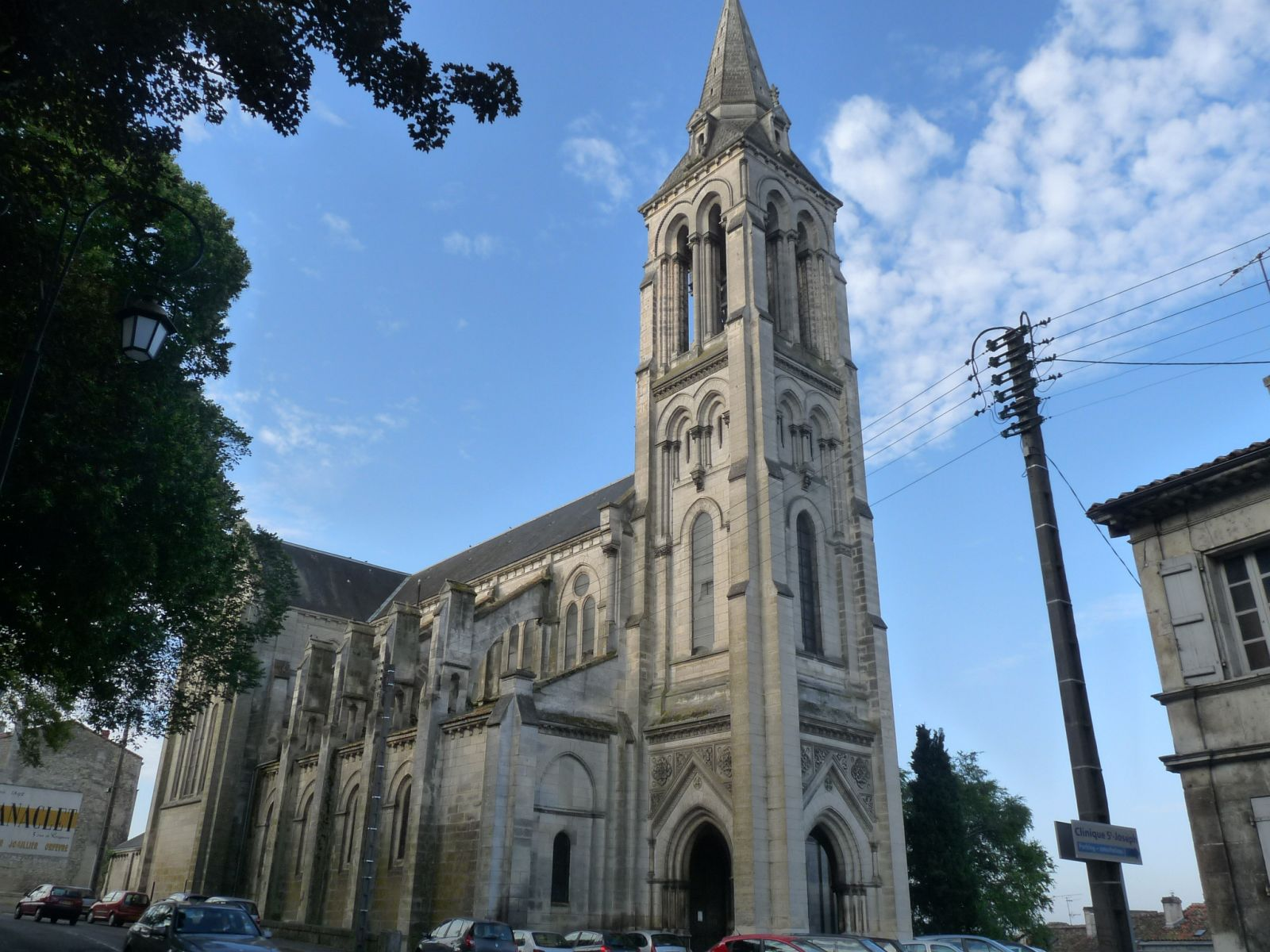
Church Saint-Ausone

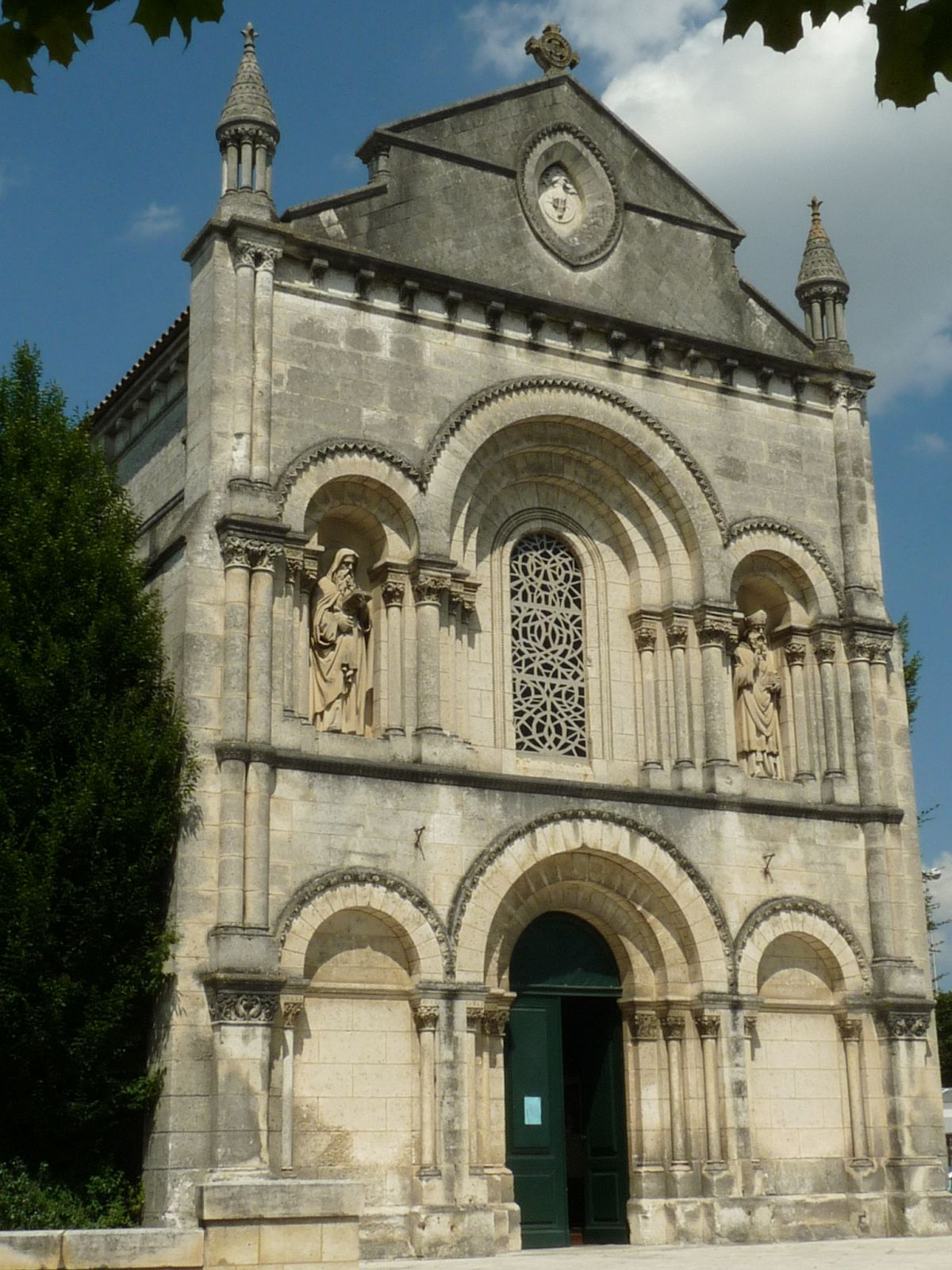
Chapel Saint-Cybard

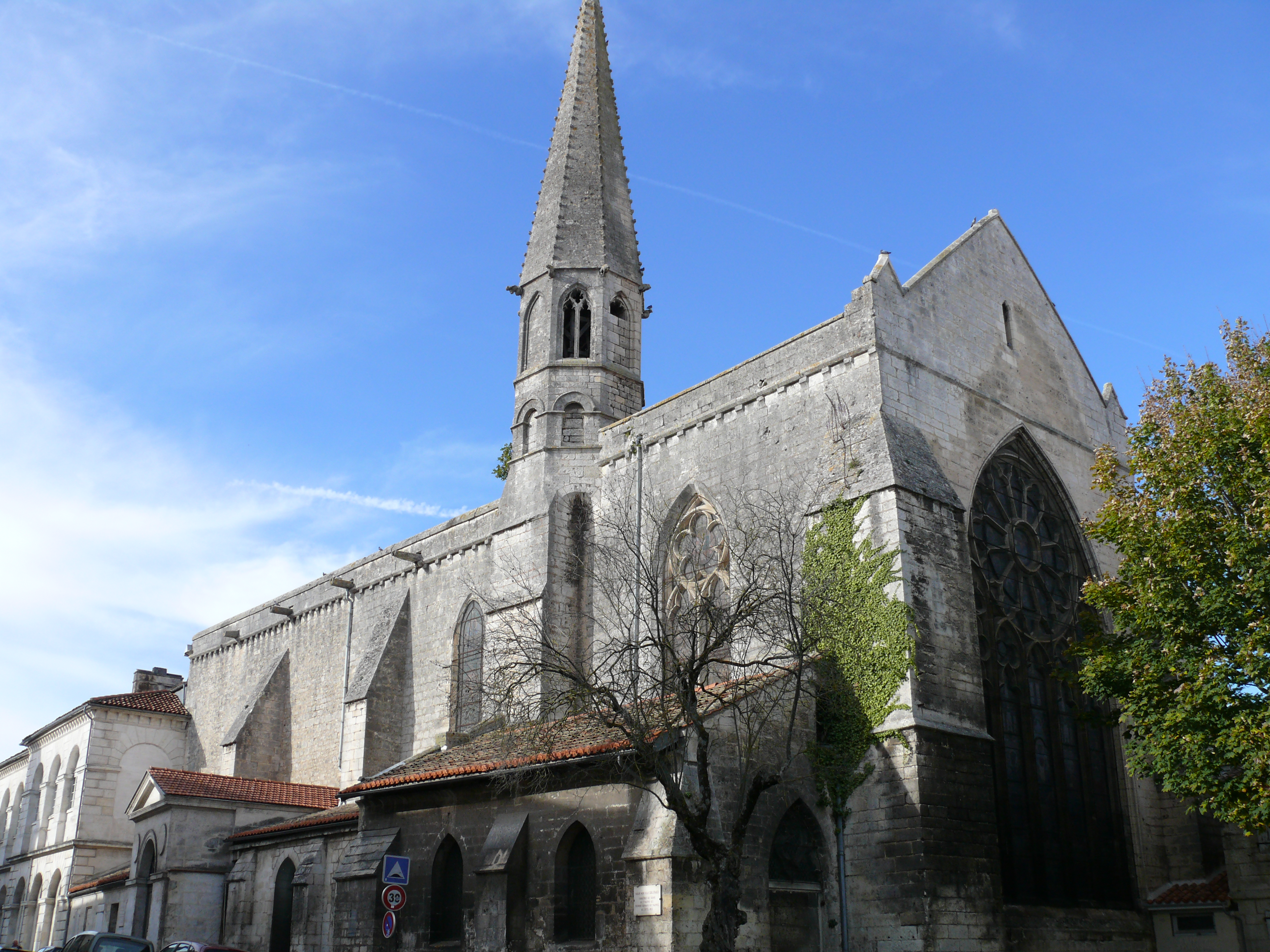
Chapel of Cordeliers

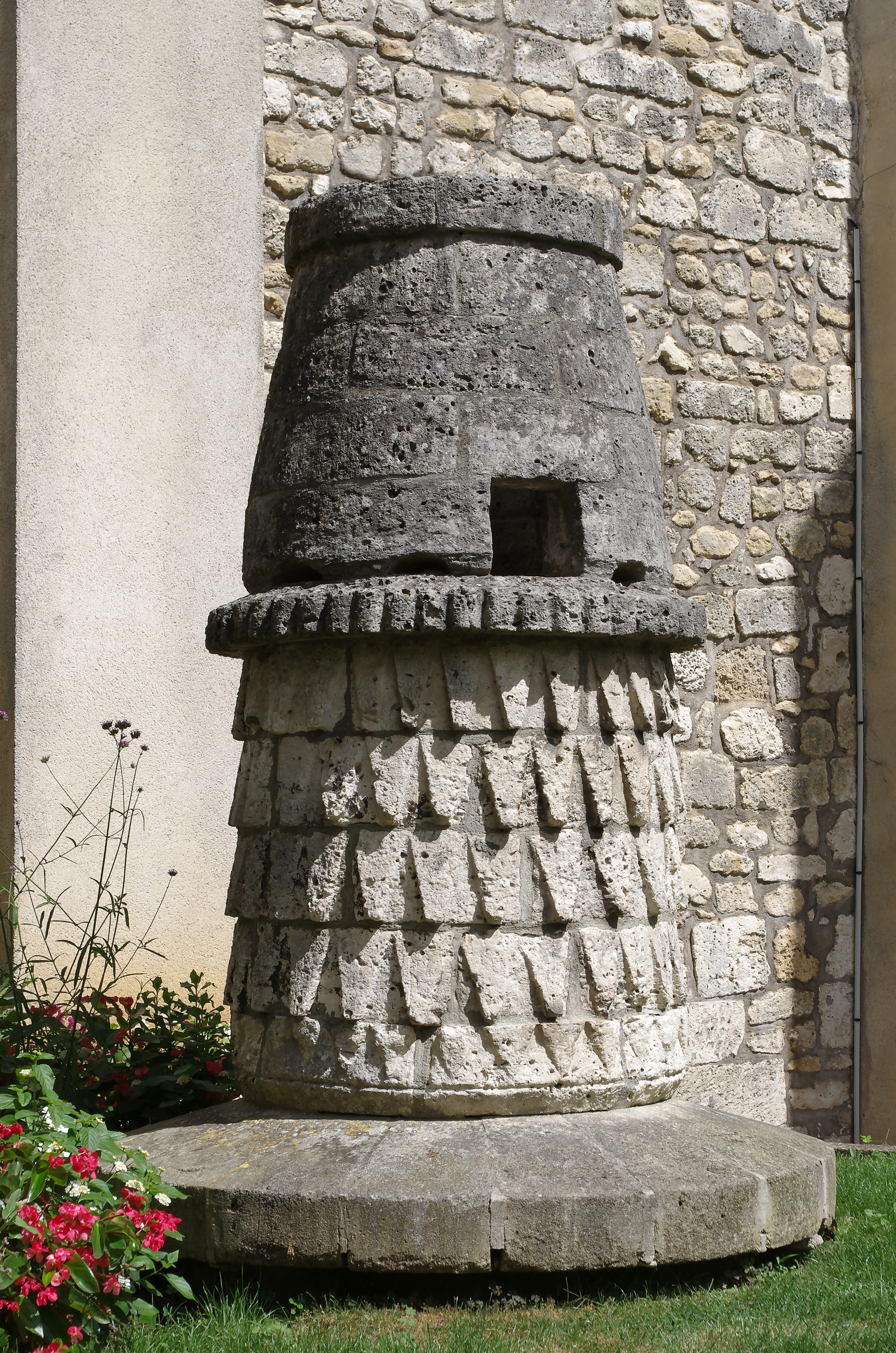
"Lantern of the dead" near the Church of Saint-André

=== Environmental heritage ===
The valley of the Charente upstream from Angoulême is a Natura 2000 zone with remarkable species: 64 species of birds. Among them are species for marshland and wetland; and at Angoulême it is common to see wildfowl including mute swan, black-necked grebe, little grebe, horned grebe, great crested grebe, greylag goose, gadwall, pintail, Eurasian wigeon, shoveler, garganey, teal and common pochard, tufted duck on the Charente. It is more rare to see waders. Terns and great cormorants return during periods of storms from far upstream on the river.

Marquet island and the Forest of la Pudrerie have been finally cleared and will be provided to the population.

Hiking trails and an old haulage road have become part of the green corridor which allows walks along the river.

=== Museums ===
- Museum of Angoulême
- Museum of Paper
- Museum of the Archaeological and Historical Society of Charente
- Museum of Resistance and Deportation
- Museum of Cartoons (CIBDI)
- Decentralized branch of the Regional Contemporary Art Fund of Poitou-Charentes

=== Cartoons ===
In 1983 the Regional School of Fine Arts in Angoulême (EESI) was created with the first cartoon section in France. Angoulême is home to the International City of Cartoons and Images which registers all the comics published in France. There is also at la Cité the ENJMIN which is the first state-funded school in Europe for the key subjects of video games and interactive media.

- Angoulême, known as the "City of the Image" or "Capital of Cartoons", is known for its "Painted walls" of cartoons "that punctuate the city centre.

=== Other cultural places ===
- The National Theatre
- The Espace Carat' (Exhibition and Convention Centre of Grand Angoulême - events, concerts)
- La Nef (Concert Hall)
- Gabriel Faure conservatory which has an auditorium and a library
- The Alpha, a library currently under construction (opening scheduled for March 2014)

=== Schedule of festivals ===
End of January: Angoulême International Comics Festival, Early June: Musiques Métisses (Mixed Music), Late August: Angoulême Francophone Film Festival, September: Circuit des Remparts (Car Race), Late October: Piano en Valois, Late November: Gastronomades, Early November: The Grand Dance Festival

=== City of festivals ===
Angoulême, along with paper and printing, has long been associated with animation, illustration and the graphic arts. The Cité internationale de la Bande Dessinée et de l'Image includes an exhibition space and cinema in a converted brewery down by the river. A new museum dedicated to the motion picture opened in 2007 at the newly restored chais on opposite side of the river at Saint Cybard. The architect was Jean-François Bodin. The Angoulême International Comics Festival takes place for a week every year in January and attracts nearly a quarter of a million international visitors.

Another festival, small yet influential, is FITA, held each December. FITA stands for Forum International des Technologies de l'Animation, International Forum for Animation Technologies. The event was started in 1998. French professionals from animation, effects, post-production and game development studios: SFX supervisors, head of studios, animators, technical directors, meet to share information and hear speakers on the latest advances and new ideas in entertainment technology.

The Circuit des Remparts motor racing event, with its street circuit around the ramparts and past the Cathedral, is held the Sunday of the middle weekend in September. It is also the occasion of the world's largest gathering of pre-war Bugatti race cars, usually around 30 cars, many being examples of the legendary T35, the Ferraris of their day. British vintage and classic cars are also in attendance, most having been driven to the event. The Saturday of the "Remparts" weekend includes a tourist rally (as opposed to a speed event) for classic and sporting cars, around the Cognac area.

In another international sports event, Angoulême was the site of the finish of Stages 18 and 19 (ITT) in the 2007 Tour de France.

Angoulême also hosts the Gastronomades festival at Christmas, Music Metisse in May and Piano en Valois in October.

A new exhibition centre (Le Parc Des Expos) and a new shopping mall at the Champ de Mars in the town centre (opening Sept/Oct 2007) are the latest additions to the town.

Angoulême is the seat of a bishop, a prefect, and an assize court. Its public institutions include tribunals of first instance and of commerce, a council of trade-arbitrators, a chamber of commerce and a branch of the Bank of France. It has several lycées (including the Lycee de l'Image et du Son d'Angoulême (LISA – High School of Image and Sound)), training colleges, a school of artillery, a library and several learned societies.

== Facilities and services ==
=== Education ===
==== Colleges ====
- Marguerite de Valois College
- Anatole France College
- Pierre Bodet College
- Jules Michelet College
- Jules Verne College
- Michèle Pallet College

==== Schools ====
- Lycée Guez-de-Balzac : general education school hosting literary CPGEs
- School of Image and Sound of Angoulême (LISA): a general education high school (options cinema, theatre), BTS audiovisual and visual communication
- Marguerite de Valois High School: general and technological lycée,
- Charles de Coulomb High School: a general and technological education and vocational high school (industrial education)
- Sillac High School: building trades vocational school
- Jean Rostand School: vocational school for the fashion industry and services,
- Jean-Albert Grégoire School: vocational school for careers in transport and logistics (Soyaux commune)
- Oisellerie High School: agricultural college (La Couronne commune)
- Saint Paul High School: A private school grouping (elementary school, middle school, and general and technological high school)
- Sainte-Marthe-Chavagnes School: a private school grouping (from kindergarten to BTS, general education, technological and professional)

==== University ====
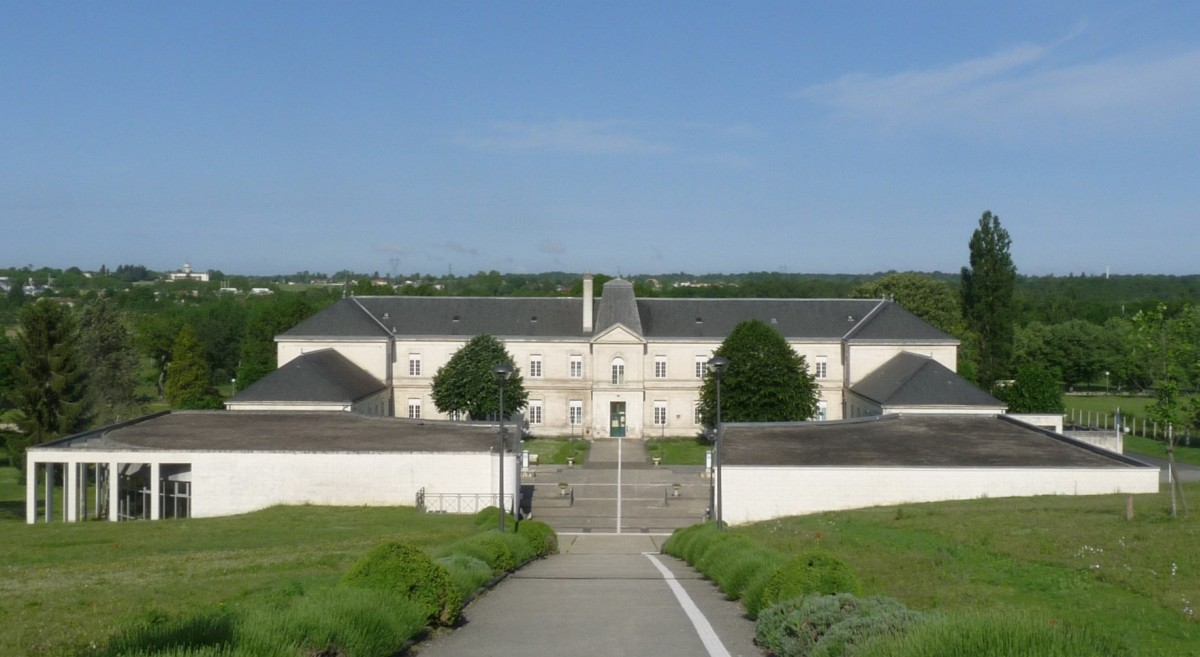
The Faculty of Law at La Couronne

The University Centre of Charente is administratively attached to the University of Poitiers. It includes:

- a Faculty of Law and Social Sciences
- a Faculty of Sport Sciences
- CEPE (European Centre for children's products)
- University Institutes of Technology (IUT)
- a departmental site of the Graduate School of Teaching and Education from the University of Poitiers

==== Other institutions ====
- Gabriel Fauré Conservatory directed by Jacques Pesi. 56 teachers, 40 disciplines, and 1,015 students in 2010
- Isfac: a training centre offering 8 BTS courses alternately as well as training for business
- CNAM: a branch of the National Conservatory of Arts and Crafts
- EMCA: School for film animation
- EGC: School of Management and Business
- CIFOP: Vocational Training Centre for the Chamber of Commerce and Industry of Angoulême (L'Isle-d'Espagnac commune)
- EIA: Engineering school by apprenticeship - CESI
- ENJMIN: National School game and interactive digital media
- EESI: Higher European School of Imaging
- CREADOC: documentary of design

==== Sports ====
- Local rock climbing crags in such as Les Eaux-Claires, site of France's first 9a (5.14d) route, by Fred Rouhling
- Sailing school, based by Éric Tabarly at the lake of Saint-Yrieix
- The women's handball team was in division 1 for the 2008–2009 season.
- The Angoulême CFC (ACFC) is the football club that played in the National (3rd division) in the 2003–2004 season.
- TTGF is the Table Tennis Club that played in National 1 (3rd division championship of France) for the 2009–2010 season.
- The SC Angoulême Rugby Club
- The ACA (Angoulême Rowing Club)

==== Health ====
All medical and paramedical specialties are present.

- The Centre hospitalier d'Angoulême, also called the Hospital of Girac, is in the commune of Saint-Michel.
- The Saint-Joseph clinic is the only remaining clinic in the commune of Angoulême. Other clinics (Victor Hugo, Sainte-Marie, Saint-Cybard, etc.) are combined on one site: the clinical centre of Soyaux.

== Local life ==
=== Worship ===
==== Catholic worship ====
- Saint-Pierre Cathedral
- Saint-André Church
- Church of Our Lady of Obézine
- Church of St. Ausone
- Saint-Jacques Church of l'Houmeau
- Church Saint-Martial
- Church of Saint-Bernadette
- Parish church of Saint-John the Baptist: the church is located on the Rue Pierre Aumaître
- Church of Saint-Cybard
- Church of the Sacred Heart

=== Markets ===
- The market of Halles, or Covered Market. With its large roof and its late 19th-century architecture, it has been registered as an historical monument since 1993.
- The Victor Hugo market
- The market of Saint-Cybard
- The districts of Basseau and Ma Campagne also have their markets.

== Military presence ==
Two regiments of the French armed forces are currently garrisoned in the City:

- 1st Marine Infantry Regiment
- The 515th régiment du train.

Several other military formations have been previously garrisoned in the city, including:

- The 107th Infantry Regiment, from before 1906 for an unknown period of time and then from in 1939 to 1940
- The 21st Artillery Regiment, 1906
- The 34th Artillery Regiment, 1906
- The 41st Divisional Artillery Regiment, 1939–1940
- The 502nd Tank Regiment, 1939–1940.

== Notable people ==
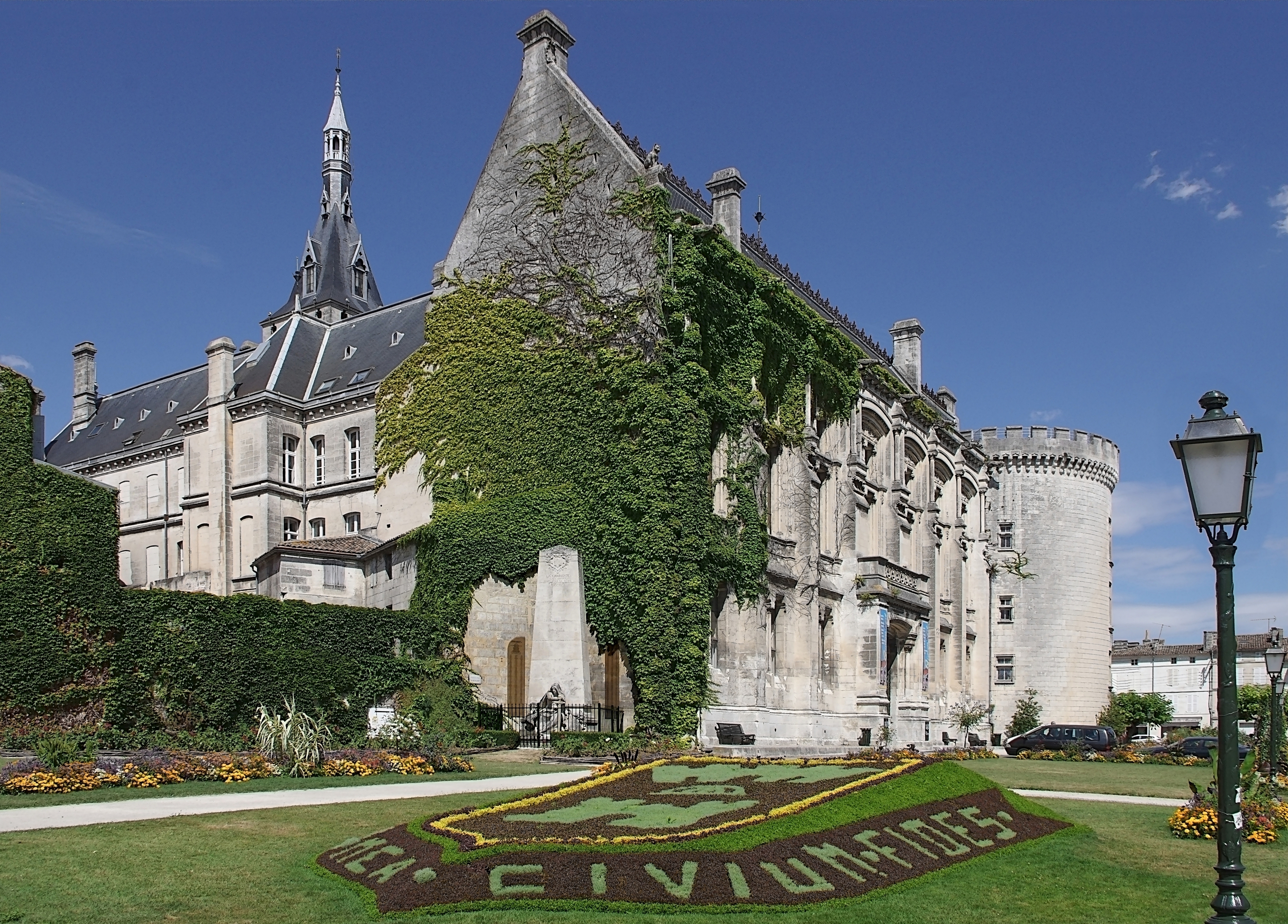
Angoulême City Hall

- Isabella of Angoulême (1186–1246), Queen of England as the second wife of King John
- John, Count of Angoulême (1399–1467), grandson of King Charles V of France and grandfather of King François I, buried in Saint-Pierre d'Angoulême Cathedral
- Mellin de Saint-Gelais (c. 1491–1558), poet of the Renaissance, favoured by Francis I
- Margaret of Valois-Angoulême (1492–1548), princess of France
- André Thevet (1516–1592), explorer, cosmographer and writer
- François Ravaillac (1578–1610), assassin of King Henry IV
- François Garasse (1585–1631), Jesuit polemicist
- Jean-Louis Guez de Balzac (1597–1654), writer
- Marc René, marquis de Montalembert (1714–1800), military engineer and writer
- Jean-Baptiste Vallin de la Mothe (1728–1799), court architect to Catherine II in Russia
- Charles-Augustin de Coulomb (1736–1806), military engineer and physicist
- Charles Gaudichaud-Beaupré (1789–1854), botanist
- Curt John Ducasse (1881–1969), philosopher
- Paul Iribe (1883–1935), illustrator and designer in the decorative arts
- Maurice Dumesnil (1884–1974), classical pianist
- Robert Couturier (1905–2008), sculptor
- Maurice Duverger (1917–2014), jurist, sociologist, political scientist and politician
- Pierre-Jean Rémy (1937–2010), writer, member of the Académie française
- Claude Arpi (born 1949), writer, journalist, historian and French tibetologist
- Dominique Bagouet (1951–1992), dancer and choreographer of contemporary dance
- Claire Désert (born 1967), classical pianist
- Jean-Cédric Maspimby (born 1977), footballer
- Amandine Bourgeois (born 1979), singer

=== Linked to the city ===
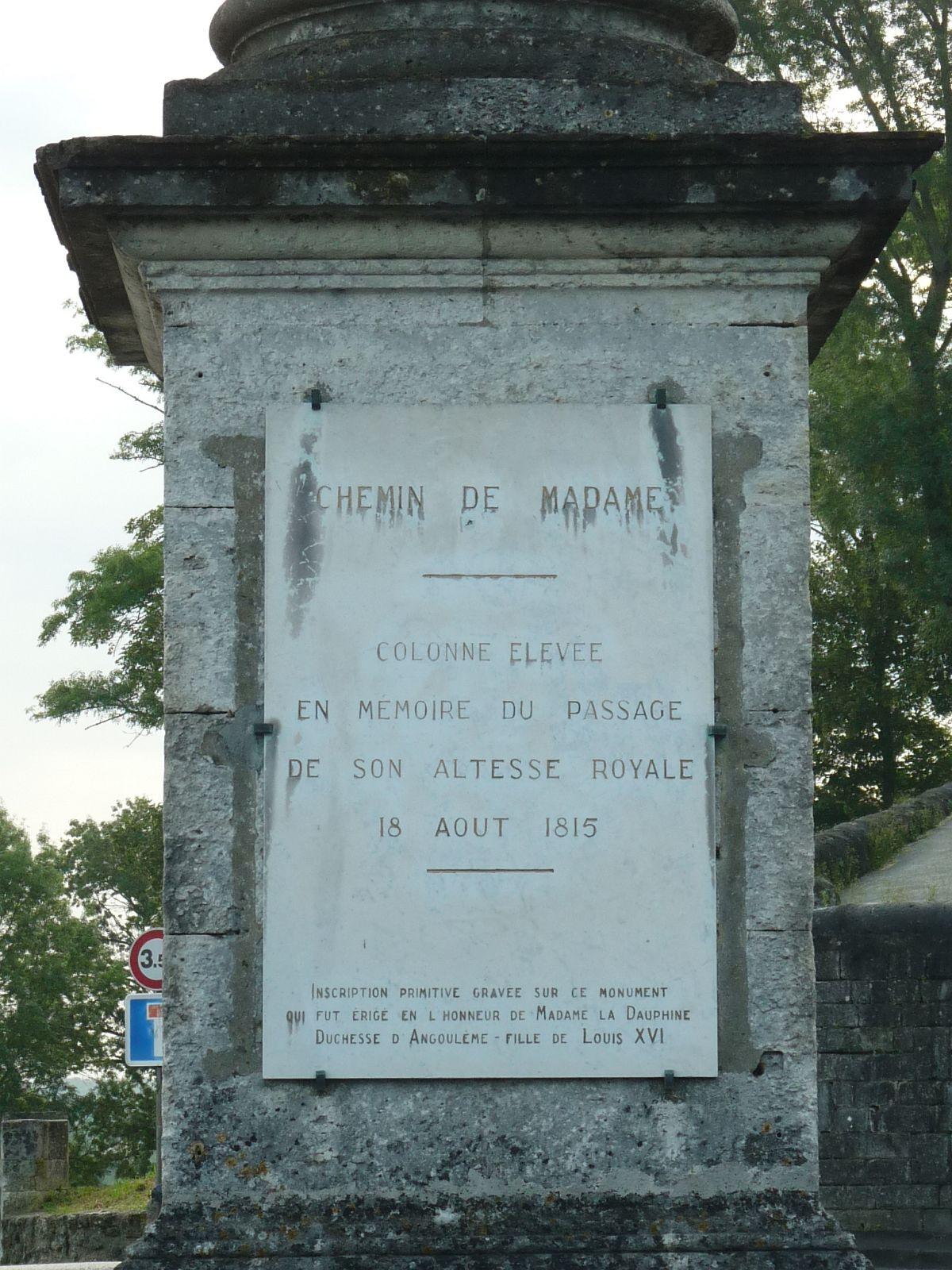
Column of the Duchess of Angoulême (1815), sister of Louis XVI

- Saint Cybard (504–581), monk and hermit, lived and died here
- Francis I of France (1494–1547), Count of Angoulême before his accession to the throne
- Jean Louis de Nogaret de La Valette (1554–1642), Duke of Épernon, Governor of Angoumois, pet of King Henry III of France
- Zulma Carraud (1796–1889), writer, lived here in 1830–1834 and frequently hosted Honoré de Balzac who wrote La Grenadière here in one night
- Paul Abadie (1812–1884), architect, built the churches of Saint-Martial, St. Ausone, the school chapel, restored the old castle and turned it into the city hall, and Angoulême Cathedral
- Paul Valéry (1871–1945), writer and scholar, visited the ramparts where there is a plaque: "Paul VALERY stopped here on 9 December 1931 AAC O reward after a thought, a long look at the calm of the gods
- Lucien Loizeau (1879–1978), general and writer, died here
- René Olry (1880–1944), general and commander of the Army of the Alps, died here
- François Mitterrand (1916–1996), French President (1981–1995), completed his secondary education at Saint-Paul's College of Angoulême
- Lindsay Anderson (1923–1994), British film director, died here
- Prince Eudes, Duke of Angoulême (born 1968)

== See also ==
- Angoulême International Comics Festival
- Counts and dukes of Angoulême
- Angoumois
- Bishopric of Angoulême
- Poitou-Charentes
- Communes of the Charente department
- Nouvelle-Angoulême
- Angolemi
