= Cantons of the Charente department =

The following is a list of the 19 cantons of the Charente department, in France, following the French canton reorganisation which came into effect in March 2015:

- Angoulême-1
- Angoulême-2
- Angoulême-3
- Boëme-Échelle
- Boixe-et-Manslois
- Charente-Bonnieure
- Charente-Champagne
- Charente-Nord
- Charente-Sud
- Charente-Vienne
- Cognac-1
- Cognac-2
- La Couronne
- Gond-Pontouvre
- Jarnac
- Touvre-et-Braconne
- Tude-et-Lavalette
- Val de Nouère
- Val de Tardoire
