= Nicole Bonnefoy =

French politician

Member of the French Senate for Charente
- Incumbent
- Assumed office 1 October 2008
- Parliamentary group: SOC (2008—2015); SOCR (2015—2020); SEC (2020—present)

Departmental Councillor of Charente
- Incumbent
- Assumed office 16 March 2008
- Constituency: Canton of Mansle (2008—2015); Canton of Boixe-et-Manslois (2015—present)

Regional Councillor of Poitou-Charentes
- In office 5 March 1998 – 30 September 2008

Personal details
- Born: 11 August 1958 (age 67) Saint-Flour, France
- Party: Socialist Party
- Occupation: Parliamentary assistant

Nicole Bonnefoy (born 11 August 1958) is a member of the Senate of France, representing the Charente department. She is a member of the Socialist Party.

== Biography ==
A parliamentary assistant for Jérôme Lambert, Bonnefoy was elected Senator for Charente on 21 September 2008. She was re-elected on 28 September 2014 and 27 September 2020.

During the 2015 Charente Departmental Election, Bonnefoy was elected in the Canton of Boixe-et-Manslois with Patrick Berthault. Their alternates are Bernard Lacoeuille and Christine Soury.

During the 2017 presidential election, she sponsored En Marche! candidate Emmanuel Macron.

== Summary of mandates ==
- Senator for Charente (2008—incumbent)
- Departmental Councillor of Charente (2008—incumbent)
- Regional Councillor of Poitou-Charentes (1998—2008)
  - Vice-President of the Regional Council of Poitou-Charentes (2004—2008)

== See also ==
- List of senators of Charente
