= Sentier botanique de Soyaux =

Arboretum and botanical path in Nouvelle-Aquitaine, France

Coordinates: 45°38′29″N 0°11′55″E

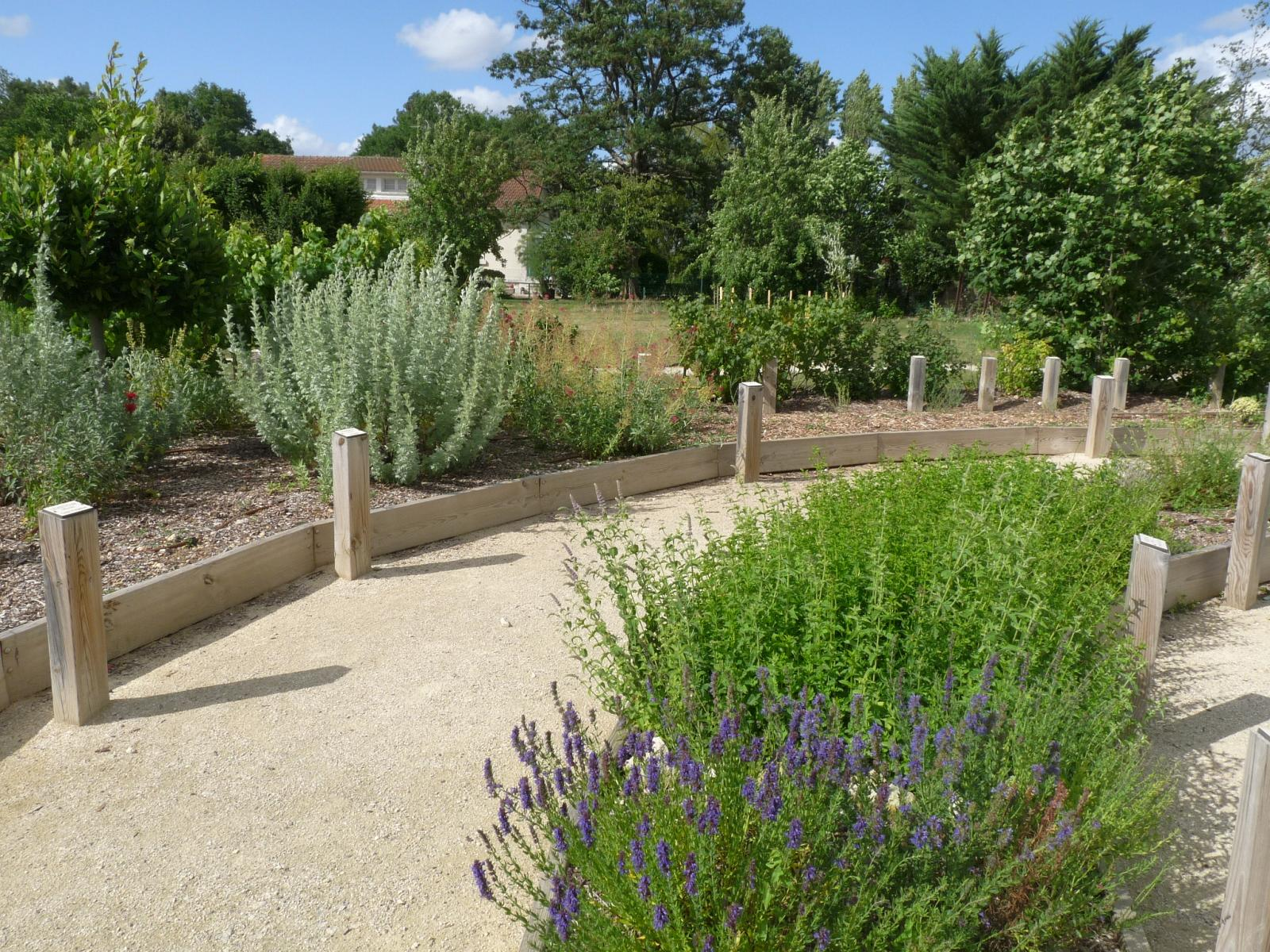
Sentier botanique de Soyaux

The Sentier botanique de Soyaux (200 metres long) is an arboretum and botanical path located on the Chemin de la Mothe, rue du Bourg, Soyaux, Charente, Nouvelle-Aquitaine, France. It was created in 2000 along the remains of a rural road, and planted with 42 species of regional trees and shrubs (32 deciduous, 10 evergreen). The path is open daily without charge.

== See also ==
- List of botanical gardens in France
