= Saint-Michel, Charente =

Saint-Michel
- Commune
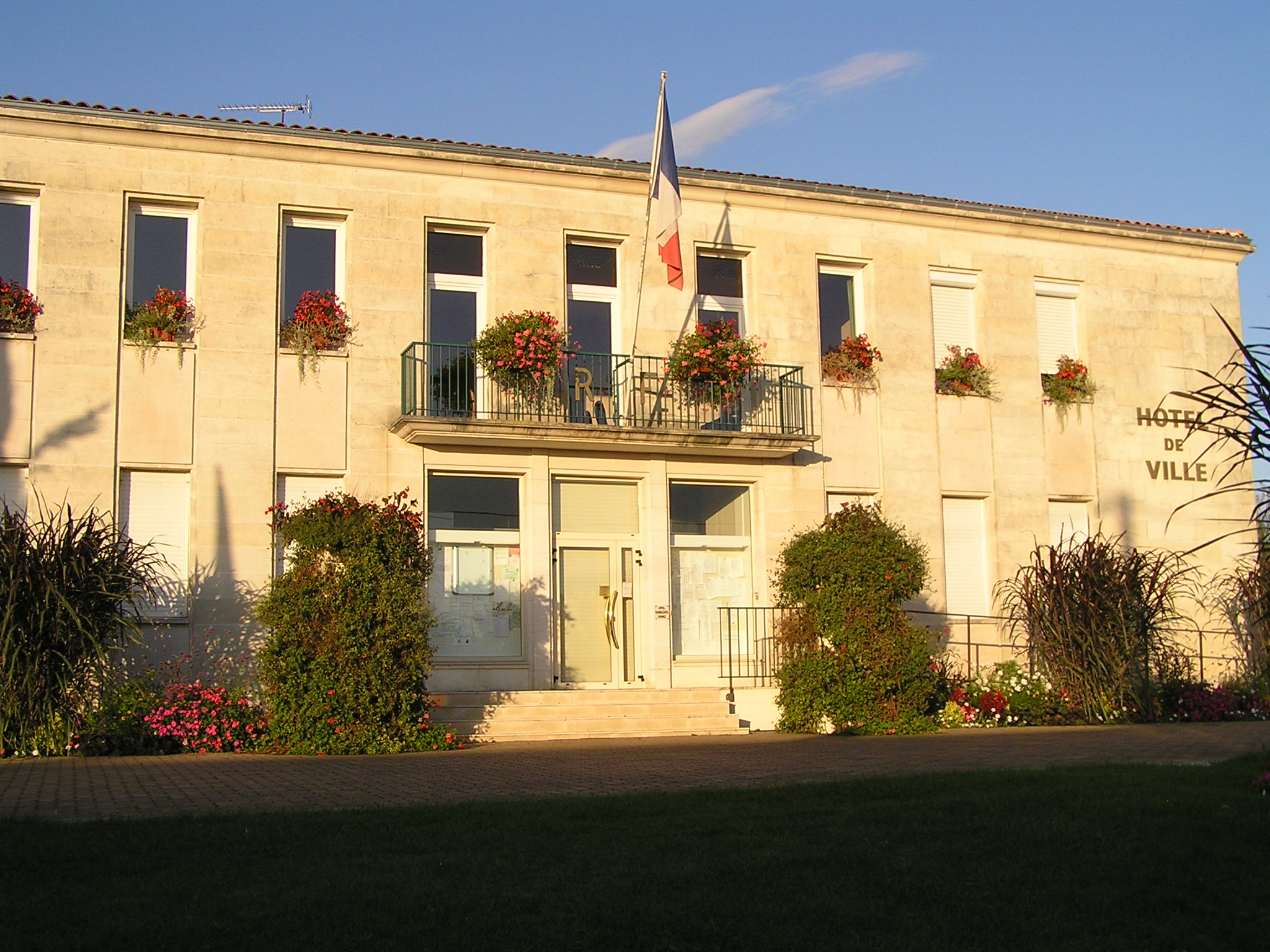
- Town hall

- Coat of arms
- Location of Saint-Michel
- Location within France Location within Nouvelle-Aquitaine
- Coordinates: 45°38′34″N 0°06′26″E
- Country: France
- Region: Nouvelle-Aquitaine
- Department: Charente
- Arrondissement: Angoulême
- Canton: La Couronne
- Intercommunality: Grand Angoulême

Government
  - Mayor (2020–2026): Fabienne Godichaud
- Area^{1}: 2.46 km^{2} (0.95 sq mi)
- Elevation: 33 m (108 ft)
- Highest elevation: 62 m (203 ft)
- Lowest elevation: 25 m (82 ft)
- Population (2023): 3,196
  - Density: 1,300/km^{2} (3,360/sq mi)
- Time zone: UTC+01:00 (CET)
  - Summer (DST): UTC+02:00 (CEST)
- INSEE/Postal code: 16341 /16470
- ^{1} French Land Register data, which excludes lakes, ponds, glaciers > 1 km^{2} (0.386 sq mi or 247 acres) and river estuaries.

Saint-Michel (French pronunciation: [sɛ̃ miʃɛl]) is a commune in the Charente department in southwestern France.

== Population ==
Historical population

Year	Pop.	±% p.a.
1793	391	—
1800	501	+3.60%
1806	346	−5.98%
1821	491	+2.36%
1831	491	+0.00%
1841	591	+1.87%
1846	569	−0.76%
1851	519	−1.82%
1856	553	+1.28%
1861	676	+4.10%
1866	782	+2.96%
1872	773	−0.19%
1876	882	+3.35%
1881	985	+2.23%
1886	1,068	+1.63%
1891	1,302	+4.04%
1896	1,311	+0.14%
1901	1,246	−1.01%

Year	Pop.	±% p.a.
1906	1,209	−0.60%
1911	1,262	+0.86%
1921	1,296	+0.27%
1926	1,368	+1.09%
1931	1,534	+2.32%
1936	1,769	+2.89%
1946	1,960	+1.03%
1954	1,849	−0.73%
1962	2,305	+2.79%
1968	2,702	+2.68%
1975	2,846	+0.74%
1982	3,238	+1.86%
1990	3,125	−0.44%
1999	2,960	−0.60%
2007	3,078	+0.49%
2012	3,279	+1.27%
2017	3,227	−0.32%
2023	3,196	−0.16%

Source: EHESS and INSEE (1968-2023)

== See also ==
- Communes of the Charente department
