= Puymoyen =

- Commune
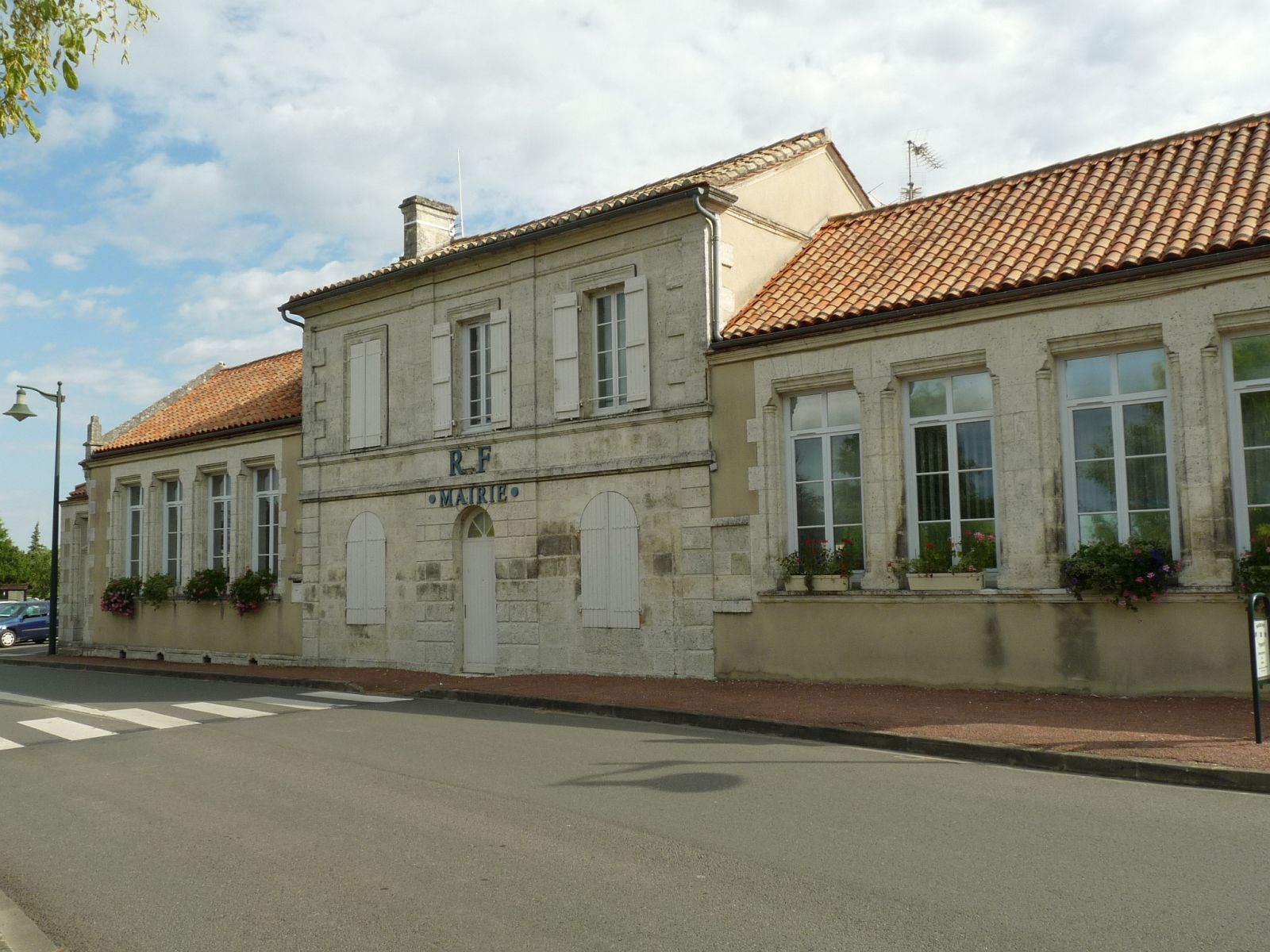
- Town hall

- Coat of arms
- Location of Puymoyen
- Location within France Location within Nouvelle-Aquitaine
- Coordinates: 45°36′52″N 0°10′55″E
- Country: France
- Region: Nouvelle-Aquitaine
- Department: Charente
- Arrondissement: Angoulême
- Canton: La Couronne
- Intercommunality: CA Grand Angoulême

Government
  - Mayor (2020–2026): Gérard Bruneteau
- Area^{1}: 7.26 km^{2} (2.80 sq mi)
- Highest elevation: 149 m (489 ft)
- Lowest elevation: 51 m (167 ft)
- Population (2023): 2,403
  - Density: 331/km^{2} (857/sq mi)
- Time zone: UTC+01:00 (CET)
  - Summer (DST): UTC+02:00 (CEST)
- INSEE/Postal code: 16271 /16400
- ^{1} French Land Register data, which excludes lakes, ponds, glaciers > 1 km^{2} (0.386 sq mi or 247 acres) and river estuaries.

Puymoyen (French pronunciation: [pɥimwajɛ̃]) is a commune in the Charente department in southwestern France.

== Population ==
Historical population

Year	Pop.	±% p.a.
1793	316	—
1800	315	−0.05%
1806	302	−0.70%
1821	337	+0.73%
1831	421	+2.25%
1841	407	−0.34%
1846	483	+3.48%
1851	496	+0.53%
1856	511	+0.60%
1861	526	+0.58%
1866	532	+0.23%
1872	519	−0.41%
1876	560	+1.92%
1881	519	−1.51%
1886	679	+5.52%
1891	705	+0.75%
1896	705	+0.00%
1901	685	−0.57%

Year	Pop.	±% p.a.
1906	658	−0.80%
1911	687	+0.87%
1921	753	+0.92%
1926	750	−0.08%
1931	743	−0.19%
1936	799	+1.46%
1946	272	−10.22%
1954	316	+1.89%
1962	314	−0.08%
1968	436	+5.62%
1975	841	+9.84%
1982	1,573	+9.36%
1990	2,258	+4.62%
1999	2,305	+0.23%
2007	2,401	+0.51%
2012	2,427	+0.22%
2017	2,377	−0.42%
2023	2,403	+0.18%

Source: EHESS and INSEE (1968-2023)

== See also ==
- Communes of the Charente department
