= Marie-Line Reynaud =

French politician

Marie-Line Reynaud (born 17 July 1954 in Barbezieux-Saint-Hilaire, Charente) is a French politician who was a deputy to the National Assembly of France for the second division of Charente department. She was first elected in 1997, lost her seat in 2002, regained it in 2007, then lost it again in 2017. Between her terms she served as a Member of the European Parliament for the west of France from 2004 to 2007.

Reynaud is a member of the Socialist Party, and sat with the Party of European Socialists in the European Parliament. She was a member of the Parliament's Committee on Constitutional Affairs and its Committee on Women's Rights and Gender Equality. She was also a substitute for the Committee on Civil Liberties, Justice and Home Affairs, a member of the delegation for relations with the Gulf States, including Yemen, and a substitute for the delegation for relations with the Korean Peninsula.

== Career ==
- Master's degree in public law and international and Community law (1979)
- Lawyer at the Information Centre on Women's Rights (1991–1997)
- Member of Jarnac Municipal Council (1989–1995)
- First Deputy Mayor of Jarnac (2002)
- Vice-Chairwoman, Pays de Cognac (2002)
- Member of the National Assembly for the second constituency of Charente (1997–2002)
- Vice-Chairwoman of the Mitterrand Donation, Jarnac (2002)
- Gold Medal of the Society for Promoting Good
- Blood donor's medal
