= Departmental Council of Charente =

Departmental legislature in France

Departmental Council of Charente Conseil départemental de Charente

Leadership
- President: Jérôme Sourisseau, MoDem since 16 September 2025

Structure
- Seats: 38
- Political groups: Government (18): DVD (8); UDI (4); LR (3); RE (2); MoDem (1); Opposition (20): DVG (9); PS (9); LÉ (1); PCF (1); www.charente.fr

The Departmental Council of Charente (French: Conseil départemental de la Charente) is the deliberative assembly of the Charente department in the region of Nouvelle-Aquitaine. It consists of 38 members (general councilors) from 19 cantons and its headquarters are in Angoulême.

The President of the General Council is Philippe Bouty.

== Vice-Presidents ==
The President of the Departmental Council is assisted by 11 vice-presidents chosen from among the departmental advisers. Each of them has a delegation of authority.

List of vice-presidents of the Charente Departmental Council (as of 2021)
Order	Name	Party	Canton (constituency)
1st	Jean-François Dauré	PS	La Couronne
2nd	Nelly Vergez	DVG	Tude-et-Lavalette
3rd	Fabrice Point	PS	Charente-Bonnieure
4th	Maryline Vinet	UG	Gond-Pontouvre
5th	Thibaut Simonin	UG	Gond-Pontouvre
6th	Fabienne Godichaud	PS	La Couronne
7th	Michel Buisson	UG	Touvre-et-Braconne
8th	Marie Pragout	UGE	Val de Tardoire
9th	Patrick Mardikian	DVG	Angoulême-1
10th	Célia Hélion	UG	Boëme-Echelle
11th	Patrick Gallès	DVG	Tude-et-Lavalette

== See also ==
- Charente
- General councils of France
