= List of senators of Charente =

Location of Charente in France

Following is a List of senators of Charente, people who have represented the department of Charente in the Senate of France.

== Third Republic ==
- Jean André (1876–1878)
- Auguste Hennessy (1876–1879)
- Guillaume de Bremond d'Ars (1879–1894)
- François Certain Canrobert (1879–1894)
- Édouard Martell (1890–1903) and 1912–1920
- Jean Laporte-Bisquit (1894–1903)
- Théophile Brothier (1894–1900)
- Paul Lacombe (1901–1903)
- Auguste Blanchier (1903–1912)
- Jules Brisson (1903–1912)
- Pierre Limouzain-Laplanche (1903–1928)
- Auguste Mulac (1912–1928)
- James Hennessy (1921–1945)
- Louis Delhoume (1928–1939}
- Léonide Babaud-Lacroze (1929–1945}
- René Gounin (1939–1945)

== Fourth Republic ==
- Mariette Brion (1946–1948)
- René Simard (1946–1948)
- Pierre Marcilhacy (1948–1959)
- Guy Pascaud (1948–1959)

== Fifth Republic ==
- Guy Pascaud (1959–1979)
- Pierre Marcilhacy (1959–1980)
- Alexandre Dumas (1979–1980)
- Pierre Lacour (1980–1996)
- Michel Alloncle (1980–1998)
- Philippe Arnaud (1996–2008)
- Henri de Richemont (1998–2008)
- Nicole Bonnefoy (2008–2020)
- Michel Boutant (2008–2020)
