= Fléac =

- Commune
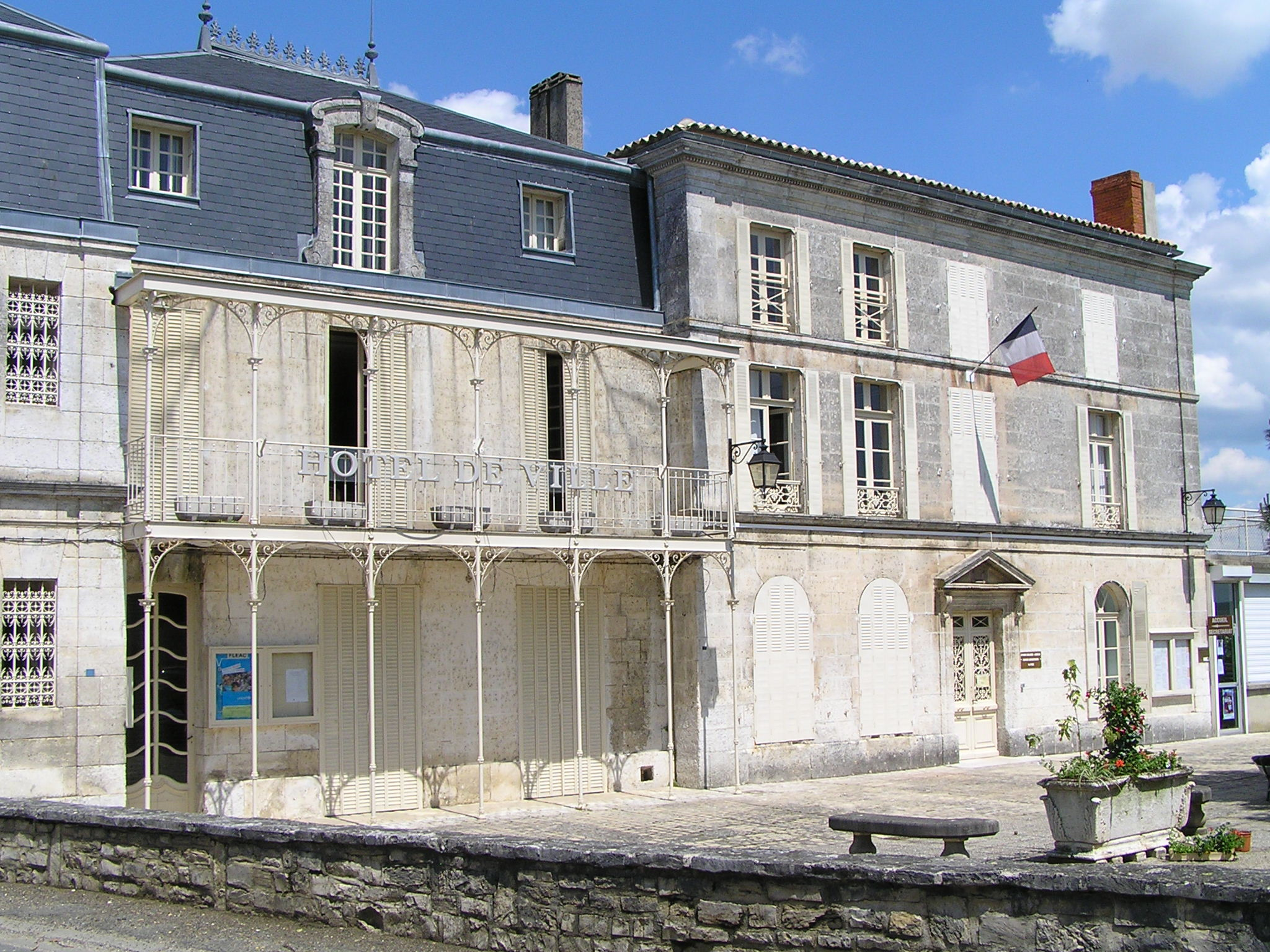
- Town hall

- Coat of arms
- Location of Fléac
- Location within France Location within Nouvelle-Aquitaine
- Coordinates: 45°39′58″N 0°05′41″E
- Country: France
- Region: Nouvelle-Aquitaine
- Department: Charente
- Arrondissement: Angoulême
- Canton: Angoulême-1
- Intercommunality: Grand Angoulême

Government
  - Mayor (2020–2026): Hélène Gingast
- Area^{1}: 12.60 km^{2} (4.86 sq mi)
- Elevation: 70 m (230 ft)
- Highest elevation: 112 m (367 ft)
- Lowest elevation: 25 m (82 ft)
- Population (2023): 3,861
  - Density: 306.4/km^{2} (793.6/sq mi)
- Time zone: UTC+01:00 (CET)
  - Summer (DST): UTC+02:00 (CEST)
- INSEE/Postal code: 16138 /16730
- ^{1} French Land Register data, which excludes lakes, ponds, glaciers > 1 km^{2} (0.386 sq mi or 247 acres) and river estuaries.

Fléac (French pronunciation: [fleak]) is a commune in the Charente department in southwestern France.

== Population ==
Historical population

Year	Pop.	±% p.a.
1793	751	—
1800	993	+4.07%
1806	802	−3.50%
1821	845	+0.35%
1831	882	+0.43%
1841	819	−0.74%
1846	819	+0.00%
1851	845	+0.63%
1856	785	−1.46%
1861	783	−0.05%
1866	820	+0.93%
1872	780	−0.83%
1876	804	+0.76%
1881	849	+1.10%
1886	789	−1.46%
1891	926	+3.25%
1896	842	−1.88%
1901	859	+0.40%

Year	Pop.	±% p.a.
1906	874	+0.35%
1911	854	−0.46%
1921	968	+1.26%
1926	977	+0.19%
1931	999	+0.45%
1936	1,023	+0.48%
1946	1,104	+0.76%
1954	1,229	+1.35%
1962	1,327	+0.96%
1968	1,417	+1.10%
1975	1,819	+3.63%
1982	2,588	+5.17%
1990	2,704	+0.55%
1999	2,904	+0.80%
2007	3,518	+2.43%
2012	3,613	+0.53%
2017	3,742	+0.70%
2023	3,861	+0.52%

Source: EHESS and INSEE (1968–2023)

== See also ==
- Communes of the Charente department
