= Bourg-Charente =

- Commune
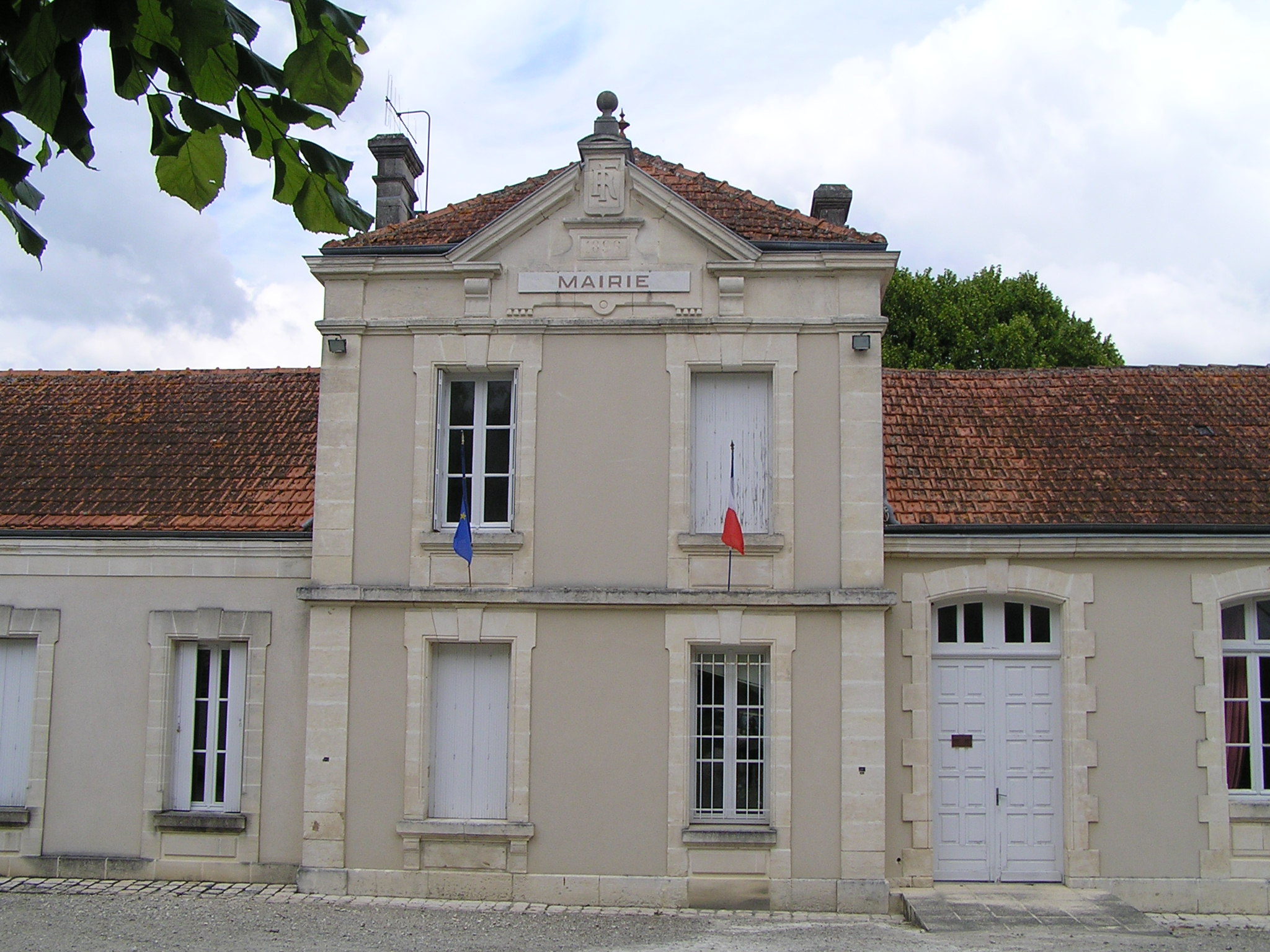
- Town hall

- Coat of arms
- Location of Bourg-Charente
- Location within France Location within Nouvelle-Aquitaine
- Coordinates: 45°40′25″N 0°13′11″W
- Country: France
- Region: Nouvelle-Aquitaine
- Department: Charente
- Arrondissement: Cognac
- Canton: Jarnac
- Intercommunality: CA Grand Cognac

Government
  - Mayor (2021–2026): Jérôme Sourisseau
- Area^{1}: 12.02 km^{2} (4.64 sq mi)
- Elevation: 12 m (39 ft)
- Highest elevation: 55 m (180 ft)
- Lowest elevation: 6 m (20 ft)
- Population (2023): 887
  - Density: 73.8/km^{2} (191/sq mi)
- Time zone: UTC+01:00 (CET)
  - Summer (DST): UTC+02:00 (CEST)
- INSEE/Postal code: 16056 /16200
- ^{1} French Land Register data, which excludes lakes, ponds, glaciers > 1 km^{2} (0.386 sq mi or 247 acres) and river estuaries.

Bourg-Charente (French pronunciation: [buʁ ʃaʁɑ̃t]) is a commune in the Charente department in southwestern France.

Its inhabitants are known as *Bourgeois* and *Bourgeoises*.

== Geography ==
=== Location and access ===
Bourg-Charente is situated in the Charente River valley, downstream from Jarnac and upstream from Cognac, 30 km west of Angoulême.

Access to the village is provided by the D 158 road, connecting from the RN 141—which links Angoulême to Saintes and forms part of the Centre-Europe Atlantique route. A network of secondary roads also allows travel to Jarnac in the east and Saint-Brice in the west via the right bank. Bourg-Charente is located 4 km west of Jarnac, 6 km north of Segonzac, and 9 km east of Cognac. Bourg-Charente is located 4 km west of Jarnac, 6 km north of Segonzac, and 9 km east of Cognac.

The nearest railway station is Jarnac station, served by TER regional trains bound for Angoulême, Cognac, Saintes, and Royan.

=== Localities and hamlets ===
There are many of these, including Tilloux, Chez Roland, Chez le Tard, Veillard, La Lêche, Le Logis, Les Voineaux, Le Brandeau, Margonnet, Le Pérusseau, Chez Genin, and Chez Réthoré.

A high, wooded cliff overlooks the left bank of the Charente River; from this vantage point, there is a vast panoramic view. On the right bank, the Château de Bourg stands atop a steep rocky outcrop; beyond it stretches the wide "Pays-Bas" plain. To the south, the Grande-Champagne region displays its vineyards, amidst which rises the slender spire of the church in Gensac-la-Pallue.

== History ==
The natural shelters at Le Dérivant were inhabited during the Stone Age, as evidenced by deposits of chipped and polished stone tools.

Pottery remains and numerous shards suggest the presence of potters in Bourg during the Gallo-Roman period, an era when the river served as the primary route for transporting goods.

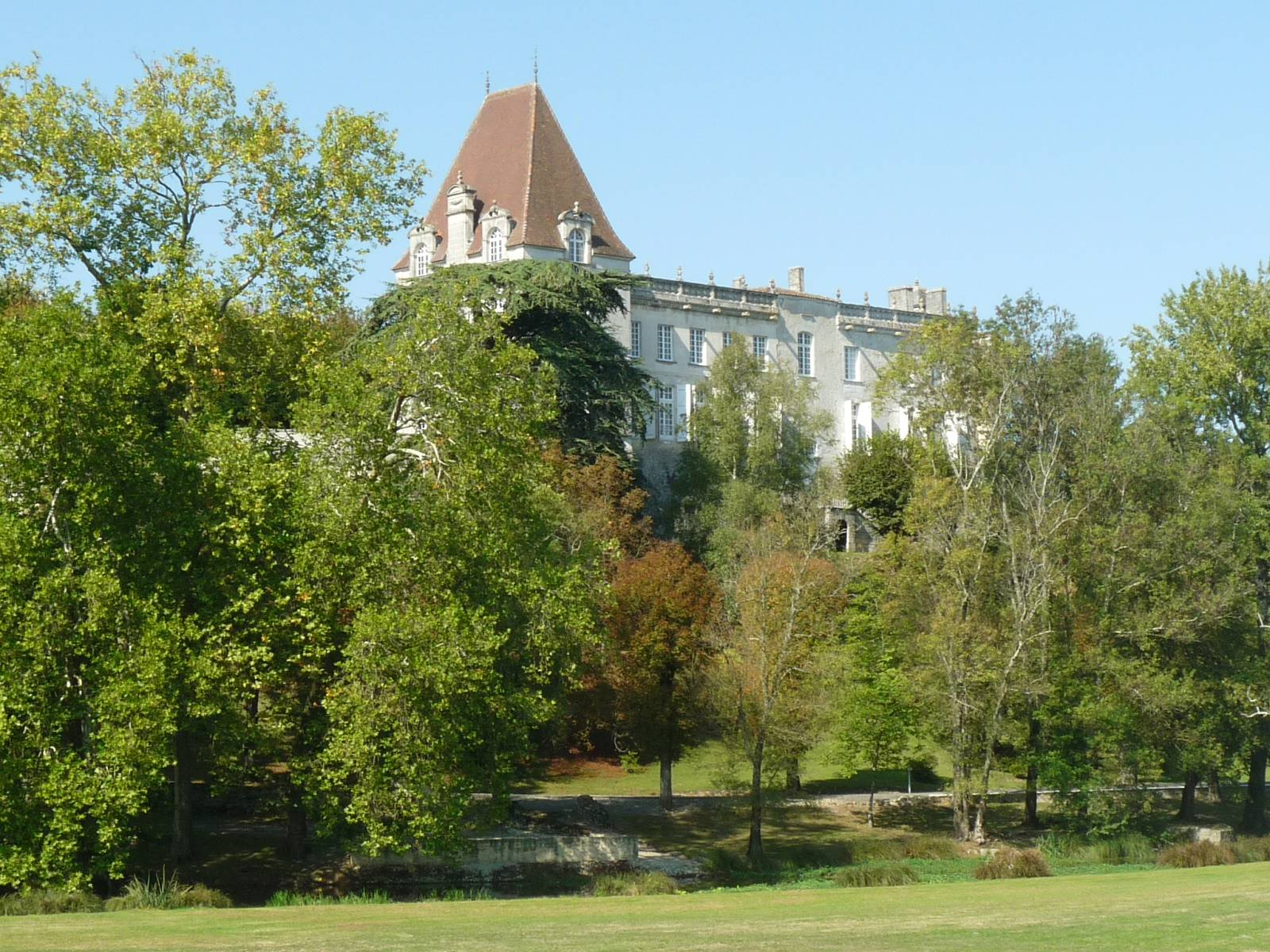
The castle seen from the park.

The former castle of Bourg stood on the left bank of the Charente River. It was the seat of a significant lordship that encompassed the entire parish of Bourg and included several villages in the parish of Gensac. Its holders bore the successive titles of lord, baron, count, and marquis.

In the 11th century, the Lord of Bourg participated in the construction of the church and the Abbey of Châtre<

During the Middle Ages, Bourg-Charente lay on a secondary east-west route used by pilgrims traveling to the shrine of Santiago de Compostela and the relics of Saint Eutropius in Saintes—coming from the Limousin and Périgord regions—a route that followed the Charente River through Angoulême and Cognac.

In 1262, Ollivier, the Lord of Bourg, became embroiled in a serious dispute with the Prior of Bouteville, under whose jurisdiction the church of Bourg fell. An agreement allowed the Ollivier family to retain the Château de Bourg. On August 19, 1363, Messire Ollivier, Baron of Bourg, paid homage to Edward of Woodstock—the Prince of Wales, known as the "Black Prince"—his new overlord.

After the English had established themselves at the Château de Bourg, the Marshal of Sancerre dislodged them in 1378 and destroyed the greater part of the fortress. The new castle was not rebuilt until the 16th century, at which time it was constructed on the right bank of the Charente, on the site where it stands today.

In the early 15th century, the lands of Bourg belonged to the Bragier family; one member, Pierre Bragier, served as mayor of La Rochelle in 1445. Following his marriage to Marguerite de Rohan, Count Jean d'Angoulême purchased the Bourg estate from the Bragier family; it remained part of the holdings of the Counts of Angoulême under Charles d'Orléans and Louise of Savoy.

After ascending the French throne, Francis I granted the Bourg estate to his former tutor, Artus Gouffier. The latter's grandson, François Gouffier—a Knight of Malta—sold the estate in 1607 to Pons de Pons, a former page to King Francis I; starting in 1607, Pons built the current château upon the foundations of the fortified castle that had stood on the right bank.

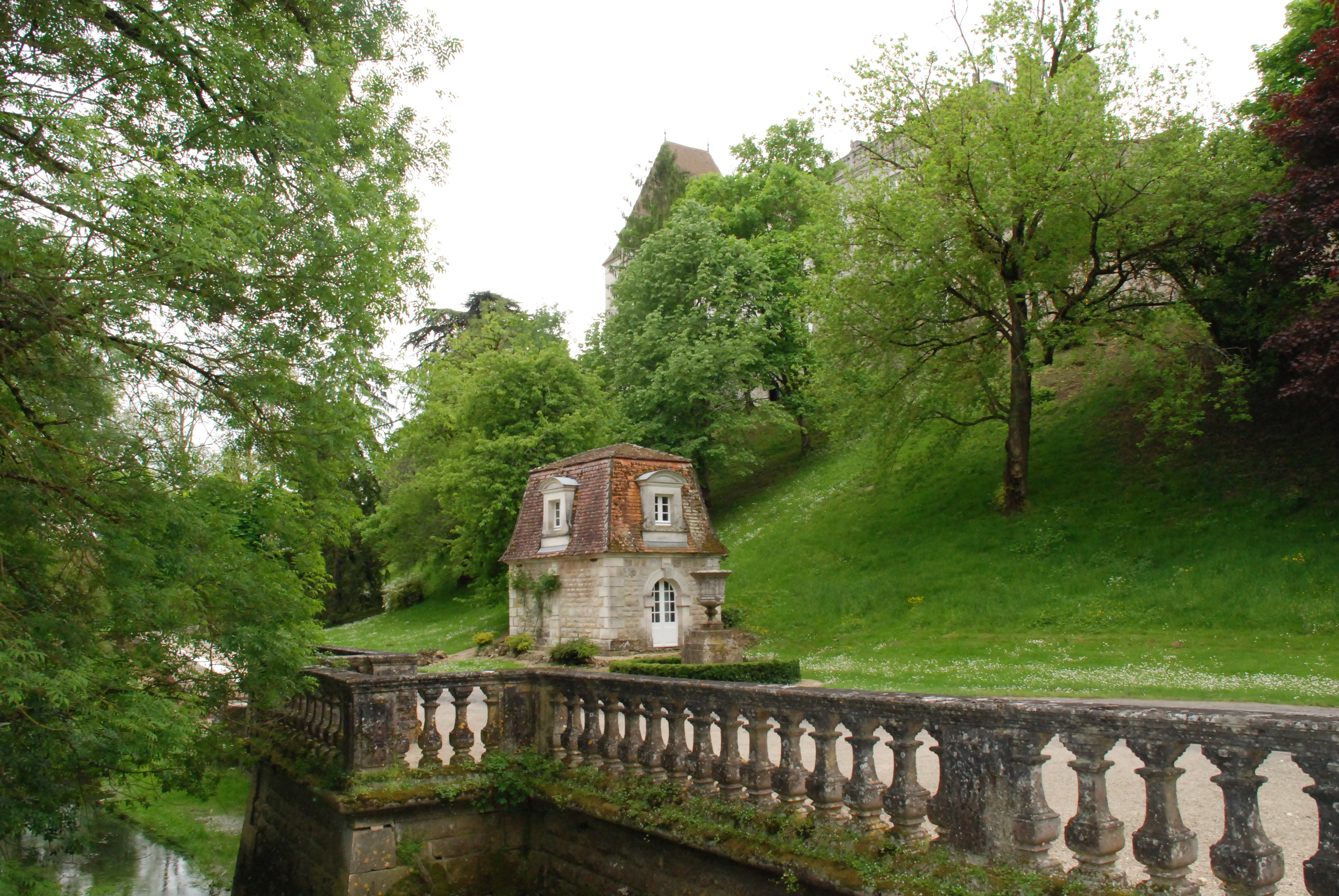
The entrance to the château.

As Pons's son, Renaud de Pons, died without issue, the lordship of Bourg passed to his daughter, Marie-Élizabeth de Pons, who had married François Almanieu d'Albret, Count of Miossens and Baron of Ambleville. The latter was a notorious duelist; he killed the Marquis de Sévigné in a duel in 1654 and was himself killed in a duel in 1672 by M. de Saint-Léger Corbon. In 1711, his widow sold the Bourg estate to two brothers-in-law, Messrs. Rambaud and Salomon.

In 1685, following the Revocation of the Edict of Nantes, nearly 250 abjurations were recorded, signed by Abbé Sabouin, the parish priest of Bourg. These records are marked by incidents such as that of Marie Feuillard, "who abjured very poorly, feigning insanity."

By the mid-18th century, the Bourg estate belonged to Jacques-Pierre Salomon, a royal councilor and president-treasurer of France at the finance bureau of the *généralité* of Limoges. The Salomon family sold the Château de Bourg in 1767 to the Marquis de Girac, who assumed the title of Marquis de Bourg.

On 7 March 1787, the representatives of Bourg-Charente at the preliminary assembly of the Estates General—held in the chapter house of the Récollets in Cognac—were Jean Archambaud and Jean Saunier.

The last lord of Bourg was François Michel Claud

== Population ==
Historical population
Year	Pop.	±% p.a.
1968	698	—
1975	708	+0.20%
1982	739	+0.61%
1990	722	−0.29%
1999	753	+0.47%
2007	713	−0.68%
2012	800	+2.33%
2017	904	+2.47%
2023	887	−0.32%
Source: INSEE

== See also ==
- Communes of the Charente department
