= Jérôme Sourisseau =

French politician (born 1974)

President of the Departmental Council of Charente
- Incumbent
- Assumed office 16 September 2025
- Preceded by: Philippe Bouty
- In office 16 October 2020 – 1 July 2021
- Preceded by: François Bonneau
- Succeeded by: Philippe Bouty

Personal details
- Born: 26 July 1974 (age 51)
- Party: Democratic Movement

Jérôme Sourisseau (born 26 July 1974) is a French politician. He has served as president of the Departmental Council of Charente since 2025, having previously served from 2020 to 2021. He has served as mayor of Bourg-Charente since 2008. In the 2012 legislative election, he was a candidate for the National Assembly in Charente's 2nd constituency.
