= Saft (company) =

French company

- Type: Subsidiary
- ISIN: FR0010208165
- Industry: Batteries
- Founded: 1918
- Founder: Victor Hérold
- Headquarters: Levallois-Perret, France
- Area served: Worldwide
- Key people: Cedric Duclos (CEO)
- Products: Design and manufacture of high-tech batteries for industry and defense.
- Revenue: €1.4 billion (2025)
- Number of employees: 4,500
- Parent: TotalEnergies
- Website: saft.com/en

Saft is a French company involved in the design, the development and the manufacturing of batteries used in transport, industry and defense. Headquartered in France, it has an international presence.

The company was established in 1918 and was public from 1924 to 1995 and again from 2004 to 2016 when it became a subsidiary of energy company TotalEnergies.

== History ==
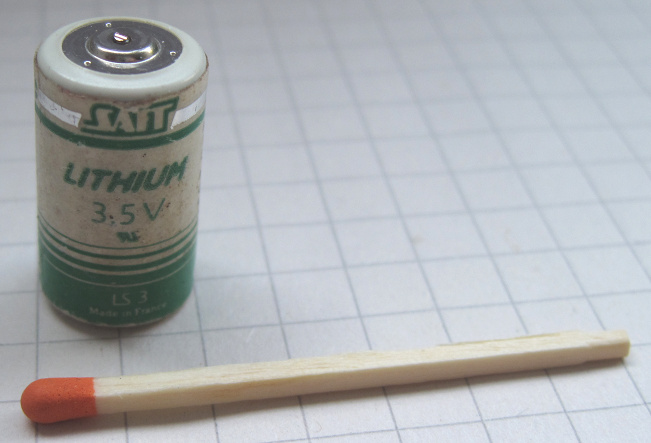
An old Saft ER14250 (½AA) lithium-thionyl chloride cell with a matchstick for scale.

=== Beginnings ===
The Société des Accumulateurs Fixes et de Traction (Saft) was founded in 1918, mainly by Victor Hérold, which since 1913 had been manufacturing batteries for the luggage carts that were used in railway stations and for the lighting of the locomotives from the Paris-Lyon-Marseille Company (PLM). In 1924, the company was partially listed on the Paris Bourse. In 1928, the Compagnie Générale Electrique (Alcatel) purchased it. In 1949, it introduced a new type of alkaline battery. The company widened its range of activities and markets, including power plants, telephone systems and industries in general. It introduced a revolutionary manufacturing system for sintered plates, which had a great impact in the aeronautic field. In 1953, the US Naval Air Command requested 2000 batteries of 24 V. The contract with the US military was of US$12,033,582 in 2025 dollars. In 1980, together with PSA, Saft conducted a study to evaluate the potential of using batteries to power electric cars. During the next years, investment was focused on building a sophisticated robotic assembly line.

=== Global growth ===
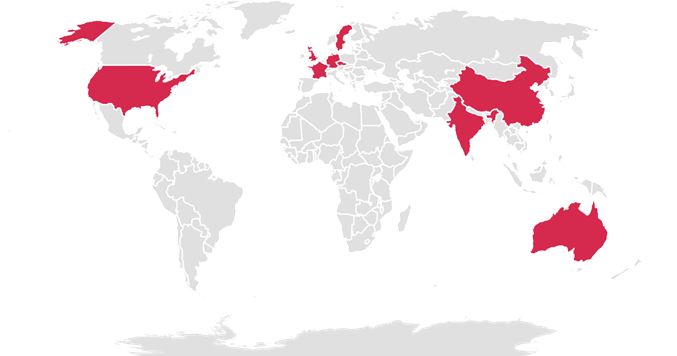
Global locations of Saft factories in 2012.

In the 1940s, Saft opened a subsidiary in the United Kingdom and, in the 1970s, one in the United States. In the 1980s, the company settled in Singapore and continued its expansion. It became the leading manufacturer of nickel-cadmium batteries both in the aviation sector and in the railway sector. In 1995, Alcatel delisted the company from the stock market and acquired a 100 percent of its shares. Later, Saft purchased Nife and Alcad, its main rivals, as well as the Czech company Ferak. In 2001 it suffered a setback and sold facilities in South Korea and Mexico. The same year it acquired from Invensys plc the American company Hawker Eternacell, a leading provider of lithium batteries to the American and British armed forces. It also took control of the American company ASB and Sonnenschein Lithium. In 2003, it purchased German company Friemann und Wolf Batterietechnik GmbH (Friwo), and the assets of Emisa and Centra, from Exide.

=== Doughty Hanson Funds era ===
In 2004, the private equity firm Doughty Hanson Funds purchased from Alcatel, at a cost of 900 million euros, a 100 percent stake in Saft, and listed it on the Euronext in June. In July 2005, Saft agreed the purchase of a 51 percent stake in AMCO Power Systems Ltd with its owner, Amalgamations Private Ltd. In January 2006 Saft and Johnson Controls Inc announced the launch of a joint venture named Johnson Controls-Saft Advanced Power Solutions LLC to develop, produce and sell advanced technology batteries for hybrid electric and electric vehicles. In February of that year, Saft purchased from Amalgamations Private its remaining stake in AMCO Power Systems, which was renamed AMCO-Saft India Ltd. In May 2006, EADS and Saft America, through ASB, formed the new subsidiary Advanced Thermal Batteries Inc located in Cockeysville, Maryland, with the purpose of supplying the military industry. In April 2007, Doughty Hanson sold all its stake in Saft, after an accelerated bookbuilt offering of 6.8 million shares by Goldman Sachs International at a price of 23.75 euros per share. Since then, the majority of the shares were kept on free float.

=== Rise and fall of the partnership with Johnson Controls ===
In January 2008 Johnson Controls-Saft opened the first production facility for lithium-ion hybrid vehicle batteries in Nersac, France. In 2009, Johnson Controls-Saft started the construction of a lithium-ion production plant in Michigan, while Saft built another for itself in Florida. Despite some signs of promise, Johnson Controls was increasingly dissatisfied with the restrictions of the agreement and also sought a more important ally. In May 2011, the American company requested the dissolution of Johnson Controls-Saft Advanced Power Solutions LLC to the Delaware Court of Chancery. The two companies agreed to the separation and Johnson Controls paid Saft 145 million dollars for its shares in the joint venture as well as for the right to use certain technology developed by it. Johnson Controls retained the Michigan facility built by the partnership. The French joint facility was transferred to Saft.

=== Projects and present ===
Saft wanted to accelerate its development through acquisitions in 2012 after cashing in on the end of its joint venture with Johnson Controls and refinancing debt. In February 2013, the Boeing's difficulties with the 787 Dreamliner made Airbus drop the use of lithium-ion batteries for its A350, which hit Saft because it had a supply contract with the aircraft manufacturer, though the company publicly denied a major impact.

In July 2013, Saft was awarded a $6.5 million contract to supply high power lithium-ion batteries for the Lockheed Martin F-35 Lightning II. Saft also supplies the battery for the Exagon Furtive-eGT, a four-seat electric sports car produced by Exagon Motors. The battery is capable of withstanding 3,000 charge cycles while conserving 80% of its capacity.

In 2016, the French company Total (later renamed TotalEnergies) acquired all Saft shares and delisted it from the stock exchange in August of that year.

In 2020 the Saft part of TotalEnergies signed for a joint-venture with the Stellantis Group in order to develop and produce Lithium cells for electric vehicles. This Automotive Cell Company (AAC) shall set up a pilot plant at Saft in Nersac, subsequently a gigafactory should follow in Douvrin, Hauts-de-France, and later in Kaiserslauten, Germany.

== Divisions ==
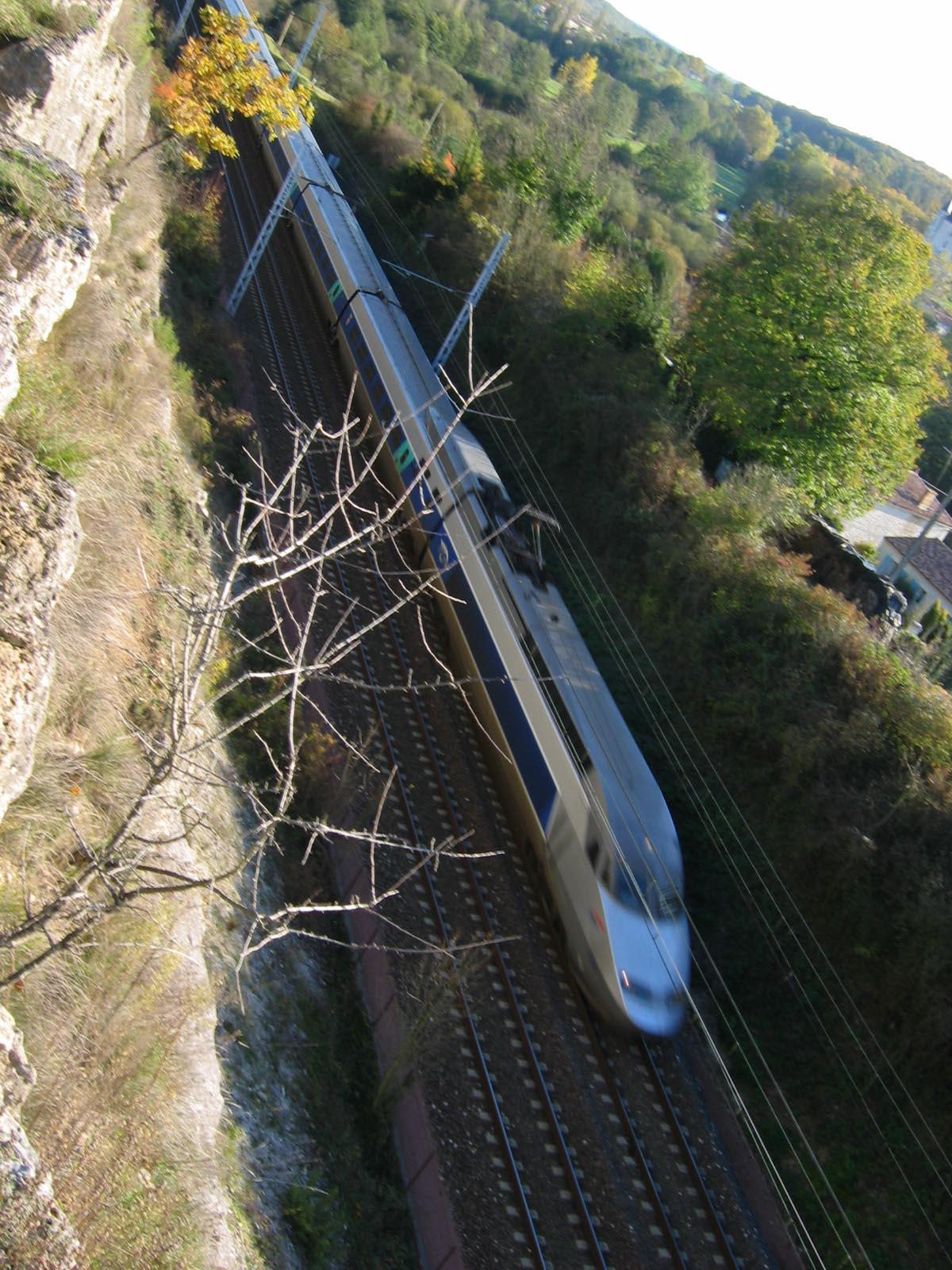
A TGV Atlantique train on its way to Paris. SNCF is one of the major clients of Saft.

=== Aerospace, Defense, and Performance (ADP) ===
The Aerospace, Defense, and Performance division produces nickel, lithium-ion, and silver-based batteries. The use of its products includes batteries for:

Aerospace

- Backup power and emergency systems.
- Engine and turbine starting for airplanes.
- Communications, scientific and observation satellites.
- Satellite launchers and space vehicles.

Defense

- Weapon systems & torpedoes.
- Military aircraft.
- Armored vehicles.

Performance

- Formula 1 and Formula E.
- Work boats and ferries.
- Cruise liners and luxury yachts.
- Cargo and offshore vessels.

=== Connected Smart Energy (CSE) ===
The Connected Smart Energy division produces primary lithium batteries (Li-SOCl_{2}, Li-MnO_{2}, Li-SO_{2}, Hybrid) and lithium-ion batteries. The use of its products includes batteries for:

- Smart metering.
- Electronic toll collection.
- Ecall.
- Asset tracking.
- Industrial Internet of Things.
- Medical devices.
- Portable military.
- Oil drilling.
- Environmental monitoring.
- Security systems.

=== Energy Storage Systems (ESS) ===
The Energy Storage Systems division produces lithium-ion batteries. The use of its products includes batteries for:

- Energy storage solutions for network services and renewable energies.
- Micro-grids for commercial and industrial applications.

=== Industry, Mobility, and Infrastructure (IMI) ===
The Industry, Mobility, and Infrastructure division produces nickel technology and lithium-ion batteries. The use of its products includes batteries for:

Industry

- Emergency backup power, starting power, and cycling applications in the Oil & Gas industry.
- Power generation and distribution.

Mobility

- Electrification of industrial vehicles.
- On-board rail backup power for lighting, air-conditioning, communications.
- Critical safety rail applications such as emergency braking and door opening systems).
- Railway on-board traction systems.

Infrastructure

- Railway signaling systems.
- Backup power for the telecommunications industry.
