= Kaolin deposits of the Charentes Basin =

Sedimentary clay deposits in France

The kaolin deposits of the Charentes basin in France are clay deposits formed sedimentarily and then confined by other geological structures.

== Overview ==
The geological unit called the Charentes basin is composed of Eocene and Oligocene deposits, laid above karstic limestone formations of the Campanian, in the north of the Aquitaine Basin. The Charentes basin is named after the departments of Charente and Charente-Maritime. The kaolin clays of Charentes belong to this mainly continental formation often referred as siderolithic, of which the principal outcrop is situated in the South of the Charente-Maritime department, 56 kilometres (35 mi) going north-east from Bordeaux city. The quarries are scattered along a 32 km (20 mi) long, 11 km (6.8 mi) wide, north - south band.

The clay concentrations of economic value are composed of a succession of clays, sands and pebbles. This torrential-stream deposit, close to enlaced rivers, laid to the deposition of sandy-clayey materials, with a variable iron content, coming from a lateritic weathering, of the French “Massif Central” granites. The presence of numerous lignite rich levels indicates that the deposit was performed in the presence of abundant organic matter, leading to important pedogenetic and diagenetic possibilities of evolutions. These chemical and mineralogical evolutions (dissolution–crystallization) allow the neo-formation of kaolin and gibbsite, as well as iron sulfide.

At their basement, highly enlaced and with channel shapes, those deposits often fill karstic depressions, leading to the formation of clay wells. The juxtaposition of features are sometimes without explanations using the deposition laws, probably in relation with post-sedimentary strain phenomena, eventually linked to substratum collapse. In the upper part of the series, the deposits are more regular, with lateral extensions up to several hundreds of meters.

Those complex geometries, with structures smaller than 20 meters, lead to particularly difficult recognition, estimation and exploitation phases. To this complex geometry, one should notice important lithology variations. The AGS company uses no less than 24 description codes and 8 colour codes, for its samples description. Those classes are subdivided to take into account the grade in organic matter, iron, titanium, potassium, the colour, and the aptitude to flow.

== Geometry of the retaining structures ==
The uncertainty in estimating the tonnage of mineral resources or ore reserves depends on a number of factors, and the uncertainty of definition of the deposit boundaries is one of them. In deposits with sharp contacts, the geometry may be relatively simple, nevertheless, there is always uncertainty caused by lack of information and large drill hole grid. Generally, these boundaries are determined by mineral grade rather than geological properties: deposit boundaries are chosen based on the cut-off grade. Changing the important factor of cut-off grade, the boundaries of the deposit can be extended or contracted. For this reason, even for the deposits with sharp boundaries, a clear definition of the cut-off grade and distinction between ore and gangue due to dilution during mining, the presence of intermediate layer and the limitation of mining in a selective way are essential. However, in the case of the exploitation of soft materials, extraction can be done more selectively and it would be easier to take into account the geological and geometrical limits. On the other hand, sometimes the uncertainty on the estimation of grades is bigger than the uncertainty on the boundaries definition. Estimation is then performed inside predefined boundaries. One can imagine that the anisotropy and structural complexity of the deposit are due to its geometrical form, while the geometrical dimension of the deposit help us to guess about its economical value.

Geometrical features can appear in variographic studies and usually they affect, or hide, grade distribution structures. The presence of a series of nearly homogeneous kaolin areas, linked together in zones, creates a mosaic effect. This phenomenon is due to the existence of periodical settling regimes of the rivers. The size of these zones can affect the form of the variogram and increase the nugget effect due to high differences of values in the edge of the zones. A hole effect is one of the other known phenomena caused by the presence of two or more separated lenses with low difference in grade and shape. The distance between these lenses can thus be estimated.

== Transformation during and after sedimentation ==
Thiry has mentioned that the actual geological setting of kaolin depositions cannot be explained with only transportation and sedimentation cycles. He also stated that the mineralogical sequences cannot be interpreted without local geochemical transformations. Kulbicki has proved the existence of vermicular minerals (kaolinite and dickite) incompatible with normal sedimentary sequences.

=== Influence of the organic materials ===
Lignite formations are relatively frequent in Charentes clay deposits. Their thickness changes between some decimeters in lenses, to metric scale in continuous forms. These organic materials had some influences on kaolin deposited layers. Some of the observed influences are as follow: In gathered samples close to these organic materials, clays generally do not contain mica minerals, and especially in the neighborhood of Cuisian lignite, kaolinite is very well-ordered and the clay does not contain swelling clays with hydrazine. Occurrence of gibbsite is always associated with these well-ordered kaolinites. Normally occurrence of hyper-aluminous clays due to the existence of gibbsite is one of the interesting subjects in the history of these kaolins. This causes many discussions about the origin of this mineral. The existence of gibbsite has been mentioned in the studies of Languine and Halm (1951), Caillere and Jourdain (1956), Kulbickie (1956), Dubreuilh et al. (1984) and Delineau (1994).

== Sandy overburden and intermediate sands ==
Generally, kaolin deposits have been covered with colored sequences of sand. In some quarries, we can observe red, green and some times black sands. The black color might be due to the existence of pyrite and organic materials. Sometimes fossil woods (floated branches and trunks of trees) can be found and with the coarse size of pebbles (several millimeters) are evidence of a high energy transportation. This type of sand can have some influences on the leaching by mineral and organic acids produced by pyrite and organic materials, of the lower kaolin deposits. Thiry has found that generally these kaolins contain rather well-ordered kaolinite. Obviously, the level of crystallization can control technical properties of kaolinite as well as the structural impurities. The high energy current can interrupt the continuity of the settled layers of kaolin and reduce the simplicity of the estimation methods.

== Gibbsite ==
Gibbsite is not stable in presence of quartz and it will be changed into kaolinite minerals, so gibbsite has formed after the deposition and we can call it neo-formation gibbsite. Now, the main question is about gibbsite formation in the middle of kaolin series. Due to the pH of leaching, a dissolution of Al_{2}O_{3} or SiO_{2} can occur (podzol or laterite profile) The first theory tries to describe this with podzol profiles: it assumes the leaching of silica from minerals and accordingly the gibbsite formation from leached kaolin. We thus should find the hyper-aluminous materials, containing gibbsite in the lower series of kaolin. On the other hand, a second theory proposes the procedure of aluminium leaching in a very acid medium, in deposited organic materials (lignite) with clay. The organic materials can accelerate the solubilization and transportation of aluminium ions with intervention of organic complex. proposed the following scenarios for this dissolved aluminium.

Dissolved aluminium can be transported with complex to a less acidic medium.

1- if there is any quartz in this medium, it can react, and we obtain well-ordered kaolinite minerals
2- In absence of quartz, aluminium will precipitate as a hydroxide mineral: gibbsite.

This theory alone cannot explain what is observed in-situ in the some samples of the “BD” deposit, where gibbsite was found in sandy layers containing quartz.
