= Bruno Périer =

French footballer (born 1966)

Personal information
- Full name: Bruno Périer
- Date of birth: December 28, 1966 (age 59)
- Place of birth: Soyaux, France
- Height: 1.72 m (5 ft 7 1/2 in)
- Position: Midfielder

Senior career*
Years	Team	Apps	(Gls)
1984–1985	Cognac	?	(?)
1985–1989	Chamois Niortais	4	(0)
1989–1991	Blagnac	?	(?)
1991–1993	Ancenis	?	(?)
1993–1996	La Roche-sur-Yon	?	(?)
1996–2000	Luçon	?	(?)
- * Club domestic league appearances and goals

Bruno Périer (born December 28, 1966) is a former professional footballer who played as a midfielder.

== See also ==
- Football in France
- List of football clubs in France
