= L'Isle-d'Espagnac =

- Commune
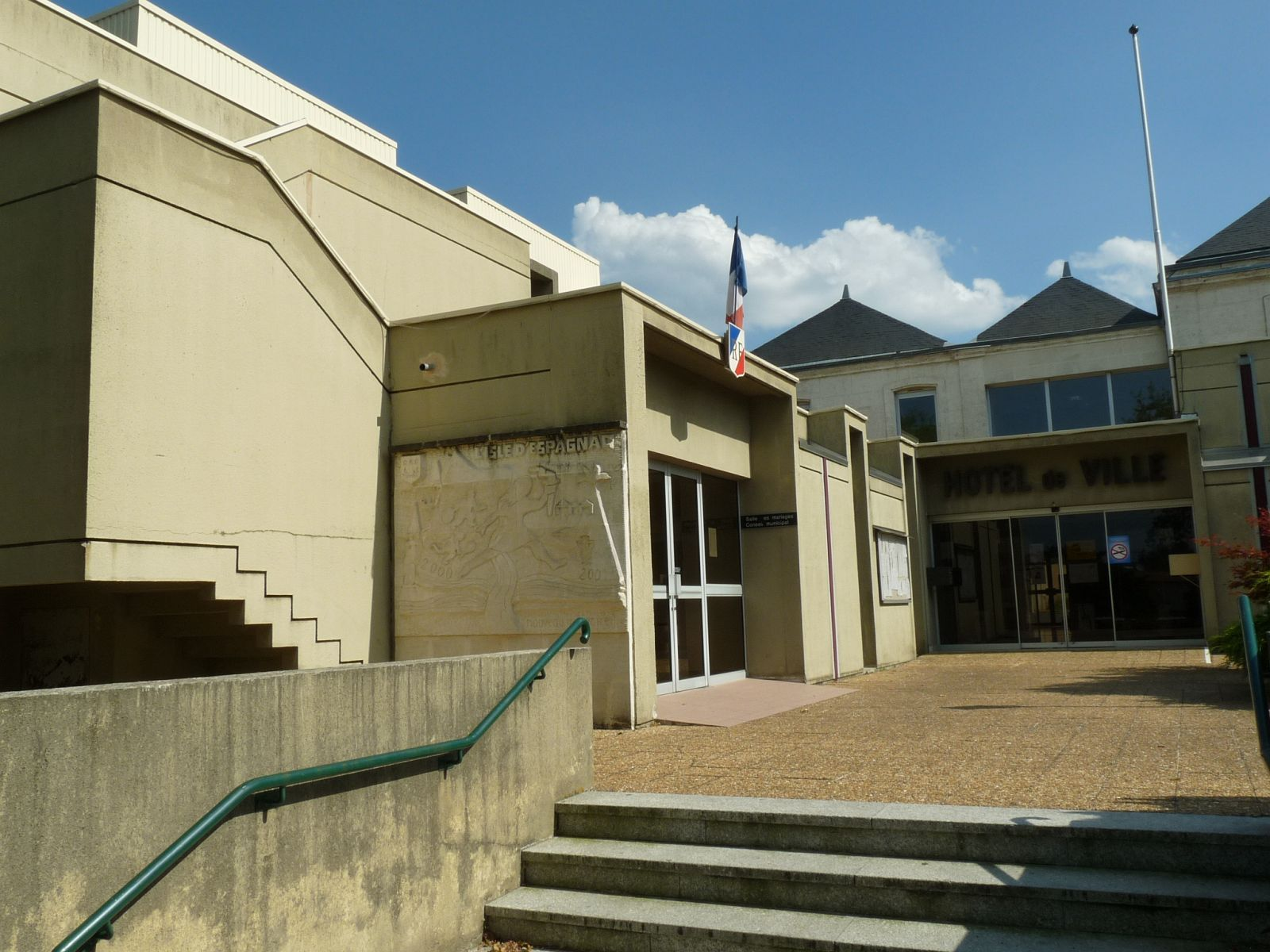
- Town hall

- Coat of arms
- Location of L'Isle-d'Espagnac
- Location within France Location within Nouvelle-Aquitaine
- Coordinates: 45°39′44″N 0°12′02″E
- Country: France
- Region: Nouvelle-Aquitaine
- Department: Charente
- Arrondissement: Angoulême
- Canton: Angoulême-2
- Intercommunality: Grand Angoulême

Government
  - Mayor (2020–2026): Michel Issard
- Area^{1}: 5.95 km^{2} (2.30 sq mi)
- Highest elevation: 120 m (390 ft)
- Lowest elevation: 38 m (125 ft)
- Population (2023): 5,682
  - Density: 955/km^{2} (2,470/sq mi)
- Time zone: UTC+01:00 (CET)
  - Summer (DST): UTC+02:00 (CEST)
- INSEE/Postal code: 16166 /16340
- ^{1} French Land Register data, which excludes lakes, ponds, glaciers > 1 km^{2} (0.386 sq mi or 247 acres) and river estuaries.

L'Isle-d'Espagnac (French pronunciation: [lil depaɲak]) is a commune in the Charente department in southwestern France.

== Population ==
Historical population

Year	Pop.	±% p.a.
1793	498	—
1800	446	−1.56%
1806	435	−0.42%
1821	471	+0.53%
1831	530	+1.19%
1841	502	−0.54%
1846	596	+3.49%
1851	641	+1.47%
1856	595	−1.48%
1861	628	+1.09%
1866	631	+0.10%
1872	635	+0.11%
1876	695	+2.28%
1881	795	+2.73%
1886	803	+0.20%
1891	830	+0.66%
1896	999	+3.78%
1901	1,159	+3.02%

Year	Pop.	±% p.a.
1906	1,178	+0.33%
1911	1,135	−0.74%
1921	1,108	−0.24%
1926	1,132	+0.43%
1931	1,248	+1.97%
1936	1,460	+3.19%
1946	2,081	+3.61%
1954	2,207	+0.74%
1962	3,655	+6.51%
1968	3,814	+0.71%
1975	4,960	+3.82%
1982	5,008	+0.14%
1990	4,795	−0.54%
1999	4,921	+0.29%
2007	5,325	+0.99%
2012	5,267	−0.22%
2017	5,604	+1.25%
2023	5,682	+0.23%

Source: EHESS and INSEE (1968-2023)

== See also ==
- Communes of the Charente department
