= Sandra Marsaud =

French politician

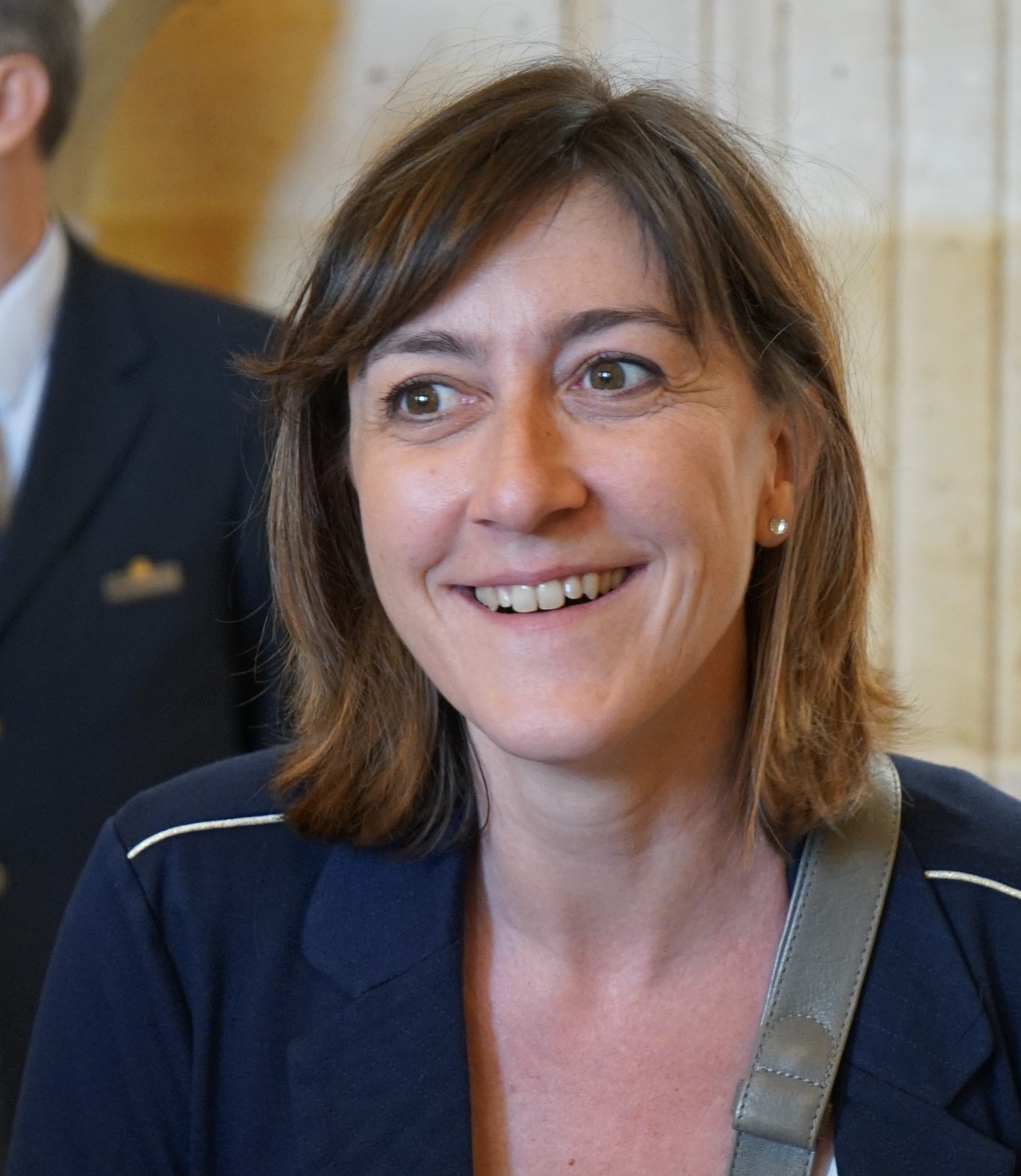
Sandra Marsaud in the National Assembly in June 2017.

Sandra Marsaud (born 2 January 1974 in Périgueux) is a politician representing La République En Marche!, France. She was elected to the French National Assembly on 18 June 2017, representing the 2nd constituency of the department of Charente.

== Biography ==
Sandra Marsaud graduated from Michel de Bordeaux Montaigne University with a degree in geography and regional planning (2001) and operational urban planning (2003).

Prior to her tenure, she was the head of an urban planning and local development consulting firm for 10 years. She has been involved in numerous development projects for local authorities in southwestern France. Sandra Marsaud was elected Deputy (France) for the second constituency of Charente in the 2017 legislative elections under the banner of Renaissance (French political party) en Marche with 58.73% of the vote against Daniel Sauvaitre (LR-UDI).

== See also ==
- 2017 French legislative election
