= Charente's 2nd constituency =

Constituency of the National Assembly of France

2nd constituency of Charente
- inline Constituency of the National Assembly of France

- The three constituencies of Charente

- Charente in France
- Deputy: Sandra Marsaud; RE
- Department: Charente
- Cantons: Baignes-Sainte-Radegonde, Barbezieux-Saint-Hilaire, Brossac, Châteauneuf-sur-Charente, Cognac-Nord, Cognac-Sud, Jarnac, Segonzac
- Registered voters: 84,111

The 2nd constituency of Charente is a French legislative constituency in the Charente département.

== Deputies ==
Election	Member	Party
1958	Félix Gaillard	DVG
1962	Félix Gaillard	DVG
1967	Félix Gaillard	FGDS
1968	Félix Gaillard	FGDS
1970	Jean Lafon	FGDS
1973	Francis Hardy	UDR
1978	Francis Hardy	RPR
1981	Bernard Villette	PS
1986	Proportional representation - no election by constituency	
1988	Pierre-Rémy Houssin	RPR
1993	Pierre-Rémy Houssin	RPR
1997	Marie-Line Reynaud	PS
2002	Jacques Bobe	UMP
2007	Marie-Line Reynaud	PS
2012	Marie-Line Reynaud	PS
2017	Sandra Marsaud	LREM
2022	Sandra Marsaud	RE
2024	Sandra Marsaud	RE

== Election results ==
=== 2024 ===
Candidate	Party	Alliance	First round			Second round		
Candidate	Party	Alliance	Votes	%	+/–	Votes	%	+/–
Barthélemy Martin	LR-RN	UXD	21,440	38.91	new	25,653	47.50	
Sandra Marsaud	RE	ENS	15,091	27.39	-1.38	28,350	52.50	-2.66
Carole Ballu	LFI	NFP	11,208	20.34	-0.16	withdrew		
Didier Jobit	LR	UDC	4,829	8.76	-3.48			
Françoise Bessas	LO		832	1.51	+0.34			
Alain Gérard Janot	REC		737	1.34	-2.44			
Aurore de Clisson	EXD		509	0.92	new			
Corentin Vinsonneau	Volt		457	0.83	new			
Votes			55,105	100.00		54,003	100.00	
Valid votes			55,105	96.34	-0.99	54,003	94.12	+3.56
Blank votes			1,304	2.28	+0.41	2,353	4.10	-2.46
Null votes			790	1.38	+0.58	1,020	1.78	-1.10
Turnout			57,199	68.62	+22.26	57,376	68.85	+21.11
Abstentions			26,161	31.38	-22.26	25,954	31.15	-21.11
Registered voters			83,360			83,330		
Result			RE HOLD					

=== 2022 ===
Legislative Election 2022: Charente's 2nd constituency
Party	Candidate	Votes	%	±%
LREM (Ensemble)	Sandra Marsaud	11,568	27.72	-8.37
RN	Marceau Rappasse	9,245	22.15	+7.90
LFI (NUPÉS)	Chloé Chevalier	8,244	19.76	−6.72
LR (UDC)	Jean-Hubert Lelievre	4,920	11.79	−4.42
PRG	Jérôme Desbrosse	1,915	4.59	N/A
REC	Daphné Goriaux	1,521	3.64	N/A
DVE	Carole Bataille	1,077	2.58	N/A
Others	N/A	1,719	4.12	
Turnout		40,209	49.36	−0.52
2nd round result
LREM (Ensemble)	Sandra Marsaud	19,965	55.16	-3.57
RN	Marceau Rappasse	16,228	44.84	N/A
Turnout		36,193	47.74	+4.70
LREM hold				

=== 2017 ===
Candidate	Label	First round		Second round	
Candidate	Label	Votes	%	Votes	%
Sandra Marsaud	REM	14,773	36.09	18,518	58.73
Daniel Sauvaitre	LR	6,637	16.21	13,011	41.27
Isabelle Lassalle	FN	5,833	14.25		
Nathalie Jabli	FI	4,840	11.82		
Marianne Reynaud-Jeandidier	PS	4,048	9.89		
Didier Tauzin	DIV	1,499	3.66		
Pascale Lacourarie	ECO	1,404	3.43		
Pascaline Brisset	UDI	694	1.70		
Claudine Poncy	PCF	549	1.34		
Alain Marquet	EXG	395	0.97		
Virginie Anguenot	DIV	231	0.56		
Catherine Tournerie	DVG	29	0.07		
Votes		40,932	100.00	31,529	100.00
Valid votes		40,932	97.74	31,529	87.26
Blank votes		587	1.40	2,960	8.19
Null votes		360	0.86	1,643	4.55
Turnout		41,879	49.88	36,132	43.04
Abstentions		42,087	50.12	47,814	56.96
Registered voters		83,966		83,946	
Source: Ministry of the Interior

=== 2012 ===
Summary of the 10 June and 17 June 2012 French legislative election in Charante’s 2nd Constituency
Candidate	Party		1st round		2nd round	
Candidate	Party		Votes	%	Votes	%
Marie-Line Reynaud	Socialist Party	PS	20,442	42.58%	26,733	57.08%
Daniel Sauvaitre	Union for a Popular Movement	UMP	13,119	27.32%	20,099	42.92%
Christophe Gillet	Front National	FN	5,405	11.26%		
Jérôme Sourisseau		CEN	3,331	6.94%		
Sylvie Mamet	Left Front	FG	2,354	4.90%		
Françoise Garandeau	Europe Ecology – The Greens	EELV	1,472	3.07%		
Brigitte Miet	Miscellaneous Right	DVD	728	1.52%		
Martine L'Huillier	Miscellaneous Right	DVD	309	0.64%		
Elisabeth Tomasini	Miscellaneous Right	DVD	285	0.59%		
Marion Maltor	Other	AUT	253	0.53%		
Gwenaëlle Gamine	Far Left	EXG	231	0.48%		
Jocelyne Hanrio	Radical Party	PRV	85	0.15%		
Total			48,014	100%	46,832	100%
Registered voters			84,854		84,796	
Blank/Void ballots			901	1.84%	1,475	3.05%
Turnout			48,915	57.65%	48,307	56.97%
Abstentions			35,939	42.35%	36,489	43.03%
Result					PS HOLD	

=== 2007 ===
Summary of the 10 June and 17 June 2007 French legislative election in Charante’s 2nd Constituency
Candidate	Party		1st round		2nd round	
Candidate	Party		Votes	%	Votes	%
Marie-Line Reynaud	Socialist Party	PS	10,515	28.37%	19,858	52.78%
Jérôme Mouhot	Union for a Popular Movement	UMP	9,925	26.78%	17,767	47.22%
Bertrand Sourisseau	Miscellaneous Right	DVD	6,612	17.84%		
Noël Belliot	Democratic Movement	MoDem	2,043	5.51%		
Jean-Claude Fayemendie	Miscellaneous Left	DVG	1,836	4.95%		
Michel Adam	The Greens	VEC	1,015	2.74%		
Simone Fayaud	Communist	PCF	984	2.66%		
Jean-Baptiste Millon	Front National	FN	967	2.61%		
Philippe Malsacré	Hunting, Fishing, Nature, Traditions	CPNT	891	2.40%		
Nathlaie Nouts	Far Left	EXG	788	2.13%		
Patrick Bompoint	Radical Party of the Left	PRG	629	1.70%		
Danièlle Dessouchet	Far Left	EXG	378	1.02%		
Patrick Fito	Movement for France	MPF	346	0.93%		
Jean-Pierre Tournier	Far Right	EXD	133	0.36%		
Total			37,062	100%	37,625	100%
Registered voters			62,486		62,482	
Blank/Void ballots			725	1.92%	1,195	3.08%
Turnout			37,787	60.47%	38,820	62.13%
Abstentions			24,699	39.53%	23,662	37.87%
Result					PS gain from UMP	

=== 2002 ===
Legislative Election 2002: Charente's 2nd constituency
Party	Candidate	Votes	%	±%
PS	Marie-Line Reynaud	12,689	32.78	
UMP	Jacques Bobe	8,753	22.61	
DVD	Jérôme Mouhot	8,199	21.18	
FN	Xavier Jean Dupuis	3,027	7.82	
CPNT	Guillaume Boisumeau	1,941	5.01	
LV	Sophie Adam-Bouvyer	971	2.51	
PCF	Simone Fayaud	958	2.47	
Others	N/A	2,177		
Turnout		39,497	64.95	
2nd round result
UMP	Jacques Bobe	18,579	50.53	
PS	Marie-Line Reynaud	18,187	49.47	
Turnout		38,045	62.58	
UMP gain from PS				

=== 1997 ===
Legislative Election 1997: Charente's 2nd constituency
Party	Candidate	Votes	%	±%
RPR	Pierre-Rémy Houssin	12,830	33.47	
PS	Marie-Line Reynaud	12,149	31.69	
FN	Jean Dupuis	4,282	11.17	
PCF	Simone Fayaud	3,337	8.70	
MPF	Bruno Asseray	2,254	5.88	
LV	Pascal Béllanger	1,521	3.97	
MEI	Daniel Mercier	882	2.30	
MRC	Guy Lafont	816	2.13	
DIV	Rose Desport	264	0.69	
Turnout		40,787	67.55	
2nd round result
PS	Marie-Line Reynaud	22,813	54.81	
RPR	Pierre-Rémy Houssin	18,808	45.19	
Turnout		43,857	72.64	
PS gain from RPR				
