= Soyaux =

- Commune
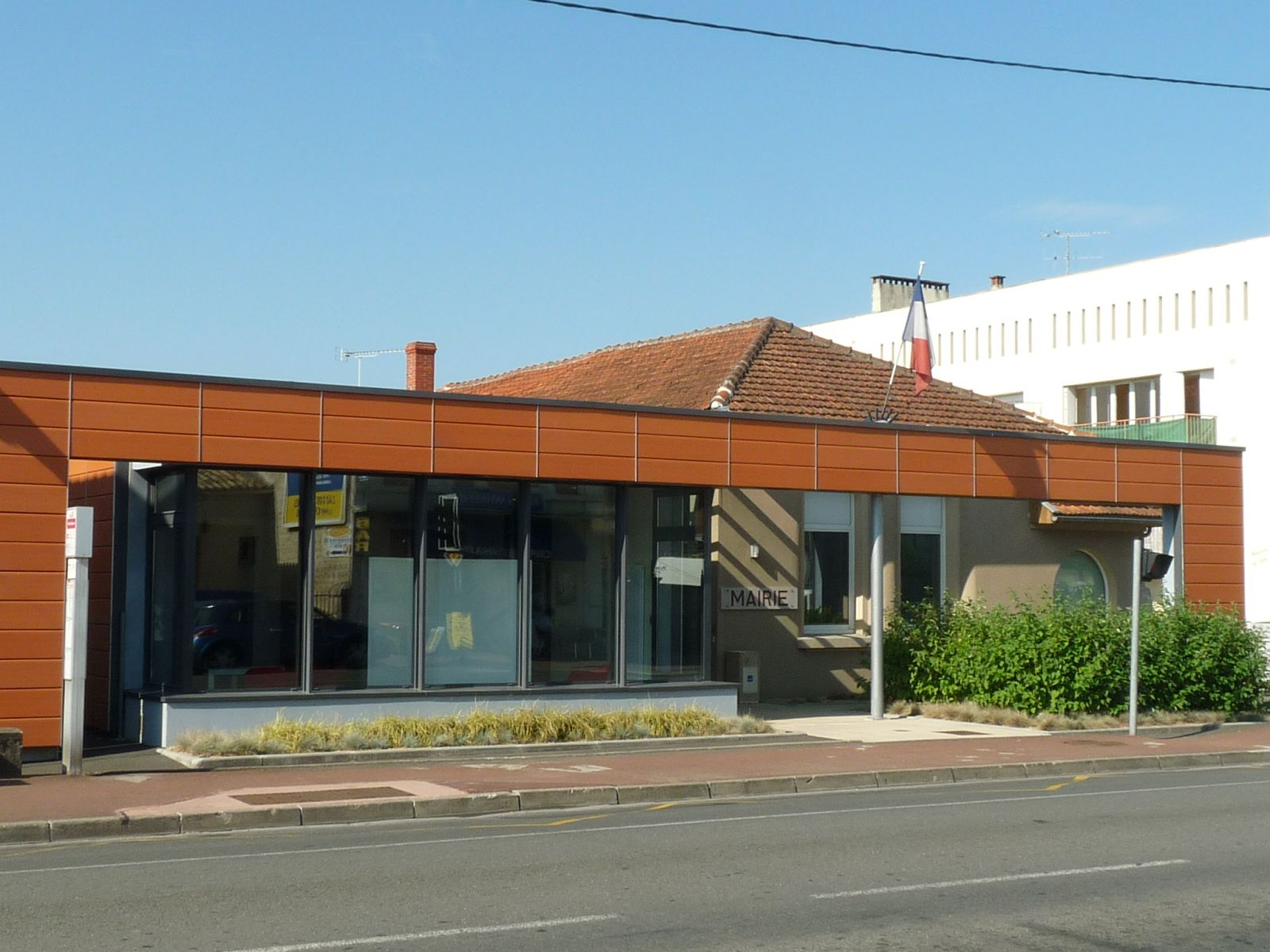
- Town hall
- Location of Soyaux
- Location within France Location within Nouvelle-Aquitaine
- Coordinates: 45°38′29″N 0°11′55″E
- Country: France
- Region: Nouvelle-Aquitaine
- Department: Charente
- Arrondissement: Angoulême
- Canton: Angoulême-3
- Intercommunality: Grand Angoulême

Government
  - Mayor (2020–2026): François Nebout
- Area^{1}: 12.76 km^{2} (4.93 sq mi)
- Elevation: 161 m (528 ft)
- Highest elevation: 166 m (545 ft)
- Lowest elevation: 56 m (184 ft)
- Population (2023): 10,087
  - Density: 790.5/km^{2} (2,047/sq mi)
- Time zone: UTC+01:00 (CET)
  - Summer (DST): UTC+02:00 (CEST)
- INSEE/Postal code: 16374 /16800
- ^{1} French Land Register data, which excludes lakes, ponds, glaciers > 1 km^{2} (0.386 sq mi or 247 acres) and river estuaries.

Soyaux (French pronunciation: [swajo] or [sojo]) is a commune in the Charente department in the Nouvelle-Aquitaine region in southwestern France. Situated east of Angoulême, it is one of the suburbs of the Angoulême urban area.

== Toponymy ==
The name Soyaux derives from the Late Latin sotellum, derived from the Low Latin sotum, apparently meaning 'wood'.

== Geography ==
=== Location and Access ===
Soyaux is a commune located directly east of Angoulême, on the road to Périgueux. It is part of Greater Angoulême, and is the second most populated commune after Angoulême, and the third most populated commune in the department after Cognac.

It is crossed by the D939, the former National Route 139, from La Rochelle to Périgueux via Angoulême.

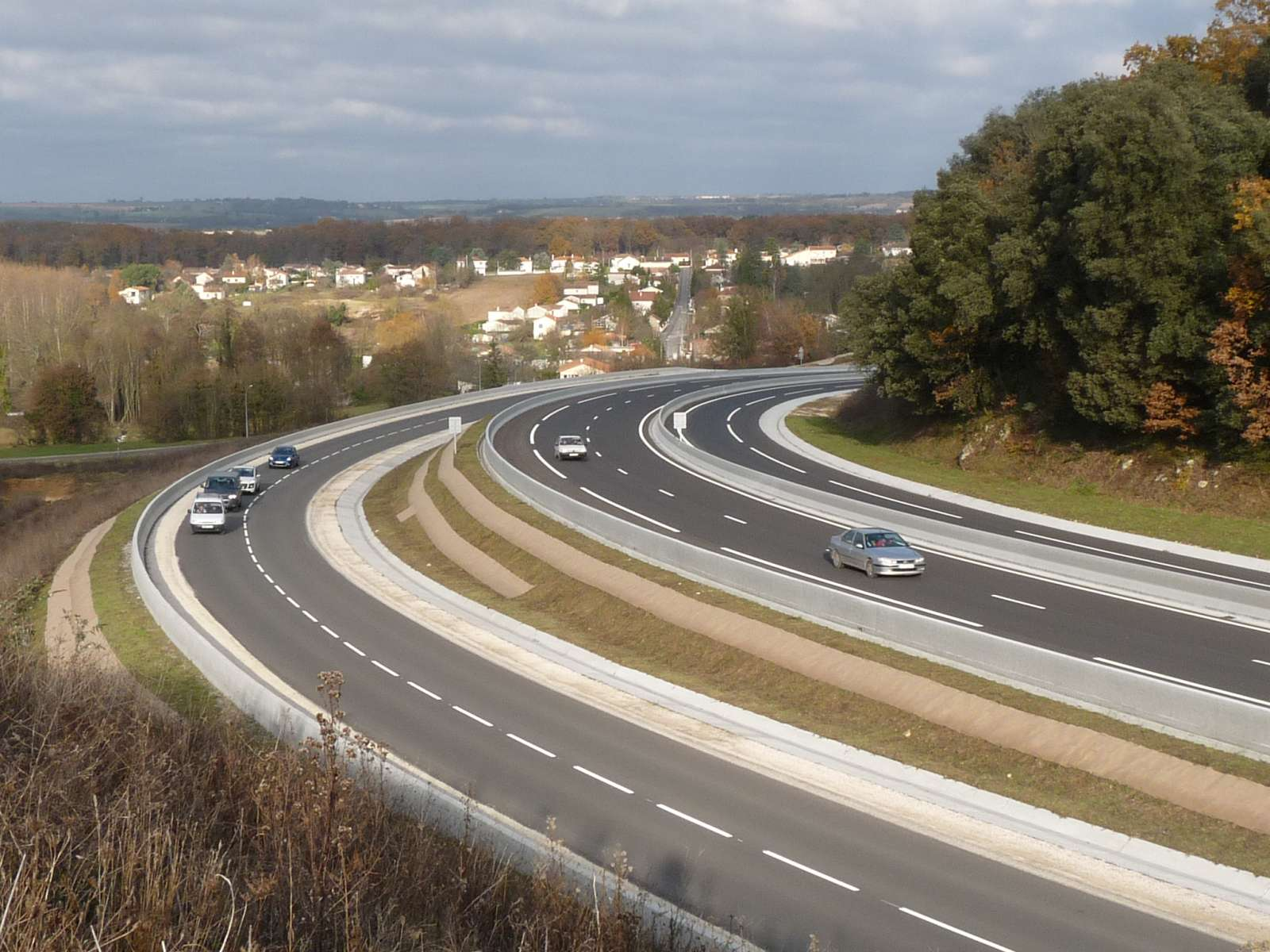
The ring road and the D121 descending towards L'Isle-d'Espagnac.

The town is bypassed to the east by the Angoulême eastern ring road (D1000), which, from 2006, runs south towards Puymoyen and Angoulême - Ma Campagne, and north towards L'Isle-d'Espagnac. The latter half was opened in 2010. The ring road intersects the Périgueux road at the Effamiers roundabout.

The D121 also crosses the commune, from the D939 to Isle-d'Espagnac and Gond-Pontouvre. It passes through Vieux Bourg and Les Rochers. It runs alongside the ring road, as the latter does not have an interchange serving this part of Isle-d'Espagnac.

=== Neighborhoods and hamlets ===
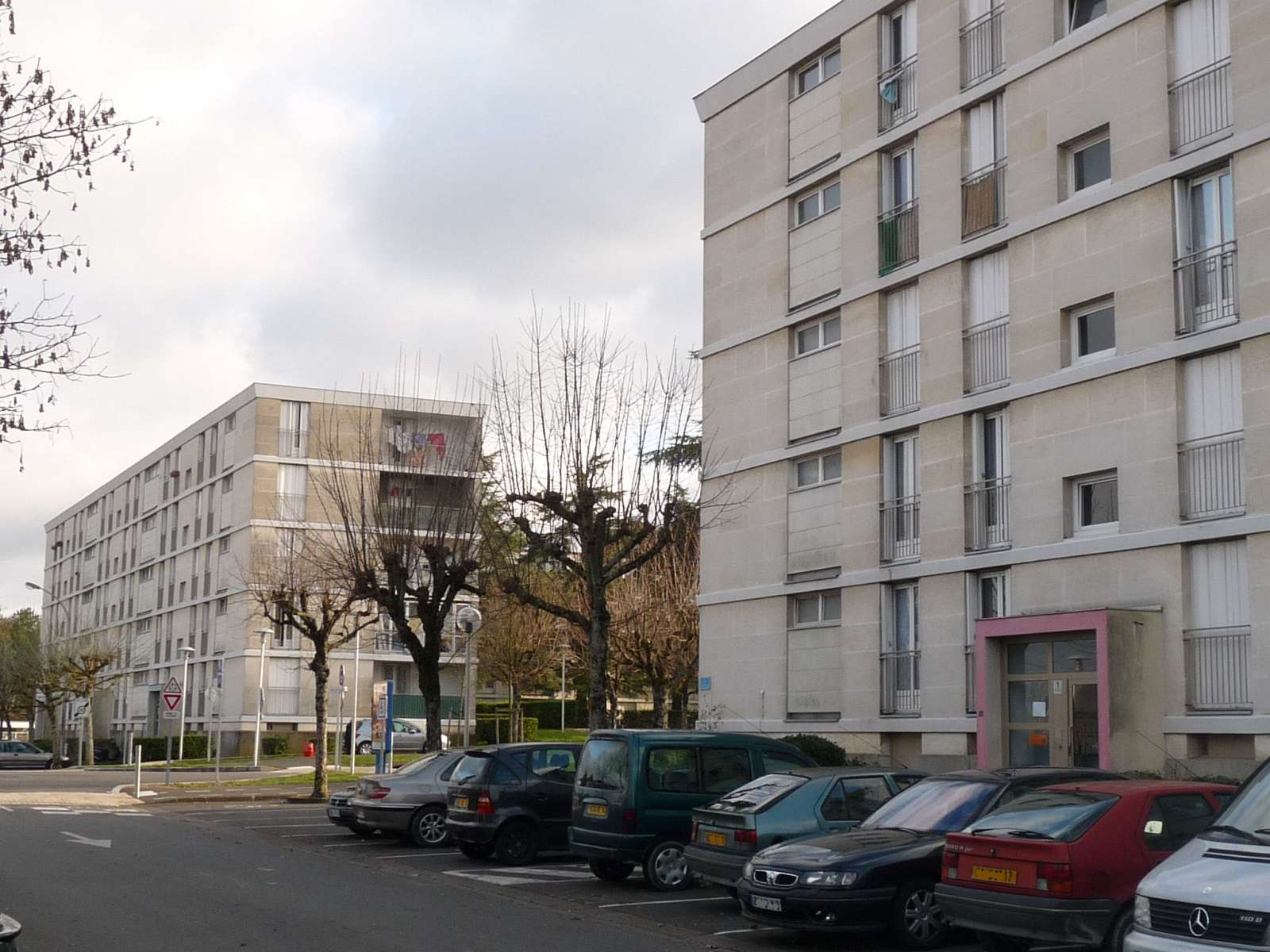
Le Champ de Manœuvre.

The largest neighborhood in Soyaux is "Le Champ de Manœuvre," a social housing estate built in the 1960s and 1970s. It includes buildings of no more than five stories, as well as three 14-story towers.

The old village of Soyaux, quite small, is located just north of the Périgueux road. The parish church is situated there.

The neighborhoods of Beaumont, near the Chanzy stadium, Grapillet, Terre Neuve, Tout-y-Faut, and La Cigogne are part of the urban area.

The other hamlets are: Recoux, les Rochers, Bois Menu, Antornac (also spelled Antournac, or Antournat at the beginning of the 20th century), Montboulard, la Croix Blanche, Frégeneuil, le Pétureau, le Peux, etc.

== Population ==
Historical population

Year	Pop.	±% p.a.
1793	486	—
1800	496	+0.29%
1806	517	+0.69%
1821	474	−0.58%
1831	568	+1.83%
1841	605	+0.63%
1846	676	+2.24%
1851	654	−0.66%
1856	615	−1.22%
1861	653	+1.21%
1866	700	+1.40%
1872	730	+0.70%
1876	793	+2.09%
1881	1,061	+6.00%
1886	1,311	+4.32%
1891	1,447	+1.99%
1896	1,515	+0.92%
1901	1,514	−0.01%

Year	Pop.	±% p.a.
1906	1,540	+0.34%
1911	1,630	+1.14%
1921	1,681	+0.31%
1926	1,836	+1.78%
1931	2,075	+2.48%
1936	2,282	+1.92%
1946	2,698	+1.69%
1954	2,959	+1.16%
1962	6,588	+10.52%
1968	11,680	+10.01%
1975	12,717	+1.22%
1982	10,903	−2.17%
1990	10,353	−0.64%
1999	10,177	−0.19%
2007	10,348	+0.21%
2012	9,570	−1.55%
2017	9,351	−0.46%
2023	10,087	+1.27%

Source: EHESS and INSEE (1968-2023)

== Notable people ==
- Bruno Périer (born 1966), former professional footballer

== Sights ==
- Sentier botanique de Soyaux

== See also ==
- Communes of the Charente department
- ASJ Soyaux

== Twin town ==
Soyaux is twinned with Monifieth, Angus, Scotland since 1994.
