= Nersac =

- Commune
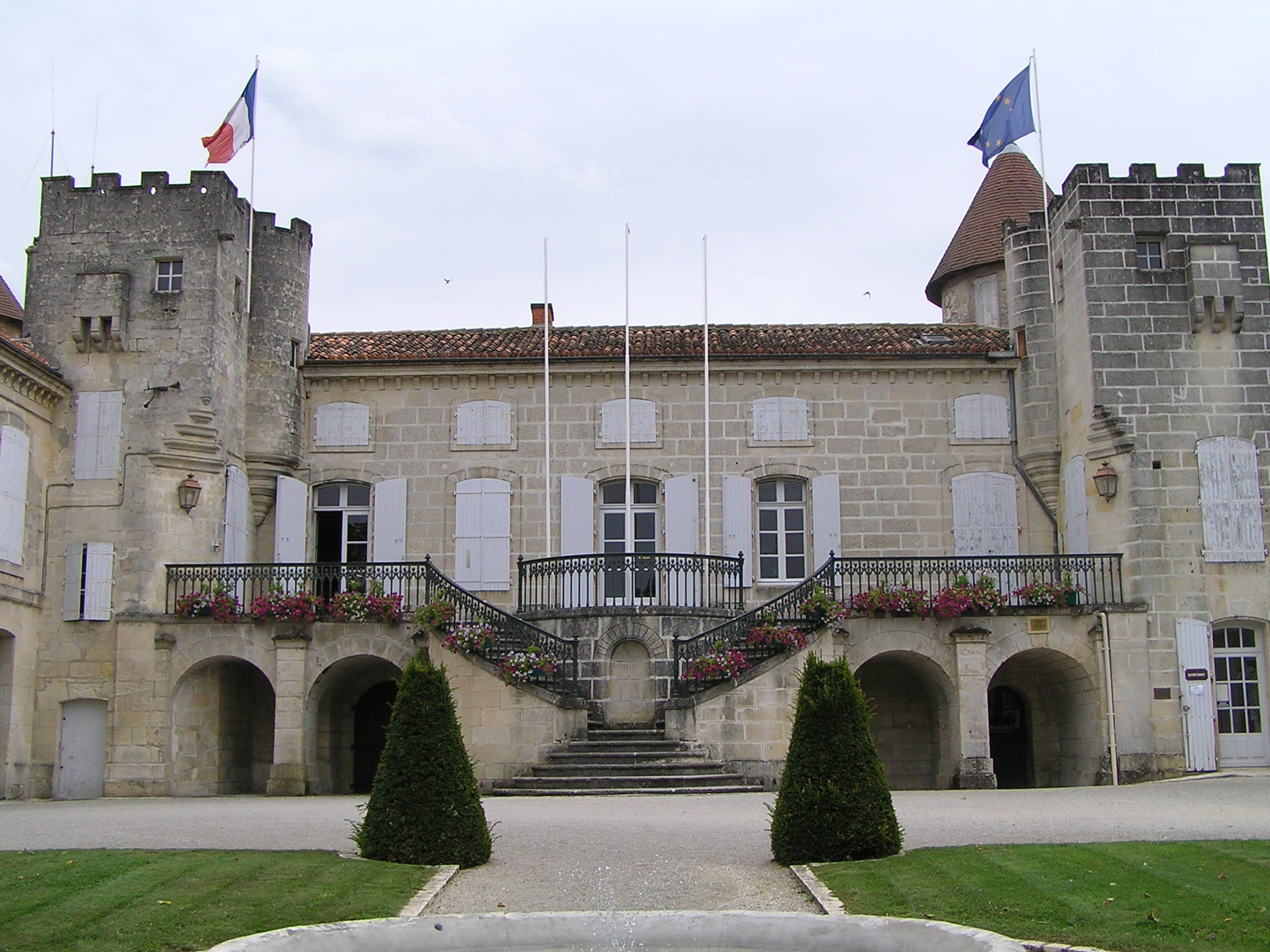
- Town hall

- Coat of arms
- Location of Nersac
- Location within France Location within Nouvelle-Aquitaine
- Coordinates: 45°37′37″N 0°03′06″E
- Country: France
- Region: Nouvelle-Aquitaine
- Department: Charente
- Arrondissement: Angoulême
- Canton: La Couronne
- Intercommunality: CA Grand Angoulême

Government
  - Mayor (2020–2026): Barbara Couturier
- Area^{1}: 9.24 km^{2} (3.57 sq mi)
- Elevation: 28 m (92 ft)
- Highest elevation: 74 m (243 ft)
- Lowest elevation: 21 m (69 ft)
- Population (2023): 2,246
  - Density: 243/km^{2} (630/sq mi)
- Time zone: UTC+01:00 (CET)
  - Summer (DST): UTC+02:00 (CEST)
- INSEE/Postal code: 16244 /16440
- ^{1} French Land Register data, which excludes lakes, ponds, glaciers > 1 km^{2} (0.386 sq mi or 247 acres) and river estuaries.

Nersac (French pronunciation: [nɛʁsak]) is a commune in the Charente department in southwestern France.

== Population ==
Historical population

Year	Pop.	±% p.a.
1793	693	—
1800	1,005	+5.45%
1806	983	−0.37%
1821	1,103	+0.77%
1831	1,033	−0.65%
1841	951	−0.82%
1846	1,244	+5.52%
1851	1,245	+0.02%
1856	1,247	+0.03%
1861	1,345	+1.52%
1866	1,339	−0.09%
1872	1,326	−0.16%
1876	1,410	+1.55%
1881	1,431	+0.30%
1886	1,575	+1.94%
1891	1,458	−1.53%
1896	1,432	−0.36%
1901	1,454	+0.31%

Year	Pop.	±% p.a.
1906	1,285	−2.44%
1911	1,234	−0.81%
1921	1,128	−0.89%
1926	1,233	+1.80%
1931	1,288	+0.88%
1936	1,285	−0.05%
1946	1,324	+0.30%
1954	1,658	+2.85%
1962	1,774	+0.85%
1968	1,817	+0.40%
1975	2,118	+2.21%
1982	2,110	−0.05%
1990	2,433	+1.80%
1999	2,384	−0.23%
2007	2,317	−0.36%
2012	2,481	+1.38%
2017	2,416	−0.53%
2023	2,246	−1.21%

Source: EHESS and INSEE (1968-2023)

== See also ==
- Communes of the Charente department
