= Arrondissements of the Charente department =

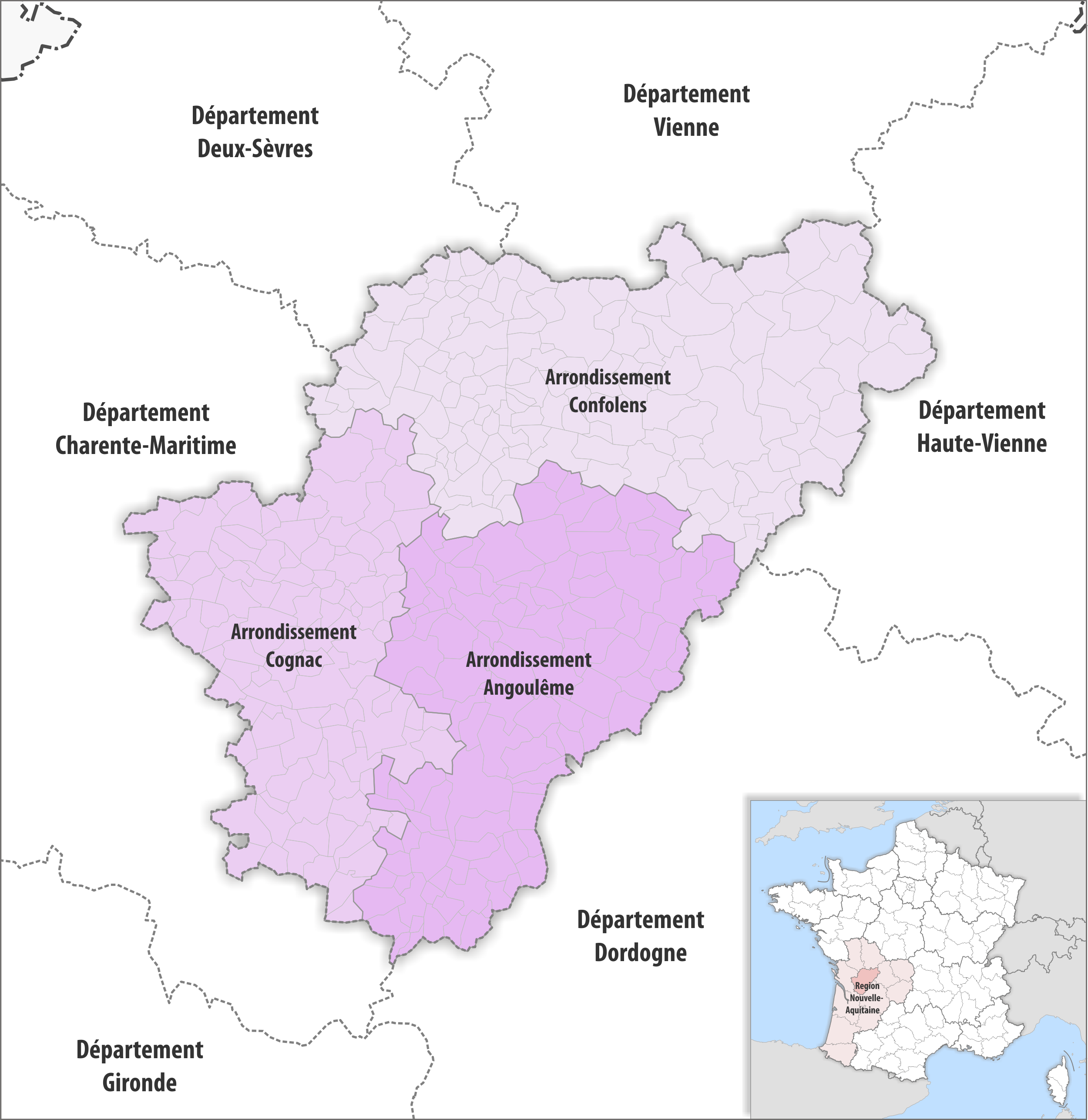
Map of arrondissements of the Charente department.

The 3 arrondissements of the Charente department are:

1. Arrondissement of Angoulême, (prefecture of the Charente department: Angoulême) with 115 communes. The population of the arrondissement was 181,315 in 2021.
2. Arrondissement of Cognac, (subprefecture: Cognac) with 107 communes. The population of the arrondissement was 98,683 in 2021.
3. Arrondissement of Confolens, (subprefecture: Confolens) with 140 communes. The population of the arrondissement was 70,869 in 2021.

== History ==
In 1800 the arrondissements of Angoulême, Barbezieux, Cognac, Confolens and Ruffec were established. The arrondissements of Barbezieux and Ruffec were disbanded in 1926. On 1 January 2008 the four cantons of Aigre, Mansle, Ruffec and Villefagnan that previously belonged to the arrondissement of Angoulême were added to the arrondissement of Confolens, and the canton of Rouillac to the arrondissement of Cognac.

The borders of the arrondissements of Charente were modified in January 2017:

- 14 communes from the arrondissement of Angoulême to the arrondissement of Cognac
- 15 communes from the arrondissement of Angoulême to the arrondissement of Confolens
- two communes from the arrondissement of Cognac to the arrondissement of Angoulême
