= Canton of Angoulême-1 =

Coordinates: 45.65°N 0.15°E

- Canton
- Situation of the canton of Angoulême-1 in the department of Charente
- Country: France
- Region: Nouvelle-Aquitaine
- Department: Charente
- No. of communes: {{{nbcomm}}}
- Population (2023): 18,504
- INSEE code: 1601

The canton of Angoulême-1 is an administrative division of the Charente department, southwestern France. It was created at the French canton reorganisation which came into effect in March 2015. Its seat is in Angoulême.

It consists of the following communes:

1. Angoulême (partly)
2. Fléac
