= Canton of La Couronne =

Coordinates: 45.61°N 0.10°E

- Canton
- Situation of the canton of La Couronne in the department of Charente
- Country: France
- Region: Nouvelle-Aquitaine
- Department: Charente
- No. of communes: {{{nbcomm}}}
- Population (2023): 15,610
- INSEE code: 1613

The canton of La Couronne is an administrative division of the Charente department, southwestern France. Its borders were modified at the French canton reorganisation which came into effect in March 2015. Its seat is in La Couronne.

It consists of the following communes:

1. La Couronne
2. Nersac
3. Puymoyen
4. Saint-Michel
