= Charente =

Department of France

Charente Chérente (Saintongeais) Charanta (Occitan)
- Department of France
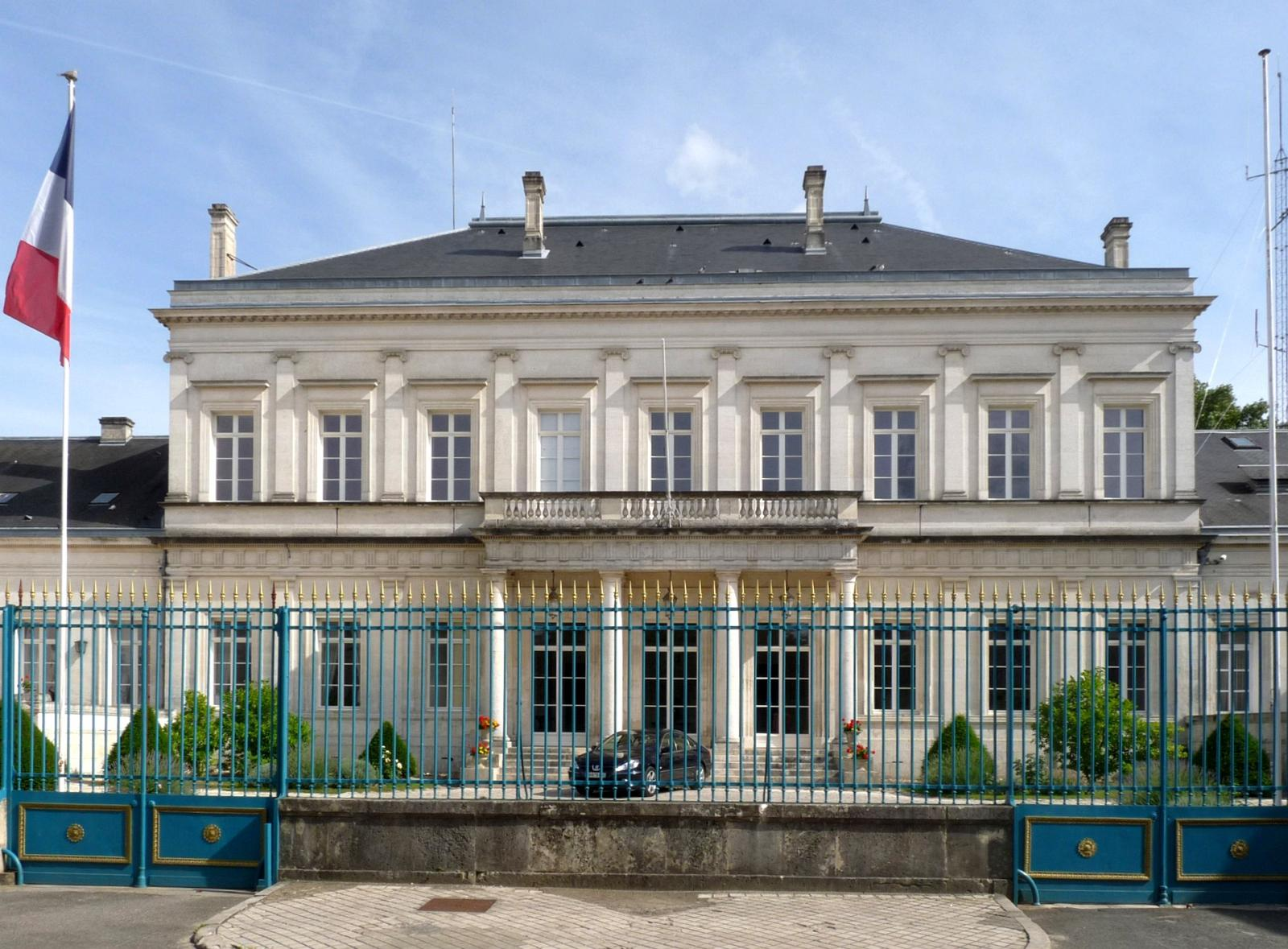
- Prefecture building of the Charente department, in Angoulême

- Flag Coat of arms

- Location of Charente in France
- Coordinates: 45°50′N 0°20′E
- Country: France
- Region: Nouvelle-Aquitaine
- Prefecture: Angoulême
- Subprefectures: Cognac; Confolens

Government
  - President of the Departmental Council: Philippe Bouty (DVG)

Area^{1}
  - Total: 5,956 km^{2} (2,300 sq mi)

Population (2023)
  - Total: 352,683
  - Rank: 68th
  - Density: 59/km^{2} (150/sq mi)
- Time zone: UTC+1 (CET)
  - Summer (DST): UTC+2 (CEST)
- Postal code: Angoulême has the postal code of 16000
- ISO 3166 code: FR-16
- Department number: 16
- Arrondissements: 3
- Cantons: 19
- Communes: 359
- ^1 French Land Register data, which exclude estuaries, and lakes, ponds, and glaciers larger than 1 km^{2}

Charente (French: [ʃaʁɑ̃t]; Saintongese: Chérente; Occitan: Charanta [tʃaˈɾantɔ]) is a department in the administrative region of Nouvelle-Aquitaine, southwestern France. It is named after the river Charente, the most important and longest river in the department, and also the river beside which the department's two largest towns, Angoulême and Cognac, are sited. In 2023, it had a population of 352,683.

== History ==
Charente is one of the original 83 departments created during the French Revolution on 4 March 1790. It was created from the former province of Angoumois, and western and southern portions of Saintonge.

Prior to the creation of the department as a single unit, much of it was commercially prosperous thanks to traditional industries such as salt and cognac production. Although the river Charente became silted up and was unnavigable for much of the twentieth century, in the eighteenth century it provided important links with coastal shipping routes both for traditional businesses and for newly evolving ones such as paper goods and iron smelting.

The accelerating pace of industrial and commercial development during the first half of the nineteenth century led to a period of prosperity, and the department's population peaked in 1851.

During the second half of the nineteenth century Charente, like many of France's rural departments, experienced a decline in population as the economic prospects available in the cities and in France's overseas empire attracted working-aged people. Economic ruin came to many in the Charentais wine industry with the arrival in 1872 of phylloxera.

During the twentieth century, the department with its traditional industries was adversely impacted by two major world wars, and in the second half of the century, it experienced relatively low growth. The overall population remaining remarkably stable at around 340,000 throughout the second half of the twentieth century, although industrial and commercial developments in the conurbation surrounding Angoulême have added some 10,000 to the overall population during the first decade of the 21st century.

The relatively relaxed pace of economic development in the twentieth century encouraged the immigration of retirees from overseas. Census data in 2006 revealed that the number of British citizens residing in the department had risen to 5,083, placing the department fourth in this respect behind Paris, Dordogne and Alpes-Maritimes.

== Geography ==
It is largely part of the Aquitaine Basin, with the northeastern part in the Massif Central. The Charente flows through it and gave its name to the department, along with Charente-Maritime. It is composed with the historical region of Angoumois and contains part of the regions of Saintonge, Limousin, Périgord and Poitou.

The department is part of the current region of Nouvelle-Aquitaine. It is surrounded by the departments of Charente-Maritime, Dordogne, Haute-Vienne, Vienne and Deux-Sèvres. The southernmost “major” town (town with over 1,000 people) in the Charente is Chalais.

=== Principal towns ===
The most populous commune is Angoulême, the prefecture. As of 2023, there are nine communes with more than 5,000 inhabitants:

| Commune | Population (2023) |
|---|---|
| Angoulême | 41,908 |
| Cognac | 18,532 |
| Soyaux | 10,087 |
| La Couronne | 7,765 |
| Saint-Yrieix-sur-Charente | 7,539 |
| Ruelle-sur-Touvre | 7,408 |
| Gond-Pontouvre | 5,862 |
| L'Isle-d'Espagnac | 5,682 |
| Champniers | 5,281 |

== Demographics ==
The inhabitants of the department are called Charentais or in feminine, Charentaise.

Population development since 1791:

Historical population

| Year | Pop. | ±% p.a. |
|---|---|---|
| 1791 | 339,780 | — |
| 1801 | 299,029 | −1.27% |
| 1806 | 327,052 | +1.81% |
| 1821 | 347,541 | +0.41% |
| 1831 | 362,531 | +0.42% |
| 1841 | 367,893 | +0.15% |
| 1851 | 382,912 | +0.40% |
| 1861 | 379,081 | −0.10% |
| 1872 | 367,520 | −0.28% |
| 1881 | 370,822 | +0.10% |
| 1891 | 360,259 | −0.29% |
| 1901 | 350,305 | −0.28% |
| 1911 | 347,061 | −0.09% |
| 1921 | 316,279 | −0.92% |

| Year | Pop. | ±% p.a. |
|---|---|---|
| 1931 | 310,489 | −0.18% |
| 1936 | 309,279 | −0.08% |
| 1946 | 311,137 | +0.06% |
| 1954 | 313,635 | +0.10% |
| 1962 | 327,658 | +0.55% |
| 1968 | 331,016 | +0.17% |
| 1975 | 337,064 | +0.26% |
| 1982 | 340,770 | +0.16% |
| 1990 | 341,993 | +0.04% |
| 1999 | 339,628 | −0.08% |
| 2007 | 349,535 | +0.36% |
| 2012 | 353,657 | +0.23% |
| 2017 | 352,335 | −0.07% |
| 2023 | 352,683 | +0.02% |

== Politics ==
The President of the Departmental Council is Philippe Bouty of the Miscellaneous left (DVG), elected in July 2021.

| Party | | seats |
|---|---|---|
| • | Socialist Party | 15 |
| | Union for a Popular Movement | 6 |
| | Miscellaneous Right | 6 |
| • | Miscellaneous Left | 6 |
| • | French Communist Party | 2 |

=== National Assembly representatives ===
| Constituency | Member | Party |
|---|---|---|
| Charente's 1st constituency | René Pilato | La France Insoumise |
| Charente's 2nd constituency | Sandra Marsaud | Renaissance |
| Charente's 3rd constituency | Caroline Colombier | National Rally |

== Economy ==
Cognac and pineau are two of the major agricultural products of the region, along with butter. The Charentaise slipper (a type of slipper made from felt and wool) is another well-known traditional product.

== Tourism ==
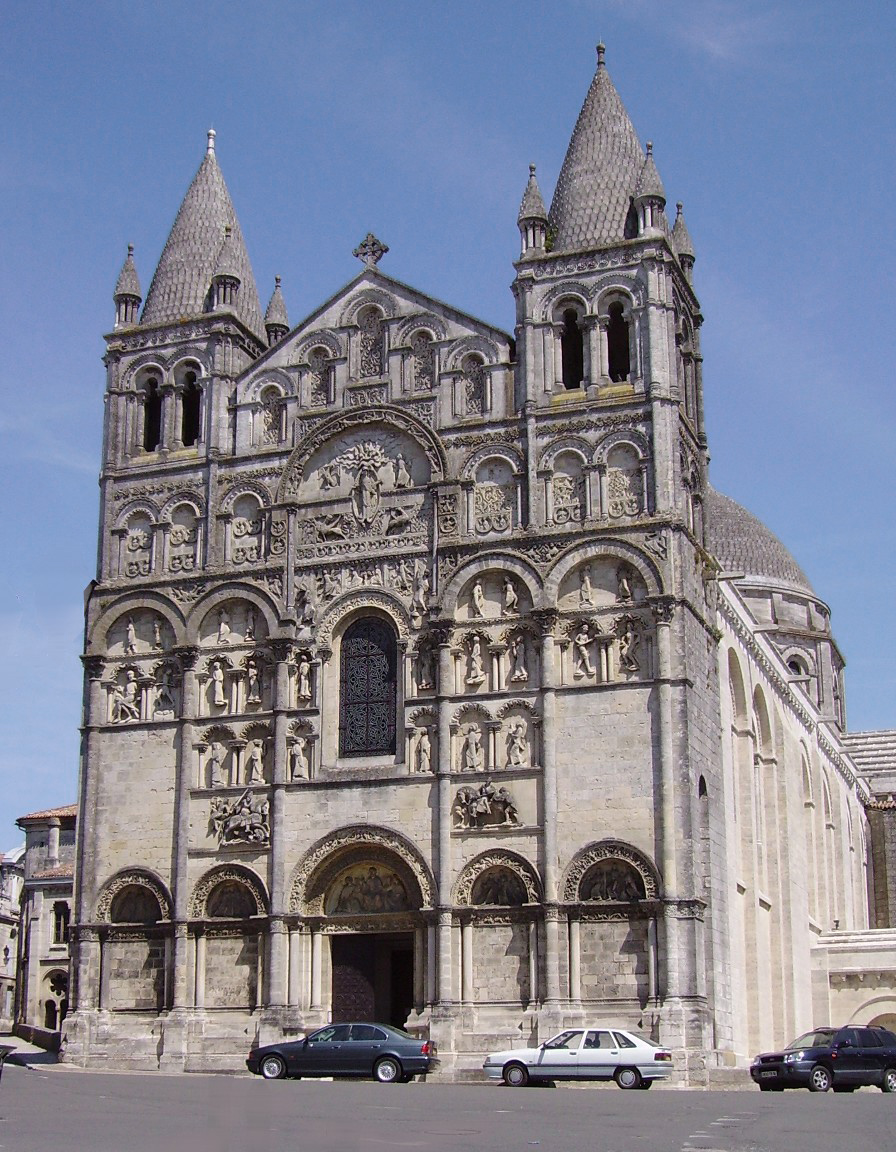
Angoulême Cathedral

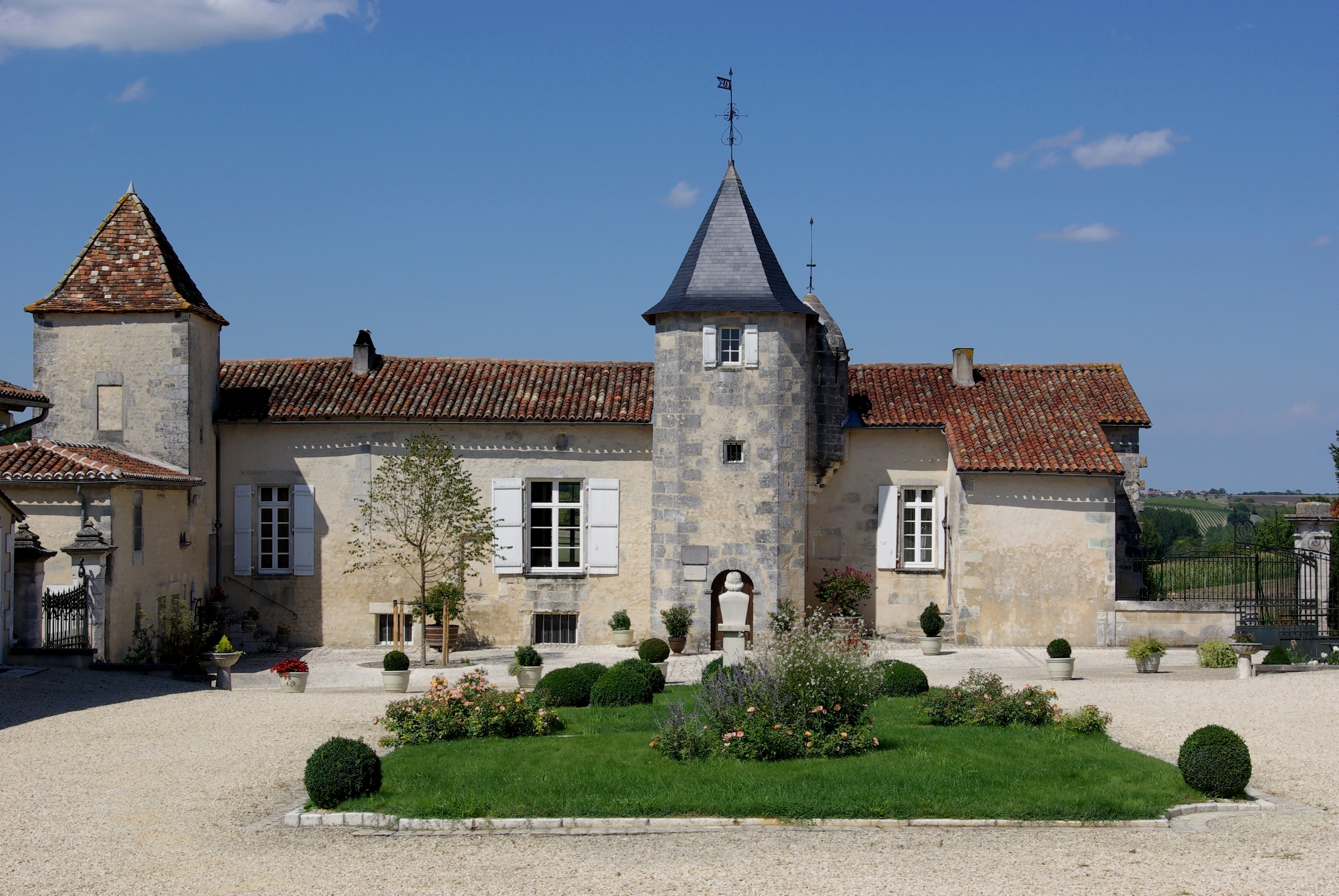
Champagne-Vigny

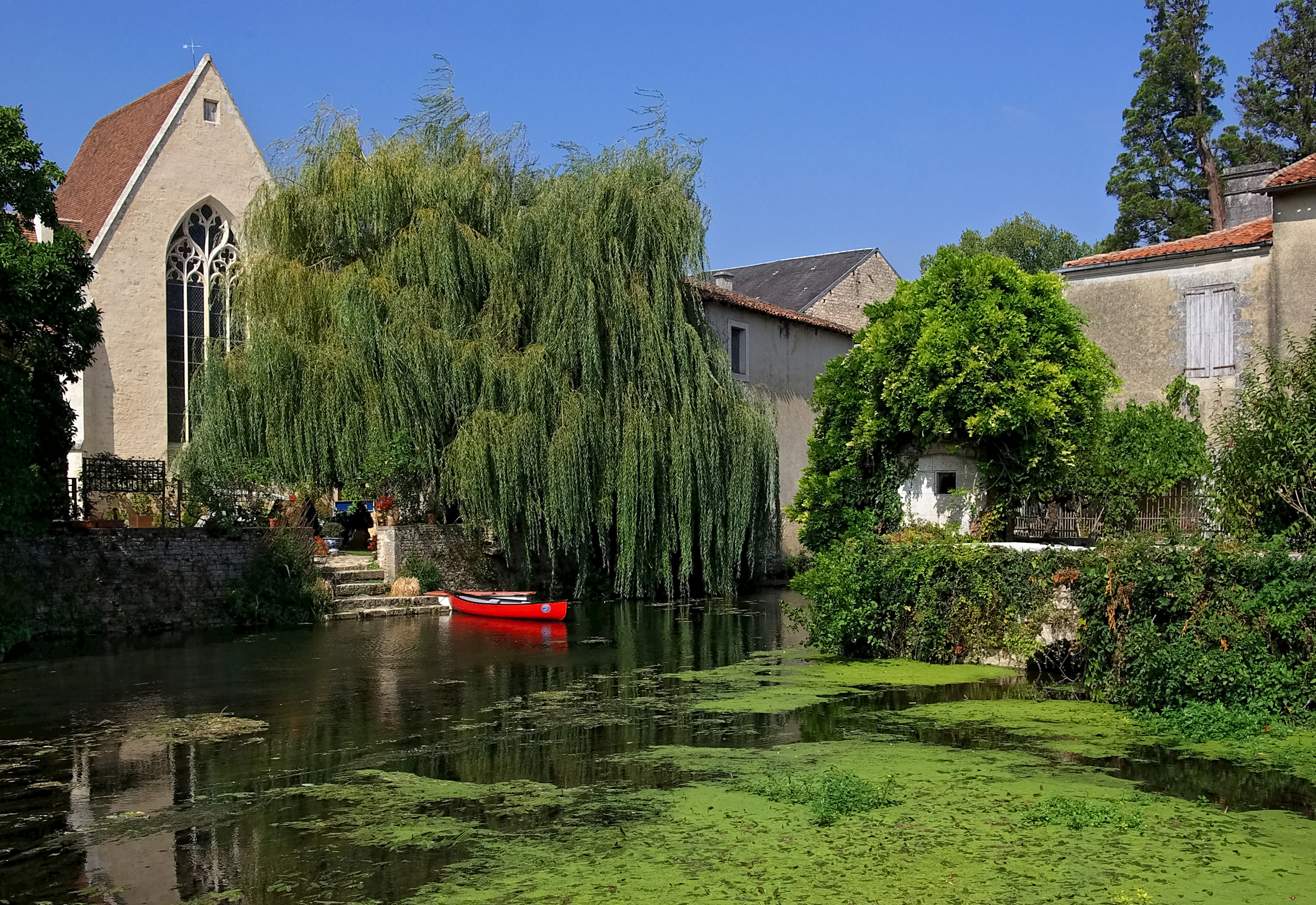
Verteuil-sur-Charente

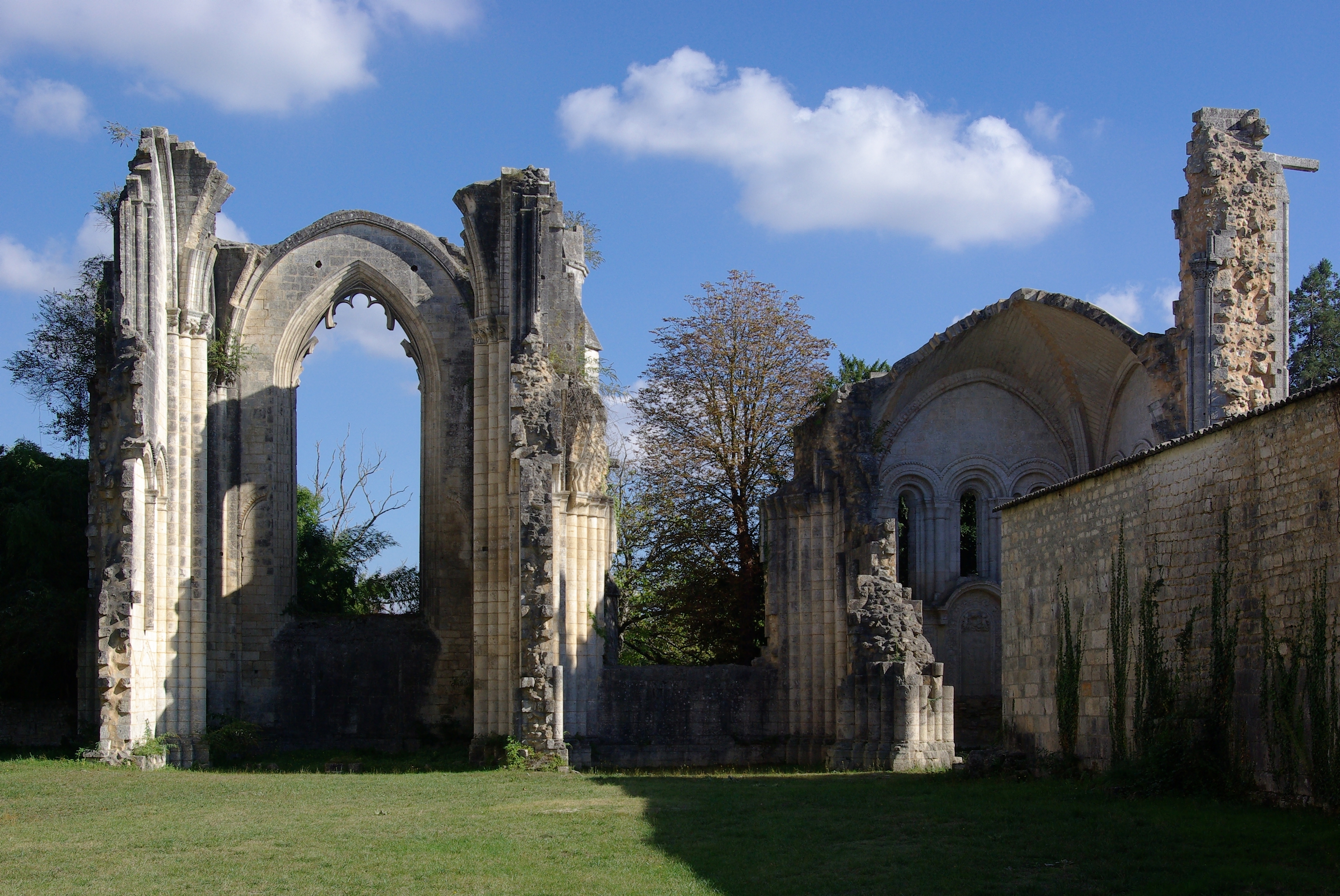
Abbey of La Couronne

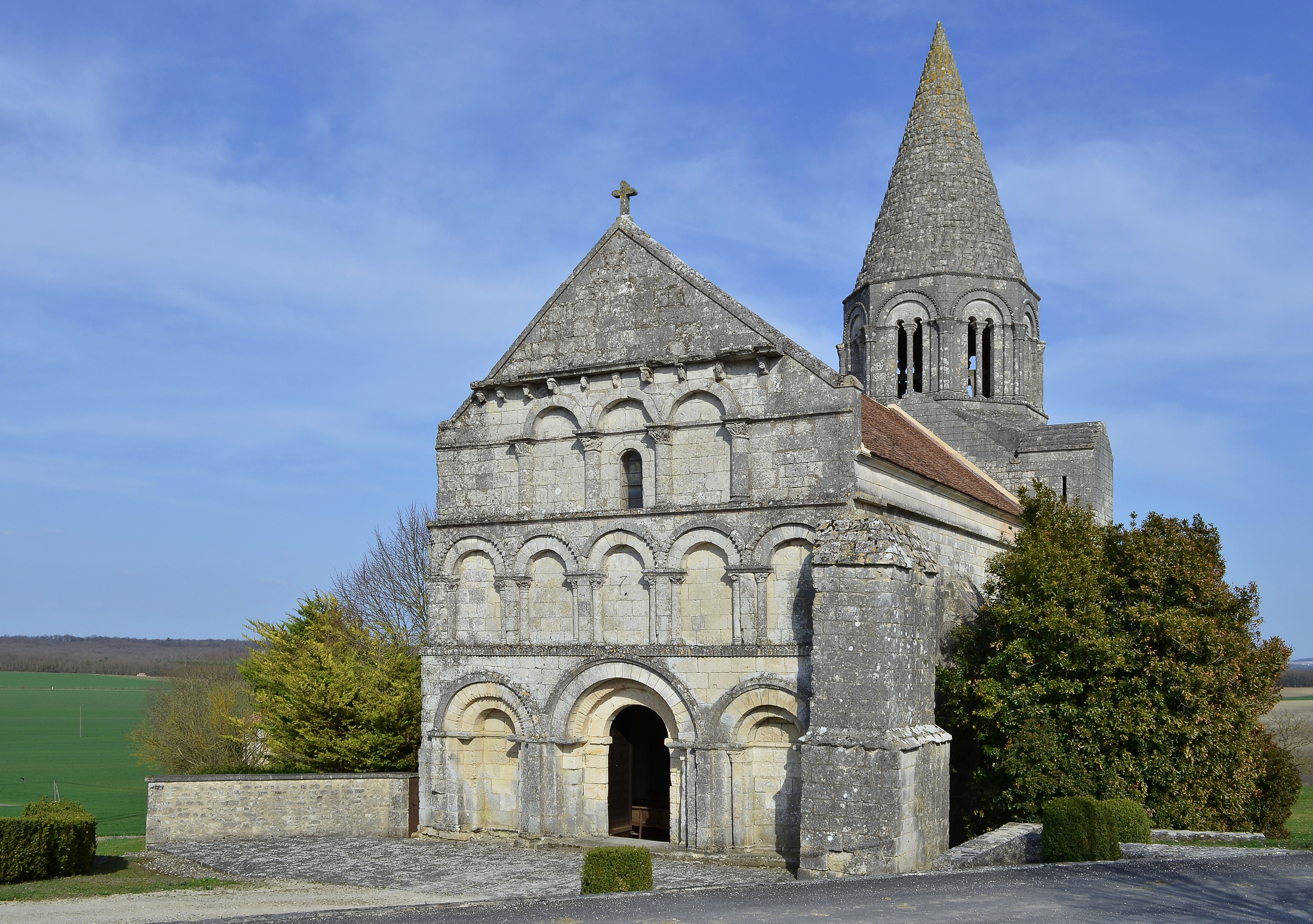
Plassac-Rouffiac

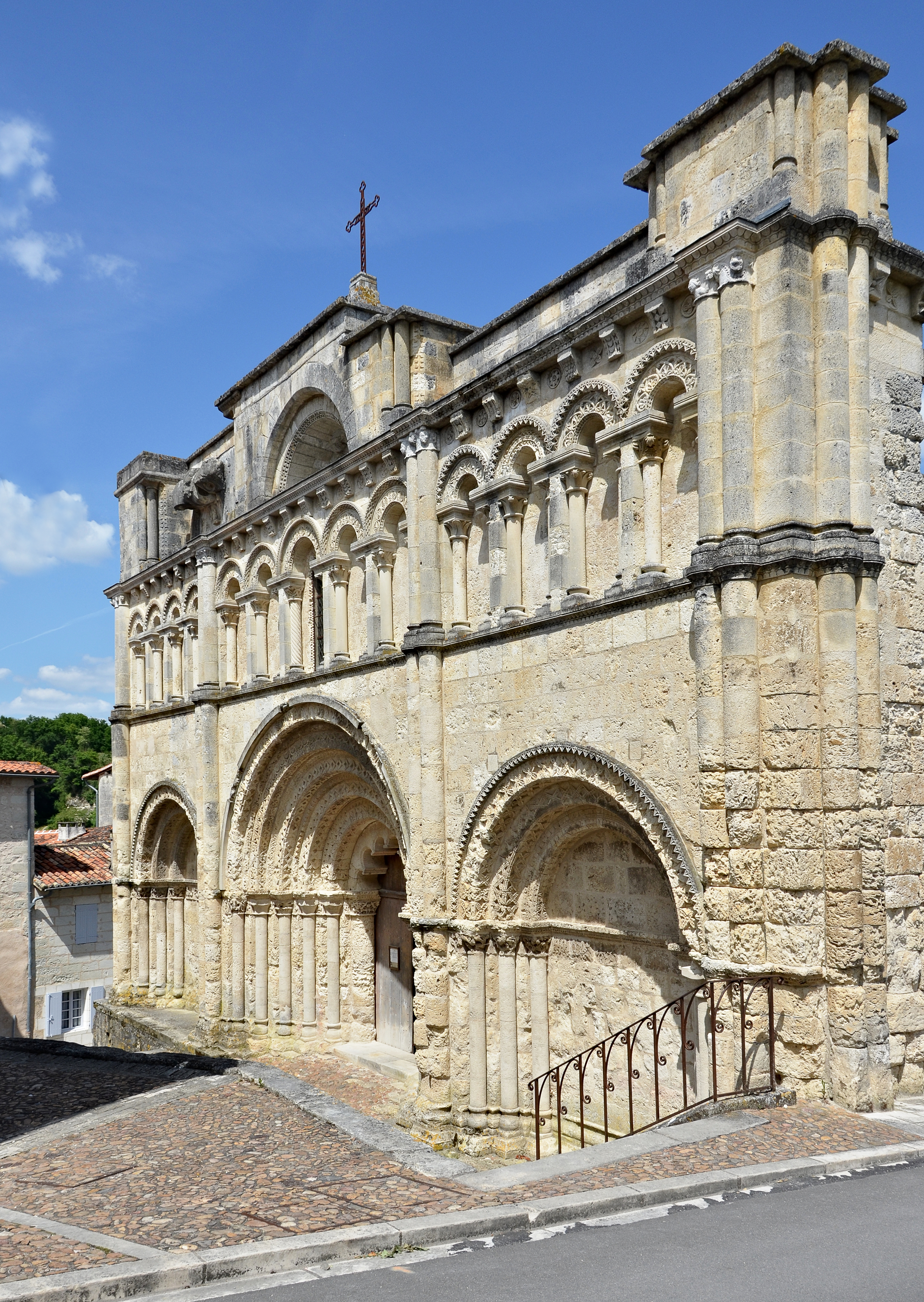
Aubeterre-sur-Dronne

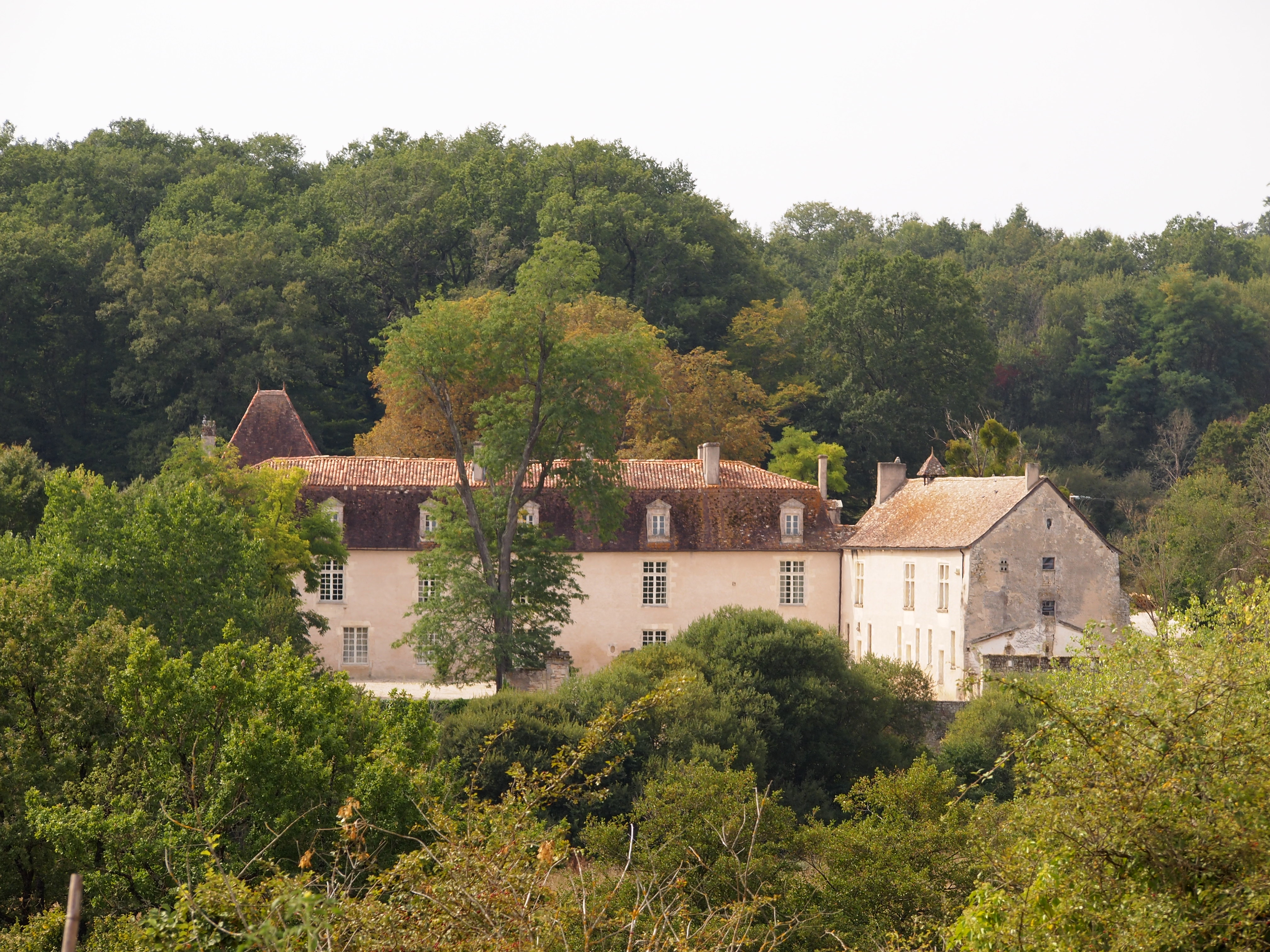
Château de la Faye

== See also ==
- Arrondissements of the Charente department
- Cantons of the Charente department
- Communes of the Charente department
- Kaolin deposits of the Charentes Basin
- Megalithic sites of Charente
