= Sers, Charente =

Sers
- Commune
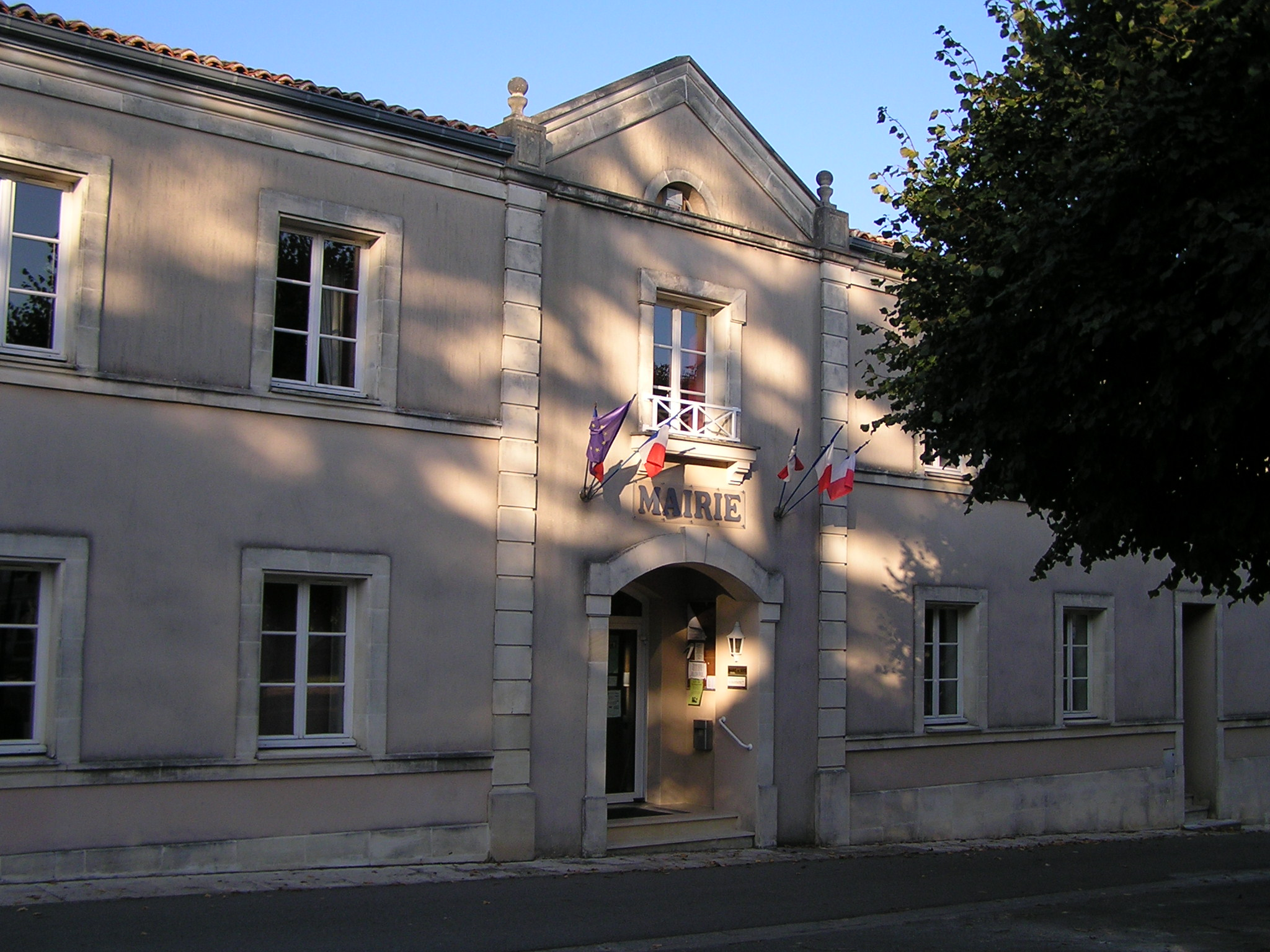
- Town hall
- Location of Sers
- Location within France Location within Nouvelle-Aquitaine
- Coordinates: 45°35′53″N 0°19′25″E
- Country: France
- Region: Nouvelle-Aquitaine
- Department: Charente
- Arrondissement: Angoulême
- Canton: Boëme-Échelle
- Intercommunality: Grand Angoulême

Government
  - Mayor (2020–2026): Roland Veaux
- Area^{1}: 14.17 km^{2} (5.47 sq mi)
- Elevation: 178 m (584 ft)
- Highest elevation: 220 m (720 ft)
- Lowest elevation: 82 m (269 ft)
- Population (2023): 896
  - Density: 63.2/km^{2} (164/sq mi)
- Time zone: UTC+01:00 (CET)
  - Summer (DST): UTC+02:00 (CEST)
- INSEE/Postal code: 16368 /16410
- ^{1} French Land Register data, which excludes lakes, ponds, glaciers > 1 km^{2} (0.386 sq mi or 247 acres) and river estuaries.

Sers (French pronunciation: [sɛʁ]; Occitan: Sar) is a commune in the Charente department in the Nouvelle-Aquitaine region in southwestern France.

Located to the southeast of Angoulême on a plateau above the river Échelle, Sers is on the edge of the forest of Horte to the south.

== Neighbouring communes ==
Neighbouring communes include Bouëx, Vouzan, Grassac, Rougnac, Dignac, Dirac and Garat.

The commune is part of the communauté d'agglomération Grand Angoulême.

== History ==
A rock with magnificent carvings from the Upper Palaeolithic period was discovered in 1927 at the place known as Roc de Sers, in the Échelle valley upstream from Sers. The carvings are in Solutrean style.

A blast furnace and cannon foundry, built in 1514, was in operation until 1762 at Planche Meunier, near Sers.

The dairy and cheese farm built in 1896 on the site of an old flour mill closed at the end of the 20th century.

The population of the commune has increased steadily since the low point of the 1950s.

== Population ==
Historical population
Year	Pop.	±% p.a.
1968	413	—
1975	472	+1.93%
1982	540	+1.94%
1990	633	+2.01%
1999	673	+0.68%
2007	728	+0.99%
2012	807	+2.08%
2017	871	+1.54%
2023	896	+0.47%
Source: INSEE

People from Sers are called sersois in French.

== Sights ==
The prehistoric carvings at Roc de Sers can be viewed by contacting the Mairie (Town Hall).

The parish church dedicated to St Peter dates from the 12th century. Its square Romanesque steeple has paired openings with semi-circular arches on the top two levels, and blind arcading below.

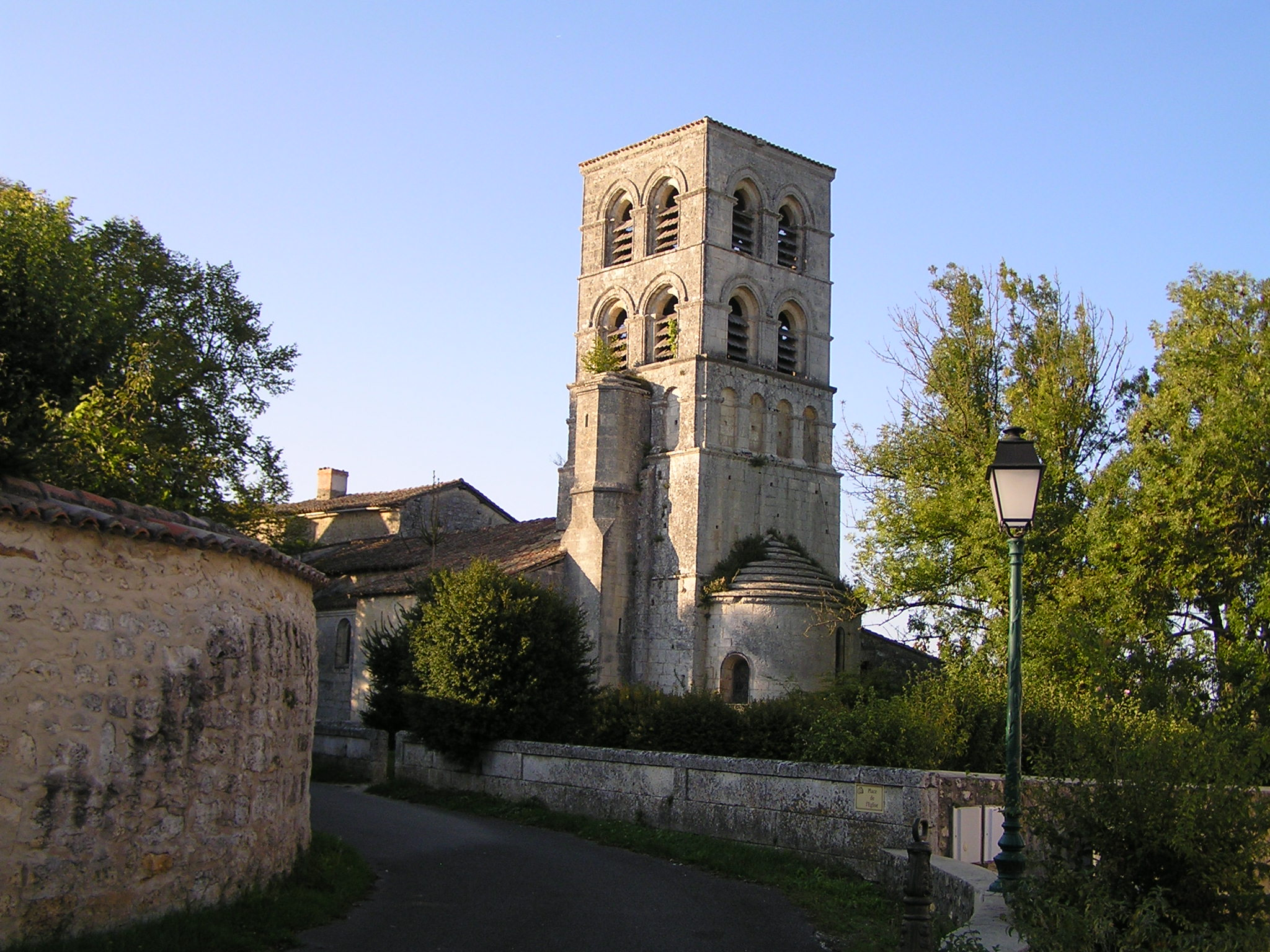

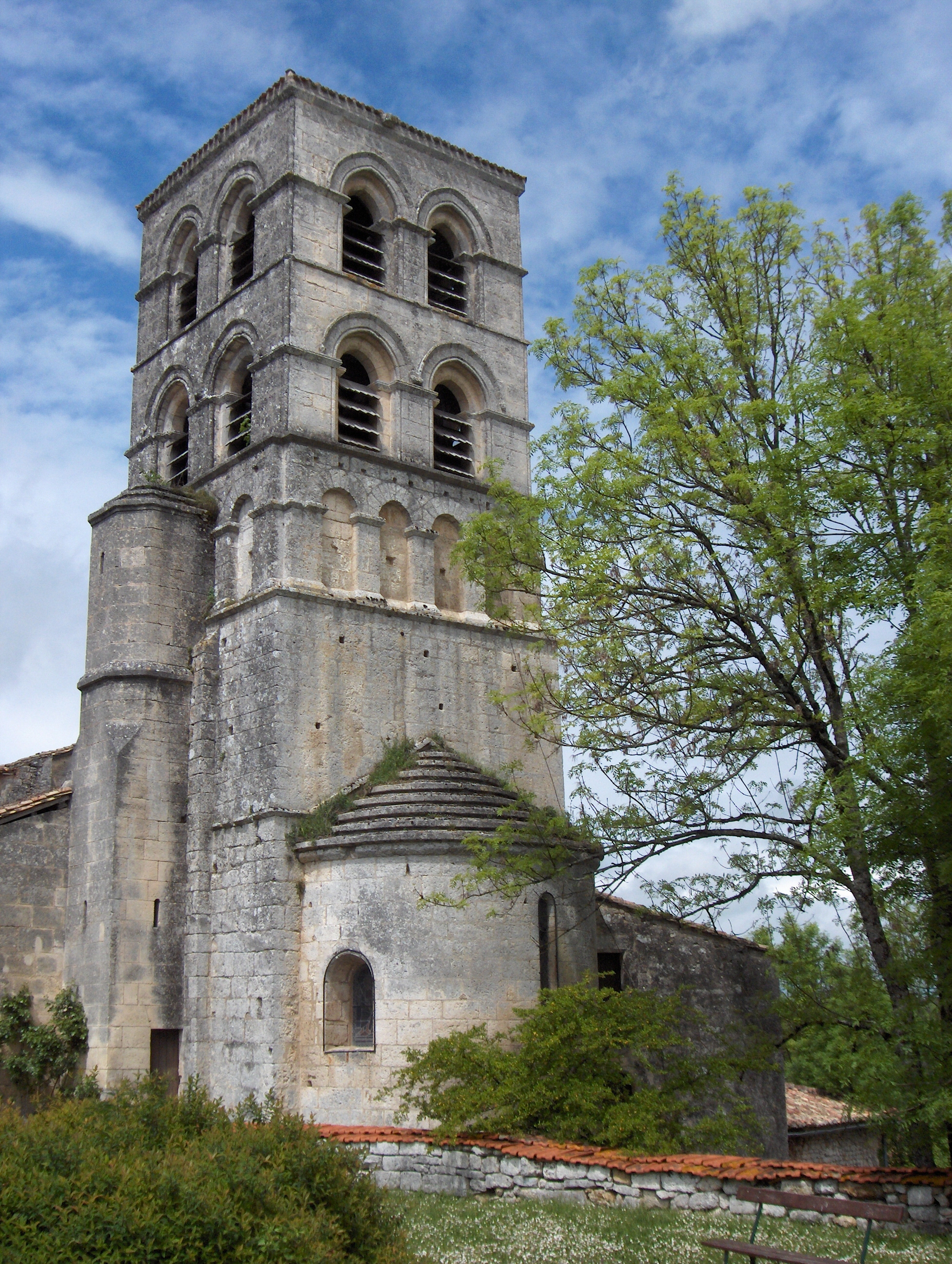

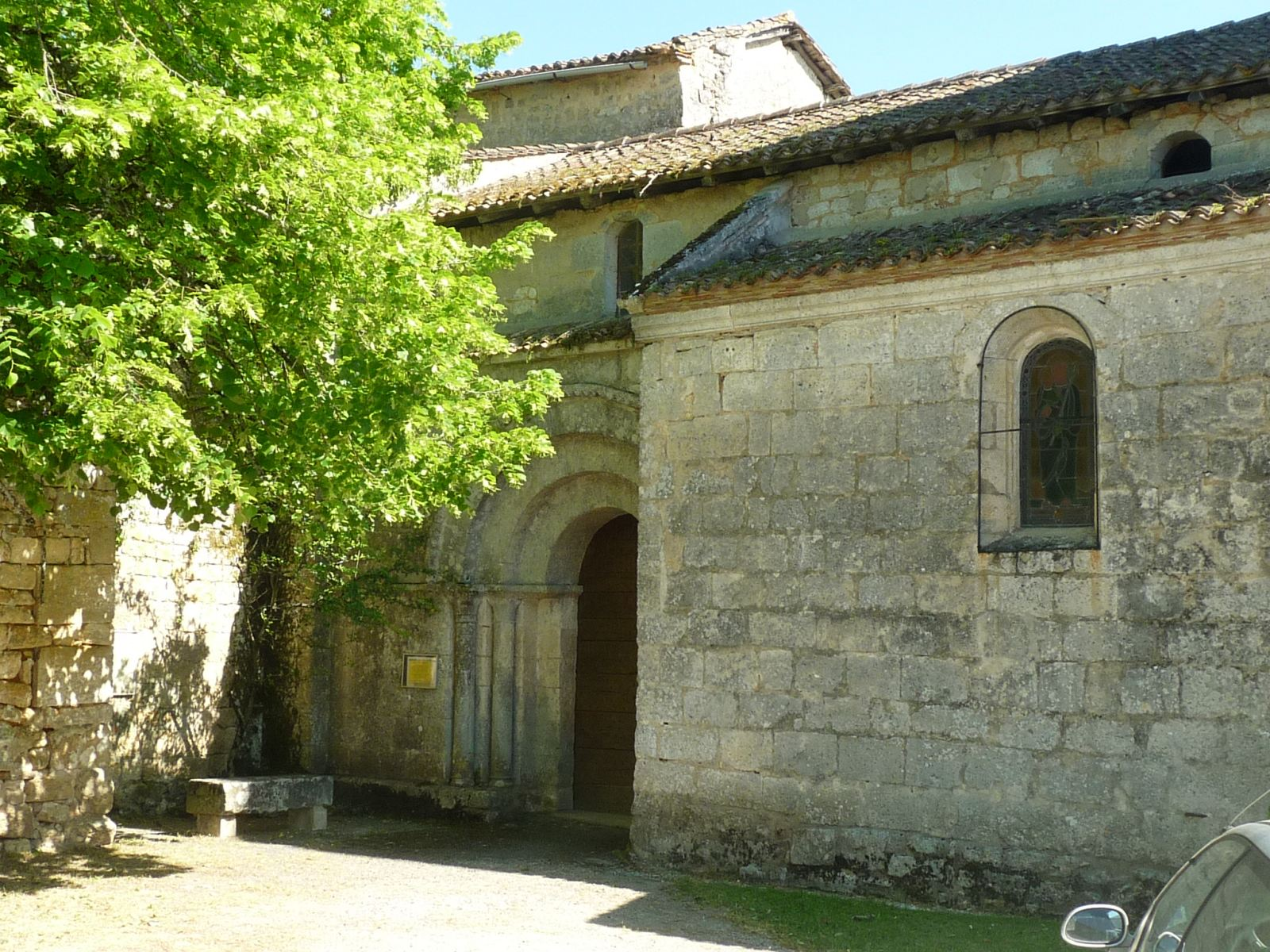
Entrance to the church

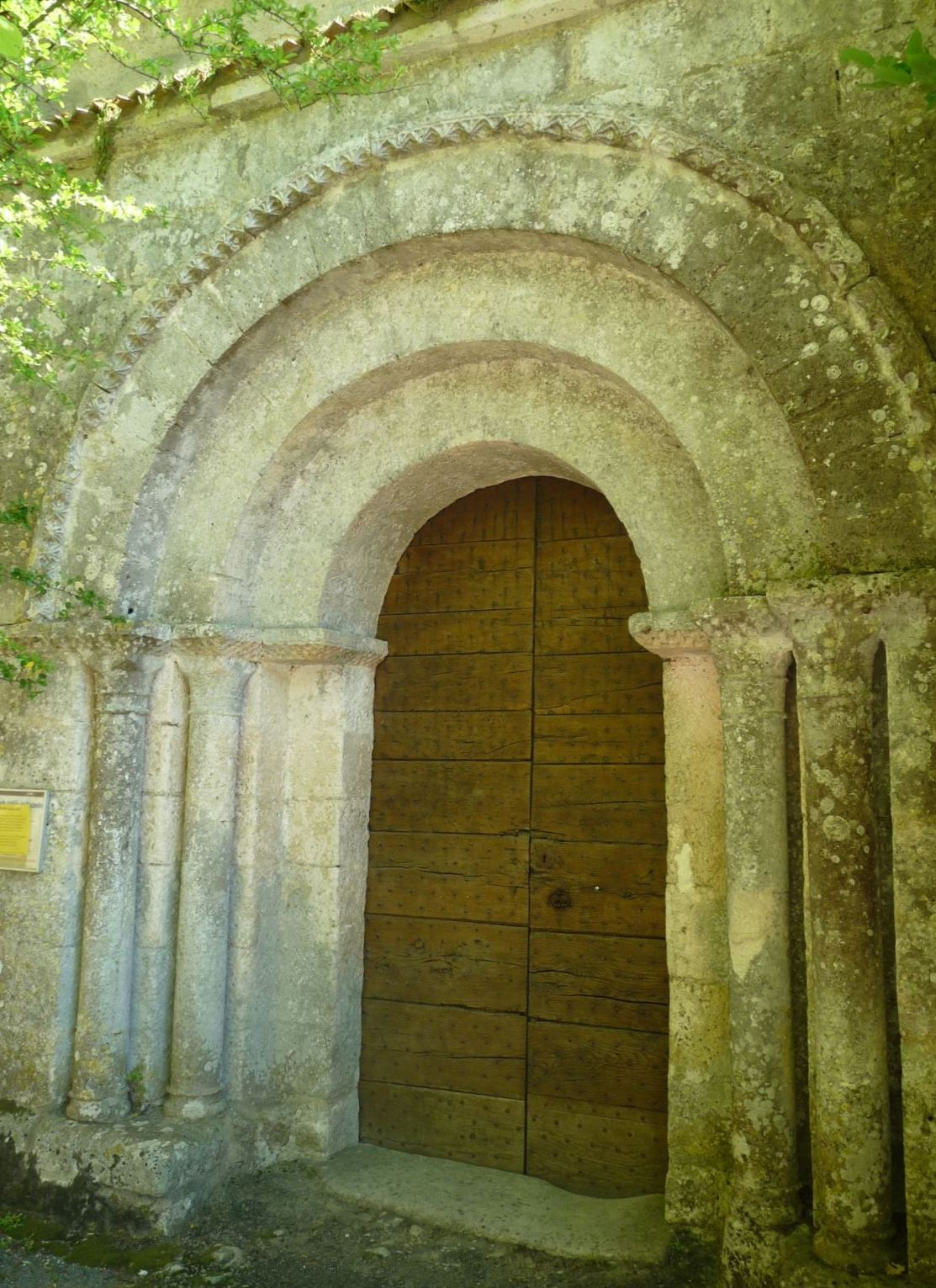

The post office was built in the late 17th century-early 18th century as the vicarage for the church. Its main door is a protected historic monument.

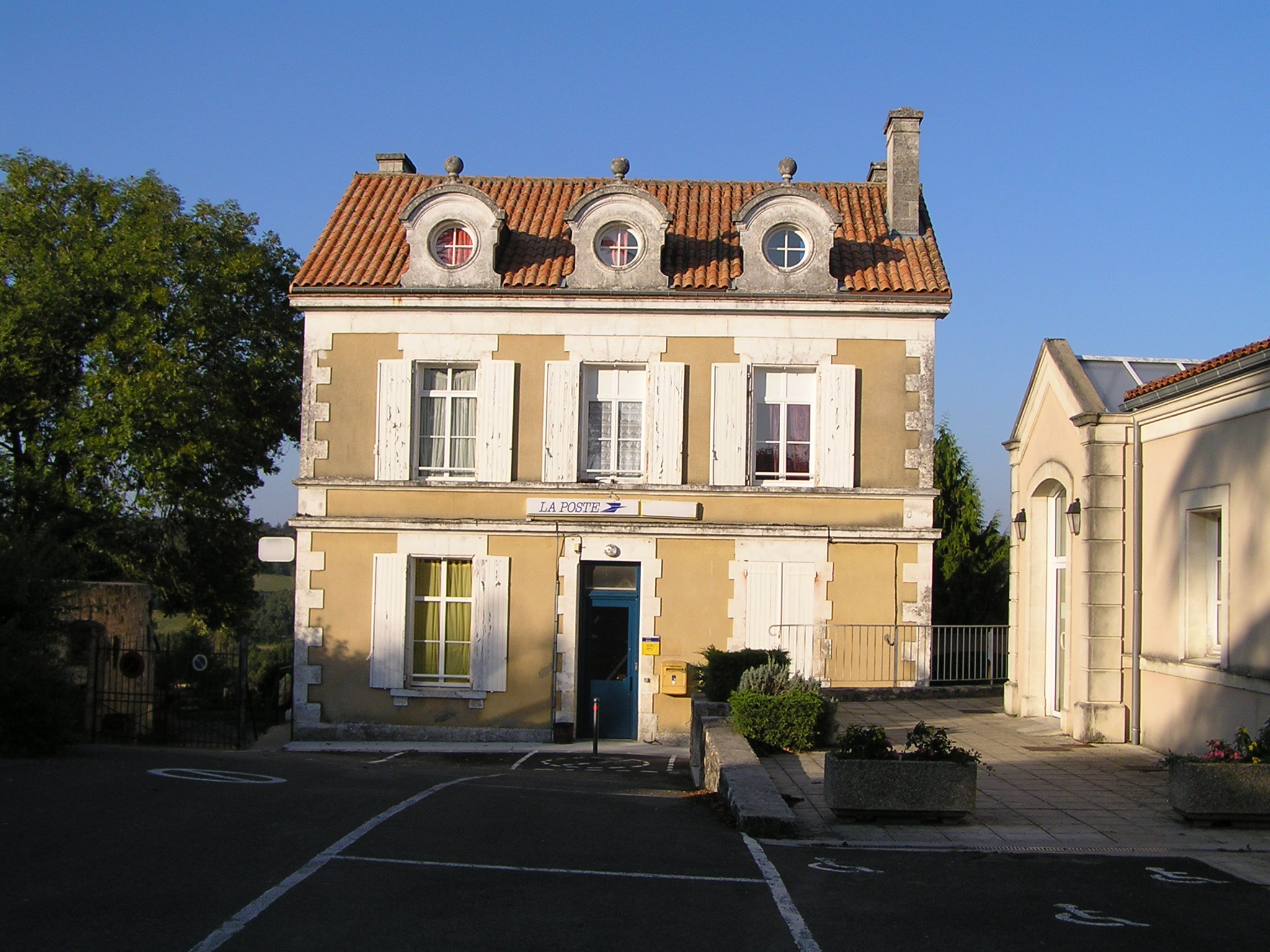
Post office

On the first Sunday in August, a pilgrimage is made to the 6th century hermitage of Notre-Dame de Bellevau, carved out of the rock. The single pillar which supports the roof has Romanesque decorations.

=== Facilities ===
The village of Sers has a church, a post office, a doctor's surgery, a pharmacy, a school, a baker, a butcher-charcuterie, two bars (one with a restaurant and small grocery, the other also a newsagent) and a hairdresser.

The town hall of the commune is located in the village, in the area known as Le Bourg, near the church.

== See also ==
- Communes of the Charente department
