= Boëme =

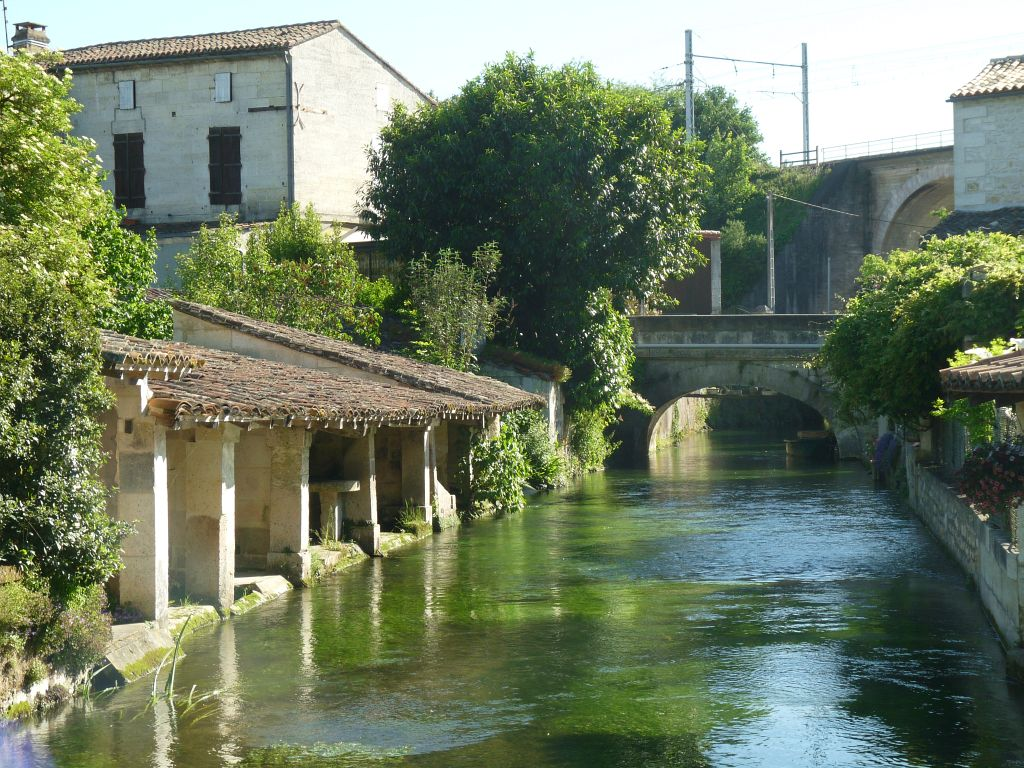
- Boëme in Mouthiers-sur-Boëme

- Location of the river mouth Boëme (Nouvelle-Aquitaine)

Location
- Country: France

Physical characteristics
- Source
  - location: Chadurie
- Mouth
  - location: Nersac
  - coordinates: 45.621°N 0.043°E
- Length: 23.2 km (14.4 mi)
- Basin size: 112 km^{2} (43 mi^{2})

Basin features
- Progression: Charente→ Atlantic Ocean

The Boëme is a river in the southwest of France, a tributary of the Charente. The river begins in the Charente department in the Nouvelle-Aquitaine region. It is sometimes written as Boême and Bohème.

== Course ==
The Boëme flows from south of Angoulême, to Chadurie, near the source of the Né, but diverges west and flows northerly. The river passes under the Des Coutaubières viaduct, through Mouthiers-sur-Boëme and La Couronne. It joins the Charente on the left bank near Nersac, downstream from Angoulême. Many grain and paper mills lie along the Boëme, including the historic Moulin de la Courade.

The river, which is 23.1 kilometres (14.4 mi) long, flows through the following communes (beginning upstream): Chadurie (Chap du ri), Voulgézac, Mouthiers-sur-Boëme, La Couronne, and Nersac. It passes through the cantons of Blanzac-Porcheresse and La Couronne.

== Management ==
The water quality of the river is measured at the N699 bridge in Nersac. The long-term results for water chemistry show that the quality is average. More recent results, since 2011, were classed as good.

The river drains an area of 112 km^{2} (43 mi^{2}), land use in the drainage basin is primarily agricultural (72%), the remainder is forest and semi-natural areas (20%), and urbanized areas (8%).

The river is managed by le Syndicat intercommunal d'aménagement hydraulique (SIAH) of Boëme, which in 2011 completed a series of improvements along the river to restore the river to a more natural state.

== See also ==
- List of rivers of France
