= Claix =

Claix is the name of 2 communes in France:

- Claix, Charente
- Claix, Isère
