= Roullet-Saint-Estèphe =

- Commune
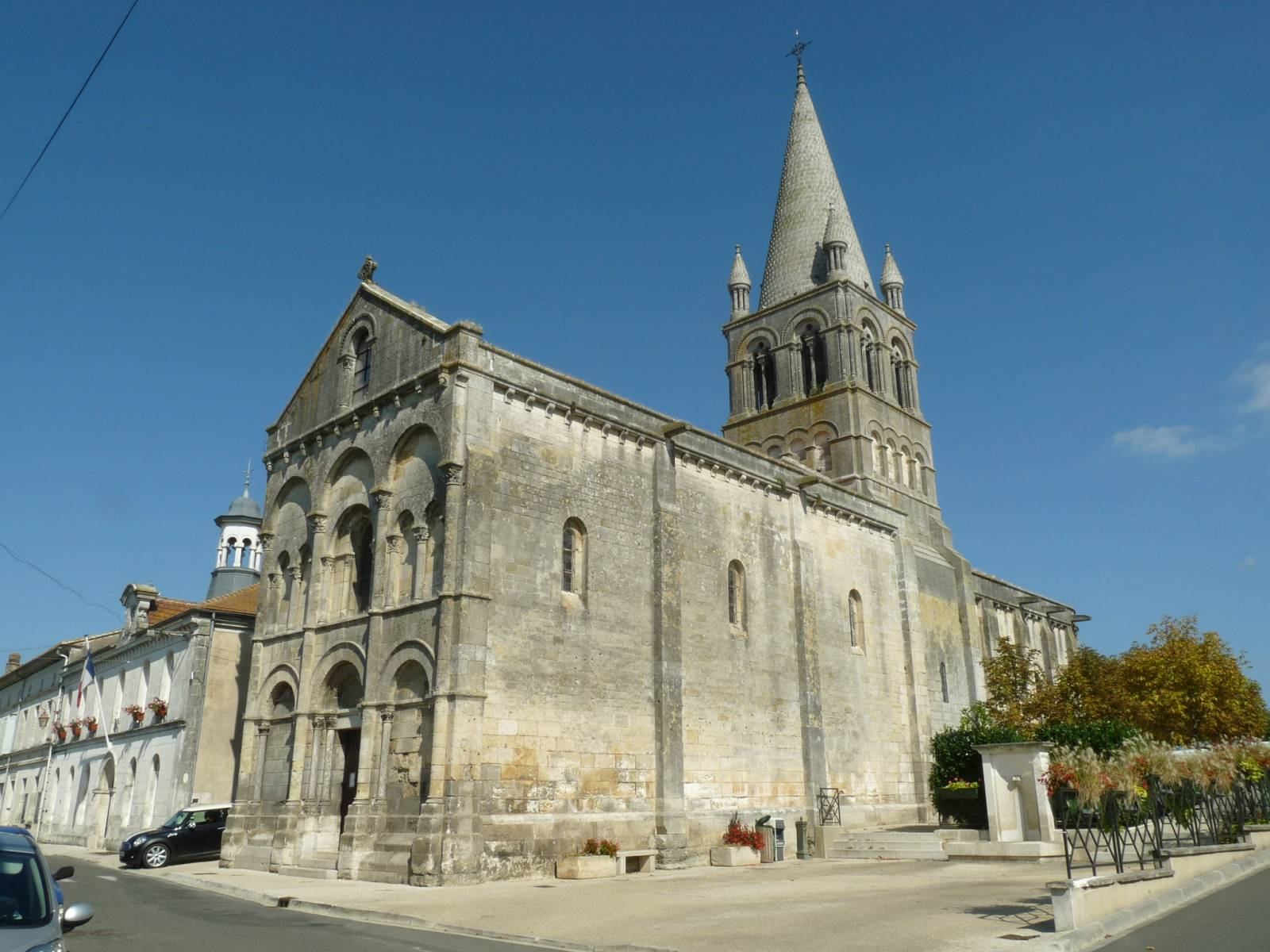
- Église Saint-Cybard de Roullet

- Coat of arms
- Location of Roullet-Saint-Estèphe
- Location within France Location within Nouvelle-Aquitaine
- Coordinates: 45°35′04″N 0°02′54″E
- Country: France
- Region: Nouvelle-Aquitaine
- Department: Charente
- Arrondissement: Angoulême
- Canton: Boëme-Échelle
- Intercommunality: Grand Angoulême

Government
  - Mayor (2020–2026): Gérard Roy
- Area^{1}: 41.50 km^{2} (16.02 sq mi)
- Elevation: 26 m (85 ft)
- Highest elevation: 139 m (456 ft)
- Lowest elevation: 22 m (72 ft)
- Population (2023): 4,357
  - Density: 105.0/km^{2} (271.9/sq mi)
- Time zone: UTC+01:00 (CET)
  - Summer (DST): UTC+02:00 (CEST)
- INSEE/Postal code: 16287 /16440
- ^{1} French Land Register data, which excludes lakes, ponds, glaciers > 1 km^{2} (0.386 sq mi or 247 acres) and river estuaries.

Roullet-Saint-Estèphe (French pronunciation: [ʁulɛ sɛ̃.t‿ɛstɛf]) is a commune in the Charente department in southwestern France.

== Population ==
Historical population

Year	Pop.	±% p.a.
1793	1,136	—
1800	921	−2.95%
1806	1,188	+4.33%
1821	1,291	+0.56%
1831	1,350	+0.45%
1841	1,462	+0.80%
1846	1,464	+0.03%
1851	1,475	+0.15%
1856	1,388	−1.21%
1861	1,395	+0.10%
1866	1,373	−0.32%
1872	1,313	−0.74%
1876	1,245	−1.32%
1881	1,274	+0.46%
1886	1,254	−0.32%
1891	1,187	−1.09%
1896	1,205	+0.30%
1901	1,225	+0.33%

Year	Pop.	±% p.a.
1906	1,232	+0.11%
1911	1,226	−0.10%
1921	1,127	−0.84%
1926	1,179	+0.91%
1931	1,238	+0.98%
1936	1,173	−1.07%
1946	1,235	+0.52%
1954	1,282	+0.47%
1962	1,354	+0.69%
1968	1,538	+2.15%
1975	2,304	+5.94%
1982	2,953	+3.61%
1990	3,378	+1.69%
1999	3,525	+0.47%
2007	3,686	+0.56%
2012	4,109	+2.20%
2017	4,262	+0.73%
2023	4,357	+0.37%

Source: EHESS and INSEE (1968–2023)

== See also ==
- Communes of the Charente department
