= Grand Angoulême =

- Communauté d'agglomération
- Interactive map of Grand Angoulême
- Country: France
- Region: Nouvelle-Aquitaine
- Department: Charente
- No. of communes: {{{nbcomm}}}
- Established: 2017
- Area: 643.6 km^{2} (248.5 sq mi)
- Population (2017): 141,367
  - Density: 219.7/km^{2} (568.9/sq mi)
- Website: www.grandangouleme.fr

Grand Angoulême is the communauté d'agglomération, an intercommunal structure, centred on the city of Angoulême. It is located in the Charente department, in the Nouvelle-Aquitaine region, southwestern France. It was created in January 2017. Its seat is in Angoulême. Its population was 141,367 in 2017, of which 41,740 in Angoulême proper.

== Composition ==
The communauté d'agglomération consists of the following 38 communes:

1. Angoulême
2. Asnières-sur-Nouère
3. Balzac
4. Bouëx
5. Brie
6. Champniers
7. Claix
8. La Couronne
9. Dignac
10. Dirac
11. Fléac
12. Garat
13. Gond-Pontouvre
14. L'Isle-d'Espagnac
15. Jauldes
16. Linars
17. Magnac-sur-Touvre
18. Marsac
19. Mornac
20. Mouthiers-sur-Boëme
21. Nersac
22. Plassac-Rouffiac
23. Puymoyen
24. Roullet-Saint-Estèphe
25. Ruelle-sur-Touvre
26. Saint-Michel
27. Saint-Saturnin
28. Saint-Yrieix-sur-Charente
29. Sers
30. Sireuil
31. Soyaux
32. Torsac
33. Touvre
34. Trois-Palis
35. Vindelle
36. Vœuil-et-Giget
37. Voulgézac
38. Vouzan
