= Magnac-sur-Touvre =

- Commune
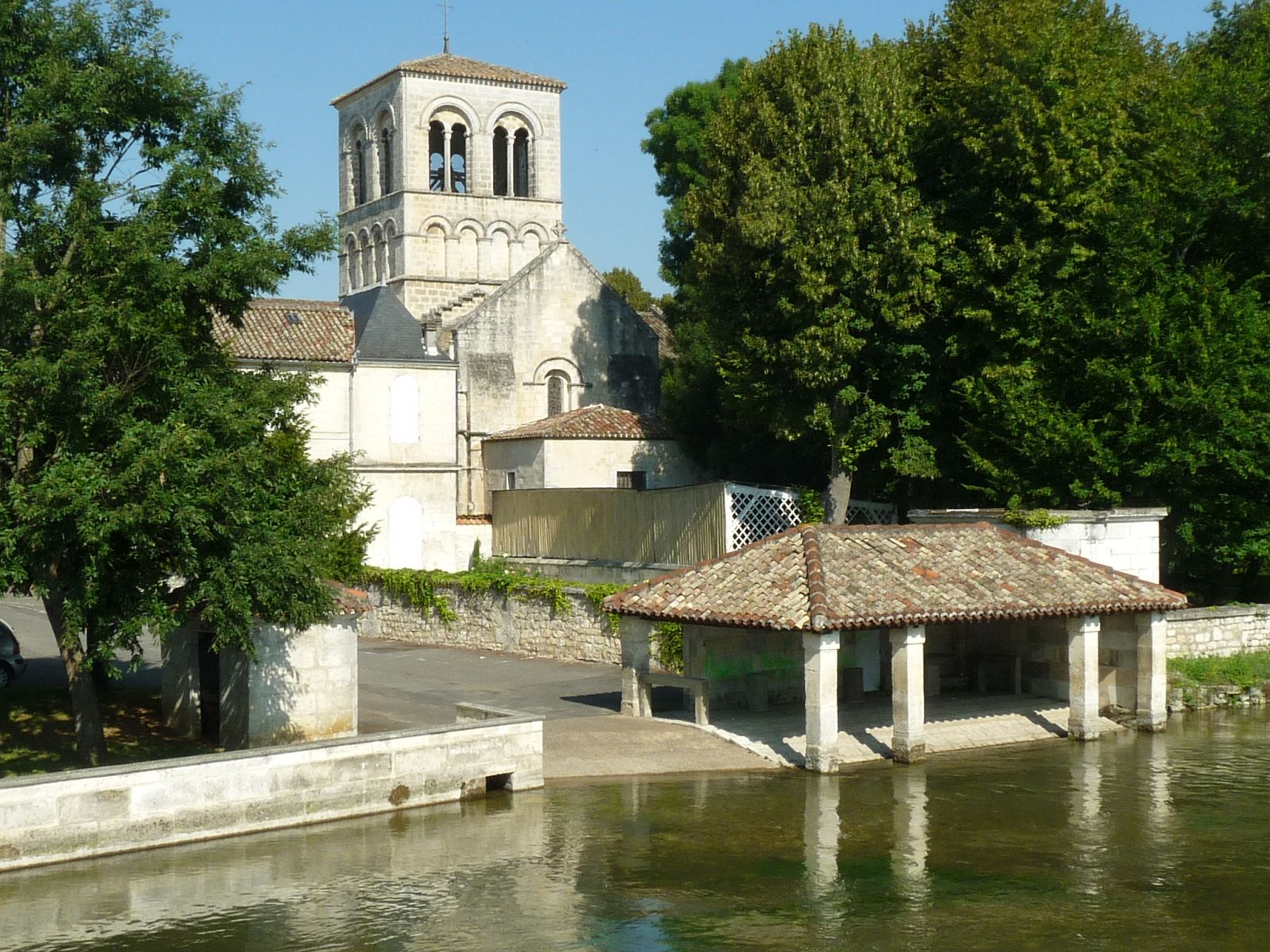
- The church in Magnac-sur-Touvre

- Coat of arms
- Location of Magnac-sur-Touvre
- Location within France Location within Nouvelle-Aquitaine
- Coordinates: 45°39′59″N 0°14′18″E
- Country: France
- Region: Nouvelle-Aquitaine
- Department: Charente
- Arrondissement: Angoulême
- Canton: Touvre-et-Braconne
- Intercommunality: CA Grand Angoulême

Government
  - Mayor (2020–2026): Cyrille Nicolas
- Area^{1}: 7.82 km^{2} (3.02 sq mi)
- Highest elevation: 156 m (512 ft)
- Lowest elevation: 42 m (138 ft)
- Population (2023): 3,255
  - Density: 416/km^{2} (1,080/sq mi)
- Time zone: UTC+01:00 (CET)
  - Summer (DST): UTC+02:00 (CEST)
- INSEE/Postal code: 16199 /16600
- ^{1} French Land Register data, which excludes lakes, ponds, glaciers > 1 km^{2} (0.386 sq mi or 247 acres) and river estuaries.

Magnac-sur-Touvre (French pronunciation: [maɲak syʁ tuvʁ]; lit. 'Magnac-on-Touvre) is a commune in the Charente department in southwestern France.

== Population ==
Historical population

Year	Pop.	±% p.a.
1793	647	—
1800	594	−1.21%
1806	529	−1.91%
1821	602	+0.87%
1831	602	+0.00%
1841	932	+4.47%
1846	979	+0.99%
1851	1,058	+1.56%
1856	1,004	−1.04%
1861	1,037	+0.65%
1866	1,005	−0.62%
1872	1,177	+2.67%
1876	1,187	+0.21%
1881	1,553	+5.52%
1886	1,592	+0.50%
1891	1,619	+0.34%
1896	1,830	+2.48%
1901	1,830	+0.00%

Year	Pop.	±% p.a.
1906	1,820	−0.11%
1911	1,801	−0.21%
1921	1,597	−1.19%
1926	1,612	+0.19%
1931	1,682	+0.85%
1936	1,871	+2.15%
1946	1,857	−0.08%
1954	1,921	+0.42%
1962	2,170	+1.54%
1968	2,393	+1.64%
1975	2,645	+1.44%
1982	2,842	+1.03%
1990	2,843	+0.00%
1999	2,828	−0.06%
2007	3,010	+0.78%
2012	3,058	+0.32%
2017	3,139	+0.52%
2023	3,255	+0.61%

Source: EHESS and INSEE (1968–2023)

== See also ==
- Communes of the Charente department
