= Mouthiers-sur-Boëme =

- Commune
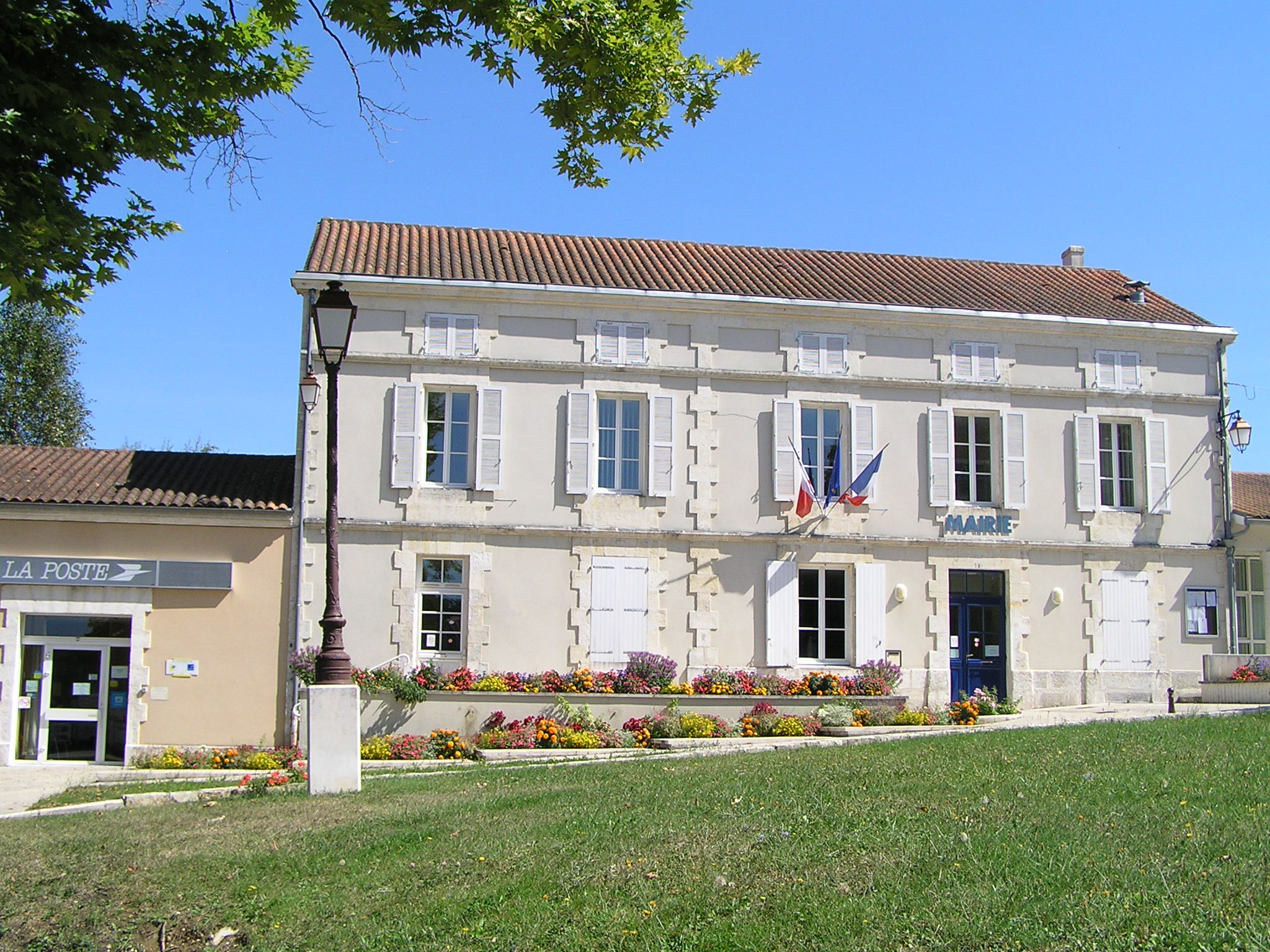
- Town hall

- Coat of arms
- Location of Mouthiers-sur-Boëme
- Location within France Location within Nouvelle-Aquitaine
- Coordinates: 45°33′20″N 0°07′27″E
- Country: France
- Region: Nouvelle-Aquitaine
- Department: Charente
- Arrondissement: Angoulême
- Canton: Boëme-Échelle
- Intercommunality: Grand Angoulême

Government
  - Mayor (2020–2026): Michel Carteret
- Area^{1}: 34.71 km^{2} (13.40 sq mi)
- Elevation: 81 m (266 ft)
- Highest elevation: 153 m (502 ft)
- Lowest elevation: 59 m (194 ft)
- Population (2023): 2,359
  - Density: 67.96/km^{2} (176.0/sq mi)
- Time zone: UTC+01:00 (CET)
  - Summer (DST): UTC+02:00 (CEST)
- INSEE/Postal code: 16236 /16440
- ^{1} French Land Register data, which excludes lakes, ponds, glaciers > 1 km^{2} (0.386 sq mi or 247 acres) and river estuaries.

Mouthiers-sur-Boëme (French pronunciation: [mutje syʁ bɔɛm], literally Mouthiers on Boëme) is a commune in the Charente department in southwestern France.

== Population ==
Historical population

Year	Pop.	±% p.a.
1793	1,282	—
1800	1,428	+1.55%
1806	1,161	−3.39%
1821	1,485	+1.65%
1831	1,485	+0.00%
1841	1,396	−0.62%
1846	1,639	+3.26%
1851	1,529	−1.38%
1856	1,608	+1.01%
1861	1,578	−0.38%
1866	1,540	−0.49%
1872	1,508	−0.35%
1876	1,544	+0.59%
1881	1,526	−0.23%
1886	1,511	−0.20%
1891	1,396	−1.57%
1896	1,331	−0.95%
1901	1,290	−0.62%

Year	Pop.	±% p.a.
1906	1,304	+0.22%
1911	1,366	+0.93%
1921	1,164	−1.59%
1926	1,259	+1.58%
1931	1,249	−0.16%
1936	1,297	+0.76%
1946	1,096	−1.67%
1954	1,238	+1.53%
1962	1,297	+0.58%
1968	1,270	−0.35%
1975	1,400	+1.40%
1982	1,864	+4.17%
1990	2,260	+2.44%
1999	2,260	+0.00%
2007	2,442	+0.97%
2012	2,521	+0.64%
2017	2,436	−0.68%
2023	2,359	−0.53%

Source: EHESS and INSEE (1968–2023)

== See also ==
- Communes of the Charente department
