= Ruelle-sur-Touvre =

- Commune
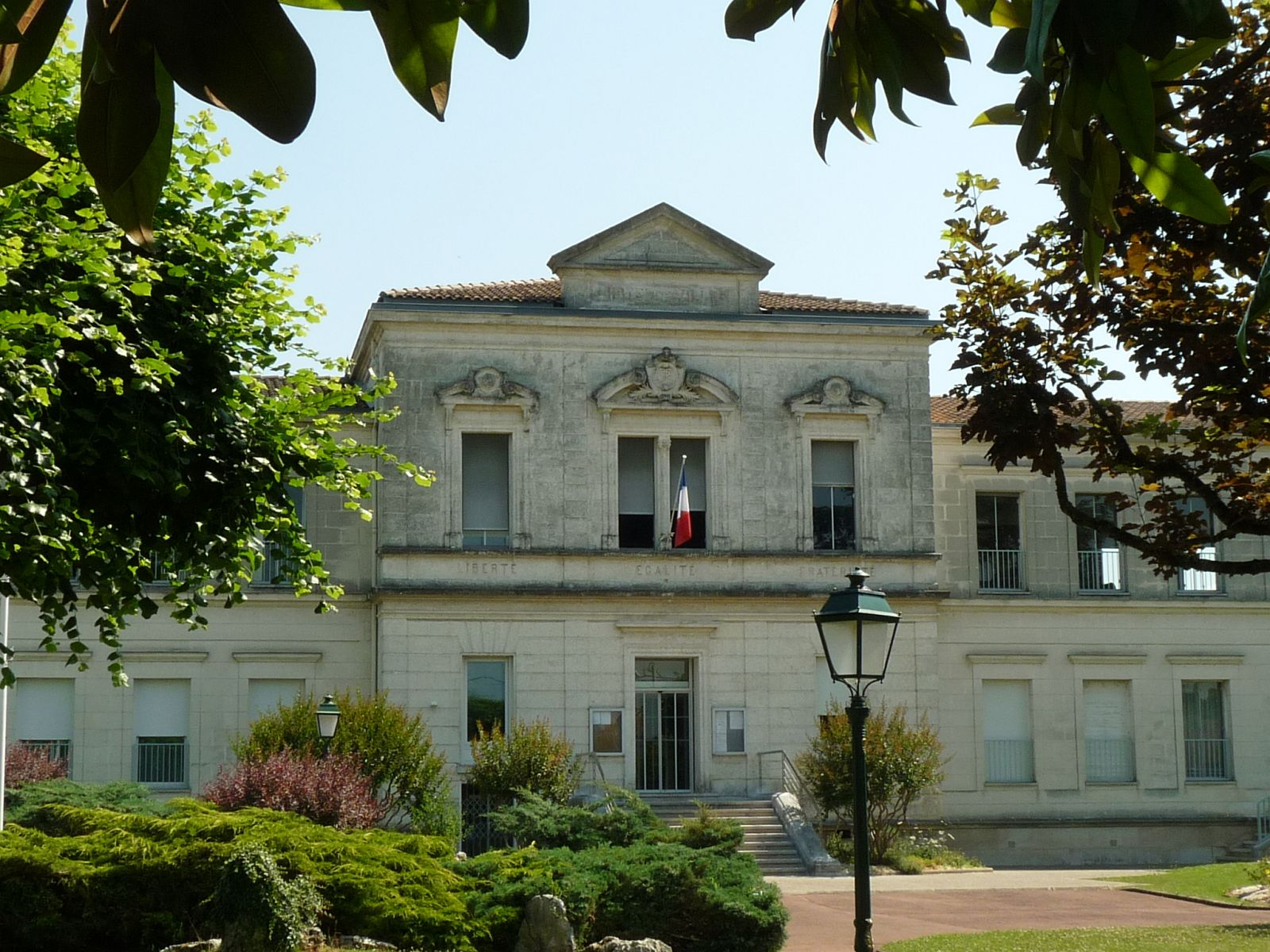
- The town hall in Ruelle-sur-Touvre

- Coat of arms
- Location of Ruelle-sur-Touvre
- Location within France Location within Nouvelle-Aquitaine
- Coordinates: 45°40′43″N 0°13′16″E
- Country: France
- Region: Nouvelle-Aquitaine
- Department: Charente
- Arrondissement: Angoulême
- Canton: Touvre-et-Braconne
- Intercommunality: Grand Angoulême

Government
  - Mayor (2020–2026): Jean-Luc Valantin
- Area^{1}: 10.66 km^{2} (4.12 sq mi)
- Highest elevation: 170 m (560 ft)
- Lowest elevation: 32 m (105 ft)
- Population (2023): 7,408
  - Density: 694.9/km^{2} (1,800/sq mi)
- Time zone: UTC+01:00 (CET)
  - Summer (DST): UTC+02:00 (CEST)
- INSEE/Postal code: 16291 /16600
- ^{1} French Land Register data, which excludes lakes, ponds, glaciers > 1 km^{2} (0.386 sq mi or 247 acres) and river estuaries.

Ruelle-sur-Touvre (French pronunciation: [ʁɥɛl syʁ tuvʁ]; lit. 'Ruelle-on-Touvre') is a commune in the Charente department in southwestern France.

== Population ==
Historical population

Year	Pop.	±% p.a.
1793	981	—
1800	1,189	+2.79%
1806	1,075	−1.67%
1821	1,211	+0.80%
1831	1,215	+0.03%
1841	1,508	+2.18%
1846	1,625	+1.51%
1851	1,579	−0.57%
1856	1,429	−1.98%
1861	1,635	+2.73%
1866	1,733	+1.17%
1872	1,831	+0.92%
1876	2,039	+2.73%
1881	2,554	+4.61%
1886	2,797	+1.83%
1891	2,914	+0.82%
1896	3,615	+4.41%
1901	4,030	+2.20%

Year	Pop.	±% p.a.
1906	4,071	+0.20%
1911	4,187	+0.56%
1921	3,944	−0.60%
1926	3,982	+0.19%
1931	4,264	+1.38%
1936	4,500	+1.08%
1946	4,811	+0.67%
1954	5,366	+1.37%
1962	5,855	+1.10%
1968	6,507	+1.78%
1975	8,152	+3.27%
1982	7,769	−0.69%
1990	7,203	−0.94%
1999	7,220	+0.03%
2007	7,468	+0.42%
2012	7,436	−0.09%
2017	7,201	−0.64%
2023	7,408	+0.47%

Source: EHESS and INSEE (1968–2023)

== International relations ==
The commune has been twinned with Amstetten, Lower Austria since 1972 and Banbridge in Northern Ireland since 1994.

== See also ==
- Communes of the Charente department
