= Touvre =

- Commune
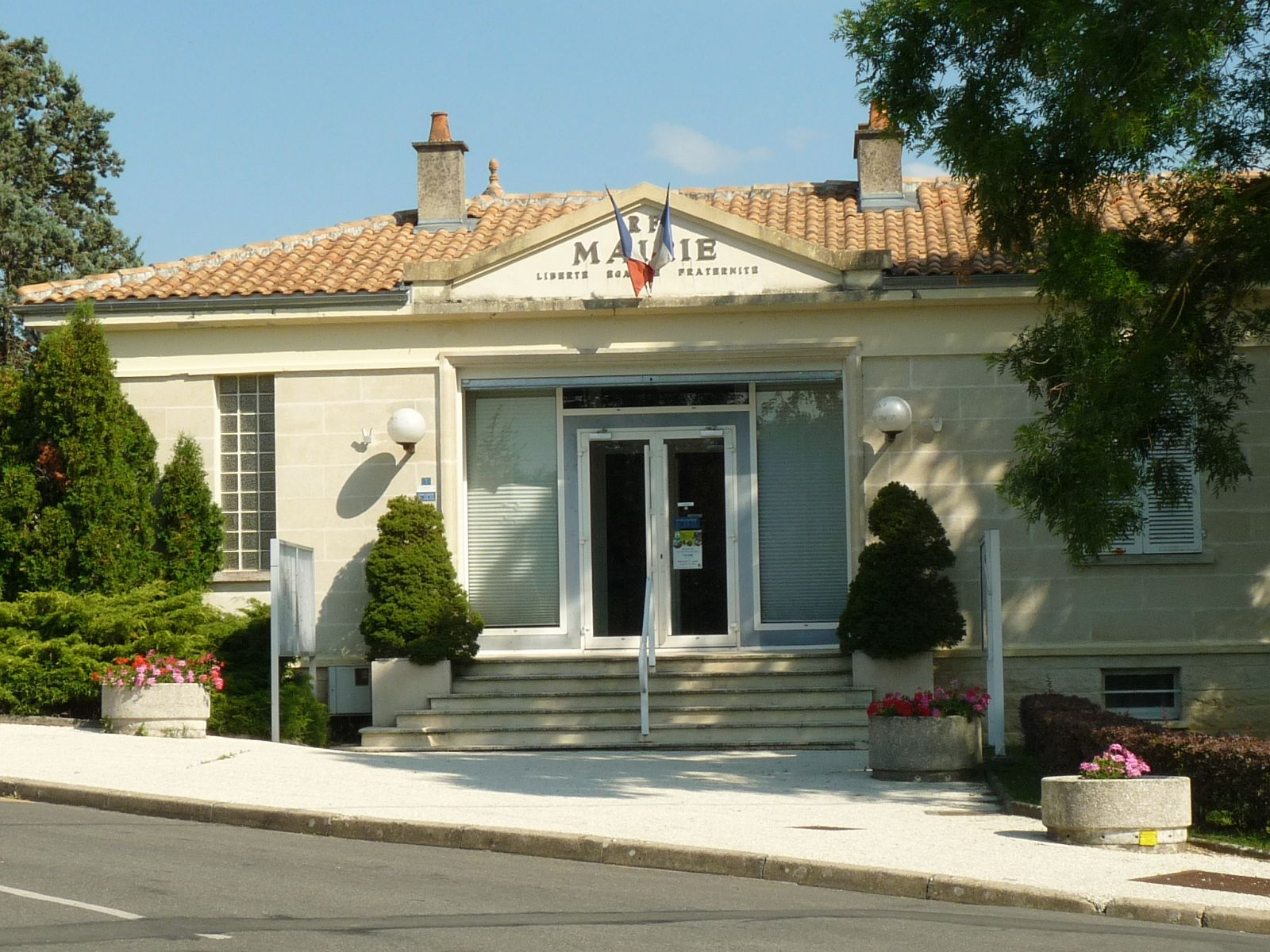
- Town hall

- Coat of arms
- Location of Touvre
- Location within France Location within Nouvelle-Aquitaine
- Coordinates: 45°39′43″N 0°15′35″E
- Country: France
- Region: Nouvelle-Aquitaine
- Department: Charente
- Arrondissement: Angoulême
- Canton: Touvre-et-Braconne
- Intercommunality: Grand Angoulême

Government
  - Mayor (2020–2026): Brigitte Baptiste
- Area^{1}: 9.06 km^{2} (3.50 sq mi)
- Highest elevation: 161 m (528 ft)
- Lowest elevation: 42 m (138 ft)
- Population (2023): 1,150
  - Density: 127/km^{2} (329/sq mi)
- Time zone: UTC+01:00 (CET)
  - Summer (DST): UTC+02:00 (CEST)
- INSEE/Postal code: 16385 /16600
- ^{1} French Land Register data, which excludes lakes, ponds, glaciers > 1 km^{2} (0.386 sq mi or 247 acres) and river estuaries.

Touvre (French pronunciation: [tuvʁ]) is a commune in the Charente department in southwestern France.

== Population ==
Historical population
| Year | Pop. | ±% p.a. |
|---|---|---|
| 1968 | 604 | — |
| 1975 | 785 | +3.82% |
| 1982 | 933 | +2.50% |
| 1990 | 1,020 | +1.12% |
| 1999 | 1,024 | +0.04% |
| 2007 | 1,100 | +0.90% |
| 2012 | 1,187 | +1.53% |
| 2017 | 1,191 | +0.07% |
| 2023 | 1,150 | −0.58% |
Source: INSEE

== See also ==
- Communes of the Charente department
