= Jauldes =

- Commune
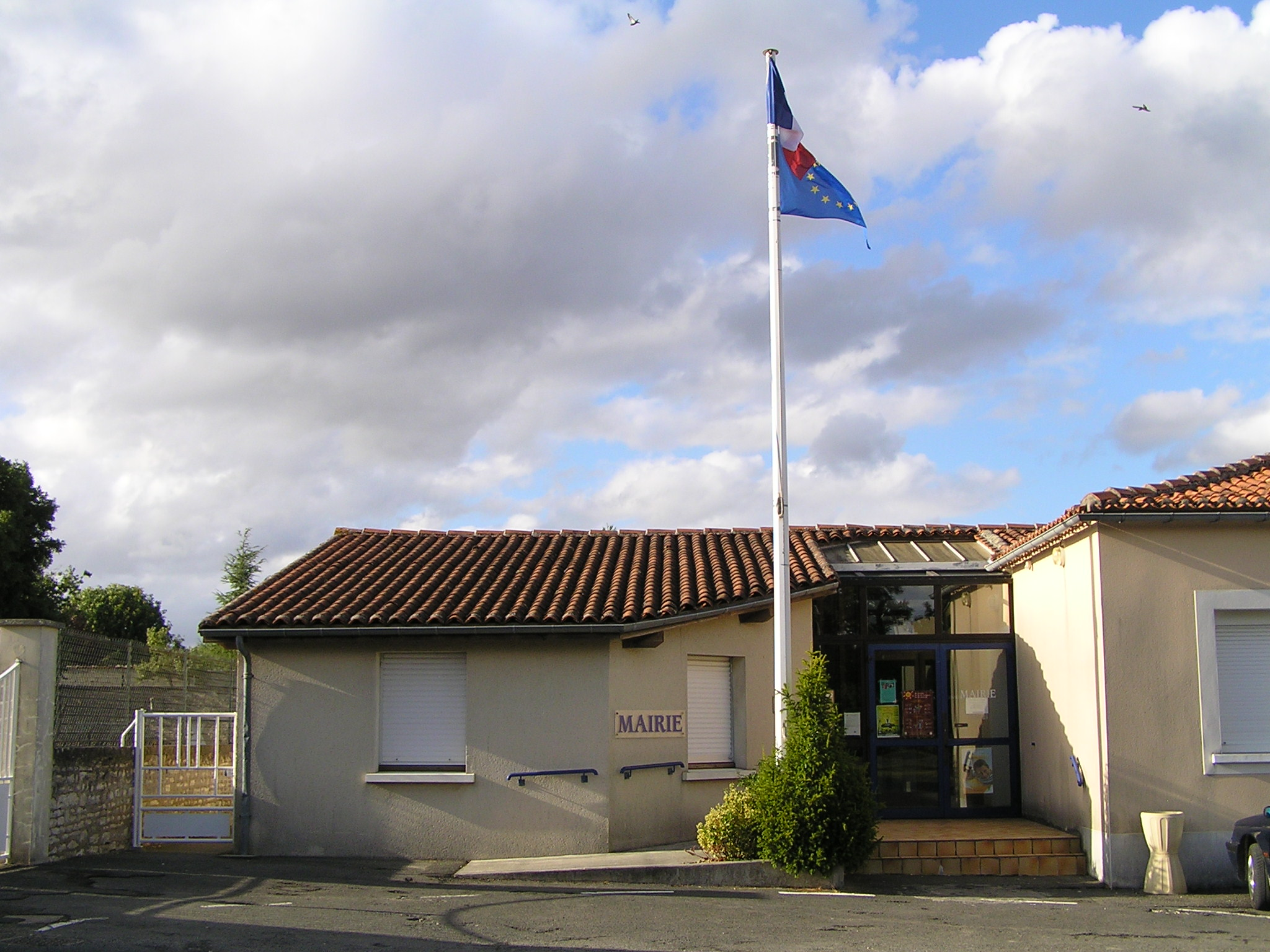
- Town hall
- Location of Jauldes
- Location within France Location within Nouvelle-Aquitaine
- Coordinates: 45°47′11″N 0°15′31″E
- Country: France
- Region: Nouvelle-Aquitaine
- Department: Charente
- Arrondissement: Angoulême
- Canton: Touvre-et-Braconne
- Intercommunality: CA Grand Angoulême

Government
  - Mayor (2020–2026): Sébastien Boivent
- Area^{1}: 25.59 km^{2} (9.88 sq mi)
- Highest elevation: 151 m (495 ft)
- Lowest elevation: 82 m (269 ft)
- Population (2023): 847
  - Density: 33.1/km^{2} (85.7/sq mi)
- Time zone: UTC+01:00 (CET)
  - Summer (DST): UTC+02:00 (CEST)
- INSEE/Postal code: 16168 /16560
- ^{1} French Land Register data, which excludes lakes, ponds, glaciers > 1 km^{2} (0.386 sq mi or 247 acres) and river estuaries.

Jauldes (French pronunciation: [ʒod]) is a commune in the Charente department in southwestern France.

Jauldes belongs to a communaute d'agglomération, which can be defined as the intercommunal structure centred on the city of Angoulême.

Its inhabitants are the Jauldois and the Jauldoises.

== Geography ==
Jauldes is located 17 km at the north of Angoulême and 11 km at the north-west of LaRochefoucald, at 10 km of Saint-Amant-de-Boixe and 12 km of Mansle.

Jauldes is 6 km at the east of the RN10. The RD11 goes through the commune; it serves Anais and Chasseneuil too. The D91, which also goes through the town, serves it to the Angoulême airport.

=== Surrounding hamlets ===
There are many hamlets which surrounds the commune: L'Age, Cussac, la Mornière, Margnac, Magnac, Nouailles, la Motte, le Bois, le Petit Cherves, chez Forgeau for example.

== Geology and topography ==
The ground displays limestone dating from Late Jurassic (Oxfordian age at east, Kimmeridgian at the west). It belongs to the karst de la Rouchefoucauld.

The relief of the commune is "plateau-type", with an average elevation of 120 meters, slightly curved along a north-south axis. The peak of the communal territory reaches 151 meters, near Âge.

== Hydrography ==
Jauldes is localised inside the Charente drainage basin, within the Bassin Adour Garonne.

Any rivers do not cross the municipality. However, at its south-west, the Ruisseau du Moulin des Rivauds originates near La Mercerie and flows towards Anais.

=== Water management ===
The municipal area is governed by the SAGE "Charente" (French acronym: Schéma d'Aménagement et de Gestion des Eaux). The scope of this document is the Charente basin water management, a superficie of 9300 km². The SAGE was approved 19 November 2019. The Territorial basin public establishment develops and executes the SAGE. The Territorial basin public establishment defines, within the scope, the general objectives for the use and for the protection of ressources like groundwater and surface water.

== Population ==
Historical population
Year	Pop.	±% p.a.
1968	542	—
1975	521	−0.56%
1982	577	+1.47%
1990	606	+0.61%
1999	612	+0.11%
2007	714	+1.95%
2012	765	+1.39%
2017	801	+0.92%
2023	847	+0.94%
Source: INSEE

== See also ==
- Communes of the Charente department
