= Canton of Touvre-et-Braconne =

Coordinates: 45.68°N 0.22°E

- Canton
- Situation of the canton of Touvre-et-Braconne in the department of Charente
- Country: France
- Region: Nouvelle-Aquitaine
- Department: Charente
- No. of communes: {{{nbcomm}}}
- Population (2023): 18,892
- INSEE code: 1616

The canton of Touvre-et-Braconne is an administrative division of the Charente department, southwestern France. It was created at the French canton reorganisation which came into effect in March 2015. Its seat is in Ruelle-sur-Touvre.

It consists of the following communes:

1. Brie
2. Jauldes
3. Magnac-sur-Touvre
4. Mornac
5. Ruelle-sur-Touvre
6. Touvre
