= Mornac =

- Commune
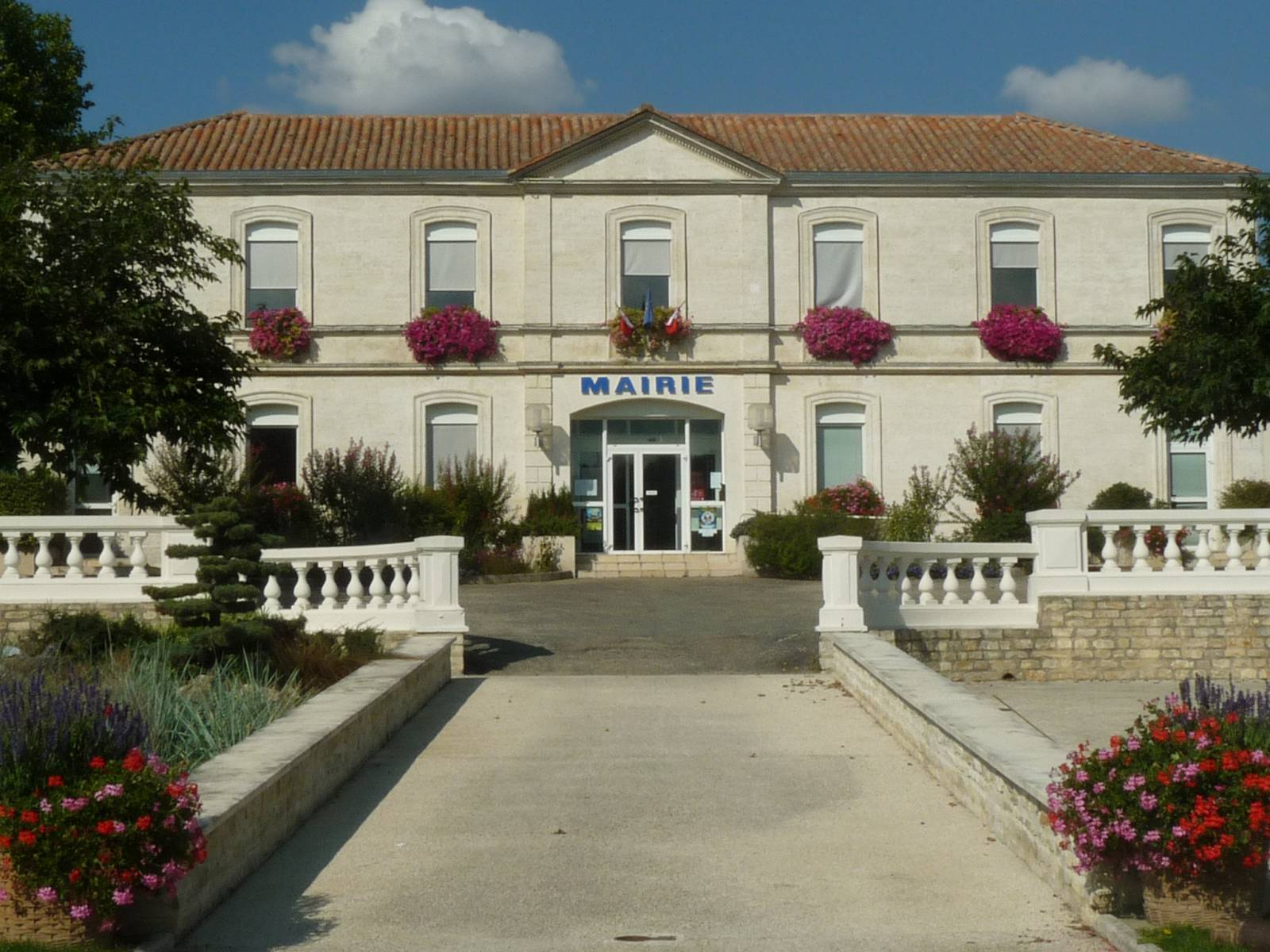
- Town hall
- Location of Mornac
- Location within France Location within Nouvelle-Aquitaine
- Coordinates: 45°40′52″N 0°16′22″E
- Country: France
- Region: Nouvelle-Aquitaine
- Department: Charente
- Arrondissement: Angoulême
- Canton: Touvre-et-Braconne
- Intercommunality: Grand Angoulême

Government
  - Mayor (2020–2026): Francis Laurent
- Area^{1}: 23.48 km^{2} (9.07 sq mi)
- Elevation: 43 m (141 ft)
- Highest elevation: 178 m (584 ft)
- Lowest elevation: 61 m (200 ft)
- Population (2023): 2,107
  - Density: 89.74/km^{2} (232.4/sq mi)
- Time zone: UTC+01:00 (CET)
  - Summer (DST): UTC+02:00 (CEST)
- INSEE/Postal code: 16232 /16600
- ^{1} French Land Register data, which excludes lakes, ponds, glaciers > 1 km^{2} (0.386 sq mi or 247 acres) and river estuaries.

Mornac (French pronunciation: [mɔʁnak]) is a commune in the Charente department in southwestern France.

== Population ==
Historical population

| Year | Pop. | ±% p.a. |
|---|---|---|
| 1793 | 979 | — |
| 1800 | 506 | −9.00% |
| 1806 | 1,015 | +12.30% |
| 1821 | 981 | −0.23% |
| 1831 | 1,146 | +1.57% |
| 1841 | 1,089 | −0.51% |
| 1846 | 1,027 | −1.17% |
| 1851 | 990 | −0.73% |
| 1856 | 971 | −0.39% |
| 1861 | 937 | −0.71% |
| 1866 | 944 | +0.15% |
| 1872 | 893 | −0.92% |
| 1876 | 884 | −0.25% |
| 1881 | 921 | +0.82% |
| 1886 | 895 | −0.57% |
| 1891 | 851 | −1.00% |
| 1896 | 809 | −1.01% |
| 1901 | 806 | −0.07% |

| Year | Pop. | ±% p.a. |
|---|---|---|
| 1906 | 810 | +0.10% |
| 1911 | 791 | −0.47% |
| 1921 | 710 | −1.07% |
| 1926 | 649 | −1.78% |
| 1931 | 666 | +0.52% |
| 1936 | 725 | +1.71% |
| 1946 | 692 | −0.46% |
| 1954 | 707 | +0.27% |
| 1962 | 914 | +3.26% |
| 1968 | 727 | −3.74% |
| 1975 | 1,138 | +6.61% |
| 1982 | 1,381 | +2.80% |
| 1990 | 1,800 | +3.37% |
| 1999 | 1,864 | +0.39% |
| 2007 | 2,114 | +1.59% |
| 2012 | 2,205 | +0.85% |
| 2017 | 2,172 | −0.30% |
| 2023 | 2,107 | −0.51% |

Source: EHESS and INSEE (1968-2023)

== See also ==
- Communes of the Charente department
