= Vœuil-et-Giget =

- Commune
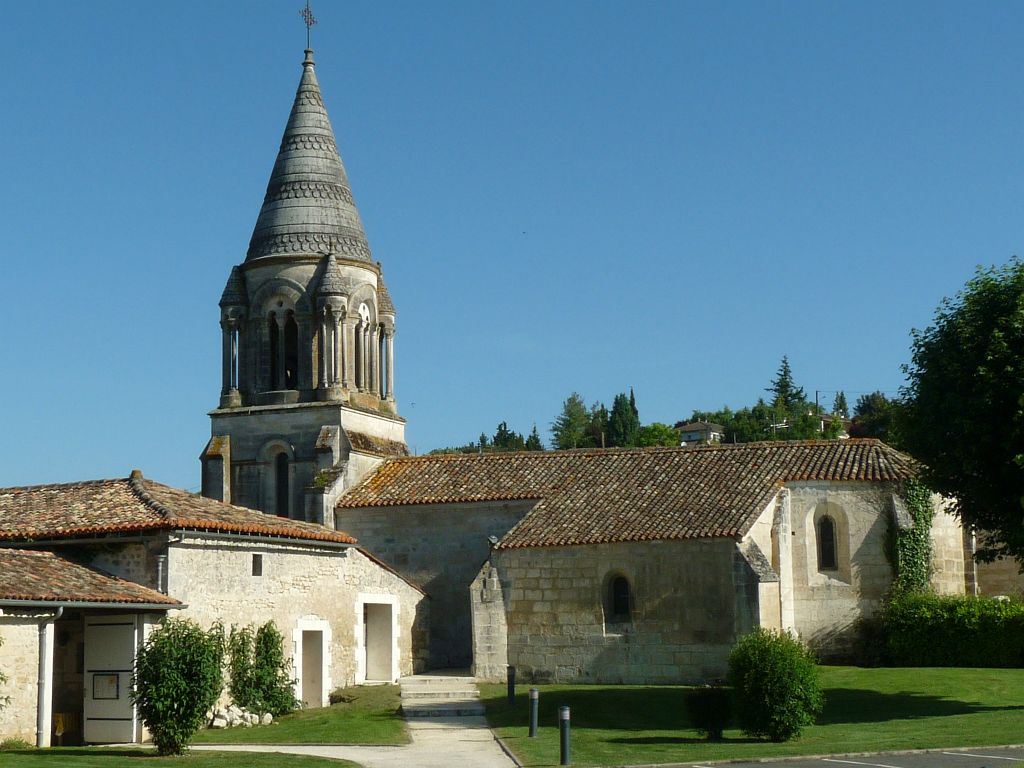
- The church in Vœuil
- Location of Vœuil-et-Giget
- Location within France Location within Nouvelle-Aquitaine
- Coordinates: 45°35′13″N 0°09′19″E
- Country: France
- Region: Nouvelle-Aquitaine
- Department: Charente
- Arrondissement: Angoulême
- Canton: Boëme-Échelle
- Intercommunality: Grand Angoulême

Government
  - Mayor (2020–2026): Monique Chiron
- Area^{1}: 8.48 km^{2} (3.27 sq mi)
- Elevation: 112 m (367 ft)
- Highest elevation: 147 m (482 ft)
- Lowest elevation: 55 m (180 ft)
- Population (2023): 1,591
  - Density: 188/km^{2} (486/sq mi)
- Time zone: UTC+01:00 (CET)
  - Summer (DST): UTC+02:00 (CEST)
- INSEE/Postal code: 16418 /16400
- ^{1} French Land Register data, which excludes lakes, ponds, glaciers > 1 km^{2} (0.386 sq mi or 247 acres) and river estuaries.

Vœuil-et-Giget (French pronunciation: [vœj e ʒiʒɛ]) is a commune in the Charente department in southwestern France.

== Population ==
Historical population
Year	Pop.	±% p.a.
1968	744	—
1975	918	+3.05%
1982	1,009	+1.36%
1990	1,344	+3.65%
1999	1,436	+0.74%
2007	1,533	+0.82%
2012	1,576	+0.55%
2017	1,509	−0.87%
2023	1,591	+0.89%
Source: INSEE

== See also ==
- Communes of the Charente department
