= Plassac-Rouffiac =

- Commune
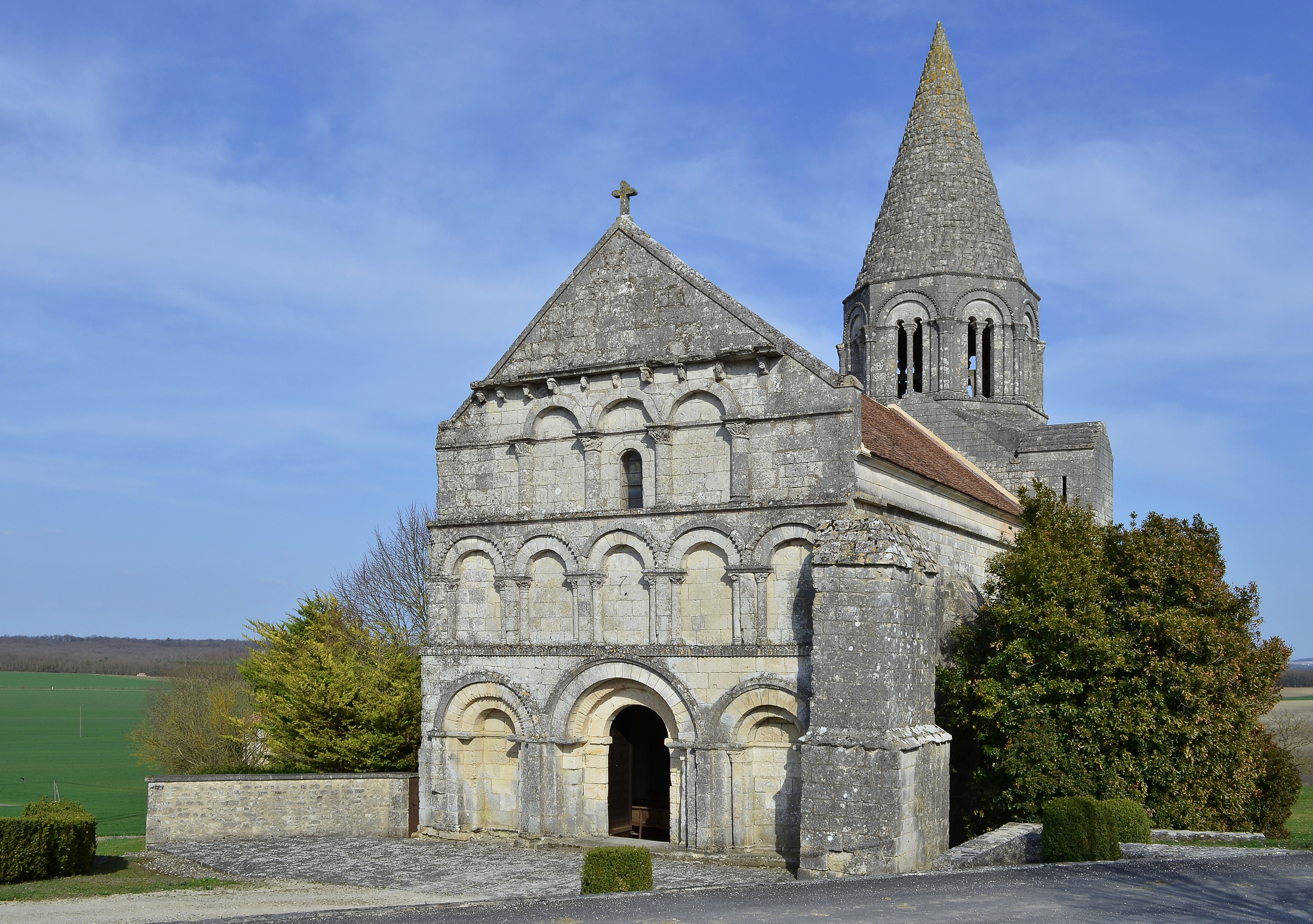
- The church in Plassac-Rouffiac
- Location of Plassac-Rouffiac
- Location within France Location within Nouvelle-Aquitaine
- Coordinates: 45°31′38″N 0°03′57″E
- Country: France
- Region: Nouvelle-Aquitaine
- Department: Charente
- Arrondissement: Angoulême
- Canton: Boëme-Échelle
- Intercommunality: CA Grand Angoulême

Government
  - Mayor (2020–2026): Serge David
- Area^{1}: 11.97 km^{2} (4.62 sq mi)
- Elevation: 142 m (466 ft)
- Highest elevation: 190 m (620 ft)
- Lowest elevation: 98 m (322 ft)
- Population (2023): 371
  - Density: 31.0/km^{2} (80.3/sq mi)
- Time zone: UTC+01:00 (CET)
  - Summer (DST): UTC+02:00 (CEST)
- INSEE/Postal code: 16263 /16250
- ^{1} French Land Register data, which excludes lakes, ponds, glaciers > 1 km^{2} (0.386 sq mi or 247 acres) and river estuaries.

Plassac-Rouffiac (French pronunciation: [plasak ʁufjak]) is a commune in the Charente department in southwestern France.

== Population ==
Historical population
Year	Pop.	±% p.a.
1968	297	—
1975	307	+0.47%
1982	304	−0.14%
1990	297	−0.29%
1999	321	+0.87%
2007	343	+0.83%
2012	404	+3.33%
2017	401	−0.15%
2023	371	−1.29%
Source: INSEE

== See also ==
- Communes of the Charente department
