= Canton of Boëme-Échelle =

Coordinates: 45.58°N 0.04°E

- Canton
- Situation of the canton of Boëme-Échelle in the department of Charente
- Country: France
- Region: Nouvelle-Aquitaine
- Department: Charente
- No. of communes: {{{nbcomm}}}
- Population (2023): 18,233
- INSEE code: 1604

The canton of Boëme-Échelle is an administrative division of the Charente department, southwestern France. It was created at the French canton reorganisation which came into effect in March 2015. Its seat is in Roullet-Saint-Estèphe.

It consists of the following communes:

1. Bouëx
2. Claix
3. Dignac
4. Dirac
5. Garat
6. Mouthiers-sur-Boëme
7. Plassac-Rouffiac
8. Roullet-Saint-Estèphe
9. Sers
10. Torsac
11. Vœuil-et-Giget
12. Voulgézac
13. Vouzan
