= Torsac =

- Commune
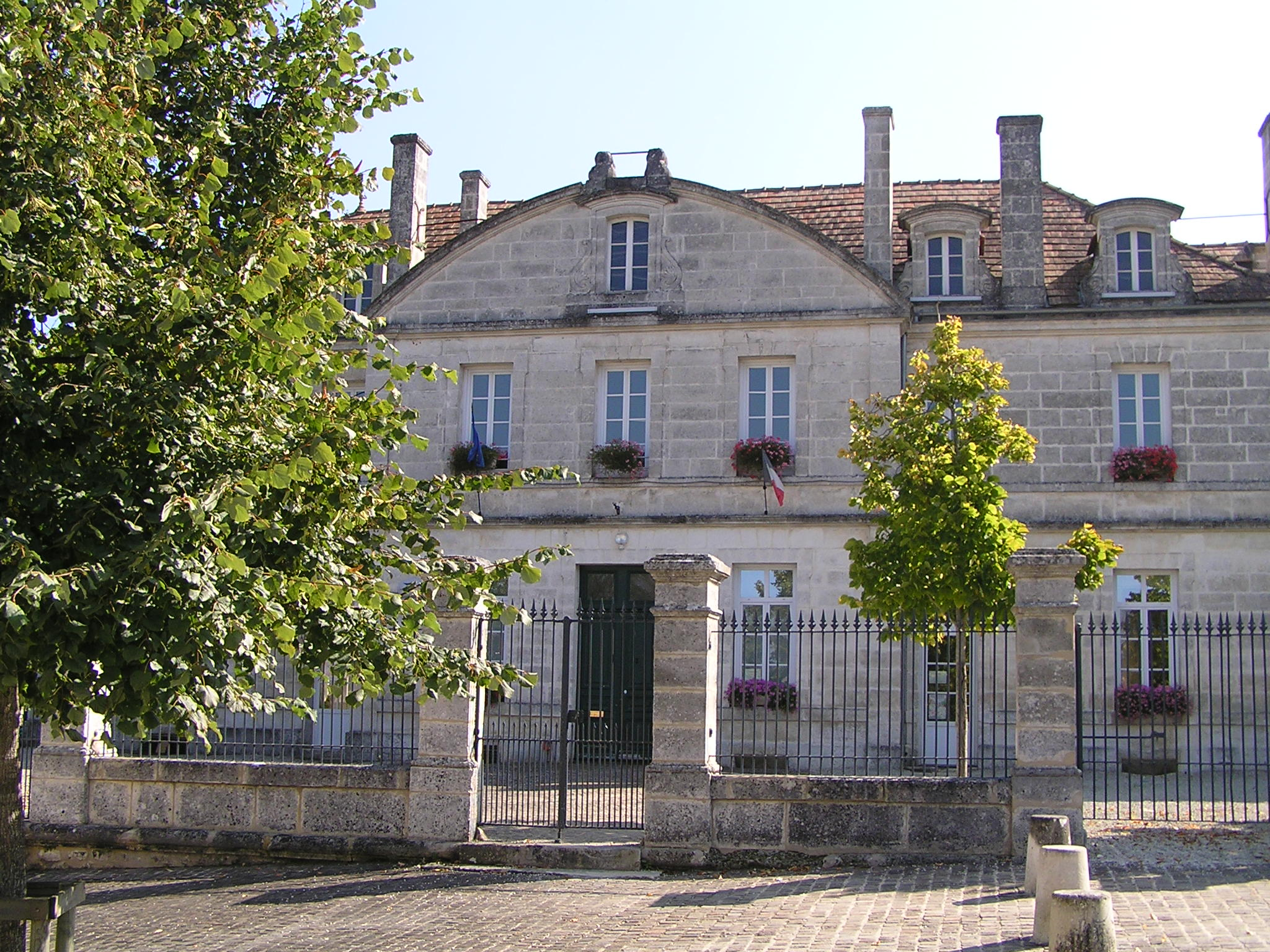
- Town hall
- Location of Torsac
- Location within France Location within Nouvelle-Aquitaine
- Coordinates: 45°33′50″N 0°12′56″E
- Country: France
- Region: Nouvelle-Aquitaine
- Department: Charente
- Arrondissement: Angoulême
- Canton: Boëme-Échelle
- Intercommunality: Grand Angoulême

Government
  - Mayor (2020–2026): Catherine Bréard
- Area^{1}: 28.55 km^{2} (11.02 sq mi)
- Elevation: 40 m (130 ft)
- Highest elevation: 175 m (574 ft)
- Lowest elevation: 73 m (240 ft)
- Population (2023): 740
  - Density: 26/km^{2} (67/sq mi)
- Time zone: UTC+01:00 (CET)
  - Summer (DST): UTC+02:00 (CEST)
- INSEE/Postal code: 16382 /16410
- ^{1} French Land Register data, which excludes lakes, ponds, glaciers > 1 km^{2} (0.386 sq mi or 247 acres) and river estuaries.

Torsac (French pronunciation: [tɔʁsak]) is a commune in Charente, a department in southwestern France.

== Population ==
Historical population
Year	Pop.	±% p.a.
1968	352	—
1975	385	+1.29%
1982	464	+2.70%
1990	731	+5.85%
1999	718	−0.20%
2007	764	+0.78%
2012	779	+0.39%
2017	749	−0.78%
2023	740	−0.20%
Source: INSEE

== See also ==
- Communes of the Charente department
