= Bouëx =

- Commune
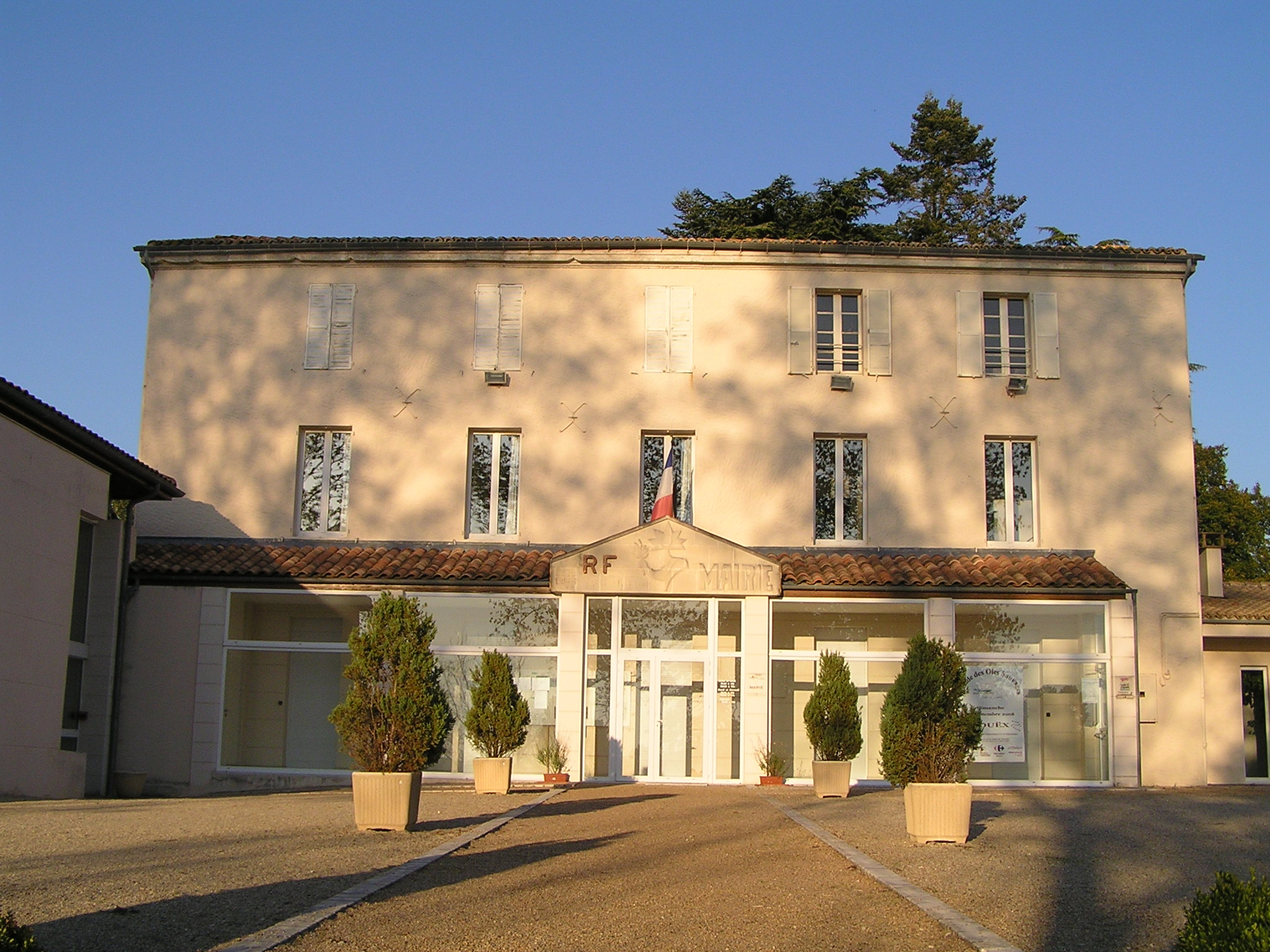
- Town hall
- Location of Bouëx
- Location within France Location within Nouvelle-Aquitaine
- Coordinates: 45°37′01″N 0°19′08″E
- Country: France
- Region: Nouvelle-Aquitaine
- Department: Charente
- Arrondissement: Angoulême
- Canton: Boëme-Échelle
- Intercommunality: Grand Angoulême

Government
  - Mayor (2020–2026): Michel Andrieux
- Area^{1}: 15.64 km^{2} (6.04 sq mi)
- Elevation: 185 m (607 ft)
- Highest elevation: 191 m (627 ft)
- Lowest elevation: 71 m (233 ft)
- Population (2023): 825
  - Density: 52.7/km^{2} (137/sq mi)
- Time zone: UTC+01:00 (CET)
  - Summer (DST): UTC+02:00 (CEST)
- INSEE/Postal code: 16055 /16410
- ^{1} French Land Register data, which excludes lakes, ponds, glaciers > 1 km^{2} (0.386 sq mi or 247 acres) and river estuaries.

Bouëx is a commune in the Charente department in southwestern France.

== Population ==
Historical population
| Year | Pop. | ±% p.a. |
|---|---|---|
| 1968 | 441 | — |
| 1975 | 533 | +2.74% |
| 1982 | 639 | +2.63% |
| 1990 | 747 | +1.97% |
| 1999 | 808 | +0.88% |
| 2007 | 898 | +1.33% |
| 2012 | 933 | +0.77% |
| 2017 | 892 | −0.89% |
| 2023 | 825 | −1.29% |
Source: INSEE

== See also ==
- Communes of the Charente department
