= Claix, Charente =

Claix
- Commune
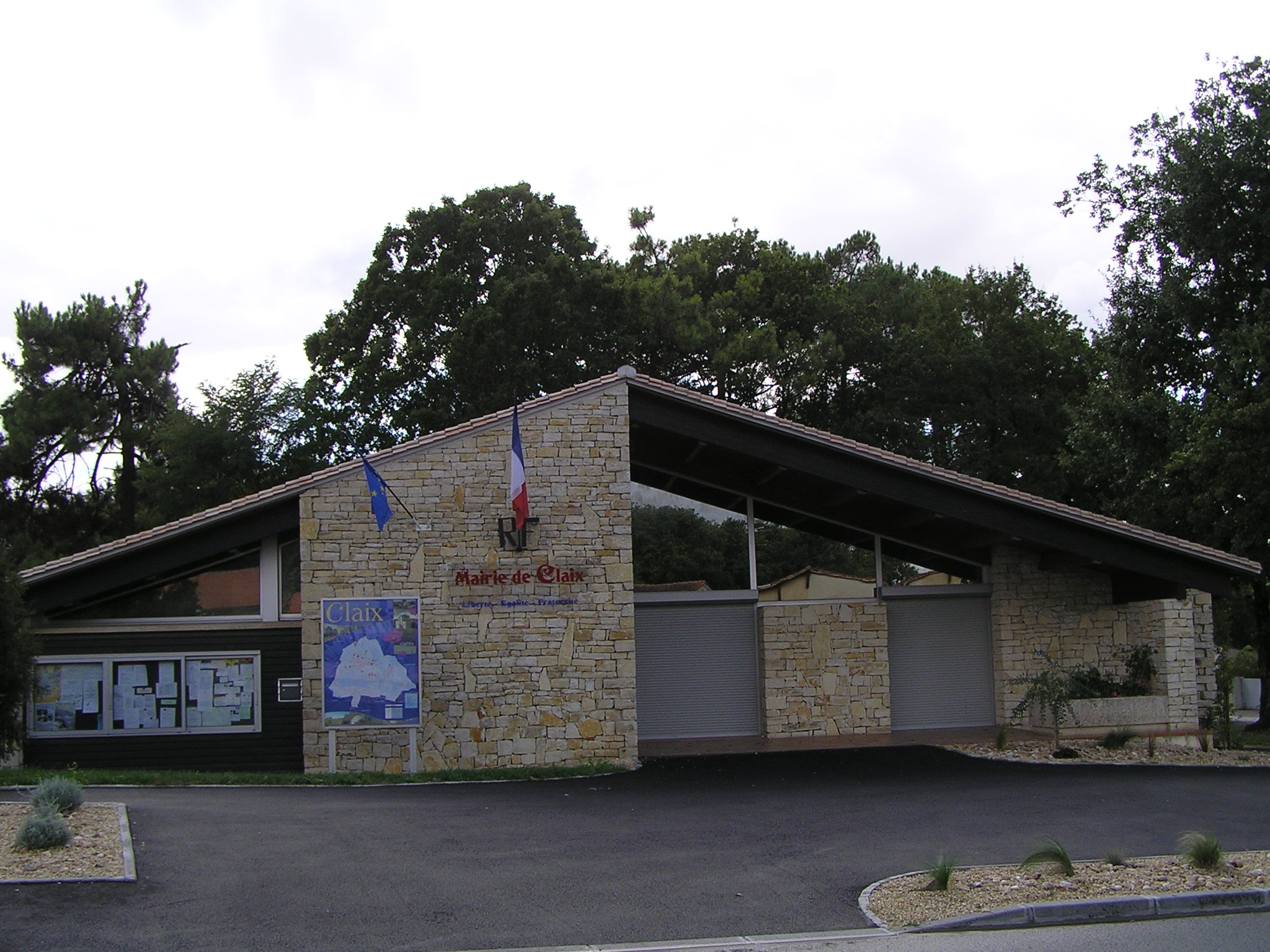
- Town hall
- Location of Claix
- Location within France Location within Nouvelle-Aquitaine
- Coordinates: 45°33′22″N 0°02′37″E
- Country: France
- Region: Nouvelle-Aquitaine
- Department: Charente
- Arrondissement: Angoulême
- Canton: Boëme-Échelle
- Intercommunality: Grand Angoulême

Government
  - Mayor (2020–2026): Dominique Pérez
- Area^{1}: 14.87 km^{2} (5.74 sq mi)
- Elevation: 150 m (490 ft)
- Highest elevation: 148 m (486 ft)
- Lowest elevation: 50 m (160 ft)
- Population (2023): 1,049
  - Density: 70.54/km^{2} (182.7/sq mi)
- Time zone: UTC+01:00 (CET)
  - Summer (DST): UTC+02:00 (CEST)
- INSEE/Postal code: 16101 /16440
- ^{1} French Land Register data, which excludes lakes, ponds, glaciers > 1 km^{2} (0.386 sq mi or 247 acres) and river estuaries.

Claix (French pronunciation: [klɛ]) is a commune in the Charente department in southwestern France.

== Population ==
Historical population
Year	Pop.	±% p.a.
1968	512	—
1975	542	+0.82%
1982	672	+3.12%
1990	816	+2.46%
1999	747	−0.98%
2007	879	+2.05%
2012	994	+2.49%
2017	1,029	+0.69%
2023	1,049	+0.32%
Source: INSEE

== See also ==
- Communes of the Charente department
