= Dignac =

- Commune
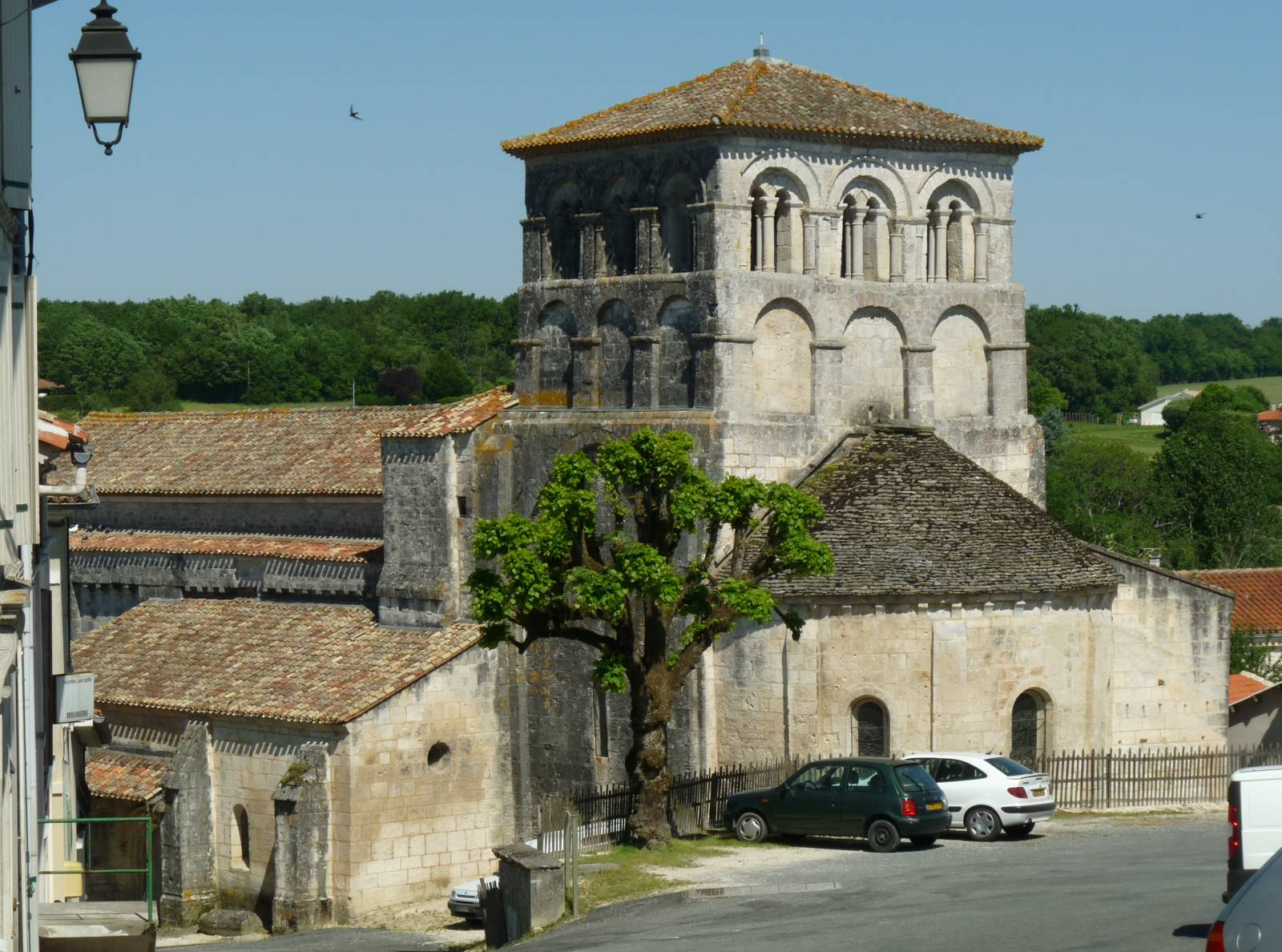
- The church in Dignac

- Coat of arms
- Location of Dignac
- Location within France Location within Nouvelle-Aquitaine
- Coordinates: 45°33′26″N 0°16′52″E
- Country: France
- Region: Nouvelle-Aquitaine
- Department: Charente
- Arrondissement: Angoulême
- Canton: Boëme-Échelle
- Intercommunality: Grand Angoulême

Government
  - Mayor (2020–2026): Françoise Delage
- Area^{1}: 27.66 km^{2} (10.68 sq mi)
- Highest elevation: 224 m (735 ft)
- Lowest elevation: 105 m (344 ft)
- Population (2023): 1,362
  - Density: 49.24/km^{2} (127.5/sq mi)
- Time zone: UTC+01:00 (CET)
  - Summer (DST): UTC+02:00 (CEST)
- INSEE/Postal code: 16119 /16410
- ^{1} French Land Register data, which excludes lakes, ponds, glaciers > 1 km^{2} (0.386 sq mi or 247 acres) and river estuaries.

Dignac (French pronunciation: [diɲak]; Occitan: Dinhac) is a commune in the Charente department in southwestern France.

== Population ==
Historical population
Year	Pop.	±% p.a.
1968	843	—
1975	896	+0.87%
1982	1,147	+3.59%
1990	1,230	+0.88%
1999	1,280	+0.44%
2007	1,289	+0.09%
2012	1,309	+0.31%
2017	1,322	+0.20%
2023	1,362	+0.50%
Source: INSEE

== See also ==
- Communes of the Charente department
