= Dirac, Charente =

Dirac
- Commune
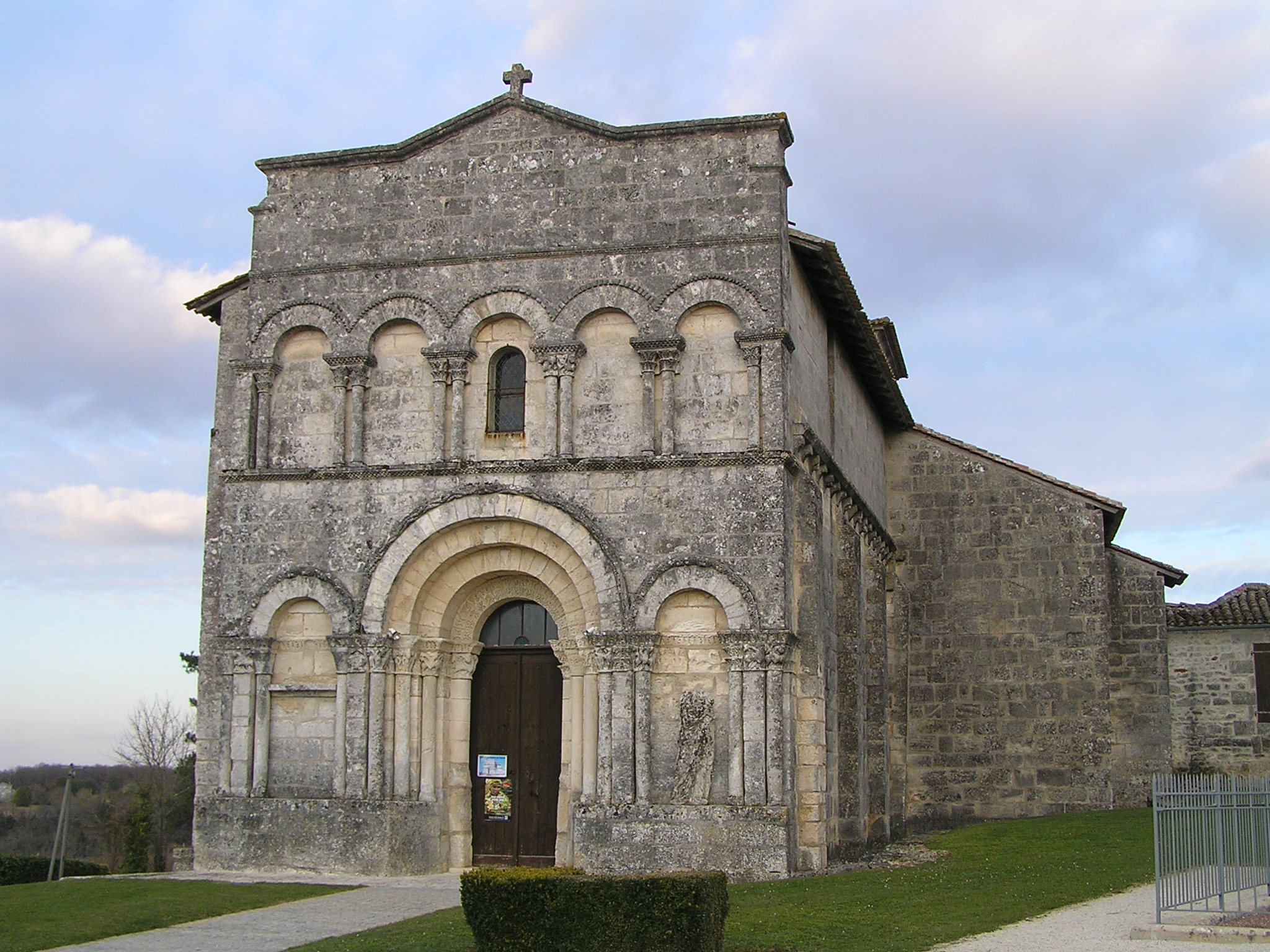
- The church in Dirac
- Location of Dirac
- Location within France Location within Nouvelle-Aquitaine
- Coordinates: 45°36′19″N 0°14′57″E
- Country: France
- Region: Nouvelle-Aquitaine
- Department: Charente
- Arrondissement: Angoulême
- Canton: Boëme-Échelle
- Intercommunality: Grand Angoulême

Government
  - Mayor (2023–2026): Bénédicte Montegu
- Area^{1}: 29.29 km^{2} (11.31 sq mi)
- Elevation: 148 m (486 ft)
- Highest elevation: 183 m (600 ft)
- Lowest elevation: 65 m (213 ft)
- Population (2023): 1,516
  - Density: 51.76/km^{2} (134.1/sq mi)
- Time zone: UTC+01:00 (CET)
  - Summer (DST): UTC+02:00 (CEST)
- INSEE/Postal code: 16120 /16410
- ^{1} French Land Register data, which excludes lakes, ponds, glaciers > 1 km^{2} (0.386 sq mi or 247 acres) and river estuaries.

Dirac (French pronunciation: [diʁak]) is a commune in the Charente department in the Nouvelle-Aquitaine region in southwestern France.

== Population ==
Historical population
| Year | Pop. | ±% p.a. |
|---|---|---|
| 1968 | 579 | — |
| 1975 | 807 | +4.86% |
| 1982 | 1,037 | +3.65% |
| 1990 | 1,260 | +2.46% |
| 1999 | 1,336 | +0.65% |
| 2007 | 1,432 | +0.87% |
| 2012 | 1,532 | +1.36% |
| 2017 | 1,518 | −0.18% |
| 2023 | 1,516 | −0.02% |
Source: INSEE

== See also ==
- Communes of the Charente department
