= Garat, Charente =

Garat
- Commune
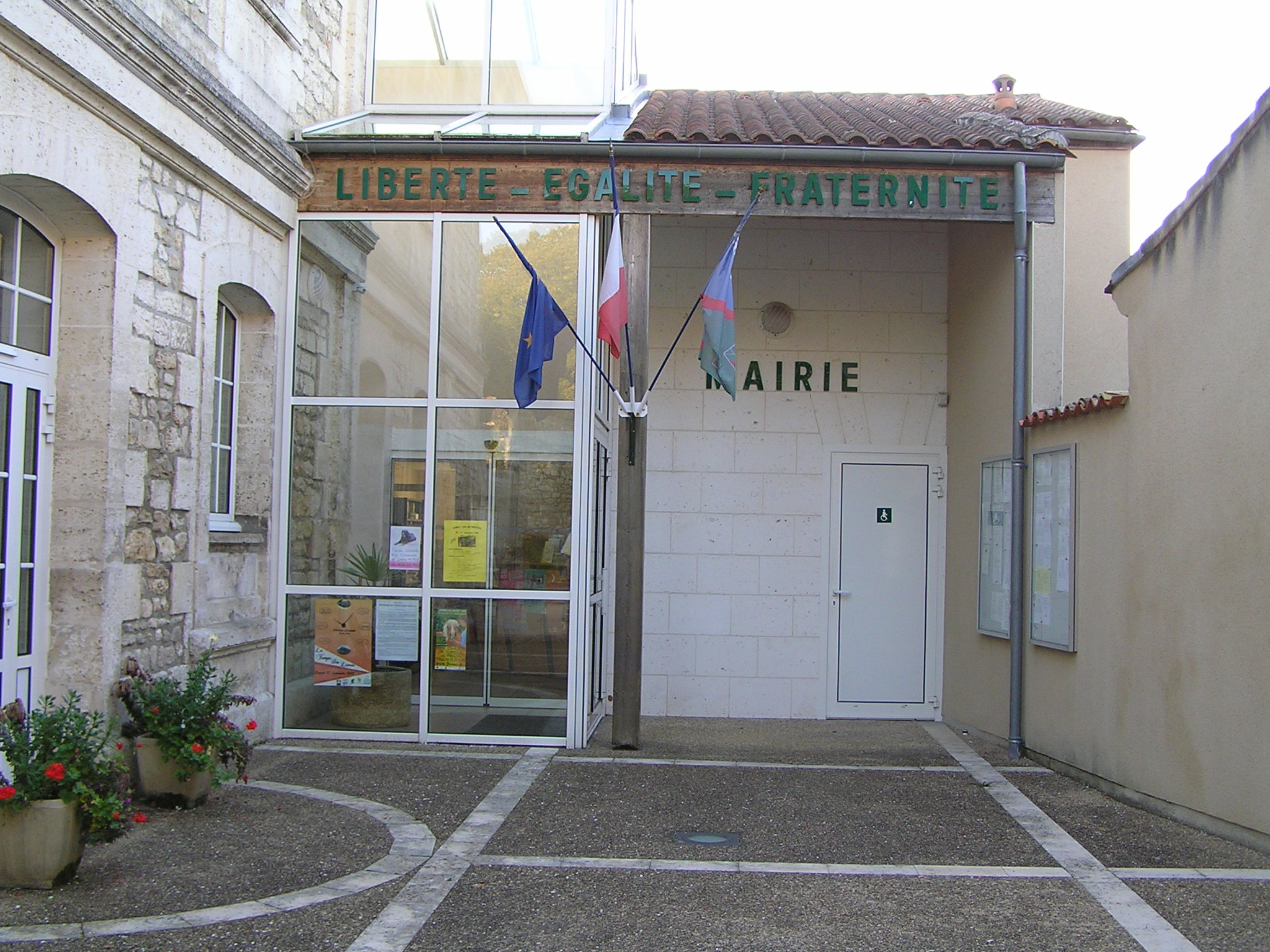
- Town hall
- Location of Garat
- Location within France Location within Nouvelle-Aquitaine
- Coordinates: 45°37′36″N 0°15′50″E
- Country: France
- Region: Nouvelle-Aquitaine
- Department: Charente
- Arrondissement: Angoulême
- Canton: Boëme-Échelle
- Intercommunality: Grand Angoulême

Government
  - Mayor (2024–2026): Laurent Dugue
- Area^{1}: 19.44 km^{2} (7.51 sq mi)
- Elevation: 65 m (213 ft)
- Highest elevation: 169 m (554 ft)
- Lowest elevation: 52 m (171 ft)
- Population (2023): 2,105
  - Density: 108.3/km^{2} (280.4/sq mi)
- Time zone: UTC+01:00 (CET)
  - Summer (DST): UTC+02:00 (CEST)
- INSEE/Postal code: 16146 /16410
- ^{1} French Land Register data, which excludes lakes, ponds, glaciers > 1 km^{2} (0.386 sq mi or 247 acres) and river estuaries.

Garat (French pronunciation: [ɡaʁa]) is a commune in the Charente department in southwestern France.

== Population ==
Historical population

Year	Pop.	±% p.a.
1793	846	—
1800	842	−0.07%
1806	777	−1.33%
1821	845	+0.56%
1831	850	+0.06%
1841	925	+0.85%
1846	933	+0.17%
1851	946	+0.28%
1856	912	−0.73%
1861	965	+1.14%
1866	910	−1.17%
1872	859	−0.96%
1876	847	−0.35%
1881	917	+1.60%
1886	895	−0.48%
1891	938	+0.94%
1896	805	−3.01%
1901	720	−2.21%

Year	Pop.	±% p.a.
1906	765	+1.22%
1911	740	−0.66%
1921	664	−1.08%
1926	655	−0.27%
1931	652	−0.09%
1936	655	+0.09%
1946	644	−0.17%
1954	629	−0.29%
1962	630	+0.02%
1968	684	+1.38%
1975	918	+4.29%
1982	1,255	+4.57%
1990	1,484	+2.12%
1999	1,482	−0.01%
2007	1,764	+2.20%
2012	1,937	+1.89%
2017	2,055	+1.19%
2023	2,105	+0.40%

Source: EHESS and INSEE (1968-2023)

== See also ==
- Communes of the Charente department
