= Vouzan =

- Commune
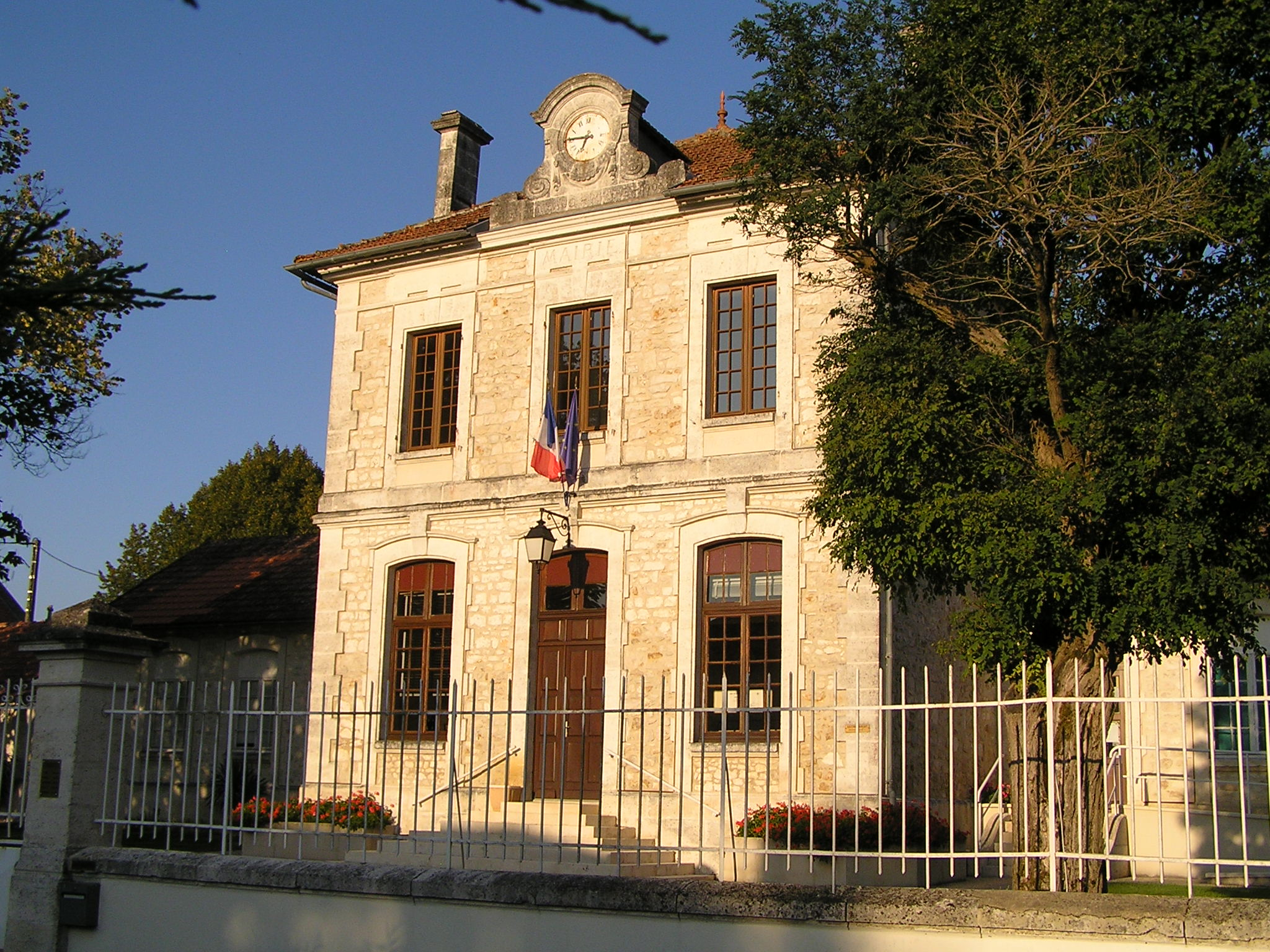
- Town hall
- Location of Vouzan
- Location within France Location within Nouvelle-Aquitaine
- Coordinates: 45°36′11″N 0°21′24″E
- Country: France
- Region: Nouvelle-Aquitaine
- Department: Charente
- Arrondissement: Angoulême
- Canton: Boëme-Échelle
- Intercommunality: Grand Angoulême

Government
  - Mayor (2020–2026): Thierry Hureau
- Area^{1}: 16.27 km^{2} (6.28 sq mi)
- Elevation: 143 m (469 ft)
- Highest elevation: 204 m (669 ft)
- Lowest elevation: 107 m (351 ft)
- Population (2023): 818
  - Density: 50.3/km^{2} (130/sq mi)
- Time zone: UTC+01:00 (CET)
  - Summer (DST): UTC+02:00 (CEST)
- INSEE/Postal code: 16422 /16410
- ^{1} French Land Register data, which excludes lakes, ponds, glaciers > 1 km^{2} (0.386 sq mi or 247 acres) and river estuaries.

Vouzan (French pronunciation: [vuzɑ̃]) is a commune in the Charente department in southwestern France.

== Population ==
Historical population
Year	Pop.	±% p.a.
1968	338	—
1975	347	+0.38%
1982	497	+5.27%
1990	674	+3.88%
1999	678	+0.07%
2007	646	−0.60%
2012	735	+2.62%
2017	780	+1.20%
2023	818	+0.80%
Source: INSEE

== See also ==
- Communes of the Charente department
