= Chadurie =

- Commune
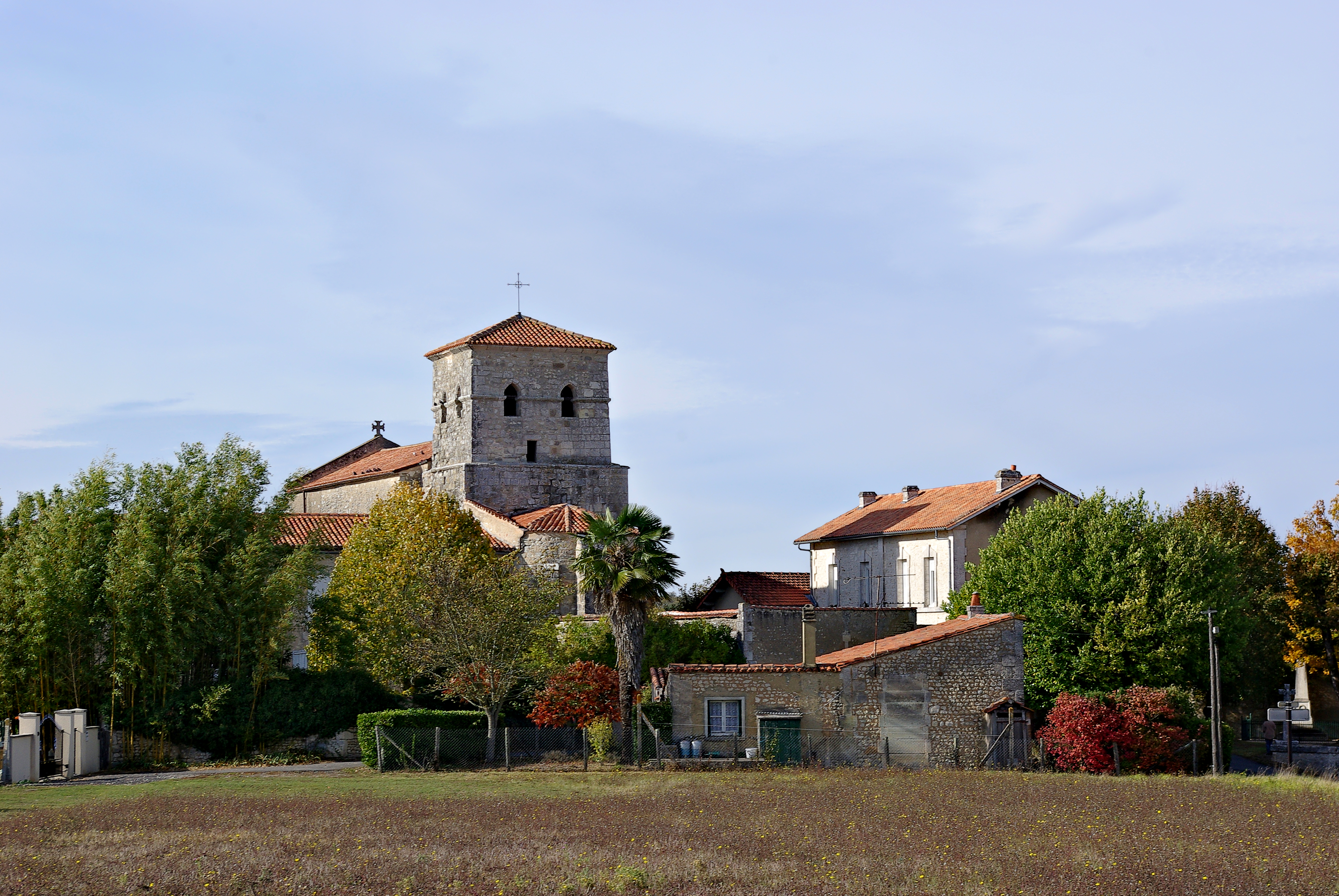
- A general view of Chadurie
- Location of Chadurie
- Location within France Location within Nouvelle-Aquitaine
- Coordinates: 45°29′47″N 0°08′18″E
- Country: France
- Region: Nouvelle-Aquitaine
- Department: Charente
- Arrondissement: Angoulême
- Canton: Tude-et-Lavalette

Government
  - Mayor (2020–2026): Jean-Michel Arvoir
- Area^{1}: 16.42 km^{2} (6.34 sq mi)
- Elevation: 109 m (358 ft)
- Highest elevation: 201 m (659 ft)
- Lowest elevation: 78 m (256 ft)
- Population (2023): 505
  - Density: 30.8/km^{2} (79.7/sq mi)
- Time zone: UTC+01:00 (CET)
  - Summer (DST): UTC+02:00 (CEST)
- INSEE/Postal code: 16072 /16250
- ^{1} French Land Register data, which excludes lakes, ponds, glaciers > 1 km^{2} (0.386 sq mi or 247 acres) and river estuaries.

Chadurie (French pronunciation: [ʃadyʁi]) is a commune in the Charente department in southwestern France.

== Population ==
Historical population
Year	Pop.	±% p.a.
1968	449	—
1975	408	−1.36%
1982	417	+0.31%
1990	474	+1.61%
1999	484	+0.23%
2007	517	+0.83%
2012	514	−0.12%
2017	508	−0.23%
2023	505	−0.10%
Source: INSEE

== See also ==
- Communes of the Charente department
