= Voulgézac =

- Commune
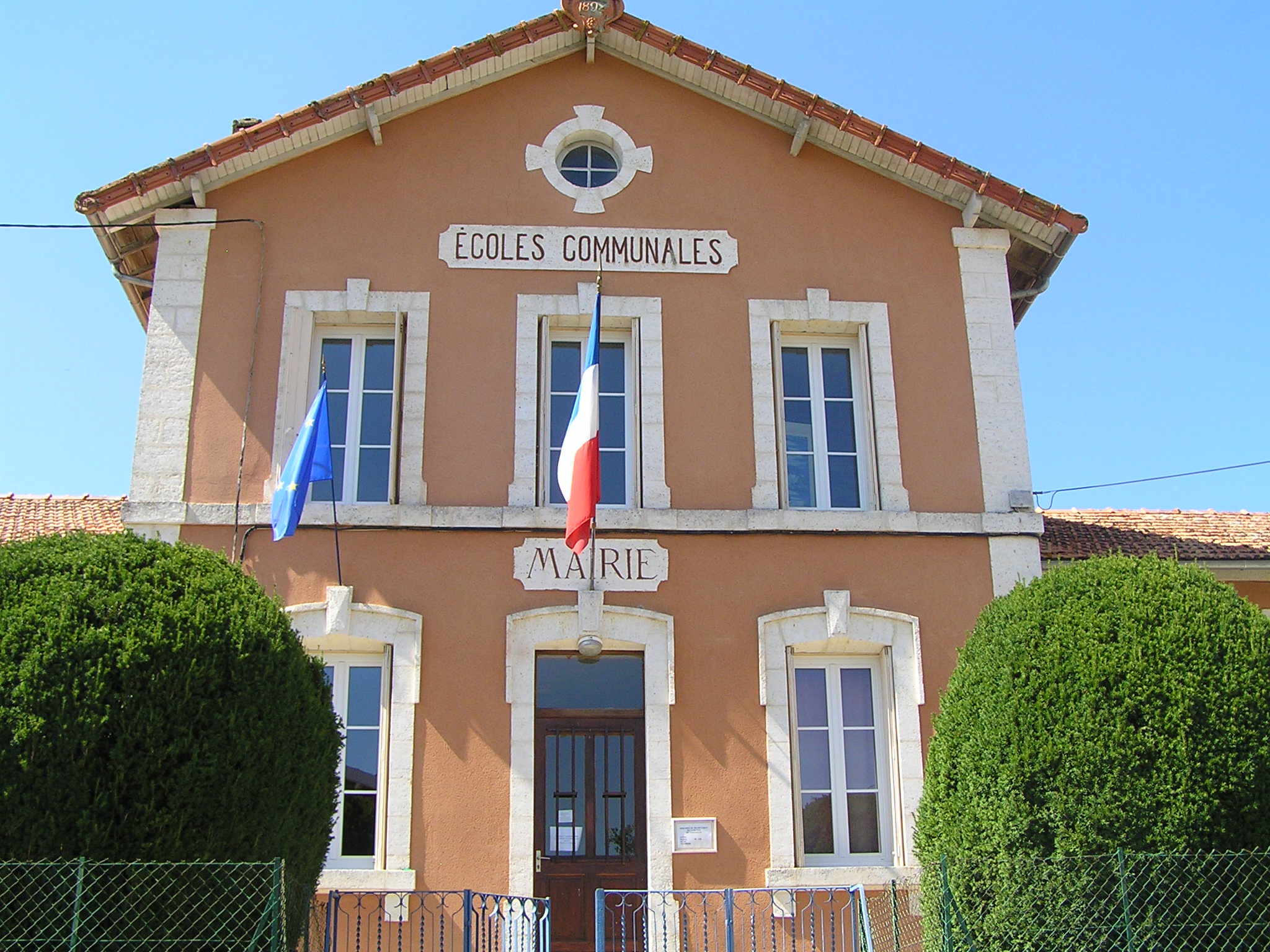
- Town hall
- Location of Voulgézac
- Location within France Location within Nouvelle-Aquitaine
- Coordinates: 45°30′48″N 0°07′16″E
- Country: France
- Region: Nouvelle-Aquitaine
- Department: Charente
- Arrondissement: Angoulême
- Canton: Boëme-Échelle
- Intercommunality: Grand Angoulême

Government
  - Mayor (2020–2026): Thierry Moteau
- Area^{1}: 13.42 km^{2} (5.18 sq mi)
- Elevation: 80 m (260 ft)
- Highest elevation: 192 m (630 ft)
- Lowest elevation: 67 m (220 ft)
- Population (2023): 244
  - Density: 18.2/km^{2} (47.1/sq mi)
- Time zone: UTC+01:00 (CET)
  - Summer (DST): UTC+02:00 (CEST)
- INSEE/Postal code: 16420 /16250
- ^{1} French Land Register data, which excludes lakes, ponds, glaciers > 1 km^{2} (0.386 sq mi or 247 acres) and river estuaries.

Voulgézac (French pronunciation: [vulʒezak]) is a commune in the Charente department in southwestern France.

== Population ==
Historical population
Year	Pop.	±% p.a.
1968	265	—
1975	265	+0.00%
1982	231	−1.94%
1990	289	+2.84%
1999	311	+0.82%
2007	273	−1.62%
2012	263	−0.74%
2017	248	−1.17%
2023	244	−0.27%
Source: INSEE

== See also ==
- Communes of the Charente department
