= Tintignac =

Archaeological site in France

Archeological site of Tintignac-Naves
- Site archéologique de Tintignac-Naves
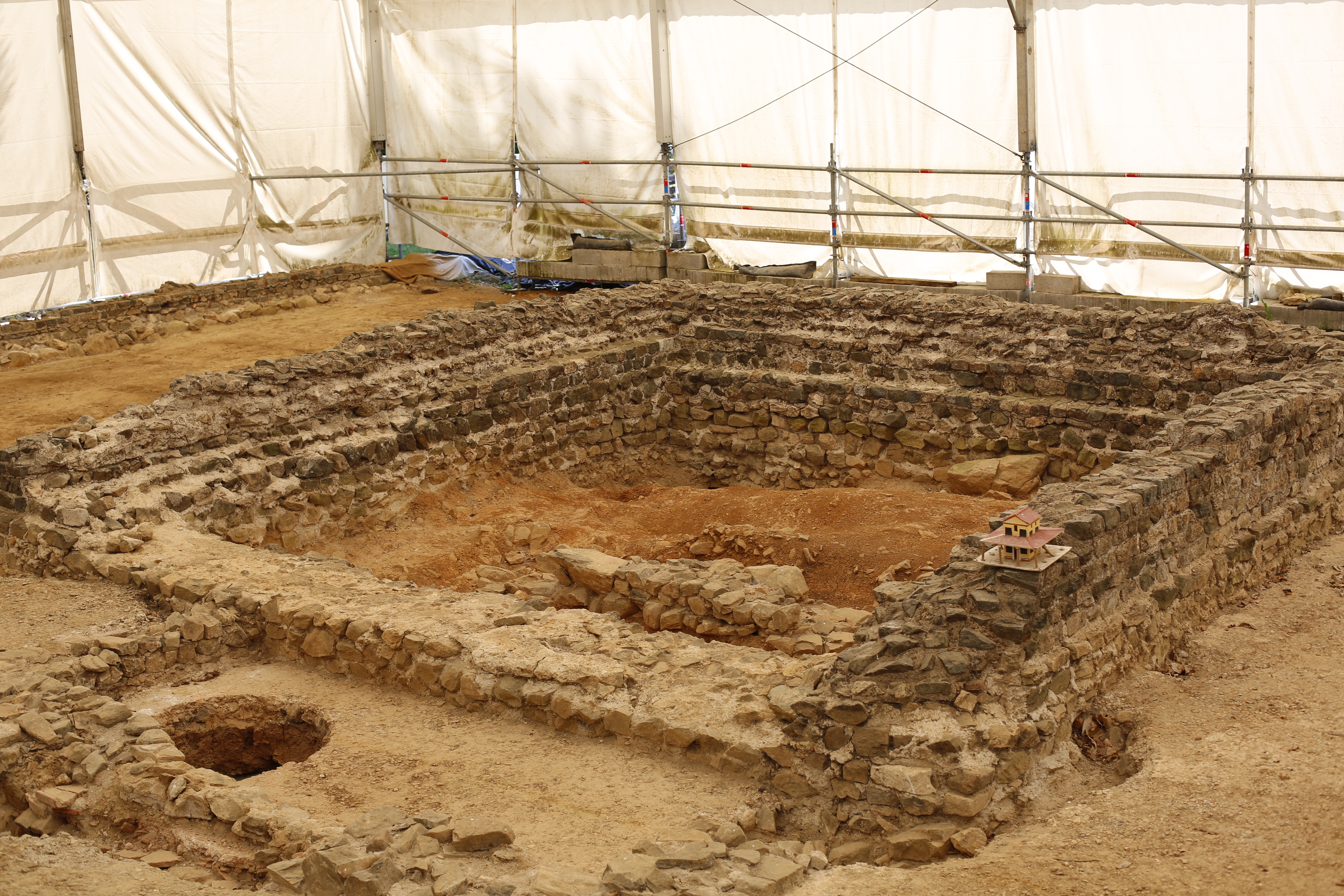
- Remains of a cella

- Location of Tintignac in France
- 45°20′00″N 01°45′28″E
- Type: Sanctuary
- Cultures: Gallic, Roman, Gallo-Roman
- Location: Corrèze
- Region: Nouvelle-Aquitaine

History
- Built: 3rd century BC
- Abandoned: 3rd century AD

Site notes
- Owner: Naves municipality

Tintignac is a hamlet near Naves in the Corrèze region of France. It is primarily known for the archaeological remains of a sanctuary where Gallic and Gallo-Roman artefacts have been found, including seven carnyces (war trumpets) and ornamented helmets. The site is classified on the List of historic monuments of 1840.

== Origins ==
The village has been known since the 12th century, using the Occitan spelling of Tintinhac. It is associated with Arnaut de Tintinhac, a troubadour and lord of Tintinhac who was born at Castle Tintignac, probably as a vassal of the Vicomte de Turenne of the House of La Tour d'Auvergne. Four of his poems have survived.

== Archeological site ==
The Gallic and Gallo-Roman site is located on the plateau of Naves, north of the towns of Naves and Tulle, in the foothills east of Puy l'Aiguille, west of the Peuch Redon summit. Around the sanctuary, researchers have discovered traces of dense occupation and activity.

The site was discovered in the 19th century and is ranked on the list of protected sites after review by the inspector general of historical monuments, Prosper Mérimée and Abel Hugo.

In September 2004, about 500 fragments of iron and bronze objects were discovered in a Gallic pit. The objects included a dozen swords and scabbards, iron spearheads, a shield, ten bronze helmets and an iron bird (a crane or swan is found on some lemovice items), 2 animal heads including a horse, one animal body in connection with the two hind legs, one foreleg, a cauldron, and seven carnyces (a wind instrument of the Iron Age Celts) and including an almost complete War Trumpet. The first such objects found in the context of a Gallic sanctuary. These unique military and religious objects are now being studied by the team led by Christophe Maniquet, chief scientist at the site of Tintignac. In 2009, an aqueduct was discovered, 2 metres high and feeding a well 13 metres deep.

=== Conservation ===
The items were restored by the Materia Viva laboratory in Toulouse and displayed in Tulle before embarking on a series of international exhibitions that began in Bern (Switzerland).

=== Objects ===
Objects found at Tintignac were exhibited at the 2012 exhibition Les Gaulois, une expo renversante (The Gauls, a stunning exhibition).

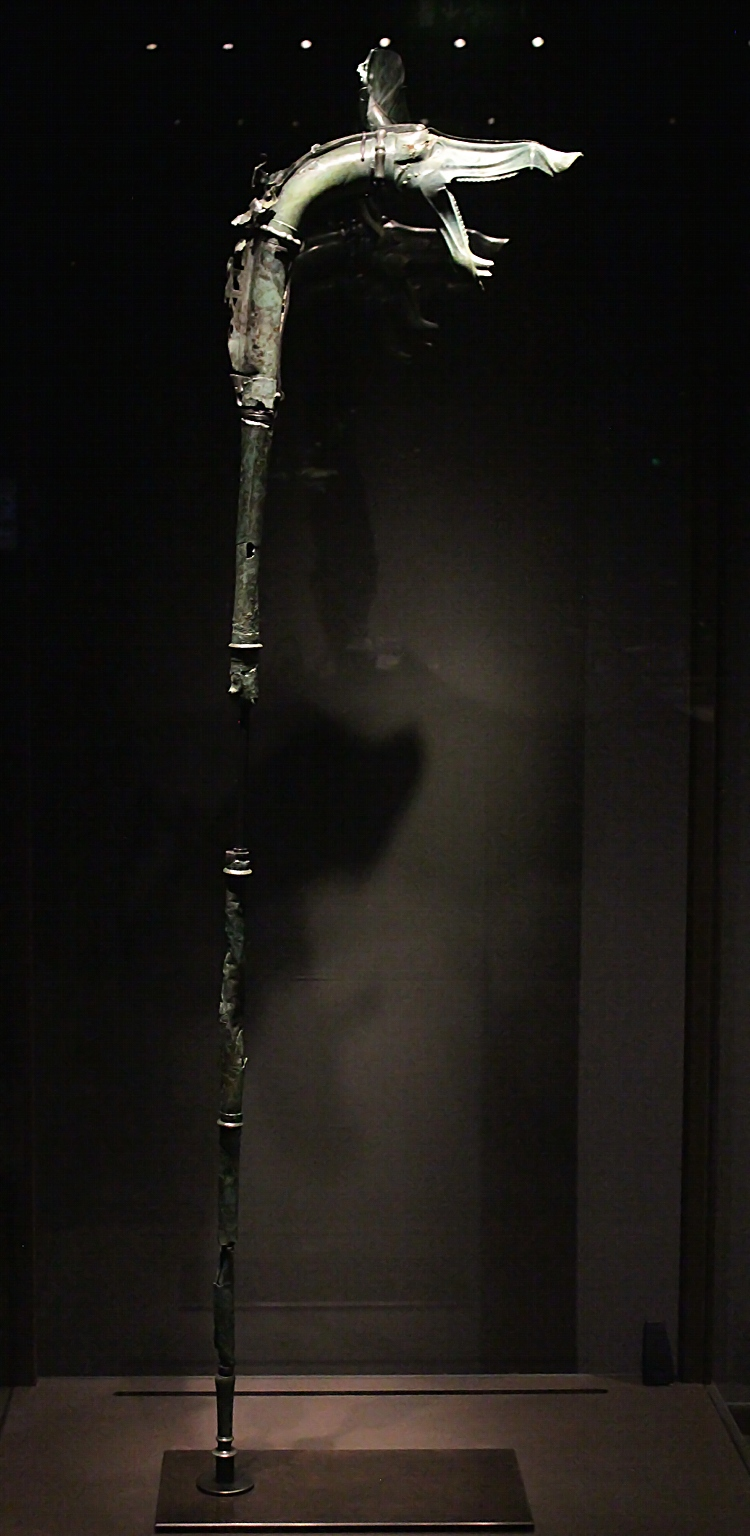
A Carnyx found at Tintignac.

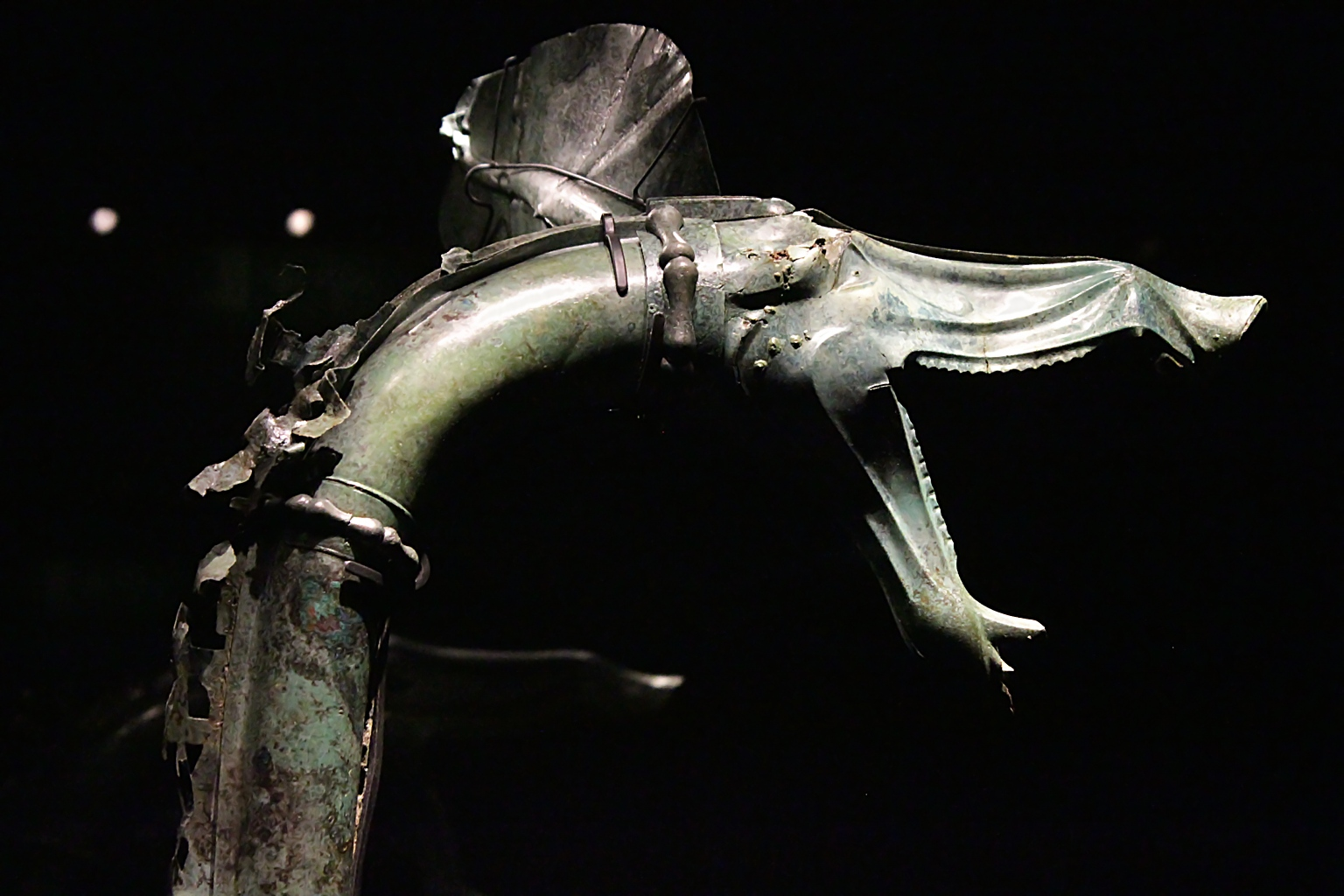
A Carnyx found at Tintignac.

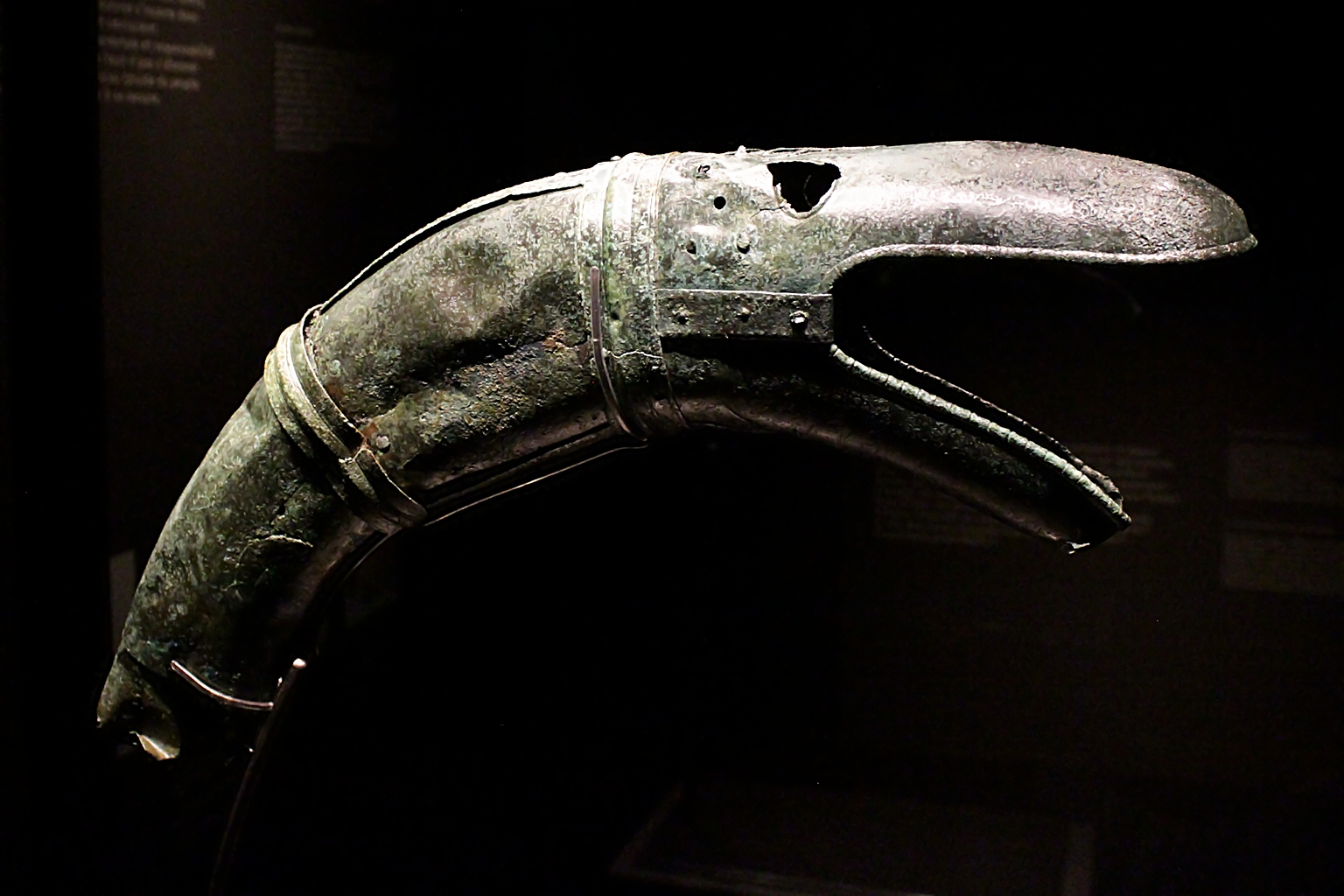
A Carnyx found at Tintignac.

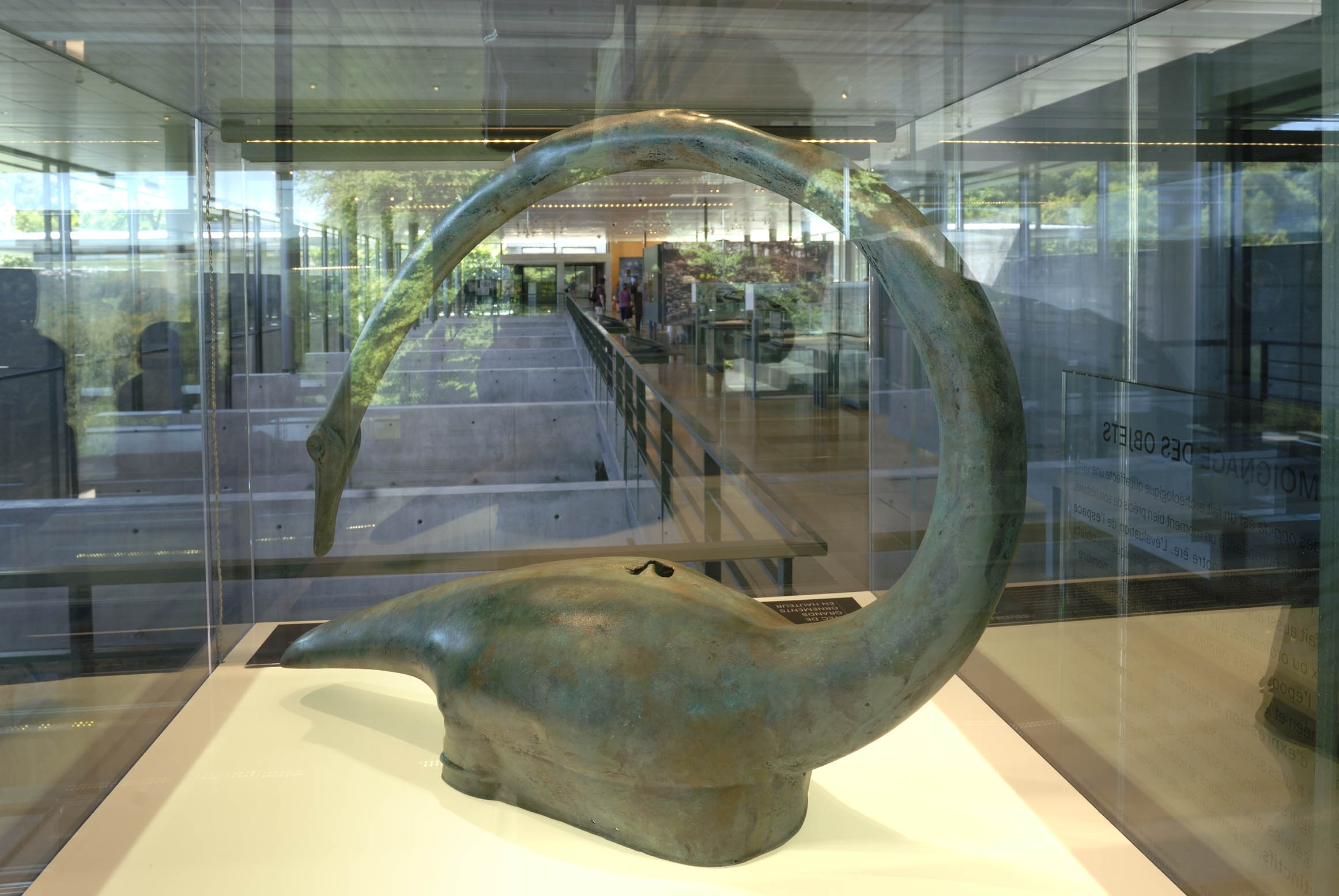
Casque (helmet) in the shape the head of a bird, found at Tintignac.

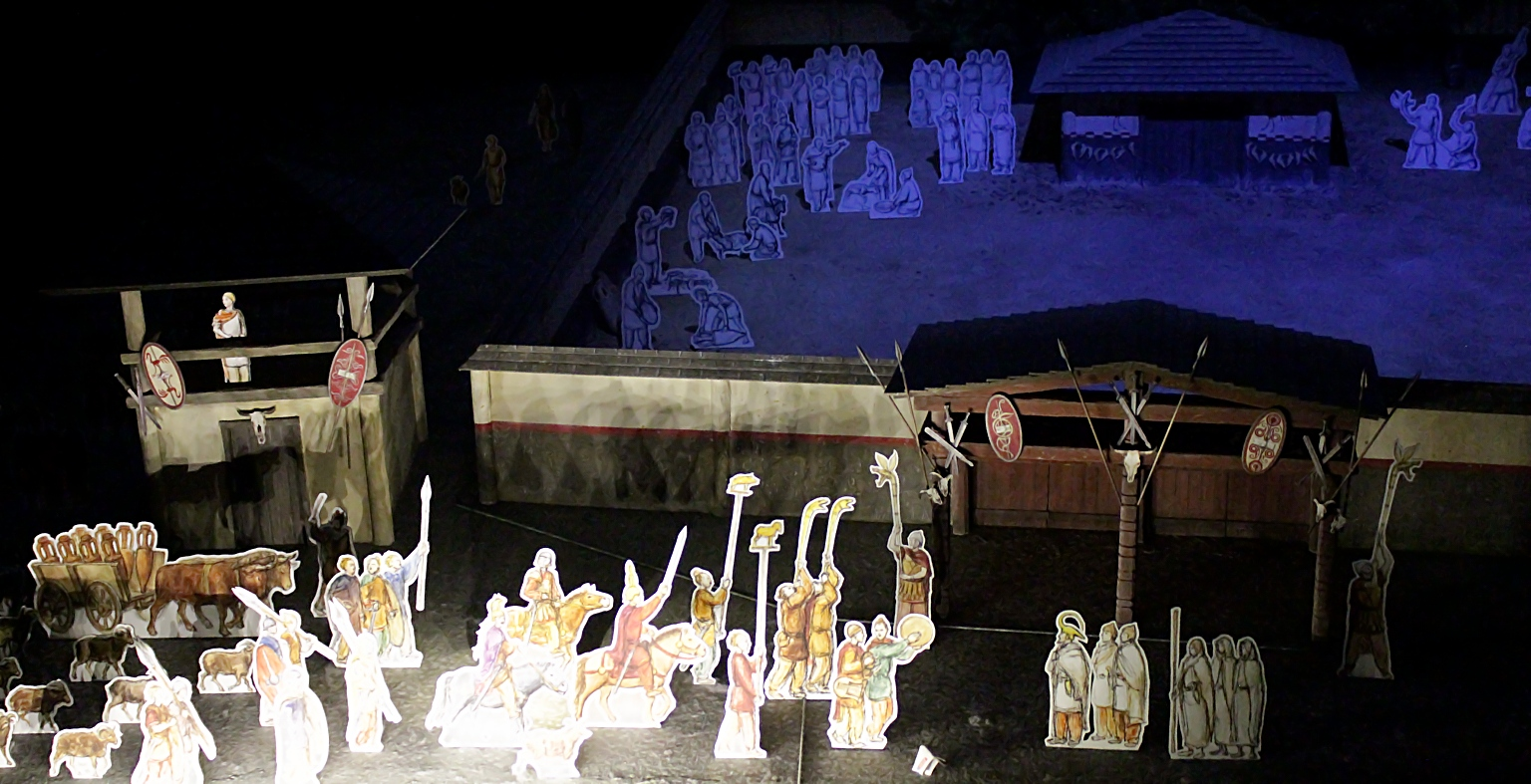
Evocation of a Gallic ceremony in the sanctuary of Tintignac.
