= Gladiator II (soundtrack) =

2024 soundtrack album by Harry Gregson-Williams

Gladiator II (Music from the Motion Picture)

Soundtrack album by Harry Gregson-Williams
- Released: 15 November 2024
- Studio: Abbey Road Studios
- Genre: Film score
- Length: 72:14
- Label: Decca
- Producer: Harry Gregson-Williams

Harry Gregson-Williams film score chronology
Chicken Run: Dawn of the Nugget (Original Motion Picture Soundtrack) (2023)	Gladiator II (Music from the Motion Picture) (2024)

Ridley Scott film score chronology
Napoleon (Soundtrack from the Apple Original Film) (2023)	Gladiator II (Music from the Motion Picture) (2024)

Singles from Gladiator II (Music from the Motion Picture)
- 1. "Strength and Honor" Released: 4 October 2024

Gladiator II (Music from the Motion Picture) is the soundtrack album composed and conducted by Harry Gregson-Williams for the 2024 film Gladiator II by Ridley Scott. It was released on 15 November 2024, the same date as the film's theatrical release in the United Kingdom.

== Background ==
Harry Gregson-Williams was announced as the film's composer on 5 January 2024. Hans Zimmer, who had composed the score to the 2000 film Gladiator, chose not to score its sequel, stating, "I've done that world. And I think I did it well. And all I'd do is set myself up for either trying to repeat myself, which I don't want to do, or getting slaughtered by critics who say you didn't do it as well as you did the first time." Gregson-Williams began his career as an assistant to Zimmer, with Zimmer calling him a "phenomenal composer" and stating that Gladiator II was "in really good hands".

== Production ==
Gregson-Williams wrote 100 minutes of original music for Gladiator II. In addition to conveying the emotional heart of the film, he sought to create a unique and exotic sound that evoked the time period. He discovered Spanish musician Abraham Cupeiro, who specializes in ancient instruments, including the Celtic carnyx, the Roman cornu and the Greek aulos. His score also includes an electric cello motif for Denzel Washington's character, Macrinus, performed by Martin Tillman.

Gregson-Williams employed a 90-piece orchestra and 100-voice choir for his score. The score was recorded at Abbey Road Studios in early 2024.

== Release ==
The soundtrack was released on 15 November 2024, the same date as the film's theatrical release in the United Kingdom. In addition to streaming and digital download, it was also released on CD and LP.

=== Singles ===
The soundtrack album was preceded by a single release, "Strength and Honor", on 4 October 2024.

== Track listing ==
All tracks are written by Harry Gregson-Williams, except where noted.

Gladiator II (Music from the Motion Picture) track listing
No.	Title	Writer(s)	Performer(s)	Length
1.	"Gladiator II Overture"			3:00
2.	"Lucius, Arishat and the Roman Invasion"			8:34
3.	"I'll Wait for You"			5:50
4.	"Ostia"			4:11
5.	"Angry Baboons"			2:00
6.	"Strength and Honor"			3:21
7.	"Acacius Returns"			1:26
8.	"City of Rome"			1:55
9.	"Defiance"			0:55
10.	"I See Him in You"			2:58
11.	"Acacius in the Colosseum"			6:43
12.	"Let the Gods Decide"			4:07
13.	"Macrinus' Plan"			3:33
14.	"I Need You to Do This"			3:51
15.	"Smooth Is the Descent"			4:21
16.	"Now That I Have Found You"			2:43
17.	"Echoes in Eternity"			2:15
18.	"War, Real War"			3:29
19.	"The Dream Is Lost"			2:45
20.	"Now We Are Free"	Lisa Gerrard; Hans Zimmer; Klaus Badelt	Gerrard; Gavin Greenaway; The Lyndhurst Orchestra	4:17
Total length:				72:14

== Charts ==
Chart performance for Gladiator II
Chart (2024)	Peak position
Belgian Albums (Ultratop Flanders)	85
Belgian Albums (Ultratop Wallonia)	161
UK Album Downloads (Official Charts)	31
UK Soundtrack Albums (Official Charts)	1

== Release history ==
Release history and formats for Gladiator II (Music from the Motion Picture)
Region	Date	Format(s)	Label(s)	Ref.
Various	15 November 2024	Digital download; streaming; CD; LP	Decca Records	
