= Carnyx =

Ancient musical instrument

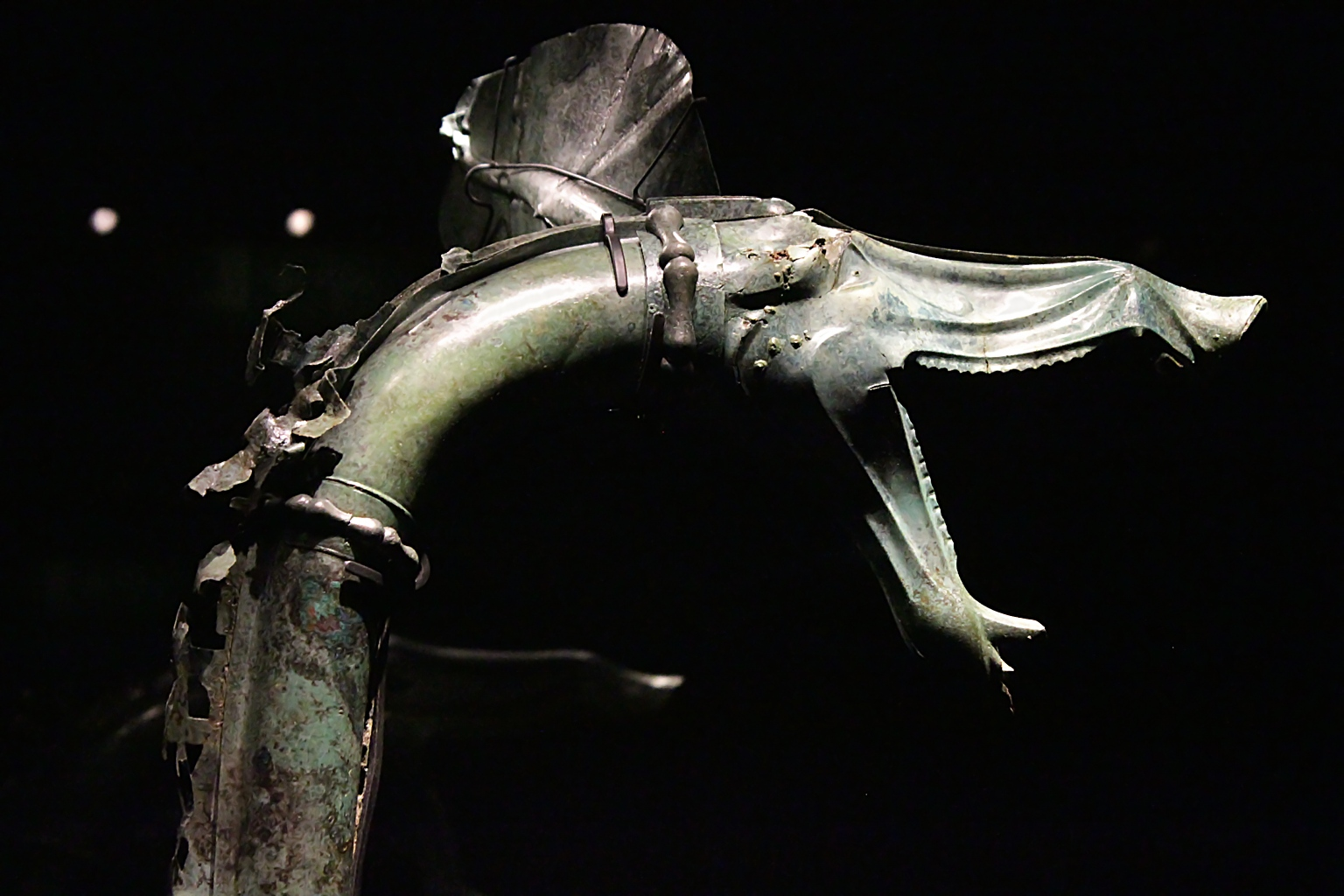
Carnyx from the Tintignac group

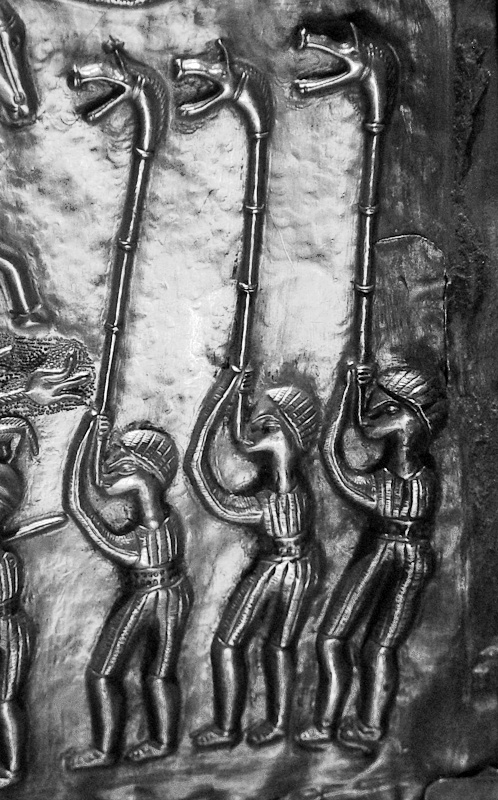
Three carnyx players depicted on plate E of the Gundestrup cauldron

The carnyx (pl.: carnyces; /kɑːnɪks/, KAR-nicks) is a wind instrument that was common in Celtic cultures during the Iron Age, between c. 200 BC and c. 200 AD. It is a type of trumpet made of bronze with an elongated S shape, held so that the long straight central portion was vertical and the short mouthpiece end section and the much wider bell were horizontal in opposed directions. The bell was styled in the shape of the head of an open-mouthed boar or other animal.

The Celts used the carnyx in warfare, probably to incite troops to battle and to intimidate opponents, as Polybius recounts. The instrument's significant height—typically around 1.8 metres (6 feet), standing as tall as its player—allowed it to be heard over the heads of the participants in battles or ceremonies. The carnyx was not only used by the Celts but also by the Dacians in modern Romania, and depictions have even been found on a Buddhist sculpture in India, attesting to the far-flung connections of the Iron Age world.

== Etymology ==
The word carnyx is derived from the Gaulish root carn- or cern-, meaning 'antler' or 'horn', and the same root of the name of the god Cernunnos. The Greek form karnon (κάρνον) or karnyx (κάρνυξ) is preserved in late lexicographers such as Hesychius, who defined it as a trumpet used by the Galatians.

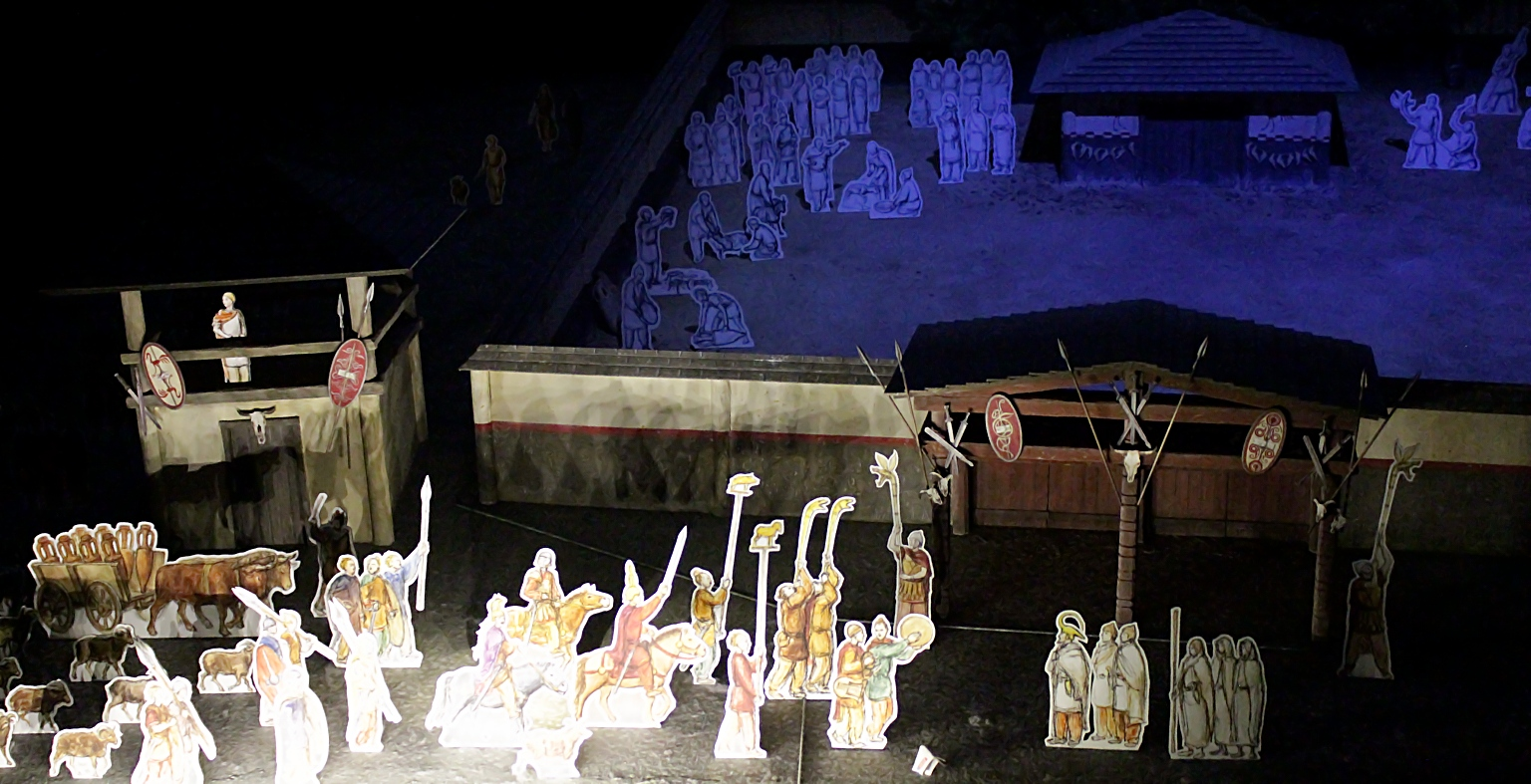
Evocation of a Gallic ceremony in the sanctuary of Tintignac, La Tène culture

== Archaeology ==
=== Symbolism ===
In Iron Age Britain, animal symbolism deliberately conveys aggression and ferocity, with examples including a boar on the Witham Shield, the snouted Deskford carnyx in Scotland and the dragon pair sword scabbard from the River Thames.

There is evidence to suggest that the carnyx would be held by a chieftain, as shown by a potential Gaulish king Bituitos figure. The design of the carnyx was likely inspired by the Etruscan lituus, a similarly curved trumpet, as part of the broader incorporation of Mediterranean imagery into Iron Age northern Europe.

=== Tintignac ===
In 2004, archaeologists discovered a first-century-BC Gallic pit at Tintignac in Corrèze, France (45.3333°N 1.7582°E). The deposit contained more than 500 fragments of metal objects, including seven carnyces, one of which was nearly complete. Prior to this discovery, fragments of only five carnyces had been found, in modern-day Scotland, France, Germany, Romania, and Switzerland. Six of the carnyces had boar's heads, while the seventh appears to be a serpent-like monster. They appear to represent a ritual deposit dating to soon after the Roman conquest of Gaul. The Tintignac finds enabled some fragments found in northern Italy decades before to be identified in 2012 as coming from a carnyx.

=== Tattershall Ferry, Lincolnshire ===
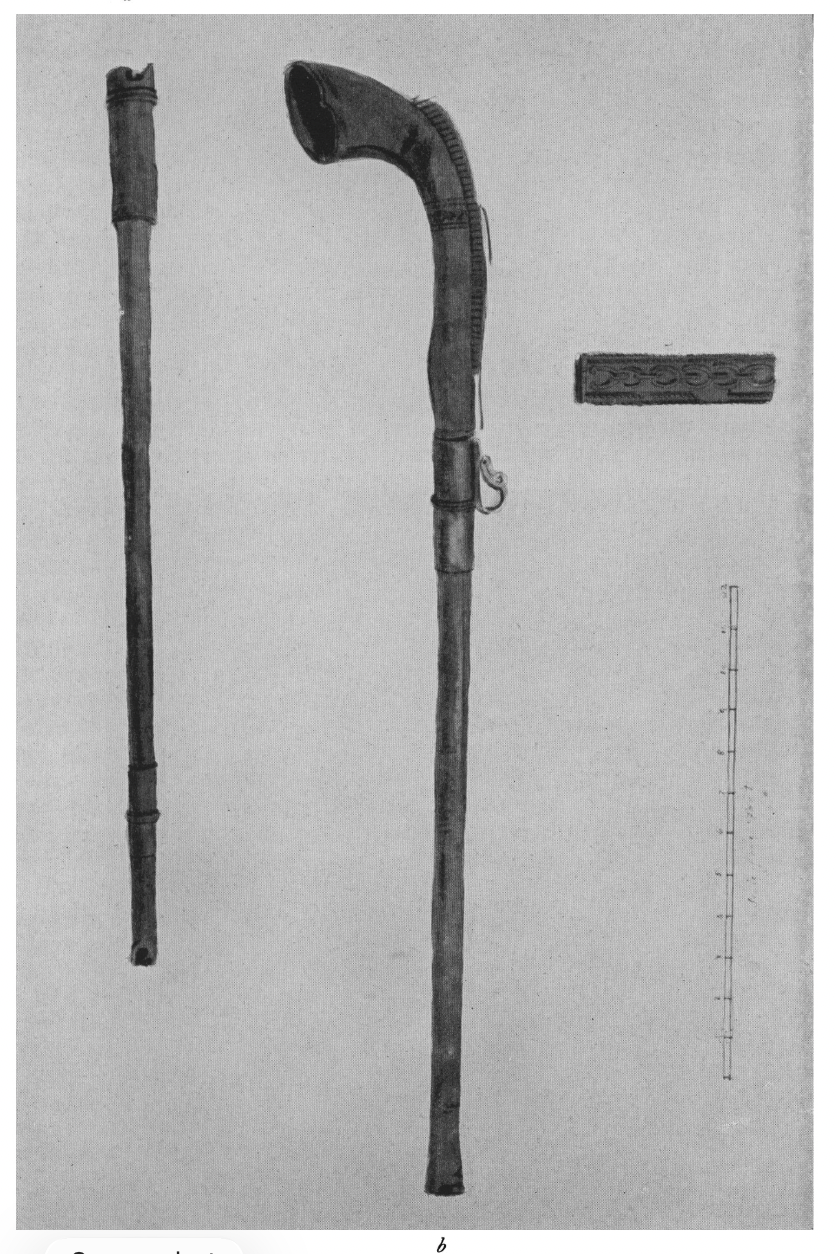
Carnyx from Tattershall Ferry. The animal-head and the mouthpiece are missing. When complete the length overall would have been about 50 inches (130 cm)

The first example found in Britain was dredged from the River Witham at Tattershall Ferry (53.08981°N 0.21462°W), Lincolnshire, in 1768. It is interpreted as a votive offering consigned into the river during the Iron Age. Made from hammered sheets of bronze fastened together with tin solder, it was destroyed during an attempt to analyse the composition of the metal used to make it.

=== Deskford, Banffshire ===
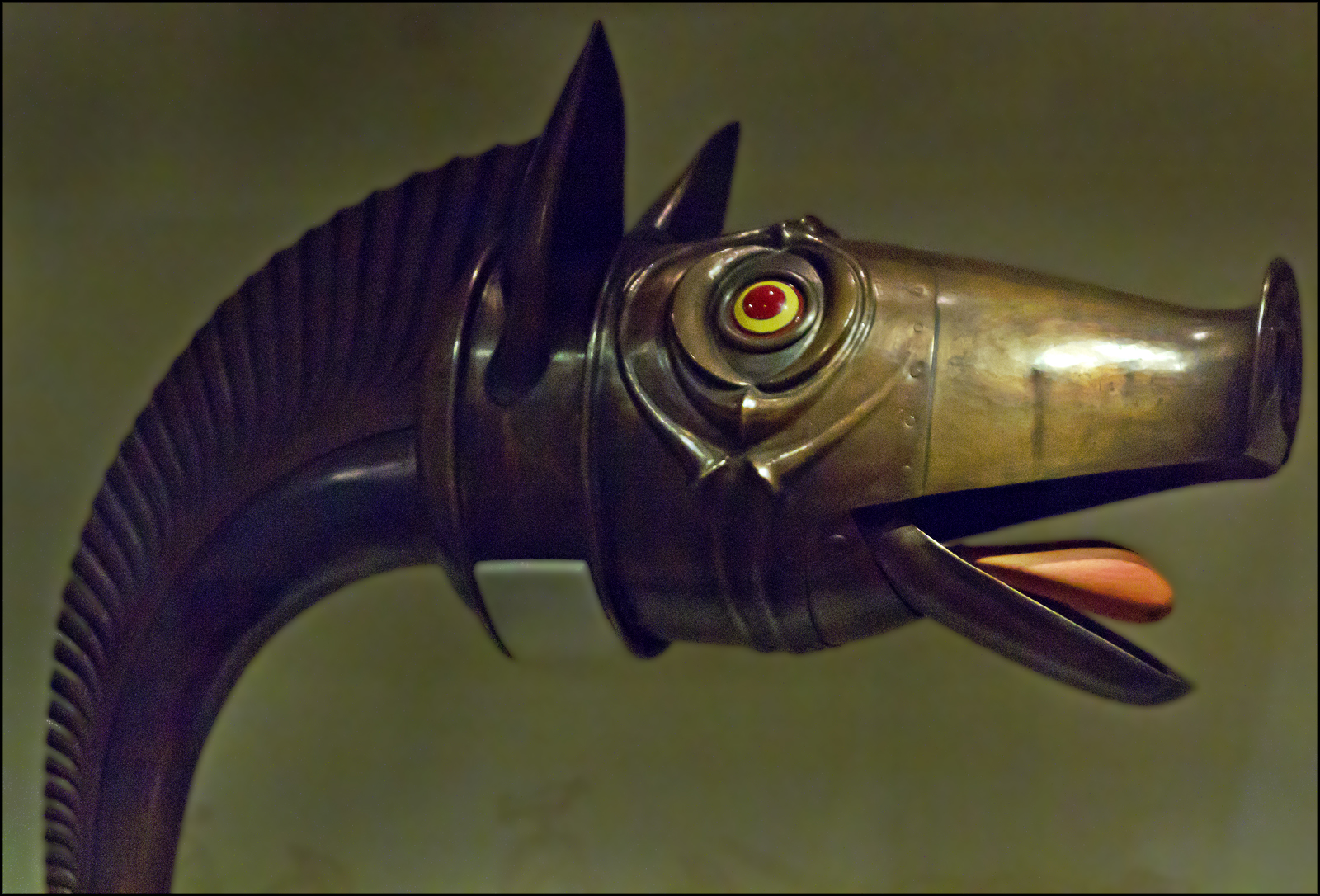
Deskford carnyx reconstruction

The next example found in Britain is the Deskford Carnyx, discovered at the farm of Leitchestown (57.6585°N 2.8041°W), Deskford, Banffshire, Scotland, in 1816. Seemingly, it too was placed as a ritual deposit in a peat bog. Only the boar's-head bell survives. It was donated to Banff Museum, and is now on loan from Aberdeenshire Museums Service to the Museum of Scotland. The location and age of the Deskford Carnyx in the Pictish heartland suggests the instrument may have had a ceremonial use and was not used only in warfare. Before 2004 this was the best surviving example, and generally copied in earlier reconstructions.

The Deskford find was made almost entirely of brass, a metal used almost exclusively by the Romans after their conquest of Southern Britannia and strictly controlled by them, so just as with the vast majority of Iron Age and Roman-era Celtic brass found in Britain, the carnyx may have been made "with some care" from recycled metal. Based in part on the metallurgy, the Museum of Scotland give a date of 80–250 CE for its construction, noting that it was a locally-produced piece, "a specifically Scottish variant" distinct in design from known continental carnyces and that its "decoration is typical of metalwork in northeast Scotland at the time, where there was a flourishing tradition of fine bronze-working". Although metallurgy and style suggest manufacture local to the discovery, Vincent Megaw suggests that the pattern is characteristic also of items produced in Belgium in about 50 CE.

=== Norfolk ===
In 2025 a collection of Iron Age military hardware was unearthed in west Norfolk, within the former territory of the Iceni tribe. The items were probably buried within the first century AD. The finds included a bronze carnyx, a bronze war standard in the shape of a boar's head, and five shield bosses. The carnyx requires extensive conservation but is exceptionally complete: one conservator described it as "the most complete carnyx ever found". It is unusual or unique in having the ears of the animal head intact.

=== Roman archaeology ===
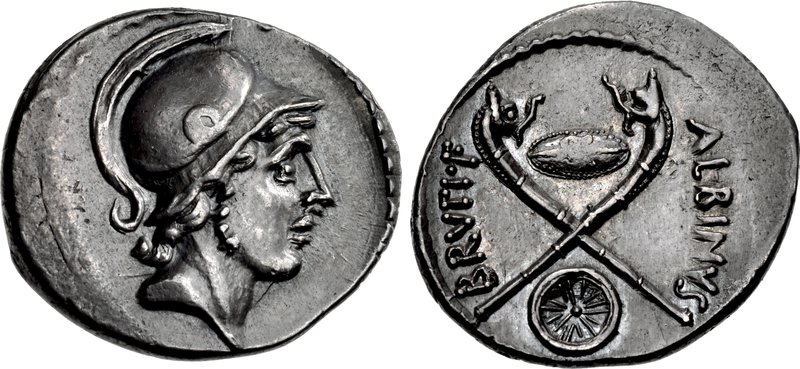
Silver denarius of Decimus Junius Brutus Albinus depicting carnyces from the Gallic Wars on the reverse, 48 BCE

Roman-struck coins suggest that a war trumpet was used by the Celts, which they called a carnyx. These celtic trumpets are dissimilar to Roman trumpets that are not described as having a "monster headed extremity". The carnyx appears on Celtic coinage as a symbol of pride, while on Roman coins, it was used as a sign of Roman military triumph over the Gauls. The Celtic or Gaulic carnyx was used by the Celts in a similar way to how a standard functioned for the Romans and there is an example of a Dragon-headed carnyx in the base of Trajan's Column. The carnyx has been described as identical to a Dacian trumpet. There is a clear similarity between Celtic carnyx and the Dacian La Tène dragon standard and jewellery with dragons and serpents. A dragon-headed carnyx also appears to be held by a Gaulic woman on the breastplate of Augustus.

=== Others ===
- The carnyx also appears on the side of the Gundestrup cauldron.
- A small bronze boar-head trumpet, resembling a carnyx but much smaller, dating from the Iron Age, was found in Suffolk, England in 2016.

== Literature ==
The name is known from textual sources, carnyces are reported from the Celtic attack on the Delphi in 279 BC, as well as from Julius Caesar's campaign in Gaul and the Claudian invasion of Britannia in 43 CE by Aulus Plautius. The Greek historian Polybius depicted the terrifying clamor in his description of the 225 BC Battle of Telamon: "For there were innumerable horn-blowers and trumpeters, and, as the whole army were shouting their war-cries at the same time, there was such a tumult of sound that it seemed that not only the trumpets and the soldiers but all the country round had got a voice and caught up the cry." Around 60—30 BC, Diodorus Siculus wrote:

Their trumpets again are of a peculiar barbarian kind; they blow into them and produce a harsh sound which suits the tumult of war.

== Objects from Tintignac ==
Objects found at Tintignac were exhibited at the 2012 exhibition "Les Gaulois, une expo renversante" ("The Gauls, a stunning exhibition").

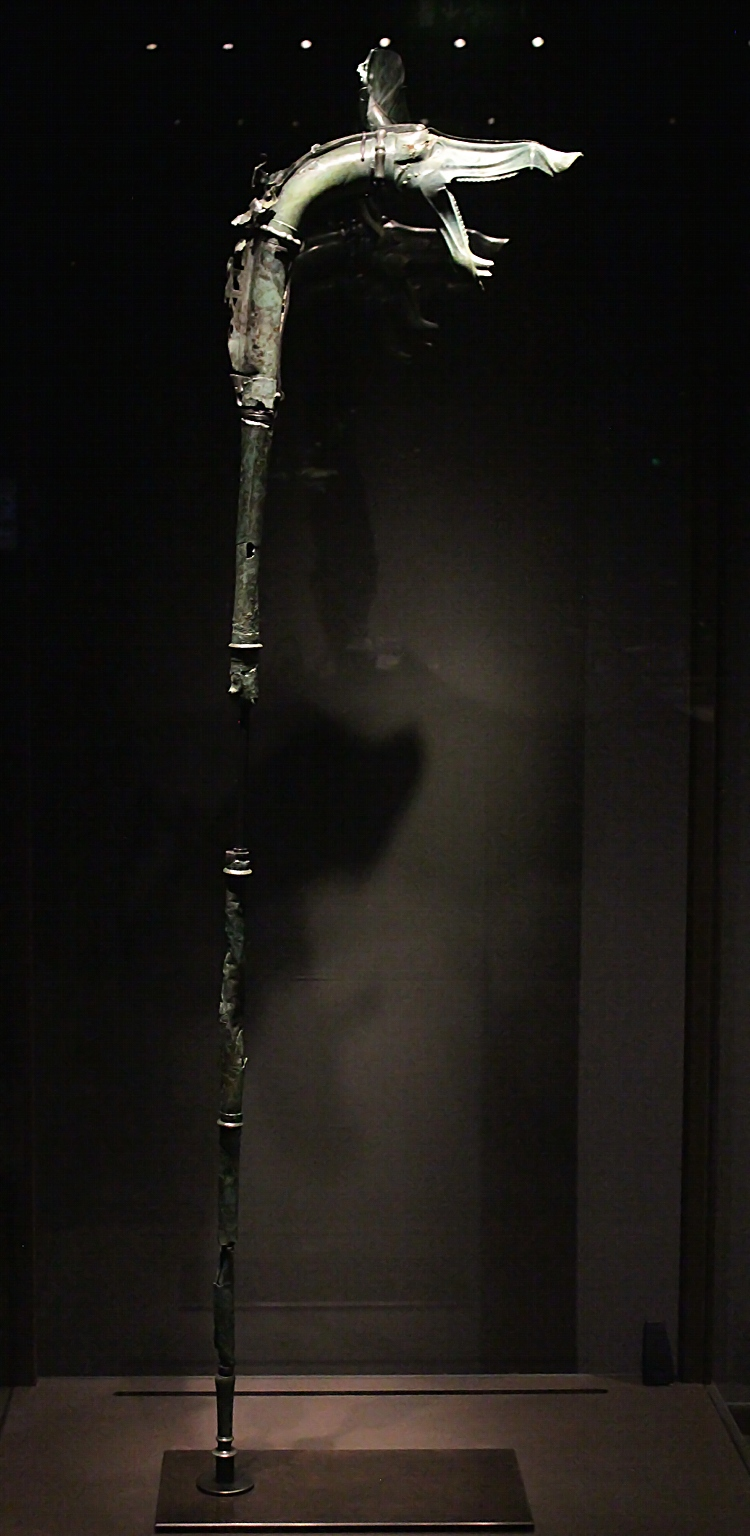
The carnyx of Tintignac, discovered in Corrèze, France

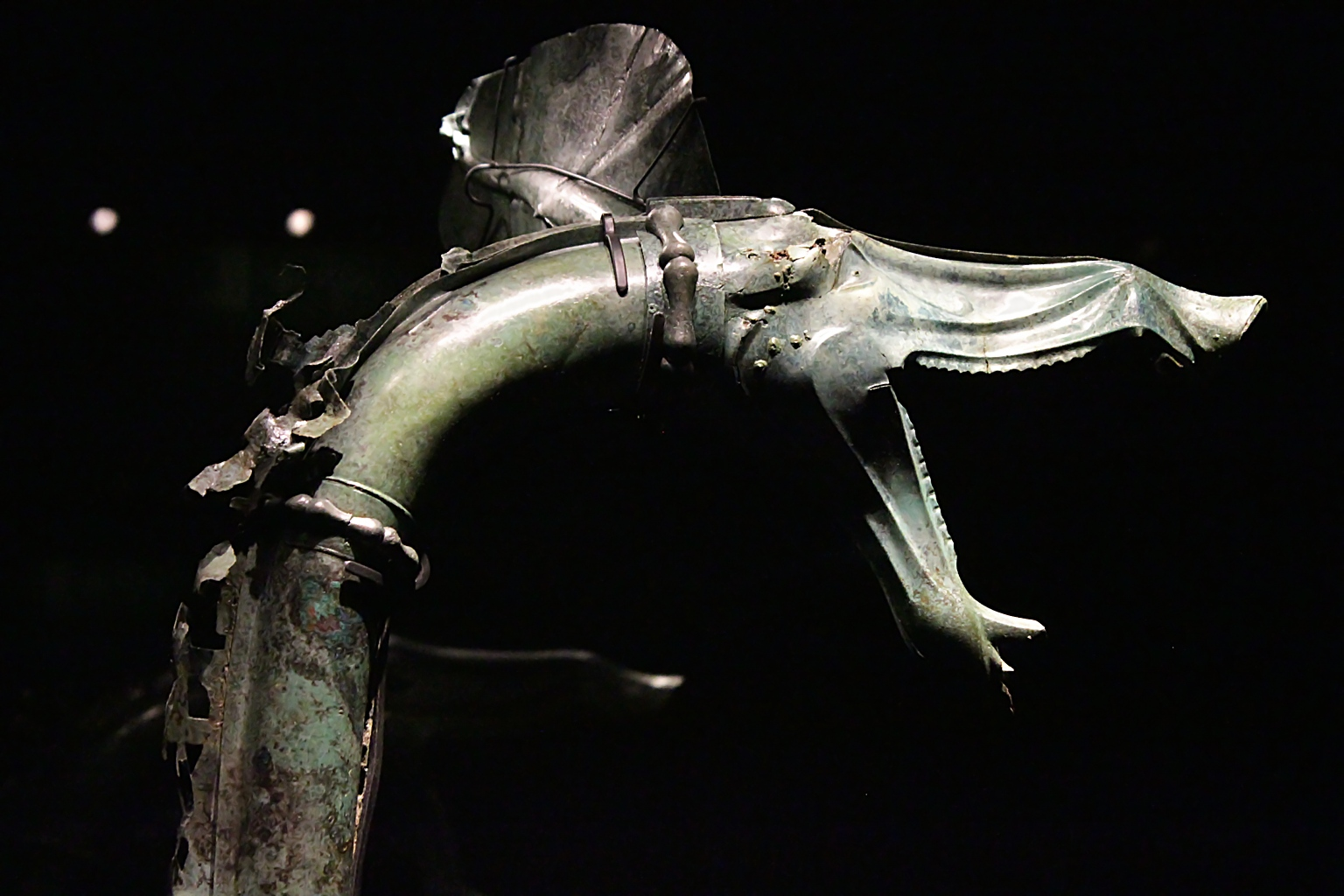
A carnyx found at Tintignac

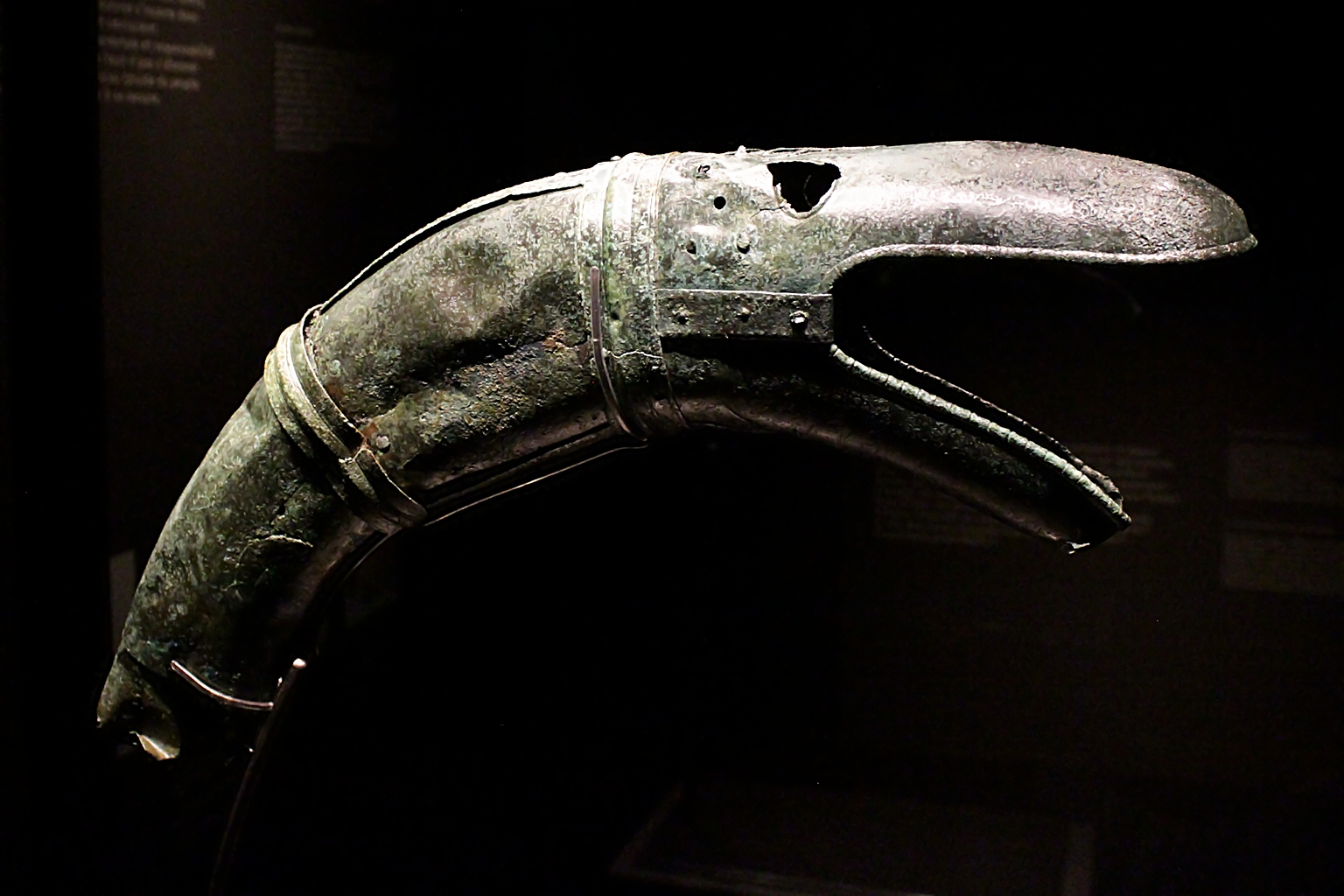
A carnyx found at Tintignac

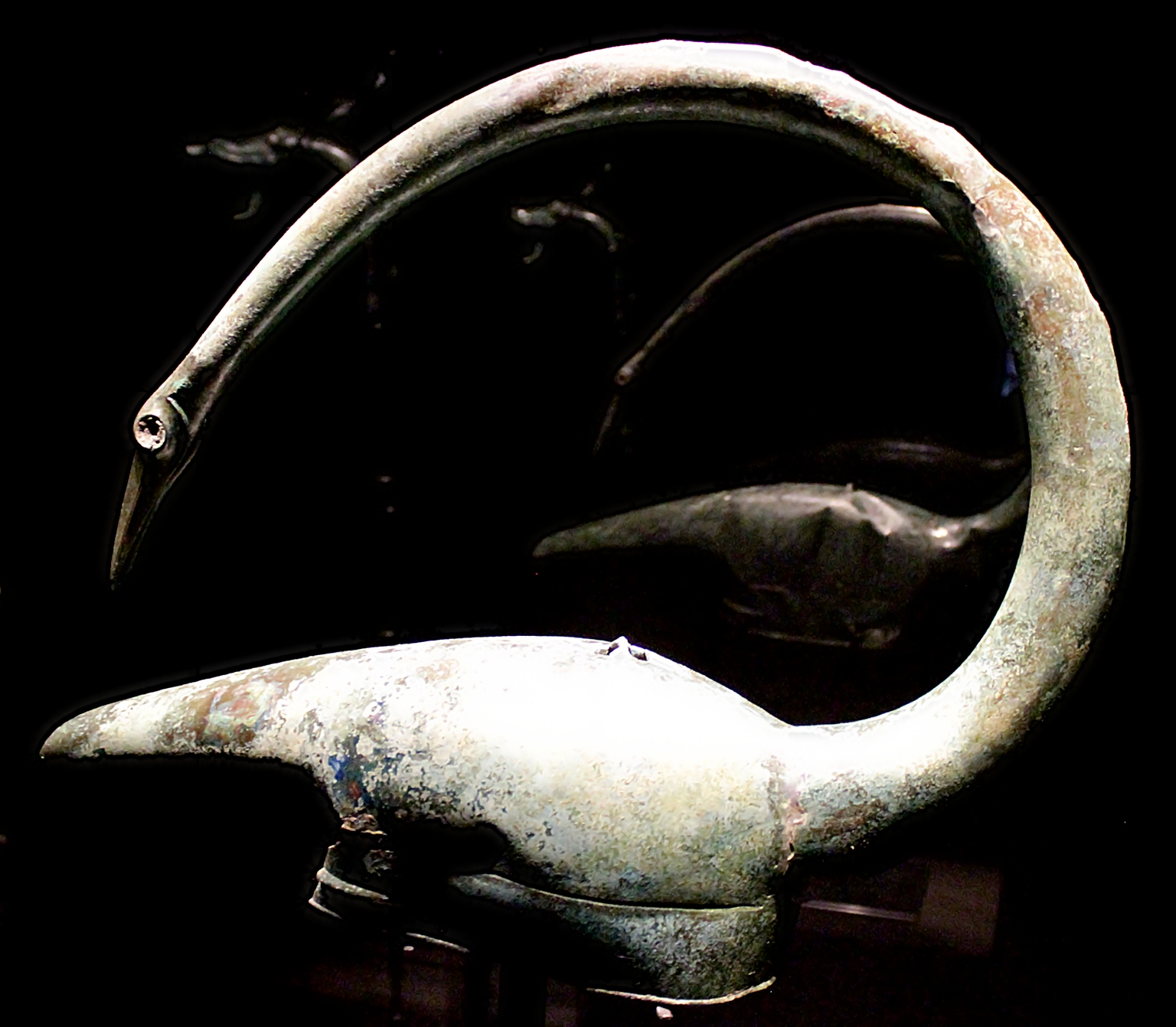
A helmet in the shape of the head of a bird, found at Tintignac

=== Other objects ===
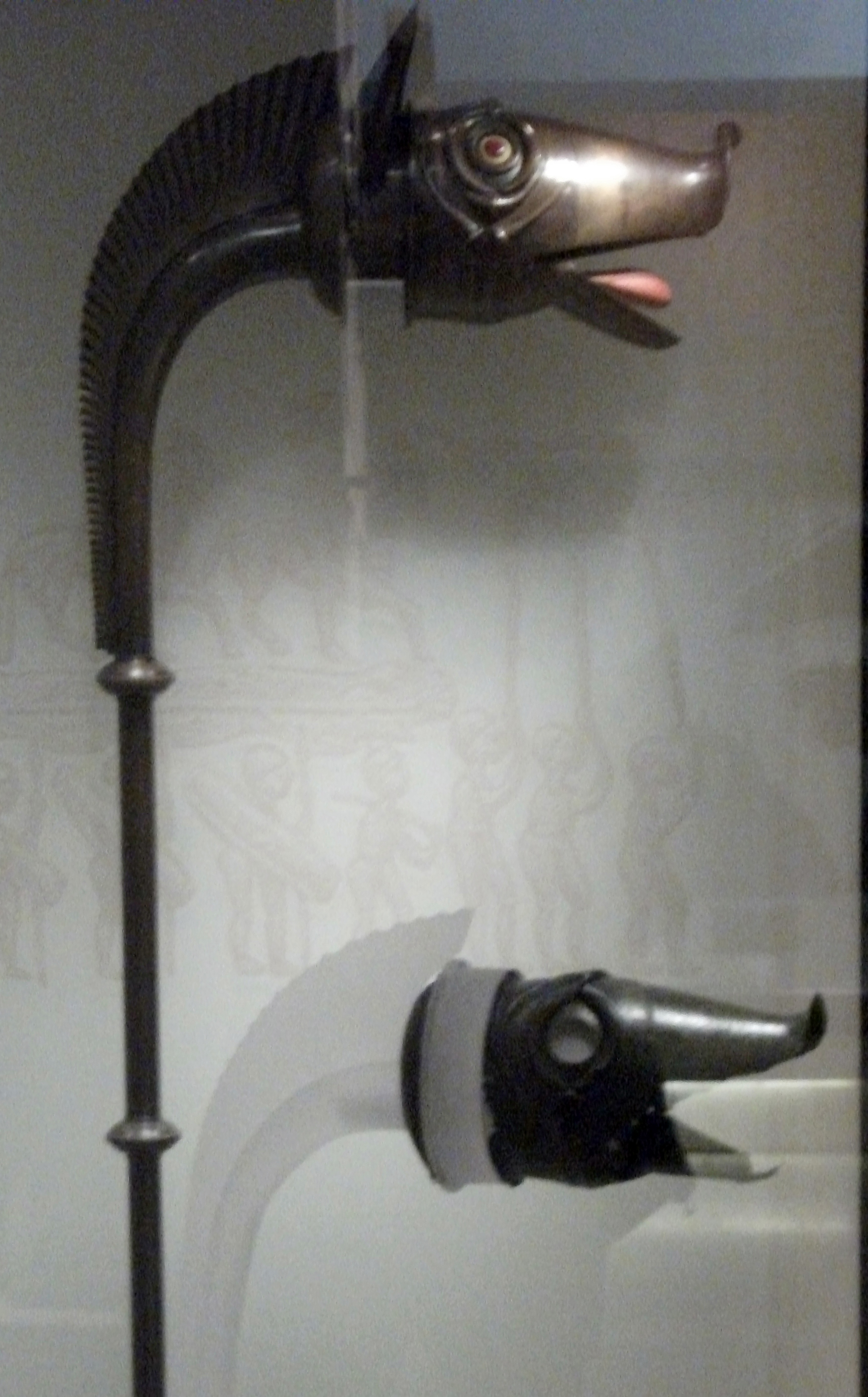
The Leichestown Deskford carnyx and reconstruction, Museum of Scotland

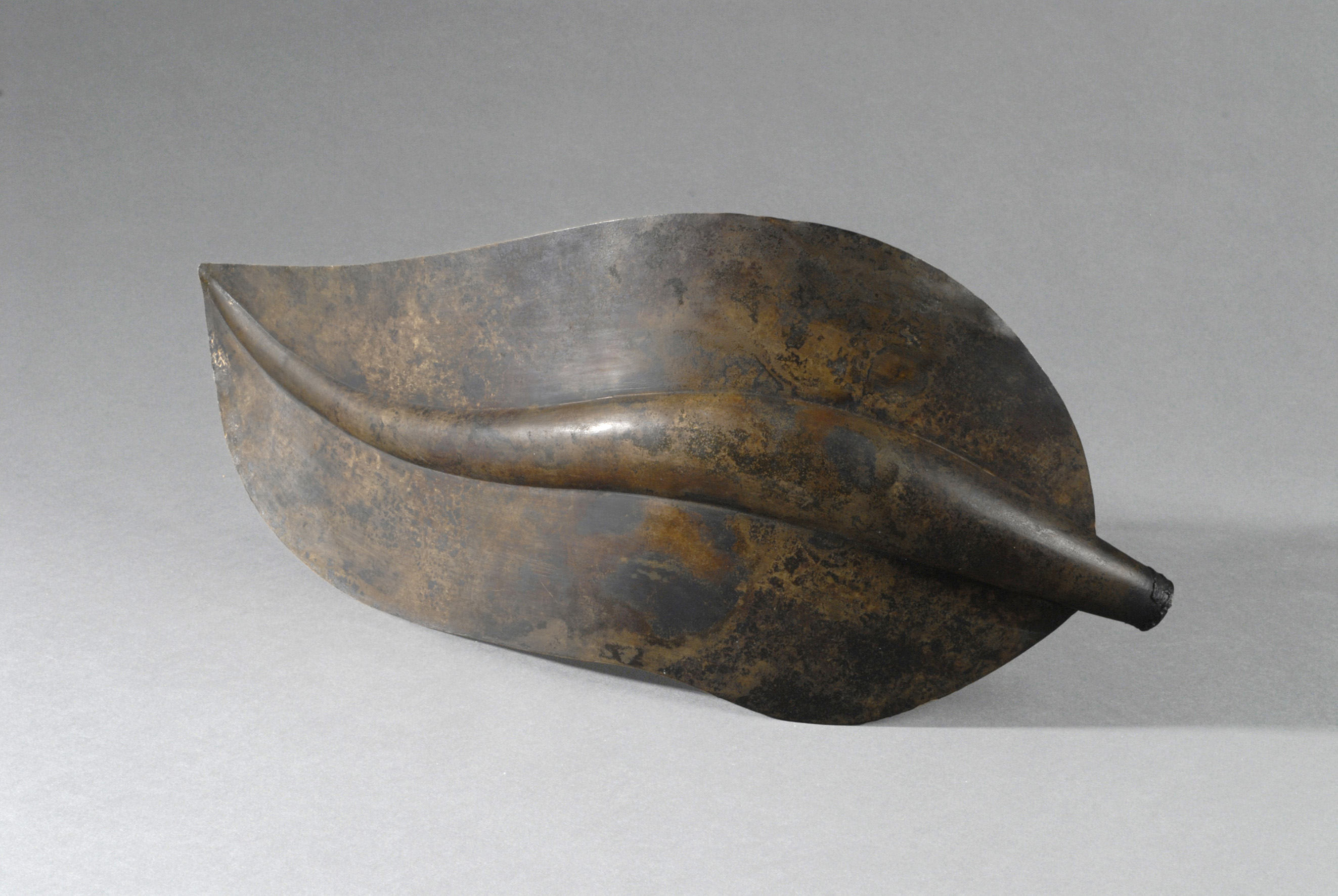
Piece from a carnyx, Switzerland

== Modern reconstructions ==
"Carnyx Trumpet Call"
Recording of a reconstruction of the Deskford carnyx

The reconstruction of the Deskford Carnyx was initiated by John Purser and commenced in 1991, funded jointly by the Glenfiddich Living Scotland award and the National Museums of Scotland. In addition to John Purser as musicologist, the team consisted of the archaeologist Fraser Hunter, silversmith John Creed, and trombonist John Kenny. The reconstructed Deskford Carnyx was unveiled at the National Museum of Scotland in April 1993.

In 1993, Kenny became the first person known to play the carnyx in 2,000 years and has since lectured and performed on the instrument internationally, in the concert hall, on radio, television, and film. There are numerous compositions for the carnyx, and it is featured on seven CDs. On 15 March 2003, he performed solo to an audience of 65,000 in the Stade De France in Paris.

A French research team led by archaeologist Christophe Maniquet reconstructed the Tintignac carnyx, with the replica made by coppersmith Jean Boisserie. Acoustic analysis revealed that the instrument's resonance frequencies were inharmonic, with the closest modern approximation being a (harmonic) alto saxhorn. Skilled players can produce a range of overtones by modulating air flow and lip tension.

On 15 June 2017, "The Music of the Forest", a specially commissioned work by Lakeland composer Christopher Gibbs featuring a reconstructed carnyx, received its world premiere at Slaidburn Village Hall. The four-part song cycle evokes the landscape and history of the Forest of Bowland and was performed by the Renaissance Singers of Blackburn Cathedral under the direction of Samuel Hudson. The carnyx was played by John Kenny.

In 2024, the Football Association of Wales commissioned a reconstructed carnyx from a Belgian metalsmith to incorporate into pre-match performances as "another way of expressing our [Welsh] identity to the world". It was first played before a UEFA Nations League fixture versus Iceland on 19 November 2024 by a trumpet player from the Barry Horns fans' brass band.

== Gallery of reconstructions and reenactors ==
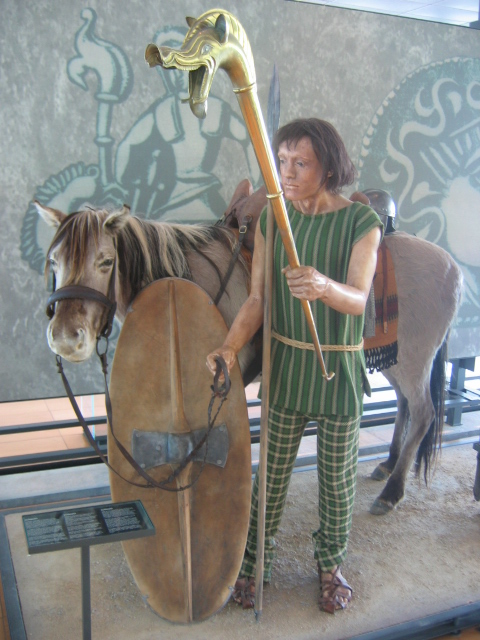
French museum display

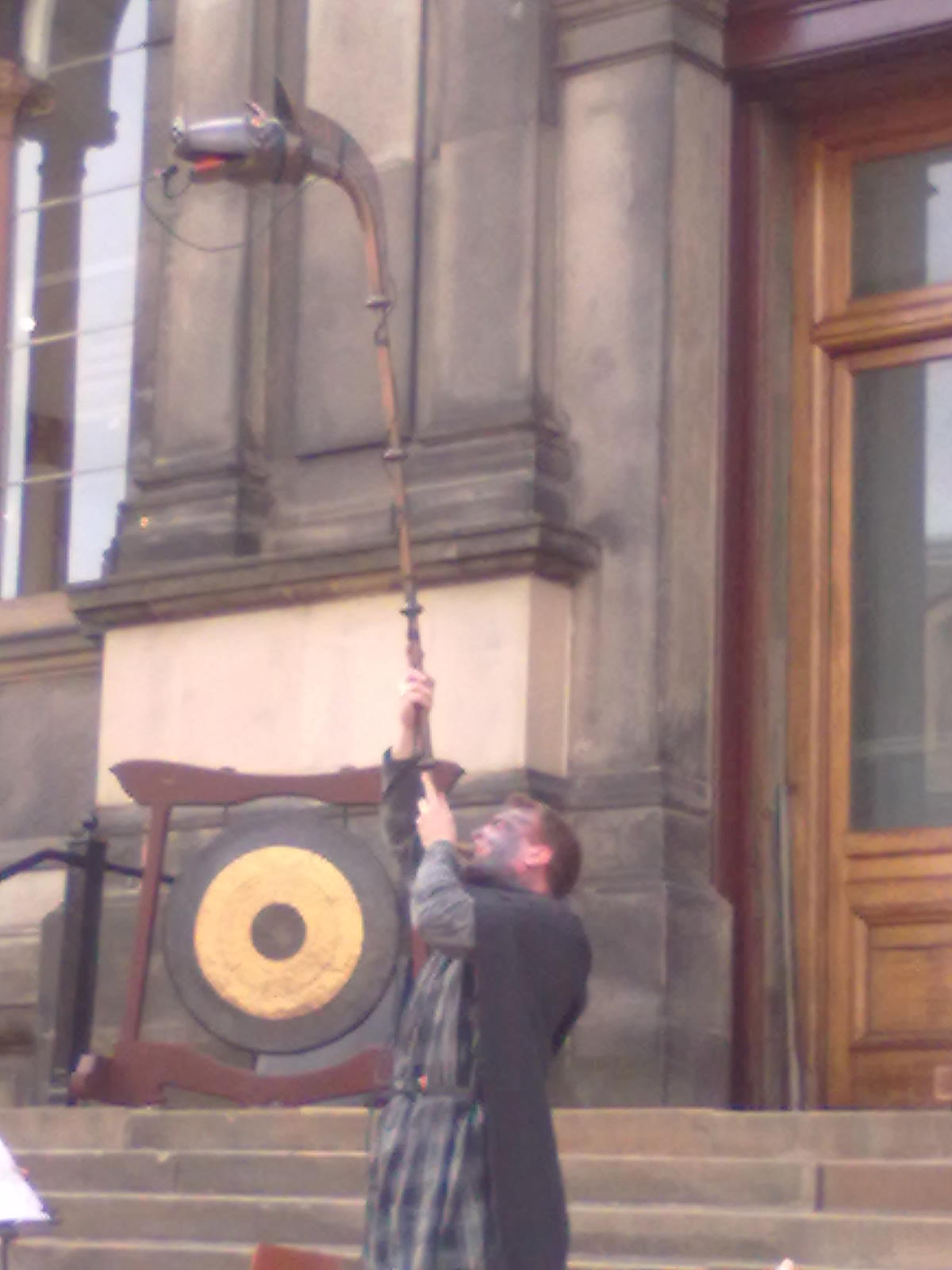
The Deskford reconstruction at the Museum of Scotland

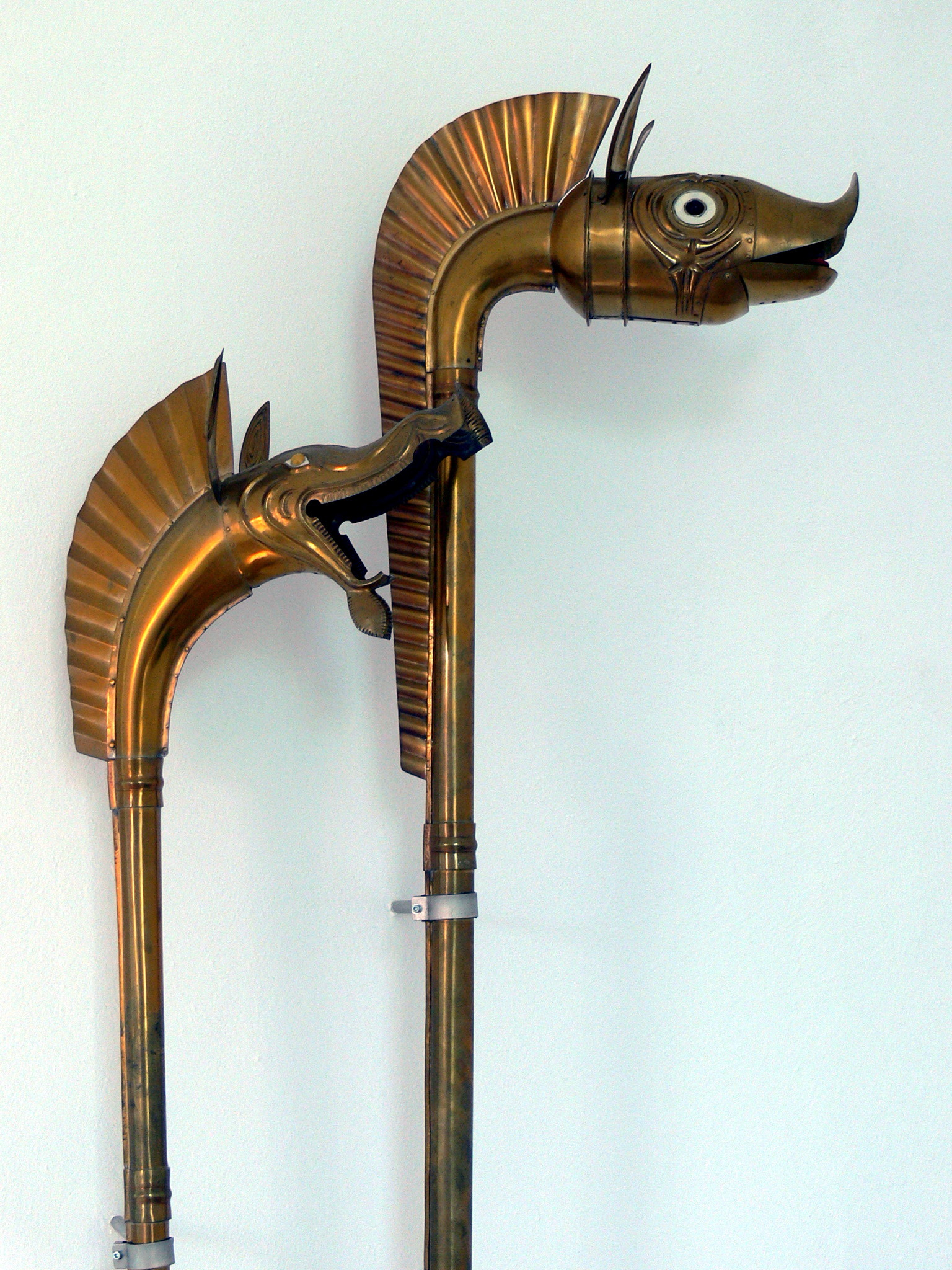
German reconstructions

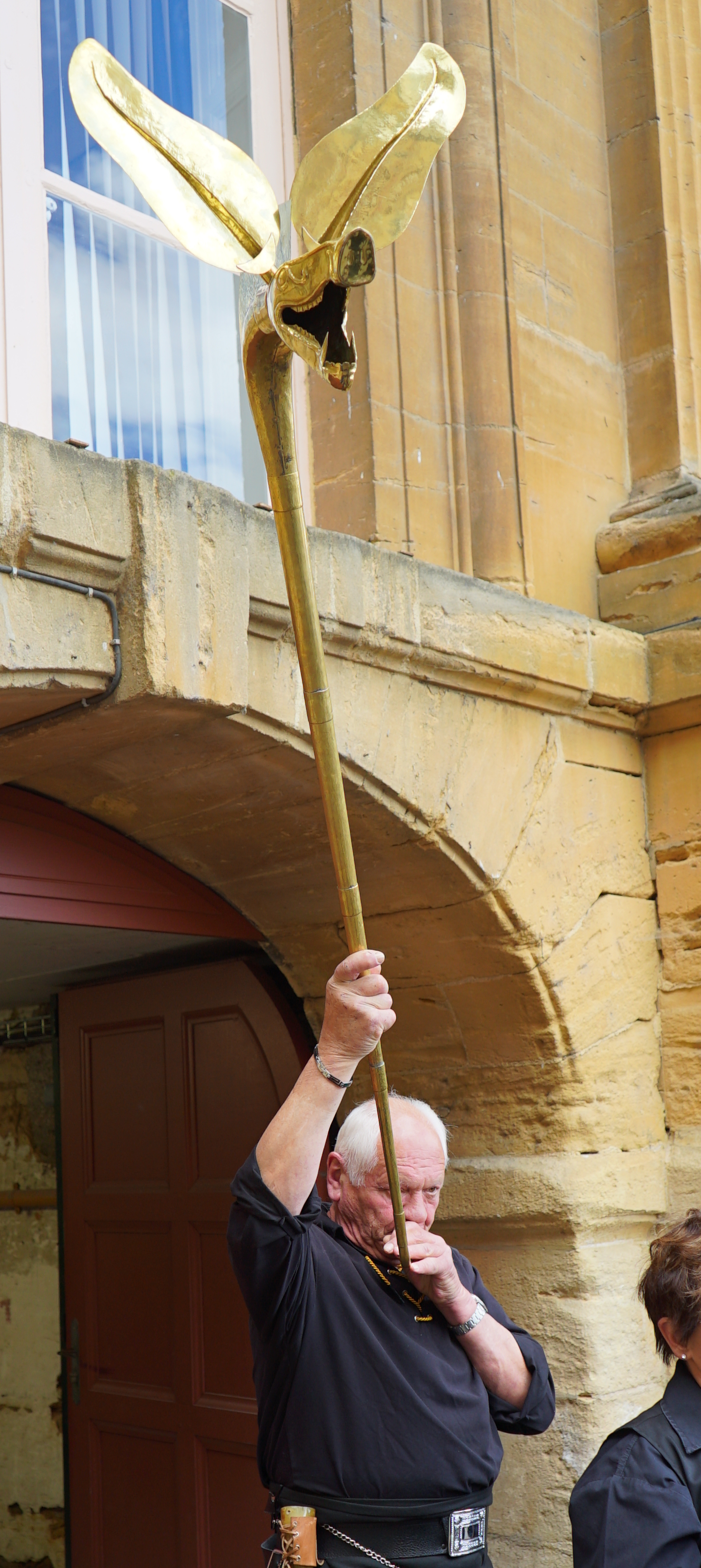
French reconstruction

== In popular culture ==
Carnyces are included as historical detail in various depictions of the ancient Roman and Celtic world. For instance, several carnyces are visible (though not audible) in the opening battle scene of the 2000 film Gladiator, and they are used as a musical instrument in the soundtrack of its 2024 sequel Gladiator II. The carnyx is also used in the Gallic soundtrack in Sid Meier's Civilization VI. The bard Cacofonix from the Asterix series is often pictured carrying or occasionally blowing a carnyx.

== See also ==
- Dord (musical instrument), another type of Celtic trumpet that has been revived
- Draco (military standard)
- Kabura-ya
- Lituus
- Lur
