= List of listed buildings in Deskford, Moray =

This is a list of listed buildings in the parish of Deskford in Moray, Scotland.

== List ==
Name	Location	Date Listed	Grid Ref. (Note: Sometimes known as OSGB36, the grid reference (where provided) is based on the British national grid reference system used by the Ordnance Survey. • "Guide to National Grid". Ordnance Survey. • "Get-a-map". Ordnance Survey.)	Geo-coordinates	Notes	LB Number (Note: Historic Environment Scotland assign a unique alphanumeric identifier to each designated site in Scotland, for listed buildings this always begins with "LB", for example "LB12345".)	Image
Kirkton Of Deskford, Old Church Of St John And Burial Ground				57°38′32″N 2°49′28″W	Category A	2209	Upload Photo
Kirkton Of Deskford, Dominie				57°38′30″N 2°49′31″W	Category B	2211	Upload Photo
7 Berryhillock				57°38′06″N 2°49′53″W	Category C(S)	2206	Upload Photo
10 Berryhillock				57°38′07″N 2°49′53″W	Category B	2207	Upload Photo
Berryhillock, Mill, Old Mill Of Berryhillock				57°38′04″N 2°49′48″W	Category C(S)	2213	Upload Photo
Post Office And 6 Berryhillock				57°38′05″N 2°49′53″W	Category C(S)	2205	Upload Photo
2 Berryhillock				57°38′04″N 2°49′55″W	Category C(S)	2203	Upload Photo
11 Berryhillock				57°38′07″N 2°49′52″W	Category C(S)	2208	Upload Photo
St John's Church (Church Of Scotland)				57°38′27″N 2°49′52″W	Category B	2212	Upload Photo
4 Berryhillock				57°38′05″N 2°49′52″W	Category C(S)	2204	Upload Photo
Kirkton Of Deskford, The Muckle Hoose				57°38′32″N 2°49′27″W	Category B	2210	Upload Photo

== Key ==
The scheme for classifying buildings in Scotland is:

- Category A: "buildings of national or international importance, either architectural or historic; or fine, little-altered examples of some particular period, style or building type."
- Category B: "buildings of regional or more than local importance; or major examples of some particular period, style or building type, which may have been altered."
- Category C: "buildings of local importance; lesser examples of any period, style, or building type, as originally constructed or moderately altered; and simple traditional buildings which group well with other listed buildings."

In March 2016 there were 47,288 listed buildings in Scotland. Of these, 8% were Category A, and 50% were Category B, with the remaining 42% being Category C.

== See also ==
- List of listed buildings in Moray
