= Deskford =

Coordinates: 57.642°N 2.825°W

Deskford: Scottish Gaelic: Deasgard
- Location within Moray
- Council area: Moray
- Lieutenancy area: Banffshire
- Country: Scotland
- Sovereign state: United Kingdom
- Police: Scotland
- Fire: Scottish
- Ambulance: Scottish

Deskford (Scottish Gaelic: Deasgard) is a parish and a small settlement in Moray, Scotland, formerly in Banffshire.

A number of significant historical and archaeological remains have been found in the area, notably the remains of a carnyx.

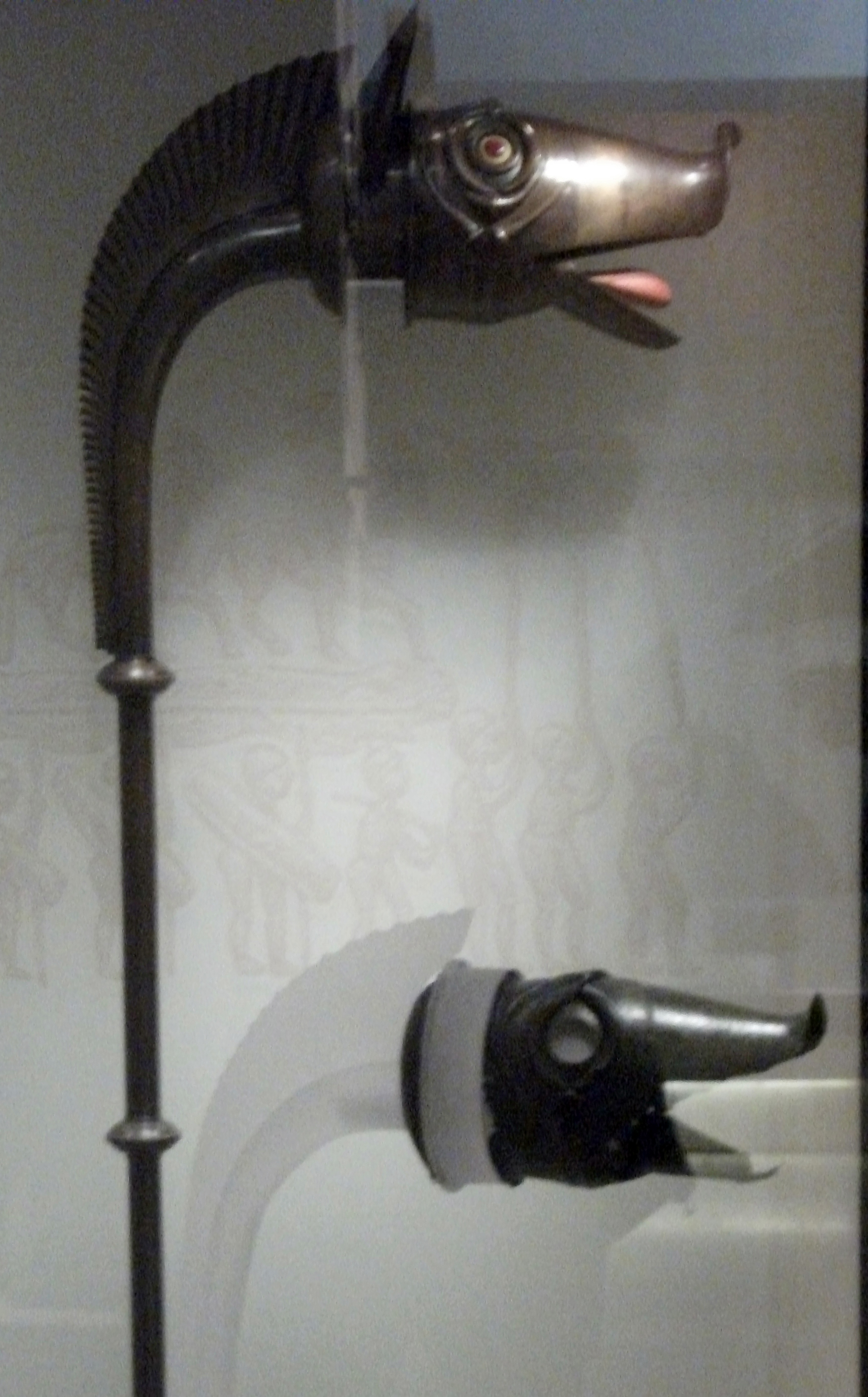
The Leichestown Deskford carnyx & reconstruction. Museum of Scotland

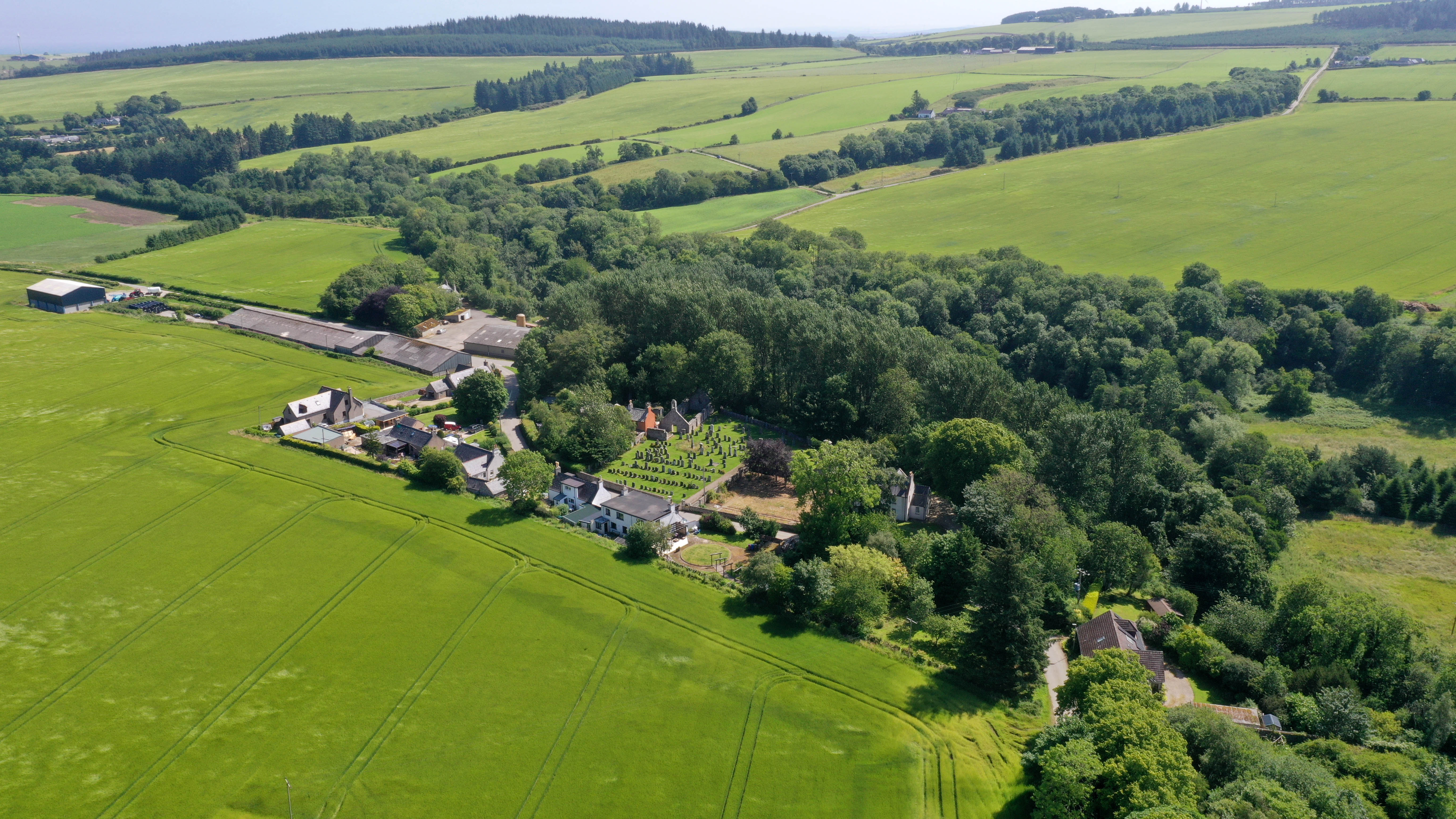
The hamlet of Deskford.

== See also ==
- List of listed buildings in Deskford, Moray
