= Chicken Run: Dawn of the Nugget (soundtrack) =

2023 film soundtrack album

Chicken Run: Dawn of the Nugget (Original Motion Picture Soundtrack)

Soundtrack album by Harry Gregson-Williams
- Released: 15 December 2023
- Recorded: 2023
- Studios: AIR Studios, London
- Genre: Film score
- Length: 65:38
- Label: Sony Masterworks
- Producer: Harry Gregson-Williams

Harry Gregson-Williams chronology
| Retribution (2023) | Chicken Run: Dawn of the Nugget (2023) | Gladiator II (2024) |

Chicken Run: Dawn of the Nugget (Original Motion Picture Soundtrack) is the soundtrack album composed by Harry Gregson-Williams, who previously co-scored Chicken Run (2000), for the film of the same name and released by Sony Masterworks on 15 December 2023.

== Background ==
In June 2023, it was announced that Harry Gregson-Williams would compose the film score for Chicken Run: Dawn of the Nugget. It was his fifth project for Aardman Animations after previously composing Chicken Run, Flushed Away (2006), Arthur Christmas (2011) and Early Man (2018). Notably, John Powell who had co-composed Chicken Run did not return for the sequel, thereby making Gregson-Williams as the sole composer; something which he similarly did for the later installments in the Shrek franchise. Gregson-Williams said that the film had "all the elements and characteristics of any Aardman film, with a lot of humor and a lot of heart. But at its core it's really a movie about a family being incredibly happy together, then being separated and then finding their way back together". As he liked the characters and had emotionally connected with the sequel, he was delighted to compose music for it.

The initial idea with Sam Fell was to take thematic materials from the first film, which he and Powell co-composed; taking the strong themes and then develop it to the sequel, but also write new thematic materials for the new characters. He felt that revisiting the themes and melodies provided a "warm and fuzzy feeling". Likewise, he also recorded the choir with kazoos, as he did with the first film. The score had hints of Mission: Impossible themes, which served as the inspiration for this film, and also reworked the popular main theme in the crucial heist sequences. He used a waka waka guitar for the action themes, recorded saxophones, ukuleles and a balalaika, which was the main instrument for Mrs. Tweedy. Her theme was expanded from the first film which also used the same instrument.

== Release ==
Chicken Run: Dawn of the Nugget soundtrack was released by Sony Masterworks on 15 December 2023, the same day as the film's Netflix release. The album featured 21 tracks from Gregson-Williams' score along with an original song "My Sweet Baby" performed by Paloma Faith.

== Reception ==
Filmtracks wrote "The sequel's music is a competent and amicable extension of the same general sound but without those highlights, and listeners will find it tough to resist the urge to revisit the Chicken Run score to scratch the itches caused by this music." Nikki Baughan of Screen International wrote "The score, by returning composer Harry Gregson-Williams, is relaxed and lilting". Peter Debruge of Variety called it an "overly busy, occasionally Lalo Schifrin-inspired score".

== Track listing ==
| No. | Title | Length |
|---|---|---|
| 1. | "Opening Recap" | 1:21 |
| 2. | "My Sweet Baby" (Paloma Faith) | 2:21 |
| 3. | "Molly" | 6:23 |
| 4. | "Trucks Are Spotted" | 3:29 |
| 5. | "Frizzle" | 2:48 |
| 6. | "Funland Farms" | 4:00 |
| 7. | "Rats Visited" | 1:06 |
| 8. | "Team Assignments" | 0:30 |
| 9. | "Something Strange" | 1:54 |
| 10. | "Go Time" | 4:12 |
| 11. | "Roast Chicken" | 2:21 |
| 12. | "Big and Brave" | 4:03 |
| 13. | "Presentation Music" | 1:41 |
| 14. | "Malicia Tweedy Revealed" | 3:22 |
| 15. | "An Unexpected Guest" | 4:42 |
| 16. | "Follow Me" | 4:27 |
| 17. | "Going Back for Frizzle" | 2:29 |
| 18. | "Ready to Fry, Fry" | 2:49 |
| 19. | "Move Faster" | 1:05 |
| 20. | "It's Sweet and Sour" | 1:42 |
| 21. | "Pushing Them Back" | 6:25 |
| 22. | "Returning Home" | 2:28 |
| Total length: | | 65:38 |

== Personnel ==
Credits adapted from Film Music Reporter:

- Music composer, producer and conductor: Harry Gregson-Williams
- Additional music: Jonathan Keith, Halli Cauthery
- Orchestration: Alastair King
- Music editor: Tony Lewis
- Recording and mixing: Pete Cobbin & Kirsty Whalley
- Recordist: Jack Mills
- Assistant score engineers: Rebecca Hardem & Ben Creasey
- Score mix editor: Wes Hicks
- Synth recording: Ryder McNair
- Music production supervisor: Monica Zierhut
- Music preparation: Booker White & Jill Streater
- Music contractor: Jenny Goshawk for Isobel Griffiths Ltd
- Concert master: Perry Montague-Mason
- Choir: Apollo Voices
- Choir master: Chris Foster
- Specialist percussion: Hal Rosenfeld
- Guitar: Vivian Vilichkoff
- Double bass: Alexandra Eckhardt
- Sax and jazz Flute: Katisse Buckingham

== Accolades ==
| Award | Date of ceremony | Category | Recipient(s) | Result | Ref. |
|---|---|---|---|---|---|
| Hollywood Music in Media Awards | 15 November 2023 | Best Original Score — Animated Film | Harry Gregson-Williams | Nominated | |
