= Naves, Corrèze =

Naves
- Commune
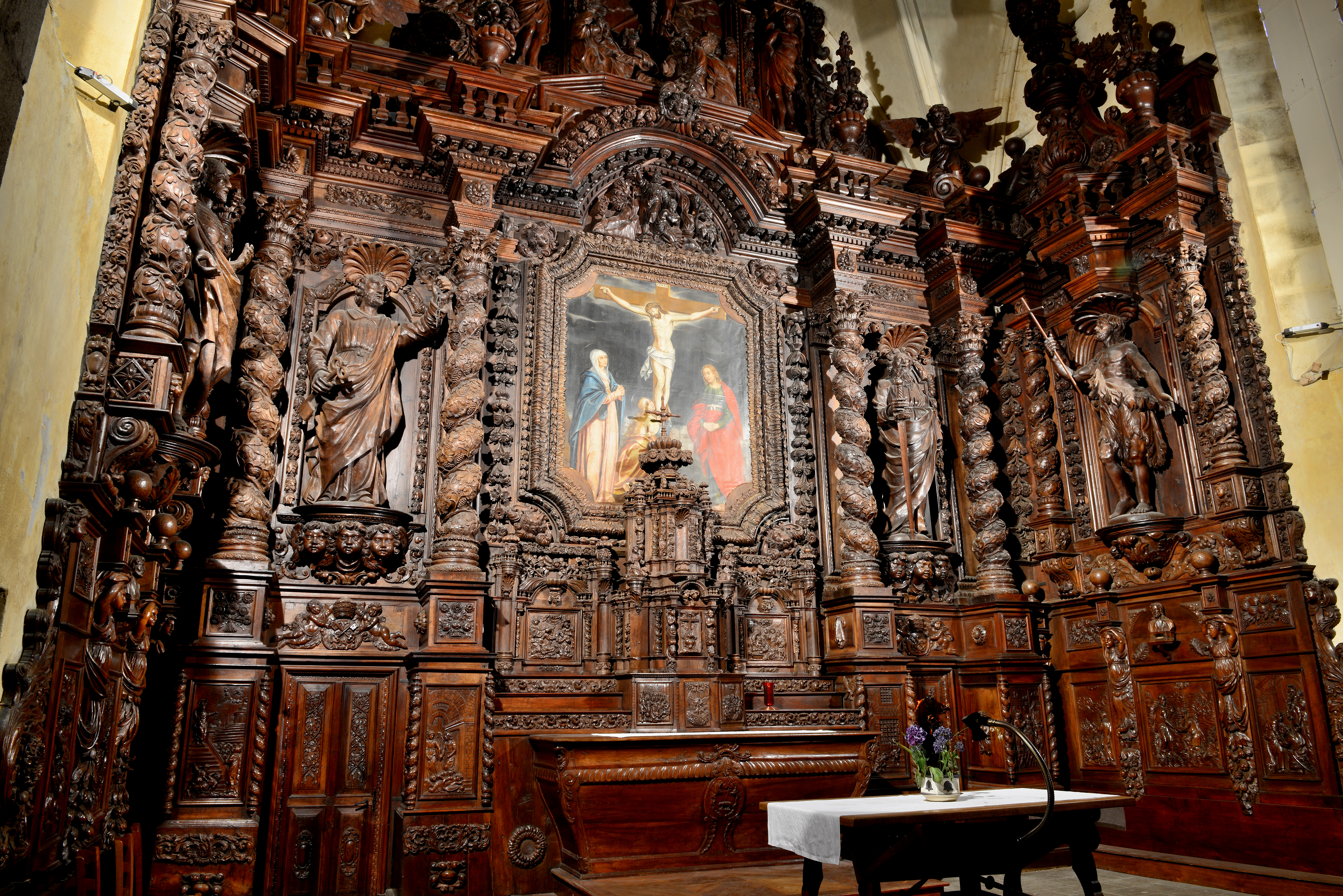
- The carved wooden altar, in Saint Peter's Church

- Coat of arms
- Location of Naves
- Location within France Location within Nouvelle-Aquitaine
- Coordinates: 45°18′50″N 1°46′00″E
- Country: France
- Region: Nouvelle-Aquitaine
- Department: Corrèze
- Arrondissement: Tulle
- Canton: Naves
- Intercommunality: CA Tulle Agglo

Government
  - Mayor (2020–2026): Hervé Longy
- Area^{1}: 35.93 km^{2} (13.87 sq mi)
- Highest elevation: 505 m (1,657 ft)
- Lowest elevation: 222 m (728 ft)
- Population (2023): 2,281
  - Density: 63.48/km^{2} (164.4/sq mi)
- Time zone: UTC+01:00 (CET)
  - Summer (DST): UTC+02:00 (CEST)
- INSEE/Postal code: 19146 /19460
- ^{1} French Land Register data, which excludes lakes, ponds, glaciers > 1 km^{2} (0.386 sq mi or 247 acres) and river estuaries.

Naves (French pronunciation: [nav]; Occitan: Navas) is a commune in the Corrèze department in the Nouvelle-Aquitaine region in central France.

== Geography ==
Naves's territory is crossed by the rivers Corrèze, Solane, Vigne, Vimbelle, and Céronne.

== History ==
Situated on the crossroad of two importants Roman ways, Naves of Latin Navea (fertile valley), was established in Gallo-Roman period, in this time the village included temples, theater and many other monuments.

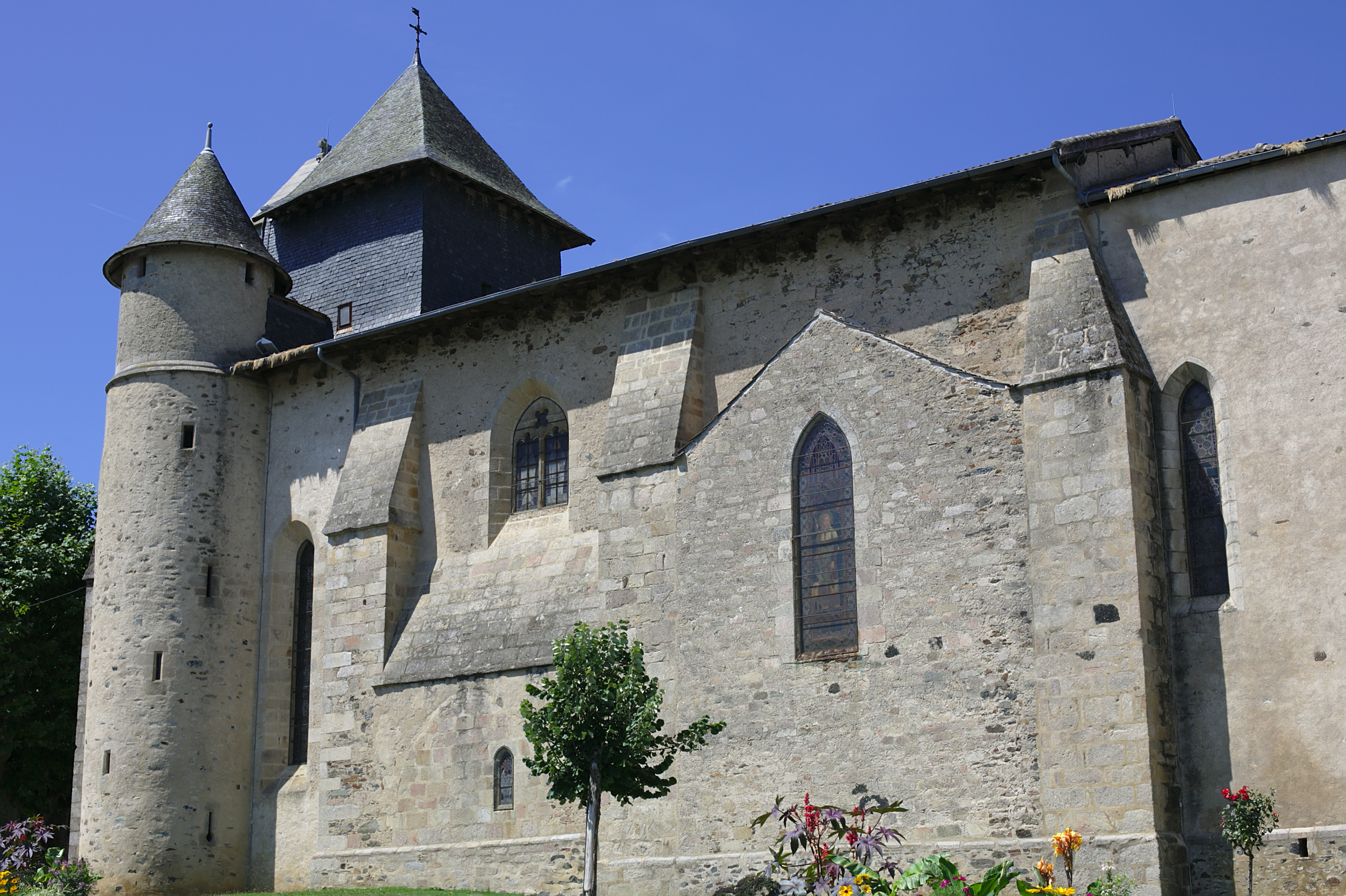
St. Peter's Church.

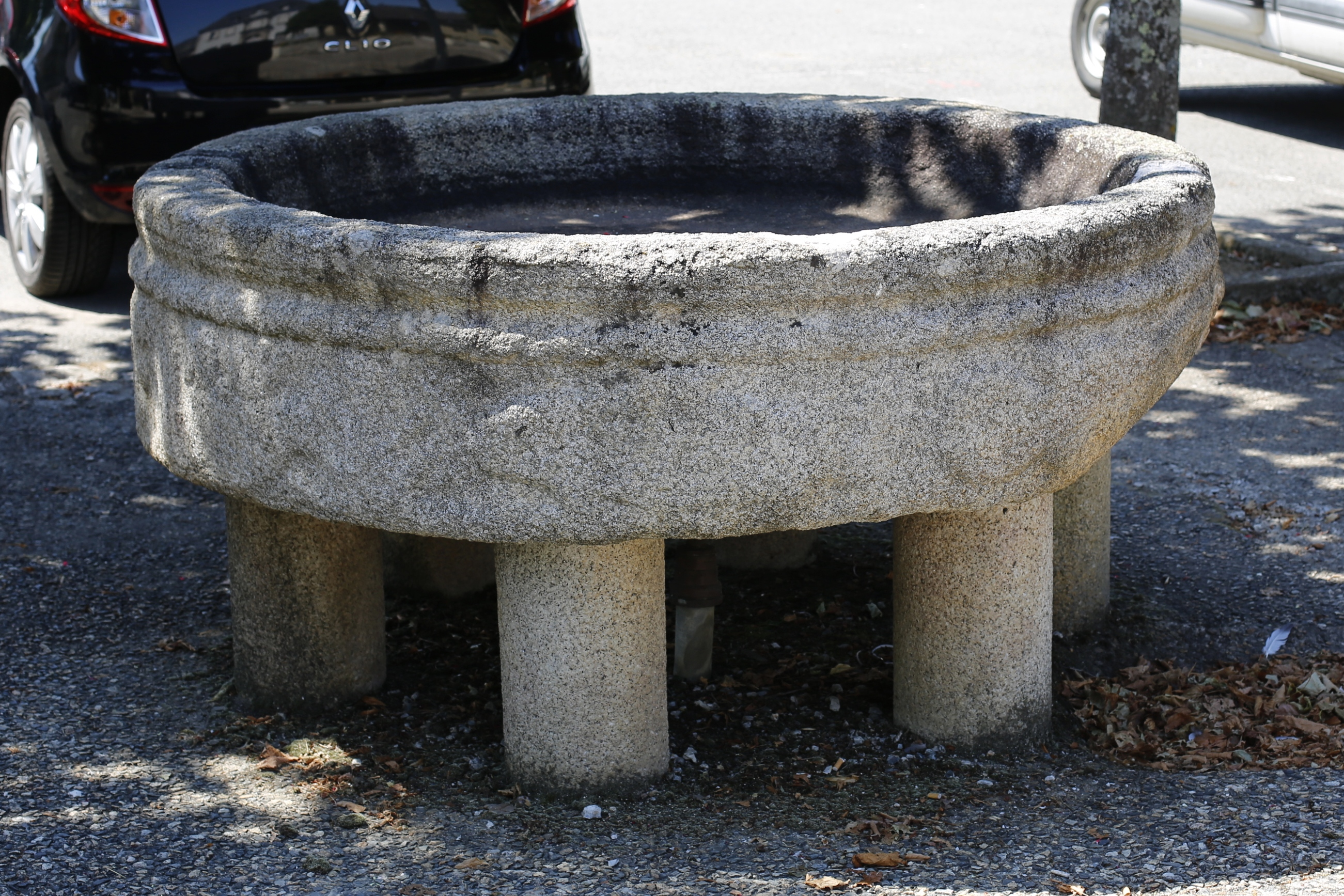
Baptistry.

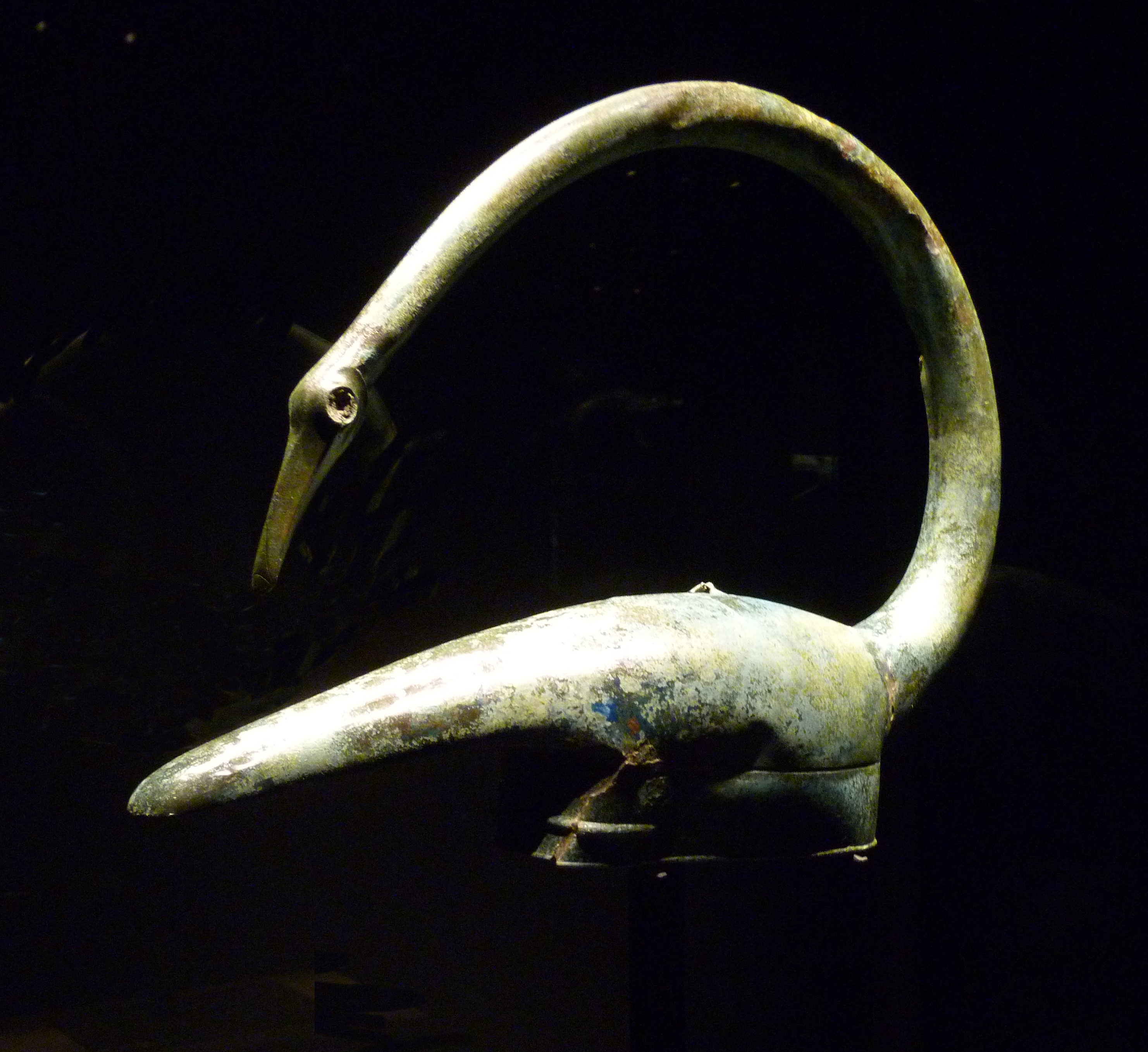
Gaulish helmet found in Tintignac.

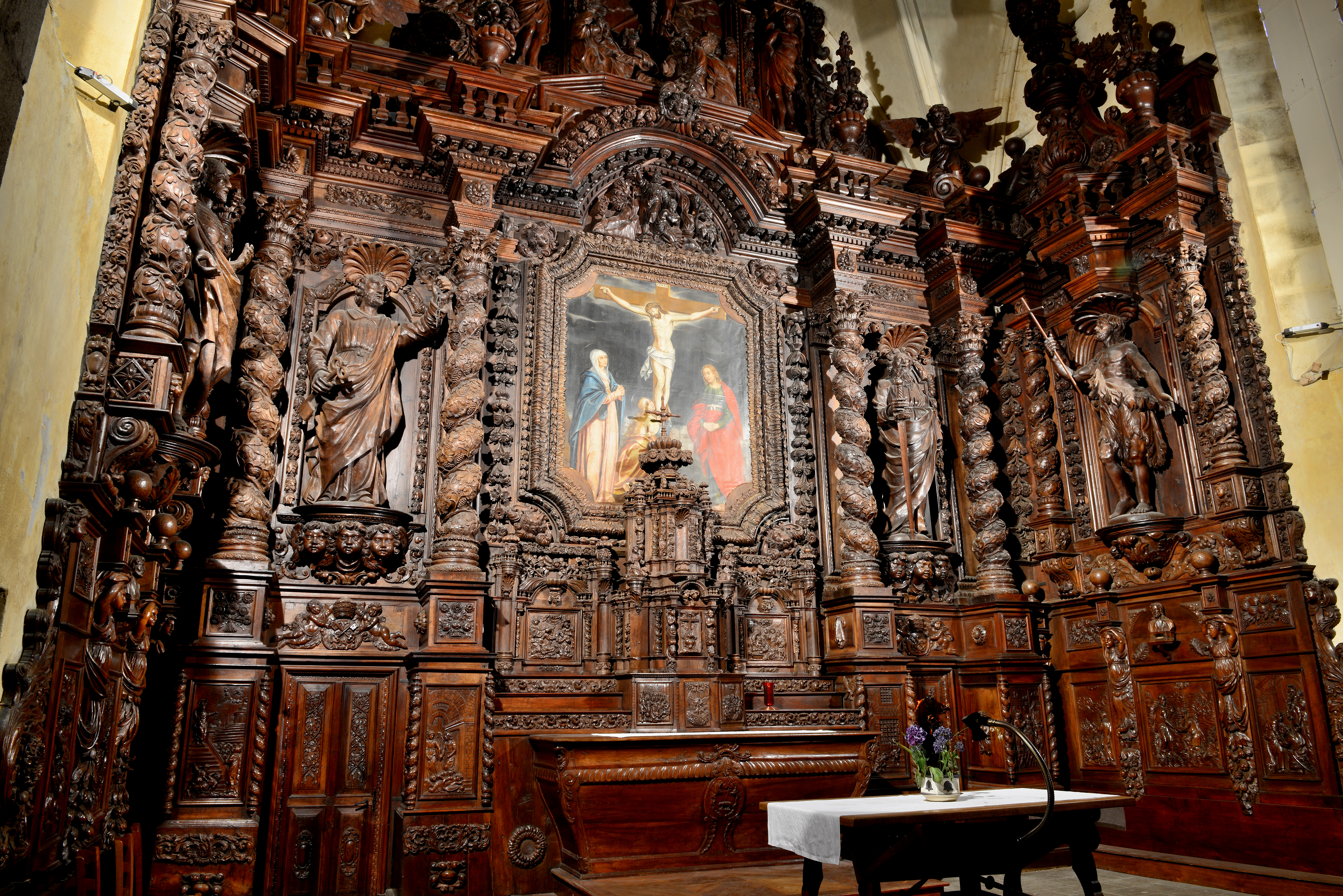
Altarpiece of St. Peter's Church.

== Population ==
After a long decline in population since 1900, Naves enjoyed an upswing around 1990, partly due to the arrival of the A89 motorway linking Lyon to Bordeaux.

Historical population

Year	Pop.	±% p.a.
1793	1,532	—
1800	1,664	+1.19%
1806	1,584	−0.82%
1821	2,046	+1.72%
1831	2,312	+1.23%
1836	2,171	−1.25%
1841	2,152	−0.18%
1846	2,318	+1.50%
1851	2,438	+1.01%
1856	2,504	+0.54%
1861	2,512	+0.06%
1866	2,358	−1.26%
1872	2,599	+1.64%
1876	2,297	−3.04%
1881	2,293	−0.03%
1886	2,371	+0.67%
1891	2,350	−0.18%
1896	2,419	+0.58%
1901	2,367	−0.43%

Year	Pop.	±% p.a.
1906	2,321	−0.39%
1911	2,144	−1.57%
1921	1,982	−0.78%
1926	1,835	−1.53%
1931	1,662	−1.96%
1936	1,547	−1.42%
1946	1,535	−0.08%
1954	1,506	−0.24%
1962	1,410	−0.82%
1968	1,386	−0.29%
1975	1,534	+1.46%
1982	1,912	+3.20%
1990	2,187	+1.69%
1999	2,037	−0.79%
2007	2,260	+1.31%
2012	2,338	+0.68%
2017	2,320	−0.15%
2023	2,281	−0.28%

Source: EHESS and INSEE

== See also ==
- Communes of the Corrèze department
