= Lajoumard =

- Interactive map of Lajoumard
- Coordinates: 45°52′24″N 1°28′55″E
- Country: France

Lajoumard (French pronunciation: [laʒumaʁ]) is a village in Limousin, France. According to its inhabitants, it is one of the oldest villages in the area. Located between Saint-Léonard-de-Noblat and Le Châtenet-en-Dognon, it has about 20 old houses with stone walls. The two small driving-roads that cross the village become very narrow in the inner village, and houses are tangled as in a small Mediterranean town.

Many old trails pass through Lajoumard, which is on the Way of Saint James. A typical old French school at the village's entrance has been converted to a house. Surrounded by fields and forests, Lajoumard is within nature, which brings prunes, apples, pears or chestnuts, depending on the season. The preserved integration with nature gives an idea of how villages were in early-20th century France.
