= Lemovices =

Gallic tribe of the western Massif Central

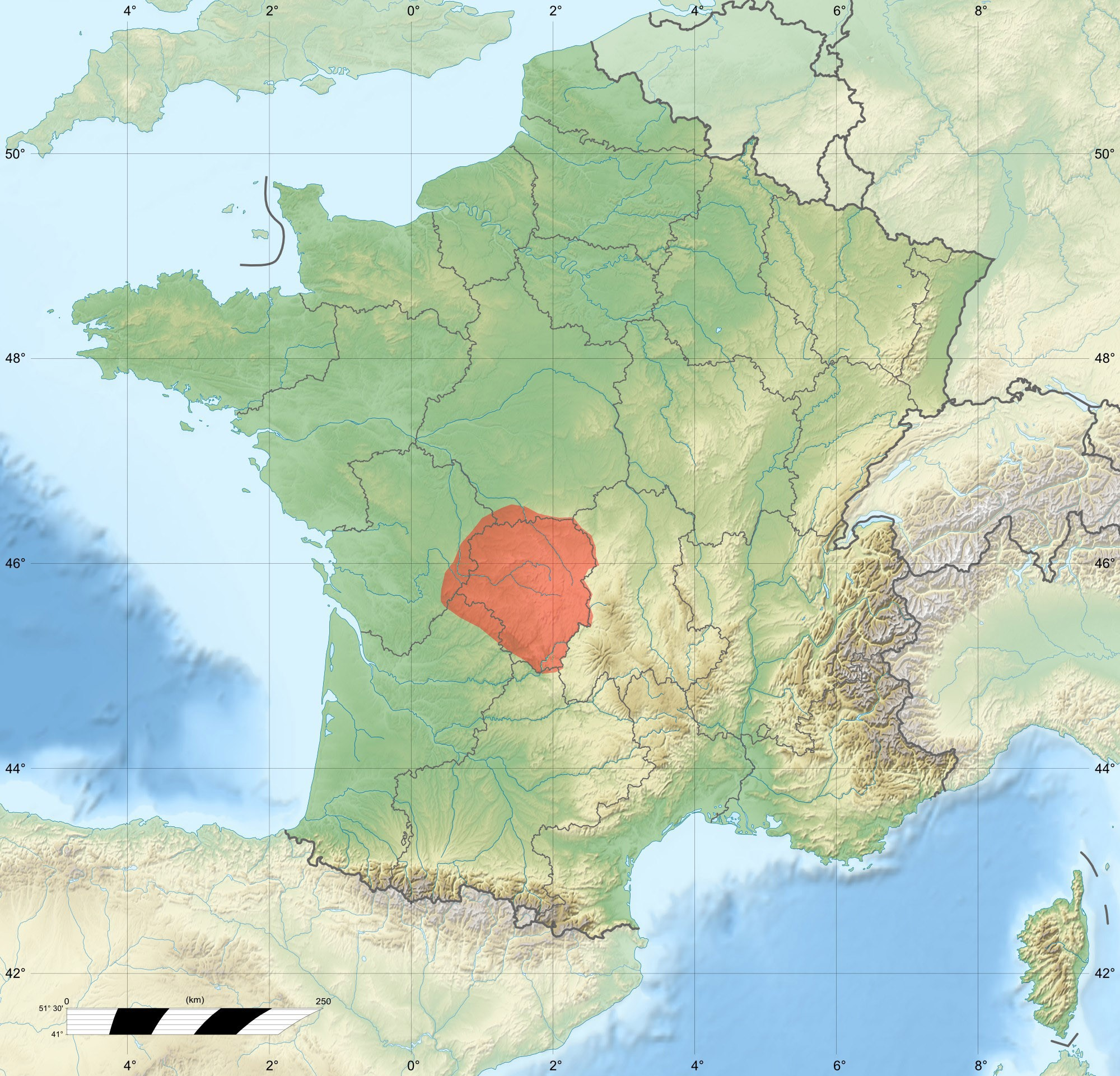
The territory of the Lemovices

The Lemovices were a Gallic tribe living in the western Massif Central during the Iron Age and the Roman period. They gave their name to the Limousin region and to its principal town, Limoges. Caesar records them among the peoples who raised a force to relieve the Roman siege of Alesia in 52 BC, and their leader Sedullus fell in the fighting there. Under Roman rule they formed a civitas administered from Augustoritum (Limoges), which Augustus attached to the province of Aquitania.

== Name ==
They are mentioned as Lemovices by Caesar (mid-1st c. BC) and Pliny (1st c. AD), Lemoouíkes (Λεμοουίκες) by Strabo (early 1st c. AD), and as Limouikoí (Λιμουικοί) by Ptolemy (2nd c. AD).

The Gaulish ethnonym *Lemouices means 'those who vanquish by the elm', probably in reference to the wood from which were made their spears or bows. It derives from the stem Celtic lēmo-, meaning 'elm', attached to the suffix -uices ('victors').

The city of Limoges, attested ca. 400 AD as civitas Lemovicum ('civitas of the Lemovices', Lemovicas in 844, Lemotges in 1208), and the Limousin region, attested in the 6th c. AD as Lemovicinum (pago Lemovicino in 860, Lemozi in 1071–1127), are named after the Gallic tribe.

A homonymous people, the Lemovices of Armorica, are listed by Caesar among the peoples of Armorica. They may be the same people whom Caesar may have listed by mistake among the Armorican peoples, or they may instead be a small people homonymous with the Lemovices of Limousin. Jean-Michel Desbordes supposed one people of common origin settled in two places, comparing them to the Bituriges Cubi of Berry and the Bituriges Vivisci of the Bordelais. On this view, one branch may have remained on the western plateaux of the Massif Central, while the other may have moved to the Atlantic coast. Robert Bedon, by contrast, takes them to be two distinct peoples sharing the same name.

== Geography ==
The territory of the Lemovices answers broadly to the crystalline uplands of the western Massif Central. Jean-Michel Desbordes proposed that the edge of this basement, where it meets the sedimentary lowlands of Berry to the north, Poitou and the Angoumois to the west, the Périgord to the south-west and the Quercy to the south, marked the natural limit of the civitas. So reckoned, the ancient territory corresponds roughly to the modern Limousin, with the Confolentais district of the Charente and the Nontronais of the northern Dordogne added.

For the pre-Roman period, their territory is reconstructed from the Gallo-Roman civitas, whose limits are in turn inferred from the medieval diocese of Limoges. Recent scholarship treats this regressive method with caution and places the limits mainly from the peripheral secondary agglomerations of the neighbouring peoples. (Note: Florian Mazel holds that the diocesan and civic limits can be equated only at small scale, within a band of 10 to 15 km, and Florian Baret works with a 12 km margin. Reconstructions from boundary place names such as equoranda and fines are likewise unreliable: only fines names confirmed by a station on an ancient itinerary carry weight, and the territory yields just two, on the roads to Périgueux and to Clermont-Ferrand, neither located with certainty.)

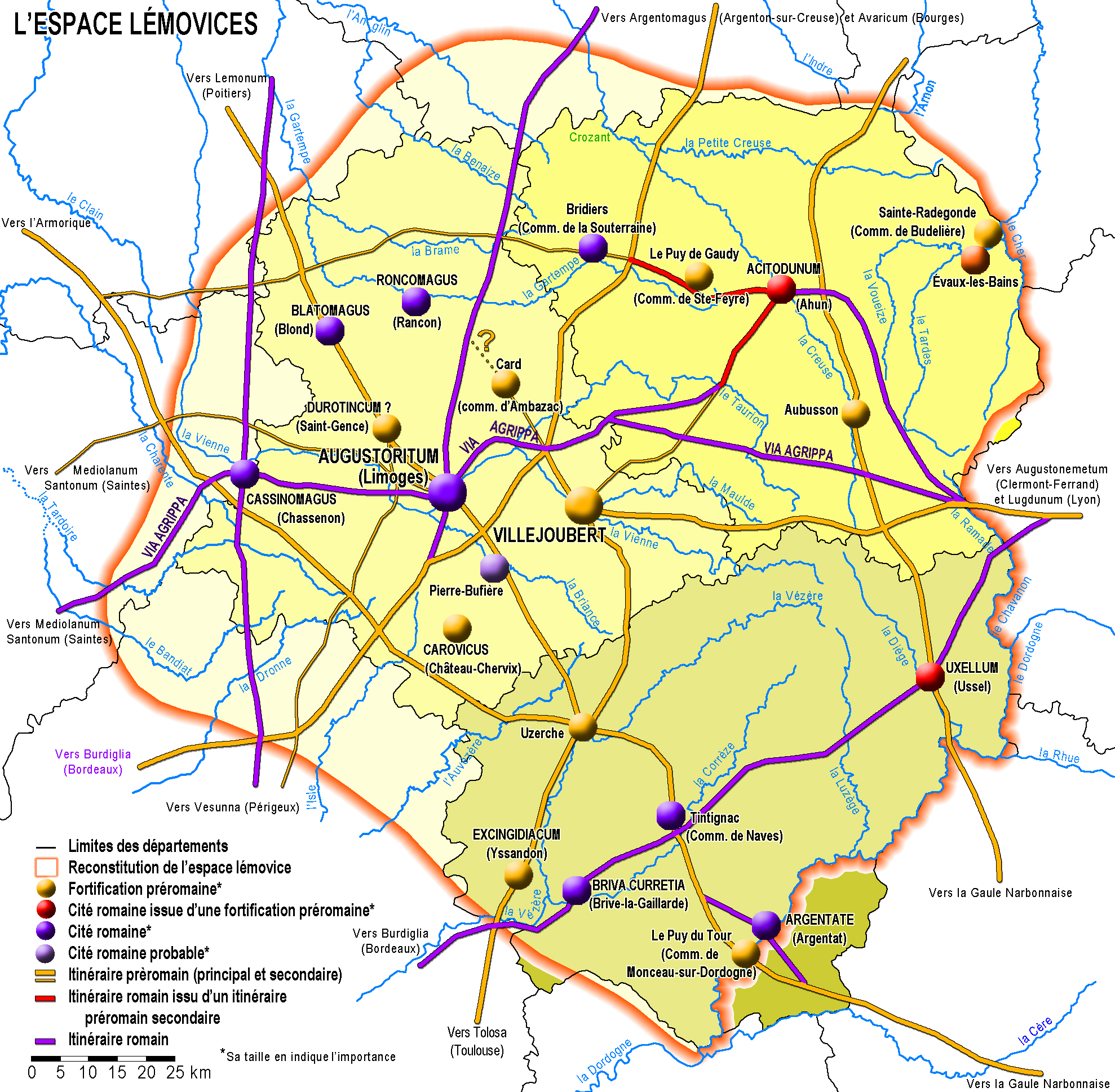
Reconstructions of Lemovician territory before and after the Roman conquest

The civitas bordered those of the Bituriges Cubi to the north and north-east, the Pictones to the north-west, the Santones and Petrocorii to the west and south-west, the Cadurci to the south, and the Arverni to the east and south-east. On the west it reached Cassinomagus (Chassenon), whose tie to the chief town carries the boundary to the edge of the modern Charente, and on the east the thermal vicus of Ivaunum (Évaux-les-Bains), at the meeting of the Lemovices, Arverni and Bituriges.

At the centre of the territory the granite Plateau de Millevaches forms an eroded upland largely without nucleated settlement, a gap in the urban network rather than an archaeological blank, since field survey has revealed a dense pattern of rural sites.

The Gallo-Roman civitas passed into the diocese of Limoges and then into the Carolingian county of Limoges. Jean-François Boyer holds that from the Augustan reorganisation of about 12 BC to the collapse of Carolingian administration in the 10th century, the Limousin kept its administrative unity within boundaries that scarcely moved, apart from minor encroachments by the neighbouring provinces. He sees in this long continuity, carried afterwards by the diocese and the cult of Martial, one of the roots of a durable Limousin identity.

== History ==
=== Gallic Wars ===
The Lemovices first appear in Caesar's account of the Gallic Wars, which says nothing of them before 52 BC. In that year Caesar counts them among the peoples that Vercingetorix brought over to his side at the outset of the revolt. They were not among the peoples subject to the imperium of the Arverni, such as the Cadurci, the Gabali and the Vellavii.

When the Gallic leaders raised a force to relieve the siege of Alesia in 52 BC, they set the Lemovician contingent at ten thousand men, the number also demanded of the Bellovaci, who sent only two thousand. Robert Bedon takes the figure for a notional maximum and holds that the number who actually marched cannot be known. In the rout of the relief army before Alesia the Lemovices lost their commander, Sedullus, whom Caesar calls their dux et princeps. (Note: The sense of princeps is disputed. Jean-Michel Desbordes takes it to mark a leader holding both civil and military power, like the Aeduan Dumnorix before him, whereas Robert Bedon reads it as marking Sedullus merely as one of the leading men of his people, not its supreme magistrate the vergobret, whose office would have kept its holder at home.)

Caesar's continuator, Aulus Hirtius, who wrote the 8th book of De Bello Gallico, records that two legions wintered among the Lemovices in 51 BC, close to the Arverni, so that no part of Gaul should be left without a garrison. Robert Bedon offers two readings of the measure: that Caesar meant to deter a fresh rising by the Lemovices and Arverni, or that he quartered the legions among a people now held safe in order to watch a neighbour still thought able to renew the war. Jean-Michel Desbordes finds the people's disposition toward Rome hard to read, since Caesar is silent on them before 52 BC and the wintering might reflect privileged relations as readily as the aftermath of revolt.

=== Roman period ===
In the Augustan reorganisation of Gaul, both Strabo and Pliny place the Lemovices among the peoples between the Garonne and the Loire whom Augustus attached to Aquitania. Pliny does not enter them among the free or federate communities, which has been taken to indicate that the civitas was stipendiary, among the less favoured of the province. Ptolemy, writing about a century later, names their chief town Augustoritum.

The Gallo-Roman civitas developed into the diocese of Limoges, Christianity having reached the chief town in the later 3rd or early 4th century under Martial, held to be its first bishop. In his account of Gaul, Ammianus Marcellinus does not name the Lemovices among the leading civitates of Aquitania, an omission that Bedon takes to reflect their middle rank. The Notitia Galliarum, compiled in the earlier 5th century, lists the civitas Lemovicum in Aquitania Prima, one of the provinces into which Aquitania had by then been divided. In the later 5th century Sidonius Apollinaris counted the see of Limoges among the Aquitanian dioceses left without bishops under the Visigothic king Euric. The last ancient writer to record the civitas is Ruricius, bishop of Limoges from about 485, whose letters preserve incidental notices of the town and of several of its lesser settlements.

== Settlements ==
=== Pre-Roman period ===
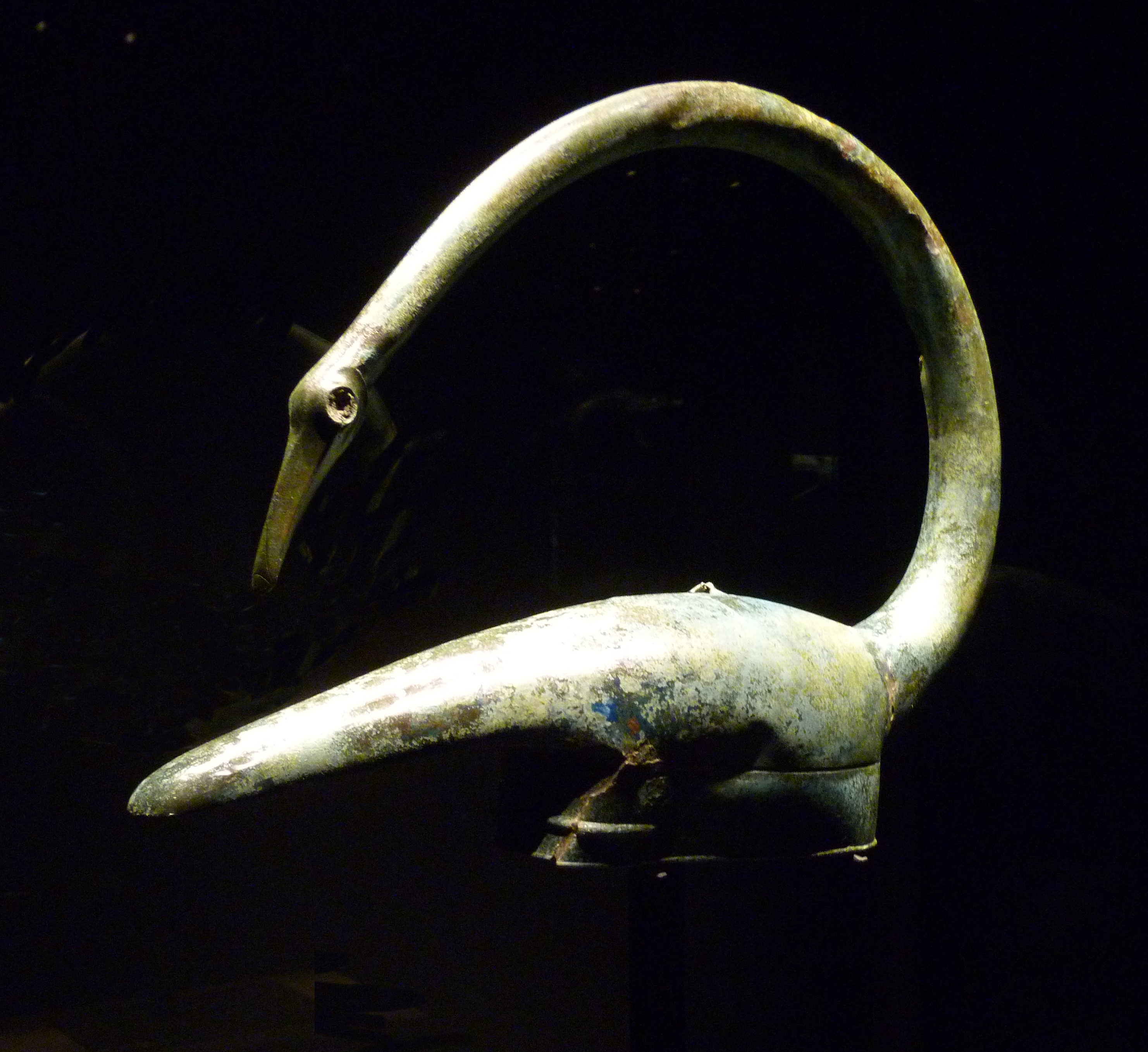
Bronze helmet surmounted by a swan (4th–2nd century BC), from the Gaulish deposit at Tintignac (Naves)

The principal oppidum of the Lemovices was Villejoubert, a large hilltop enclosure of about 230 hectares near the centre of the territory, which Jean-François Boyer suggests may have borne the name Durotincon. Other heights bear names or remains pointing to Iron Age occupation, among them Yssandon in the south, whose name in -dunum is characteristic of fortified hilltops. Further hilltop sites near the edges of the territory, such as the Puy du Tour at Monceaux-sur-Dordogne and Les Mureaux at Saint-Georges-Nigremont, are too poorly recorded to interpret, though their peripheral position has suggested a role in guarding the marches of the pagus.

Evidence for the pre-Roman period is clearest along the eastern march, in the modern Creuse, at a frontier zone between the Lemovices, the Bituriges and the Arverni. In the First Iron Age the district was organised around fortified hilltop centres, several of their ramparts vitrified, with associated barrow cemeteries read as aristocratic or warrior burials. The regional economy rested on metalworking, tin and gold in particular, and probably on floating timber down the Cher and the Creuse towards the Bituriges. The hilltop defences appear to lose their role in the Second Iron Age: at the Puy-de-Gaudy a rampart of murus gallicus type has been dated to around 220 BC.

For the later Iron Age, Léger reads the distribution of Viereckschanzen, of hilltop sites yielding Italic wine amphorae and of Gaulish coin hoards as marking the borders with the Biturigan and Arvernian spheres. (Note: On this basis Léger revives a suggestion of Georges Janicaud (1940), that much of the Creuse formed a distinct sub-group of the Lemovices bound by clientship to its three larger neighbours. The reconstruction rests in part on boundary place names now regarded as unreliable.)

=== Gallo-Roman agglomerations ===
The civitas was administered from Augustoritum (Limoges), a wholly new town founded under Augustus whose creation appears to have brought about the abandonment of the oppidum of Villejoubert. The capital received the full range of public monuments of a Gallo-Roman town: a forum, sanctuaries, baths, a theatre and an amphitheatre. It seems to have drawn no agglomerations to its immediate surroundings: the nearest, Saint-Gence, lies about 15 km away, and a wide zone to the west of Limoges is without grouped habitat. An inscription from the town records a vergobret, the annual chief magistrate of the civitas.

The network of secondary agglomerations is markedly unbalanced, most sites lying in the northern half of the territory. The south is served only by the interregional road from Clermont to Bordeaux, which links the three larger southern agglomerations of Ussel, Tintignac and Brive-la-Gaillarde. Several peripheral agglomerations carry monumental complexes, notably Cassinomagus (Chassenon) in the west and Ivaunum (Évaux-les-Bains) in the east, each with baths and monumental architecture, both standing at the edge of the territory on major interregional routes.

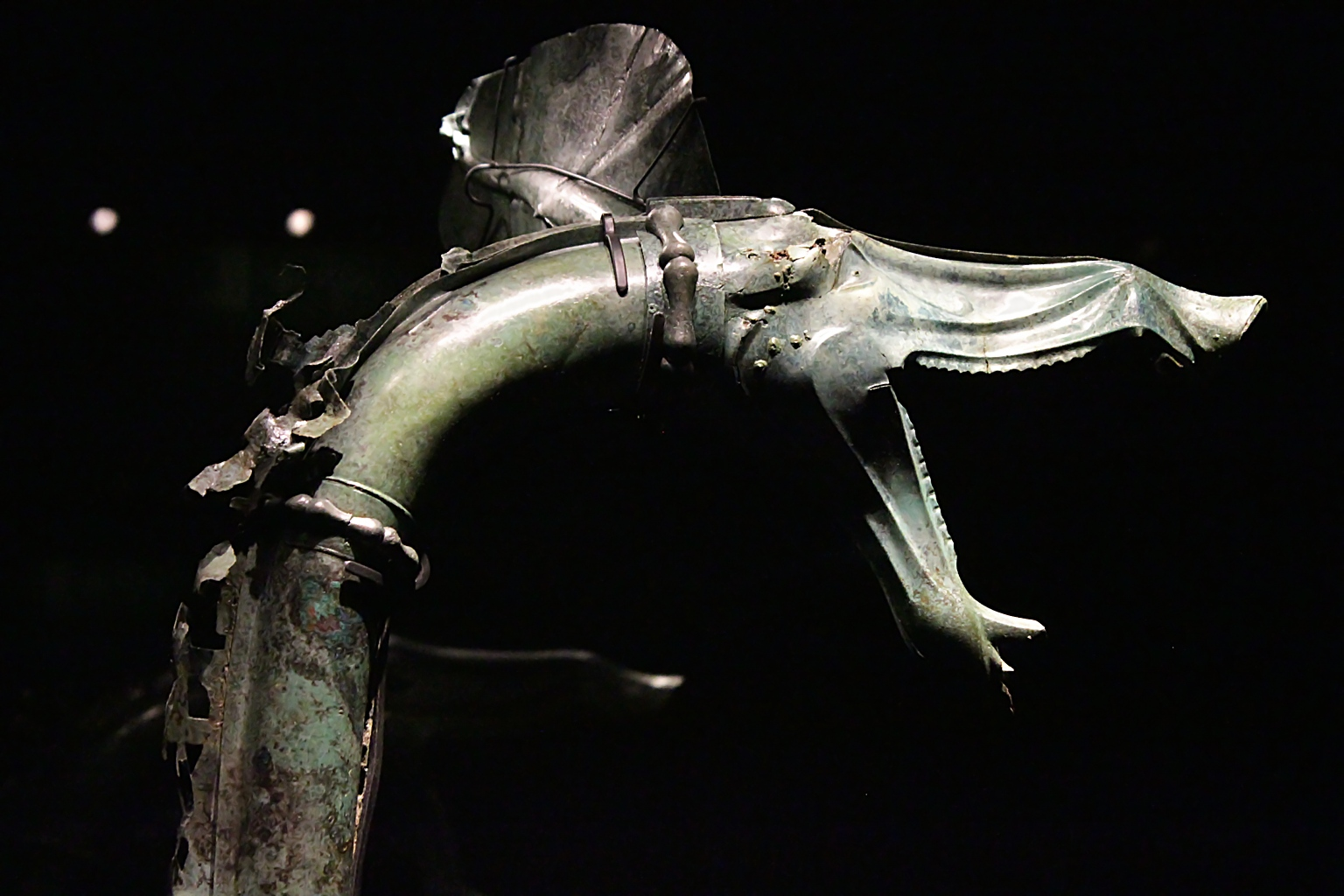
Carnyx from the Gaulish sanctuary of Tintignac (Naves)

The largest monumental centre after the capital is at Chassenon, which Blaise Pichon and Florian Baret regard as the second town of the civitas. It occupied some 20 hectares on the higher ground of the agglomeration and comprised a large double bath-building, a public sanctuary and a spectacle building. At Naves, the sanctuary of Tintignac joined a theatre to several cult buildings, among them a fanum (sanctuary) of protohistoric origin. The baths of Évaux-les-Bains, richly fitted with imported marble and porphyry, formed the core of that spa settlement.

A number of lesser settlements are known by name only from the imperial road itineraries and from the letters of the bishop Ruricius. (Note: The Antonine Itinerary and the Peutinger Table, recording the Lyon–Saintes highway of Agrippa and its branches, give the stations of Acitodunum (Ahun), Praetorium (a site at Sauviat-sur-Vige), Cassinomagus (Chassenon) and two frontier stations named Fines. The letters of Ruricius add Gemiliacum (Jumilhac-le-Grand), Userca (Uzerche) and Briva (Brive).)

== Society ==
The inhabitants of the civitas are known chiefly from funerary inscriptions, most of them found in the modern Creuse. Certain funerary formulae are markedly concentrated, among them the epithet vivus ('living'), marking a tomb set up during the owner's lifetime. (Note: Some thirty-eight gabled stelae carry seventy-three epitaphs, while only about seven cinerary chests bear one. Vivus appears on twenty-eight of the seventy-three texts, and suus accounts for fifteen of the seventeen instances known in the Massif Central.)

The names recorded mix Roman citizens and peregrini (free provincial subjects), and Latin and Celtic forms, several of them first attested in Aquitania among the Lemovices. (Note: Among them the Latin nomen Paccius and the apparently Celtic Andomus, Suiato and Belliccossa, while Remmius is of disputed Latin or Celtic origin.) Some texts point to local notables, as at Jabreilles-les-Bordes, where a family recorded its gift of statues to adorn the civitas, though no magistracy is named.

Outside the capital, epigraphic traces of the local elite come from four agglomerations, at Chassenon, Châteauponsac, Évaux-les-Bains and Naves. The recorded acts of munificence are comparatively early and dominated by peregrini, whose gifts served to reinforce the Roman character of civic life or to advertise loyalty to the emperor. At the chief town the elite is better attested and was not exclusively Lemovician, the earliest recorded act being the gift of an aqueduct by the vergobret Postumus in the second quarter of the 1st century AD. (Note: At Châteauponsac an inscription records the building of a monument, probably an altar, by Vericus and his son Lucanus for the welfare of the emperor. At Limoges, Tiberius Taurius Taurianus and his father, both former duumviri of the civitas, were honoured with a monument, and a decurion of the Aulerci Eburovices had his tomb built there during his lifetime.)

The wealth of the aristocracy is clearest at Limoges, where the first large Mediterranean-style domus were laid out between about 30 and 45 AD. The largest, below the forum, covered some 3,700 square metres, exceeding the largest houses known at Pompeii or in Gauls, and was decorated with stone from distant quarries. The elite otherwise seem to have lived on rural estates, some richly appointed, such as a large villa at Ahun more than 150 m long.

Wealthier families built monumental tombs of large granite blocks, attested across the territory, often known only from blocks reused in medieval churches and from the two tomb-temples of Les Cars at Saint-Merd-les-Oussines. This funerary display points to a differentiation within Lemovician society reaching beyond the political elite and the Roman citizens, to those able to commission monumental work and advertise their standing.

The most striking of these tombs is the mausoleum of Châteauponsac, whose burial deposit was without parallel in the region: two dismantled chariots, five bronze figurines and a set of hunting equipment. Pichon and Baret relate it to the aristocratic practice of hunting rather than to any survival of indigenous custom.

== Religion ==
The territory has yielded 24 ancient inscriptions of religious character, most of them from places of worship. Apart from those found in the chief town, only three or four can be assigned with confidence to identified secondary agglomerations, at Évaux-les-Bains, Rancon and Pontarion. At Augustoritum itself, a sanctuary in the indigenous tradition was founded in the Augustan period.

At Ivaunum (Évaux-les-Bains), a thermal vicus of probably pre-Roman origin, a votive dedication on a bronze patera names a god Ivaos, otherwise unattested and probably connected with water, who appears to have given the settlement its name. (Note: The dedication (CIL XIII, 1368), punched in dots on the handle and found in one of the site's wells, was made by Vimpuro, freedman of Firmus.) Roman healing deities are also present, with dedications to Aesculapius and Neptune.

At Rancon, on the Gartempe in the north-west of the civitas, two lapidary inscriptions survive. The first is a votive dedication to Hercules, the only epigraphic testimony to that cult among the Lemovices. The second records the building of a fanum to Pluto by a community called the Andecamulenses, whose name may preserve an ancient name of Rancon. (Note: The dedication to Hercules (CIL XIII, 1448), on a granite altar, was made by Tiberius Iulius Iulianus, a Roman citizen. The dedication to Pluto (CIL XIII, 1449), to the numina of the Augusti, dates between the Antonine period and the reign of Caracalla. The community name combines the intensive ande- with camulo- ('champion', 'powerful'), roughly 'the very powerful'.) It is the only known attestation of a temple to Pluto in Gaul.

At Thauron, near Pontarion, an altar dedicated to Iupiter Optimus Maximus, the Capitoline Jupiter, by a man named Taranuen attests a cult of essentially urban character. The dedicant's name is formed on that of the Celtic god Taranis, but its position in the text marks it as a personal name rather than a divine epithet.
