= Adrien Pressemane =

French politician and journalist (1879–1929)

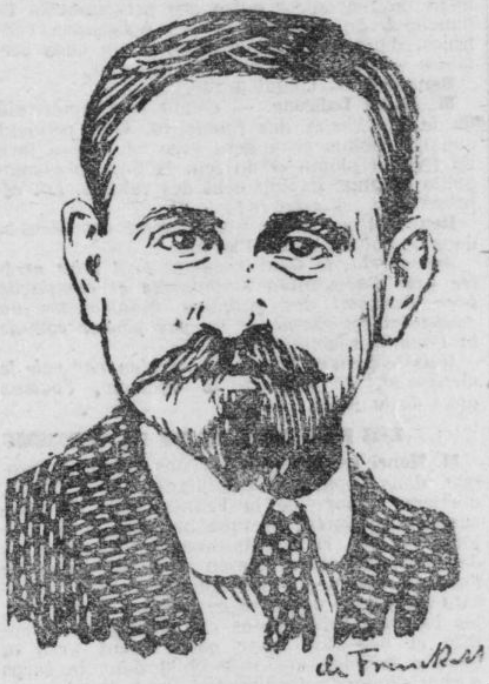

Member of the Chamber of Deputies for Haute-Vienne
- In office 1 June 1914 – 31 May 1924

Mayor of Saint-Léonard-de-Noblat
- In office 1919–1929
- Preceded by: Aristide Constant
- Succeeded by: Louis Valadas

Personal details
- Born: 31 January 1879 Limoges, France
- Died: 26 January 1929 (aged 49) Limoges, France
- Party: French Section of the Workers' International

Adrien Pressemane (French pronunciation: [adʁiɛ̃ pʁɛsman]; 31 January 1879 – 26 January 1929) was a French politician and journalist. He was the chief editor of Le Populaire du Centre.

== Work ==
Pressemane worked as a porcelain painter in Saint-Léonard-de-Noblat before serving in Parliament for the local district. A general councillor of Haute-Vienne, elected in the canton of Saint-Léonard-de-Noblat (1905–1928), the mayor of Saint-Léonard-de-Noblat (1919–1929), as well as a member of the Chamber of Deputies (1914–1924), he was the leader of a pacifist trend during World War I.

A Guesdist, he worked with Guesde in the French Workers' Party (Parti Ouvrier Français, POF). He teamed up with Léon Betoulle on issues related to the success of French Section of the Workers' International (Section Française de l'Internationale Ouvrière, SFIO). He tried to avoid the collapse of the SFIO at the 1920 Tours Congress, but the aftermath was the creation of the French Communist Party. His speech at the 2nd World Congress of the Comintern of 1920 demonstrated his lack of commonality with the Third International.
