= Lemovices (Armorica) =

Gallic people of Aremorica

The Lemovices were a Gallic people of Armorica, on the Atlantic seaboard of western Gaul, known only from the account of the Gallic Wars by Caesar. Caesar lists them among the Armorican peoples levied for the army raised to relieve the Roman siege of Alesia in 52 BC. Their seat cannot be located, and they are not recorded after 52 BC. They bore the same name as the larger Lemovices of Limousin. Whether both mentions of Lemovices denote a single people settled in two places or two distinct peoples has been debated.

== Name ==
Caesar names them, as Lemovices, among the Armorican seaboard peoples in his narrative of the events of 52 BC. They bear the same name as the Lemovices of Limousin, whose civitas lay in the western Massif Central.

The Gaulish ethnonym *Lemouices means 'those who vanquish by the elm', probably in reference to the wood from which were made their spears or bows. It derives from the stem Celtic lēmo-, meaning 'elm', attached to the suffix -uices ('victors').

== Identification ==
Whether a distinct Armorican people of this name existed is disputed. In his account of the revolt of 52 BC, Caesar uses the name both for the inland people of the Limousin region and, in his roll of the Armorican seaboard peoples, for a group placed on the Atlantic coast.

Venceslas Kruta gives two different readings. In his entry on the people, he treats the name as that of a single people whom Caesar may have listed by mistake among the Armorican peoples. In his entry on Armorica, he allows that it may instead be a small people homonymous with the Lemovices of Limousin. Jean-Michel Desbordes supposed one people of common origin settled in two places, comparing them to the Bituriges Cubi of Berry and the Bituriges Vivisci of the Bordelais. On this view, one branch may have remained on the western plateaux of the Massif Central, while the other may have moved to the Atlantic coast. Robert Bedon, by contrast, takes them to be two distinct peoples, identifying the inland Lemovices with three mentions by Caesar, and the seaboard group with two mentions.

== Geography ==
Caesar counts the Armorican Lemovices among the peoples of the Atlantic seaboard of Armorica, which in his day reached beyond the Breton peninsula to take in part of Normandy, including the Cotentin.

No source allows the seat of the Lemovices to be fixed within this area. Maximin Deloche proposed in 1857 that they occupied the whole region south-west of the Sèvre Nantaise, extending southwards as far as Les Sables-d'Olonne et L'Aiguillon, with a corridor linking them to Limousin; Robert Bedon regards this reconstruction as highly excessive.

== History ==
During the Gallic Wars, the Gallic leaders raised a force to relieve the siege of Alesia in 52 BC. They called on the Armorican peoples for twenty thousand men collectively, listing the Lemovices among them.

The share of the Lemovices in this levy is unknown. Robert Bedon reckons it at a few thousand men, or perhaps only a few hundred. After 52 BC the Armorican Lemovices are not mentioned again by any ancient author, and no inscription or other source records them.
