= Saint-Denis-des-Murs =

- Commune
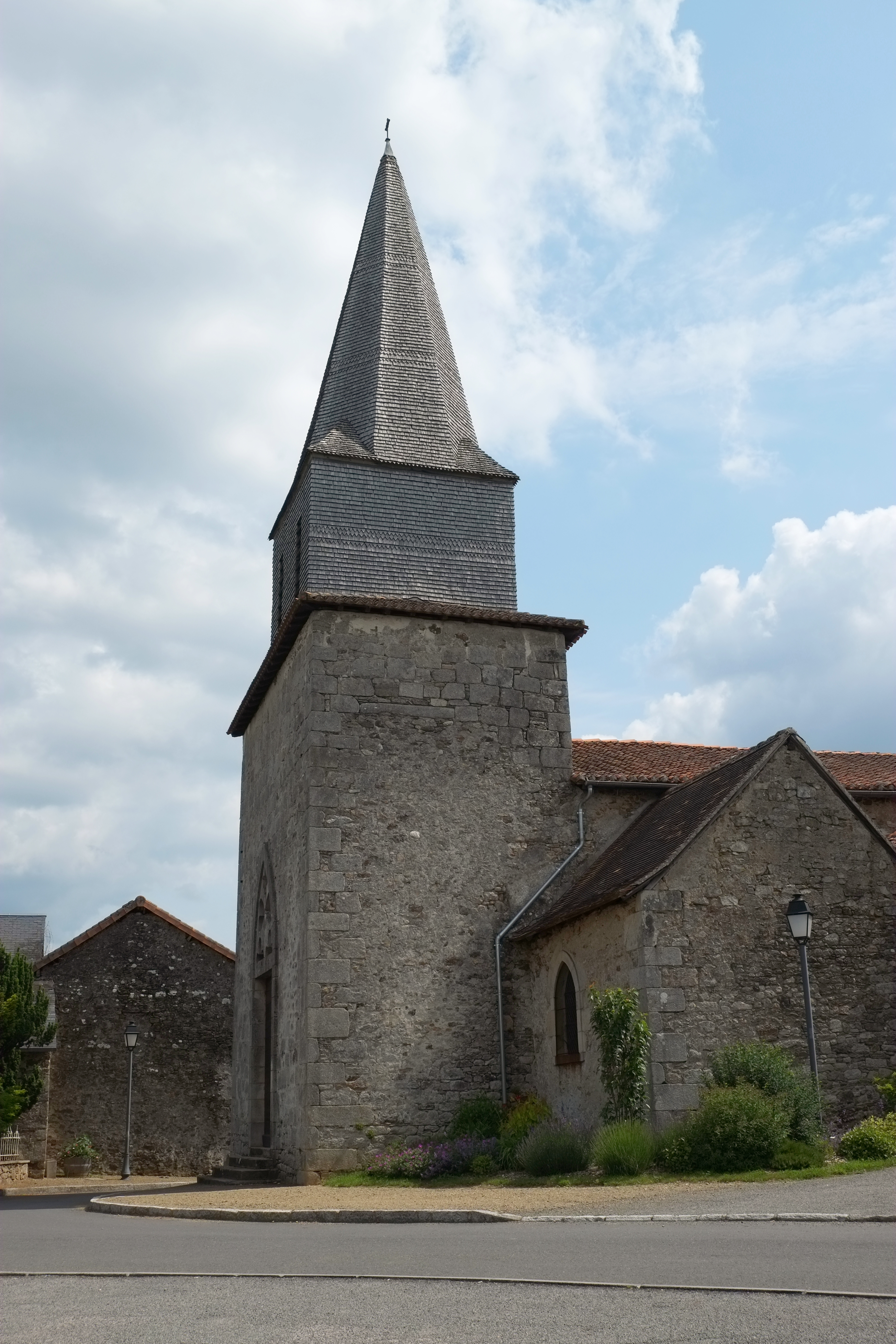
- The church of Saint-Denis, in Saint-Denis-des-Murs
- Location of Saint-Denis-des-Murs
- Location within France Location within Nouvelle-Aquitaine
- Coordinates: 45°47′09″N 1°32′43″E
- Country: France
- Region: Nouvelle-Aquitaine
- Department: Haute-Vienne
- Arrondissement: Limoges
- Canton: Saint-Léonard-de-Noblat
- Intercommunality: Noblat

Government
  - Mayor (2020–2026): Guy Touzet
- Area^{1}: 23.81 km^{2} (9.19 sq mi)
- Highest elevation: 479 m (1,572 ft)
- Lowest elevation: 270 m (890 ft)
- Population (2023): 545
  - Density: 22.9/km^{2} (59.3/sq mi)
- Time zone: UTC+01:00 (CET)
  - Summer (DST): UTC+02:00 (CEST)
- INSEE/Postal code: 87142 /87400
- ^{1} French Land Register data, which excludes lakes, ponds, glaciers > 1 km^{2} (0.386 sq mi or 247 acres) and river estuaries.

Saint-Denis-des-Murs (French pronunciation: [sɛ̃ dəni de myʁ]; Occitan: Sent Deunis) is a commune in the Haute-Vienne department in the Nouvelle-Aquitaine region in west-central France. It is situated in the Limousin region (now part of the Nouvelle-Aquitaine region), in the southern-centre of France at 24 kilometres from Limoges, the department capital (general information: Saint-Denis-Des-Murs is 347 kilometres from Paris).

Popular places to visit nearby include Saint-Leonard-de-Noblat at 7 km and Pierre-Buffiere at 17 km.

== See also ==
- Communes of the Haute-Vienne department
- Saint-Léonard-de-Noblat
