= La Geneytouse =

- Commune
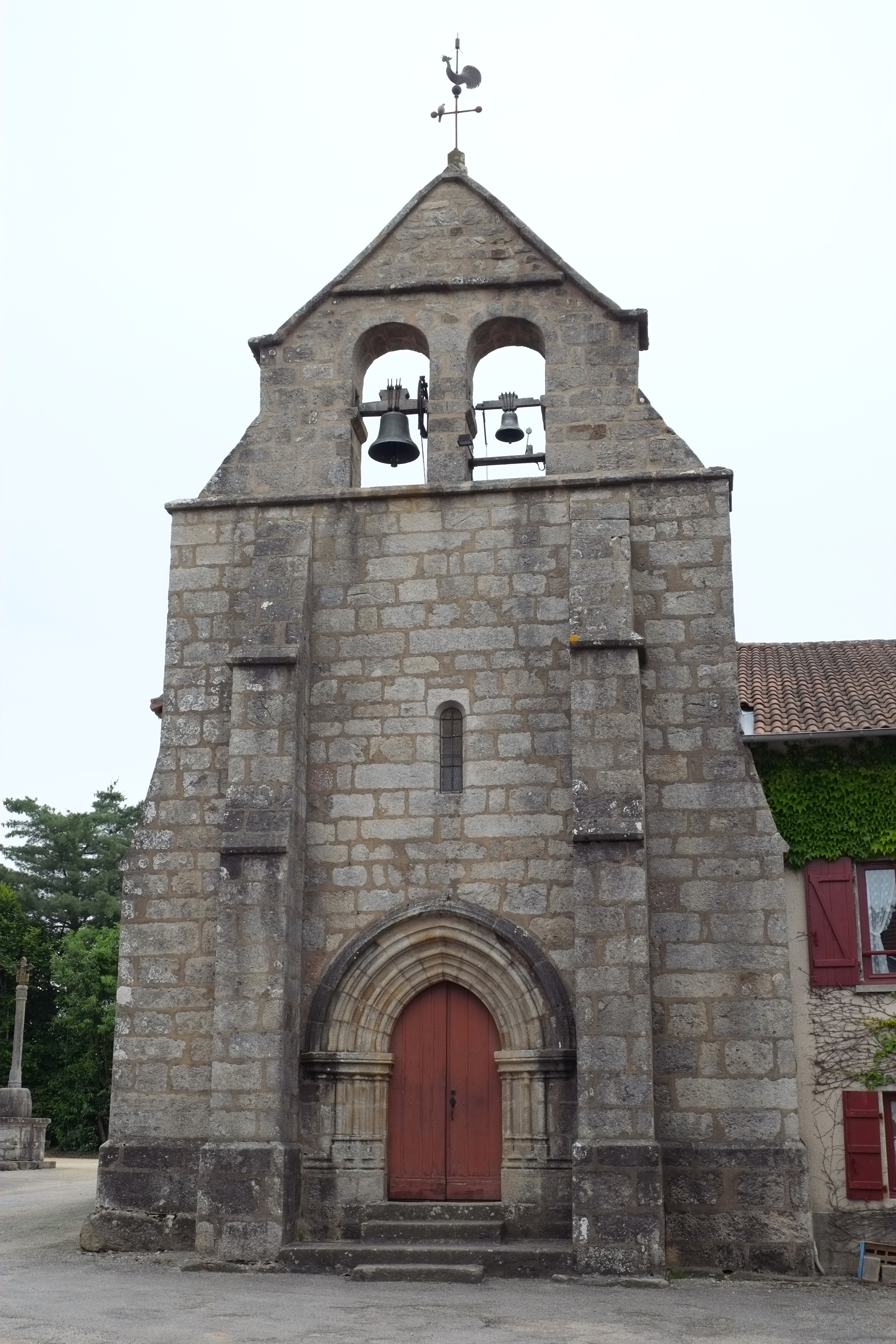
- The church in La Geneytouse
- Location of La Geneytouse
- Location within France Location within Nouvelle-Aquitaine
- Coordinates: 45°47′09″N 1°28′05″E
- Country: France
- Region: Nouvelle-Aquitaine
- Department: Haute-Vienne
- Arrondissement: Limoges
- Canton: Saint-Léonard-de-Noblat
- Intercommunality: Noblat

Government
  - Mayor (2020–2026): Alain Faucher
- Area^{1}: 19.35 km^{2} (7.47 sq mi)
- Highest elevation: 484 m (1,588 ft)
- Lowest elevation: 335 m (1,099 ft)
- Population (2023): 986
  - Density: 51.0/km^{2} (132/sq mi)
- Time zone: UTC+01:00 (CET)
  - Summer (DST): UTC+02:00 (CEST)
- INSEE/Postal code: 87070 /87400
- ^{1} French Land Register data, which excludes lakes, ponds, glaciers > 1 km^{2} (0.386 sq mi or 247 acres) and river estuaries.

La Geneytouse (French pronunciation: [la ʒənetuz]; Occitan: La Janestosa) is a commune in the Haute-Vienne department in the Nouvelle-Aquitaine region in west-central France.

Inhabitants are known as Geneytousois.

== See also ==
- Communes of the Haute-Vienne department
