= Eybouleuf =

- Commune
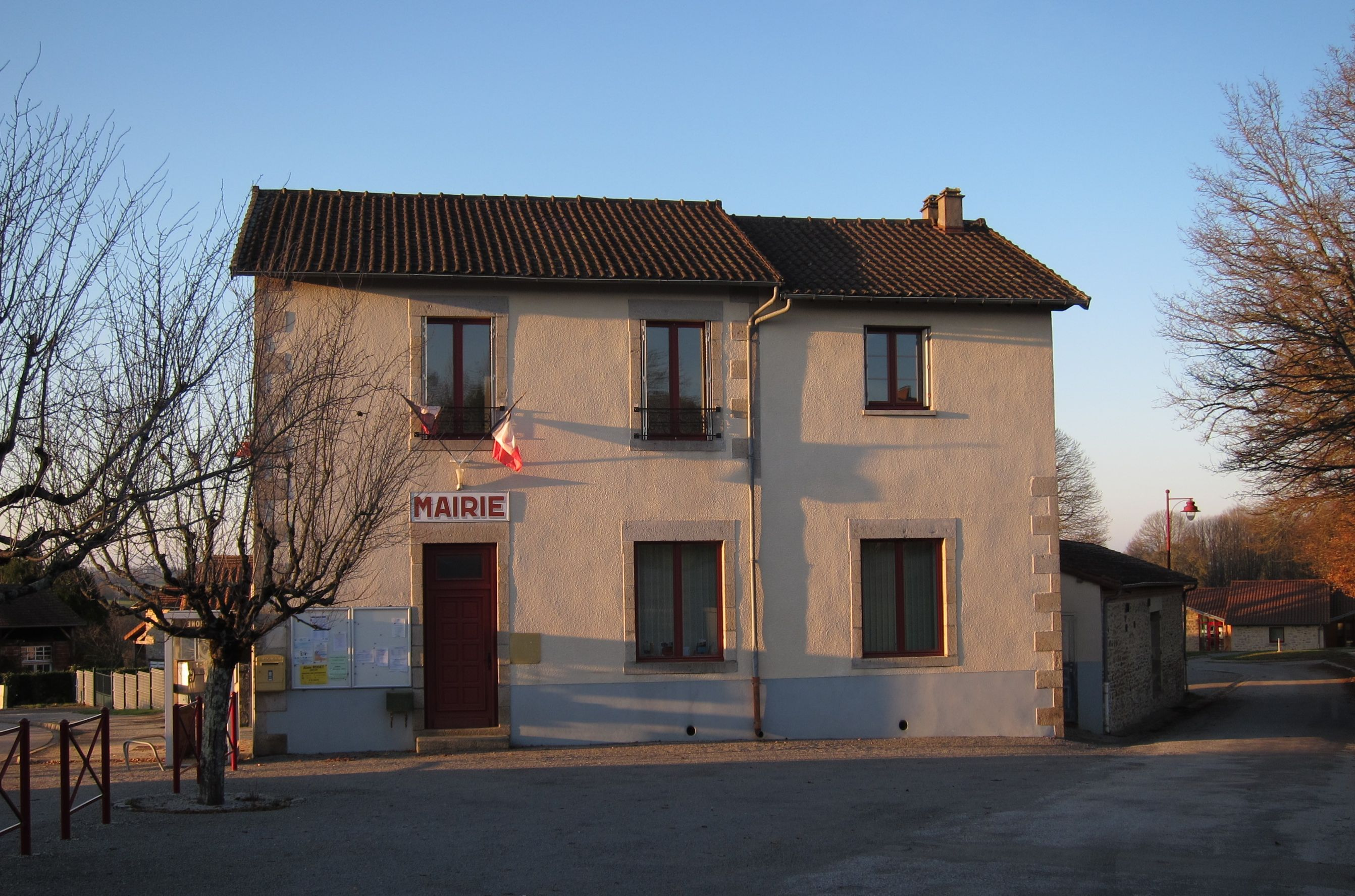
- The town hall in Eybouleuf
- Location of Eybouleuf
- Location within France Location within Nouvelle-Aquitaine
- Coordinates: 45°47′46″N 1°28′59″E
- Country: France
- Region: Nouvelle-Aquitaine
- Department: Haute-Vienne
- Arrondissement: Limoges
- Canton: Saint-Léonard-de-Noblat
- Intercommunality: Noblat

Government
  - Mayor (2020–2026): Sébastien Vincent
- Area^{1}: 10.83 km^{2} (4.18 sq mi)
- Highest elevation: 433 m (1,421 ft)
- Lowest elevation: 270 m (890 ft)
- Population (2023): 463
  - Density: 42.8/km^{2} (111/sq mi)
- Time zone: UTC+01:00 (CET)
  - Summer (DST): UTC+02:00 (CEST)
- INSEE/Postal code: 87062 /87400
- ^{1} French Land Register data, which excludes lakes, ponds, glaciers > 1 km^{2} (0.386 sq mi or 247 acres) and river estuaries.

Eybouleuf (Occitan: Esboleu) is a commune in the Haute-Vienne department in the Nouvelle-Aquitaine region in western France.

Inhabitants are known as Saccas.

== See also ==
- Communes of the Haute-Vienne department
