= Clémentine Jouassain =

French actress (1829–1902)

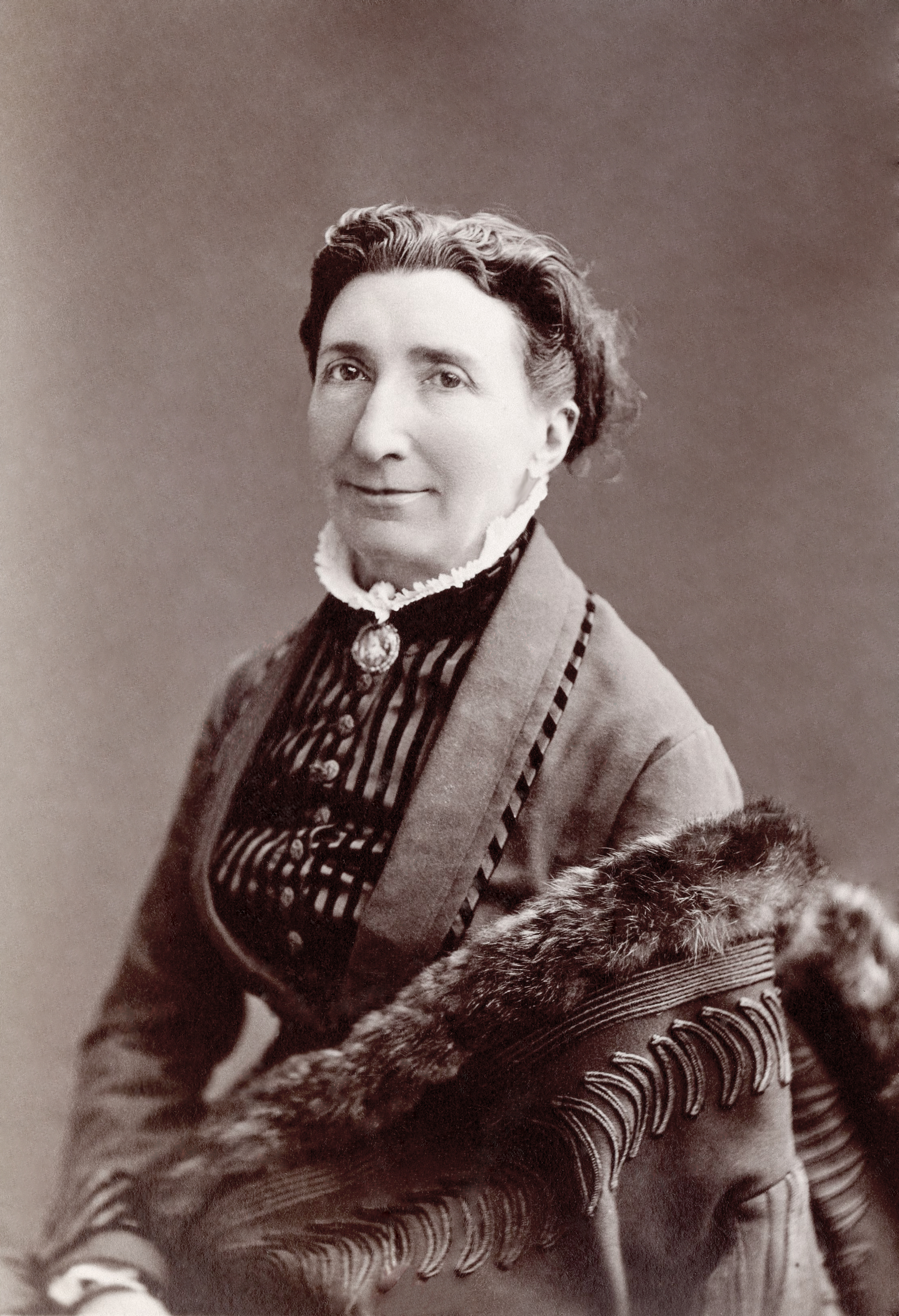
- Clémentine Jouassain as photographed by Félix Nadar in about 1873
- Born: Catherine-Julie-Clémentine Jouassain; 3 December 1829; Saint-Léonard-de-Noblat
- Died: 7 May 1902 (aged 72); Paris
- Occupation: Actress

Catherine-Julie-Clémentine Jouassain, baronne de Tournière (3 December 1829 – 7 May 1902) was a French actress, a societaire of the Comédie-Française.

== Early life ==
Joassain was born in Saint-Léonard-de-Noblat, near Limoges, the daughter of Léonard Jouassain and Marie Masrevery. Her father was a merchant. She studied at the Conservatoire in Paris, a student of Joseph Isidore Samson.

== Career ==
Jouassain debuted with the Comédie-Française in 1851, and became a societaire in 1863. She was called "reine des duègnes" (Queen of the Duennas), because she almost always played supporting characters; she was not considered to have the face or physique for leading roles. She was cast in plays by Jean Racine, Molière and Victor Hugo, and was credited as creating dozens of roles. In 1870, Joussain and three other actresses of the Comédie-Française, Madeleine Brohan, Marie Favart and Edile Riquier, announced that they were closing the theatre to open its space as "an ambulance" for treating French casualties during the Siege of Paris. "Excellent above all in Molière and Marivaux, and interesting in everything," commented a London newspaper in 1879, "she is one of the most original, most useful, and most laborious members of the company." She retired from the Comédie with a pension in 1887.

Jouassain donated art to the Musée d'Orsay.

== Personal life ==
In 1876, Joassain married a marine officer, Albert Edouard Olivier de Tournière, and became a baroness. She was a widow when she died in Paris in 1902, aged 72 years, after injuries sustained in a street accident with a bicycle.
