= Saint-Martin-Terressus =

- Commune
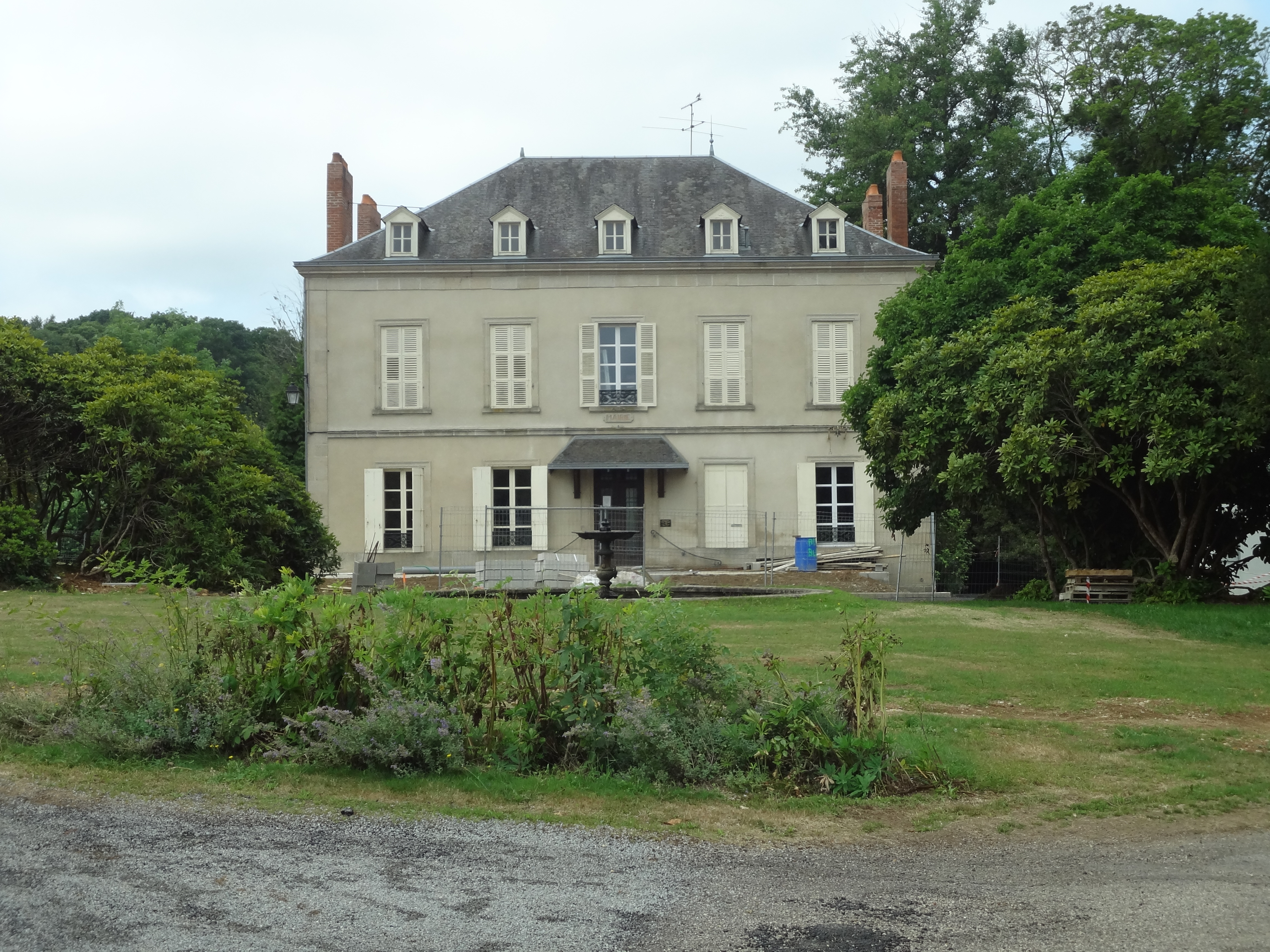
- The town hall in Saint-Martin-Terressus
- Location of Saint-Martin-Terressus
- Location within France Location within Nouvelle-Aquitaine
- Coordinates: 45°55′12″N 1°26′38″E
- Country: France
- Region: Nouvelle-Aquitaine
- Department: Haute-Vienne
- Arrondissement: Limoges
- Canton: Saint-Léonard-de-Noblat
- Intercommunality: Noblat

Government
  - Mayor (2020–2026): Jean-Pierre Estrade
- Area^{1}: 23.53 km^{2} (9.08 sq mi)
- Highest elevation: 445 m (1,460 ft)
- Lowest elevation: 242 m (794 ft)
- Population (2023): 593
  - Density: 25.2/km^{2} (65.3/sq mi)
- Time zone: UTC+01:00 (CET)
  - Summer (DST): UTC+02:00 (CEST)
- INSEE/Postal code: 87167 /87400
- ^{1} French Land Register data, which excludes lakes, ponds, glaciers > 1 km^{2} (0.386 sq mi or 247 acres) and river estuaries.

Saint-Martin-Terressus (French pronunciation: [sɛ̃ maʁtɛ̃ tɛʁɛsy]; Occitan: Sent Martin Tarrassos) is a commune in the Haute-Vienne department in the Nouvelle-Aquitaine region in west-central France.

== See also ==
- Communes of the Haute-Vienne department
