= Champnétery =

- Commune
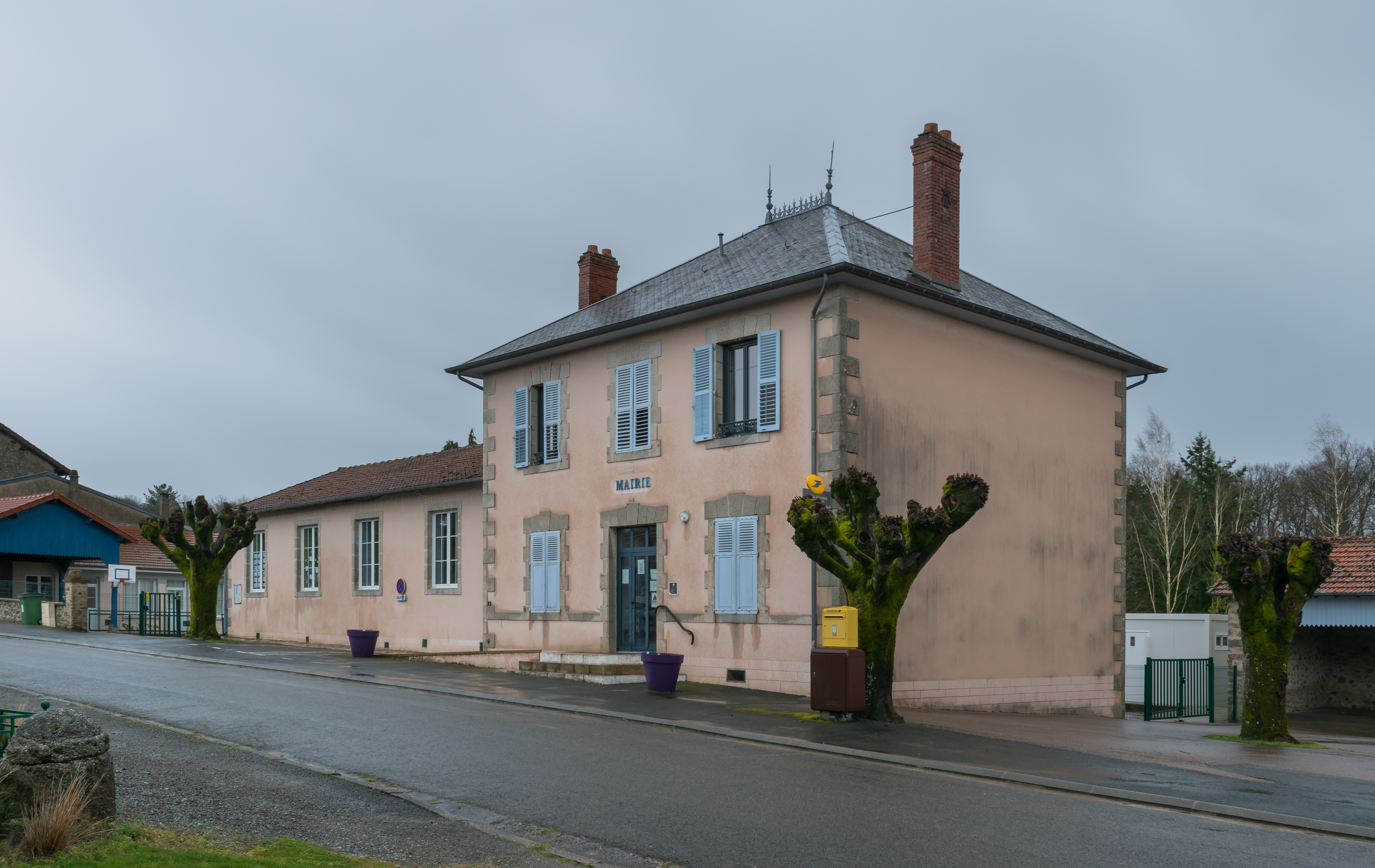
- Town hall of Champnétery

- Coat of arms
- Location of Champnétery
- Location within France Location within Nouvelle-Aquitaine
- Coordinates: 45°49′58″N 1°34′22″E
- Country: France
- Region: Nouvelle-Aquitaine
- Department: Haute-Vienne
- Arrondissement: Limoges
- Canton: Saint-Léonard-de-Noblat
- Intercommunality: Noblat

Government
  - Mayor (2020–2026): Michaël Kapstein
- Area^{1}: 30.60 km^{2} (11.81 sq mi)
- Highest elevation: 531 m (1,742 ft)
- Lowest elevation: 289 m (948 ft)
- Population (2023): 512
  - Density: 16.7/km^{2} (43.3/sq mi)
- Time zone: UTC+01:00 (CET)
  - Summer (DST): UTC+02:00 (CEST)
- INSEE/Postal code: 87035 /87400
- ^{1} French Land Register data, which excludes lakes, ponds, glaciers > 1 km^{2} (0.386 sq mi or 247 acres) and river estuaries.

Champnétery (French pronunciation: [ʃɑ̃netʁi]; Occitan: Champ Menesterí) is a commune in the Haute-Vienne department in the Nouvelle-Aquitaine region in western France.

== See also ==
- Communes of the Haute-Vienne department
