= Pontarion =

Commune in Nouvelle-Aquitaine, France

- Commune
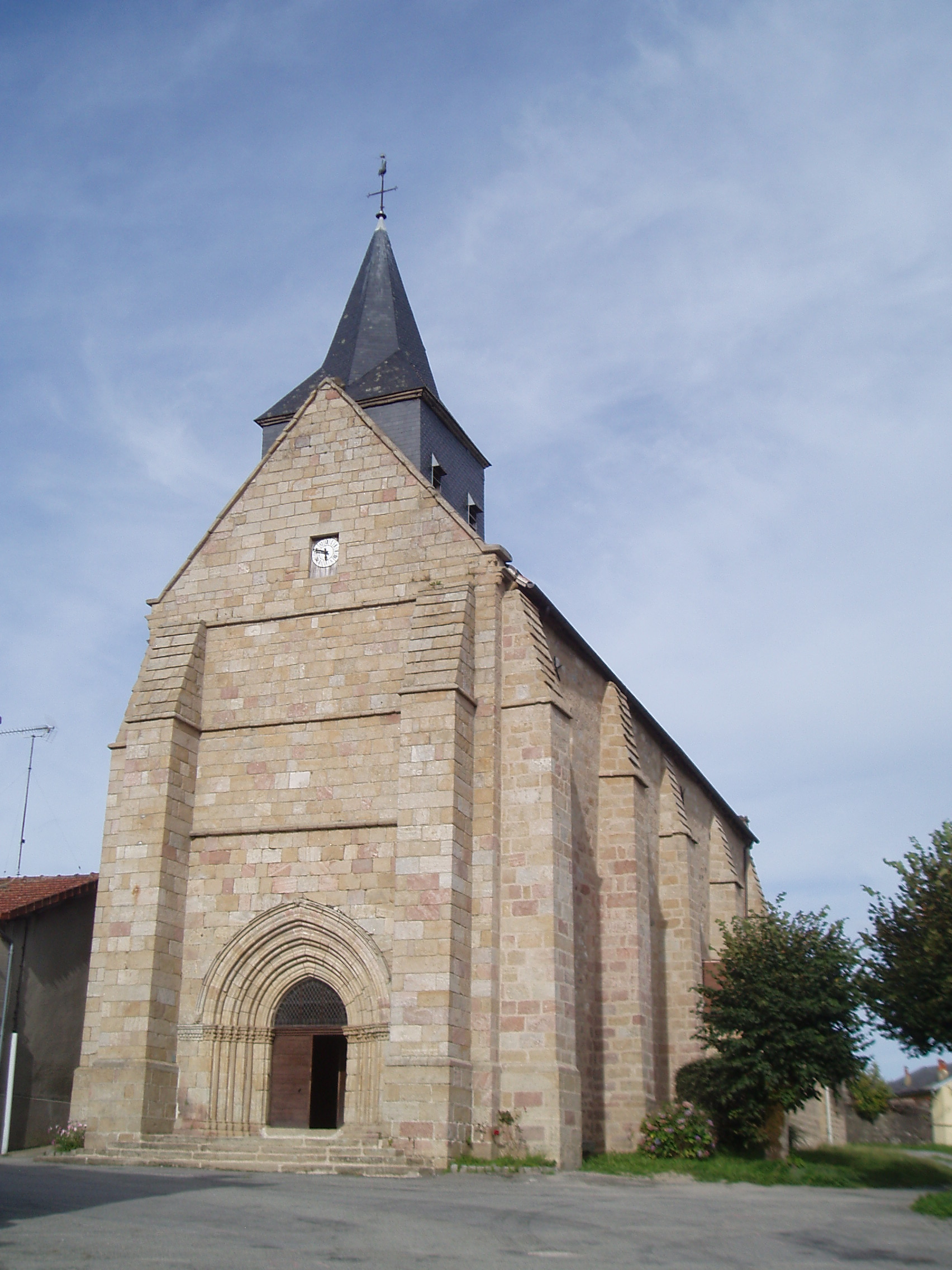
- The church of Saint-Blaise, in Pontarion

- Coat of arms
- Location of Pontarion
- Location within France Location within Nouvelle-Aquitaine
- Coordinates: 45°59′54″N 1°51′02″E
- Country: France
- Region: Nouvelle-Aquitaine
- Department: Creuse
- Arrondissement: Guéret
- Canton: Ahun
- Intercommunality: CC Creuse Sud Ouest

Government
  - Mayor (2020–2026): Jean-Claude Moreau
- Area^{1}: 5.25 km^{2} (2.03 sq mi)
- Elevation: 443 m (1,453 ft)
- Highest elevation: 561 m (1,841 ft)
- Lowest elevation: 435 m (1,427 ft)
- Population (2023): 357
  - Density: 68.0/km^{2} (176/sq mi)
- Time zone: UTC+01:00 (CET)
  - Summer (DST): UTC+02:00 (CEST)
- INSEE/Postal code: 23155 /23250
- ^{1} French Land Register data, which excludes lakes, ponds, glaciers > 1 km^{2} (0.386 sq mi or 247 acres) and river estuaries.

Pontarion (French pronunciation: [pɔ̃taʁjɔ̃]; Occitan: Pont a Riom) is a commune in the Creuse department in the Nouvelle-Aquitaine region in central France.

== Geography ==
A farming village situated by the banks of the river Thaurion, some 12 miles (19 km) south of Guéret, at the junction of the D13, D10, D940 and the D941.

== Population ==
Historical population
Year	Pop.	±% p.a.
1968	419	—
1975	388	−1.09%
1982	374	−0.52%
1990	350	−0.83%
1999	379	+0.89%
2007	360	−0.64%
2012	362	+0.11%
2017	365	+0.17%
2023	357	−0.37%
Source: INSEE

== Sights ==
- The church of St. Blaise, dating from the thirteenth century.
- The fifteenth-century château.
- The Maurice Lecante museum.

== See also ==
- Communes of the Creuse department
