= Canton of Saint-Léonard-de-Noblat =

Coordinates: 45.83833°N 1.49139°E

Saint-Léonard-de-Noblat
- Canton
- Interactive map of Saint-Léonard-de-Noblat
- Country: France
- Region: Nouvelle-Aquitaine
- Department: Haute-Vienne
- No. of communes: {{{nbcomm}}}

Government
  - Representatives (2021–2028): Christelle Aupetit-Berthelemot and Jean-Claude Leblois
- Area: 325.88 km^{2} (125.82 sq mi)
- Population (2023): 16,593
  - Density: 50.918/km^{2} (131.88/sq mi)
- INSEE code: 87 20

The canton of Saint-Léonard-de-Noblat is a French canton located in the department of Haute-Vienne and in the region of Nouvelle-Aquitaine.

== Geography ==
This canton is organized around Saint-Léonard-de-Noblat in the Arrondissement of Limoges. Its altitude is between 235 meters in (Royères) and 586 meters in (Sauviat-sur-Vige) with an average of 373 m.

== Administration ==
In 2015, Christelle Aupetit-Berthelemot and Jean-Claude Leblois won the election.

== Composition ==
Since the French canton reorganisation which came into effect in March 2015, the communes of the canton of Saint-Léonard-de-Noblat are:

- Aureil
- Champnétery
- Le Châtenet-en-Dognon
- Eybouleuf
- La Geneytouse
- Moissannes
- Royères
- Saint-Denis-des-Murs
- Saint-Just-le-Martel
- Saint-Léonard-de-Noblat
- Saint-Martin-Terressus
- Saint-Priest-Taurion
- Sauviat-sur-Vige

== Demographics ==
Historical population
Year	Pop.	±% p.a.
2013	16,613	—
2018	16,627	+0.02%
Source: INSEE

== See also ==
- Cantons of the Haute-Vienne department
- Arrondissement of Limoges
