= Saint-Léonard-de-Noblat =

Saint-Léonard-de-Noblat Sent Liunard (Occitan)
- Commune
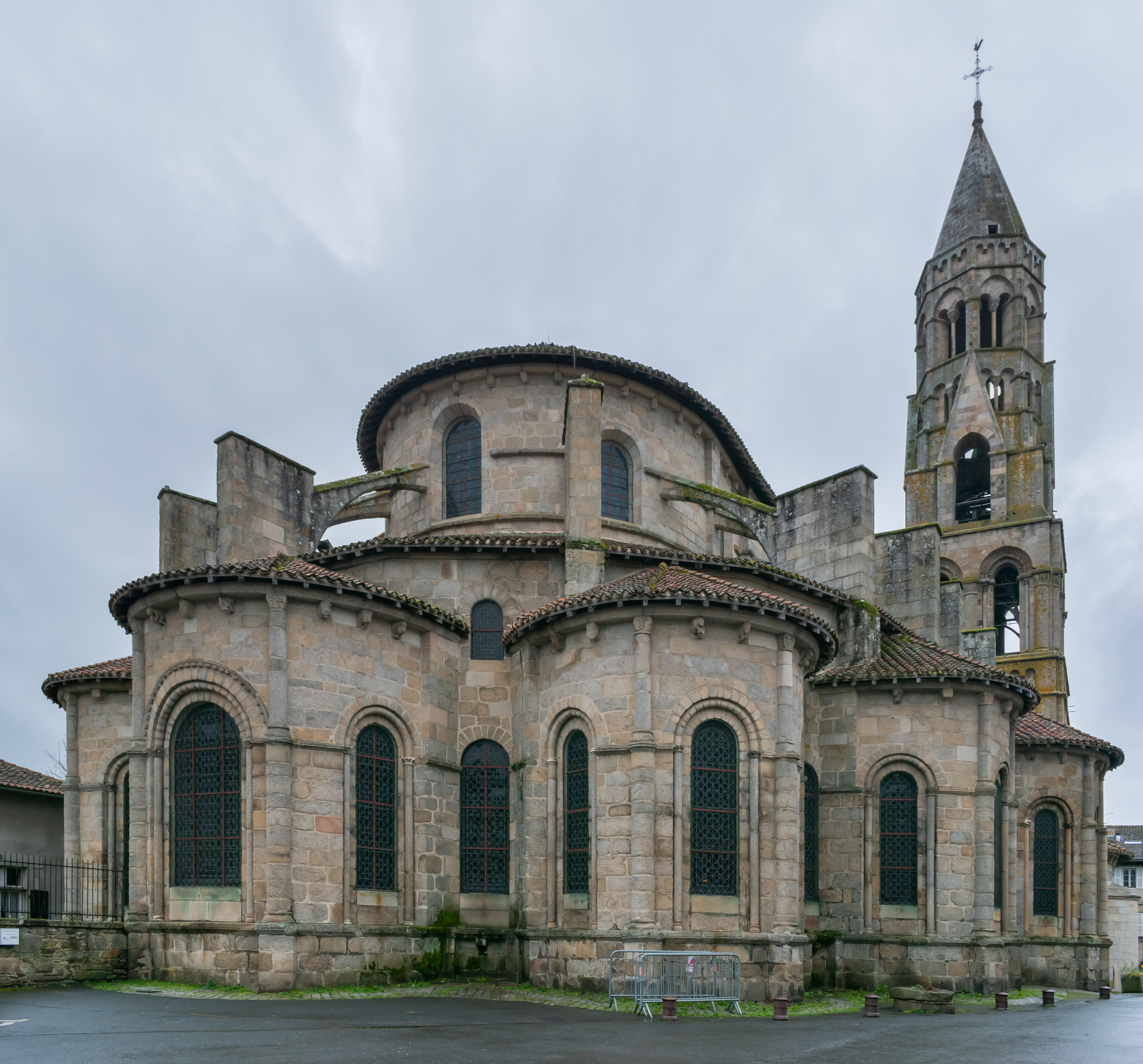
- Saint-Léonard Church

- Coat of arms
- Location of Saint-Léonard-de-Noblat
- Location within France Location within Nouvelle-Aquitaine
- Coordinates: 45°50′18″N 1°29′29″E
- Country: France
- Region: Nouvelle-Aquitaine
- Department: Haute-Vienne
- Arrondissement: Limoges
- Canton: Saint-Léonard-de-Noblat
- Intercommunality: CC de Noblat

Government
  - Mayor (2020–2026): Alain Darbon
- Area^{1}: 55.59 km^{2} (21.46 sq mi)
- Elevation: 330 m (1,080 ft)
- Highest elevation: 444 m (1,457 ft)
- Lowest elevation: 250 m (820 ft)
- Population (2023): 4,366
  - Density: 78.54/km^{2} (203.4/sq mi)
- Demonym: Miaulétous
- Time zone: UTC+01:00 (CET)
  - Summer (DST): UTC+02:00 (CEST)
- INSEE/Postal code: 87161 /87400
- Website: www.ville-saint-leonard.fr
- ^{1} French Land Register data, which excludes lakes, ponds, glaciers > 1 km^{2} (0.386 sq mi or 247 acres) and river estuaries.

Saint-Léonard-de-Noblat (French pronunciation: [sɛ̃leɔnaʁ də nɔbla]; Occitan: Sent Liunard, [sɛ̃ ʎo'nar], alternatively Sent Liunard de Noblac), often simply referred to as Saint-Léonard, is a commune in the Haute-Vienne department in the Nouvelle-Aquitaine region in west-central France, on a hill above the river Vienne. It is named after the 6th-century Saint Leonard of Noblac.

The commune of Saint-Léonard-de-Noblat covers the town of Saint-Léonard-de-Noblat and a number of small villages and hamlets, including Lajoumard.

== History ==
Amid the French Revolution, the town was renamed Léonard-sur-Vienne (lit. "Leonard-on-Vienne").

== Population ==
Inhabitants are known as Miaulétous (masculine) and Miaulétouses (feminine) in French.

Historical population
| Year | Pop. | ±% p.a. |
|---|---|---|
| 1968 | 5,709 | — |
| 1975 | 5,457 | −0.64% |
| 1982 | 5,275 | −0.48% |
| 1990 | 5,024 | −0.61% |
| 1999 | 4,764 | −0.59% |
| 2007 | 4,650 | −0.30% |
| 2012 | 4,624 | −0.11% |
| 2017 | 4,554 | −0.30% |
| 2023 | 4,366 | −0.70% |
Source: INSEE

== Sights ==
Saint-Léonard-de-Noblat is one of the UNESCO World Heritage Sites connected with the routes to Santiago de Compostela. It retains the Romanesque collegial church and its belltower, 52 m (171 ft) tall. Dating partly from the 11th century, the church is a listed historic monument. Its old houses follow a medieval street pattern, with many streets converging in a public space by the former abbey church. In the 19th century, a papermill and a porcelain manufactory were added to its commerce. The place also attracts visitors as an overnight stop on the Tour de France. The town is known for its native son, the scientist Joseph Louis Gay-Lussac (1778–1850); there is a small museum in his honor.

== Notable people ==
Notable people linked to Saint-Léonard-de-Noblat include:

- Saint-Léonard-de-Noblat was the hometown of the chemist and physicist Joseph Louis Gay-Lussac (1778–1850).
- Adrien Pressemane (1879–1929), a porcelain painter, lived in the town and represented the surrounding district in parliament.
- Raymond Poulidor (1936–2019), considered by some as the most popular racing cyclist in France, lived in the town. He was known as "the eternal second" of the Tour de France after repeatedly losing, often against Jacques Anquetil, who won five times. Poulidor later competed against Eddy Merckx, who also won five times. Poulidor's best victory was in Milan–San Remo.
- Serge Gainsbourg, born Lucien Ginsburg (1928–1991), took refuge a few months in 1944 to the local high school, thereby escaping the persecution of Jews (his parents had immigrated from Crimea). The local school principal, Louis Chazelas, who also aided other Jews during the war, told him to present himself as the son of lumberjacks. A comprehensive article on this stay appears in the journal Memory of Here (No. 3).
- Gilles Deleuze (1925–1995), French philosopher, lived and was buried there.
- Jean-Joseph Sanfourche (1929-2010), painter
- Mario David, stage name of Jacques Paul Jules Marie David (1927–1996), French actor, was at school there.
- Georges-Emmanuel Clancier (1914–2018), French writer and poet. In Saint-Léonard-de-Noblat, he met Raymond Queneau and Michel Leiris.
- Daniel-Henri Kahnweiler (1884–1979), German writer and collector, who promoted the Cubist movement and discovered, among others, Picasso and Braque, took refuge in Saint-Léonard during the war.
- Philippe de Vomécourt (1902–1964), French Resistance and Special Operations Executive (SOE) agent in World War II. His home was near Noblat.
- Clémentine Jouassain (1829–1902), actress of the Comédie-Française, born in Saint-Léonard-de-Noblat.

== See also ==
- Communes of the Haute-Vienne department
