= Sauviat-sur-Vige =

- Commune
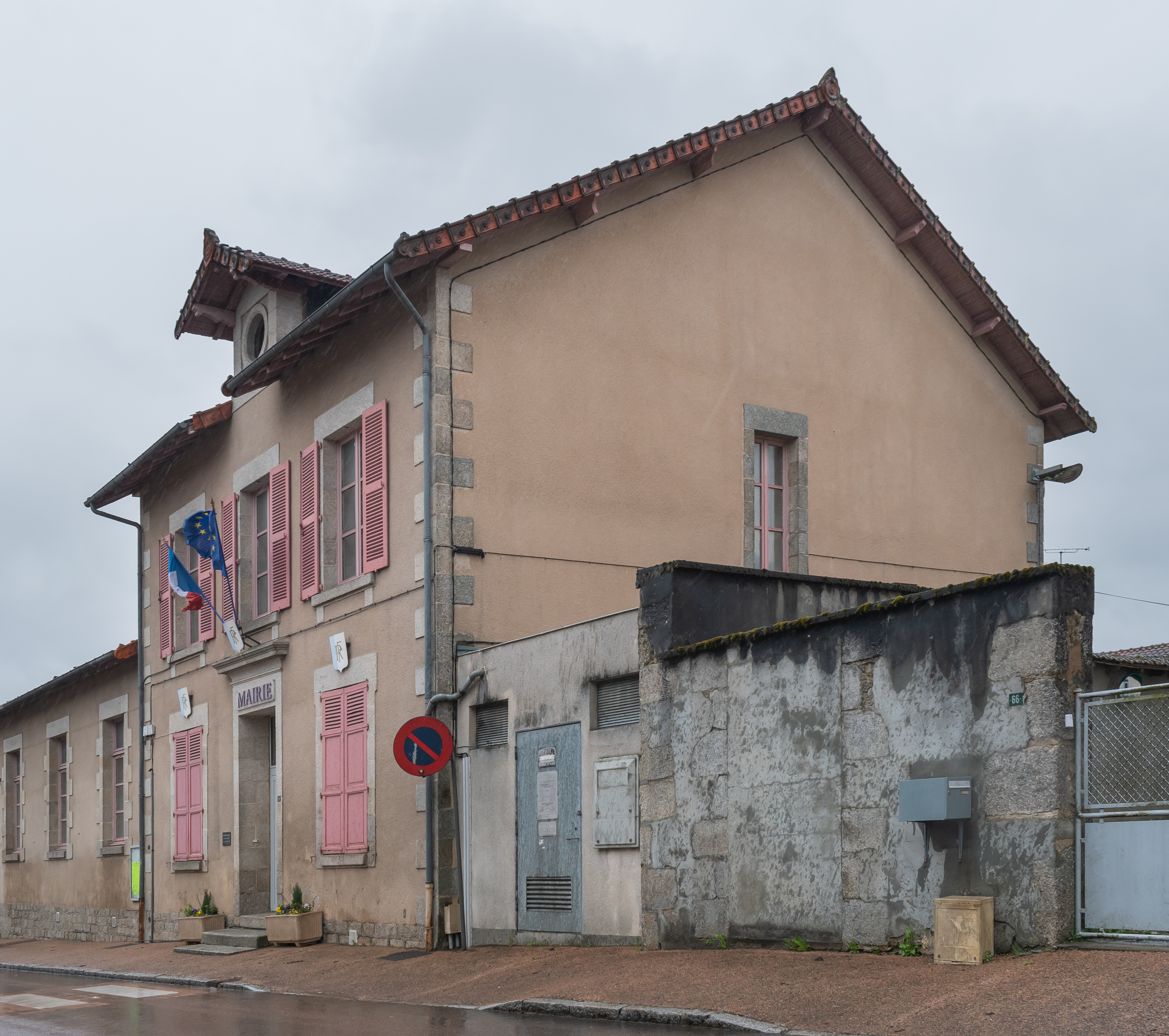
- Town hall of Sauviat-sur-Vige
- Location of Sauviat-sur-Vige
- Location within France Location within Nouvelle-Aquitaine
- Coordinates: 45°54′27″N 1°36′30″E
- Country: France
- Region: Nouvelle-Aquitaine
- Department: Haute-Vienne
- Arrondissement: Limoges
- Canton: Saint-Léonard-de-Noblat
- Intercommunality: Noblat

Government
  - Mayor (2020–2026): Jean-Pierre Nexon
- Area^{1}: 30.85 km^{2} (11.91 sq mi)
- Highest elevation: 586 m (1,923 ft)
- Lowest elevation: 373 m (1,224 ft)
- Population (2023): 890
  - Density: 29/km^{2} (75/sq mi)
- Time zone: UTC+01:00 (CET)
  - Summer (DST): UTC+02:00 (CEST)
- INSEE/Postal code: 87190 /87400
- ^{1} French Land Register data, which excludes lakes, ponds, glaciers > 1 km^{2} (0.386 sq mi or 247 acres) and river estuaries.

Sauviat-sur-Vige (Occitan: Sauviac) is a commune in the Haute-Vienne department in the Nouvelle-Aquitaine region in west-central France.

Inhabitants are known as Sauvigeois.

== See also ==
- Communes of the Haute-Vienne department
