= Le Châtenet-en-Dognon =

- Commune
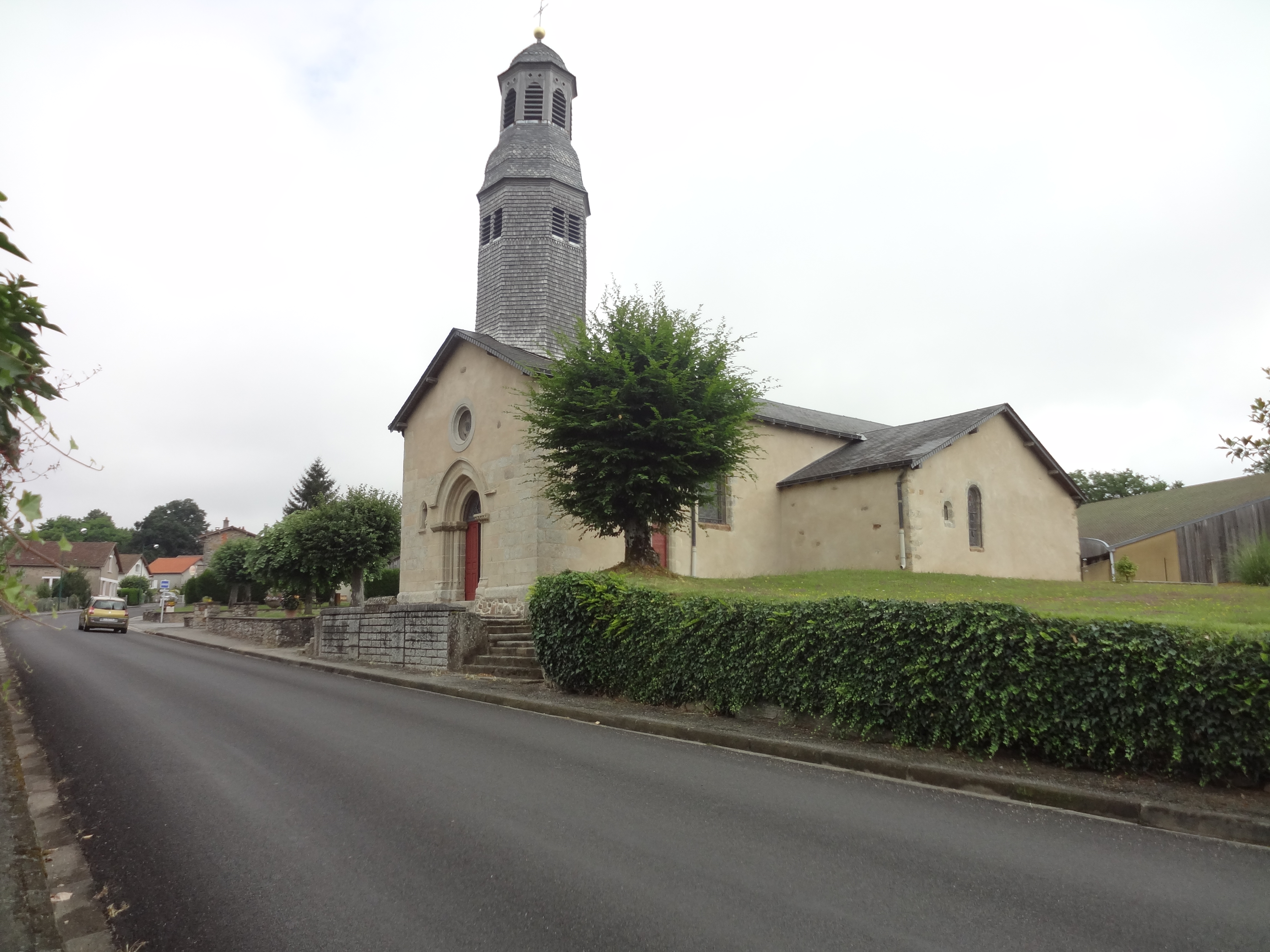
- The church in Le Châtenet-en-Dognon

- Coat of arms
- Location of Le Châtenet-en-Dognon
- Location within France Location within Nouvelle-Aquitaine
- Coordinates: 45°54′24″N 1°30′25″E
- Country: France
- Region: Nouvelle-Aquitaine
- Department: Haute-Vienne
- Arrondissement: Limoges
- Canton: Saint-Léonard-de-Noblat
- Intercommunality: Noblat

Government
  - Mayor (2020–2026): Hervé Valadas
- Area^{1}: 20.39 km^{2} (7.87 sq mi)
- Highest elevation: 457 m (1,499 ft)
- Lowest elevation: 271 m (889 ft)
- Population (2023): 407
  - Density: 20.0/km^{2} (51.7/sq mi)
- Time zone: UTC+01:00 (CET)
  - Summer (DST): UTC+02:00 (CEST)
- INSEE/Postal code: 87042 /87400
- ^{1} French Land Register data, which excludes lakes, ponds, glaciers > 1 km^{2} (0.386 sq mi or 247 acres) and river estuaries.

Le Châtenet-en-Dognon (French pronunciation: [lə ʃatnɛ ɑ̃ dɔɲɔ̃]; Occitan: Lo Chastanet) is a commune in the Haute-Vienne department in the Nouvelle-Aquitaine region in western France.

== See also ==
- Communes of the Haute-Vienne department
