= Limousin =

Region in southwest-central France

Limousin Lemosin (Occitan)
- Region of France
- Flag Coat of arms

- Coordinates: 45.68795°N 1.620483°E
- Country: France
- Dissolved: 2016-01-01
- Prefecture: Limoges
- Departments: 3: Corrèze (19); Creuse (23); Haute-Vienne (87)

Government
  - President: Gérard Vandenbroucke (PS)

Area INSEE
  - Total: 16,942 km^{2} (6,541 sq mi)

Population (2010-01-01)
  - Total: 742,770
  - Density: 43.842/km^{2} (113.55/sq mi)

GDP
  - Total: €23.258 billion (2024)
  - Per capita: €31,904 (2024)
- Time zone: UTC+01:00 (CET)
  - Summer (DST): UTC+02:00 (CEST)
- ISO 3166 code: FR-L
- NUTS Region: FR6
- Website: (in French)cr-limousin.fr

Limousin (French pronunciation: [limuzɛ̃]; Occitan: Lemosin [lemuˈzi]) is a former administrative region of southwest-central France. Named after the old province of Limousin, the administrative region was founded in 1960. It comprised three departments: Corrèze, Creuse, and Haute-Vienne. On 1 January 2016, it became part of the new administrative region of Nouvelle-Aquitaine.

Situated mostly in the west side of south-central French Massif Central, Limousin had (in 2010) 742,770 inhabitants spread out on nearly 17,000 km^{2} (6,600 square miles), making it the least populated region of metropolitan France.

Forming part of the southwest of the country, Limousin was bordered by the regions of Centre-Val de Loire to the north, Auvergne to the east, Midi-Pyrénées to the south, Aquitaine to the southwest, and Poitou-Charentes to the west. Limousin was also part of the larger historical Occitania region.

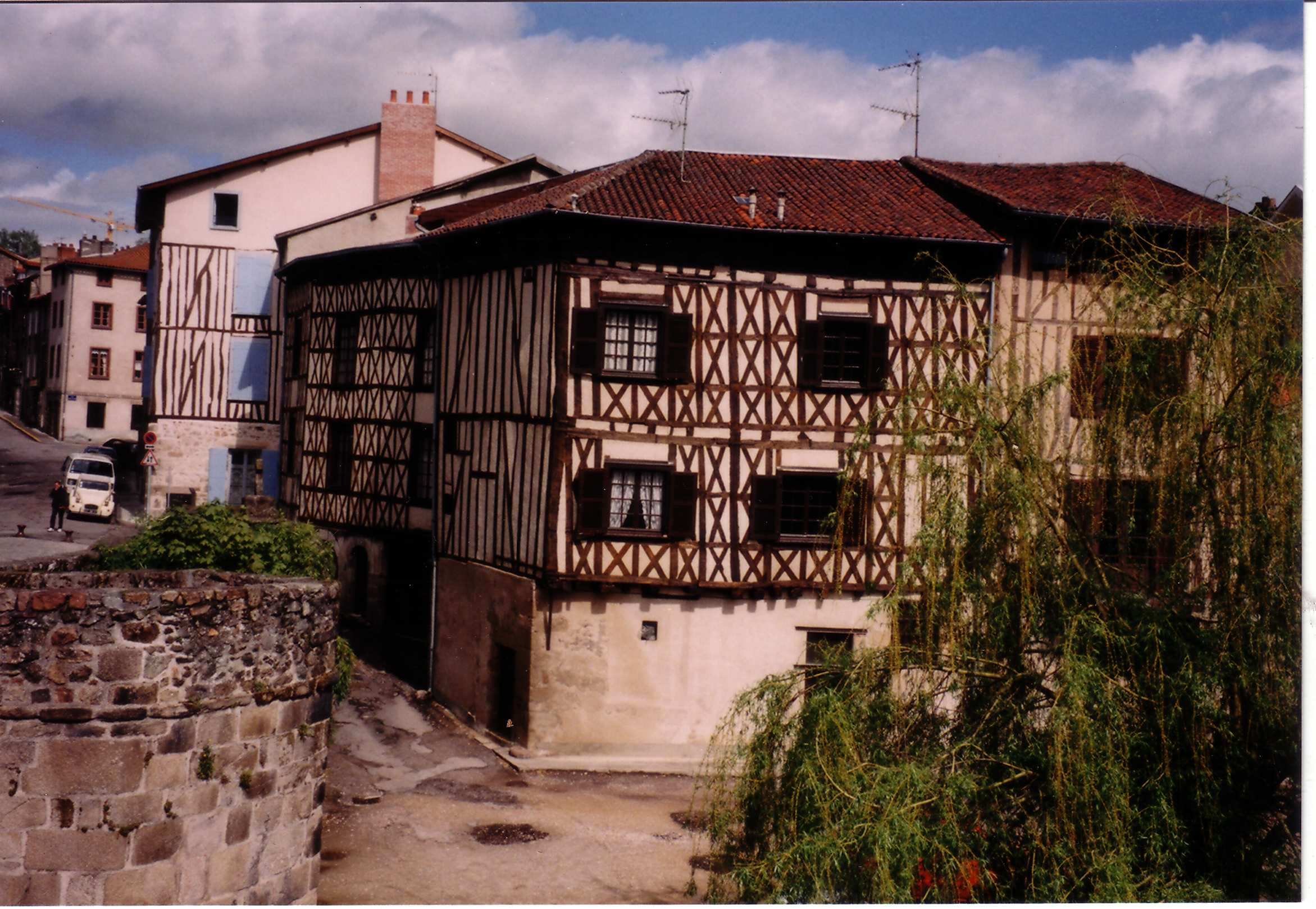
Limoges, half-timbered house by the bridge Saint Martial

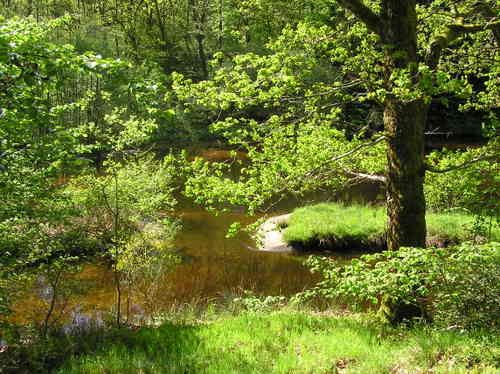
Small river in Creuse, Limousin

== History ==
Limousin was one of the traditional provinces of France. Its name derived from that of a Celtic tribe, the Lemovices, who had their capital at Saint-Denis-des-Murs and whose main sanctuary in 2004 was found in Tintignac, a site which became a major site for Celtic studies thanks to unique objects which were found – such as the carnyces, unique in the whole Celtic world.

Viscount Aimar V of Limoges (c. 1135 – c. 1199) was a notable ruler of the region.

== Population ==
The population of Limousin was aging and, until 1999, was declining. The department of Creuse had the oldest population of any in France. Between 1999 and 2004 the population of Limousin increased slightly, reversing a decline for the first time in decades.

== Major communities ==
- Brive-la-Gaillarde
- Guéret
- Limoges
- Panazol
- Saint-Junien
- Tulle
- Ussel

=== Language ===
Until the 1970s, Occitan was the primary language of rural areas. There remained several different Occitan dialects in use in Limousin, although their use was rapidly declining. These were:

- Limousin (Occitan: Lemosin) dialect
- Auvergnat (Occitan: Auvernhat) dialect in the East/North-East
- Languedocien (Occitan: Lengadocian) in the Southern fringe of Corrèze
- in the North, the Crescent transition area between Occitan and French is sometimes considered as a separate (basically Occitan) dialect called Marchois (Occitan: Marchés).

=== Transport ===
- The word limousine is derived from the name of the region. A particular type of carriage hood or roof physically resembled the raised hood of the cloak worn by the shepherds there.

== See also ==
- Limousin (province), former province of France under the Ancien Régime.
- Limousin (cattle), breed of beef cattle bred in the Limousin region.
- Limousin (dialect), Occitan dialect of the region.
- TER Limousin
