= Trois-Palis =

- Commune
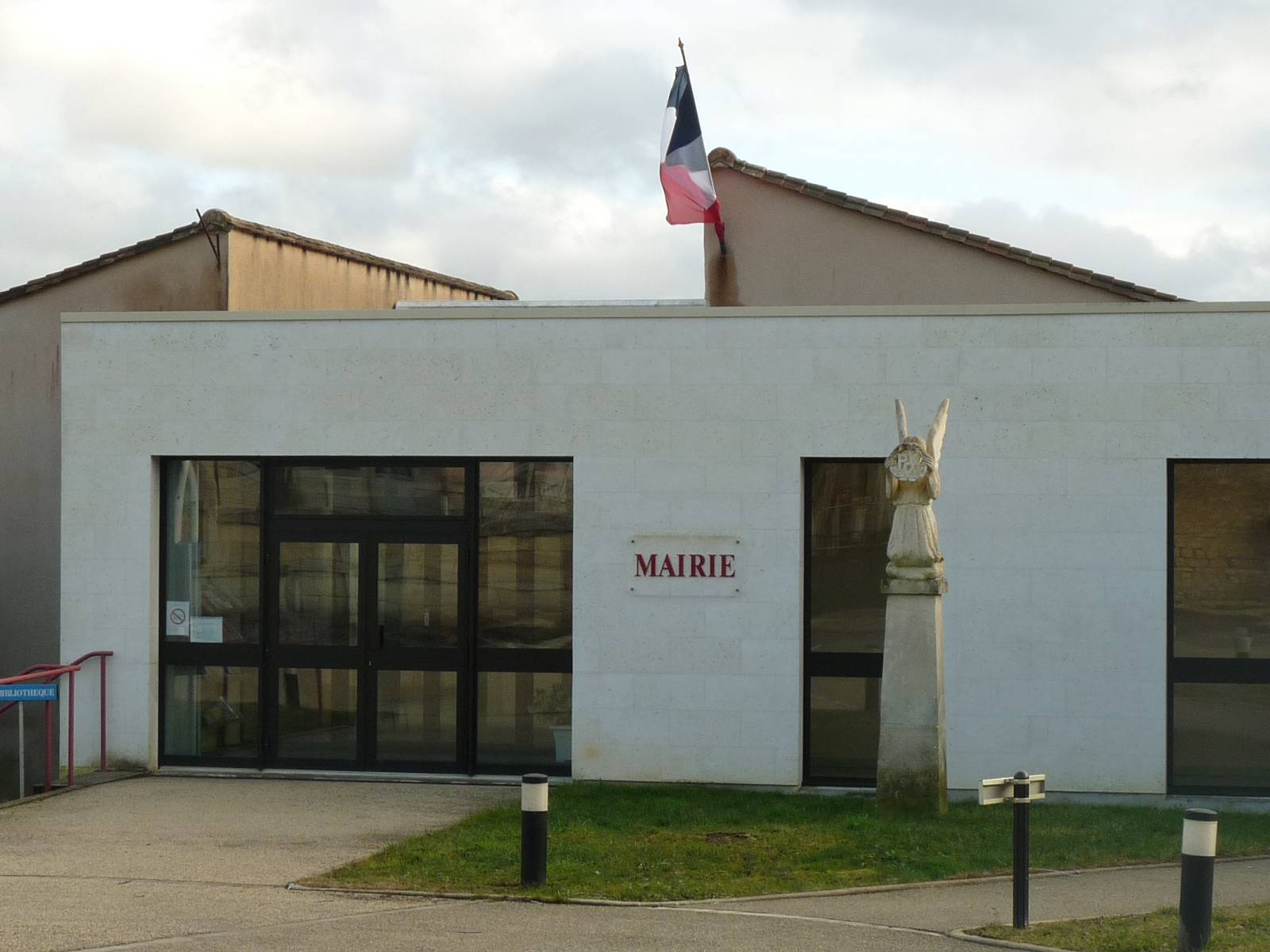
- The town hall in Trois-Palis

- Coat of arms
- Location of Trois-Palis
- Location within France Location within Nouvelle-Aquitaine
- Coordinates: 45°38′28″N 0°03′23″E
- Country: France
- Region: Nouvelle-Aquitaine
- Department: Charente
- Arrondissement: Angoulême
- Canton: Val de Nouère
- Intercommunality: Grand Angoulême

Government
  - Mayor (2020–2026): Denis Durocher
- Area^{1}: 4.22 km^{2} (1.63 sq mi)
- Elevation: 40 m (130 ft)
- Highest elevation: 92 m (302 ft)
- Lowest elevation: 22 m (72 ft)
- Population (2023): 944
  - Density: 224/km^{2} (579/sq mi)
- Time zone: UTC+01:00 (CET)
  - Summer (DST): UTC+02:00 (CEST)
- INSEE/Postal code: 16388 /16730
- ^{1} French Land Register data, which excludes lakes, ponds, glaciers > 1 km^{2} (0.386 sq mi or 247 acres) and river estuaries.

Trois-Palis (French pronunciation: [tʁwɑ pali]; literally "Three Palisades") is a commune in the Charente department of southwestern France.

== Geography ==
=== Location and access ===
Trois-Palis is a commune located 8 km west of Angoulême—forming part of the Angoulême urban area—in the Charente River valley, on the river's right bank.

The village of Trois-Palis is also situated 5 km southeast of Hiersac (the seat of its canton) and 10 km east of Châteauneuf-sur-Charente. It is part of the Grand Angoulême inter-municipal authority; to the east and south, the commune lies close to Nersac, La Couronne, Saint-Michel, Linars, and Fléac.

Although away from major highways, the commune is traversed by the D72 road, which runs along the right bank of the Charente towards Angoulême to the east, and the D41, which crosses the Charente at the *Pont de la Meure* bridge and connects the commune to Nersac. The D41 heads northwest towards Saint-Saturnin and Hiersac. The D84 and D53 roads also cross the western part of the commune. === Hamlets and localities === Settlement is quite dispersed, and the commune includes a few hamlets: Villars to the north, and Puybertier and l'Ageasson to the west, near Rochecorail. There are also a few housing developments, such as Pré Richard east of the village center, and La Plaine near Villars.

== History ==
In the Middle Ages, Trois-Palis lay on one of the pilgrimage routes to Santiago de Compostela in Charente. (Note: A cross-route coming from Limousin and Périgord, passing through Angoulême and following the Charente River to Saintes, where pilgrims went to venerate the relics of Saint Eutropius.) In 1538, a boat carrying pilgrims returning to Pomport in Périgord capsized on the Charente River, resulting in 39 fatalities.

In 1535, when a hunted John Calvin sought refuge in Angoulême under the alias "Charles d'Hespeville," he first found shelter with Louis du Tillet, the parish priest of Claix. Later, after his hiding place was discovered, he followed the advice of friends and took refuge in the Rochecorail caves to complete his work, *Institutes of the Christian Religion*.

These caves form several fairly large chambers—enlarged by human hands—that were connected to the dwelling by a drawbridge. They included an excavated, covered storage pit and had likely been inhabited since ancient times as a place of refuge. According to tradition, Calvin lived in the largest of these chambers.

At the end of the 17th century, following the Revocation of the Edict of Nantes, Protestants persecuted during the *dragonnades* also found refuge in these caves.

The commune's civil registration records date back to 1600, which is quite early for the department.

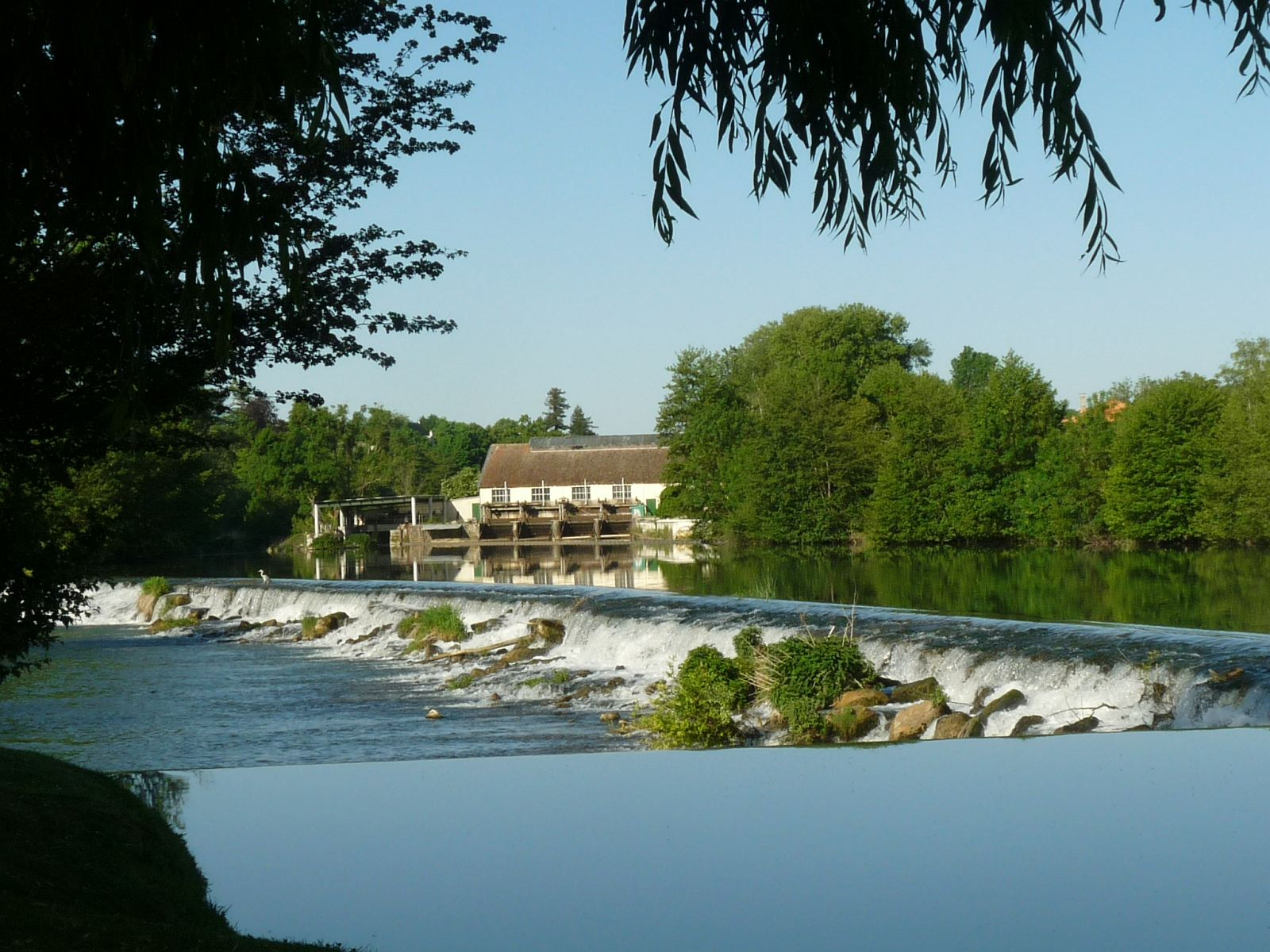
The La Mothe factory seen from the lock.

Trois-Palis had several mills, including a grain mill at the locality known as "La Mothe." In 1836, a metalworks was built on the site; it was converted into a paper mill in 1886 and later became an annex to the Sireuil tannery in the 1930s. It was converted into a hydroelectric power plant in 1963. In the mid-19th century, there were six waterwheels. By 1988, the facility housed two turbines from the Société Hydromécanique de Toulouse and a 300 kW CEM generator.

In the early 20th century, industry was also represented by the dimension stone quarries at Rochecorail.

== Population ==
Historical population

Year	Pop.	±% p.a.
1793	293	—
1821	271	−0.28%
1846	258	−0.20%
1872	321	+0.84%
1901	351	+0.31%
1926	313	−0.46%
1946	253	−1.06%
1962	318	+1.44%
1968	324	+0.31%

Year	Pop.	±% p.a.
1975	352	+1.19%
1982	504	+5.26%
1990	555	+1.21%
1999	673	+2.17%
2007	773	+1.75%
2012	880	+2.63%
2017	955	+1.65%
2023	944	−0.19%

Source: EHESS and INSEE (1968-2023)

== See also ==
- Communes of the Charente department
