= Marsac =

Marsac is the name or part of the name of several communes in France:

- Marsac, Charente
- Marsac, Creuse
- Marsac, Hautes-Pyrénées
- Marsac, Tarn-et-Garonne
- Marsac-en-Livradois
- Marsac-sur-Don
- Marsac-sur-l'Isle
