= Gilles de la Pommeraie =

La Pommeraie's coat of arms : de gueules à 3 grenades d'or

Gilles de la Pommeraie was a 16th-century French diplomat and Baron d'Entrammes.

== Biography ==
He was a member of the La Pommeraie family, from Brittany and serves Laval Family, and possessed land of Verger Castle of Montigné and d'Entrammes (Mayenne).

Son of François de la Pommeraie, Gilles was king's maître d', charged with important missions by Francis I, and was involved in arrangements for the "Field of Cloth of Gold", was ambassador in Venice, and was president of the "Dukes Chamber" in Brittany. He was briefly French ambassador to England, where he professed his great admiration for the French-educated queen, Anne Boleyn.

Husband to Jeanne Le Jeune, he obtained from Lord Jarzey the Castle of Entrammes (Mayenne) where he created two fairs and one market.

== Sources ==
« Gilles de la Pommeraie », dans Alphonse-Victor Angot et Ferdinand Gaugain, Dictionnaire historique, topographique et biographique de la Mayenne, Laval, Goupil, 1900-1910; t. III, p. 309-310.
