= Saint-Genis-d'Hiersac =

- Commune
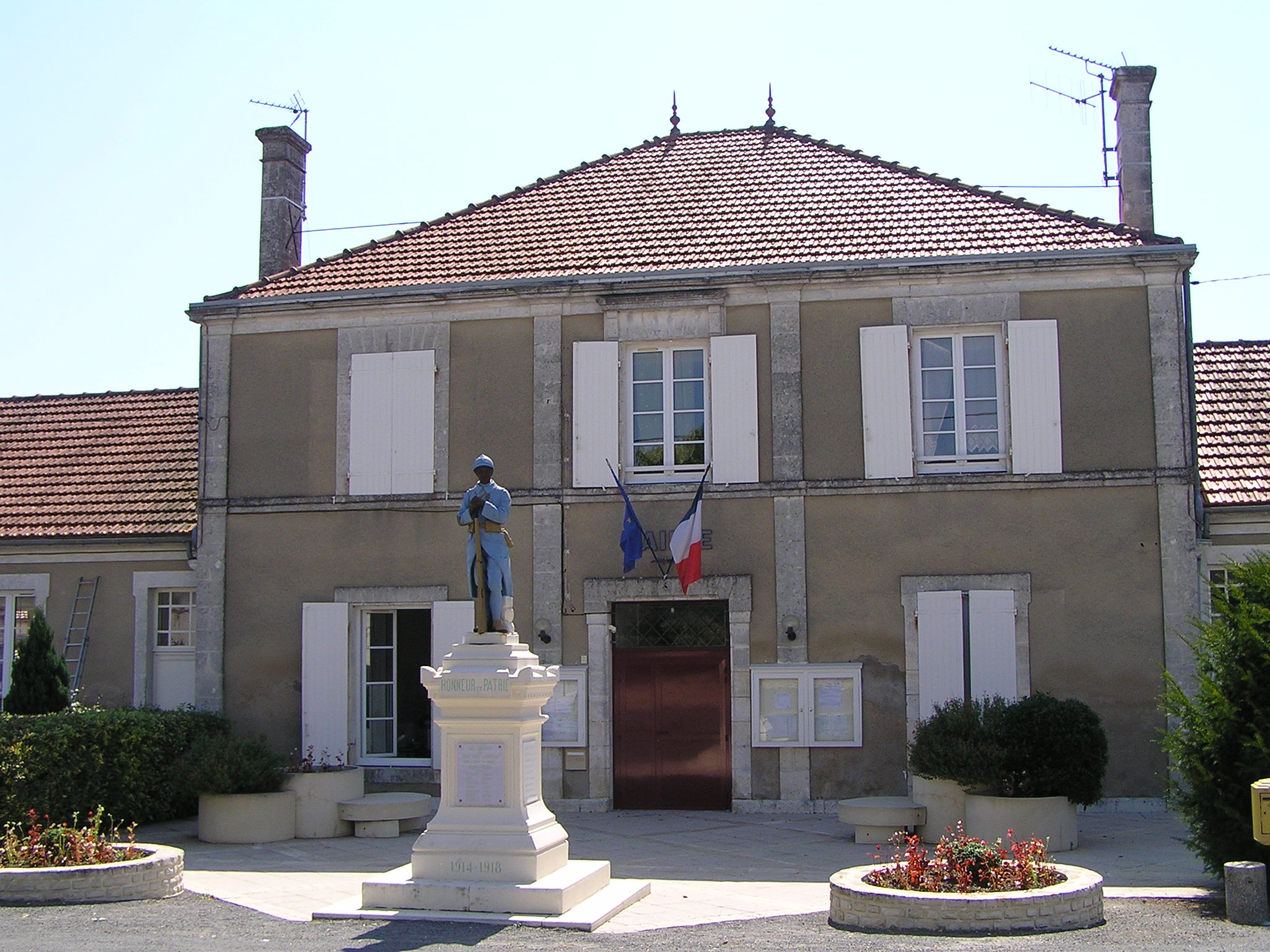
- Town hall
- Location of Saint-Genis-d'Hiersac
- Location within France Location within Nouvelle-Aquitaine
- Coordinates: 45°45′03″N 0°01′46″E
- Country: France
- Region: Nouvelle-Aquitaine
- Department: Charente
- Arrondissement: Cognac
- Canton: Val de Nouère
- Intercommunality: Rouillacais

Government
  - Mayor (2022–2026): Stéphanie Roturier
- Area^{1}: 19.08 km^{2} (7.37 sq mi)
- Elevation: 250 m (820 ft)
- Highest elevation: 147 m (482 ft)
- Lowest elevation: 41 m (135 ft)
- Population (2023): 942
  - Density: 49.4/km^{2} (128/sq mi)
- Time zone: UTC+01:00 (CET)
  - Summer (DST): UTC+02:00 (CEST)
- INSEE/Postal code: 16320 /16570
- ^{1} French Land Register data, which excludes lakes, ponds, glaciers > 1 km^{2} (0.386 sq mi or 247 acres) and river estuaries.

Saint-Genis-d'Hiersac (French pronunciation: [sɛ̃ ʒəni djɛʁsak], literally Saint-Genis of Hiersac) is a commune in the Charente department in southwestern France.

== Population ==
Historical population
Year	Pop.	±% p.a.
1968	706	—
1975	694	−0.24%
1982	724	+0.61%
1990	836	+1.81%
1999	806	−0.41%
2007	850	+0.67%
2012	893	+0.99%
2017	907	+0.31%
2023	942	+0.63%
Source: INSEE

== See also ==
- Communes of the Charente department
