= Auge-Saint-Médard =

- Part of Val-d'Auge
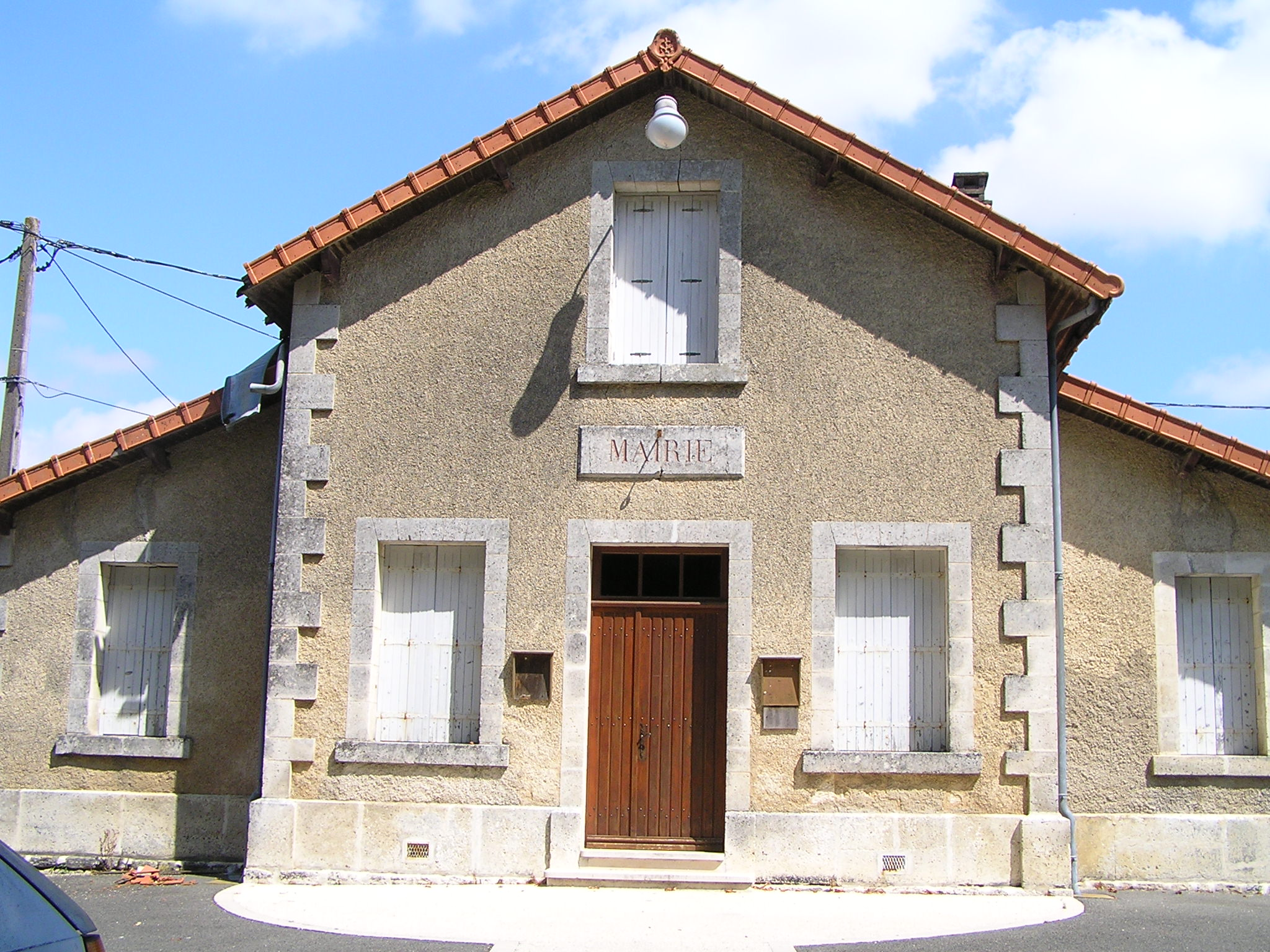
- Location of Auge-Saint-Médard
- Location within France Location within Nouvelle-Aquitaine
- Coordinates: 45°50′53″N 0°05′05″W
- Country: France
- Region: Nouvelle-Aquitaine
- Department: Charente
- Arrondissement: Cognac
- Canton: Val de Nouère
- Commune: Val-d'Auge
- Area^{1}: 17.37 km^{2} (6.71 sq mi)
- Elevation: 92 m (302 ft)
- Highest elevation: 131 m (430 ft)
- Lowest elevation: 69 m (226 ft)
- Population (2023): 304
  - Density: 17.5/km^{2} (45.3/sq mi)
- Time zone: UTC+01:00 (CET)
  - Summer (DST): UTC+02:00 (CEST)
- Postal code: 16170
- ^{1} French Land Register data, which excludes lakes, ponds, glaciers > 1 km^{2} (0.386 sq mi or 247 acres) and river estuaries.

Auge-Saint-Médard (French pronunciation: [oʒ sɛ̃ medaʁ]) is a former commune in the Charente department in southwestern France. Situated within it are small villages; Auge, Saint-Médard, and La Bréchoire. On 1 January 2019, it was merged into the new commune Val-d'Auge.

== See also ==
- Communes of the Charente department
