= Jean-Louis Bonnemain =

French plant physiologist

Jean-Louis Bonnemain, born on 7 May 1936 in Bignac (Charente), is a French plant physiologist specialising in the transport of photosynthesis products, phytohormones and plant protection products in plants. He is a member of the French Academy of sciences and Professor Emeritus at the University of Poitiers.

== Course ==
He began his career in secondary education at the Lycée Gay-Lussac in Limoges (1959–1964). While teaching natural sciences, he also conducted research on the Solanaceae conductive device at the university scientific college in Limoges. He developed a microautoradiography method to locate soluble radioactive molecules in plant tissues with unprecedented precision for the time, which led to his admission to the CNRS (attaché and then research fellow) from 1964 to 1970. He supported his doctorate at the University of Paris in 1968. He was appointed lecturer (2nd class professor) at the University of Lille 1 in 1970 and then 1st class professor at the University of Poitiers in 1975. He entered the exceptional class in 1987.

== Scientific work ==
It is well known that cambium produces wood on its inner side and secondary phloem on its outer side. However, various families of advanced plants are characterized by the presence of an internal phloem located on the periphery of the bone marrow and even, sometimes, by the presence of a phloem included in the wood, in fact supernumerary phloem whose functions were not well known. During his thesis, Jean-Louis Bonnemain showed that the external phloem and supernumerary phloem of Solanaceae form a complex network with junctions at precise levels and highlighted their specific function in supplying nutrients to precise plant organs. Then, with his students and some colleagues, he helped to highlight one of the two mechanisms allowing the export of photosynthesis products from the leaves (proton-saccharose symport, proton-amino acid symport), and demonstrated by an immunological approach that phloem companion cells ensure the energization of this export. This investigation has been extended to intergenerational nutrient exchanges, the functioning of sensory motor cells, the study of the impact of abiotic and biotic stress (aphids) on nutrient compartmentalization and cell growth, and the search for specific nutrient transporter inhibitors.

After showing for the first time in the past that the polarized circulation of auxin from the terminal bud took place in the cambial zone, he led work on the transport of several phytohormones, including stress hormones, with an emphasis on auxin because it is strategically positioned to regulate the production of conductive tissues and indirectly controls plant branching.

Finally, after studying pesticide systems in relation to industry, he programmed the synthesis of conjugates, which was carried out within a team of chemists. The current focus is on the vectorization of delayed conjugates combining defence molecules and an amino acid, as part of a reduction in pesticide use.

== Educational and supervisory responsibilities ==
- Creation and responsibility of the DEA "Plant biology and physiology" (Poitiers, 1980–1985).
- Co-responsible for the DEA "Sciences and technology of plant and food production" (Nantes, Poitiers, Rennes, Angers, 1985–1991).
- Direction or co-direction of 7 state theses, 17 postgraduate theses and 21 university theses.

== Other institutional responsibilities ==
- Creation and management of a CNRS team "Transport in plants" (ERA 701 then UA 574) (1977–1992)
- Head of the CNRS RCP "Transports et corrélations morphogénétiques" (Poitiers, Paris, Clermont-Ferrand, Brest) (1974–1980)
- Expert at the GET "Filière Bois", Ministry of Research and Technology (1981–1989)
- Expert at the University Advisory Committee, then at the Higher Committee on University Careers, then at the National Council of Universities (1973–1984, 1987–1991, 1994–1999)
- Project manager in the "Biology and Health" department at the MESR (1994)
- Distinctions
- CNRS Bronze medal (1968).
- Foulon de botanique prize, Academy of Sciences (1969).
- Correspondent of the French Academy of sciences (1978).
- Member of the French Academy of sciences (1992).
- Officier of the Palmes Académiques.

== Books and thematic issues of journals ==
- JL Bonnemain and C Dumas, La biologie végétale, PUF, Paris (1998).
- JL Bonnemain, S Delrot, W Lucas, J Dainty (eds), Recent advances in phloem transport and assimilate compatmentation, Presses académiques, Nantes (1991).
- JL Bonnemain (ed), Aphids as biological models and agricultural pests, CR Biologies (2010) 333: 461–573.
- JF Chollet, M Couderchet and JL Bonnemain (eds), Crop protections: new strategies for sustainable development, Environmental Science and Pollution Research (2014) 21: 4793–4976.
