= Mareuil, Charente =

Mareuil
- Commune
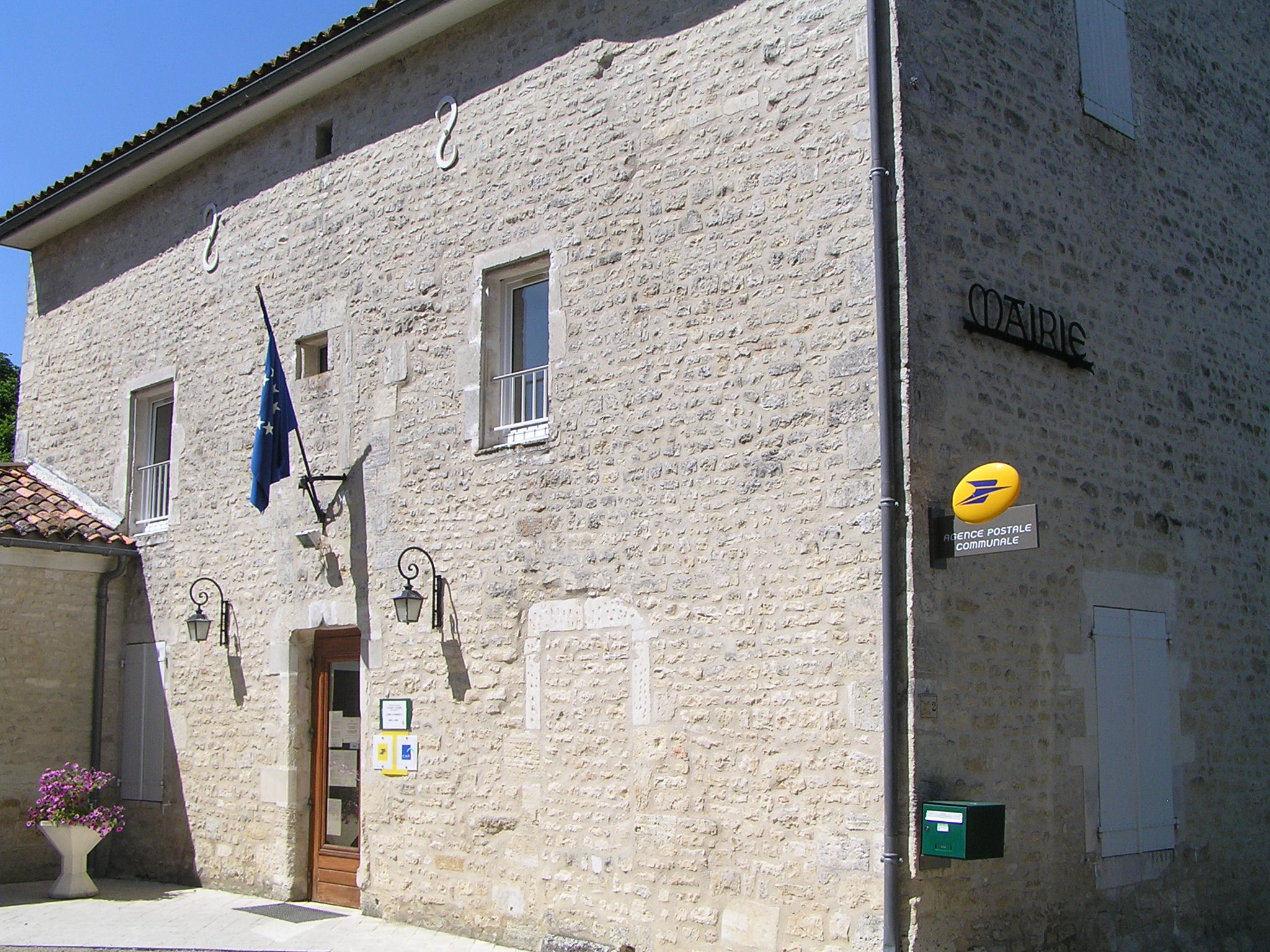
- Town hall
- Location of Mareuil
- Location within France Location within Nouvelle-Aquitaine
- Coordinates: 45°46′28″N 0°08′24″W
- Country: France
- Region: Nouvelle-Aquitaine
- Department: Charente
- Arrondissement: Cognac
- Canton: Val de Nouère
- Intercommunality: Rouillacais

Government
  - Mayor (2020–2026): Claudine Rodet
- Area^{1}: 11.51 km^{2} (4.44 sq mi)
- Elevation: 164 m (538 ft)
- Highest elevation: 125 m (410 ft)
- Lowest elevation: 53 m (174 ft)
- Population (2023): 398
  - Density: 34.6/km^{2} (89.6/sq mi)
- Time zone: UTC+01:00 (CET)
  - Summer (DST): UTC+02:00 (CEST)
- INSEE/Postal code: 16208 /16170
- ^{1} French Land Register data, which excludes lakes, ponds, glaciers > 1 km^{2} (0.386 sq mi or 247 acres) and river estuaries.

Mareuil (French pronunciation: [maʁœj]) is a commune in the Charente department in southwestern France.

== Population ==
Historical population
| Year | Pop. | ±% p.a. |
|---|---|---|
| 1968 | 319 | — |
| 1975 | 333 | +0.62% |
| 1982 | 298 | −1.57% |
| 1990 | 360 | +2.39% |
| 1999 | 351 | −0.28% |
| 2007 | 381 | +1.03% |
| 2012 | 409 | +1.43% |
| 2017 | 405 | −0.20% |
| 2023 | 398 | −0.29% |
Source: INSEE

== See also ==
- Communes of the Charente department
