= Jules Trousset =

French encyclopedist, historian and geographer

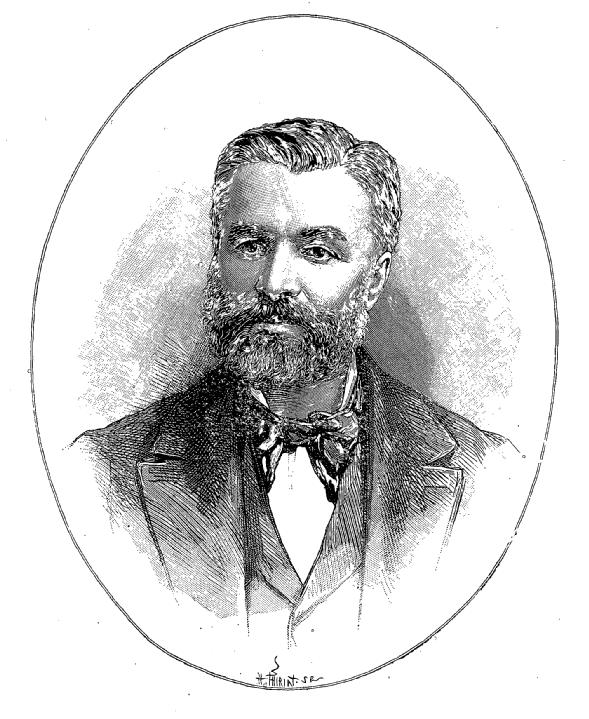
Portrait engraved by Henri Thiriat (1885).

Jules Trousset (28 August 1842 in Moulidars (Charente) – 1905, Paris) was a 19th-century French encyclopedist, historian and geographer.

== Biography ==
Although he was a well known man in his time, very few things have survived on the life of Jules Trousset. A former teacher and director of publication, he was the author of popular books. He notably wrote the Atlas national and the Encyclopédie d’économie domestique, both rewarded by learned societies. A committed man, he founded Le Réveil républicain. Organe des Comités républicains du canton de Sceaux et de Villejuif and was mayor of Malakoff from 1893 to 1896.

== « Le Trousset » ==
His most famous work is the Nouveau dictionnaire encyclopédique universel illustré, or Répertoire des connaissances humaines, nicknamed "le Trousset", published in Paris between 1885 and 1891, adorned with more than 3,000 engravings.

This work, which paid tribute to Pierre Larousse with whom he worked, tried to complete all knowledge. Trousset joined hundreds of foreign correspondents to his company. He sold the book by subscription, the buyers paying when all volumes had been received. Success was at the rendezvous.

== Works ==
- Le livre universel : répertoire des connaissances utiles. Tome 1, Librairie scientifique et historique (Paris) Text online
- Le livre universel : répertoire des connaissances utiles. Tome 2, Librairie scientifique et historique (Paris) Text online
- Le livre universel : répertoire des connaissances utiles. Tome 3, Librairie scientifique et historique (Paris) Text online
- 1875: Guide illustré du faisandier, notice sur l'acclimatation et l'éducation des oiseaux de chasse et de luxe... Édition revue... comprenant l'agencement de la faisandrie... le traitement des maladies et 18 recettes culinaires.
- 1880: Histoire nationale de la marine et des marins français depuis Jean-Bart jusqu'à nos jours
- 1881: Histoire illustrée des pirates, corsaires, flibustiers, boucaniers, forbans, négriers et écumeurs de mer dans tous les temps et dans tous les pays
- 1895: Voyage en Dauphiné, Savoie et Suisse
