= Genac =

Commune in Charente, France

- Part of Genac-Bignac
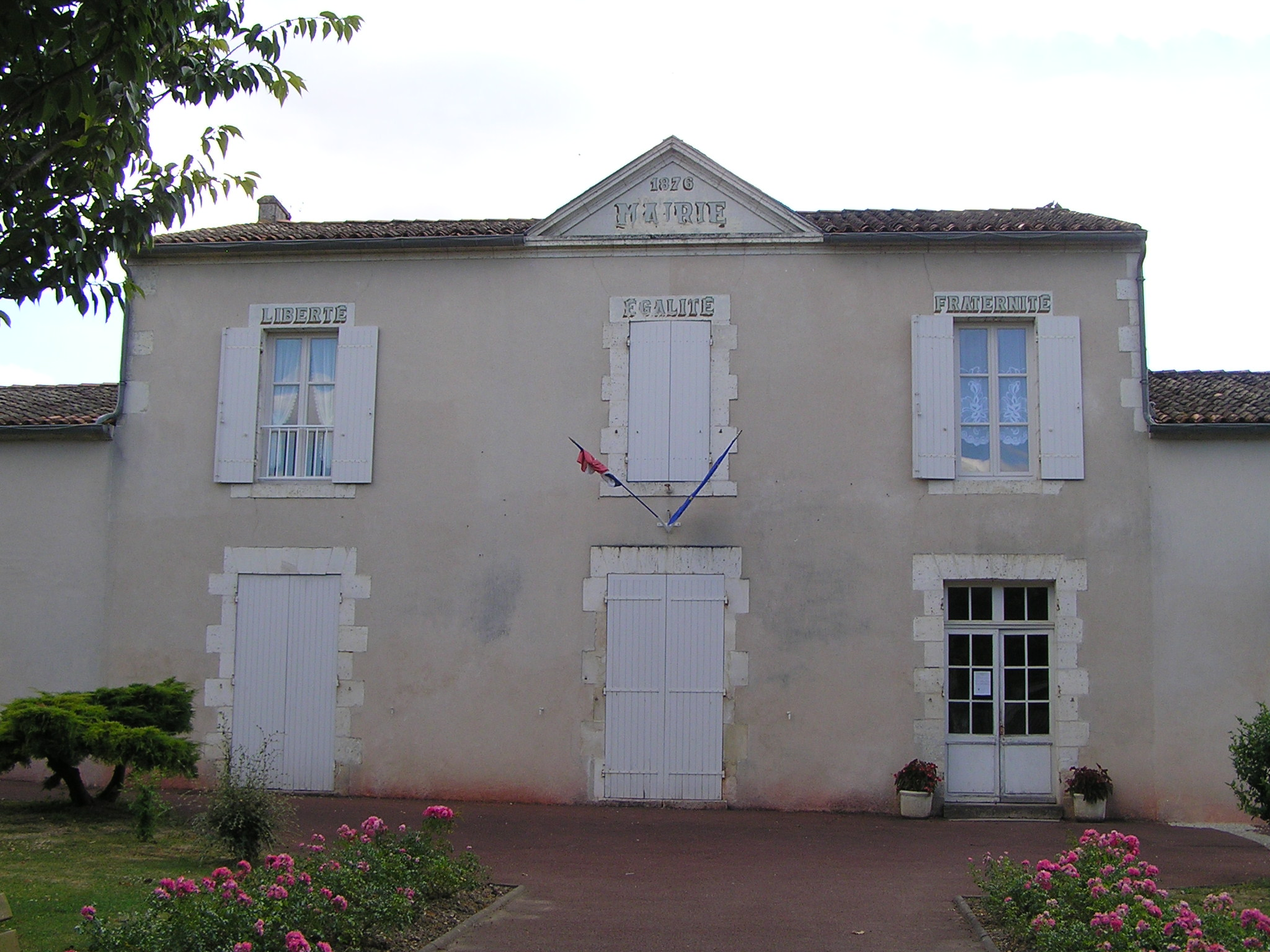
- Town hall
- Location of Genac
- Location within France Location within Nouvelle-Aquitaine
- Coordinates: 45°47′59″N 0°01′35″E
- Country: France
- Region: Nouvelle-Aquitaine
- Department: Charente
- Arrondissement: Cognac
- Canton: Rouillac
- Commune: Genac-Bignac
- Area^{1}: 25.84 km^{2} (9.98 sq mi)
- Elevation: 70 m (230 ft)
- Highest elevation: 157 m (515 ft)
- Lowest elevation: 44 m (144 ft)
- Population (2019): 773
  - Density: 29.9/km^{2} (77.5/sq mi)
- Time zone: UTC+01:00 (CET)
  - Summer (DST): UTC+02:00 (CEST)
- Postal code: 16170
- ^{1} French Land Register data, which excludes lakes, ponds, glaciers > 1 km^{2} (0.386 sq mi or 247 acres) and river estuaries.

Genac (French pronunciation: [ʒənak]) is a former commune in the Charente department in southwestern France. On 1 January 2016, it was merged into the new commune Genac-Bignac.

== Population ==
Historical population

Year	Pop.	±% p.a.
1793	1,538	—
1800	1,704	+1.47%
1806	1,291	−4.52%
1821	1,432	+0.69%
1831	1,503	+0.49%
1841	1,564	+0.40%
1846	1,612	+0.61%
1851	1,623	+0.14%
1856	1,568	−0.69%
1861	1,577	+0.11%
1866	1,511	−0.85%
1872	1,523	+0.13%
1876	1,508	−0.25%
1881	1,281	−3.21%
1886	1,208	−1.17%
1891	1,090	−2.03%
1896	1,056	−0.63%

Year	Pop.	±% p.a.
1901	1,037	−0.36%
1906	971	−1.31%
1911	922	−1.03%
1921	823	−1.13%
1926	805	−0.44%
1931	767	−0.96%
1936	765	−0.05%
1946	774	+0.12%
1954	765	−0.15%
1962	708	−0.96%
1968	685	−0.55%
1975	686	+0.02%
1982	678	−0.17%
1990	761	+1.45%
1999	687	−1.13%
2006	672	−0.31%
2019	773	+1.08%

Source: EHESS and INSEE (2019)

== See also ==
- Communes of the Charente department
