= Mons, Charente =

Mons
- Commune
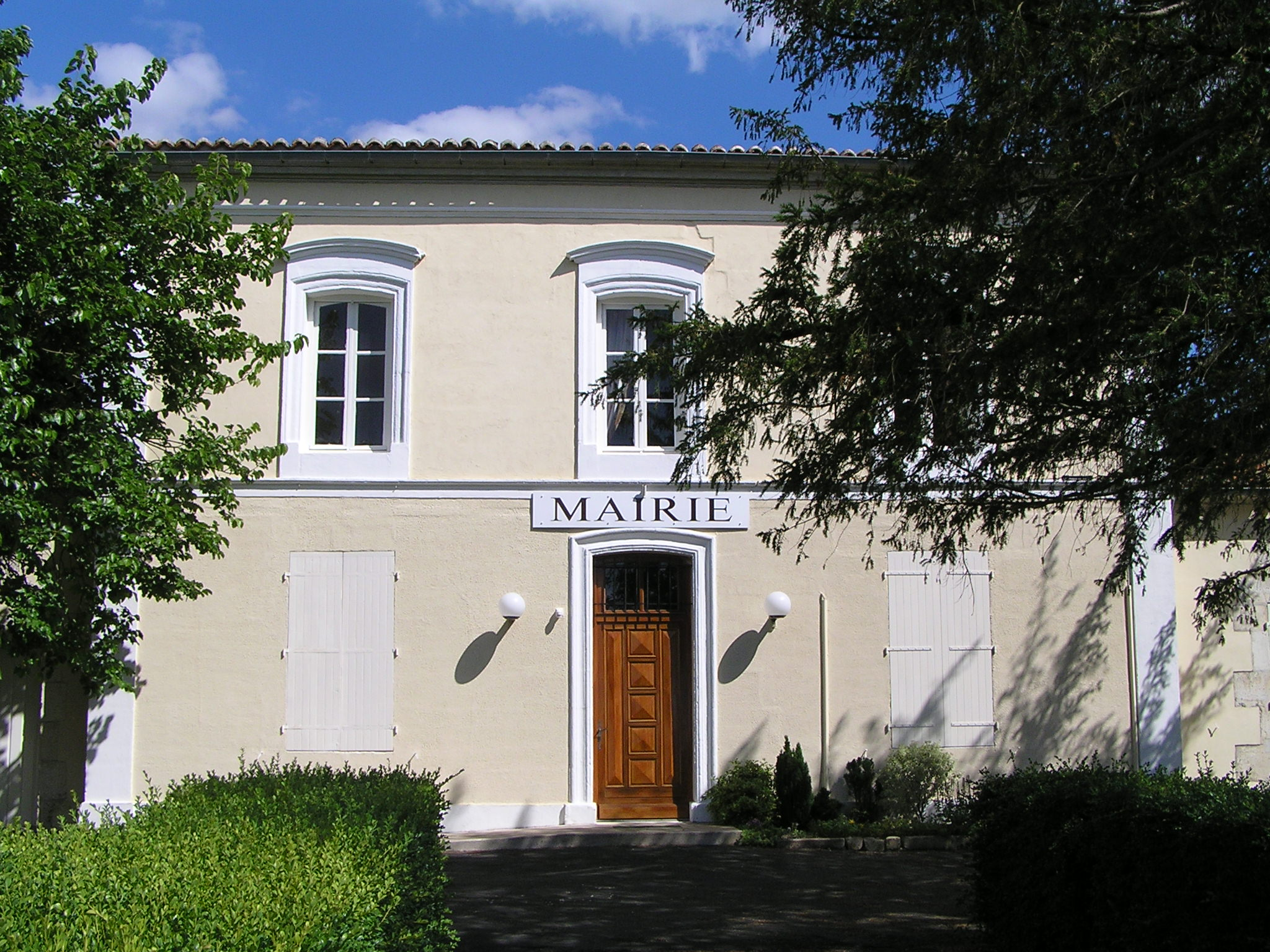
- Town Hall
- Location of Mons
- Location within France Location within Nouvelle-Aquitaine
- Coordinates: 45°52′10″N 0°00′49″W
- Country: France
- Region: Nouvelle-Aquitaine
- Department: Charente
- Arrondissement: Cognac
- Canton: Val de Nouère
- Intercommunality: Rouillacais

Government
  - Mayor (2020–2026): Patrick Mesnard
- Area^{1}: 20.11 km^{2} (7.76 sq mi)
- Elevation: 85 m (279 ft)
- Highest elevation: 141 m (463 ft)
- Lowest elevation: 54 m (177 ft)
- Population (2023): 240
  - Density: 12/km^{2} (31/sq mi)
- Time zone: UTC+01:00 (CET)
  - Summer (DST): UTC+02:00 (CEST)
- INSEE/Postal code: 16221 /16140
- ^{1} French Land Register data, which excludes lakes, ponds, glaciers > 1 km^{2} (0.386 sq mi or 247 acres) and river estuaries.

Mons is a commune in the Charente département in southwestern France.

== Population ==
Historical population
Year	Pop.	±% p.a.
1968	278	—
1975	257	−1.12%
1982	228	−1.70%
1990	225	−0.17%
1999	232	+0.34%
2007	259	+1.39%
2012	255	−0.31%
2017	247	−0.64%
2023	240	−0.48%
Source: INSEE

== See also ==
- Communes of the Charente department
