= Échallat =

- Commune
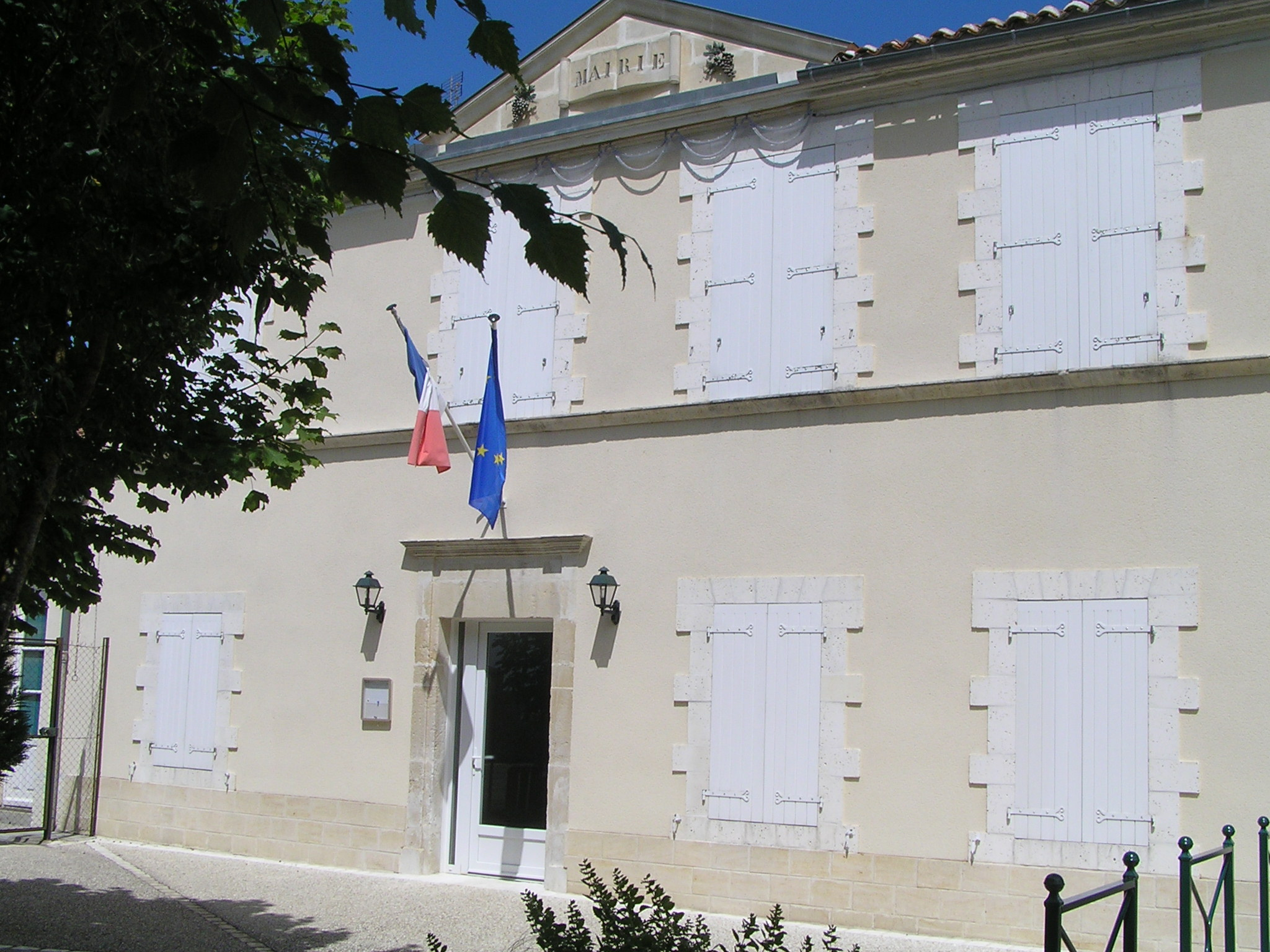
- Town hall
- Location of Échallat
- Location within France Location within Nouvelle-Aquitaine
- Coordinates: 45°43′26″N 0°02′21″W
- Country: France
- Region: Nouvelle-Aquitaine
- Department: Charente
- Arrondissement: Cognac
- Canton: Val de Nouère
- Intercommunality: Rouillacais

Government
  - Mayor (2020–2026): Alain Briand
- Area^{1}: 15.14 km^{2} (5.85 sq mi)
- Elevation: 89 m (292 ft)
- Highest elevation: 149 m (489 ft)
- Lowest elevation: 50 m (160 ft)
- Population (2023): 480
  - Density: 32/km^{2} (82/sq mi)
- Time zone: UTC+01:00 (CET)
  - Summer (DST): UTC+02:00 (CEST)
- INSEE/Postal code: 16123 /16170
- ^{1} French Land Register data, which excludes lakes, ponds, glaciers > 1 km^{2} (0.386 sq mi or 247 acres) and river estuaries.

Échallat (French pronunciation: [eʃala]) is a commune in the Charente department in southwestern France.

== Population ==
Historical population
| Year | Pop. | ±% p.a. |
|---|---|---|
| 1968 | 402 | — |
| 1975 | 400 | −0.07% |
| 1982 | 407 | +0.25% |
| 1990 | 426 | +0.57% |
| 1999 | 423 | −0.08% |
| 2007 | 445 | +0.64% |
| 2012 | 497 | +2.23% |
| 2017 | 497 | +0.00% |
| 2023 | 480 | −0.58% |
Source: INSEE

== See also ==
- Communes of the Charente department
