= Vaux-Rouillac =

- Commune
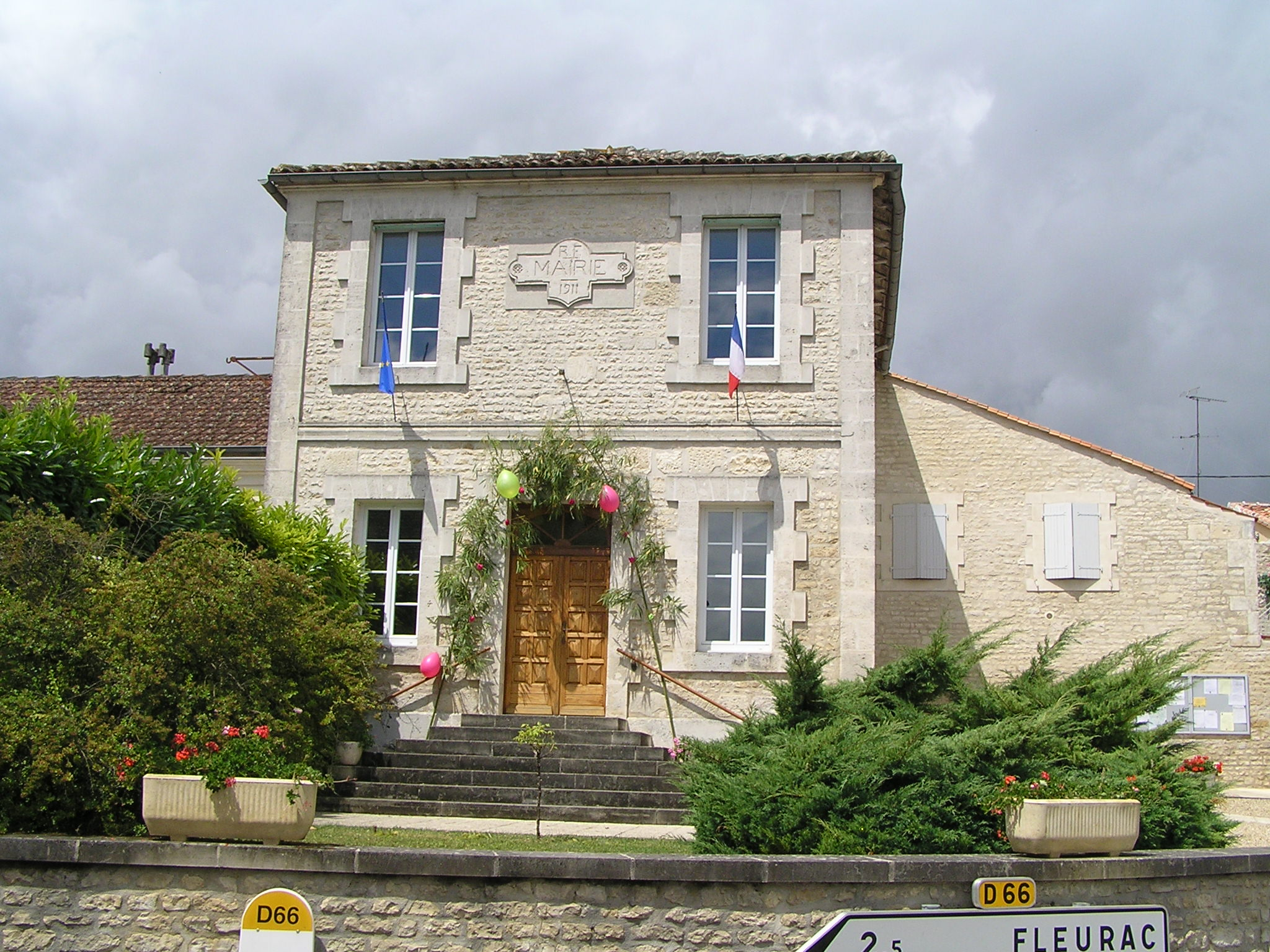
- Town hall
- Location of Vaux-Rouillac
- Location within France Location within Nouvelle-Aquitaine
- Coordinates: 45°44′38″N 0°05′25″W
- Country: France
- Region: Nouvelle-Aquitaine
- Department: Charente
- Arrondissement: Cognac
- Canton: Val de Nouère
- Intercommunality: Rouillacais

Government
  - Mayor (2020–2026): Jean-Guy Chauvet
- Area^{1}: 13.37 km^{2} (5.16 sq mi)
- Elevation: 169 m (554 ft)
- Highest elevation: 169 m (554 ft)
- Lowest elevation: 58 m (190 ft)
- Population (2023): 294
  - Density: 22.0/km^{2} (57.0/sq mi)
- Time zone: UTC+01:00 (CET)
  - Summer (DST): UTC+02:00 (CEST)
- INSEE/Postal code: 16395 /16170
- ^{1} French Land Register data, which excludes lakes, ponds, glaciers > 1 km^{2} (0.386 sq mi or 247 acres) and river estuaries.

Vaux-Rouillac (French pronunciation: [vo ʁujak]) is a commune in the Charente department in southwestern France.

== Population ==
Historical population
Year	Pop.	±% p.a.
1968	342	—
1975	343	+0.04%
1982	330	−0.55%
1990	321	−0.35%
1999	294	−0.97%
2007	299	+0.21%
2012	299	+0.00%
2017	297	−0.13%
2023	294	−0.17%
Source: INSEE

== See also ==
- Communes of the Charente department
