= Jacques Friteyre-Durvé =

French Jesuit

Jakub Friteyre-Durvé (1725–1792) was a French Jesuit. He was born in Marsac-en-Livradois, a town in Puy-de-Dôme.
