= Sireuil =

- Commune
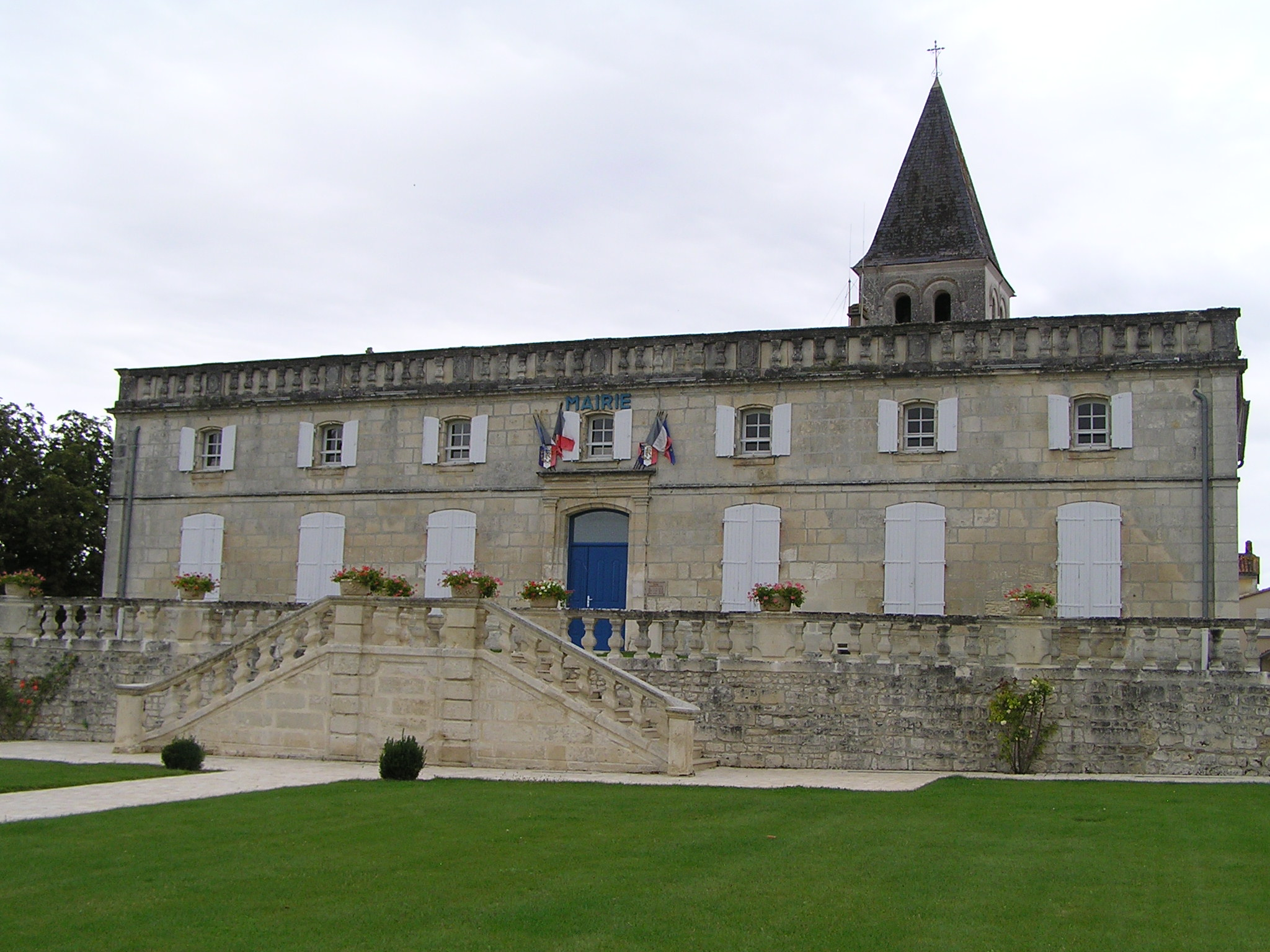
- Town hall
- Location of Sireuil
- Location within France Location within Nouvelle-Aquitaine
- Coordinates: 45°36′59″N 0°00′38″E
- Country: France
- Region: Nouvelle-Aquitaine
- Department: Charente
- Arrondissement: Angoulême
- Canton: Val de Nouère
- Intercommunality: CA Grand Angoulême

Government
  - Mayor (2020–2026): Jean-Luc Martial
- Area^{1}: 10.01 km^{2} (3.86 sq mi)
- Elevation: 27 m (89 ft)
- Highest elevation: 87 m (285 ft)
- Lowest elevation: 20 m (66 ft)
- Population (2023): 1,166
  - Density: 116.5/km^{2} (301.7/sq mi)
- Time zone: UTC+01:00 (CET)
  - Summer (DST): UTC+02:00 (CEST)
- INSEE/Postal code: 16370 /16440
- ^{1} French Land Register data, which excludes lakes, ponds, glaciers > 1 km^{2} (0.386 sq mi or 247 acres) and river estuaries.

Sireuil (French pronunciation: [siʁœj]) is a commune in the Charente department in southwestern France.

== Population ==
Historical population
Year	Pop.	±% p.a.
1968	1,023	—
1975	989	−0.48%
1982	899	−1.35%
1990	1,121	+2.80%
1999	1,127	+0.06%
2007	1,178	+0.55%
2012	1,169	−0.15%
2017	1,158	−0.19%
2023	1,166	+0.11%
Source: INSEE

== See also ==
- Communes of the Charente department
