= Val-d'Auge =

- Commune
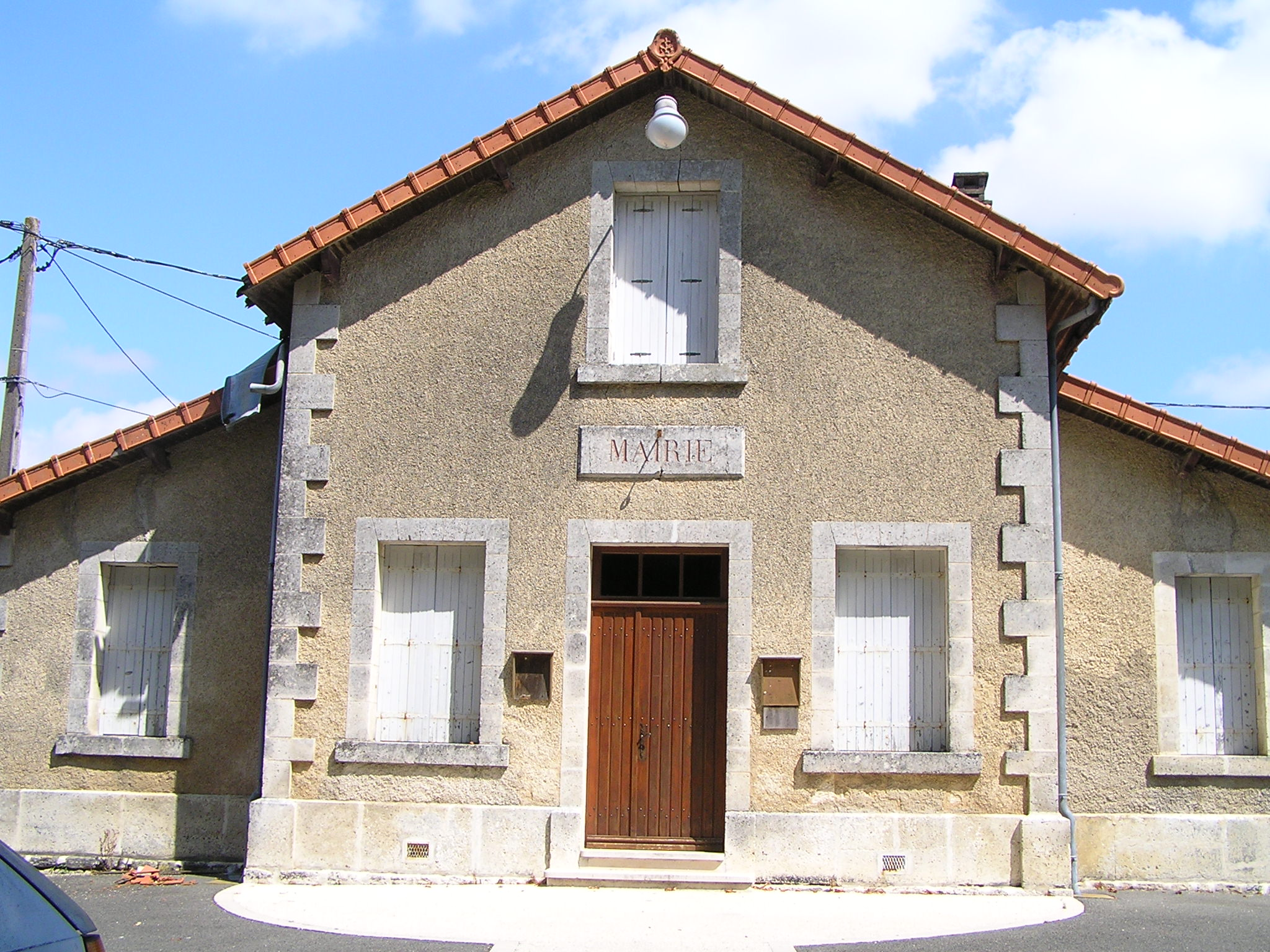
- The town hall in Val-d'Auge
- Location of Val-d'Auge
- Location within France Location within Nouvelle-Aquitaine
- Coordinates: 45°50′53″N 0°05′05″W
- Country: France
- Region: Nouvelle-Aquitaine
- Department: Charente
- Arrondissement: Cognac
- Canton: Val de Nouère
- Intercommunality: Rouillacais

Government
  - Mayor (2020–2026): Bernard Salamand
- Area^{1}: 44.52 km^{2} (17.19 sq mi)
- Highest elevation: 130 m (430 ft)
- Lowest elevation: 69 m (226 ft)
- Population (2023): 792
  - Density: 17.8/km^{2} (46.1/sq mi)
- Time zone: UTC+01:00 (CET)
  - Summer (DST): UTC+02:00 (CEST)
- INSEE/Postal code: 16339 /16170
- ^{1} French Land Register data, which excludes lakes, ponds, glaciers > 1 km^{2} (0.386 sq mi or 247 acres) and river estuaries.

Val-d'Auge (French pronunciation: [val doʒ]; lit. 'Vale of Auge') is a commune in the department of Charente, southwestern France. It was established on 1 January 2019 by merger of the former communes of Auge-Saint-Médard (the seat), Anville, Bonneville and Montigné.

== See also ==
- Communes of the Charente department
