= Saint-Amant-de-Nouère =

- Commune
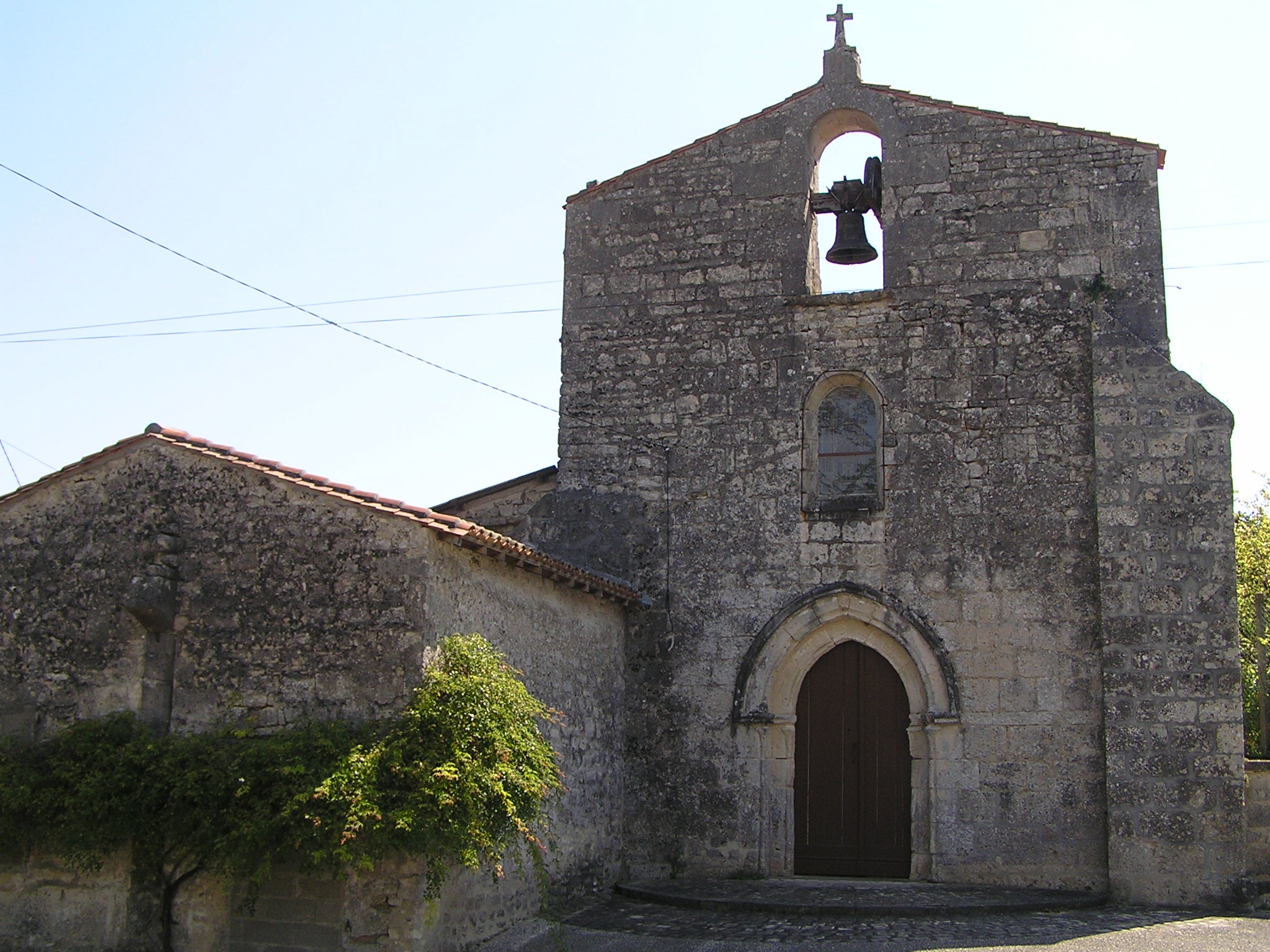
- The church in Saint-Amant
- Location of Saint-Amant-de-Nouère
- Location within France Location within Nouvelle-Aquitaine
- Coordinates: 45°44′48″N 0°00′09″E
- Country: France
- Region: Nouvelle-Aquitaine
- Department: Charente
- Arrondissement: Cognac
- Canton: Val de Nouère
- Intercommunality: Rouillacais

Government
  - Mayor (2024–2026): Laurent Baty
- Area^{1}: 11.15 km^{2} (4.31 sq mi)
- Elevation: 100 m (330 ft)
- Highest elevation: 130 m (430 ft)
- Lowest elevation: 62 m (203 ft)
- Population (2023): 345
  - Density: 30.9/km^{2} (80.1/sq mi)
- Time zone: UTC+01:00 (CET)
  - Summer (DST): UTC+02:00 (CEST)
- INSEE/Postal code: 16298 /16170
- ^{1} French Land Register data, which excludes lakes, ponds, glaciers > 1 km^{2} (0.386 sq mi or 247 acres) and river estuaries.

Saint-Amant-de-Nouère (French pronunciation: [sɛ̃.t‿amɑ̃ də nwɛʁ]) is a commune in the Charente department in southwestern France.

== Population ==
Historical population
Year	Pop.	±% p.a.
1968	352	—
1975	331	−0.87%
1982	350	+0.80%
1990	372	+0.76%
1999	382	+0.30%
2007	383	+0.03%
2012	430	+2.34%
2017	404	−1.24%
2023	345	−2.60%
Source: INSEE

== See also ==
- Communes of the Charente department
