= Bignac =

Commune in Charente, France

- Part of Genac-Bignac
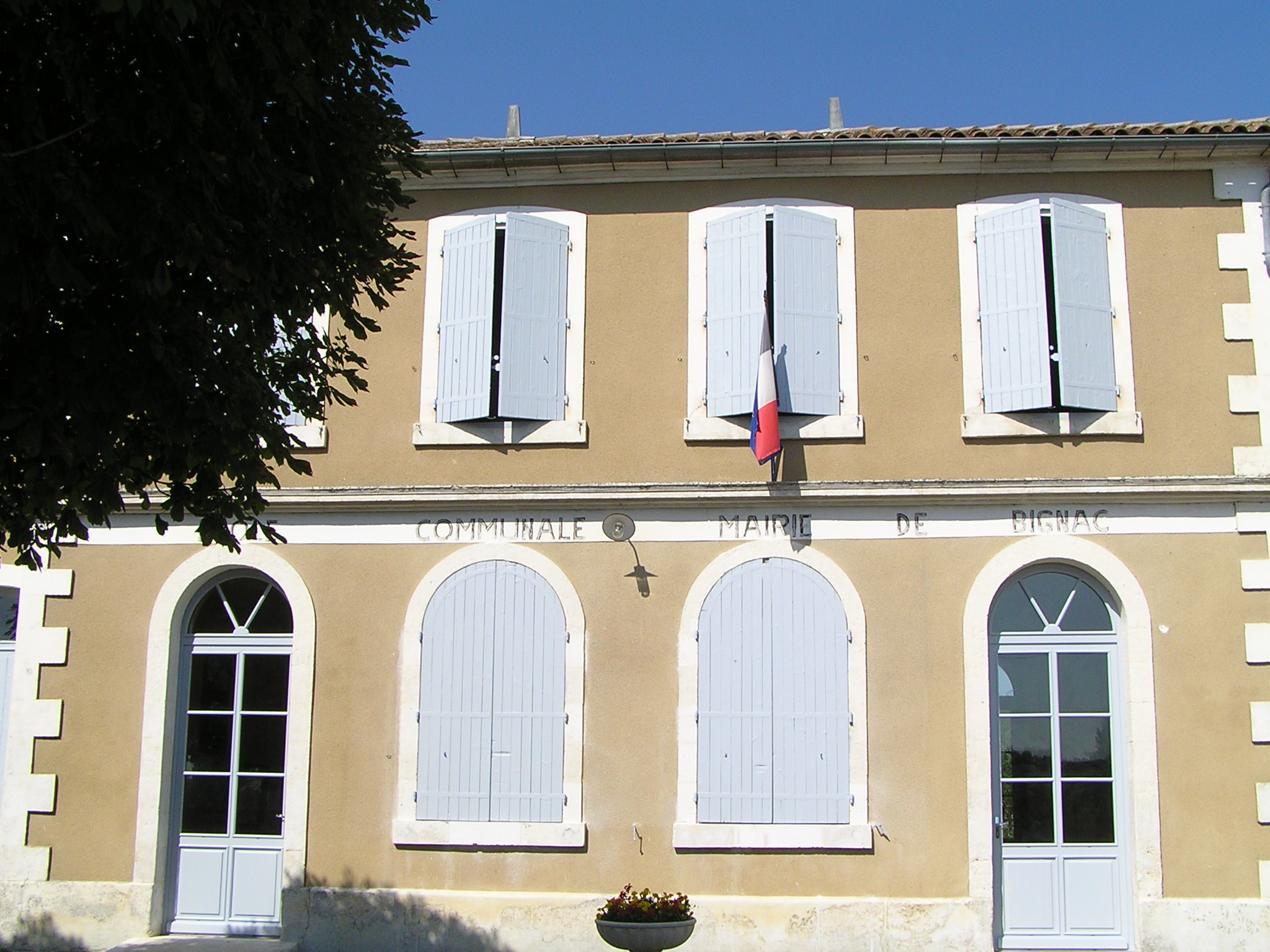
- Town hall
- Location of Bignac
- Location within France Location within Nouvelle-Aquitaine
- Coordinates: 45°47′07″N 0°03′34″E
- Country: France
- Region: Nouvelle-Aquitaine
- Department: Charente
- Arrondissement: Cognac
- Canton: Val de Nouère
- Commune: Genac-Bignac
- Area^{1}: 7.77 km^{2} (3.00 sq mi)
- Elevation: 78 m (256 ft)
- Highest elevation: 143 m (469 ft)
- Lowest elevation: 42 m (138 ft)
- Population (2019): 238
  - Density: 30.6/km^{2} (79.3/sq mi)
- Time zone: UTC+01:00 (CET)
  - Summer (DST): UTC+02:00 (CEST)
- Postal code: 16170
- ^{1} French Land Register data, which excludes lakes, ponds, glaciers > 1 km^{2} (0.386 sq mi or 247 acres) and river estuaries.

Bignac (French pronunciation: [biɲak]) is a former commune in the Charente department in southwestern France. On 1 January 2016, it was merged into the new commune Genac-Bignac.

== Population ==
Historical population

Year	Pop.	±% p.a.
1793	422	—
1821	467	+0.36%
1846	540	+0.58%
1872	442	−0.77%
1901	315	−1.16%
1926	252	−0.89%
1946	180	−1.67%

Year	Pop.	±% p.a.
1962	153	−1.01%
1968	155	+0.22%
1975	160	+0.45%
1982	178	+1.53%
1990	168	−0.72%
1999	198	+1.84%
2019	238	+0.92%

Source: EHESS and INSEE (2019)

== See also ==
- Communes of the Charente department
