= Moulidars =

- Commune
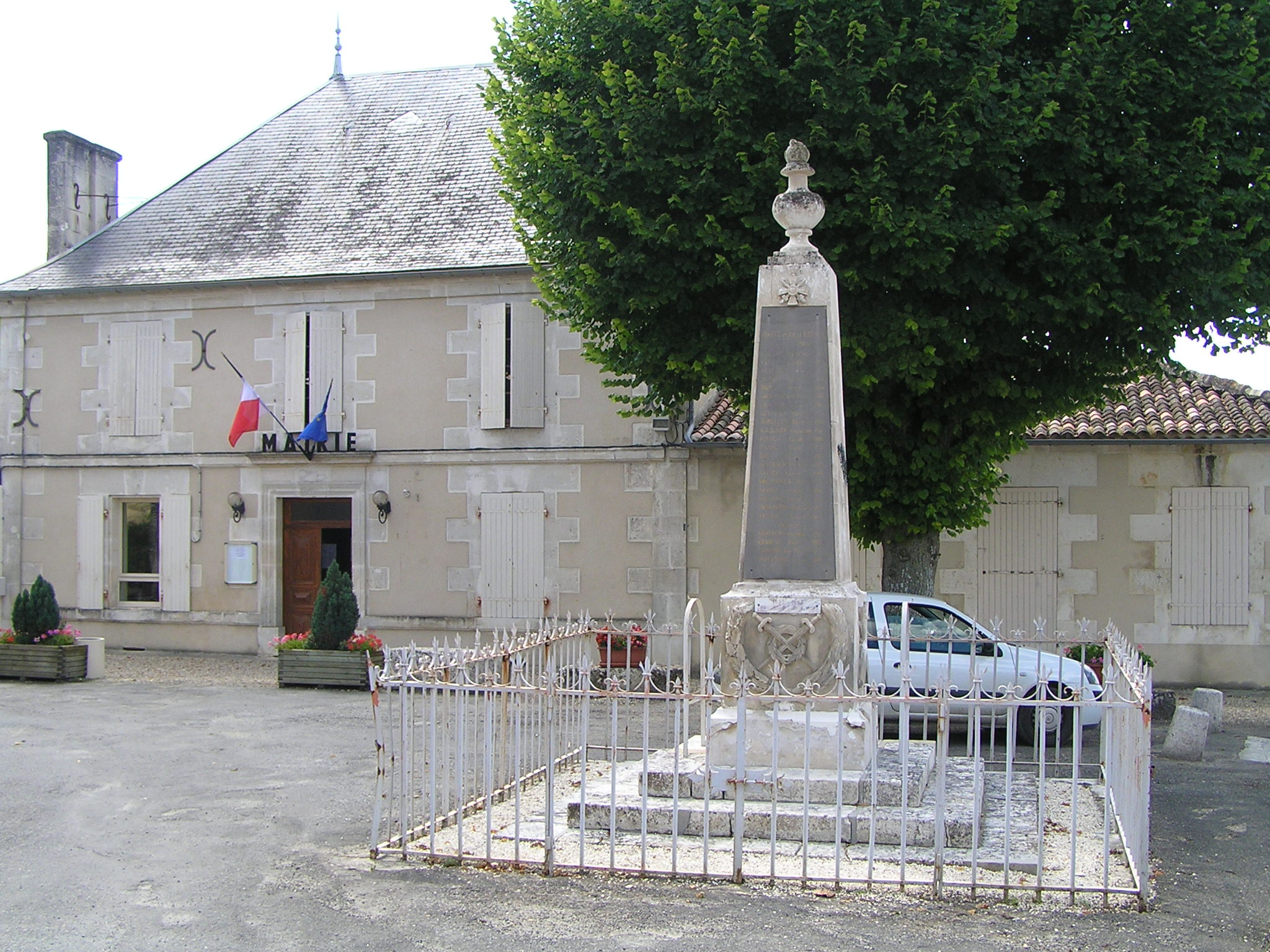
- Town hall
- Location of Moulidars
- Location within France Location within Nouvelle-Aquitaine
- Coordinates: 45°39′44″N 0°02′12″W
- Country: France
- Region: Nouvelle-Aquitaine
- Department: Charente
- Arrondissement: Cognac
- Canton: Val de Nouère
- Intercommunality: CA Grand Cognac

Government
  - Mayor (2020–2026): Sylvie Mocœur
- Area^{1}: 17.17 km^{2} (6.63 sq mi)
- Elevation: 90 m (300 ft)
- Highest elevation: 103 m (338 ft)
- Lowest elevation: 22 m (72 ft)
- Population (2023): 662
  - Density: 38.6/km^{2} (99.9/sq mi)
- Time zone: UTC+01:00 (CET)
  - Summer (DST): UTC+02:00 (CEST)
- INSEE/Postal code: 16234 /16290
- ^{1} French Land Register data, which excludes lakes, ponds, glaciers > 1 km^{2} (0.386 sq mi or 247 acres) and river estuaries.

Moulidars (French pronunciation: [mulidaʁ]) is a commune in the department of Charente in the southwestern region of France. The encyclopedist Jules Trousset (1842–1905) was born in Médars.

== Population ==
Historical population
Year	Pop.	±% p.a.
1968	569	—
1975	521	−1.25%
1982	504	−0.47%
1990	543	+0.94%
1999	558	+0.30%
2007	717	+3.18%
2012	745	+0.77%
2017	725	−0.54%
2023	662	−1.50%
Source: INSEE

== See also ==
- Communes of the Charente department
