= Asnières-sur-Nouère =

- Commune
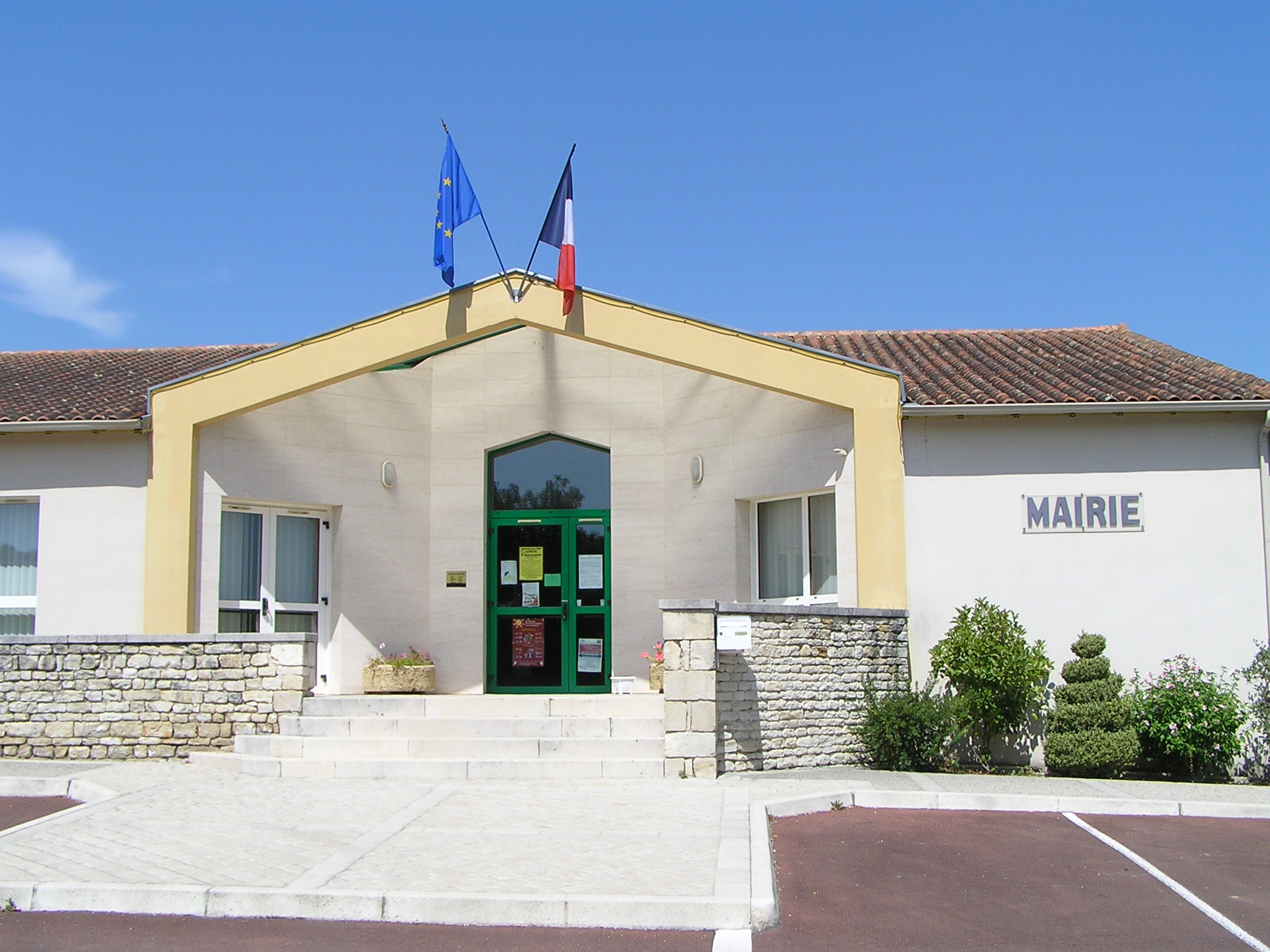
- Town hall

- Coat of arms
- Location of Asnières-sur-Nouère
- Location within France Location within Nouvelle-Aquitaine
- Coordinates: 45°42′42″N 0°02′54″E
- Country: France
- Region: Nouvelle-Aquitaine
- Department: Charente
- Arrondissement: Angoulême
- Canton: Val de Nouère
- Intercommunality: Grand Angoulême

Government
  - Mayor (2020–2026): Chantal Doyen-Morange
- Area^{1}: 21.17 km^{2} (8.17 sq mi)
- Elevation: 109 m (358 ft)
- Highest elevation: 135 m (443 ft)
- Lowest elevation: 36 m (118 ft)
- Population (2023): 1,272
  - Density: 60.09/km^{2} (155.6/sq mi)
- Time zone: UTC+01:00 (CET)
  - Summer (DST): UTC+02:00 (CEST)
- INSEE/Postal code: 16019 /16290
- ^{1} French Land Register data, which excludes lakes, ponds, glaciers > 1 km^{2} (0.386 sq mi or 247 acres) and river estuaries.

Asnières-sur-Nouère (French pronunciation: [ɑnjɛʁ syʁ nwɛʁ]) is a commune in the Charente department in southwestern France.

== Population ==
Historical population
Year	Pop.	±% p.a.
1968	639	—
1975	666	+0.59%
1982	820	+3.02%
1990	1,015	+2.70%
1999	1,013	−0.02%
2007	1,093	+0.95%
2012	1,192	+1.75%
2017	1,224	+0.53%
2023	1,272	+0.64%
Source: INSEE

== See also ==
- Communes of the Charente department
