= Champmillon =

- Commune
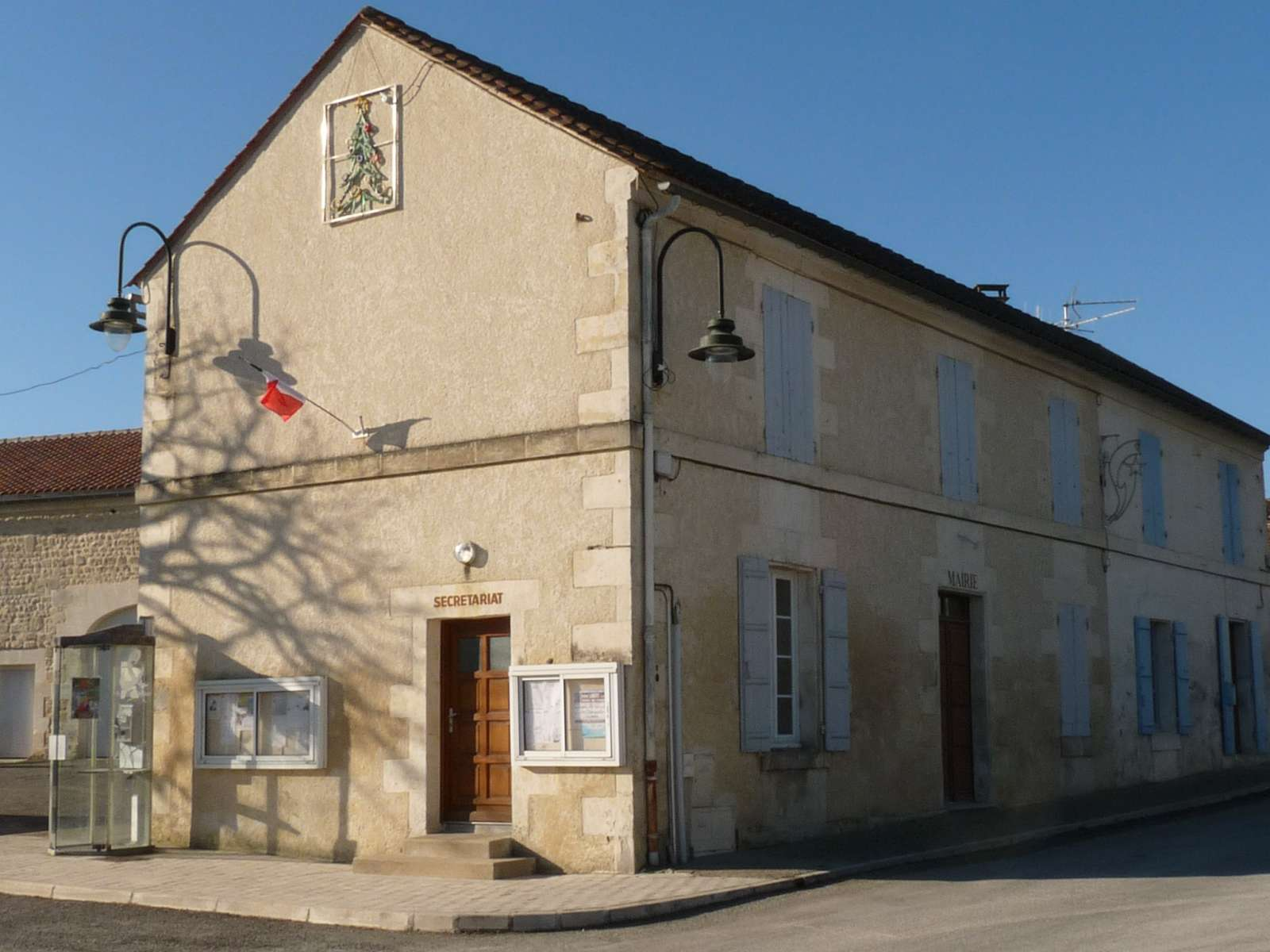
- The town hall in Champmillon
- Location of Champmillon
- Location within France Location within Nouvelle-Aquitaine
- Coordinates: 45°38′23″N 0°00′02″E
- Country: France
- Region: Nouvelle-Aquitaine
- Department: Charente
- Arrondissement: Cognac
- Canton: Val de Nouère
- Intercommunality: CA Grand Cognac

Government
  - Mayor (2020–2026): Jean-Claude Annonier
- Area^{1}: 9.51 km^{2} (3.67 sq mi)
- Elevation: 96 m (315 ft)
- Highest elevation: 97 m (318 ft)
- Lowest elevation: 21 m (69 ft)
- Population (2023): 534
  - Density: 56.2/km^{2} (145/sq mi)
- Time zone: UTC+01:00 (CET)
  - Summer (DST): UTC+02:00 (CEST)
- INSEE/Postal code: 16077 /16290
- ^{1} French Land Register data, which excludes lakes, ponds, glaciers > 1 km^{2} (0.386 sq mi or 247 acres) and river estuaries.

Champmillon (French pronunciation: [ʃɑ̃mijɔ̃]) is a commune in the Charente department in southwestern France.

== Population ==
Historical population
Year	Pop.	±% p.a.
1968	302	—
1975	346	+1.96%
1982	358	+0.49%
1990	449	+2.87%
1999	493	+1.04%
2007	533	+0.98%
2012	526	−0.26%
2017	501	−0.97%
2023	534	+1.07%
Source: INSEE

== See also ==
- Communes of the Charente department
