= Montigné =

- Part of Val-d'Auge
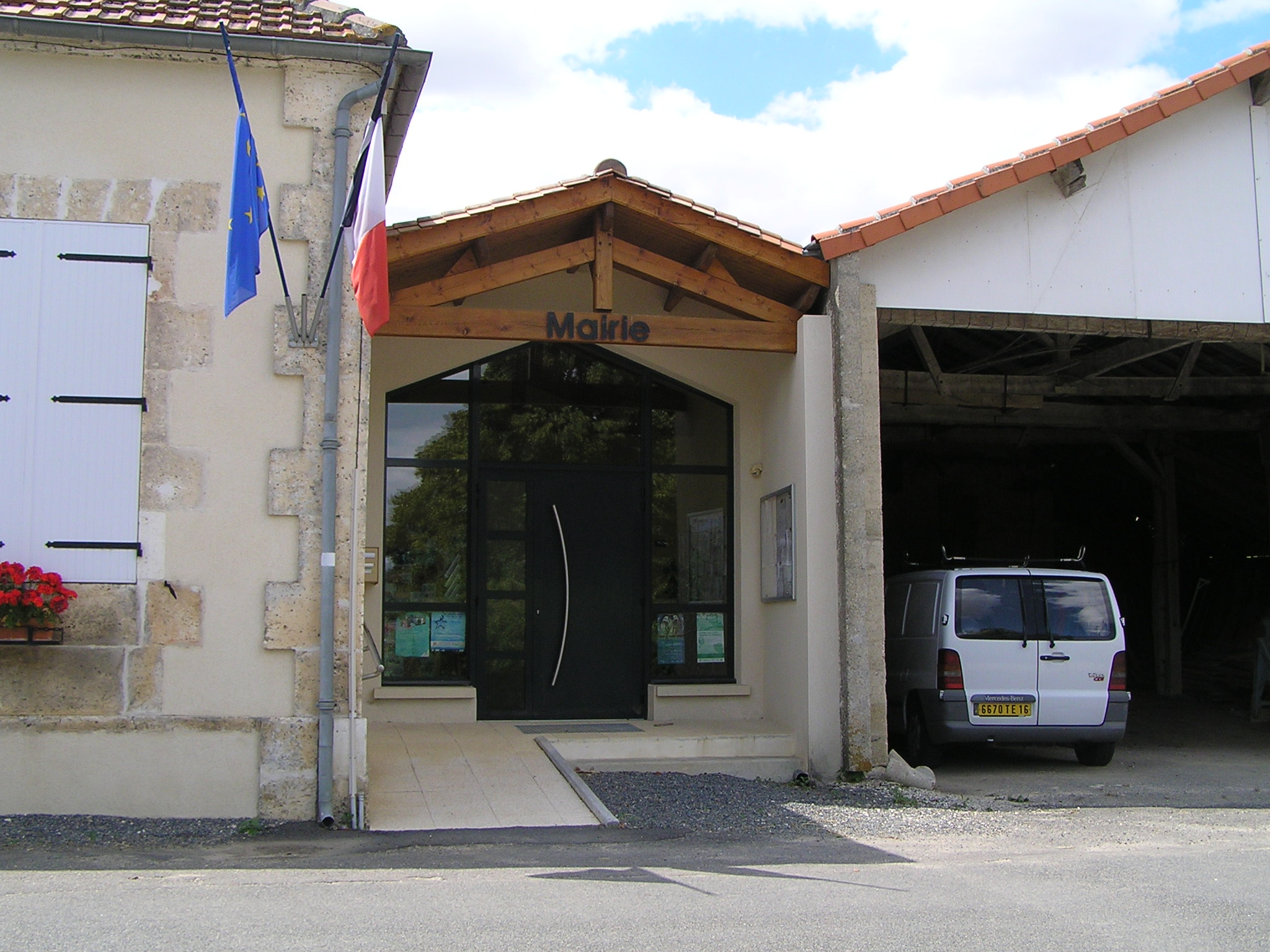
- Town hall
- Location of Montigné
- Location within France Location within Nouvelle-Aquitaine
- Coordinates: 45°49′25″N 0°04′38″W
- Country: France
- Region: Nouvelle-Aquitaine
- Department: Charente
- Arrondissement: Cognac
- Canton: Val de Nouère
- Commune: Val-d'Auge
- Area^{1}: 8.91 km^{2} (3.44 sq mi)
- Elevation: 140 m (460 ft)
- Highest elevation: 170 m (560 ft)
- Lowest elevation: 78 m (256 ft)
- Population (2023): 174
  - Density: 19.5/km^{2} (50.6/sq mi)
- Time zone: UTC+01:00 (CET)
  - Summer (DST): UTC+02:00 (CEST)
- Postal code: 16170
- ^{1} French Land Register data, which excludes lakes, ponds, glaciers > 1 km^{2} (0.386 sq mi or 247 acres) and river estuaries.

Montigné (French pronunciation: [mɔ̃tiɲe]) is a former commune in the Charente department in southwestern France. On 1 January 2019, it was merged into the new commune Val-d'Auge.

== See also ==
- Communes of the Charente department
