= Genac-Bignac =

- Commune
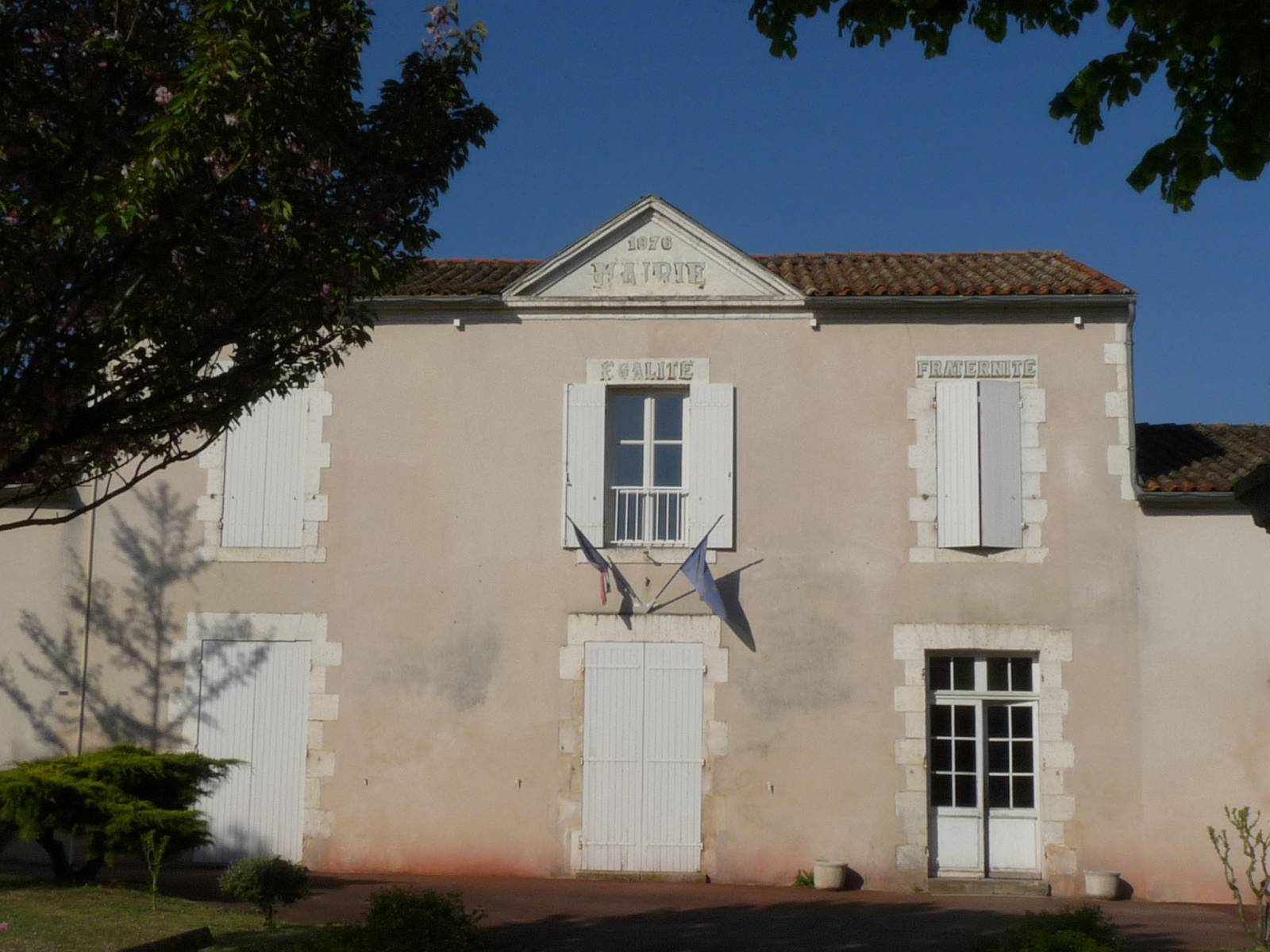
- The town hall in Genac-Bignac
- Location of Genac-Bignac
- Location within France Location within Nouvelle-Aquitaine
- Coordinates: 45°47′53″N 0°01′30″E
- Country: France
- Region: Nouvelle-Aquitaine
- Department: Charente
- Arrondissement: Cognac
- Canton: Val de Nouère

Government
  - Mayor (2020–2026): Franc Pinaud
- Area^{1}: 33.61 km^{2} (12.98 sq mi)
- Population (2023): 974
  - Density: 29.0/km^{2} (75.1/sq mi)
- Time zone: UTC+01:00 (CET)
  - Summer (DST): UTC+02:00 (CEST)
- INSEE/Postal code: 16148 /16170
- ^{1} French Land Register data, which excludes lakes, ponds, glaciers > 1 km^{2} (0.386 sq mi or 247 acres) and river estuaries.

Genac-Bignac (French pronunciation: [ʒənak biɲak]) is a commune in the Charente department of southwestern France. The municipality was established on 1 January 2016 and consists of the former communes of Genac and Bignac.

== See also ==
- Communes of the Charente department
