= Vindelle =

- Commune
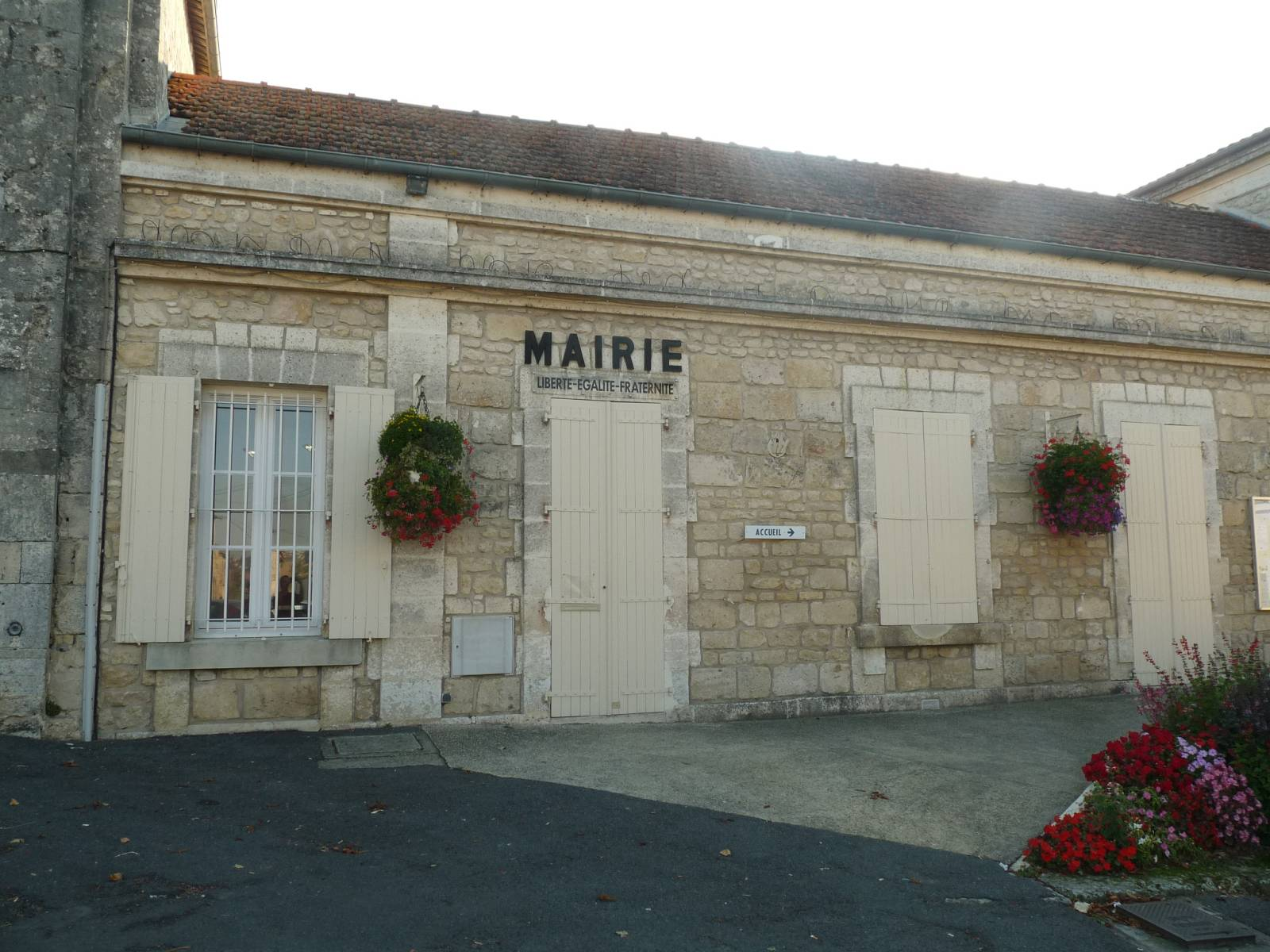
- Town hall
- Location of Vindelle
- Location within France Location within Nouvelle-Aquitaine
- Coordinates: 45°43′16″N 0°07′21″E
- Country: France
- Region: Nouvelle-Aquitaine
- Department: Charente
- Arrondissement: Angoulême
- Canton: Val de Nouère
- Intercommunality: Grand Angoulême

Government
  - Mayor (2020–2026): Isabelle Moufflet
- Area^{1}: 10.93 km^{2} (4.22 sq mi)
- Elevation: 60 m (200 ft)
- Highest elevation: 125 m (410 ft)
- Lowest elevation: 31 m (102 ft)
- Population (2023): 1,045
  - Density: 95.61/km^{2} (247.6/sq mi)
- Time zone: UTC+01:00 (CET)
  - Summer (DST): UTC+02:00 (CEST)
- INSEE/Postal code: 16415 /16430
- ^{1} French Land Register data, which excludes lakes, ponds, glaciers > 1 km^{2} (0.386 sq mi or 247 acres) and river estuaries.

Vindelle (French pronunciation: [vɛ̃dɛl]) is a commune in the Charente department in southwestern France.

== Population ==
Historical population
Year	Pop.	±% p.a.
1968	556	—
1975	643	+2.10%
1982	747	+2.16%
1990	933	+2.82%
1999	866	−0.82%
2007	956	+1.24%
2012	1,025	+1.40%
2017	1,075	+0.96%
2023	1,045	−0.47%
Source: INSEE

== See also ==
- Communes of the Charente department
