= Douzat =

- Commune
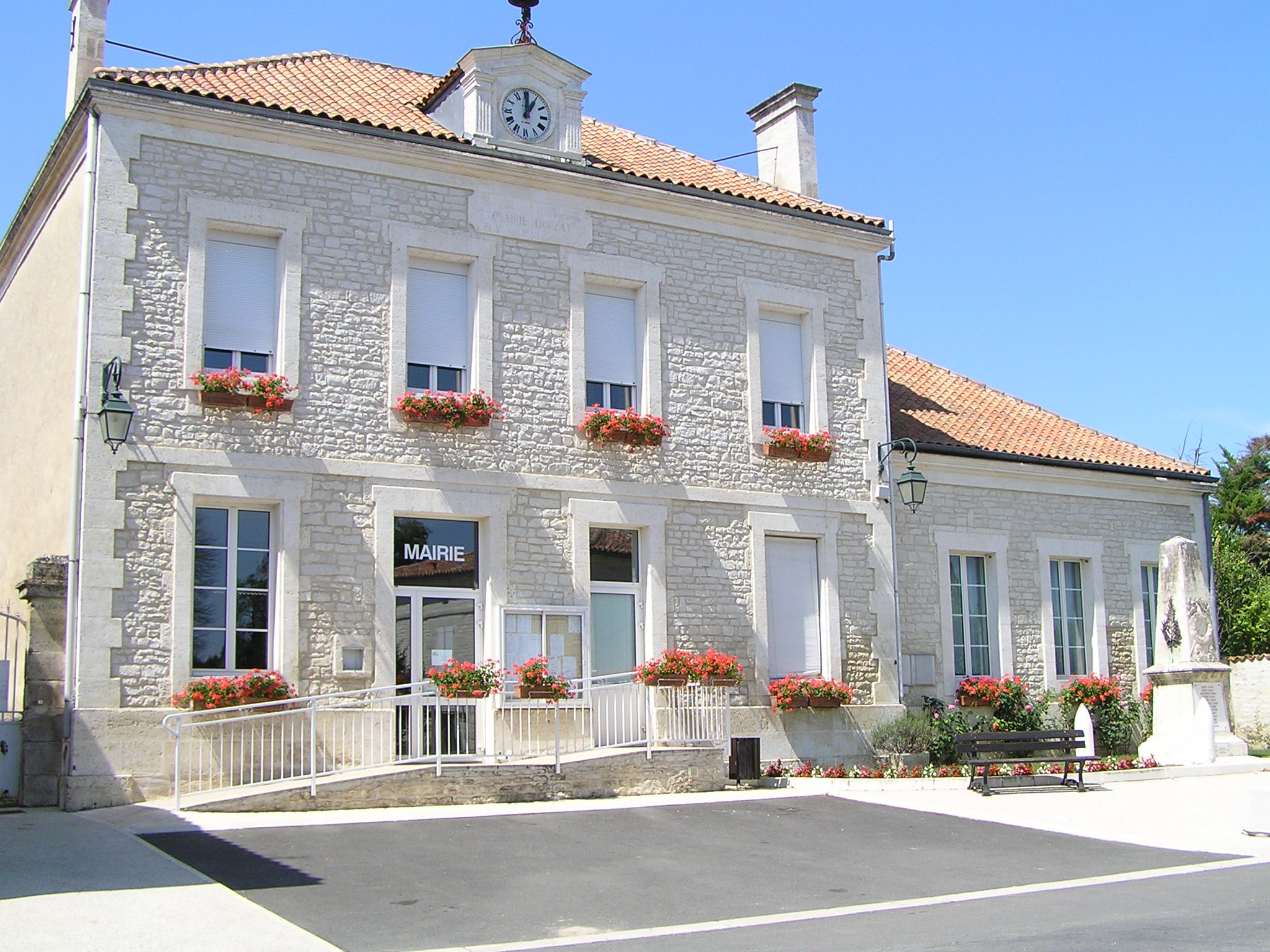
- Town hall
- Location of Douzat
- Location within France Location within Nouvelle-Aquitaine
- Coordinates: 45°42′44″N 0°00′07″E
- Country: France
- Region: Nouvelle-Aquitaine
- Department: Charente
- Arrondissement: Cognac
- Canton: Val de Nouère
- Intercommunality: Rouillacais

Government
  - Mayor (2020–2026): Pascal Burbaud
- Area^{1}: 11.48 km^{2} (4.43 sq mi)
- Elevation: 83 m (272 ft)
- Highest elevation: 115 m (377 ft)
- Lowest elevation: 51 m (167 ft)
- Population (2023): 438
  - Density: 38.2/km^{2} (98.8/sq mi)
- Time zone: UTC+01:00 (CET)
  - Summer (DST): UTC+02:00 (CEST)
- INSEE/Postal code: 16121 /16290
- ^{1} French Land Register data, which excludes lakes, ponds, glaciers > 1 km^{2} (0.386 sq mi or 247 acres) and river estuaries.

Douzat (French pronunciation: [duza]) is a commune in the Charente departement in southwestern France.

== Population ==
Historical population
Year	Pop.	±% p.a.
1968	322	—
1975	303	−0.87%
1982	332	+1.31%
1990	367	+1.26%
1999	344	−0.72%
2007	353	+0.32%
2012	449	+4.93%
2017	469	+0.88%
2023	438	−1.13%
Source: INSEE

== See also ==
- Communes of the Charente department
