= Marsac, Charente =

Marsac
- Commune
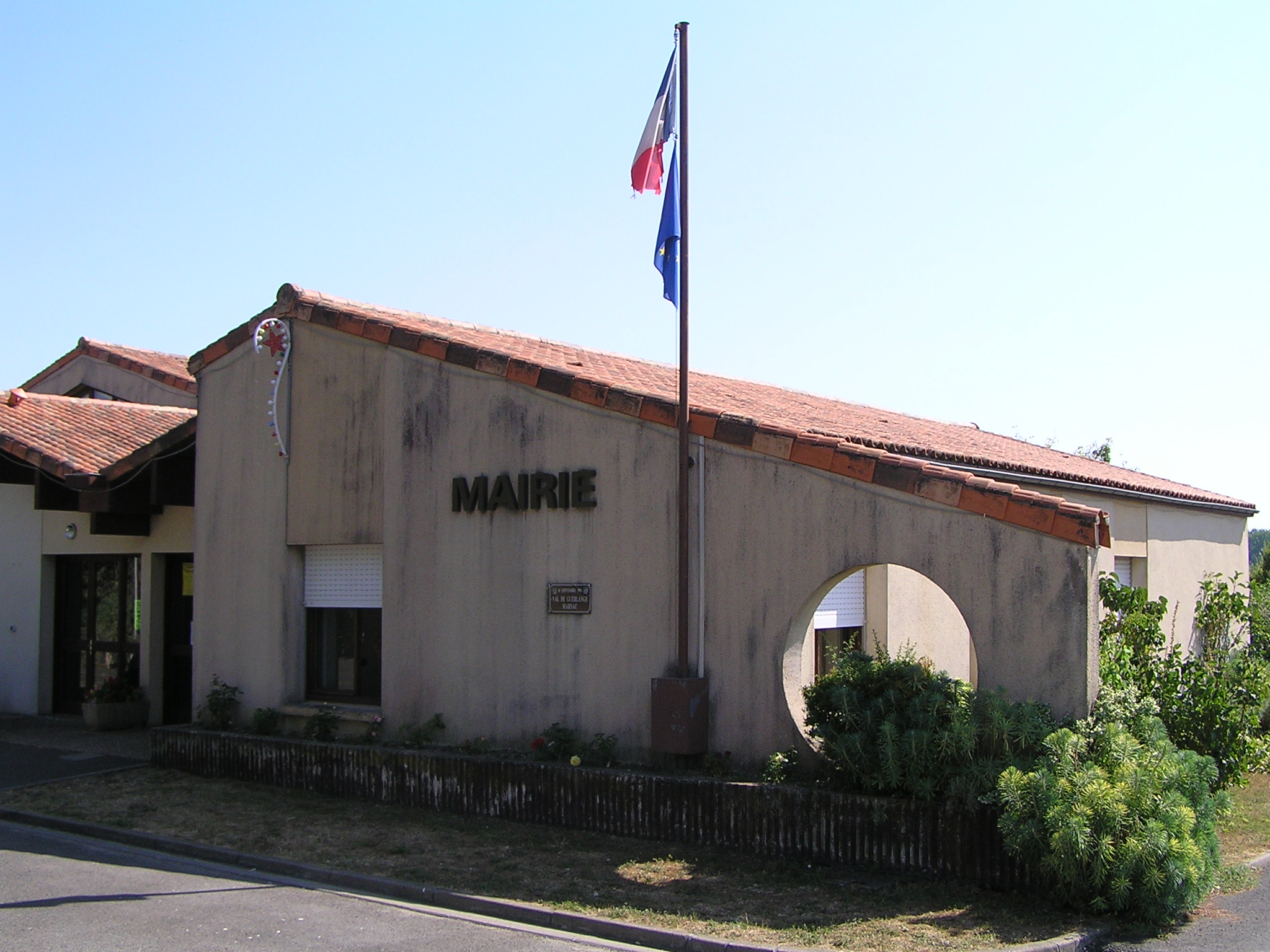
- Town hall

- Coat of arms
- Location of Marsac
- Location within France Location within Nouvelle-Aquitaine
- Coordinates: 45°44′32″N 0°04′45″E
- Country: France
- Region: Nouvelle-Aquitaine
- Department: Charente
- Arrondissement: Angoulême
- Canton: Val de Nouère
- Intercommunality: Grand Angoulême

Government
  - Mayor (2020–2026): Jean-Luc Fouchier
- Area^{1}: 13.34 km^{2} (5.15 sq mi)
- Elevation: 71 m (233 ft)
- Highest elevation: 143 m (469 ft)
- Lowest elevation: 35 m (115 ft)
- Population (2023): 742
  - Density: 55.6/km^{2} (144/sq mi)
- Time zone: UTC+01:00 (CET)
  - Summer (DST): UTC+02:00 (CEST)
- INSEE/Postal code: 16210 /16570
- ^{1} French Land Register data, which excludes lakes, ponds, glaciers > 1 km^{2} (0.386 sq mi or 247 acres) and river estuaries.

Marsac (French pronunciation: [maʁsak]) is a commune in the Charente department in southwestern France.

== Population ==
Historical population
Year	Pop.	±% p.a.
1968	505	—
1975	484	−0.60%
1982	600	+3.12%
1990	708	+2.09%
1999	720	+0.19%
2007	777	+0.96%
2012	834	+1.43%
2017	827	−0.17%
2023	742	−1.79%
Source: INSEE

== See also ==
- Communes of the Charente department
