= Marsac-en-Livradois =

- Commune
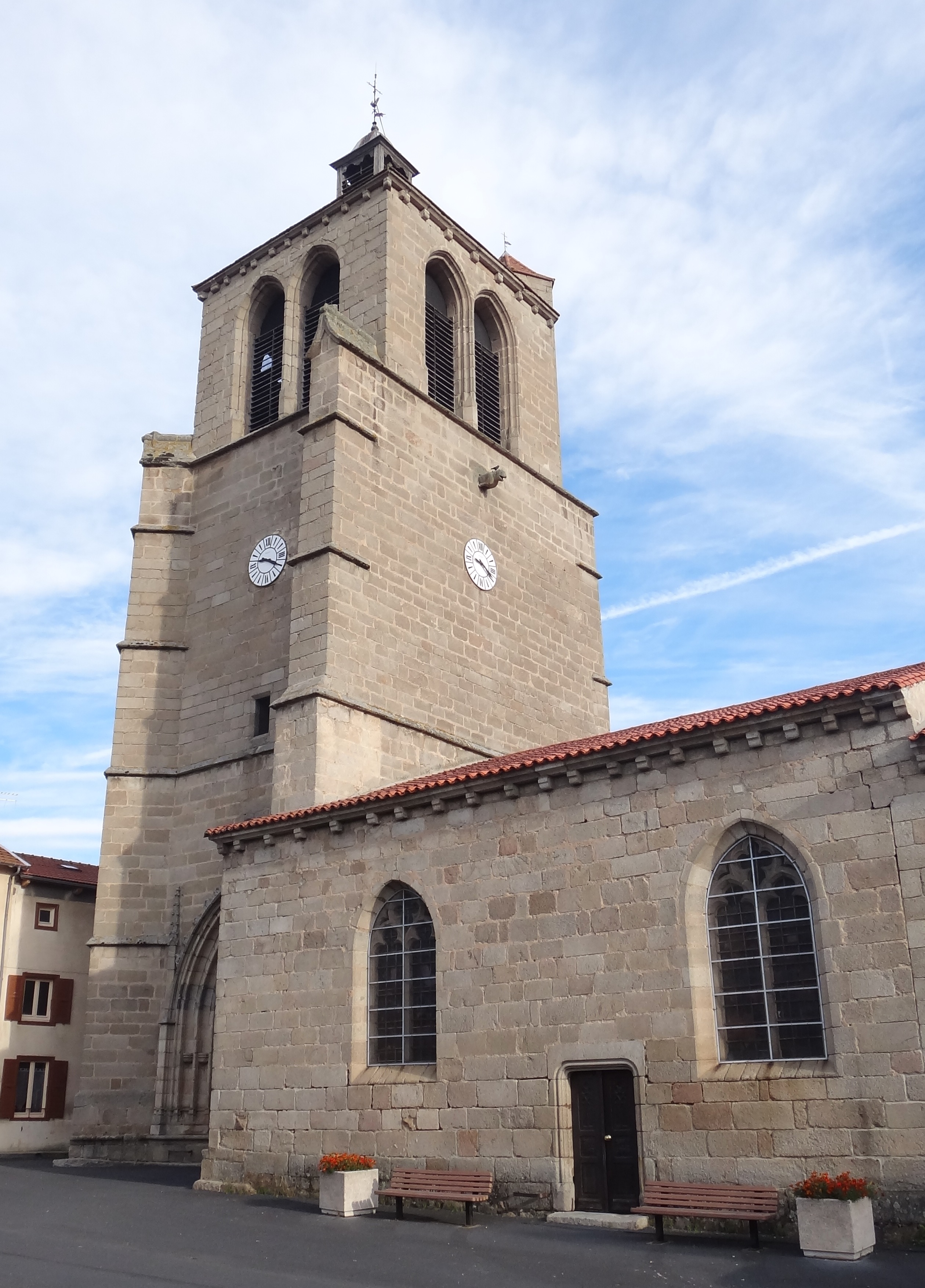
- The church in Marsac-en-Livradois

- Coat of arms
- Location of Marsac-en-Livradois
- Location within France Location within Auvergne-Rhône-Alpes
- Coordinates: 45°28′47″N 3°43′43″E
- Country: France
- Region: Auvergne-Rhône-Alpes
- Department: Puy-de-Dôme
- Arrondissement: Ambert
- Canton: Ambert
- Intercommunality: CC Ambert Livradois Forez

Government
  - Mayor (2020–2026): Michel Sauvade
- Area^{1}: 48.46 km^{2} (18.71 sq mi)
- Elevation: 543 m (1,781 ft)
- Highest elevation: 1,041 m (3,415 ft)
- Lowest elevation: 531 m (1,742 ft)
- Population (2023): 1,381
  - Density: 28.50/km^{2} (73.81/sq mi)
- Time zone: UTC+01:00 (CET)
  - Summer (DST): UTC+02:00 (CEST)
- INSEE/Postal code: 63211 /63940
- ^{1} French Land Register data, which excludes lakes, ponds, glaciers > 1 km^{2} (0.386 sq mi or 247 acres) and river estuaries.

Marsac-en-Livradois is a commune in the Puy-de-Dôme department in Auvergne in central France.

== Notable people ==
- Jacques Friteyre-Durvé (1725–1792), Jesuit

== See also ==
- Communes of the Puy-de-Dôme department
