= Linars =

- Commune
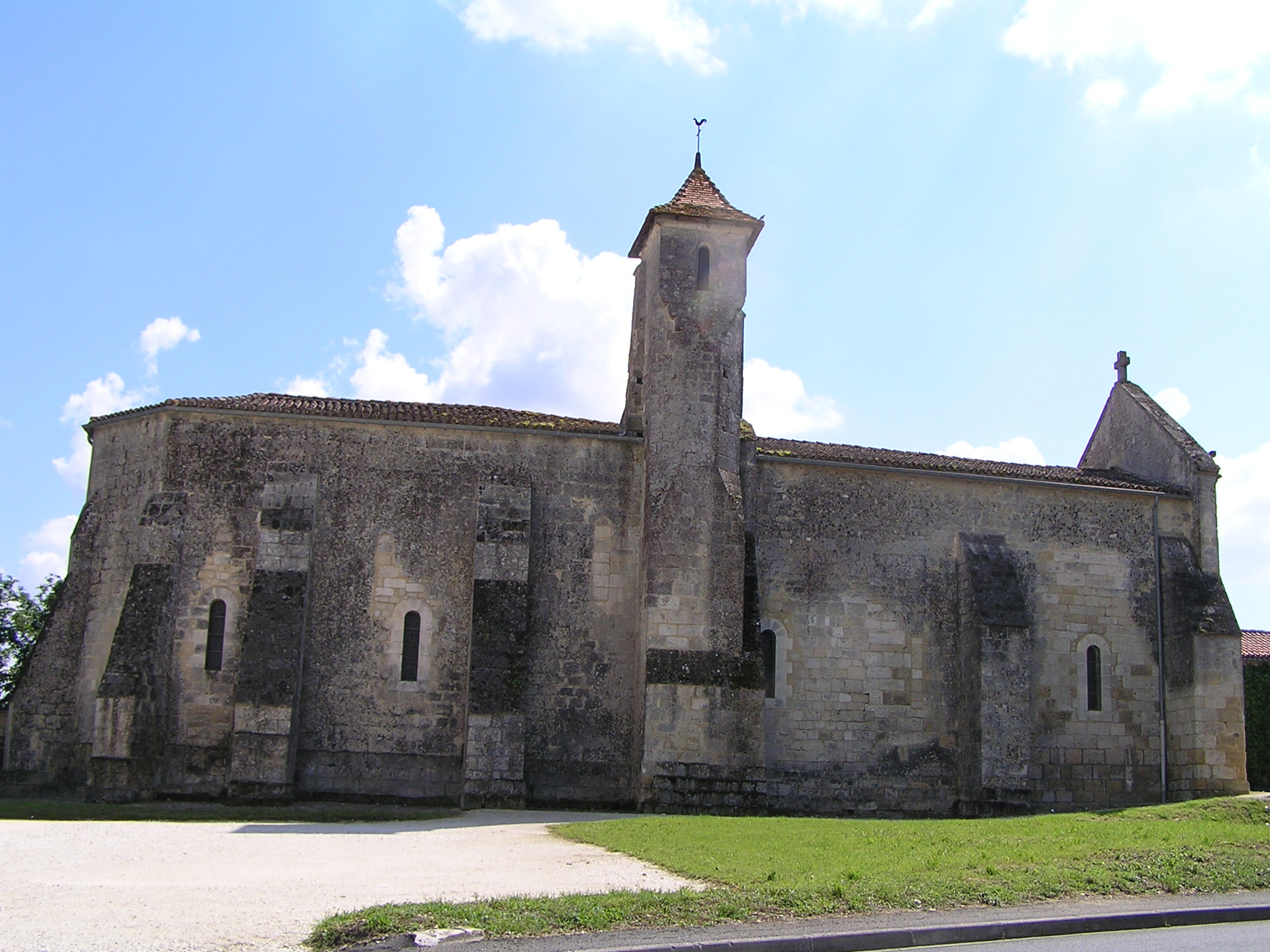
- The church in Linars
- Location of Linars
- Location within France Location within Nouvelle-Aquitaine
- Coordinates: 45°39′30″N 0°05′08″E
- Country: France
- Region: Nouvelle-Aquitaine
- Department: Charente
- Arrondissement: Angoulême
- Canton: Val de Nouère
- Intercommunality: Grand Angoulême

Government
  - Mayor (2020–2026): Michel Germaneau
- Area^{1}: 5.97 km^{2} (2.31 sq mi)
- Elevation: 100 m (330 ft)
- Highest elevation: 82 m (269 ft)
- Lowest elevation: 25 m (82 ft)
- Population (2023): 2,115
  - Density: 354/km^{2} (918/sq mi)
- Time zone: UTC+01:00 (CET)
  - Summer (DST): UTC+02:00 (CEST)
- INSEE/Postal code: 16187 /16730
- ^{1} French Land Register data, which excludes lakes, ponds, glaciers > 1 km^{2} (0.386 sq mi or 247 acres) and river estuaries.

Linars (French pronunciation: [linaʁ]) is a commune in the Charente department in southwestern France.

== Population ==
Historical population

Year	Pop.	±% p.a.
1793	628	—
1800	647	+0.43%
1806	630	−0.44%
1821	566	−0.71%
1831	590	+0.42%
1841	473	−2.19%
1846	500	+1.12%
1851	501	+0.04%
1856	477	−0.98%
1861	469	−0.34%
1866	454	−0.65%
1872	465	+0.40%
1876	448	−0.93%
1881	448	+0.00%
1886	471	+1.01%
1891	480	+0.38%
1896	411	−3.06%
1901	464	+2.46%

Year	Pop.	±% p.a.
1906	506	+1.75%
1911	506	+0.00%
1921	478	−0.57%
1926	492	+0.58%
1931	506	+0.56%
1936	528	+0.85%
1946	595	+1.20%
1954	582	−0.28%
1962	726	+2.80%
1968	852	+2.70%
1975	1,667	+10.06%
1982	2,208	+4.10%
1990	2,193	−0.09%
1999	2,110	−0.43%
2007	2,068	−0.25%
2012	2,073	+0.05%
2017	2,078	+0.05%
2023	2,115	+0.29%

Source: EHESS and INSEE (1968-2023)

== See also ==
- Communes of the Charente department
