= Saint-Saturnin, Charente =

Saint-Saturnin
- Commune
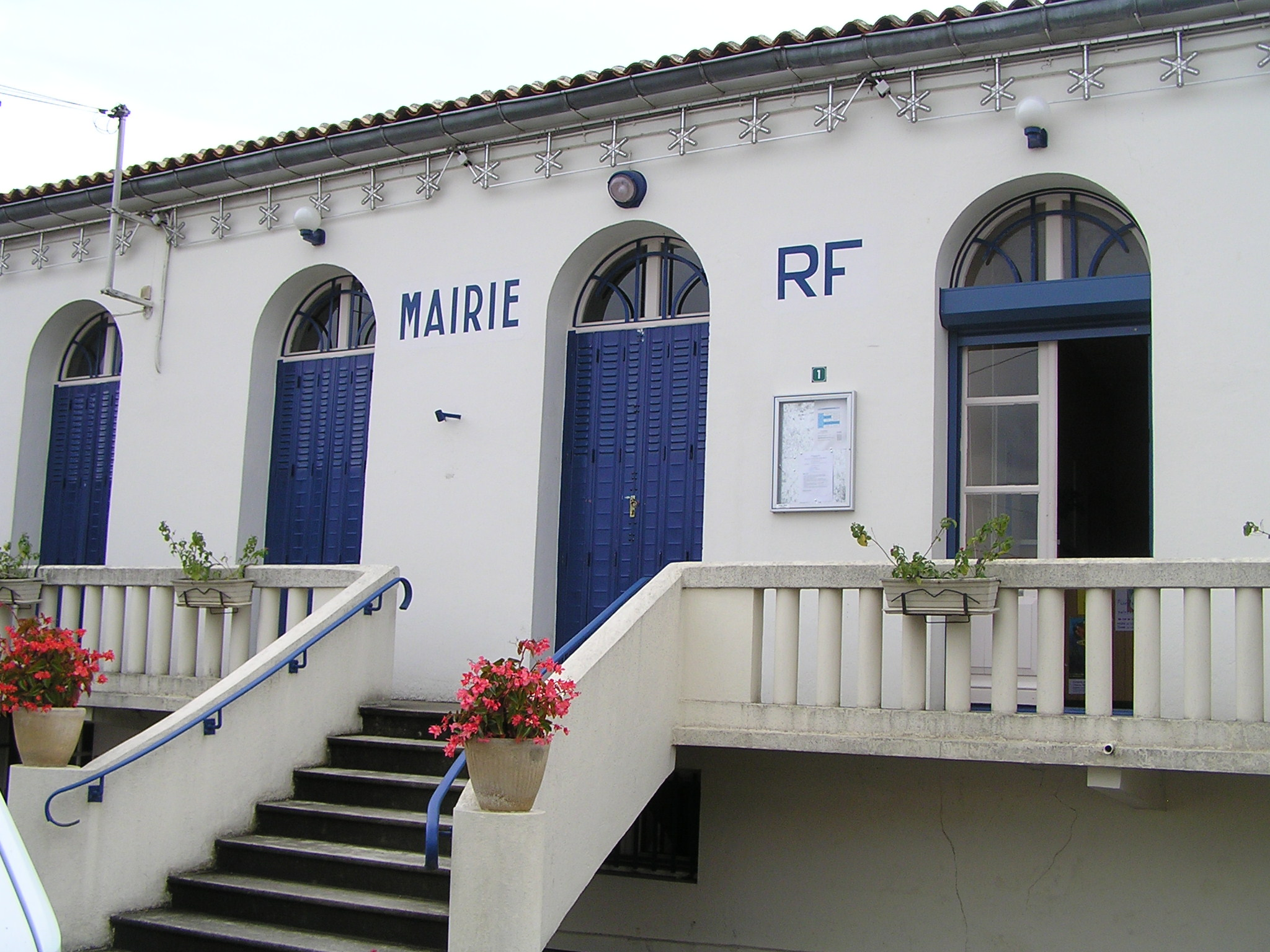
- Town hall
- Location of Saint-Saturnin
- Location within France Location within Nouvelle-Aquitaine
- Coordinates: 45°39′41″N 0°02′44″E
- Country: France
- Region: Nouvelle-Aquitaine
- Department: Charente
- Arrondissement: Angoulême
- Canton: Val de Nouère
- Intercommunality: Grand Angoulême

Government
  - Mayor (2022–2026): Catherine Brie
- Area^{1}: 13.38 km^{2} (5.17 sq mi)
- Elevation: 102 m (335 ft)
- Highest elevation: 114 m (374 ft)
- Lowest elevation: 32 m (105 ft)
- Population (2023): 1,284
  - Density: 95.96/km^{2} (248.5/sq mi)
- Time zone: UTC+01:00 (CET)
  - Summer (DST): UTC+02:00 (CEST)
- INSEE/Postal code: 16348 /16290
- ^{1} French Land Register data, which excludes lakes, ponds, glaciers > 1 km^{2} (0.386 sq mi or 247 acres) and river estuaries.

Saint-Saturnin (French pronunciation: [sɛ̃ satyʁnɛ̃]) is a commune in the Charente department in southwestern France.

== Population ==
Historical population
Year	Pop.	±% p.a.
1968	619	—
1975	651	+0.72%
1982	820	+3.35%
1990	1,083	+3.54%
1999	1,159	+0.76%
2007	1,295	+1.40%
2012	1,317	+0.34%
2017	1,292	−0.38%
2023	1,284	−0.10%
Source: INSEE

== See also ==
- Communes of the Charente department
