= Hiersac =

- Commune
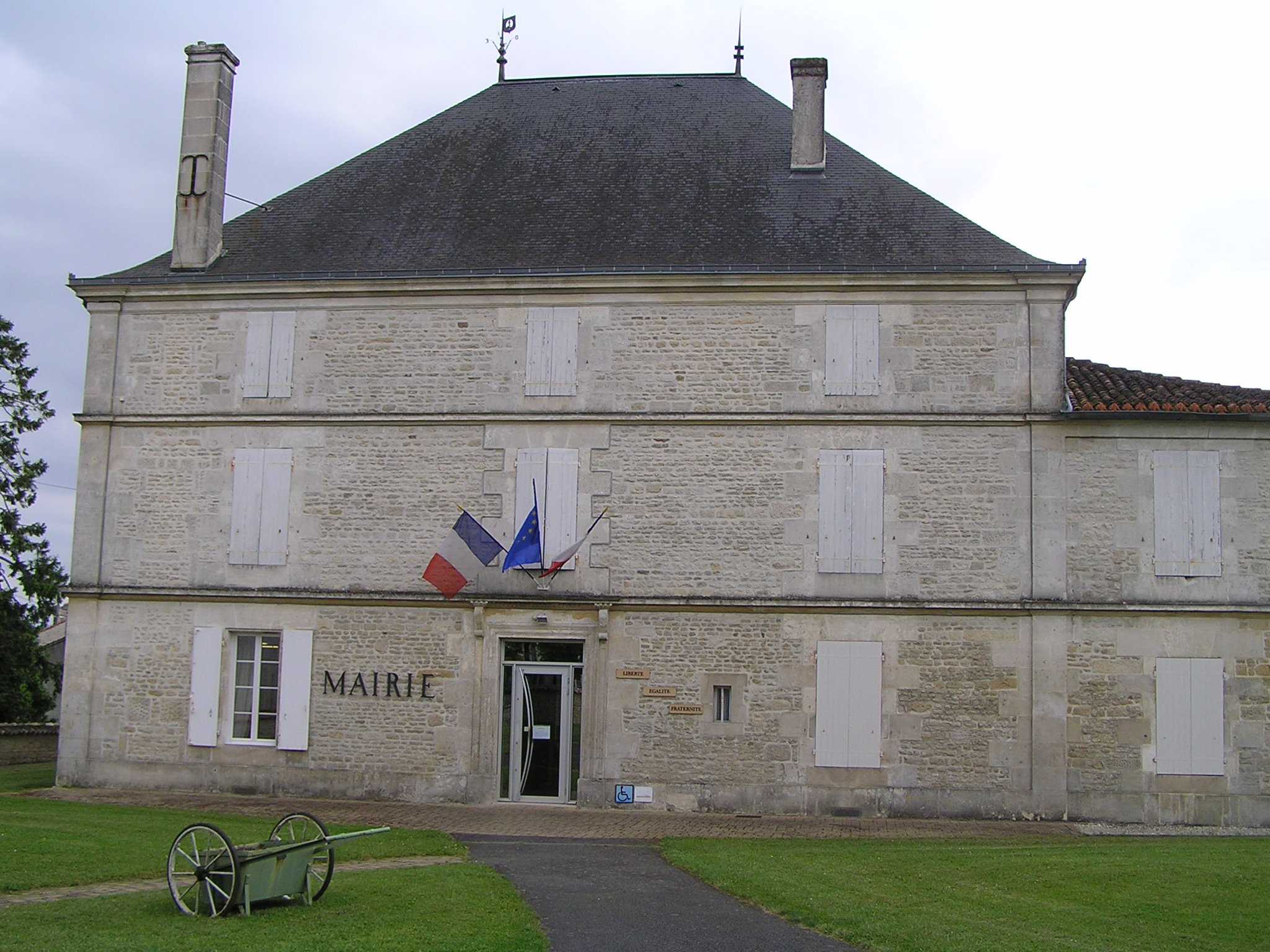
- Town hall
- Location of Hiersac
- Location within France Location within Nouvelle-Aquitaine
- Coordinates: 45°40′10″N 0°00′20″E
- Country: France
- Region: Nouvelle-Aquitaine
- Department: Charente
- Arrondissement: Cognac
- Canton: Val de Nouère
- Intercommunality: CA Grand Cognac

Government
  - Mayor (2020–2026): Martine Beaumard
- Area^{1}: 7.36 km^{2} (2.84 sq mi)
- Elevation: 63 m (207 ft)
- Highest elevation: 121 m (397 ft)
- Lowest elevation: 43 m (141 ft)
- Population (2023): 1,142
  - Density: 155/km^{2} (402/sq mi)
- Time zone: UTC+01:00 (CET)
  - Summer (DST): UTC+02:00 (CEST)
- INSEE/Postal code: 16163 /16290
- ^{1} French Land Register data, which excludes lakes, ponds, glaciers > 1 km^{2} (0.386 sq mi or 247 acres) and river estuaries.

Hiersac (French pronunciation: [jɛʁsak]) is a commune in the Charente department in southwestern France.

== Population ==
Historical population
Year	Pop.	±% p.a.
1968	692	—
1975	798	+2.06%
1982	850	+0.91%
1990	966	+1.61%
1999	1,005	+0.44%
2007	1,074	+0.83%
2012	1,050	−0.45%
2017	1,101	+0.95%
2023	1,142	+0.61%
Source: INSEE

== Personalities ==
- Jean-André Valletaux, French general in the French Revolutionary Wars and the Peninsular War

== See also ==
- Communes of the Charente department
