= Canton of Val de Nouère =

Coordinates: 45.65°N 0.08°E

- Canton
- Situation of the canton of Val de Nouère in the department of Charente
- Country: France
- Region: Nouvelle-Aquitaine
- Department: Charente
- No. of communes: {{{nbcomm}}}
- Population (2023): 20,745
- INSEE code: 1618

The canton of Val de Nouère is an administrative division of the Charente department, southwestern France. It was created at the French canton reorganisation which came into effect in March 2015. Its seat is in Linars.

It consists of the following communes:

1. Asnières-sur-Nouère
2. Champmillon
3. Courbillac
4. Douzat
5. Échallat
6. Genac-Bignac
7. Hiersac
8. Linars
9. Marcillac-Lanville
10. Mareuil
11. Marsac
12. Mons
13. Moulidars
14. Rouillac
15. Saint-Amant-de-Nouère
16. Saint-Cybardeaux
17. Saint-Genis-d'Hiersac
18. Saint-Saturnin
19. Sireuil
20. Trois-Palis
21. Val-d'Auge
22. Vaux-Rouillac
23. Vindelle
