= Pérignac =

Pérignac may refer to the following places in France:

- Pérignac, Charente, a commune in the department of Charente
- Pérignac, Charente-Maritime, a commune in the department of Charente-Maritime
