= Arrondissement of Cognac =

Coordinates: 45°41′N 0°20′W

Cognac
- Arrondissement
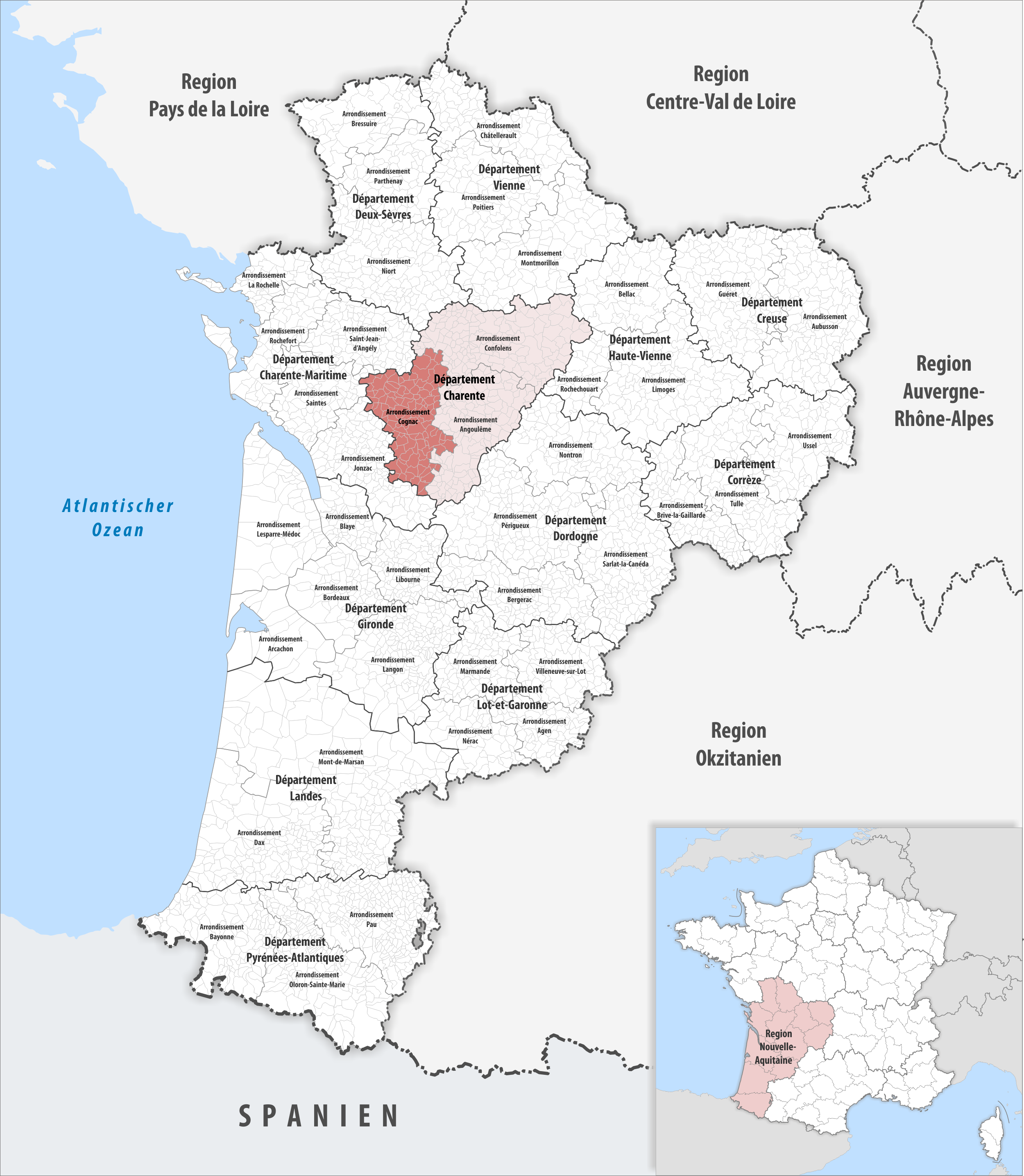
- Location within the region Nouvelle-Aquitaine
- Country: France
- Region: Nouvelle-Aquitaine
- Department: Charente
- No. of communes: {{{nbcomm}}}
- Area: 1,670.8 km^{2} (645.1 sq mi)
- Population (2023): 99,106
  - Density: 59.316/km^{2} (153.63/sq mi)
- INSEE code: 162

The arrondissement of Cognac is an arrondissement of France in the Charente department in the Nouvelle-Aquitaine region. It has 107 communes. Its population is 98,683 (2021), and its area is 1,670.8 km^{2} (645.1 sq mi).

== Composition ==
The communes of the arrondissement of Cognac, and their INSEE codes, are:

1. Angeac-Champagne (16012)
2. Angeac-Charente (16013)
3. Angeduc (16014)
4. Ars (16018)
5. Baignes-Sainte-Radegonde (16025)
6. Barbezieux-Saint-Hilaire (16028)
7. Barret (16030)
8. Bassac (16032)
9. Bécheresse (16036)
10. Bellevigne (16204)
11. Berneuil (16040)
12. Birac (16045)
13. Boisbreteau (16048)
14. Bonneuil (16050)
15. Bors-de-Baignes (16053)
16. Bourg-Charente (16056)
17. Bouteville (16057)
18. Boutiers-Saint-Trojan (16058)
19. Bréville (16060)
20. Brie-sous-Barbezieux (16062)
21. Brossac (16066)
22. Challignac (16074)
23. Champagne-Vigny (16075)
24. Champmillon (16077)
25. Chantillac (16079)
26. Chassors (16088)
27. Châteaubernard (16089)
28. Châteauneuf-sur-Charente (16090)
29. Chillac (16099)
30. Cognac (16102)
31. Condéon (16105)
32. Coteaux du Blanzacais (16046)
33. Courbillac (16109)
34. Criteuil-la-Magdeleine (16116)
35. Douzat (16121)
36. Échallat (16123)
37. Étriac (16133)
38. Fleurac (16139)
39. Foussignac (16145)
40. Genac-Bignac (16148)
41. Gensac-la-Pallue (16150)
42. Genté (16151)
43. Gimeux (16152)
44. Graves-Saint-Amant (16297)
45. Guimps (16160)
46. Guizengeard (16161)
47. Hiersac (16163)
48. Houlette (16165)
49. Jarnac (16167)
50. Javrezac (16169)
51. Juillac-le-Coq (16171)
52. Julienne (16174)
53. Lachaise (16176)
54. Ladiville (16177)
55. Lagarde-sur-le-Né (16178)
56. Lignières-Ambleville (16186)
57. Louzac-Saint-André (16193)
58. Mainxe-Gondeville (16153)
59. Marcillac-Lanville (16207)
60. Mareuil (16208)
61. Mérignac (16216)
62. Merpins (16217)
63. Mesnac (16218)
64. Les Métairies (16220)
65. Mons (16221)
66. Montmérac (16224)
67. Mosnac-Saint-Simeux (16233)
68. Moulidars (16234)
69. Nercillac (16243)
70. Oriolles (16251)
71. Passirac (16256)
72. Pérignac (16258)
73. Reignac (16276)
74. Réparsac (16277)
75. Rouillac (16286)
76. Saint-Amant-de-Nouère (16298)
77. Saint-Aulais-la-Chapelle (16301)
78. Saint-Bonnet (16303)
79. Saint-Brice (16304)
80. Saint-Cybardeaux (16312)
81. Sainte-Sévère (16349)
82. Sainte-Souline (16354)
83. Saint-Félix (16315)
84. Saint-Fort-sur-le-Né (16316)
85. Saint-Genis-d'Hiersac (16320)
86. Saint-Laurent-de-Cognac (16330)
87. Saint-Médard (16338)
88. Saint-Même-les-Carrières (16340)
89. Saint-Palais-du-Né (16342)
90. Saint-Preuil (16343)
91. Saint-Simon (16352)
92. Saint-Vallier (16357)
93. Salles-d'Angles (16359)
94. Salles-de-Barbezieux (16360)
95. Sauvignac (16365)
96. Segonzac (16366)
97. Sigogne (16369)
98. Le Tâtre (16380)
99. Touvérac (16384)
100. Triac-Lautrait (16387)
101. Val-d'Auge (16339)
102. Val-de-Cognac (16097)
103. Val-des-Vignes (16175)
104. Vaux-Rouillac (16395)
105. Verrières (16399)
106. Vibrac (16402)
107. Vignolles (16405)

== History ==
The arrondissement of Cognac was created in 1800. On 1 January 2008 the canton of Rouillac that previously belonged to the arrondissement of Angoulême was added to the arrondissement of Cognac. At the January 2017 reorganisation of the arrondissements of Charente, it gained 14 communes from the arrondissement of Angoulême, and it lost two communes to the arrondissement of Angoulême.

As a result of the reorganisation of the cantons of France which came into effect in 2015, the borders of the cantons are no longer related to the borders of the arrondissements. The cantons of the arrondissement of Cognac were, as of January 2015:

1. Baignes-Sainte-Radegonde
2. Barbezieux-Saint-Hilaire
3. Brossac
4. Châteauneuf-sur-Charente
5. Cognac-Nord
6. Cognac-Sud
7. Jarnac
8. Rouillac
9. Segonzac

== Sub-prefects ==
- Dominique Vian : 1984-1986, commissaire adjoint de la République de l’arrondissement de Cognac
