= Berneuil =

Berneuil may refer to the following places in France:

- Berneuil, Charente, a commune in the department of Charente
- Berneuil, Charente-Maritime, a commune in the department of Charente-Maritime
- Berneuil, Somme, a commune in the department of Somme
- Berneuil, Haute-Vienne, a commune in the department of Haute-Vienne
- Berneuil-en-Bray, a commune in the department of Oise
- Berneuil-sur-Aisne, a commune in the department of Oise
