= Saint-Aulais-la-Chapelle =

- Commune
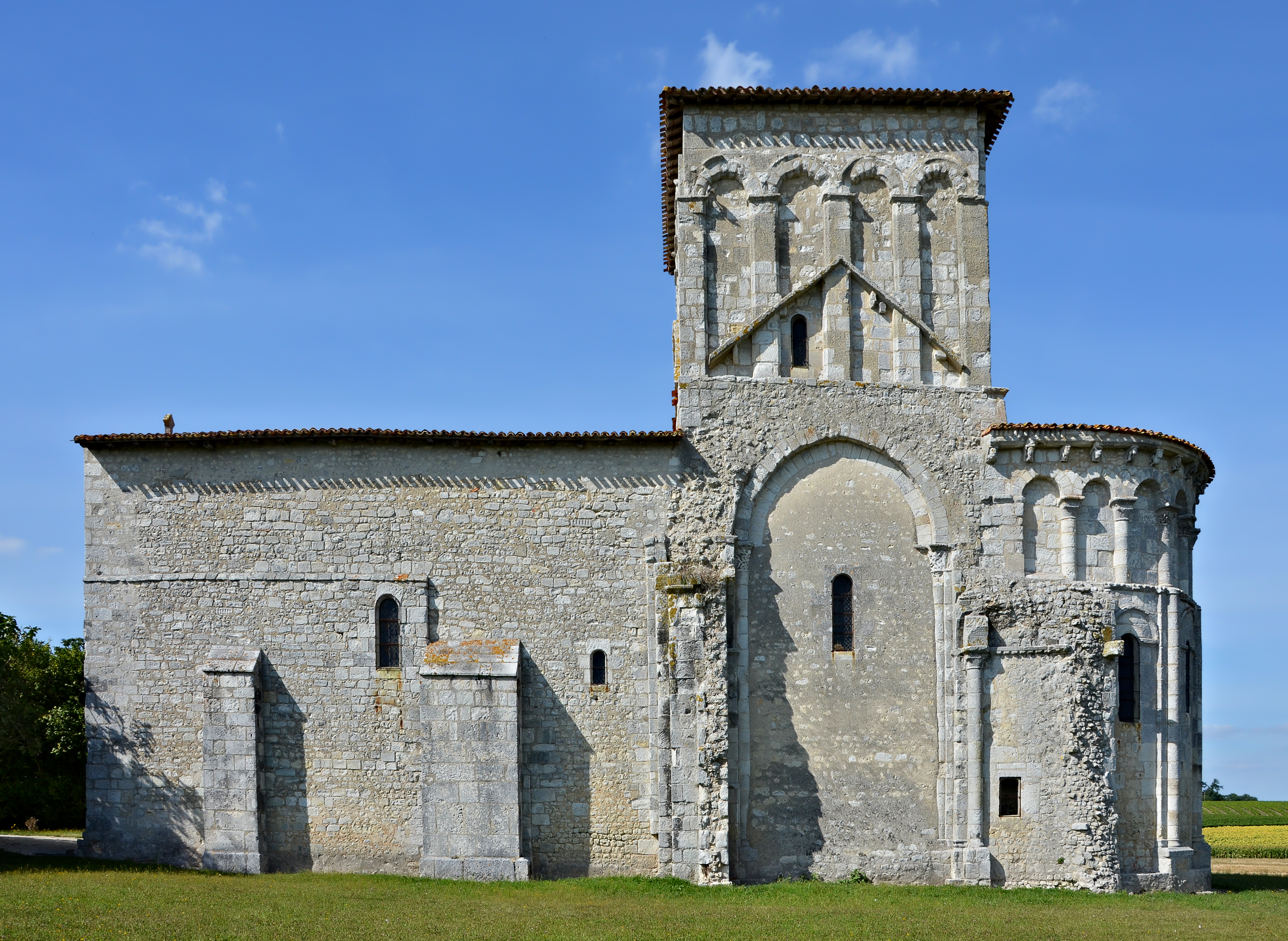
- The church of Conzac
- Location of Saint-Aulais-la-Chapelle
- Location within France Location within Nouvelle-Aquitaine
- Coordinates: 45°26′56″N 0°02′54″W
- Country: France
- Region: Nouvelle-Aquitaine
- Department: Charente
- Arrondissement: Cognac
- Canton: Charente-Sud
- Intercommunality: 4B Sud-Charente

Government
  - Mayor (2020–2026): Patrick Huneau
- Area^{1}: 14.84 km^{2} (5.73 sq mi)
- Elevation: 65 m (213 ft)
- Highest elevation: 128 m (420 ft)
- Lowest elevation: 60 m (200 ft)
- Population (2023): 219
  - Density: 14.8/km^{2} (38.2/sq mi)
- Time zone: UTC+01:00 (CET)
  - Summer (DST): UTC+02:00 (CEST)
- INSEE/Postal code: 16301 /16300
- ^{1} French Land Register data, which excludes lakes, ponds, glaciers > 1 km^{2} (0.386 sq mi or 247 acres) and river estuaries.

Saint-Aulais-la-Chapelle is a commune in the Charente department in southwestern France.

== Population ==
Historical population
Year	Pop.	±% p.a.
1968	350	—
1975	325	−1.05%
1982	294	−1.42%
1990	264	−1.34%
1999	233	−1.38%
2007	238	+0.27%
2012	231	−0.60%
2017	233	+0.17%
2023	219	−1.03%
Source: INSEE

== See also ==
- Communes of the Charente department
