= Lachaise =

- Commune
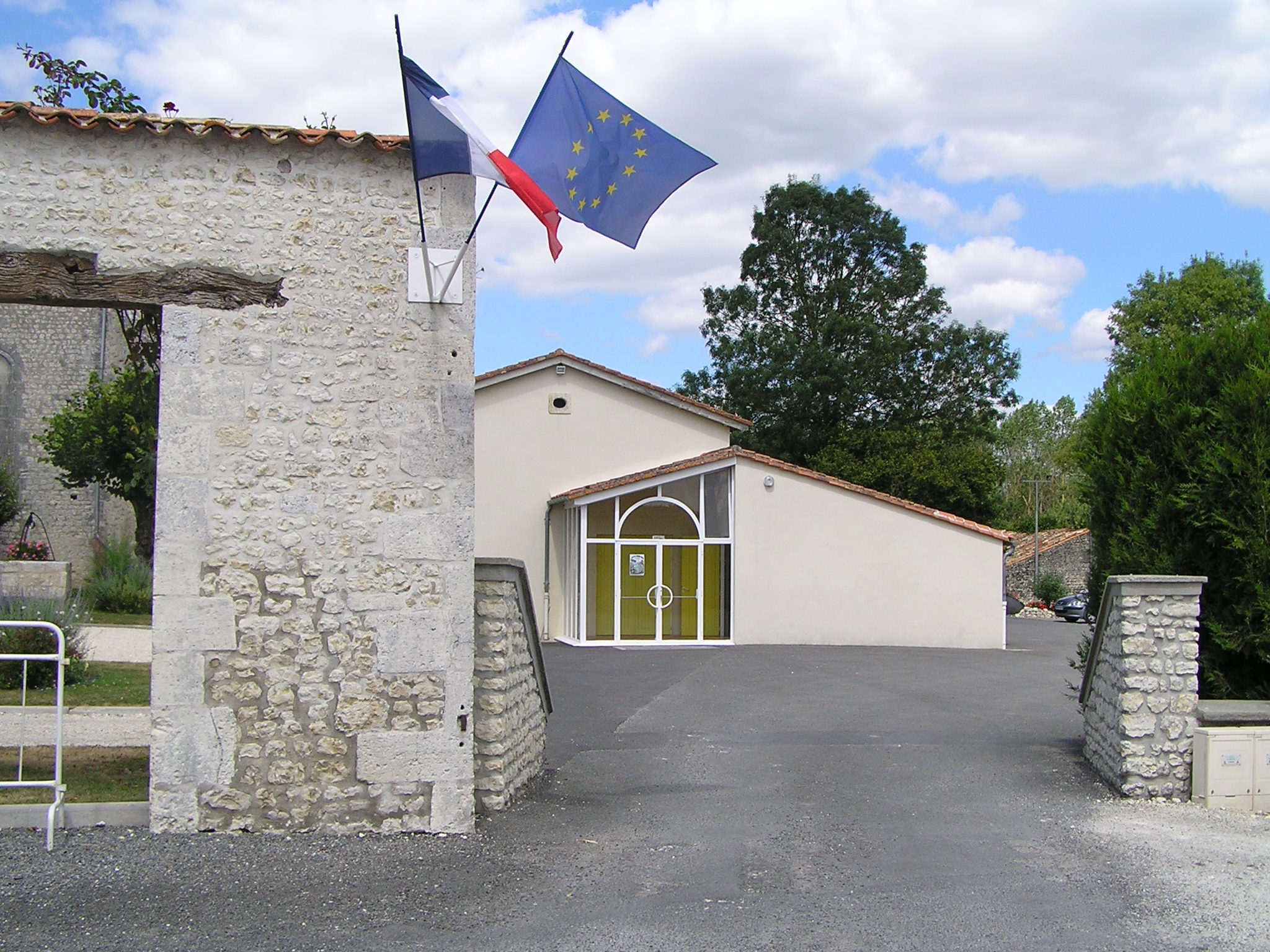
- Town hall
- Location of Lachaise
- Location within France Location within Nouvelle-Aquitaine
- Coordinates: 45°31′21″N 0°14′14″W
- Country: France
- Region: Nouvelle-Aquitaine
- Department: Charente
- Arrondissement: Cognac
- Canton: Charente-Sud
- Intercommunality: 4B Sud-Charente

Government
  - Mayor (2020–2026): Pascal Bonnaud
- Area^{1}: 9.43 km^{2} (3.64 sq mi)
- Elevation: 38 m (125 ft)
- Highest elevation: 68 m (223 ft)
- Lowest elevation: 27 m (89 ft)
- Population (2023): 318
  - Density: 33.7/km^{2} (87.3/sq mi)
- Time zone: UTC+01:00 (CET)
  - Summer (DST): UTC+02:00 (CEST)
- INSEE/Postal code: 16176 /16300
- ^{1} French Land Register data, which excludes lakes, ponds, glaciers > 1 km^{2} (0.386 sq mi or 247 acres) and river estuaries.

Lachaise (French pronunciation: [laʃɛz]) is a commune in the Charente department in southwestern France.

== Population ==
Historical population
Year	Pop.	±% p.a.
1968	281	—
1975	266	−0.78%
1982	281	+0.79%
1990	275	−0.27%
1999	288	+0.51%
2007	285	−0.13%
2012	323	+2.53%
2017	319	−0.25%
2023	318	−0.05%
Source: INSEE

== See also ==
- Communes of the Charente department
