= Vignolles =

- Commune
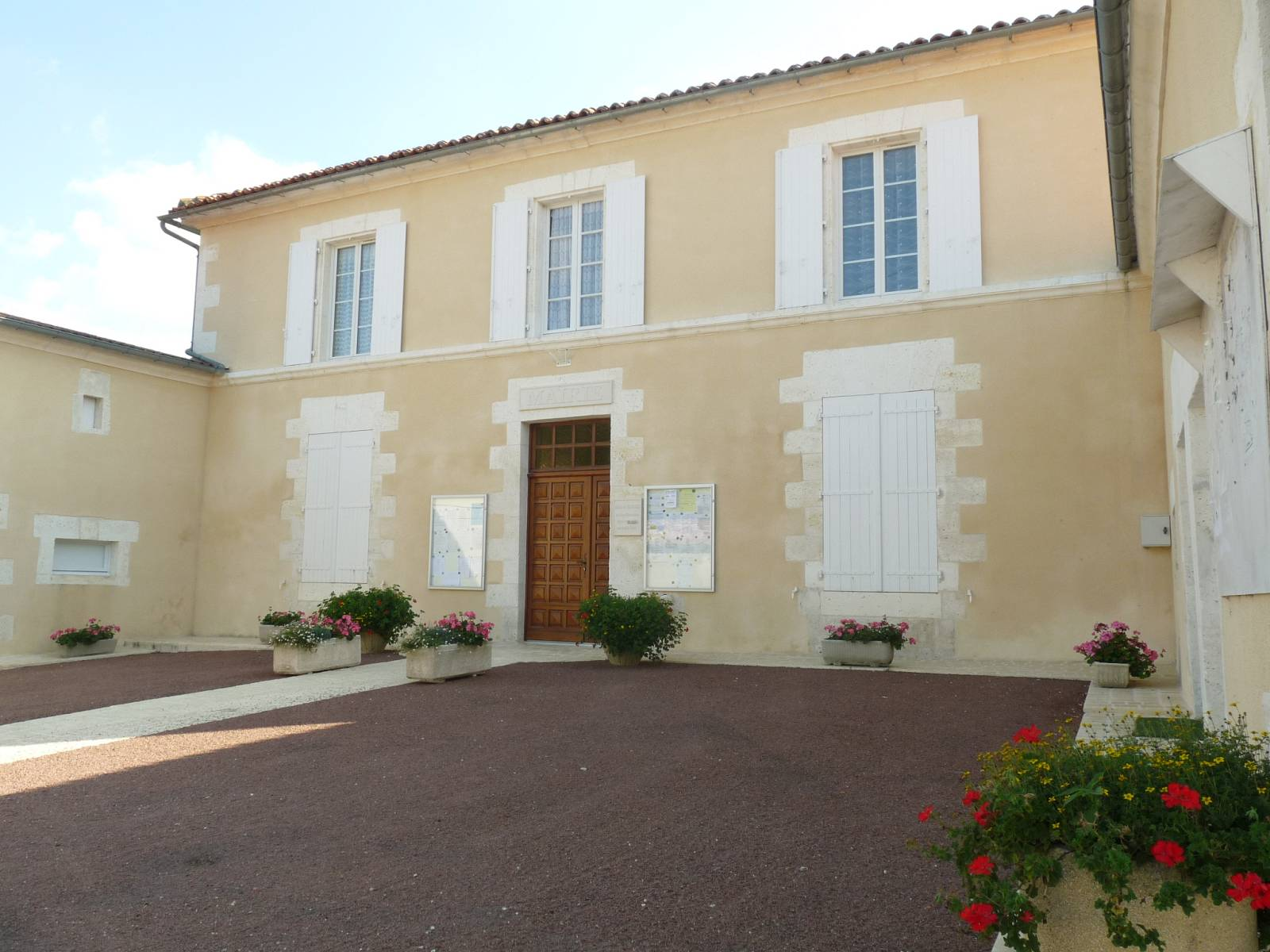
- Town hall
- Location of Vignolles
- Location within France Location within Nouvelle-Aquitaine
- Coordinates: 45°30′38″N 0°05′15″W
- Country: France
- Region: Nouvelle-Aquitaine
- Department: Charente
- Arrondissement: Cognac
- Canton: Charente-Sud
- Intercommunality: 4B Sud-Charente

Government
  - Mayor (2020–2026): Patrick Bobe
- Area^{1}: 8.80 km^{2} (3.40 sq mi)
- Elevation: 100 m (330 ft)
- Highest elevation: 116 m (381 ft)
- Lowest elevation: 41 m (135 ft)
- Population (2023): 170
  - Density: 19/km^{2} (50/sq mi)
- Time zone: UTC+01:00 (CET)
  - Summer (DST): UTC+02:00 (CEST)
- INSEE/Postal code: 16405 /16300
- ^{1} French Land Register data, which excludes lakes, ponds, glaciers > 1 km^{2} (0.386 sq mi or 247 acres) and river estuaries.

Vignolles (French pronunciation: [viɲɔl]) is a commune in the Charente department in southwestern France.

== Population ==
Historical population
Year	Pop.	±% p.a.
1968	264	—
1975	191	−4.52%
1982	187	−0.30%
1990	181	−0.41%
1999	183	+0.12%
2007	182	−0.07%
2012	192	+1.08%
2017	168	−2.64%
2023	170	+0.20%
Source: INSEE

== See also ==
- Communes of the Charente department
