= Angeduc =

- Commune
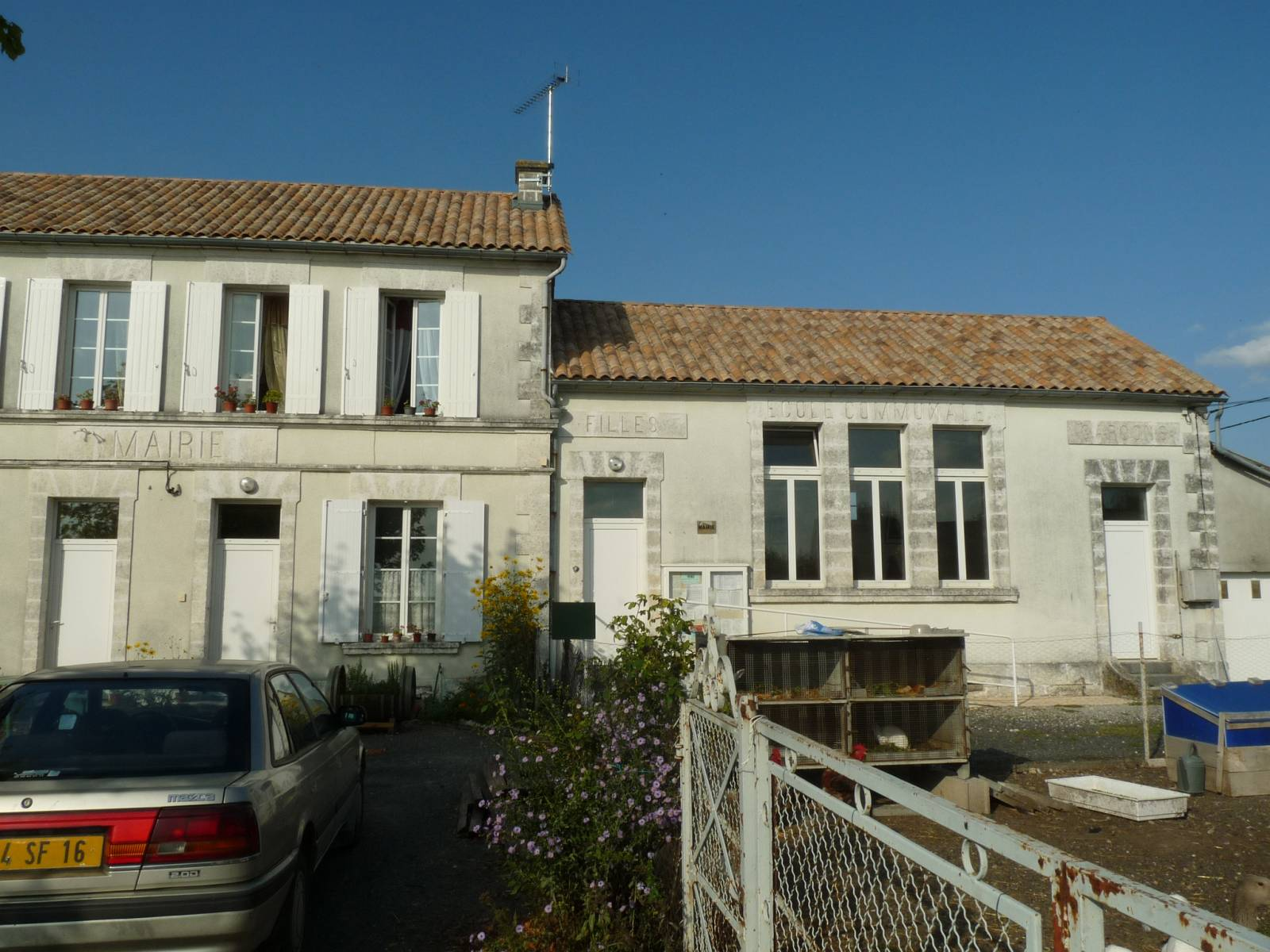
- The town hall in Angeduc
- Location of Angeduc
- Location within France Location within Nouvelle-Aquitaine
- Coordinates: 45°28′32″N 0°02′57″W
- Country: France
- Region: Nouvelle-Aquitaine
- Department: Charente
- Arrondissement: Cognac
- Canton: Charente-Sud
- Intercommunality: 4B - Sud-Charente

Government
  - Mayor (2020–2026): Philippe Moreau
- Area^{1}: 3.59 km^{2} (1.39 sq mi)
- Elevation: 70 m (230 ft)
- Highest elevation: 123 m (404 ft)
- Lowest elevation: 54 m (177 ft)
- Population (2023): 145
  - Density: 40.4/km^{2} (105/sq mi)
- Time zone: UTC+01:00 (CET)
  - Summer (DST): UTC+02:00 (CEST)
- INSEE/Postal code: 16014 /16300
- ^{1} French Land Register data, which excludes lakes, ponds, glaciers > 1 km^{2} (0.386 sq mi or 247 acres) and river estuaries.

Angeduc (French pronunciation: [ɑ̃ʒdyk]) is a commune in the Charente department in southwestern France.

== Population ==
Historical population
Year	Pop.	±% p.a.
1968	119	—
1975	111	−0.99%
1982	104	−0.93%
1990	105	+0.12%
1999	96	−0.99%
2007	108	+1.48%
2012	138	+5.02%
2017	127	−1.65%
2023	145	+2.23%
Source: INSEE

== See also ==
- Communes of the Charente department
