= Salles-de-Barbezieux =

- Commune
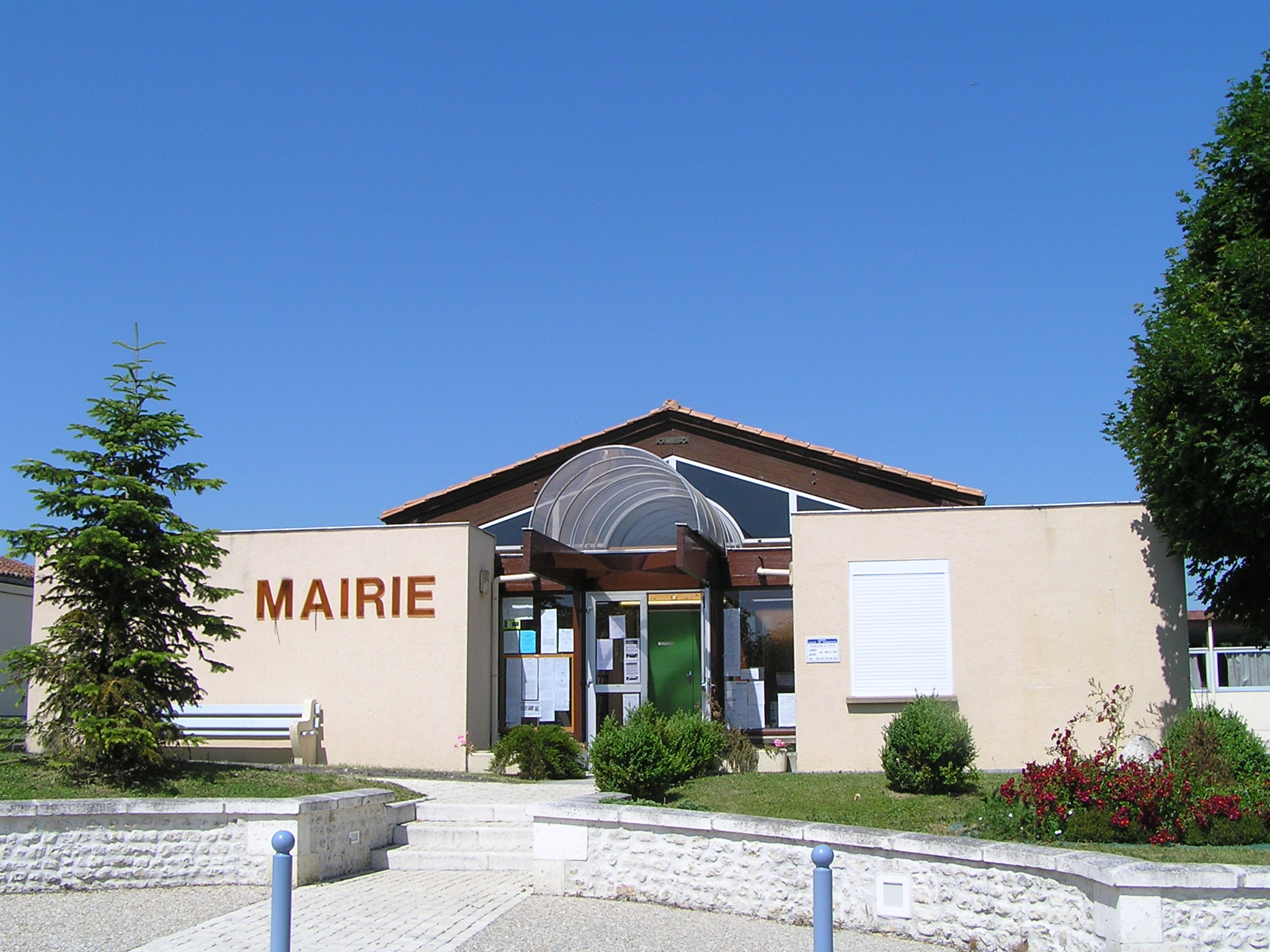
- Town hall
- Location of Salles-de-Barbezieux
- Location within France Location within Nouvelle-Aquitaine
- Coordinates: 45°27′07″N 0°07′46″W
- Country: France
- Region: Nouvelle-Aquitaine
- Department: Charente
- Arrondissement: Cognac
- Canton: Charente-Sud
- Intercommunality: 4B Sud-Charente

Government
  - Mayor (2020–2026): Michel Varenne
- Area^{1}: 9.85 km^{2} (3.80 sq mi)
- Elevation: 85 m (279 ft)
- Highest elevation: 99 m (325 ft)
- Lowest elevation: 48 m (157 ft)
- Population (2023): 407
  - Density: 41.3/km^{2} (107/sq mi)
- Time zone: UTC+01:00 (CET)
  - Summer (DST): UTC+02:00 (CEST)
- INSEE/Postal code: 16360 /16300
- ^{1} French Land Register data, which excludes lakes, ponds, glaciers > 1 km^{2} (0.386 sq mi or 247 acres) and river estuaries.

Salles-de-Barbezieux (French pronunciation: [sal də baʁbəzjø], literally Salles of Barbezieux) is a commune in the Charente department in southwestern France.

== Population ==
Historical population
Year	Pop.	±% p.a.
1968	271	—
1975	267	−0.21%
1982	317	+2.48%
1990	406	+3.14%
1999	408	+0.05%
2007	426	+0.54%
2012	448	+1.01%
2017	427	−0.96%
2023	407	−0.80%
Source: INSEE

== See also ==
- Communes of the Charente department
