= Guizengeard =

- Commune
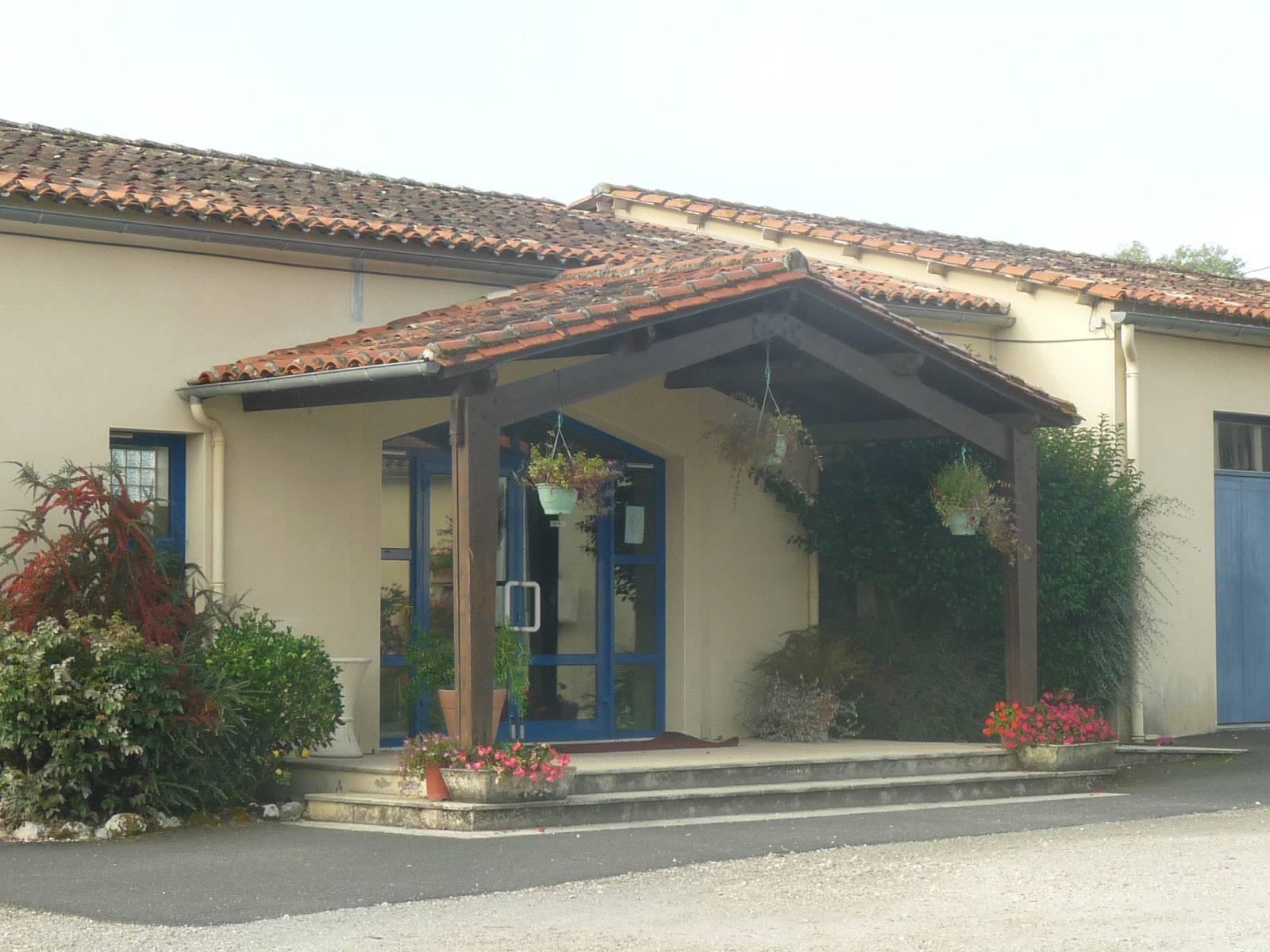
- Community hall
- Location of Guizengeard
- Location within France Location within Nouvelle-Aquitaine
- Coordinates: 45°18′49″N 0°06′09″W
- Country: France
- Region: Nouvelle-Aquitaine
- Department: Charente
- Arrondissement: Cognac
- Canton: Charente-Sud

Government
  - Mayor (2020–2026): Aurélien Gadrat
- Area^{1}: 14.76 km^{2} (5.70 sq mi)
- Elevation: 70 m (230 ft)
- Highest elevation: 157 m (515 ft)
- Lowest elevation: 64 m (210 ft)
- Population (2023): 166
  - Density: 11.2/km^{2} (29.1/sq mi)
- Time zone: UTC+01:00 (CET)
  - Summer (DST): UTC+02:00 (CEST)
- INSEE/Postal code: 16161 /16480
- ^{1} French Land Register data, which excludes lakes, ponds, glaciers > 1 km^{2} (0.386 sq mi or 247 acres) and river estuaries.

Guizengeard (French pronunciation: [ɡizɑ̃ʒaʁ]) is a commune in the Charente department in southwestern France.

== Population ==
Historical population
Year	Pop.	±% p.a.
1968	235	—
1975	213	−1.39%
1982	202	−0.75%
1990	168	−2.28%
1999	155	−0.89%
2007	167	+0.94%
2012	153	−1.74%
2017	170	+2.13%
2023	166	−0.40%
Source: INSEE

== See also ==
- Communes of the Charente department
