= Touvérac =

- Commune
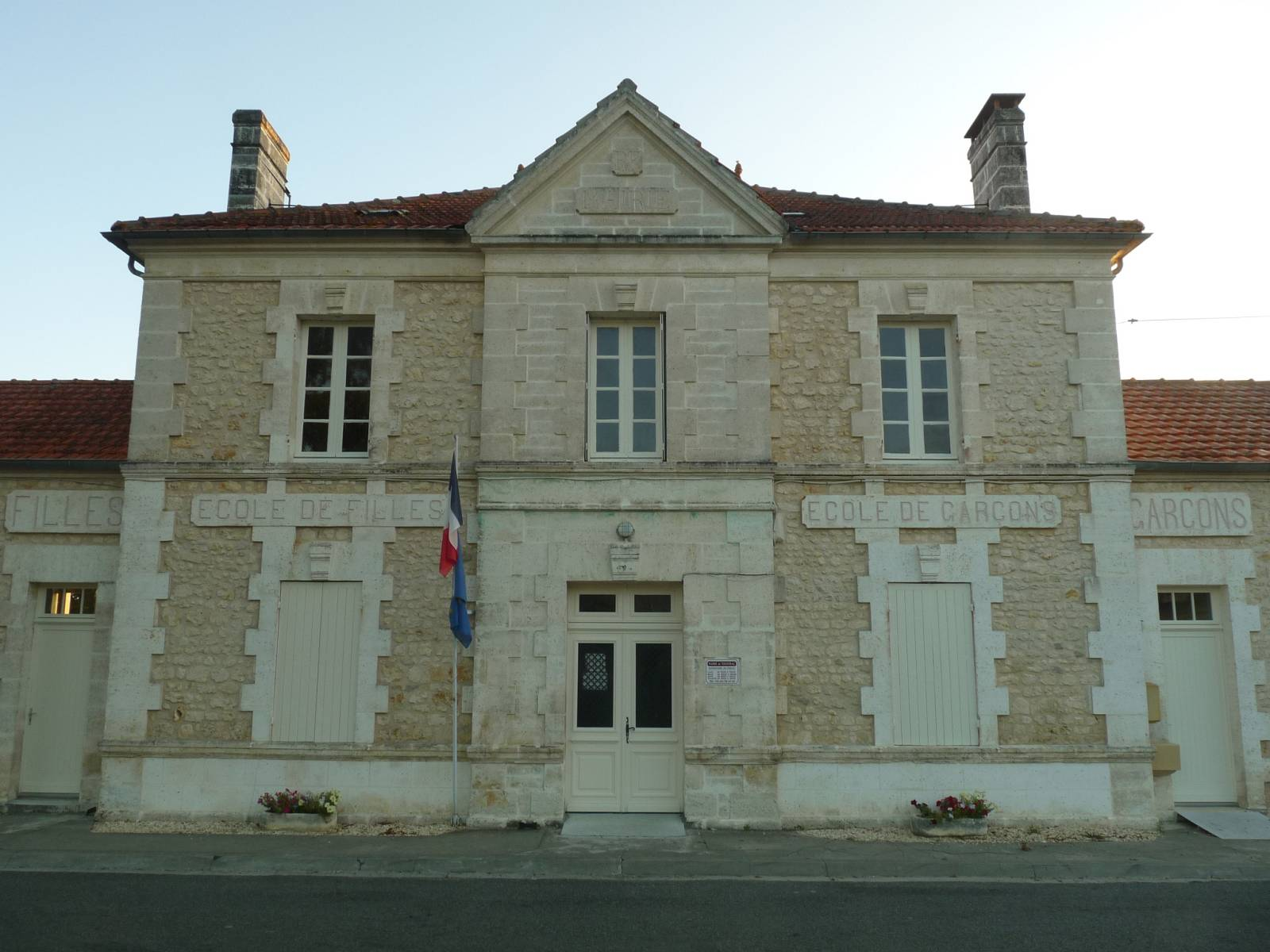
- Town hall
- Location of Touvérac
- Location within France Location within Nouvelle-Aquitaine
- Coordinates: 45°23′03″N 0°13′07″W
- Country: France
- Region: Nouvelle-Aquitaine
- Department: Charente
- Arrondissement: Cognac
- Canton: Charente-Sud

Government
  - Mayor (2020–2026): Jacky Hugues
- Area^{1}: 18.19 km^{2} (7.02 sq mi)
- Elevation: 105 m (344 ft)
- Highest elevation: 156 m (512 ft)
- Lowest elevation: 68 m (223 ft)
- Population (2023): 583
  - Density: 32.1/km^{2} (83.0/sq mi)
- Time zone: UTC+01:00 (CET)
  - Summer (DST): UTC+02:00 (CEST)
- INSEE/Postal code: 16384 /16360
- ^{1} French Land Register data, which excludes lakes, ponds, glaciers > 1 km^{2} (0.386 sq mi or 247 acres) and river estuaries.

Touvérac (French pronunciation: [tuveʁak]) is a commune in the Charente department in southwestern France.

== Population ==
Historical population
Year	Pop.	±% p.a.
1968	722	—
1975	668	−1.10%
1982	765	+1.96%
1990	643	−2.15%
1999	577	−1.20%
2007	726	+2.91%
2012	717	−0.25%
2017	626	−2.68%
2023	583	−1.18%
Source: INSEE

== See also ==
- Communes of the Charente department
