= Reignac, Charente =

Reignac
- Commune
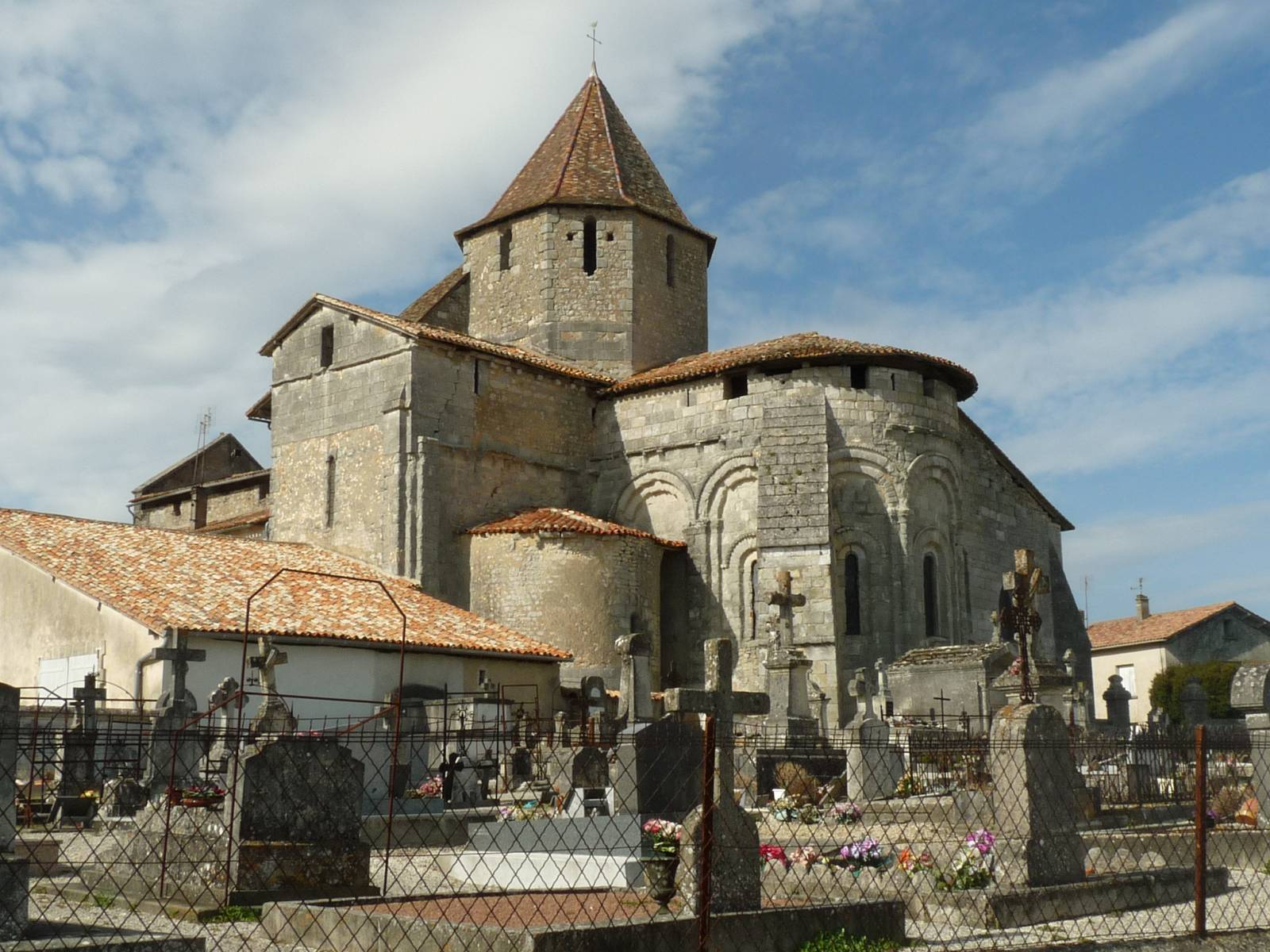
- The church in Reignac

- Coat of arms
- Location of Reignac
- Location within France Location within Nouvelle-Aquitaine
- Coordinates: 45°25′24″N 0°10′55″W
- Country: France
- Region: Nouvelle-Aquitaine
- Department: Charente
- Arrondissement: Cognac
- Canton: Charente-Sud

Government
  - Mayor (2020–2026): Daniel Sauvaitre
- Area^{1}: 22.14 km^{2} (8.55 sq mi)
- Elevation: 108 m (354 ft)
- Highest elevation: 140 m (460 ft)
- Lowest elevation: 66 m (217 ft)
- Population (2023): 712
  - Density: 32.2/km^{2} (83.3/sq mi)
- Time zone: UTC+01:00 (CET)
  - Summer (DST): UTC+02:00 (CEST)
- INSEE/Postal code: 16276 /16360
- ^{1} French Land Register data, which excludes lakes, ponds, glaciers > 1 km^{2} (0.386 sq mi or 247 acres) and river estuaries.

Reignac (French pronunciation: [ʁɛɲak]) is a commune in the Charente department in southwestern France.

== Population ==
Historical population
Year	Pop.	±% p.a.
1968	636	—
1975	618	−0.41%
1982	605	−0.30%
1990	606	+0.02%
1999	582	−0.45%
2007	634	+1.08%
2012	665	+0.96%
2017	747	+2.35%
2023	712	−0.80%
Source: INSEE

== See also ==
- Communes of the Charente department
