= Oriolles =

- Commune
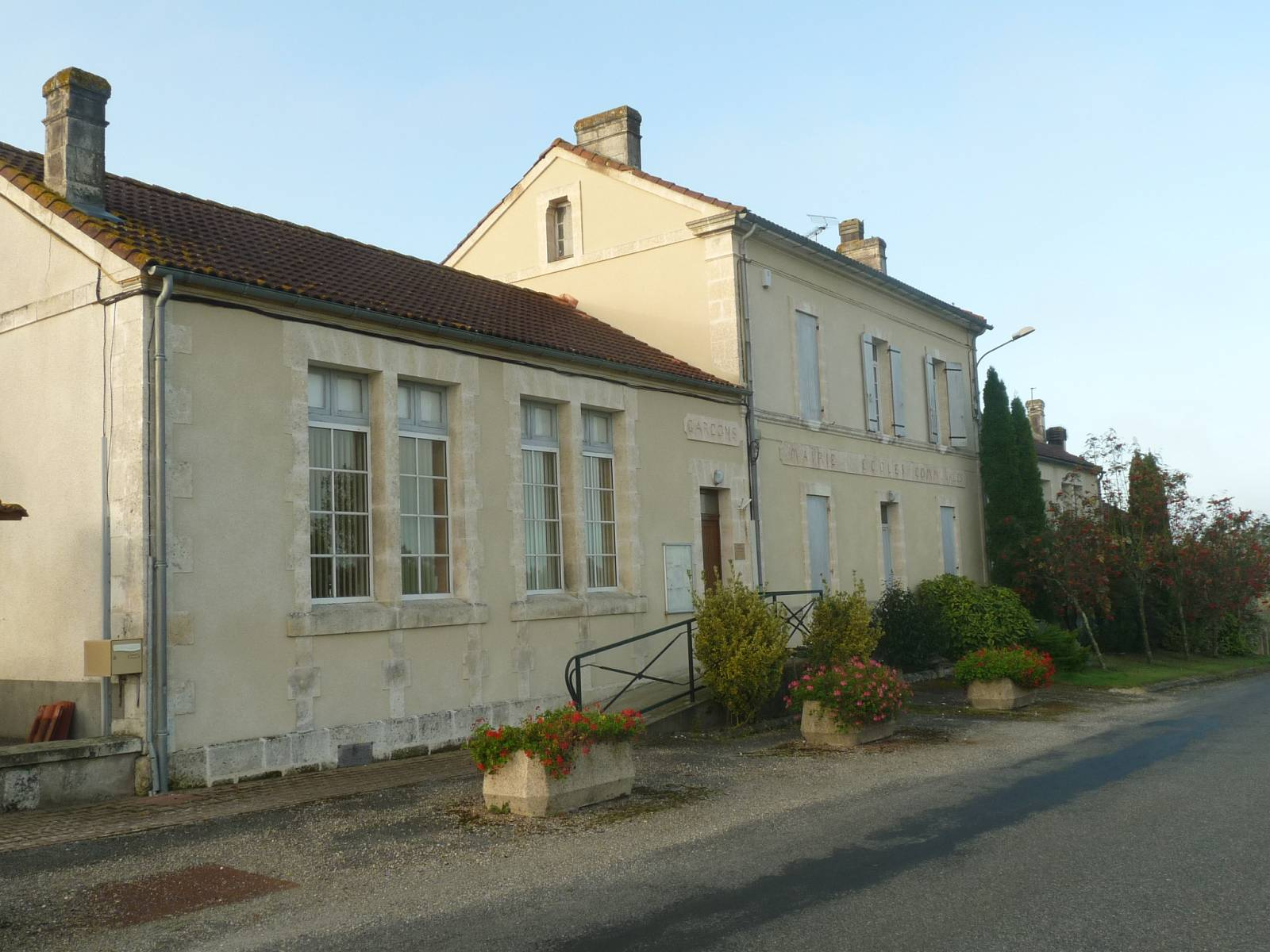
- Town hall
- Location of Oriolles
- Location within France Location within Nouvelle-Aquitaine
- Coordinates: 45°21′42″N 0°07′34″W
- Country: France
- Region: Nouvelle-Aquitaine
- Department: Charente
- Arrondissement: Cognac
- Canton: Charente-Sud
- Intercommunality: 4B Sud-Charente

Government
  - Mayor (2020–2026): Isabelle Lagarde
- Area^{1}: 18.30 km^{2} (7.07 sq mi)
- Elevation: 106 m (348 ft)
- Highest elevation: 162 m (531 ft)
- Lowest elevation: 84 m (276 ft)
- Population (2023): 242
  - Density: 13.2/km^{2} (34.3/sq mi)
- Time zone: UTC+01:00 (CET)
  - Summer (DST): UTC+02:00 (CEST)
- INSEE/Postal code: 16251 /16480
- ^{1} French Land Register data, which excludes lakes, ponds, glaciers > 1 km^{2} (0.386 sq mi or 247 acres) and river estuaries.

Oriolles (French pronunciation: [ɔʁjɔl]) is a commune in the Charente department in southwestern France.

== Population ==
Historical population
Year	Pop.	±% p.a.
1968	264	—
1975	218	−2.70%
1982	222	+0.26%
1990	223	+0.06%
1999	218	−0.25%
2007	241	+1.26%
2012	283	+3.27%
2017	255	−2.06%
2023	242	−0.87%
Source: INSEE

== See also ==
- Communes of the Charente department
