= Saint-Vallier, Charente =

Saint-Vallier
- Commune
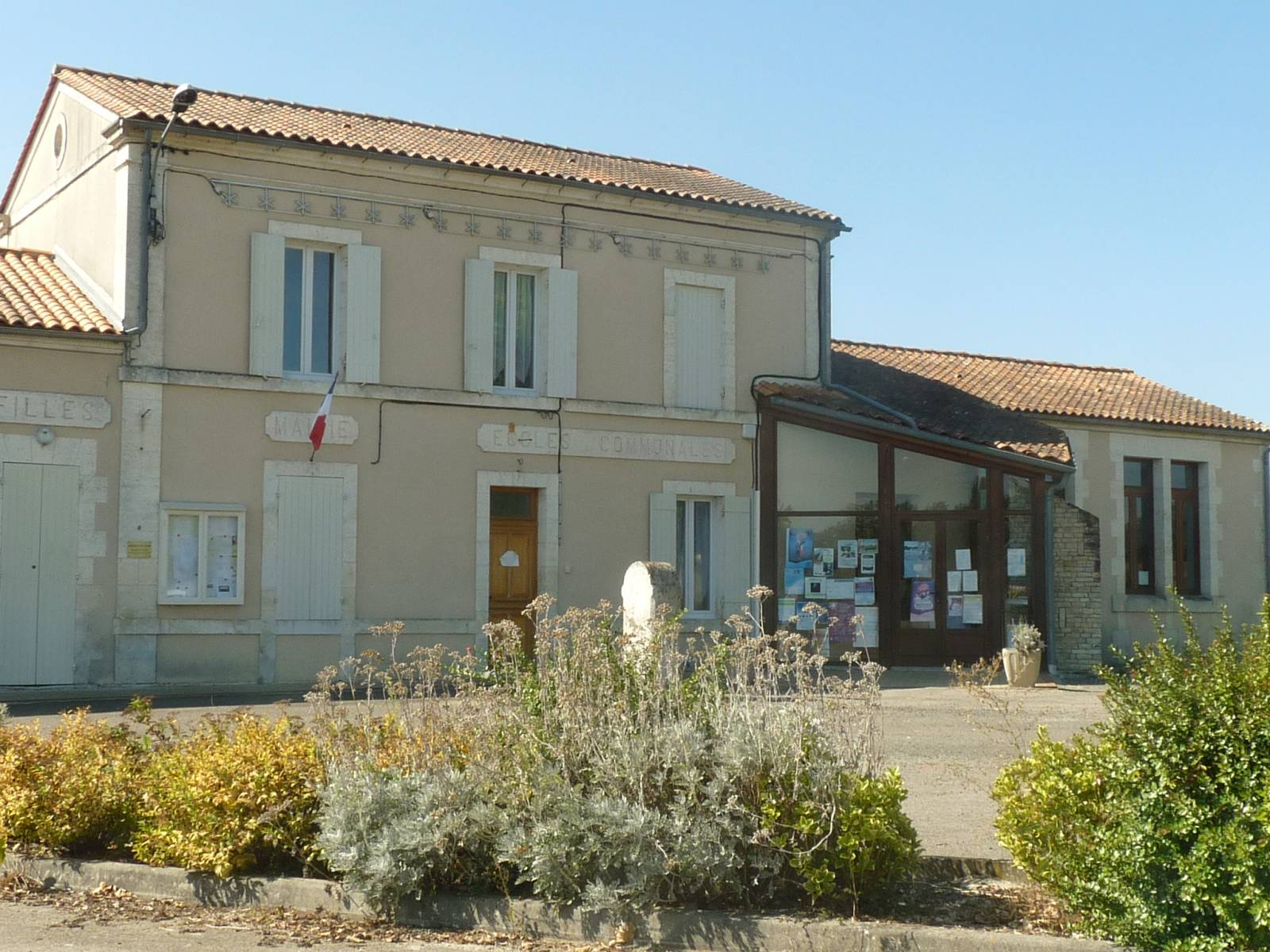
- Town hall
- Location of Saint-Vallier
- Location within France Location within Nouvelle-Aquitaine
- Coordinates: 45°17′42″N 0°03′37″W
- Country: France
- Region: Nouvelle-Aquitaine
- Department: Charente
- Arrondissement: Cognac
- Canton: Charente-Sud

Government
  - Mayor (2020–2026): Patrick Favreau
- Area^{1}: 18.21 km^{2} (7.03 sq mi)
- Elevation: 120 m (390 ft)
- Highest elevation: 158 m (518 ft)
- Lowest elevation: 53 m (174 ft)
- Population (2023): 139
  - Density: 7.63/km^{2} (19.8/sq mi)
- Time zone: UTC+01:00 (CET)
  - Summer (DST): UTC+02:00 (CEST)
- INSEE/Postal code: 16357 /16480
- ^{1} French Land Register data, which excludes lakes, ponds, glaciers > 1 km^{2} (0.386 sq mi or 247 acres) and river estuaries.

Saint-Vallier (French pronunciation: [sɛ̃ valje]) is a commune in the Charente department in southwestern France.

== Population ==
Historical population
| Year | Pop. | ±% p.a. |
|---|---|---|
| 1968 | 240 | — |
| 1975 | 212 | −1.76% |
| 1982 | 198 | −0.97% |
| 1990 | 182 | −1.05% |
| 1999 | 167 | −0.95% |
| 2007 | 152 | −1.17% |
| 2012 | 143 | −1.21% |
| 2017 | 136 | −1.00% |
| 2023 | 139 | +0.36% |
Source: INSEE

== See also ==
- Communes of the Charente department
