= Ladiville =

- Commune
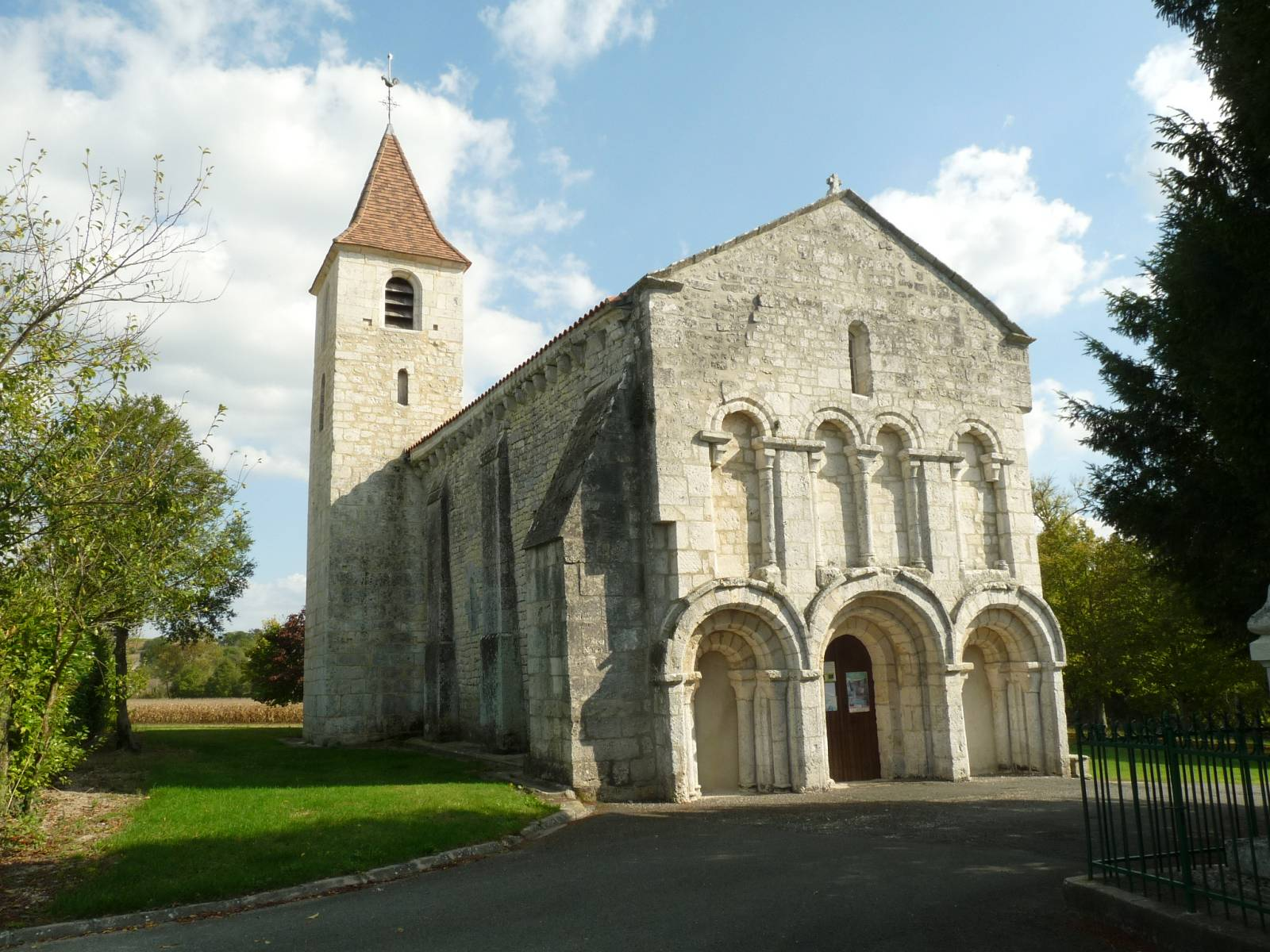
- The church in Ladiville
- Location of Ladiville
- Location within France Location within Nouvelle-Aquitaine
- Coordinates: 45°30′57″N 0°03′54″W
- Country: France
- Region: Nouvelle-Aquitaine
- Department: Charente
- Arrondissement: Cognac
- Canton: Charente-Sud

Government
  - Mayor (2020–2026): Jacques Chabot
- Area^{1}: 7.19 km^{2} (2.78 sq mi)
- Elevation: 49 m (161 ft)
- Highest elevation: 123 m (404 ft)
- Lowest elevation: 47 m (154 ft)
- Population (2023): 135
  - Density: 18.8/km^{2} (48.6/sq mi)
- Time zone: UTC+01:00 (CET)
  - Summer (DST): UTC+02:00 (CEST)
- INSEE/Postal code: 16177 /16120
- ^{1} French Land Register data, which excludes lakes, ponds, glaciers > 1 km^{2} (0.386 sq mi or 247 acres) and river estuaries.

Ladiville (French pronunciation: [ladivil]) is a commune in the Charente department in southwestern France.

== Population ==
Historical population
Year	Pop.	±% p.a.
1968	178	—
1975	155	−1.96%
1982	136	−1.85%
1990	128	−0.75%
1999	139	+0.92%
2007	128	−1.03%
2012	114	−2.29%
2017	120	+1.03%
2023	135	+1.98%
Source: INSEE

== See also ==
- Communes of the Charente department
