= Saint-Bonnet =

- Commune
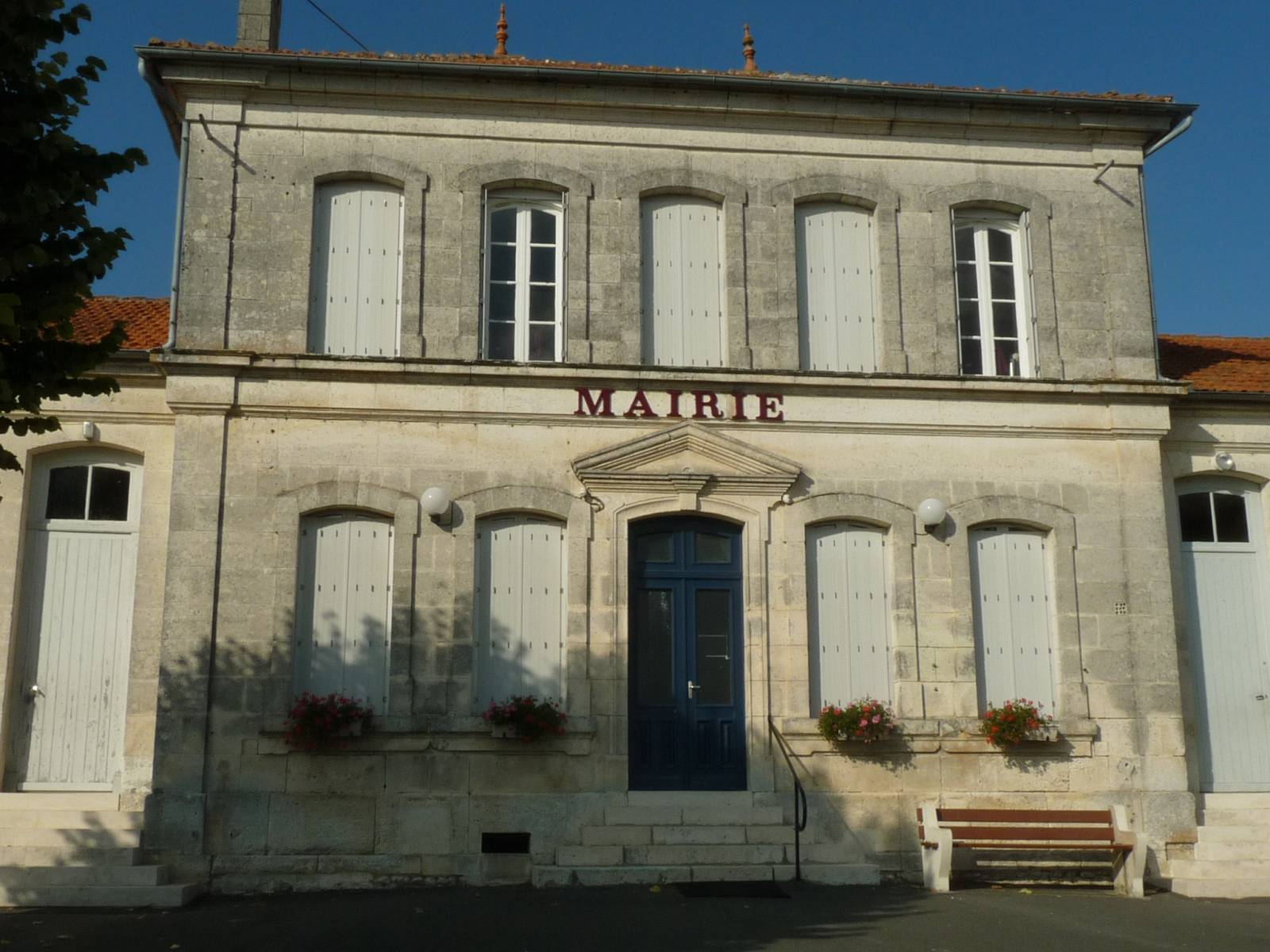
- The town hall in Saint-Bonnet
- Location of Saint-Bonnet
- Location within France Location within Nouvelle-Aquitaine
- Coordinates: 45°28′43″N 0°05′48″W
- Country: France
- Region: Nouvelle-Aquitaine
- Department: Charente
- Arrondissement: Cognac
- Canton: Charente-Sud
- Intercommunality: 4B Sud-Charente

Government
  - Mayor (2020–2026): Sandrine Pourtau
- Area^{1}: 17.77 km^{2} (6.86 sq mi)
- Elevation: 80 m (260 ft)
- Highest elevation: 109 m (358 ft)
- Lowest elevation: 45 m (148 ft)
- Population (2023): 409
  - Density: 23.0/km^{2} (59.6/sq mi)
- Time zone: UTC+01:00 (CET)
  - Summer (DST): UTC+02:00 (CEST)
- INSEE/Postal code: 16303 /16300
- ^{1} French Land Register data, which excludes lakes, ponds, glaciers > 1 km^{2} (0.386 sq mi or 247 acres) and river estuaries.

Saint-Bonnet (French pronunciation: [sɛ̃ bɔnɛ]) is a commune in the Charente department in southwestern France.

== Population ==
Historical population
Year	Pop.	±% p.a.
1968	470	—
1975	415	−1.76%
1982	369	−1.66%
1990	374	+0.17%
1999	337	−1.15%
2007	383	+1.61%
2012	362	−1.12%
2017	407	+2.37%
2023	409	+0.08%
Source: INSEE

== See also ==
- Communes of the Charente department
