= Champagne-Vigny =

- Commune
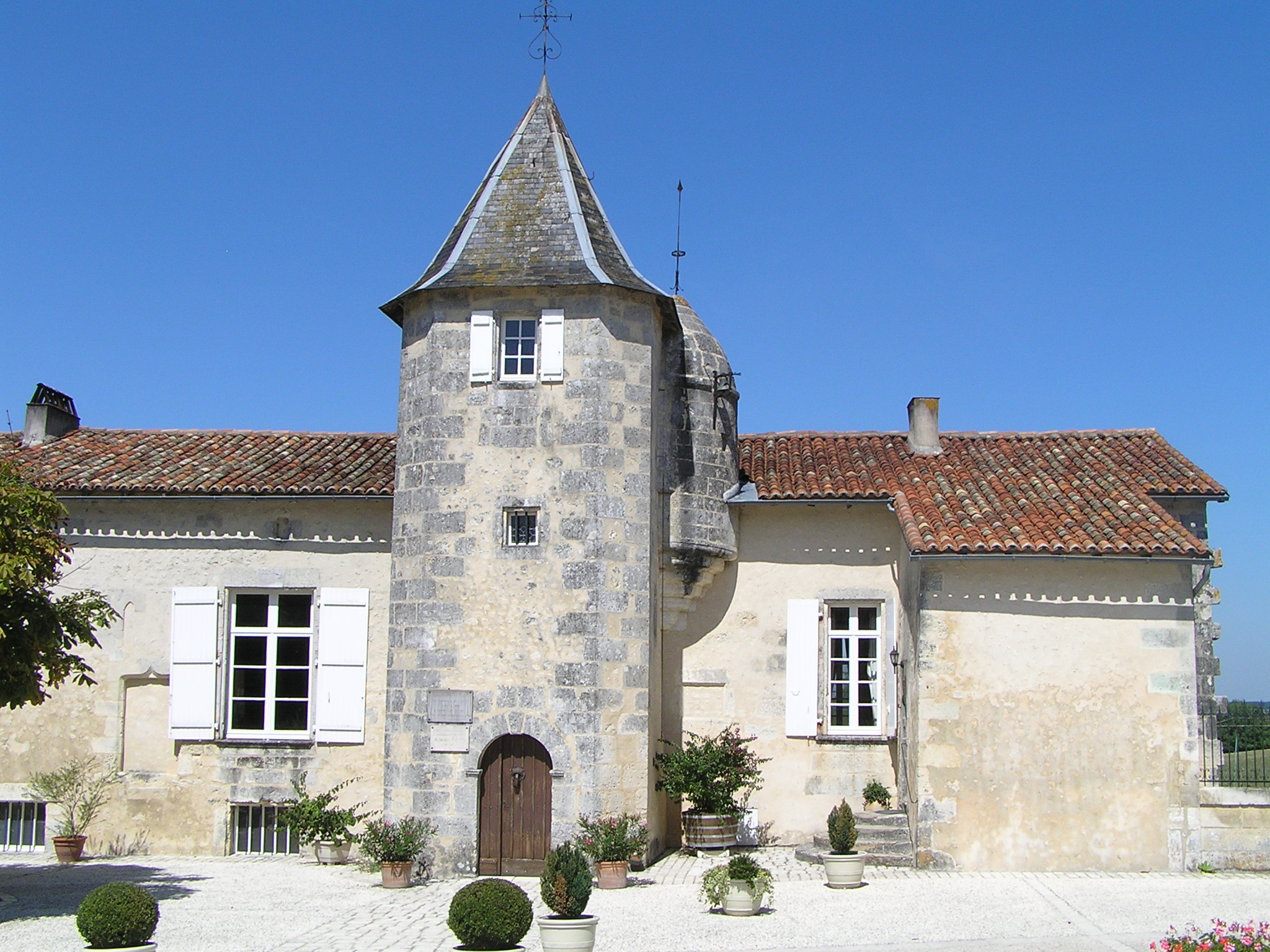
- Alfred Manor in Champagne-Vigny
- Location of Champagne-Vigny
- Location within France Location within Nouvelle-Aquitaine
- Coordinates: 45°30′30″N 0°02′16″E
- Country: France
- Region: Nouvelle-Aquitaine
- Department: Charente
- Arrondissement: Cognac
- Canton: Charente-Sud

Government
  - Mayor (2023–2026): Patrice Chappa
- Area^{1}: 8.31 km^{2} (3.21 sq mi)
- Elevation: 103 m (338 ft)
- Highest elevation: 160 m (520 ft)
- Lowest elevation: 78 m (256 ft)
- Population (2023): 234
  - Density: 28.2/km^{2} (72.9/sq mi)
- Time zone: UTC+01:00 (CET)
  - Summer (DST): UTC+02:00 (CEST)
- INSEE/Postal code: 16075 /16250
- ^{1} French Land Register data, which excludes lakes, ponds, glaciers > 1 km^{2} (0.386 sq mi or 247 acres) and river estuaries.

Champagne-Vigny (French pronunciation: [ʃɑ̃paɲ viɲi]) is a commune in the Charente department in southwestern France.

== Population ==
Historical population
Year	Pop.	±% p.a.
1968	197	—
1975	179	−1.36%
1982	199	+1.52%
1990	193	−0.38%
1999	184	−0.53%
2007	200	+1.05%
2012	260	+5.39%
2017	247	−1.02%
2023	234	−0.90%
Source: INSEE

== See also ==
- Communes of the Charente department
