= Sainte-Souline =

- Commune
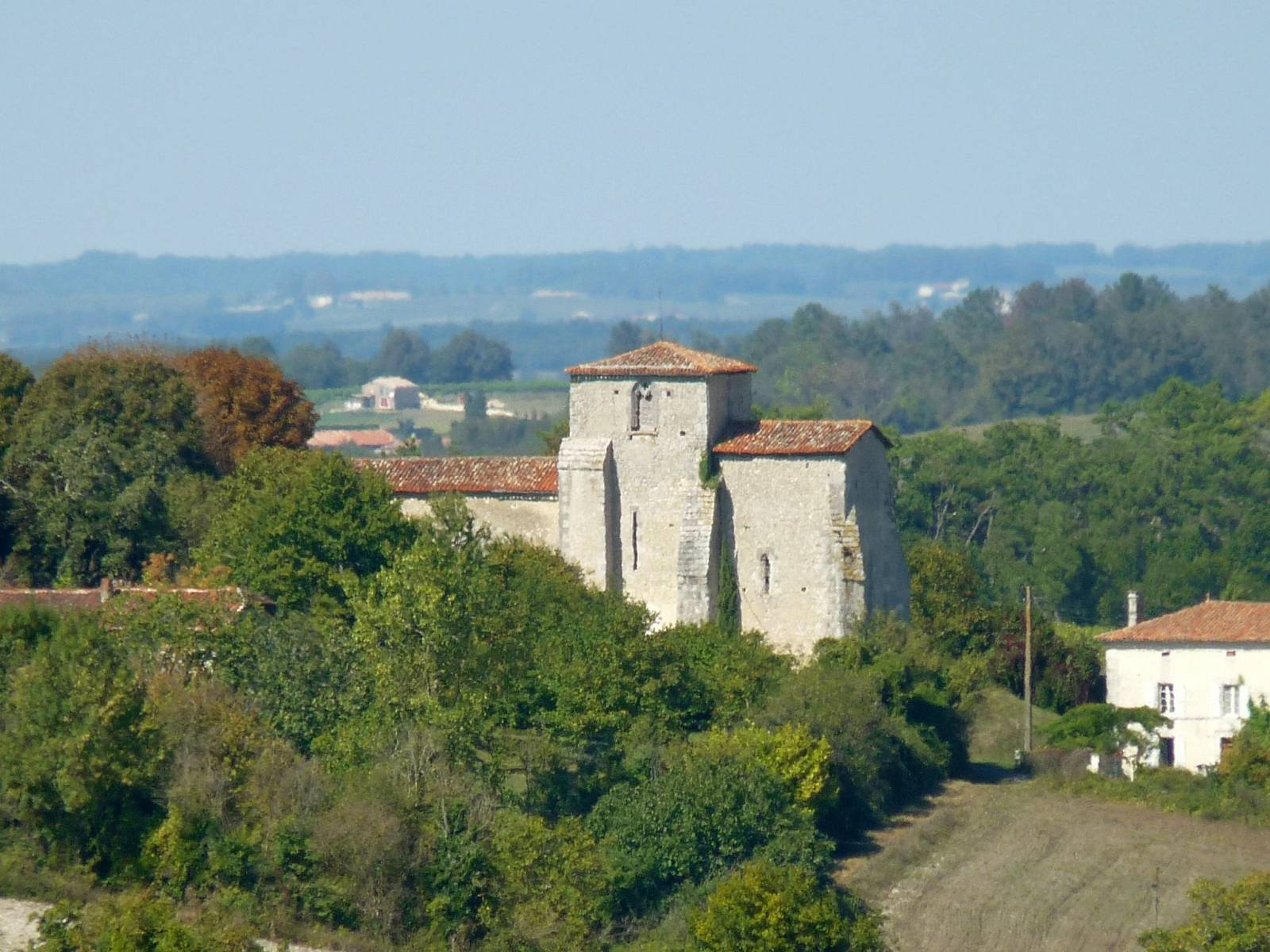
- The church in Sainte-Souline
- Location of Sainte-Souline
- Location within France Location within Nouvelle-Aquitaine
- Coordinates: 45°22′49″N 0°00′55″W
- Country: France
- Region: Nouvelle-Aquitaine
- Department: Charente
- Arrondissement: Cognac
- Canton: Charente-Sud

Government
  - Mayor (2021–2026): Marie-Josèphe Mahias
- Area^{1}: 7.32 km^{2} (2.83 sq mi)
- Elevation: 172 m (564 ft)
- Highest elevation: 186 m (610 ft)
- Lowest elevation: 98 m (322 ft)
- Population (2023): 112
  - Density: 15.3/km^{2} (39.6/sq mi)
- Time zone: UTC+01:00 (CET)
  - Summer (DST): UTC+02:00 (CEST)
- INSEE/Postal code: 16354 /16480
- ^{1} French Land Register data, which excludes lakes, ponds, glaciers > 1 km^{2} (0.386 sq mi or 247 acres) and river estuaries.

Sainte-Souline (French pronunciation: [sɛ̃t sulin]) is a commune in the French department of Charente, southwestern France.

== Population ==
Historical population
Year	Pop.	±% p.a.
1968	159	—
1975	112	−4.88%
1982	121	+1.11%
1990	104	−1.87%
1999	113	+0.93%
2007	124	+1.17%
2012	111	−2.19%
2017	118	+1.23%
2023	112	−0.87%
Source: INSEE

== See also ==
- Communes of the Charente department
