= Barret, Charente =

Barret
- Commune
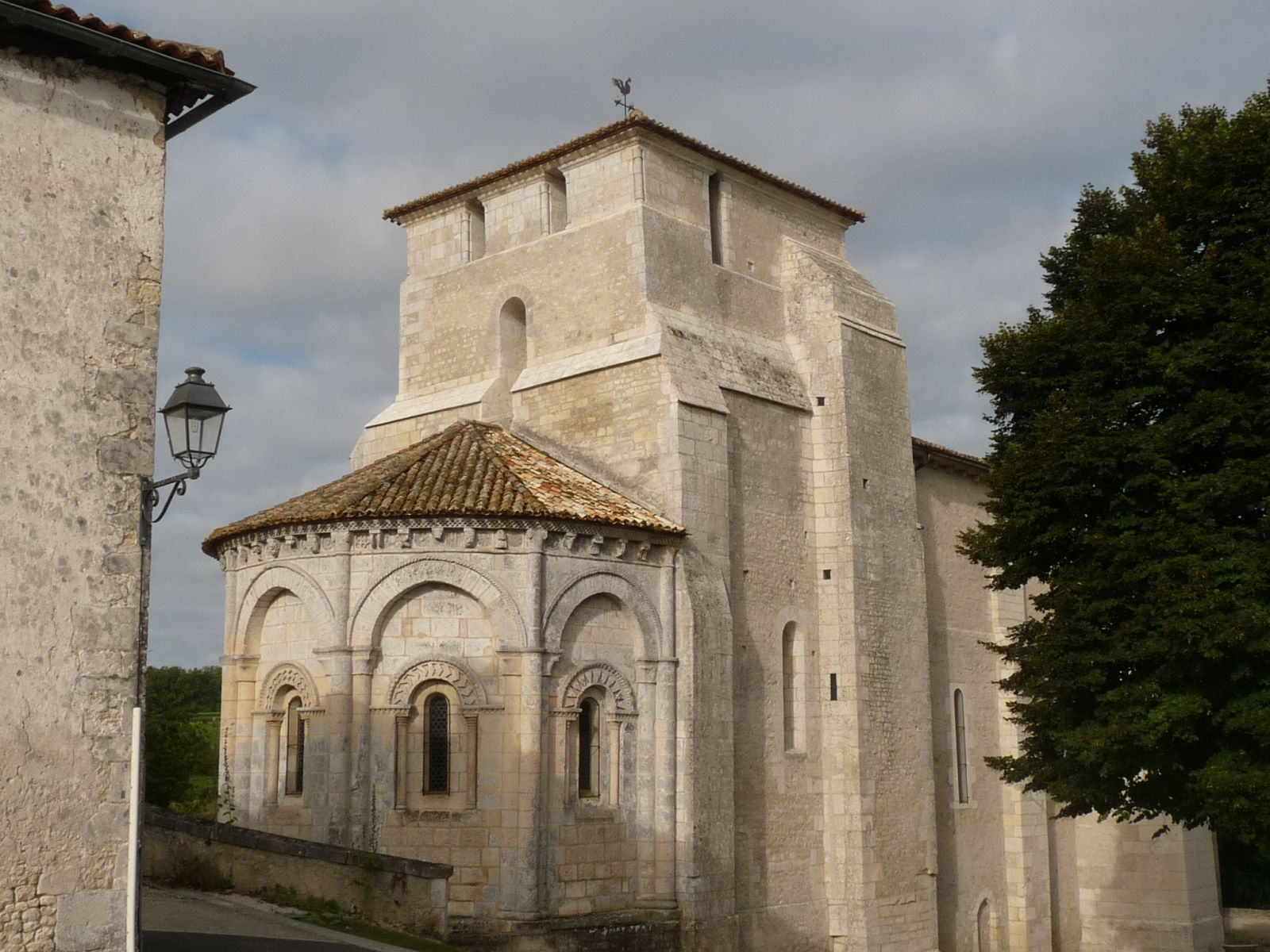
- The church in Barret
- Location of Barret
- Location within France Location within Nouvelle-Aquitaine
- Coordinates: 45°29′24″N 0°12′14″W
- Country: France
- Region: Nouvelle-Aquitaine
- Department: Charente
- Arrondissement: Cognac
- Canton: Charente-Sud
- Intercommunality: 4B - Sud-Charente

Government
  - Mayor (2020–2026): Dominique Chatellier
- Area^{1}: 22.37 km^{2} (8.64 sq mi)
- Elevation: 67 m (220 ft)
- Highest elevation: 127 m (417 ft)
- Lowest elevation: 34 m (112 ft)
- Population (2023): 1,080
  - Density: 48.3/km^{2} (125/sq mi)
- Time zone: UTC+01:00 (CET)
  - Summer (DST): UTC+02:00 (CEST)
- INSEE/Postal code: 16030 /16300
- ^{1} French Land Register data, which excludes lakes, ponds, glaciers > 1 km^{2} (0.386 sq mi or 247 acres) and river estuaries.

Barret (French pronunciation: [baʁɛ]) is a commune in the Charente department in southwestern France.

== Population ==
Historical population
| Year | Pop. | ±% p.a. |
|---|---|---|
| 1968 | 750 | — |
| 1975 | 810 | +1.11% |
| 1982 | 862 | +0.89% |
| 1990 | 951 | +1.24% |
| 1999 | 866 | −1.03% |
| 2007 | 897 | +0.44% |
| 2012 | 960 | +1.37% |
| 2017 | 1,027 | +1.36% |
| 2023 | 1,080 | +0.84% |
Source: INSEE

== See also ==
- Communes of the Charente department
