= Condéon =

- Commune
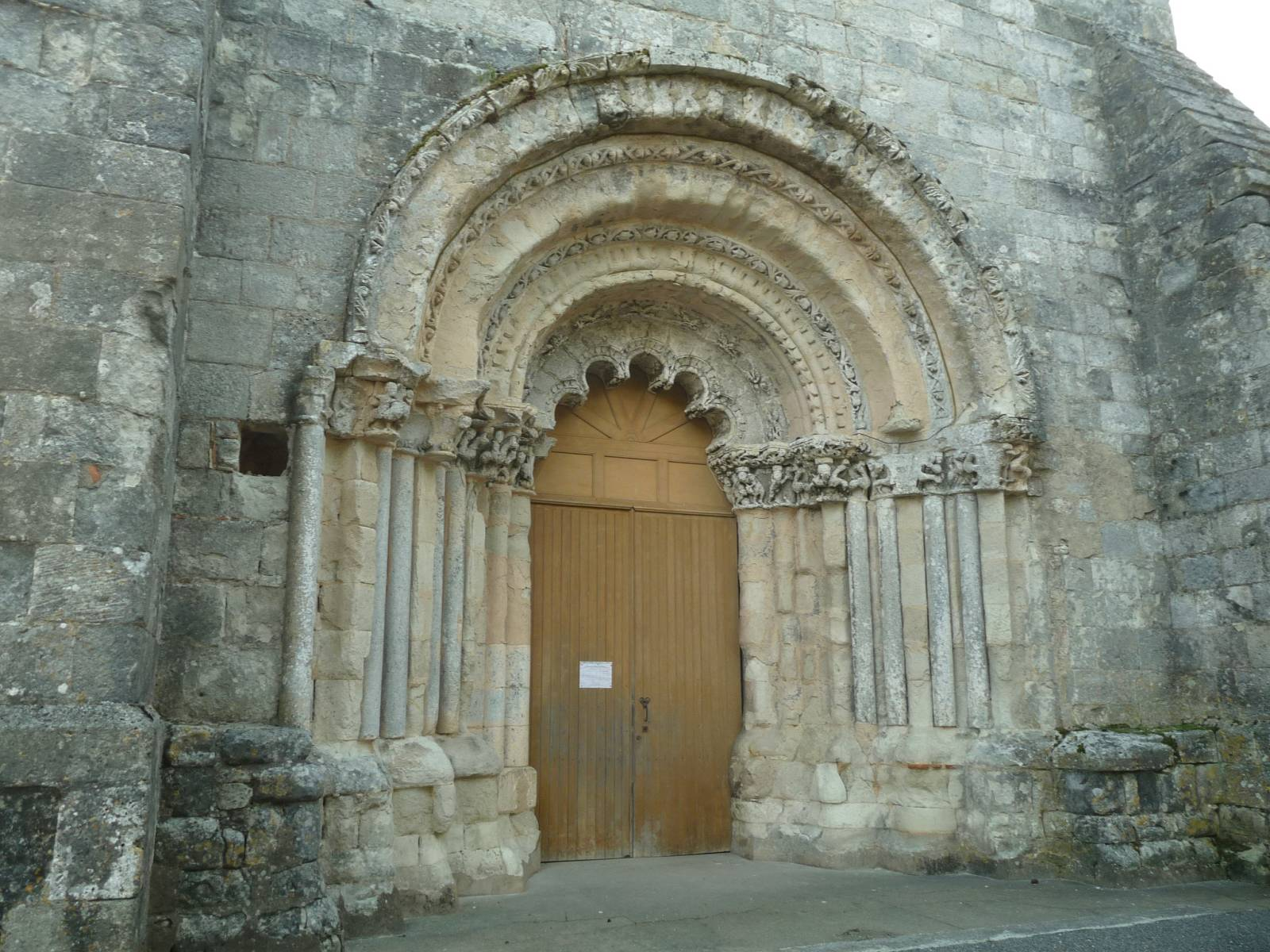
- Door of the church
- Location of Condéon
- Location within France Location within Nouvelle-Aquitaine
- Coordinates: 45°24′29″N 0°08′08″W
- Country: France
- Region: Nouvelle-Aquitaine
- Department: Charente
- Arrondissement: Cognac
- Canton: Charente-Sud
- Intercommunality: 4B Sud-Charente

Government
  - Mayor (2020–2026): Véronique Fouassier
- Area^{1}: 31.40 km^{2} (12.12 sq mi)
- Elevation: 72 m (236 ft)
- Highest elevation: 162 m (531 ft)
- Lowest elevation: 63 m (207 ft)
- Population (2023): 606
  - Density: 19.3/km^{2} (50.0/sq mi)
- Time zone: UTC+01:00 (CET)
  - Summer (DST): UTC+02:00 (CEST)
- INSEE/Postal code: 16105 /16360
- ^{1} French Land Register data, which excludes lakes, ponds, glaciers > 1 km^{2} (0.386 sq mi or 247 acres) and river estuaries.

Condéon (French pronunciation: [kɔ̃deɔ̃]) is a commune in the Charente department in southwestern France.

== Population ==
Historical population
Year	Pop.	±% p.a.
1968	603	—
1975	533	−1.75%
1982	518	−0.41%
1990	553	+0.82%
1999	540	−0.26%
2007	553	+0.30%
2012	571	+0.64%
2017	607	+1.23%
2023	606	−0.03%
Source: INSEE

== See also ==
- Communes of the Charente department
