= Passirac =

- Commune
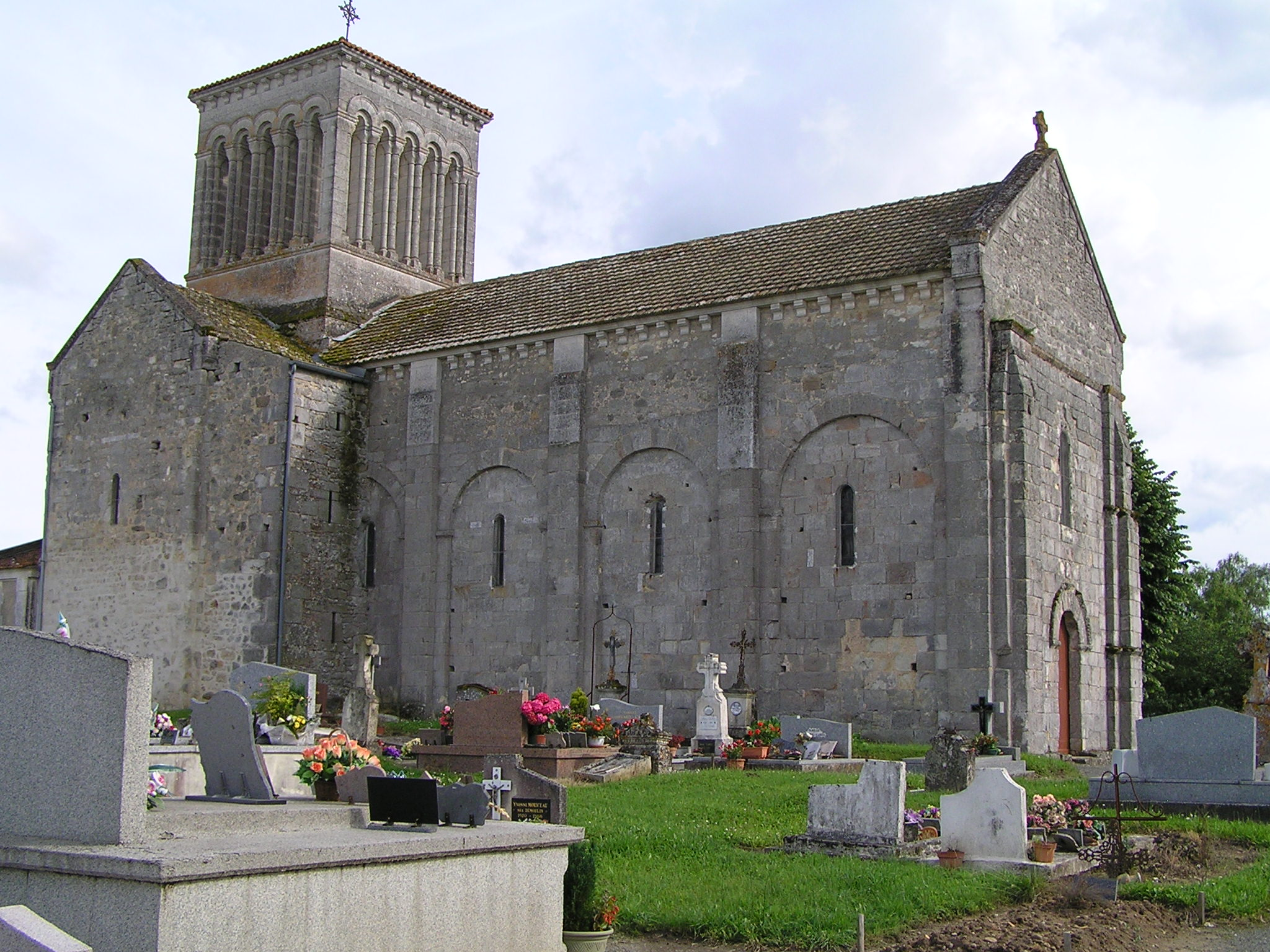
- The church in Passirac

- Coat of arms
- Location of Passirac
- Location within France Location within Nouvelle-Aquitaine
- Coordinates: 45°20′48″N 0°03′46″E
- Country: France
- Region: Nouvelle-Aquitaine
- Department: Charente
- Arrondissement: Cognac
- Canton: Charente-Sud

Government
  - Mayor (2020–2026): Dominique de Castelbajac
- Area^{1}: 14.67 km^{2} (5.66 sq mi)
- Highest elevation: 174 m (571 ft)
- Lowest elevation: 74 m (243 ft)
- Population (2023): 250
  - Density: 17/km^{2} (44/sq mi)
- Time zone: UTC+01:00 (CET)
  - Summer (DST): UTC+02:00 (CEST)
- INSEE/Postal code: 16256 /16480
- ^{1} French Land Register data, which excludes lakes, ponds, glaciers > 1 km^{2} (0.386 sq mi or 247 acres) and river estuaries.

Passirac (French pronunciation: [pasiʁak]) is a commune in the Charente department in southwestern France.

== Population ==
Historical population
Year	Pop.	±% p.a.
1968	341	—
1975	287	−2.43%
1982	242	−2.41%
1990	217	−1.35%
1999	227	+0.50%
2007	255	+1.46%
2012	237	−1.45%
2017	240	+0.25%
2023	250	+0.68%
Source: INSEE

== See also ==
- Communes of the Charente department
