= Saint-Félix, Charente =

Saint-Félix
- Commune
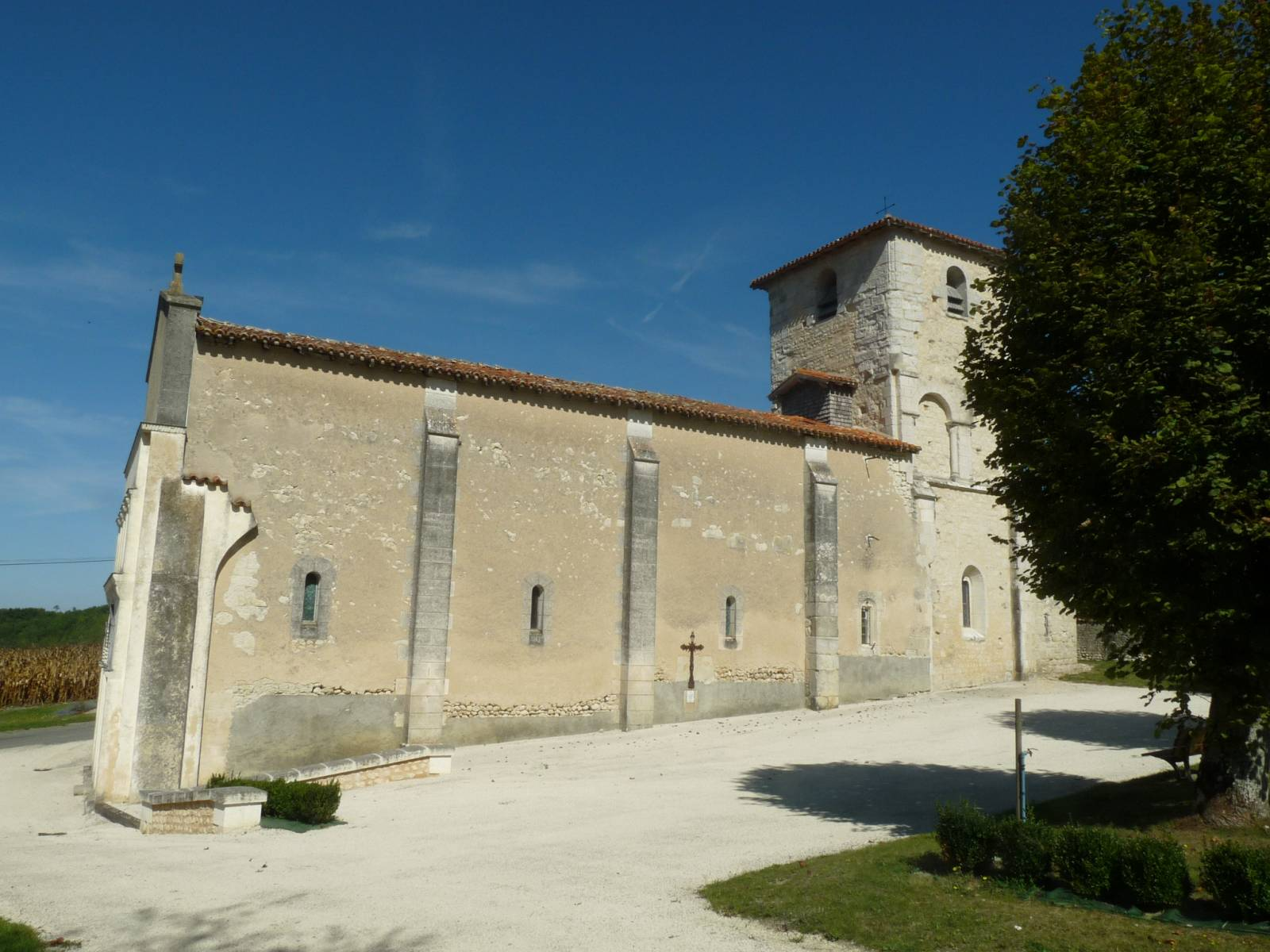
- The church in Saint-Félix
- Location of Saint-Félix
- Location within France Location within Nouvelle-Aquitaine
- Coordinates: 45°22′33″N 0°00′41″E
- Country: France
- Region: Nouvelle-Aquitaine
- Department: Charente
- Arrondissement: Cognac
- Canton: Charente-Sud
- Intercommunality: 4B Sud-Charente

Government
  - Mayor (2020–2026): Marie-Claire Aubrit
- Area^{1}: 8.08 km^{2} (3.12 sq mi)
- Elevation: 150 m (490 ft)
- Highest elevation: 175 m (574 ft)
- Lowest elevation: 84 m (276 ft)
- Population (2023): 102
  - Density: 12.6/km^{2} (32.7/sq mi)
- Time zone: UTC+01:00 (CET)
  - Summer (DST): UTC+02:00 (CEST)
- INSEE/Postal code: 16315 /16480
- ^{1} French Land Register data, which excludes lakes, ponds, glaciers > 1 km^{2} (0.386 sq mi or 247 acres) and river estuaries.

Saint-Félix is a commune in the Charente department in southwestern France.

== Population ==
Historical population
Year	Pop.	±% p.a.
1968	205	—
1975	175	−2.23%
1982	136	−3.54%
1990	118	−1.76%
1999	119	+0.09%
2007	113	−0.64%
2012	119	+1.04%
2017	111	−1.38%
2023	102	−1.40%
Source: INSEE

== See also ==
- Communes of the Charente department
