= Saint-Médard, Charente =

Saint-Médard
- Commune
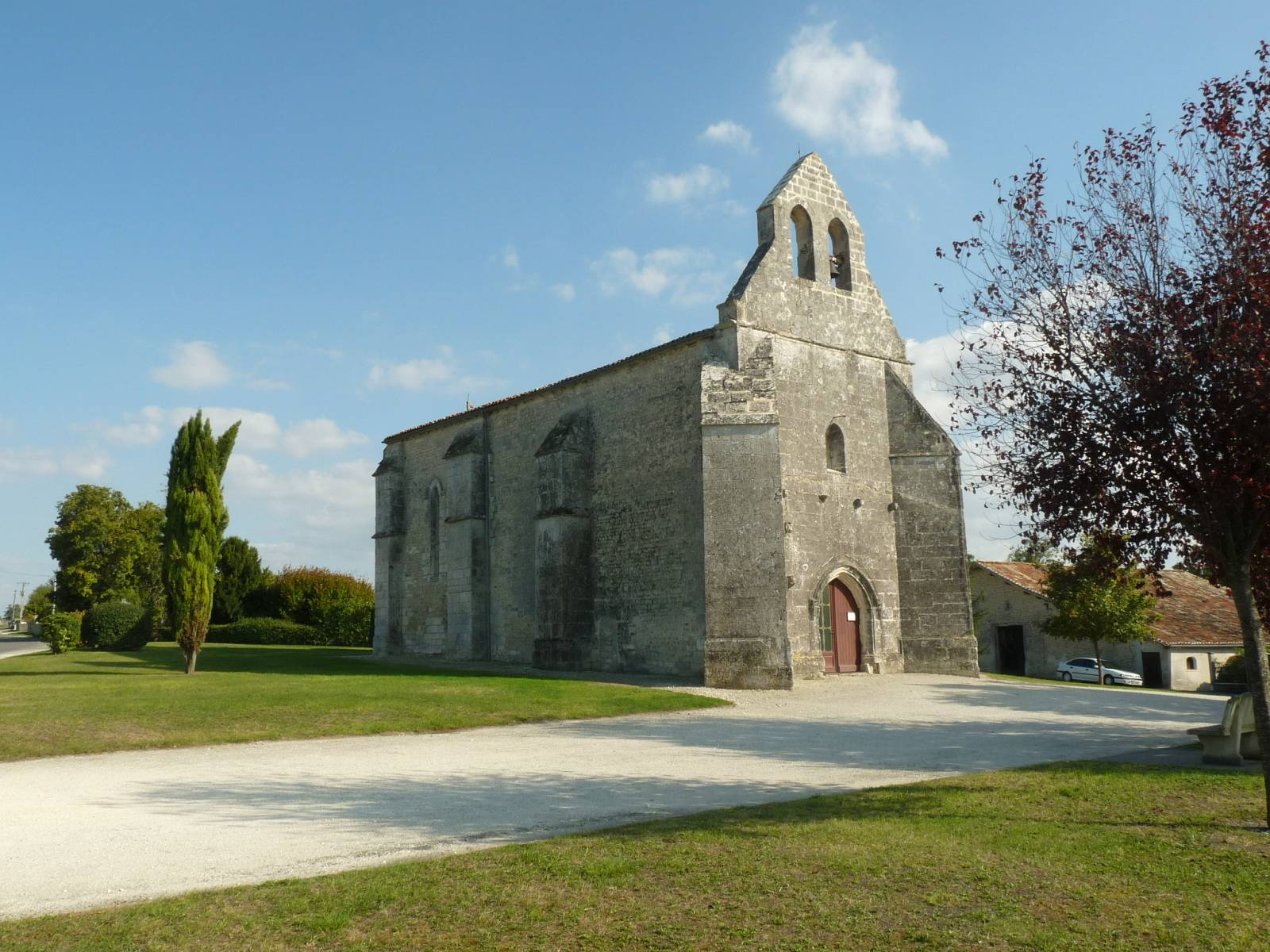
- The church in Saint-Médard
- Location of Saint-Médard
- Location within France Location within Nouvelle-Aquitaine
- Coordinates: 45°30′42″N 0°08′10″W
- Country: France
- Region: Nouvelle-Aquitaine
- Department: Charente
- Arrondissement: Cognac
- Canton: Charente-Sud
- Intercommunality: 4B Sud-Charente

Government
  - Mayor (2020–2026): Françoise Monnereau
- Area^{1}: 8.24 km^{2} (3.18 sq mi)
- Elevation: 55 m (180 ft)
- Highest elevation: 83 m (272 ft)
- Lowest elevation: 36 m (118 ft)
- Population (2023): 303
  - Density: 36.8/km^{2} (95.2/sq mi)
- Time zone: UTC+01:00 (CET)
  - Summer (DST): UTC+02:00 (CEST)
- INSEE/Postal code: 16338 /16300
- ^{1} French Land Register data, which excludes lakes, ponds, glaciers > 1 km^{2} (0.386 sq mi or 247 acres) and river estuaries.

Saint-Médard (French pronunciation: [sɛ̃ medaʁ]) is a commune in the Charente department in southwestern France.

== Population ==
Historical population
| Year | Pop. | ±% p.a. |
|---|---|---|
| 1968 | 264 | — |
| 1975 | 237 | −1.53% |
| 1982 | 257 | +1.16% |
| 1990 | 257 | +0.00% |
| 1999 | 271 | +0.59% |
| 2007 | 243 | −1.35% |
| 2012 | 312 | +5.13% |
| 2017 | 326 | +0.88% |
| 2023 | 303 | −1.21% |
Source: INSEE

== See also ==
- Communes of the Charente department
