= Challignac =

- Commune
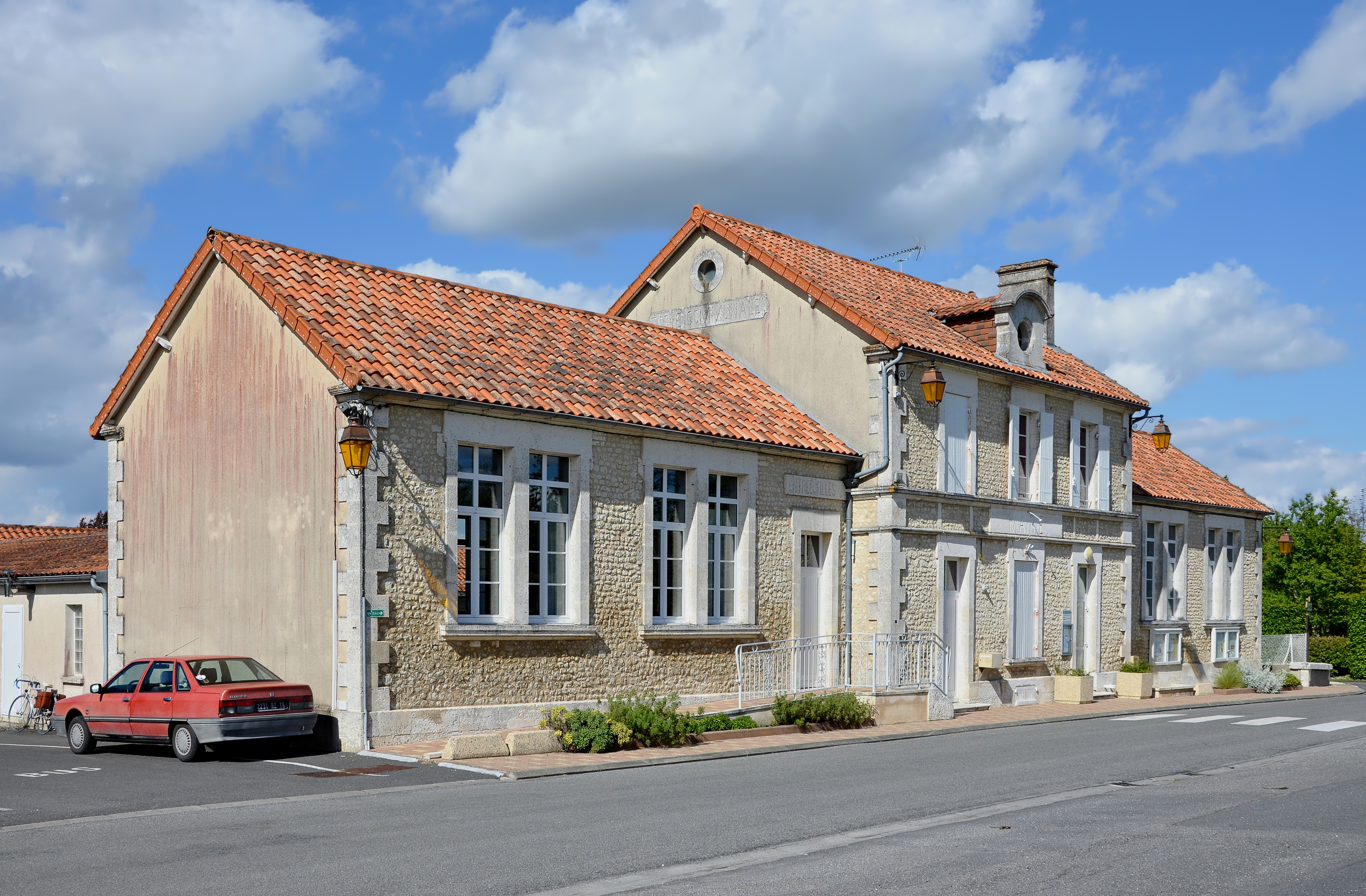
- The town hall and school in Challignac
- Location of Challignac
- Location within France Location within Nouvelle-Aquitaine
- Coordinates: 45°24′57″N 0°04′51″W
- Country: France
- Region: Nouvelle-Aquitaine
- Department: Charente
- Arrondissement: Cognac
- Canton: Charente-Sud

Government
  - Mayor (2020–2026): Christophe Tutard
- Area^{1}: 13.21 km^{2} (5.10 sq mi)
- Elevation: 102 m (335 ft)
- Highest elevation: 133 m (436 ft)
- Lowest elevation: 57 m (187 ft)
- Population (2023): 335
  - Density: 25.4/km^{2} (65.7/sq mi)
- Time zone: UTC+01:00 (CET)
  - Summer (DST): UTC+02:00 (CEST)
- INSEE/Postal code: 16074 /16300
- ^{1} French Land Register data, which excludes lakes, ponds, glaciers > 1 km^{2} (0.386 sq mi or 247 acres) and river estuaries.

Challignac (French pronunciation: [ʃaliɲak]) is a commune in the Charente department in southwestern France.

== Population ==
Historical population
Year	Pop.	±% p.a.
1968	344	—
1975	257	−4.08%
1982	288	+1.64%
1990	327	+1.60%
1999	314	−0.45%
2007	299	−0.61%
2012	311	+0.79%
2017	324	+0.82%
2023	335	+0.56%
Source: INSEE

== See also ==
- Communes of the Charente department
