= Brie-sous-Barbezieux =

- Commune
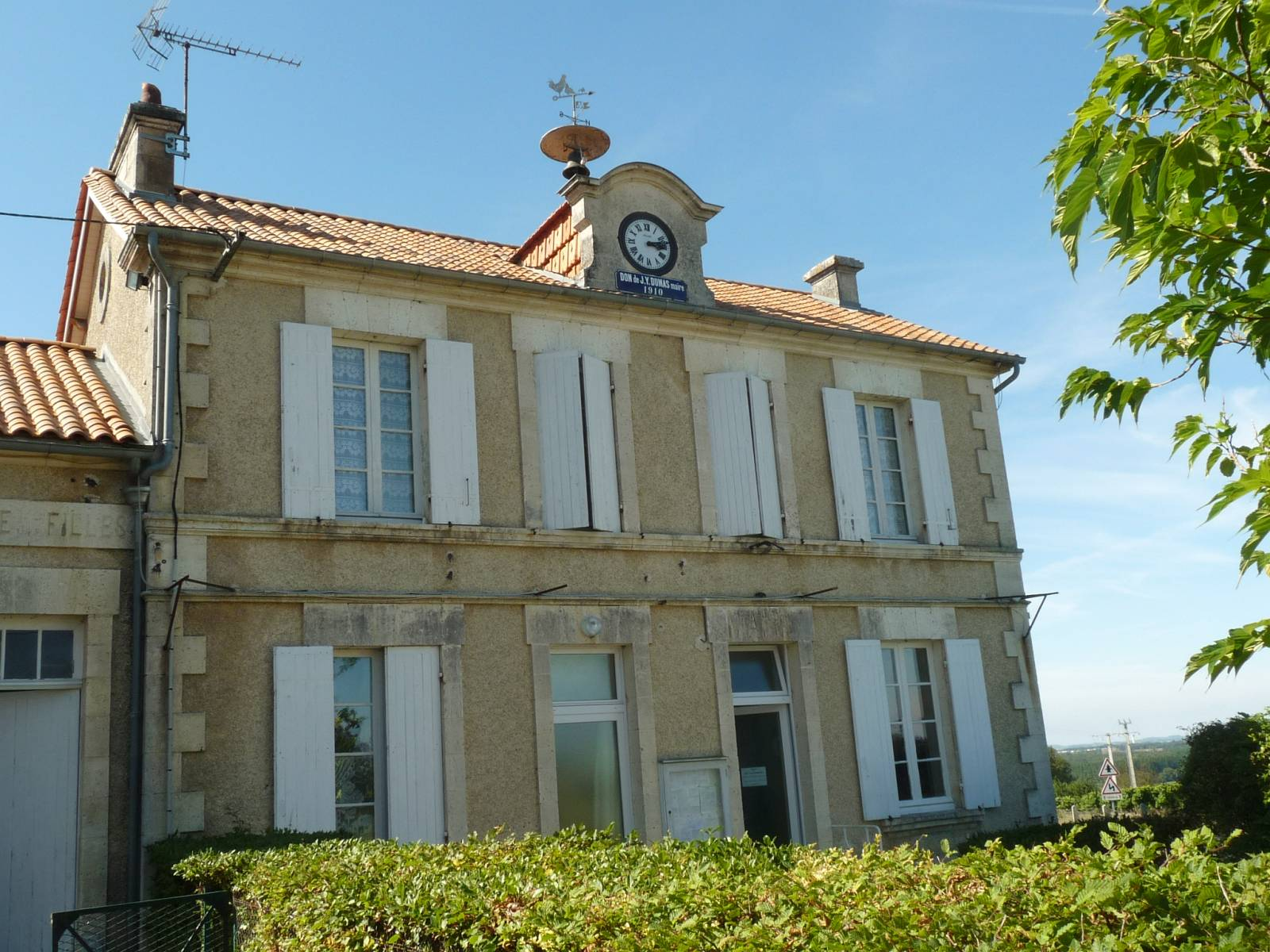
- Town hall
- Location of Brie-sous-Barbezieux
- Location within France Location within Nouvelle-Aquitaine
- Coordinates: 45°25′21″N 0°02′19″W
- Country: France
- Region: Nouvelle-Aquitaine
- Department: Charente
- Arrondissement: Cognac
- Canton: Charente-Sud

Government
  - Mayor (2020–2026): Jean-Pierre Élion
- Area^{1}: 6.5 km^{2} (2.5 sq mi)
- Elevation: 104 m (341 ft)
- Highest elevation: 162 m (531 ft)
- Lowest elevation: 67 m (220 ft)
- Population (2023): 109
  - Density: 17/km^{2} (43/sq mi)
- Time zone: UTC+01:00 (CET)
  - Summer (DST): UTC+02:00 (CEST)
- INSEE/Postal code: 16062 /16300
- ^{1} French Land Register data, which excludes lakes, ponds, glaciers > 1 km^{2} (0.386 sq mi or 247 acres) and river estuaries.

Brie-sous-Barbezieux (French pronunciation: [bʁi su baʁbəzjø], literally Brie under Barbezieux) is a commune in the Charente department in southwestern France.

== Population ==
Historical population
Year	Pop.	±% p.a.
1968	156	—
1975	143	−1.24%
1982	146	+0.30%
1990	145	−0.09%
1999	124	−1.72%
2007	109	−1.60%
2012	113	+0.72%
2017	130	+2.84%
2023	109	−2.89%
Source: INSEE

== See also ==
- Communes of the Charente department
