= Chillac =

- Commune
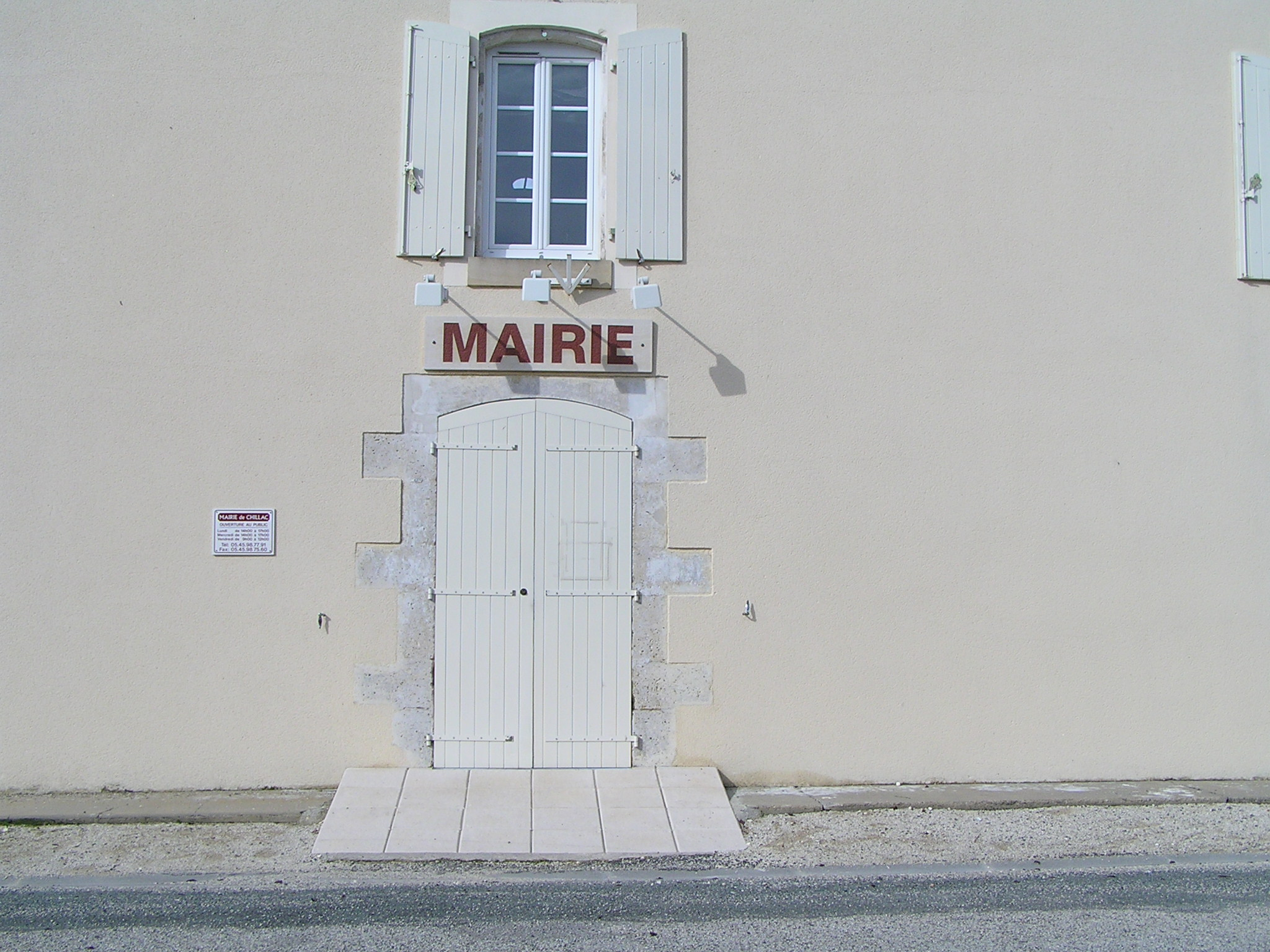
- Town hall
- Location of Chillac
- Location within France Location within Nouvelle-Aquitaine
- Coordinates: 45°21′44″N 0°04′55″W
- Country: France
- Region: Nouvelle-Aquitaine
- Department: Charente
- Arrondissement: Cognac
- Canton: Charente-Sud

Government
  - Mayor (2020–2026): Marie-Hélène Gouffrant
- Area^{1}: 14.61 km^{2} (5.64 sq mi)
- Elevation: 172 m (564 ft)
- Highest elevation: 183 m (600 ft)
- Lowest elevation: 84 m (276 ft)
- Population (2023): 227
  - Density: 15.5/km^{2} (40.2/sq mi)
- Time zone: UTC+01:00 (CET)
  - Summer (DST): UTC+02:00 (CEST)
- INSEE/Postal code: 16099 /16480
- ^{1} French Land Register data, which excludes lakes, ponds, glaciers > 1 km^{2} (0.386 sq mi or 247 acres) and river estuaries.

Chillac (French pronunciation: [ʃijak]) is a commune in the Charente department in southwestern France.

== Population ==
Historical population
Year	Pop.	±% p.a.
1968	229	—
1975	223	−0.38%
1982	188	−2.41%
1990	165	−1.62%
1999	169	+0.27%
2007	199	+2.06%
2012	199	+0.00%
2017	220	+2.03%
2023	227	+0.52%
Source: INSEE

== See also ==
- Communes of the Charente department
