= Sauvignac =

- Commune
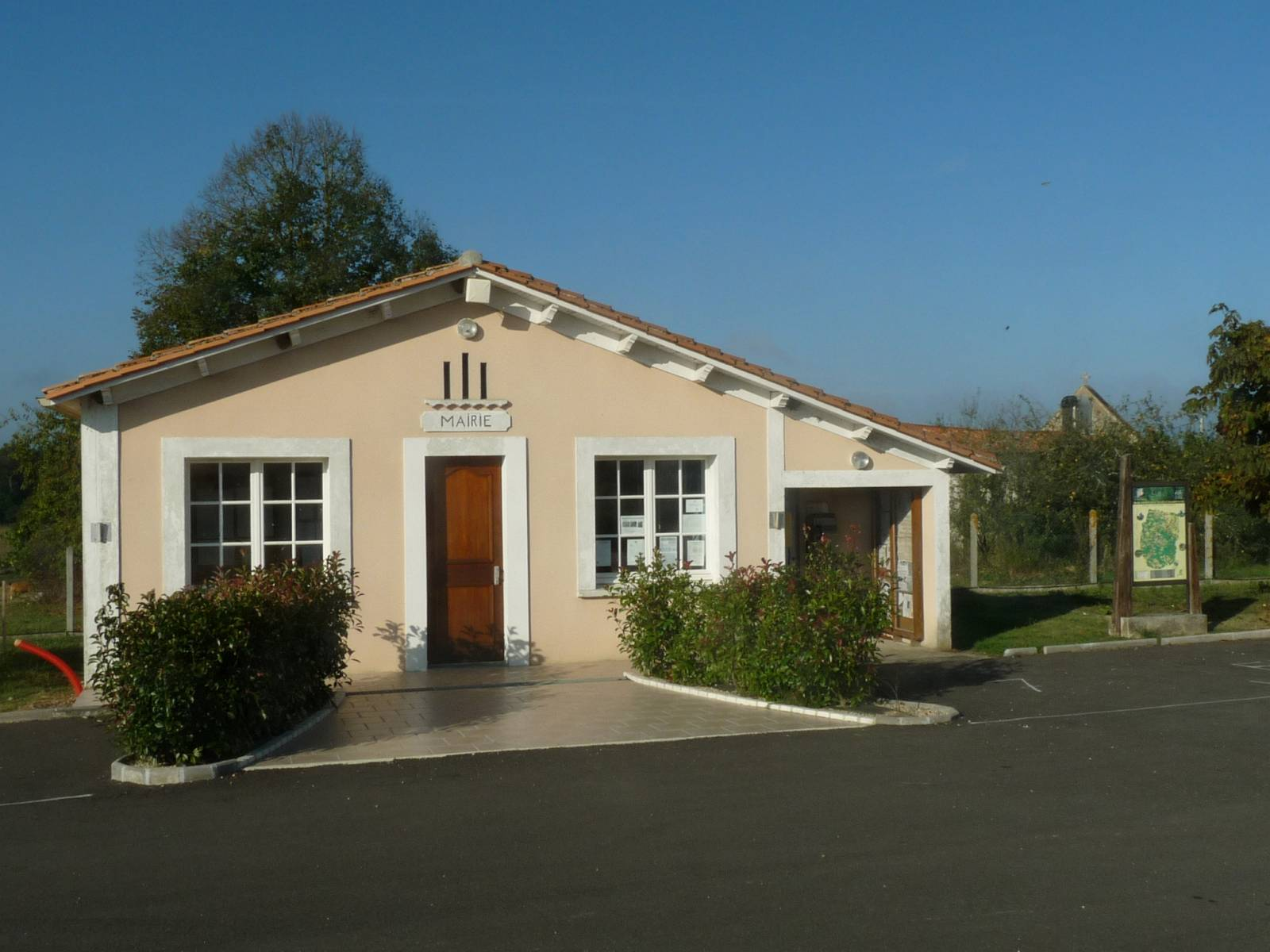
- Town hall
- Location of Sauvignac
- Location within France Location within Nouvelle-Aquitaine
- Coordinates: 45°15′27″N 0°04′49″W
- Country: France
- Region: Nouvelle-Aquitaine
- Department: Charente
- Arrondissement: Cognac
- Canton: Charente-Sud

Government
  - Mayor (2020–2026): Dominique Bodet
- Area^{1}: 11.62 km^{2} (4.49 sq mi)
- Elevation: 99 m (325 ft)
- Highest elevation: 131 m (430 ft)
- Lowest elevation: 49 m (161 ft)
- Population (2023): 95
  - Density: 8.2/km^{2} (21/sq mi)
- Time zone: UTC+01:00 (CET)
  - Summer (DST): UTC+02:00 (CEST)
- INSEE/Postal code: 16365 /16480
- ^{1} French Land Register data, which excludes lakes, ponds, glaciers > 1 km^{2} (0.386 sq mi or 247 acres) and river estuaries.

Sauvignac (French pronunciation: [soviɲak]) is a commune in the Charente department in southwestern France.

== Population ==
Historical population
Year	Pop.	±% p.a.
1968	154	—
1975	148	−0.57%
1982	121	−2.84%
1990	102	−2.11%
1999	96	−0.67%
2007	104	+1.01%
2012	96	−1.59%
2017	104	+1.61%
2023	95	−1.50%
Source: INSEE

== See also ==
- Communes of the Charente department
