= Étriac =

- Commune
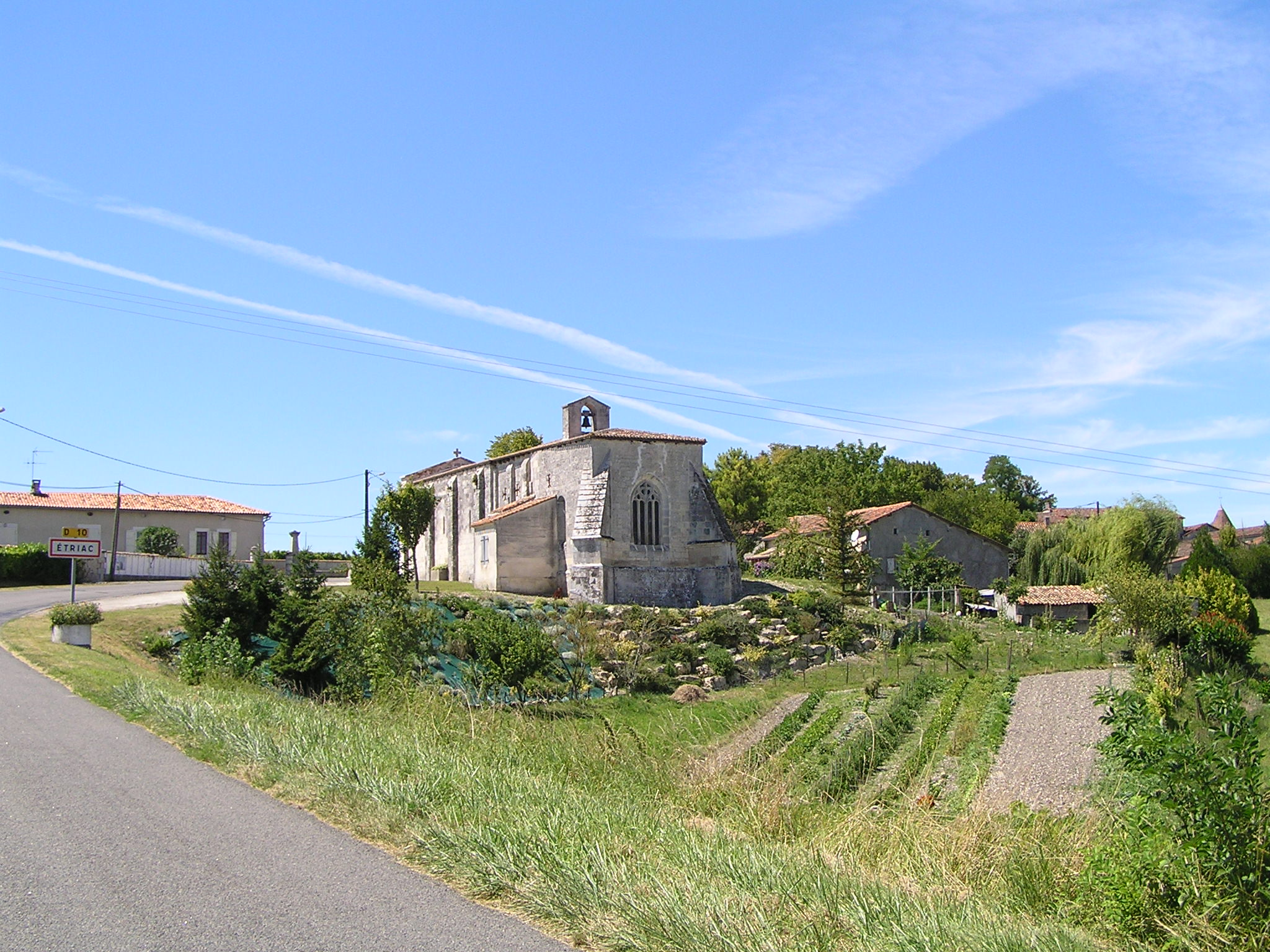
- The church and surroundings in Étriac
- Location of Étriac
- Location within France Location within Nouvelle-Aquitaine
- Coordinates: 45°31′45″N 0°01′28″W
- Country: France
- Region: Nouvelle-Aquitaine
- Department: Charente
- Arrondissement: Cognac
- Canton: Charente-Sud

Government
  - Mayor (2020–2026): Frédéric Baron
- Area^{1}: 9.47 km^{2} (3.66 sq mi)
- Elevation: 129 m (423 ft)
- Highest elevation: 149 m (489 ft)
- Lowest elevation: 57 m (187 ft)
- Population (2023): 206
  - Density: 21.8/km^{2} (56.3/sq mi)
- Time zone: UTC+01:00 (CET)
  - Summer (DST): UTC+02:00 (CEST)
- INSEE/Postal code: 16133 /16250
- ^{1} French Land Register data, which excludes lakes, ponds, glaciers > 1 km^{2} (0.386 sq mi or 247 acres) and river estuaries.

Étriac (French pronunciation: [etʁijak]) is a commune in the Charente department in southwestern France.

== Population ==
Historical population
Year	Pop.	±% p.a.
1968	162	—
1975	157	−0.45%
1982	154	−0.28%
1990	175	+1.61%
1999	165	−0.65%
2007	186	+1.51%
2012	200	+1.46%
2017	201	+0.10%
2023	206	+0.41%
Source: INSEE

== See also ==
- Communes of the Charente department
