= Bécheresse =

- Commune
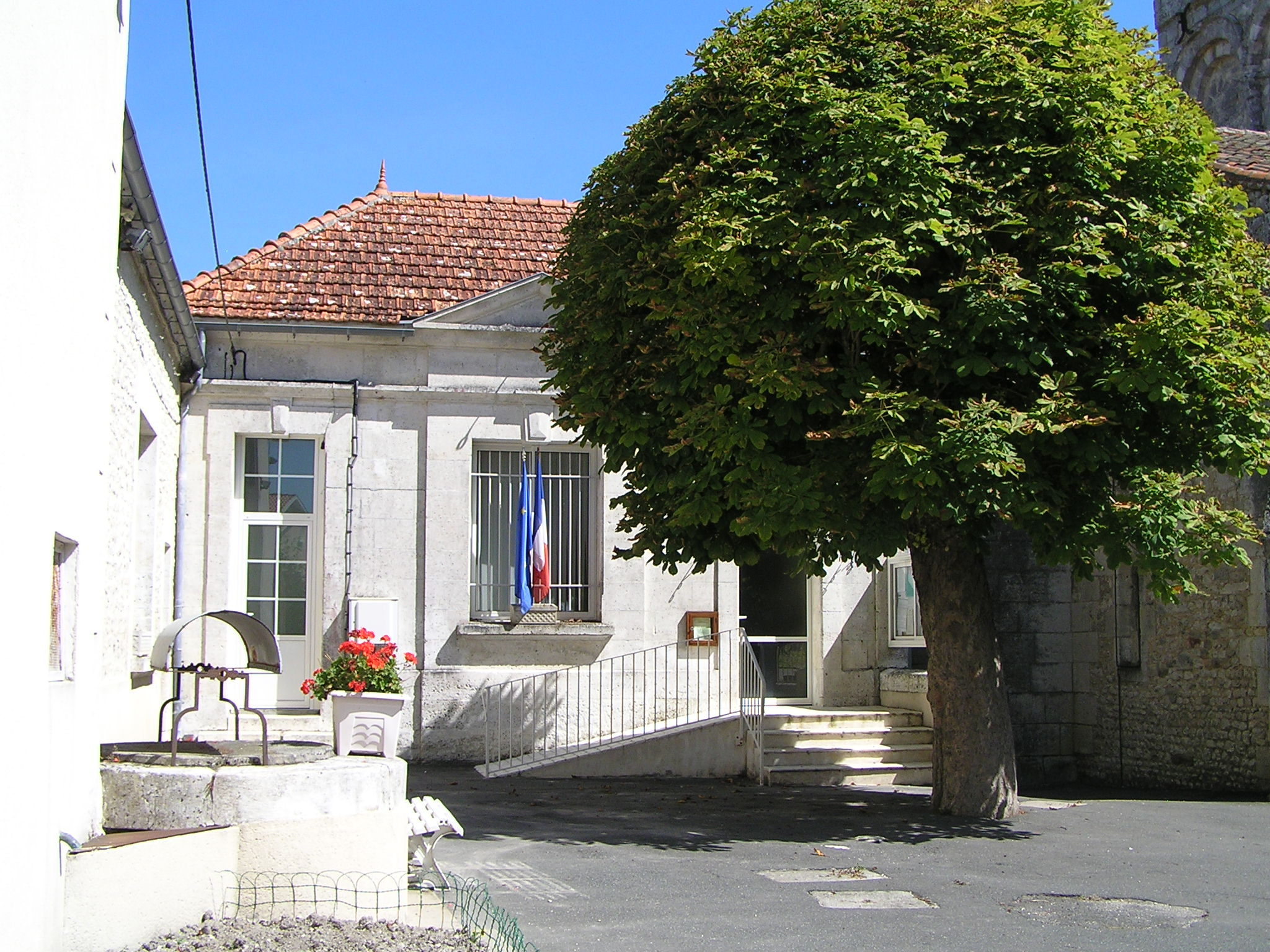
- Town hall
- Location of Bécheresse
- Location within France Location within Nouvelle-Aquitaine
- Coordinates: 45°30′01″N 0°05′04″E
- Country: France
- Region: Nouvelle-Aquitaine
- Department: Charente
- Arrondissement: Cognac
- Canton: Charente-Sud
- Intercommunality: 4B Sud-Charente

Government
  - Mayor (2020–2026): Jean-Pierre Herrouet
- Area^{1}: 8.38 km^{2} (3.24 sq mi)
- Elevation: 183 m (600 ft)
- Highest elevation: 183 m (600 ft)
- Lowest elevation: 95 m (312 ft)
- Population (2023): 290
  - Density: 35/km^{2} (90/sq mi)
- Time zone: UTC+01:00 (CET)
  - Summer (DST): UTC+02:00 (CEST)
- INSEE/Postal code: 16036 /16250
- ^{1} French Land Register data, which excludes lakes, ponds, glaciers > 1 km^{2} (0.386 sq mi or 247 acres) and river estuaries.

Bécheresse (French pronunciation: [beʃʁɛs]) is a commune in the Charente department in southwestern France.

== Population ==
Historical population
Year	Pop.	±% p.a.
1968	259	—
1975	218	−2.43%
1982	246	+1.74%
1990	217	−1.56%
1999	207	−0.52%
2007	231	+1.38%
2012	304	+5.65%
2017	290	−0.94%
2023	290	+0.00%
Source: INSEE

== See also ==
- Communes of the Charente department
