= Pérignac, Charente =

Pérignac
- Commune
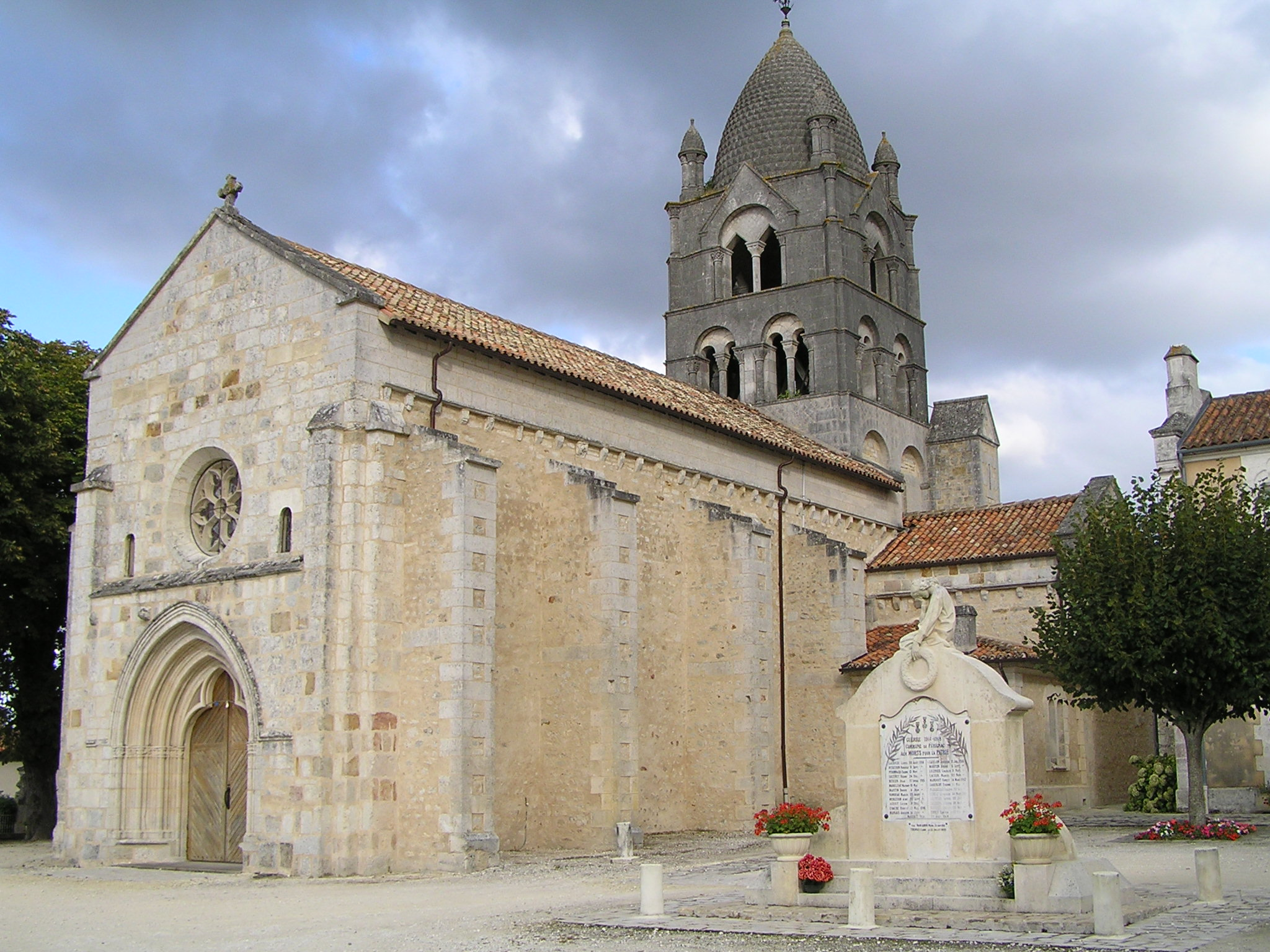
- The church in Pérignac
- Location of Pérignac
- Location within France Location within Nouvelle-Aquitaine
- Coordinates: 45°27′55″N 0°04′42″E
- Country: France
- Region: Nouvelle-Aquitaine
- Department: Charente
- Arrondissement: Cognac
- Canton: Charente-Sud

Government
  - Mayor (2020–2026): Thierry Montenon
- Area^{1}: 25.52 km^{2} (9.85 sq mi)
- Elevation: 182 m (597 ft)
- Highest elevation: 189 m (620 ft)
- Lowest elevation: 77 m (253 ft)
- Population (2023): 495
  - Density: 19.4/km^{2} (50.2/sq mi)
- Time zone: UTC+01:00 (CET)
  - Summer (DST): UTC+02:00 (CEST)
- INSEE/Postal code: 16258 /16250
- ^{1} French Land Register data, which excludes lakes, ponds, glaciers > 1 km^{2} (0.386 sq mi or 247 acres) and river estuaries.

Pérignac (French pronunciation: [peʁiɲak]) is a commune in the Charente department in southwestern France.

== Population ==
Historical population
Year	Pop.	±% p.a.
1968	501	—
1975	467	−1.00%
1982	430	−1.17%
1990	475	+1.25%
1999	485	+0.23%
2007	542	+1.40%
2012	536	−0.22%
2017	462	−2.93%
2023	495	+1.16%
Source: INSEE

The residents are called Pérignacais in French.

== See also ==
- Communes of the Charente department
