= Canton of Charente-Sud =

Coordinates: 45°28′25″N 0°09′15″W

Charente-Sud
- Canton
- Country: France
- Region: Nouvelle-Aquitaine
- Department: Charente
- No. of communes: {{{nbcomm}}}
- Area: 628.75 km^{2} (242.76 sq mi)
- Population (2023): 20,018
  - Density: 31.838/km^{2} (82.459/sq mi)
- INSEE code: 16 09

The canton of Charente-Sud is an administrative division in the Charente department, France. It was created following the French canton reorganisation which came into effect in March 2015 from the former cantons of Barbezieux-Saint-Hilaire, Blanzac-Porcheresse and Brossac. It consists of 46 communes (9 of which merged into the new communes Val-des-Vignes, Montmérac and Coteaux du Blanzacais):

1. Angeduc
2. Baignes-Sainte-Radegonde
3. Barbezieux-Saint-Hilaire
4. Barret
5. Bécheresse
6. Berneuil
7. Boisbreteau
8. Bors
9. Brie-sous-Barbezieux
10. Brossac
11. Challignac
12. Champagne-Vigny
13. Chantillac
14. Chillac
15. Condéon
16. Coteaux du Blanzacais
17. Étriac
18. Guimps
19. Guizengeard
20. Lachaise
21. Ladiville
22. Lagarde-sur-le-Né
23. Montmérac
24. Oriolles
25. Passirac
26. Pérignac
27. Reignac
28. Saint-Aulais-la-Chapelle
29. Saint-Bonnet
30. Sainte-Souline
31. Saint-Félix
32. Saint-Médard
33. Saint-Palais-du-Né
34. Saint-Vallier
35. Salles-de-Barbezieux
36. Sauvignac
37. Le Tâtre
38. Touvérac
39. Val-des-Vignes
40. Vignolles

== See also ==
- Cantons of the Charente department
- Communes of France
