= Berneuil, Charente =

Berneuil
- Commune
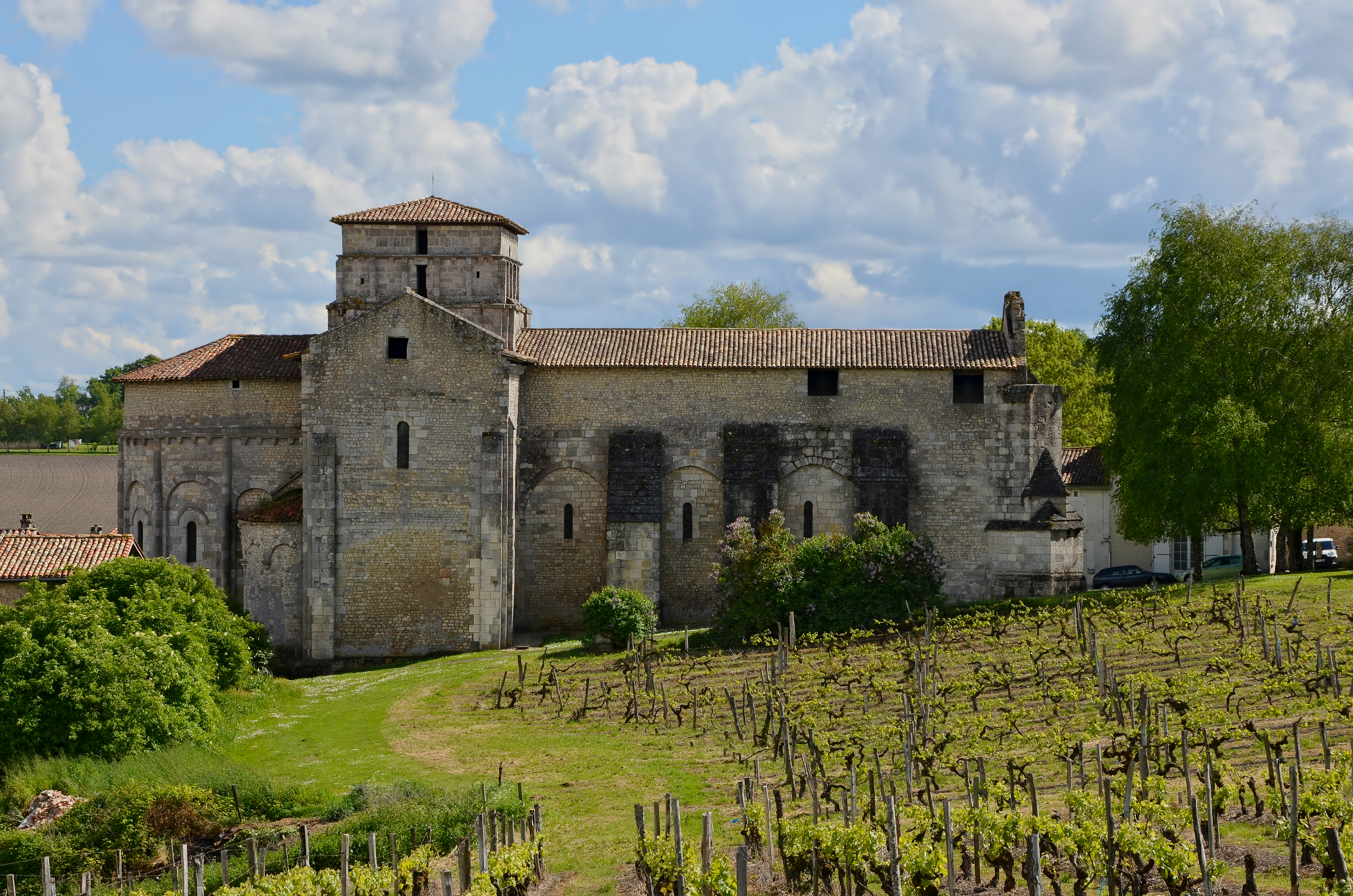
- The church in Berneuil
- Location of Berneuil
- Location within France Location within Nouvelle-Aquitaine
- Coordinates: 45°23′38″N 0°04′17″W
- Country: France
- Region: Nouvelle-Aquitaine
- Department: Charente
- Arrondissement: Cognac
- Canton: Charente-Sud

Government
  - Mayor (2020–2026): Marie-Claude Guetté
- Area^{1}: 16.55 km^{2} (6.39 sq mi)
- Elevation: 146 m (479 ft)
- Highest elevation: 166 m (545 ft)
- Lowest elevation: 74 m (243 ft)
- Population (2023): 325
  - Density: 19.6/km^{2} (50.9/sq mi)
- Time zone: UTC+01:00 (CET)
  - Summer (DST): UTC+02:00 (CEST)
- INSEE/Postal code: 16040 /16480
- ^{1} French Land Register data, which excludes lakes, ponds, glaciers > 1 km^{2} (0.386 sq mi or 247 acres) and river estuaries.

Berneuil (French pronunciation: [bɛʁnœj]) is a commune in the Charente department in southwestern France.

== Population ==
Historical population
Year	Pop.	±% p.a.
1968	386	—
1975	354	−1.23%
1982	340	−0.57%
1990	326	−0.52%
1999	317	−0.31%
2007	329	+0.47%
2012	321	−0.49%
2017	316	−0.31%
2023	325	+0.47%
Source: INSEE

== See also ==
- Communes of the Charente department
