= Saint-Sornin =

Saint-Sornin may refer to the following places in France:

- Saint-Sornin, Allier, a commune in the department of Allier
- Saint-Sornin, Charente, a commune in the department of Charente
- Saint-Sornin, Charente-Maritime, a commune in the department of Charente-Maritime
- Saint-Sornin-la-Marche, a commune in the department of Haute-Vienne
- Saint-Sornin-Lavolps, a commune in the department of Corrèze
- Saint-Sornin-Leulac, a commune in the department of Haute-Vienne
