= Saint-Germain-de-Montbron =

- Commune
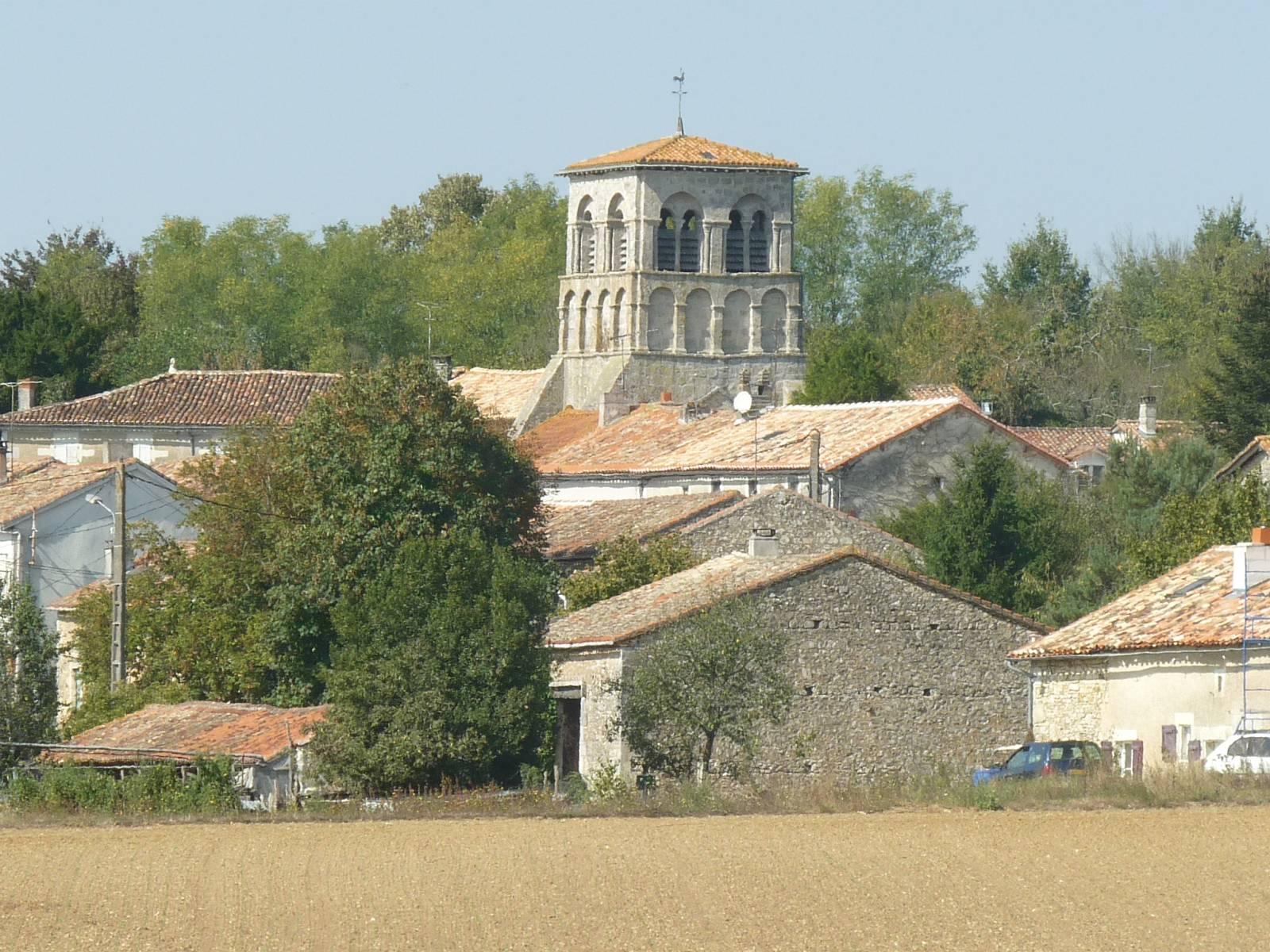
- The church in Saint-Germain-de-Montbron
- Location of Saint-Germain-de-Montbron
- Location within France Location within Nouvelle-Aquitaine
- Coordinates: 45°37′26″N 0°25′14″E
- Country: France
- Region: Nouvelle-Aquitaine
- Department: Charente
- Arrondissement: Angoulême
- Canton: Val de Tardoire
- Intercommunality: La Rochefoucauld - Porte du Périgord

Government
  - Mayor (2020–2026): Danielle Combeau
- Area^{1}: 14.91 km^{2} (5.76 sq mi)
- Elevation: 110 m (360 ft)
- Highest elevation: 182 m (597 ft)
- Lowest elevation: 93 m (305 ft)
- Population (2023): 500
  - Density: 34/km^{2} (87/sq mi)
- Time zone: UTC+01:00 (CET)
  - Summer (DST): UTC+02:00 (CEST)
- INSEE/Postal code: 16323 /16380
- ^{1} French Land Register data, which excludes lakes, ponds, glaciers > 1 km^{2} (0.386 sq mi or 247 acres) and river estuaries.

Saint-Germain-de-Montbron (French pronunciation: [sɛ̃ ʒɛʁmɛ̃ də mɔ̃bʁɔ̃], literally Saint-Germain of Montbron; Occitan: Sent German de Montberol) is a commune in the Charente department in southwestern France.

== Population ==
Historical population
Year	Pop.	±% p.a.
1968	445	—
1975	456	+0.35%
1982	458	+0.06%
1990	436	−0.61%
1999	434	−0.05%
2007	464	+0.84%
2012	505	+1.71%
2017	477	−1.13%
2023	500	+0.79%
Source: INSEE

== See also ==
- Communes of the Charente department
