= Communes of the Charente department =

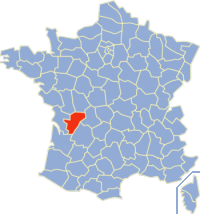

The following is a list of the 359 communes of the Charente department of France on 1 January 2025.

The communes cooperate in the following intercommunalities (as of 2025):

- Communauté d'agglomération Grand Angoulême
- Communauté d'agglomération du Grand Cognac
- Communauté de communes des 4B Sud-Charente
- Communauté de communes de Charente Limousine
- Communauté de communes Cœur de Charente
- Communauté de communes Lavalette Tude Dronne
- Communauté de communes La Rochefoucauld - Porte du Périgord
- Communauté de communes du Rouillacais
- Communauté de communes Val de Charente

INSEE	Postal	Commune
16001	16500	Abzac
16002	16700	Les Adjots
16003	16110	Agris
16005	16140	Aigre
16007	16490	Alloue
16008	16140	Ambérac
16009	16490	Ambernac
16011	16560	Anais
16012	16130	Angeac-Champagne
16013	16120	Angeac-Charente
16014	16300	Angeduc
16015	16000	Angoulême
16016	16500	Ansac-sur-Vienne
16018	16130	Ars
16019	16290	Asnières-sur-Nouère
16020	16390	Aubeterre-sur-Dronne
16023	16460	Aunac-sur-Charente
16024	16560	Aussac-Vadalle
16025	16360	Baignes-Sainte-Radegonde
16026	16430	Balzac
16027	16140	Barbezières
16028	16300	Barbezieux-Saint-Hilaire
16029	16210	Bardenac
16030	16300	Barret
16031	16700	Barro
16032	16120	Bassac
16034	16210	Bazac
16035	16450	Beaulieu-sur-Sonnette
16036	16250	Bécheresse
16204	16120	Bellevigne
16037	16210	Bellon
16038	16350	Benest
16039	16700	Bernac
16040	16480	Berneuil
16041	16250	Bessac
16042	16140	Bessé
16044	16700	Bioussac
16045	16120	Birac
16047	16320	Blanzaguet-Saint-Cybard
16048	16480	Boisbreteau
16082	16320	Boisné-la-Tude
16393	16330	La Boixe
16049	16390	Bonnes
16050	16120	Bonneuil
16053	16360	Bors-de-Baignes
16052	16190	Bors-de-Montmoreau
16054	16350	Le Bouchage
16055	16410	Bouëx
16056	16200	Bourg-Charente
16057	16120	Bouteville
16058	16100	Boutiers-Saint-Trojan
16059	16240	Brettes
16060	16370	Bréville
16061	16590	Brie
16062	16300	Brie-sous-Barbezieux
16063	16210	Brie-sous-Chalais
16064	16420	Brigueuil
16065	16500	Brillac
16066	16480	Brossac
16067	16110	Bunzac
16068	16260	Cellefrouin
16069	16230	Cellettes
16070	16150	Chabanais
16071	16150	Chabrac
16072	16250	Chadurie
16073	16210	Chalais
16074	16300	Challignac
16076	16350	Champagne-Mouton
16075	16250	Champagne-Vigny
16077	16290	Champmillon
16078	16430	Champniers
16079	16360	Chantillac
16081	16140	La Chapelle
16083	16140	Charmé
16084	16380	Charras
16085	16260	Chasseneuil-sur-Bonnieure
16086	16150	Chassenon
16087	16350	Chassiecq
16088	16200	Chassors
16089	16100	Châteaubernard
16090	16120	Châteauneuf-sur-Charente
16091	16480	Châtignac
16093	16380	Chazelles
16095	16460	Chenon
16096	16310	Cherves-Châtelars
16098	16240	La Chèvrerie
16099	16480	Chillac
16100	16150	Chirac
16101	16440	Claix
16102	16100	Cognac
16103	16320	Combiers
16104	16700	Condac
16105	16360	Condéon
16106	16500	Confolens
16046	16250	Coteaux du Blanzacais
16107	16560	Coulgens
16108	16330	Coulonges
16109	16200	Courbillac
16110	16240	Courcôme
16111	16190	Courgeac
16112	16210	Courlac
16113	16400	La Couronne
16114	16460	Couture
16116	16300	Criteuil-la-Magdeleine
16117	16210	Curac
16118	16190	Deviat
16119	16410	Dignac
16120	16410	Dirac
16121	16290	Douzat
16122	16140	Ébréon
16123	16170	Échallat
16124	16220	Écuras
16125	16320	Édon
16127	16240	Empuré
16128	16490	Épenède
16130	16210	Les Essards
16131	16500	Esse
16132	16150	Étagnac
16133	16250	Étriac
16134	16150	Exideuil-sur-Vienne
16135	16220	Eymouthiers
16136	16700	La Faye
16137	16380	Feuillade
16138	16730	Fléac
16139	16200	Fleurac
16141	16230	Fontenille
16142	16240	La Forêt-de-Tessé
16143	16410	Fouquebrune
16144	16140	Fouqueure
16145	16200	Foussignac
16146	16410	Garat
16148	16170	Genac-Bignac
16150	16130	Gensac-la-Pallue
16151	16130	Genté
16152	16130	Gimeux
16154	16160	Gond-Pontouvre
16155	16140	Les Gours
16157	16450	Le Grand-Madieu
16158	16380	Grassac
16297	16120	Graves-Saint-Amant
16160	16300	Guimps
16161	16480	Guizengeard
16162	16320	Gurat
16163	16290	Hiersac
16164	16490	Hiesse
16165	16200	Houlette
16166	16340	L'Isle-d'Espagnac
16167	16200	Jarnac
16168	16560	Jauldes
16169	16100	Javrezac
16170	16190	Juignac
16171	16130	Juillac-le-Coq
16173	16230	Juillé
16174	16200	Julienne
16176	16300	Lachaise
16177	16120	Ladiville
16178	16300	Lagarde-sur-le-Né
16180	16390	Laprade
16183	16310	Lésignac-Durand
16181	16500	Lessac
16182	16420	Lesterps
16184	16460	Lichères
16185	16140	Ligné
16186	16130	Lignières-Ambleville
16187	16730	Linars
16188	16310	Le Lindois
16189	16700	Londigny
16190	16240	Longré
16191	16230	Lonnes
16193	16100	Louzac-Saint-André
16194	16140	Lupsault
16195	16450	Lussac
16196	16230	Luxé
16197	16240	La Magdeleine
16198	16320	Magnac-lès-Gardes
16199	16600	Magnac-sur-Touvre
16200	16230	Maine-de-Boixe
16153	16200	Mainxe-Gondeville
16203	16380	Mainzac
16205	16500	Manot
16206	16230	Mansle-les-Fontaines

INSEE	Postal	Commune
16207	16140	Marcillac-Lanville
16208	16170	Mareuil
16209	16110	Marillac-le-Franc
16210	16570	Marsac
16211	16380	Marthon
16212	16310	Massignac
16213	16310	Mazerolles
16215	16210	Médillac
16216	16200	Mérignac
16217	16100	Merpins
16218	16370	Mesnac
16220	16200	Les Métairies
16221	16140	Mons
16222	16620	Montboyer
16223	16220	Montbron
16225	16310	Montembœuf
16227	16390	Montignac-le-Coq
16229	16240	Montjean
16224	16300	Montmérac
16230	16190	Montmoreau
16231	16420	Montrollet
16232	16600	Mornac
16233	16120	Mosnac-Saint-Simeux
16234	16290	Moulidars
16406	16220	Moulins-sur-Tardoire
16236	16440	Mouthiers-sur-Boëme
16237	16460	Mouton
16239	16310	Mouzon
16240	16390	Nabinaud
16241	16230	Nanclars
16242	16700	Nanteuil-en-Vallée
16243	16200	Nercillac
16244	16440	Nersac
16245	16270	Nieuil
16246	16190	Nonac
16248	16140	Oradour d'Aigre
16249	16500	Oradour-Fanais
16250	16220	Orgedeuil
16251	16480	Oriolles
16252	16210	Orival
16253	16240	Paizay-Naudouin-Embourie
16254	16390	Palluaud
16255	16450	Parzac
16256	16480	Passirac
16258	16250	Pérignac
16260	16390	Pillac
16261	16260	Les Pins
16263	16250	Plassac-Rouffiac
16264	16490	Pleuville
16267	16190	Poullignac
16268	16700	Poursac
16269	16110	Pranzac
16270	16150	Pressignac
16271	16400	Puymoyen
16272	16230	Puyréaux
16273	16240	Raix
16275	16140	Ranville-Breuillaud
16276	16360	Reignac
16277	16200	Réparsac
16279	16210	Rioux-Martin
16280	16110	Rivières
16281	16110	La Rochefoucauld-en-Angoumois
16282	16110	La Rochette
16283	16320	Ronsenac
16284	16210	Rouffiac
16285	16320	Rougnac
16286	16170	Rouillac
16287	16440	Roullet-Saint-Estèphe
16289	16310	Roussines
16290	16220	Rouzède
16291	16600	Ruelle-sur-Touvre
16292	16700	Ruffec
16293	16310	Saint-Adjutory
16295	16330	Saint-Amant-de-Boixe
16298	16170	Saint-Amant-de-Nouère
16301	16300	Saint-Aulais-la-Chapelle
16302	16210	Saint-Avit
16303	16300	Saint-Bonnet
16304	16100	Saint-Brice
16306	16420	Saint-Christophe
16307	16230	Saint-Ciers-sur-Bonnieure
16308	16450	Saint-Claud
16310	16350	Saint-Coutant
16312	16170	Saint-Cybardeaux
16349	16200	Sainte-Sévère
16354	16480	Sainte-Souline
16315	16480	Saint-Félix
16316	16130	Saint-Fort-sur-le-Né
16317	16140	Saint-Fraigne
16318	16460	Saint-Front
16320	16570	Saint-Genis-d'Hiersac
16321	16700	Saint-Georges
16323	16380	Saint-Germain-de-Montbron
16325	16700	Saint-Gourson
16326	16230	Saint-Groux
16329	16450	Saint-Laurent-de-Céris
16330	16100	Saint-Laurent-de-Cognac
16331	16480	Saint-Laurent-des-Combes
16334	16190	Saint-Martial
16335	16700	Saint-Martin-du-Clocher
16336	16260	Saint-Mary
16337	16500	Saint-Maurice-des-Lions
16338	16300	Saint-Médard
16340	16720	Saint-Même-les-Carrières
16341	16470	Saint-Michel
16342	16300	Saint-Palais-du-Né
16343	16130	Saint-Preuil
16346	16210	Saint-Quentin-de-Chalais
16345	16150	Saint-Quentin-sur-Charente
16347	16210	Saint-Romain
16348	16290	Saint-Saturnin
16350	16390	Saint-Séverin
16352	16120	Saint-Simon
16353	16220	Saint-Sornin
16356	16460	Saint-Sulpice-de-Ruffec
16357	16480	Saint-Vallier
16358	16710	Saint-Yrieix-sur-Charente
16359	16130	Salles-d'Angles
16360	16300	Salles-de-Barbezieux
16361	16700	Salles-de-Villefagnan
16362	16190	Salles-Lavalette
16363	16420	Saulgond
16364	16310	Sauvagnac
16365	16480	Sauvignac
16366	16130	Segonzac
16368	16410	Sers
16369	16200	Sigogne
16370	16440	Sireuil
16372	16380	Souffrignac
16373	16240	Souvigné
16374	16800	Soyaux
16375	16260	Suaux
16377	16260	La Tâche
16378	16700	Taizé-Aizie
16379	16110	Taponnat-Fleurignac
16380	16360	Le Tâtre
16192	16270	Terres-de-Haute-Charente
16381	16240	Theil-Rabier
16382	16410	Torsac
16383	16560	Tourriers
16384	16360	Touvérac
16385	16600	Touvre
16387	16200	Triac-Lautrait
16388	16730	Trois-Palis
16389	16350	Turgon
16390	16140	Tusson
16339	16170	Val-d'Auge
16300	16230	Val-de-Bonnieure
16097	16370	Val-de-Cognac
16175	16250	Val-des-Vignes
16392	16460	Valence
16394	16320	Vaux-Lavalette
16395	16170	Vaux-Rouillac
16396	16460	Ventouse
16397	16140	Verdille
16398	16310	Verneuil
16399	16130	Verrières
16400	16510	Verteuil-sur-Charente
16401	16330	Vervant
16402	16120	Vibrac
16403	16350	Le Vieux-Cérier
16404	16350	Vieux-Ruffec
16405	16300	Vignolles
16408	16320	Villebois-Lavalette
16409	16240	Villefagnan
16412	16560	Villejoubert
16413	16240	Villiers-le-Roux
16414	16230	Villognon
16415	16430	Vindelle
16416	16310	Vitrac-Saint-Vincent
16418	16400	Vœuil-et-Giget
16419	16330	Vouharte
16420	16250	Voulgézac
16421	16220	Vouthon
16422	16410	Vouzan
16423	16330	Xambes
16424	16210	Yviers
16425	16110	Yvrac-et-Malleyrand
