= Eymouthiers =

- Commune
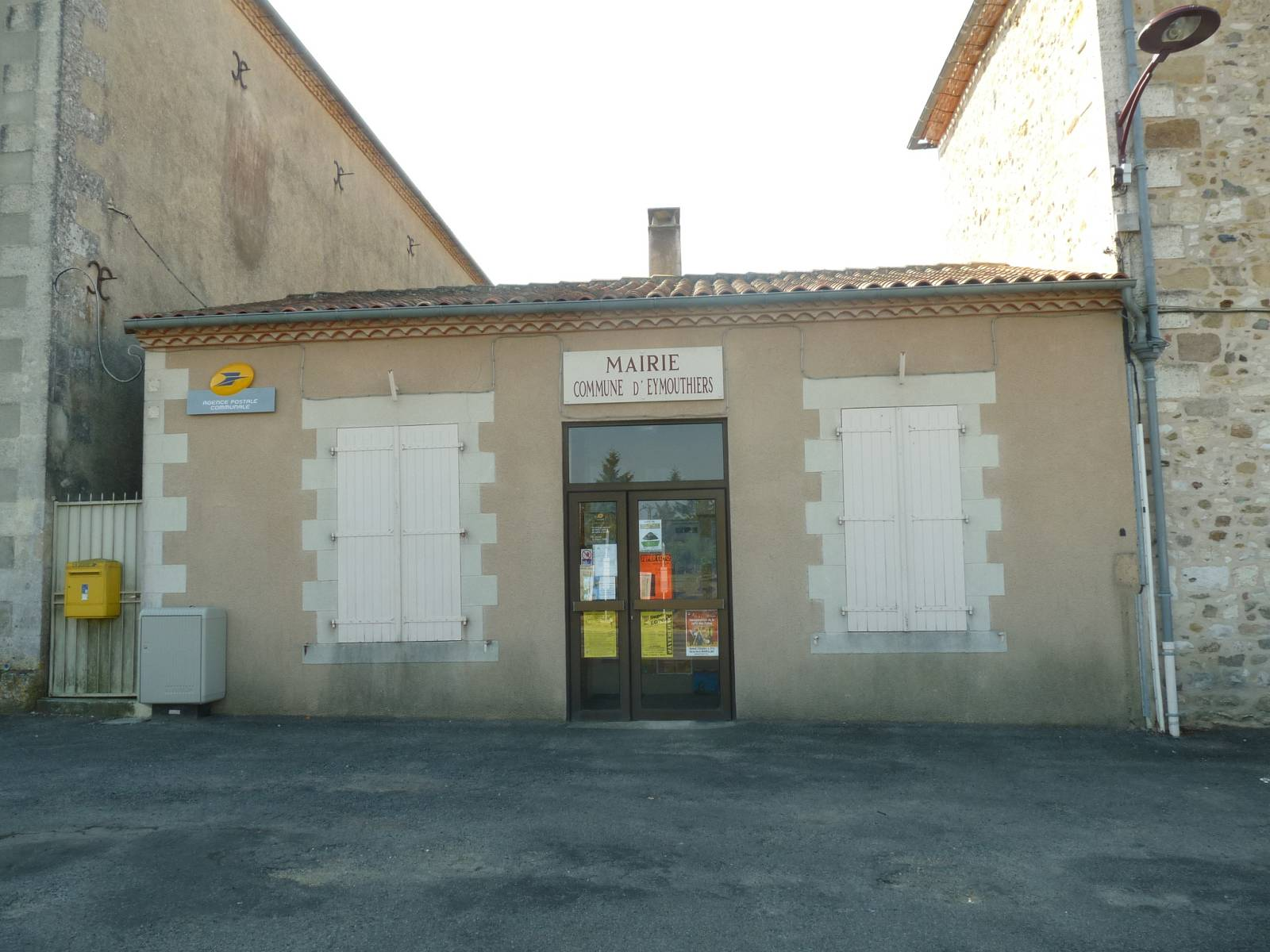
- The town hall in Eymouthiers
- Location of Eymouthiers
- Location within France Location within Nouvelle-Aquitaine
- Coordinates: 45°38′38″N 0°32′37″E
- Country: France
- Region: Nouvelle-Aquitaine
- Department: Charente
- Arrondissement: Angoulême
- Canton: Val de Tardoire

Government
  - Mayor (2020–2026): Jean-Pierre Chamouleaud
- Area^{1}: 8.68 km^{2} (3.35 sq mi)
- Elevation: 253 m (830 ft)
- Highest elevation: 254 m (833 ft)
- Lowest elevation: 118 m (387 ft)
- Population (2023): 315
  - Density: 36.3/km^{2} (94.0/sq mi)
- Time zone: UTC+01:00 (CET)
  - Summer (DST): UTC+02:00 (CEST)
- INSEE/Postal code: 16135 /16220
- ^{1} French Land Register data, which excludes lakes, ponds, glaciers > 1 km^{2} (0.386 sq mi or 247 acres) and river estuaries.

Eymouthiers (French pronunciation: [ɛmutje]) is a commune in the Charente department in southwestern France.

== Population ==
Historical population
Year	Pop.	±% p.a.
1968	237	—
1975	242	+0.30%
1982	235	−0.42%
1990	279	+2.17%
1999	296	+0.66%
2007	303	+0.29%
2012	298	−0.33%
2017	302	+0.27%
2023	315	+0.70%
Source: INSEE

== See also ==
- Communes of the Charente department
