= Châtignac =

- Commune
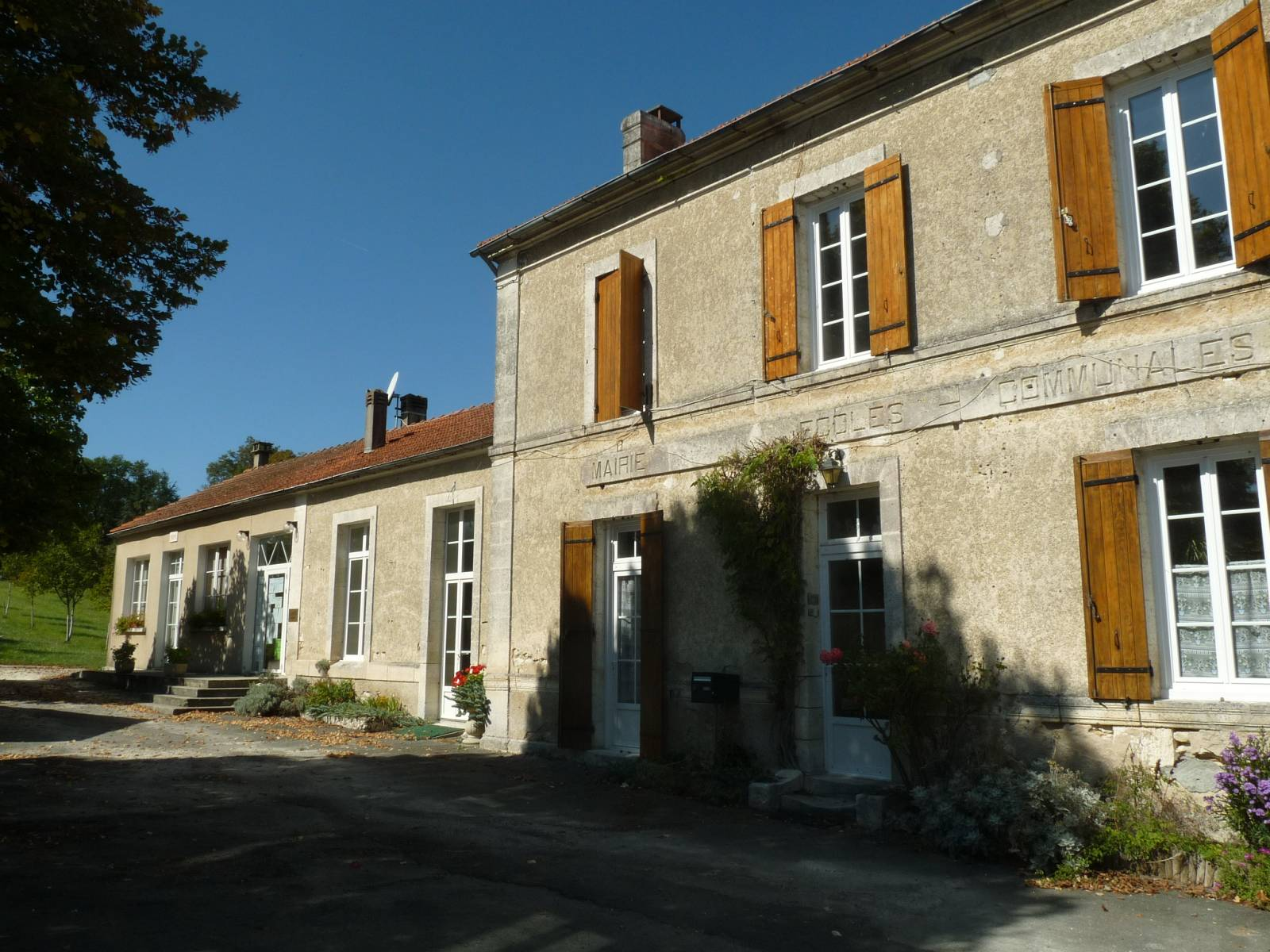
- Town hall
- Location of Châtignac
- Location within France Location within Nouvelle-Aquitaine
- Coordinates: 45°20′52″N 0°00′26″W
- Country: France
- Region: Nouvelle-Aquitaine
- Department: Charente
- Arrondissement: Angoulême
- Canton: Tude-et-Lavalette

Government
  - Mayor (2020–2026): Jean-Yves Ambaud
- Area^{1}: 9.75 km^{2} (3.76 sq mi)
- Elevation: 179 m (587 ft)
- Highest elevation: 190 m (620 ft)
- Lowest elevation: 71 m (233 ft)
- Population (2023): 163
  - Density: 16.7/km^{2} (43.3/sq mi)
- Time zone: UTC+01:00 (CET)
  - Summer (DST): UTC+02:00 (CEST)
- INSEE/Postal code: 16091 /16480
- ^{1} French Land Register data, which excludes lakes, ponds, glaciers > 1 km^{2} (0.386 sq mi or 247 acres) and river estuaries.

Châtignac (French pronunciation: [ʃatiɲak]) is a commune in the Charente department in southwestern France.

== Population ==
Historical population
Year	Pop.	±% p.a.
1968	191	—
1975	181	−0.77%
1982	158	−1.92%
1990	143	−1.24%
1999	185	+2.90%
2007	205	+1.29%
2012	196	−0.89%
2017	176	−2.13%
2023	163	−1.27%
Source: INSEE

== See also ==
- Communes of the Charente department
