= Taponnat-Fleurignac =

- Commune
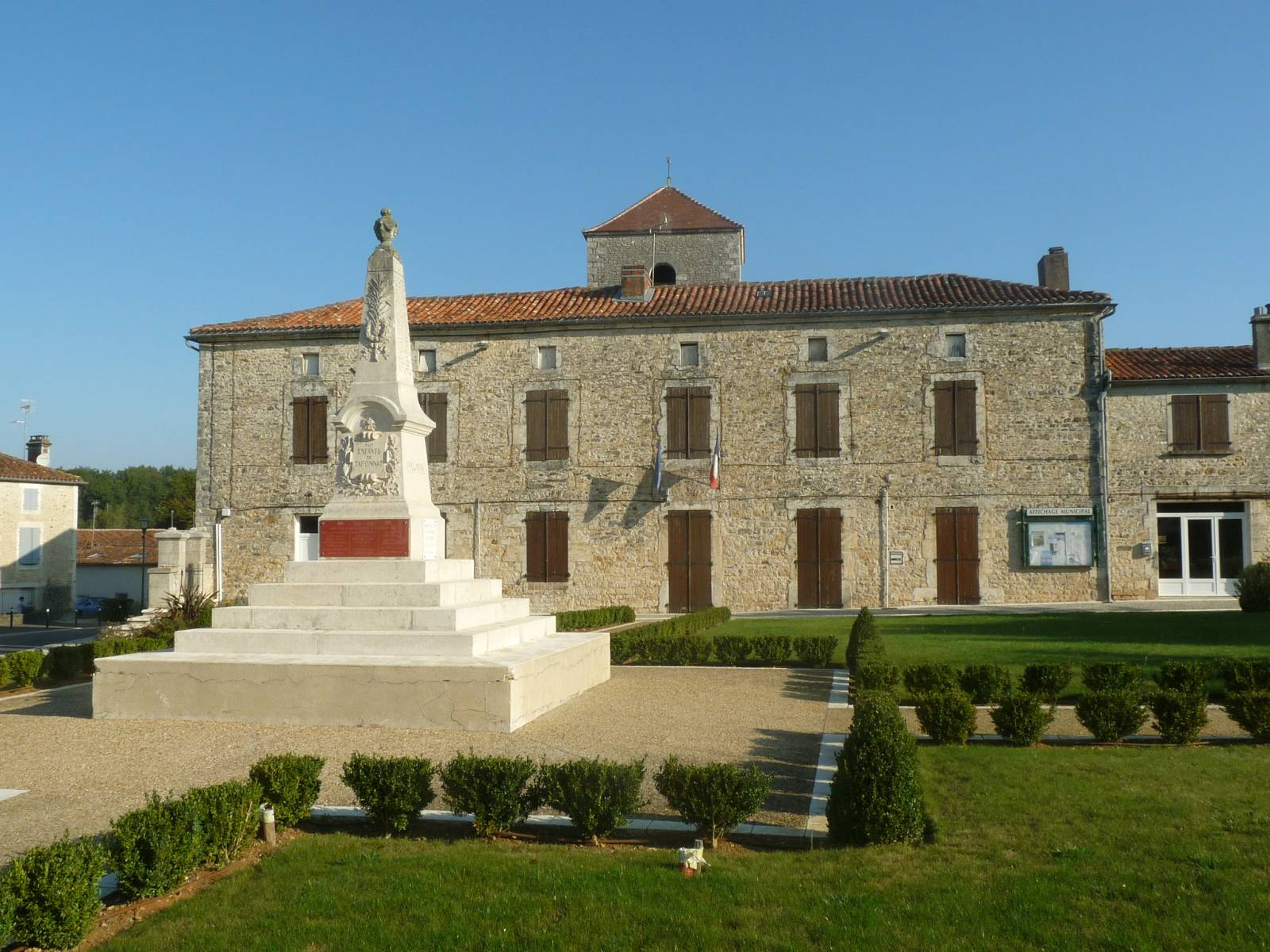
- Town hall
- Location of Taponnat-Fleurignac
- Location within France Location within Nouvelle-Aquitaine
- Coordinates: 45°46′47″N 0°24′35″E
- Country: France
- Region: Nouvelle-Aquitaine
- Department: Charente
- Arrondissement: Angoulême
- Canton: Val de Tardoire

Government
  - Mayor (2020–2026): Serge Jacob-Juin
- Area^{1}: 21.49 km^{2} (8.30 sq mi)
- Elevation: 97 m (318 ft)
- Highest elevation: 158 m (518 ft)
- Lowest elevation: 85 m (279 ft)
- Population (2023): 1,593
  - Density: 74.13/km^{2} (192.0/sq mi)
- Time zone: UTC+01:00 (CET)
  - Summer (DST): UTC+02:00 (CEST)
- INSEE/Postal code: 16379 /16110
- ^{1} French Land Register data, which excludes lakes, ponds, glaciers > 1 km^{2} (0.386 sq mi or 247 acres) and river estuaries.

Taponnat-Fleurignac (French pronunciation: [tapɔna flœʁiɲak]; Occitan: Taponac e Florinhac) is a commune in the Charente department in southwestern France.

== Population ==
Historical population
Year	Pop.	±% p.a.
1968	890	—
1975	1,048	+2.36%
1982	1,055	+0.10%
1990	1,175	+1.36%
1999	1,190	+0.14%
2007	1,427	+2.30%
2012	1,538	+1.51%
2017	1,504	−0.45%
2023	1,593	+0.96%
Source: INSEE

== See also ==
- Communes of the Charente department
