= Orgedeuil =

- Commune
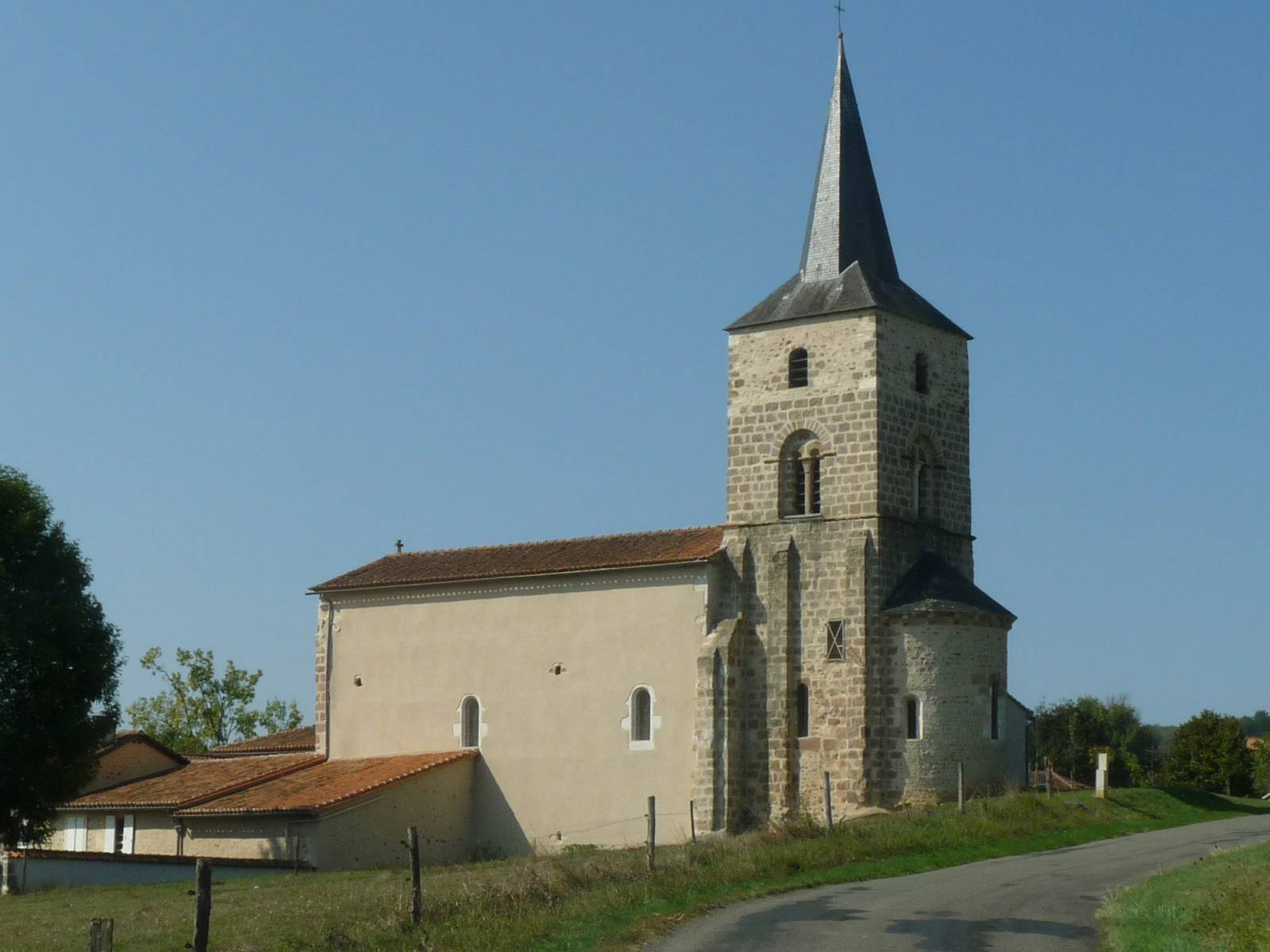
- The church in Orgedeuil
- Location of Orgedeuil
- Location within France Location within Nouvelle-Aquitaine
- Coordinates: 45°41′29″N 0°29′37″E
- Country: France
- Region: Nouvelle-Aquitaine
- Department: Charente
- Arrondissement: Angoulême
- Canton: Val de Tardoire

Government
  - Mayor (2020–2026): Guy Bernard
- Area^{1}: 10.39 km^{2} (4.01 sq mi)
- Elevation: 160 m (520 ft)
- Highest elevation: 322 m (1,056 ft)
- Lowest elevation: 113 m (371 ft)
- Population (2023): 207
  - Density: 19.9/km^{2} (51.6/sq mi)
- Time zone: UTC+01:00 (CET)
  - Summer (DST): UTC+02:00 (CEST)
- INSEE/Postal code: 16250 /16220
- ^{1} French Land Register data, which excludes lakes, ponds, glaciers > 1 km^{2} (0.386 sq mi or 247 acres) and river estuaries.

Orgedeuil (French pronunciation: [ɔʁʒədœj]; Occitan: Orjaduelh) is a commune in the Charente department in southwestern France.

== Population ==
Historical population
Year	Pop.	±% p.a.
1968	244	—
1975	213	−1.92%
1982	207	−0.41%
1990	245	+2.13%
1999	206	−1.91%
2007	218	+0.71%
2012	228	+0.90%
2017	229	+0.09%
2023	207	−1.67%
Source: INSEE

== See also ==
- Communes of the Charente department
