= Bunzac =

- Commune
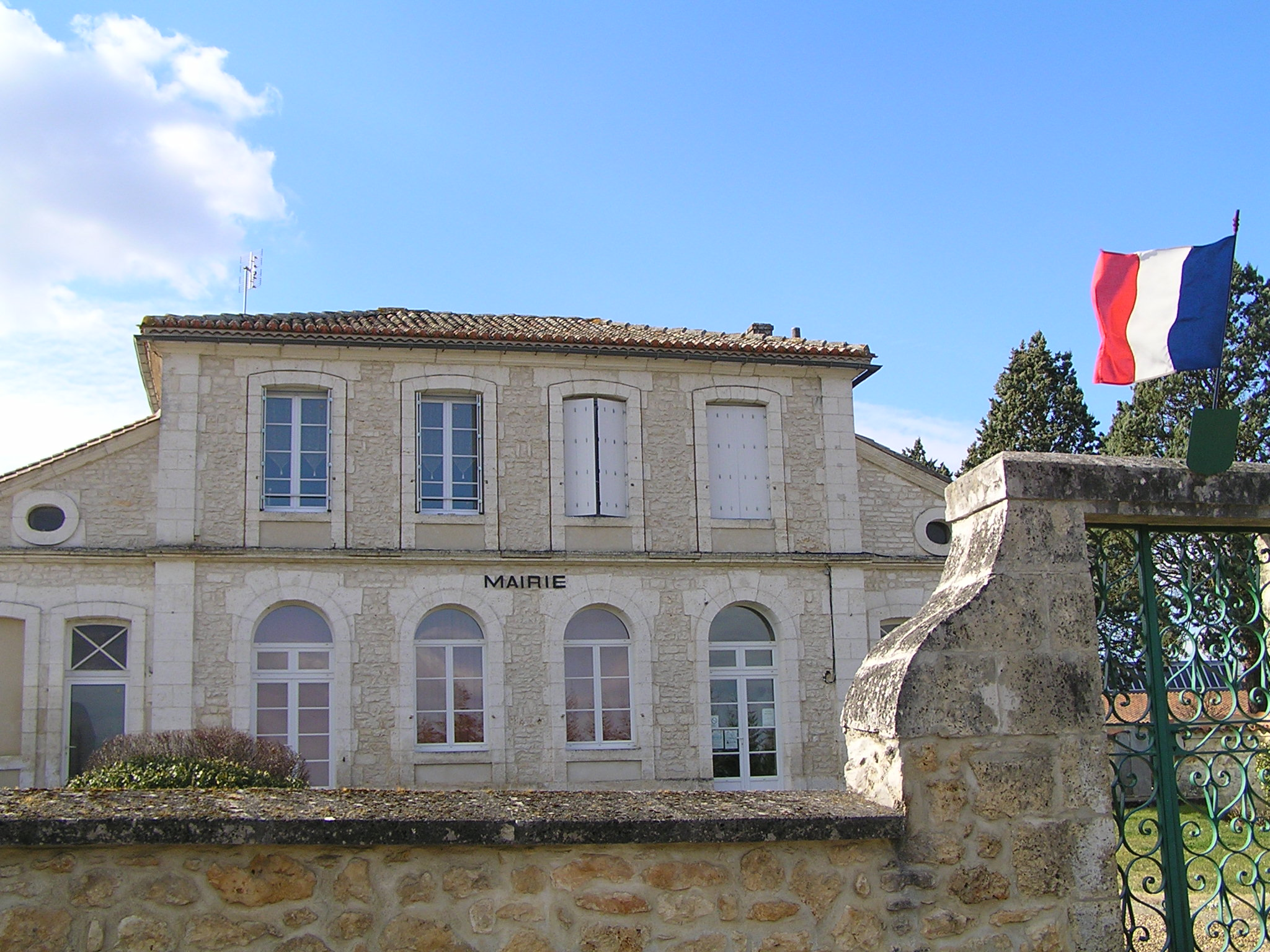
- Town hall
- Location of Bunzac
- Location within France Location within Nouvelle-Aquitaine
- Coordinates: 45°42′06″N 0°21′09″E
- Country: France
- Region: Nouvelle-Aquitaine
- Department: Charente
- Arrondissement: Angoulême
- Canton: Val de Tardoire

Government
  - Mayor (2020–2026): Jean-Pierre Bardoulat
- Area^{1}: 13.32 km^{2} (5.14 sq mi)
- Elevation: 87 m (285 ft)
- Highest elevation: 131 m (430 ft)
- Lowest elevation: 77 m (253 ft)
- Population (2023): 447
  - Density: 33.6/km^{2} (86.9/sq mi)
- Time zone: UTC+01:00 (CET)
  - Summer (DST): UTC+02:00 (CEST)
- INSEE/Postal code: 16067 /16110
- ^{1} French Land Register data, which excludes lakes, ponds, glaciers > 1 km^{2} (0.386 sq mi or 247 acres) and river estuaries.

Bunzac (French pronunciation: [bœ̃zak]) is a commune in the Charente department in southwestern France.

== Population ==
Historical population
Year	Pop.	±% p.a.
1968	348	—
1975	322	−1.10%
1982	314	−0.36%
1990	332	+0.70%
1999	309	−0.79%
2007	426	+4.10%
2012	475	+2.20%
2017	463	−0.51%
2023	447	−0.58%
Source: INSEE

== See also ==
- Communes of the Charente department
