= Canton of Val de Tardoire =

Coordinates: 45.74°N 0.39°E

- Canton
- Situation of the canton of Val de Tardoire in the department of Charente
- Country: France
- Region: Nouvelle-Aquitaine
- Department: Charente
- No. of communes: {{{nbcomm}}}
- Population (2023): 22,022
- INSEE code: 1619

The canton of Val de Tardoire is an administrative division of the Charente department, southwestern France. It was created at the French canton reorganisation which came into effect in March 2015. Its seat is in La Rochefoucauld-en-Angoumois.

It consists of the following communes:

1. Agris
2. Bunzac
3. Charras
4. Chazelles
5. Coulgens
6. Écuras
7. Eymouthiers
8. Feuillade
9. Grassac
10. Mainzac
11. Marillac-le-Franc
12. Marthon
13. Montbron
14. Moulins-sur-Tardoire
15. Orgedeuil
16. Pranzac
17. Rivières
18. La Rochefoucauld-en-Angoumois
19. La Rochette
20. Rouzède
21. Saint-Adjutory
22. Saint-Germain-de-Montbron
23. Saint-Sornin
24. Souffrignac
25. Taponnat-Fleurignac
26. Vouthon
27. Yvrac-et-Malleyrand
