= Yviers =

- Commune
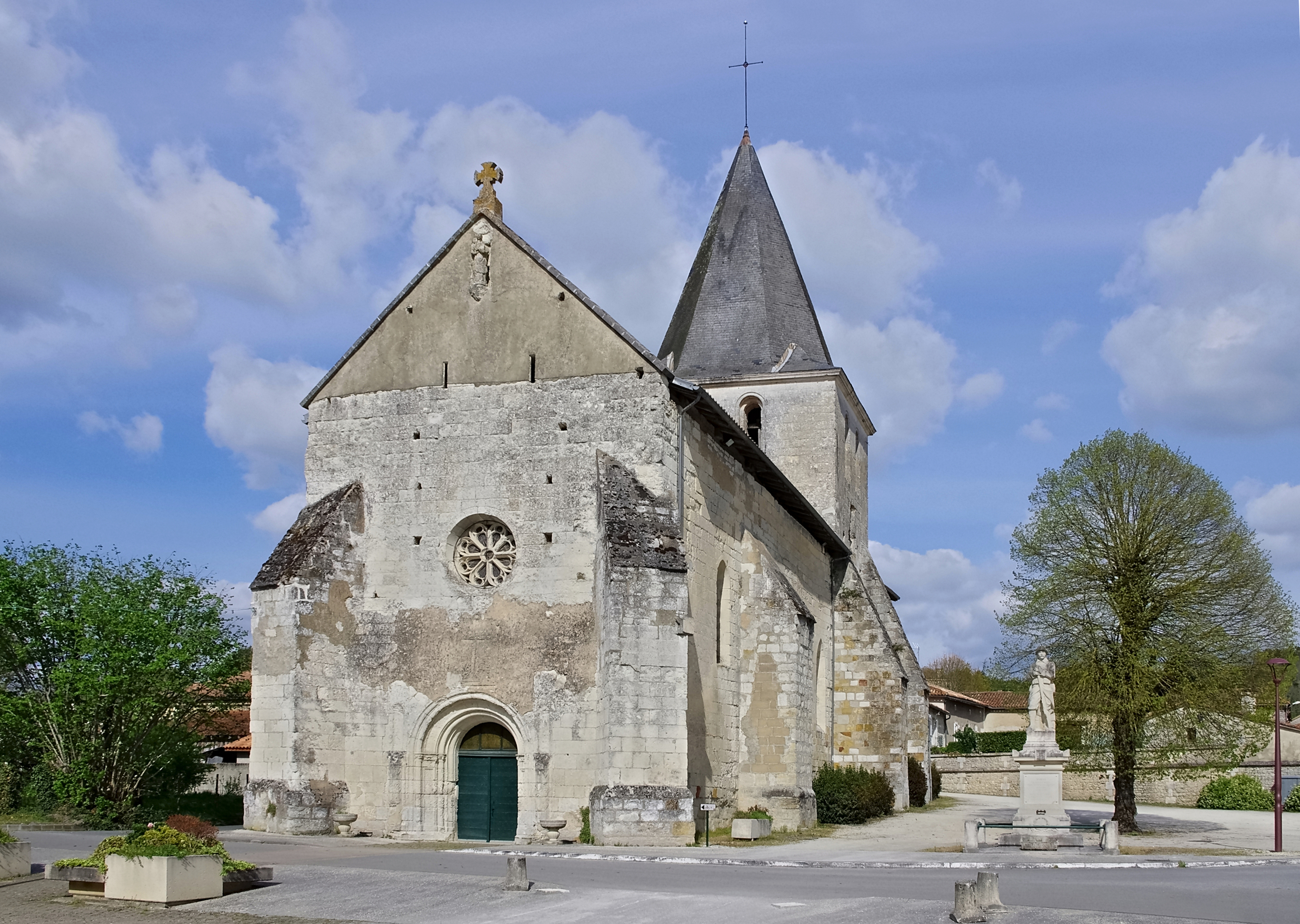
- The church in Yviers
- Location of Yviers
- Location within France Location within Nouvelle-Aquitaine
- Coordinates: 45°16′33″N 0°00′13″W
- Country: France
- Region: Nouvelle-Aquitaine
- Department: Charente
- Arrondissement: Angoulême
- Canton: Tude-et-Lavalette
- Intercommunality: Lavalette Tude Dronne

Government
  - Mayor (2020–2026): Vincent Guglielmini
- Area^{1}: 22.56 km^{2} (8.71 sq mi)
- Elevation: 52 m (171 ft)
- Highest elevation: 147 m (482 ft)
- Lowest elevation: 48 m (157 ft)
- Population (2023): 541
  - Density: 24.0/km^{2} (62.1/sq mi)
- Time zone: UTC+01:00 (CET)
  - Summer (DST): UTC+02:00 (CEST)
- INSEE/Postal code: 16424 /16210
- ^{1} French Land Register data, which excludes lakes, ponds, glaciers > 1 km^{2} (0.386 sq mi or 247 acres) and river estuaries.

Yviers (French pronunciation: [ivje]) is a commune in the Charente department in southwestern France.

== Population ==
Historical population
Year	Pop.	±% p.a.
1968	428	—
1975	415	−0.44%
1982	516	+3.16%
1990	503	−0.32%
1999	468	−0.80%
2007	493	+0.65%
2012	509	+0.64%
2017	510	+0.04%
2023	541	+0.99%
Source: INSEE

== See also ==
- Communes of the Charente department
