= Médillac =

- Commune
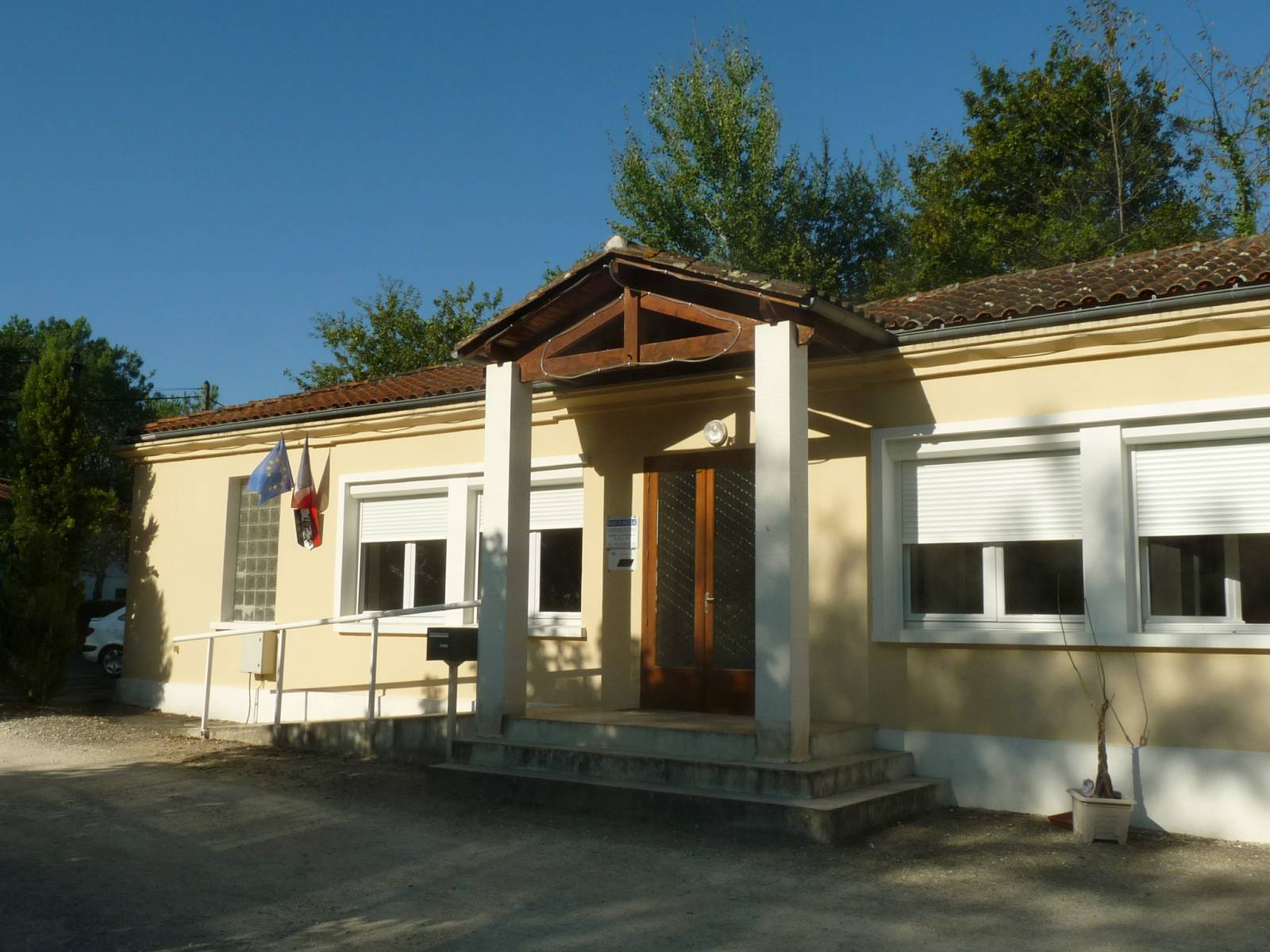
- The town hall in Médillac
- Location of Médillac
- Location within France Location within Nouvelle-Aquitaine
- Coordinates: 45°13′58″N 0°01′36″E
- Country: France
- Region: Nouvelle-Aquitaine
- Department: Charente
- Arrondissement: Angoulême
- Canton: Tude-et-Lavalette

Government
  - Mayor (2020–2026): Joëlle Boizot
- Area^{1}: 5.84 km^{2} (2.25 sq mi)
- Elevation: 90 m (300 ft)
- Highest elevation: 107 m (351 ft)
- Lowest elevation: 22 m (72 ft)
- Population (2023): 150
  - Density: 26/km^{2} (67/sq mi)
- Time zone: UTC+01:00 (CET)
  - Summer (DST): UTC+02:00 (CEST)
- INSEE/Postal code: 16215 /16210
- ^{1} French Land Register data, which excludes lakes, ponds, glaciers > 1 km^{2} (0.386 sq mi or 247 acres) and river estuaries.

Médillac (French pronunciation: [medijak]) is a commune in the Charente department in southwestern France.

== Population ==
Historical population
Year	Pop.	±% p.a.
1968	234	—
1975	209	−1.60%
1982	204	−0.35%
1990	177	−1.76%
1999	168	−0.58%
2007	156	−0.92%
2012	156	+0.00%
2017	158	+0.26%
2023	150	−0.86%
Source: INSEE

== See also ==
- Communes of the Charente department
