= Saint-Adjutory =

- Commune
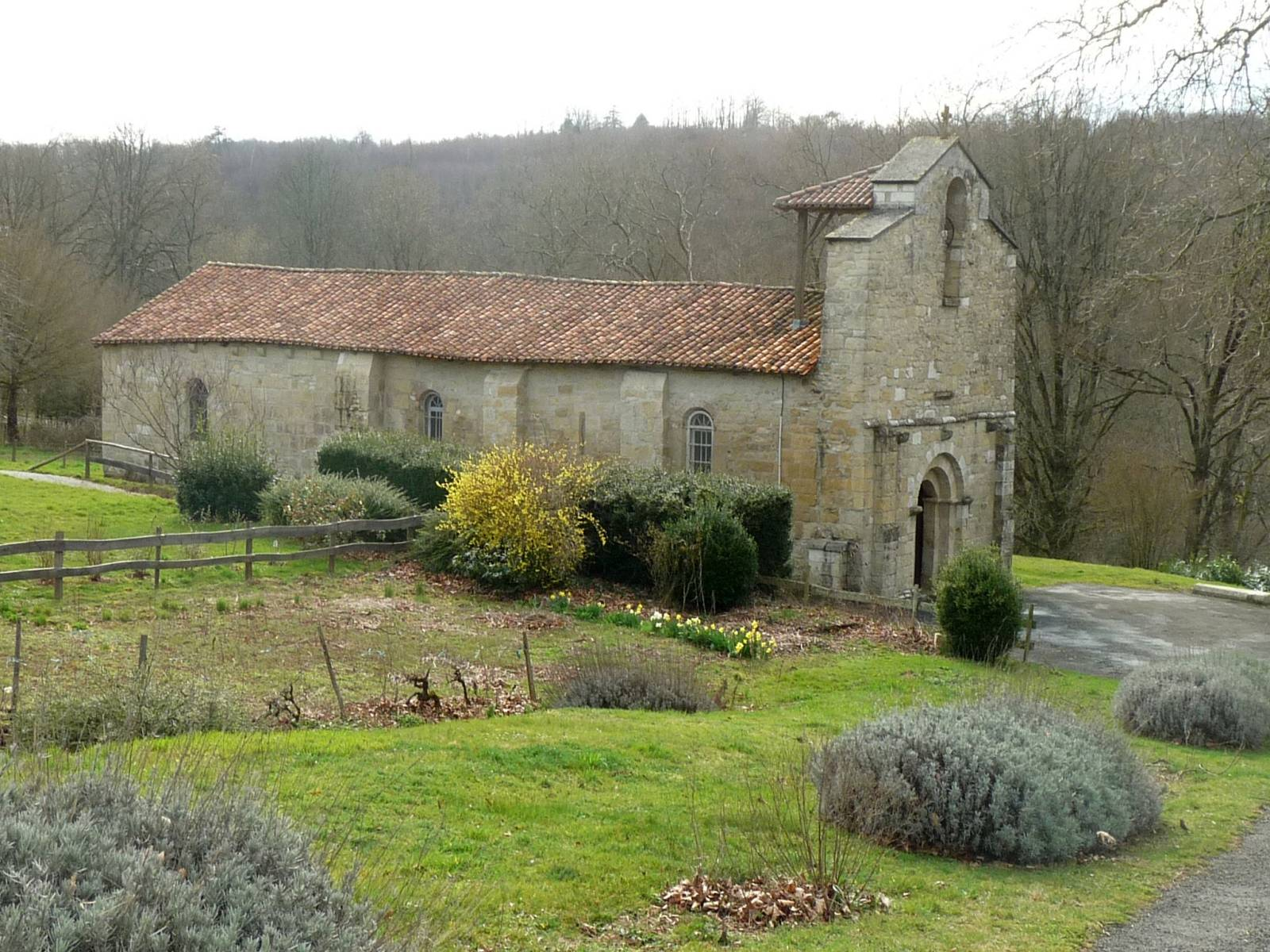
- The church in Saint-Adjutory
- Location of Saint-Adjutory
- Location within France Location within Nouvelle-Aquitaine
- Coordinates: 45°45′57″N 0°28′32″E
- Country: France
- Region: Nouvelle-Aquitaine
- Department: Charente
- Arrondissement: Angoulême
- Canton: Val de Tardoire
- Intercommunality: La Rochefoucauld - Porte du Périgord

Government
  - Mayor (2020–2026): Patrice Boutenègre
- Area^{1}: 14.04 km^{2} (5.42 sq mi)
- Elevation: 226 m (741 ft)
- Highest elevation: 293 m (961 ft)
- Lowest elevation: 119 m (390 ft)
- Population (2023): 503
  - Density: 35.8/km^{2} (92.8/sq mi)
- Time zone: UTC+01:00 (CET)
  - Summer (DST): UTC+02:00 (CEST)
- INSEE/Postal code: 16293 /16310
- ^{1} French Land Register data, which excludes lakes, ponds, glaciers > 1 km^{2} (0.386 sq mi or 247 acres) and river estuaries.

Saint-Adjutory (French pronunciation: [sɛ̃.t‿adʒytɔʁi]; Occitan: Sent Aitòre) is a commune in the Charente department in southwestern France.

== Population ==
Historical population
Year	Pop.	±% p.a.
1968	418	—
1975	388	−1.06%
1982	361	−1.03%
1990	334	−0.97%
1999	349	+0.49%
2007	338	−0.40%
2012	439	+5.37%
2017	481	+1.84%
2023	503	+0.75%
Source: INSEE

== See also ==
- Communes of the Charente department
