= Vouthon =

- Commune
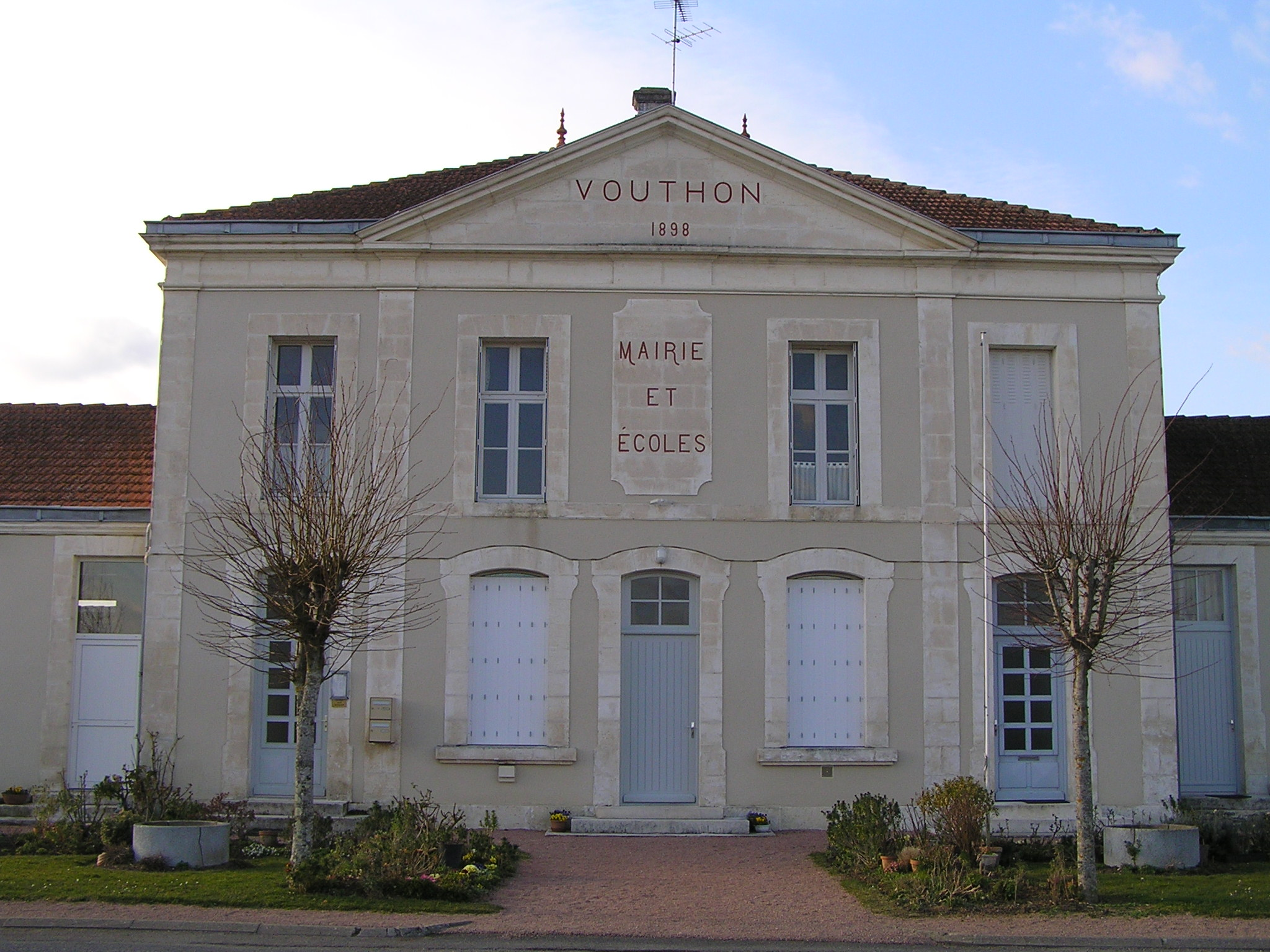
- Town hall
- Location of Vouthon
- Location within France Location within Nouvelle-Aquitaine
- Coordinates: 45°40′13″N 0°27′43″E
- Country: France
- Region: Nouvelle-Aquitaine
- Department: Charente
- Arrondissement: Angoulême
- Canton: Val de Tardoire
- Intercommunality: La Rochefoucauld-Porte du Périgord

Government
  - Mayor (2020–2026): Laurent Mandin
- Area^{1}: 10.38 km^{2} (4.01 sq mi)
- Highest elevation: 172 m (564 ft)
- Lowest elevation: 93 m (305 ft)
- Population (2023): 405
  - Density: 39.0/km^{2} (101/sq mi)
- Time zone: UTC+01:00 (CET)
  - Summer (DST): UTC+02:00 (CEST)
- INSEE/Postal code: 16421 /16220
- ^{1} French Land Register data, which excludes lakes, ponds, glaciers > 1 km^{2} (0.386 sq mi or 247 acres) and river estuaries.

Vouthon (French pronunciation: [vutɔ̃]; Occitan: Volton) is a commune in the Charente department in southwestern France.

== Population ==
Historical population
Year	Pop.	±% p.a.
1968	307	—
1975	302	−0.23%
1982	322	+0.92%
1990	351	+1.08%
1999	327	−0.78%
2007	343	+0.60%
2012	405	+3.38%
2017	419	+0.68%
2023	405	−0.56%
Source: INSEE

== See also ==
- Communes of the Charente department
