= Bardenac =

- Commune
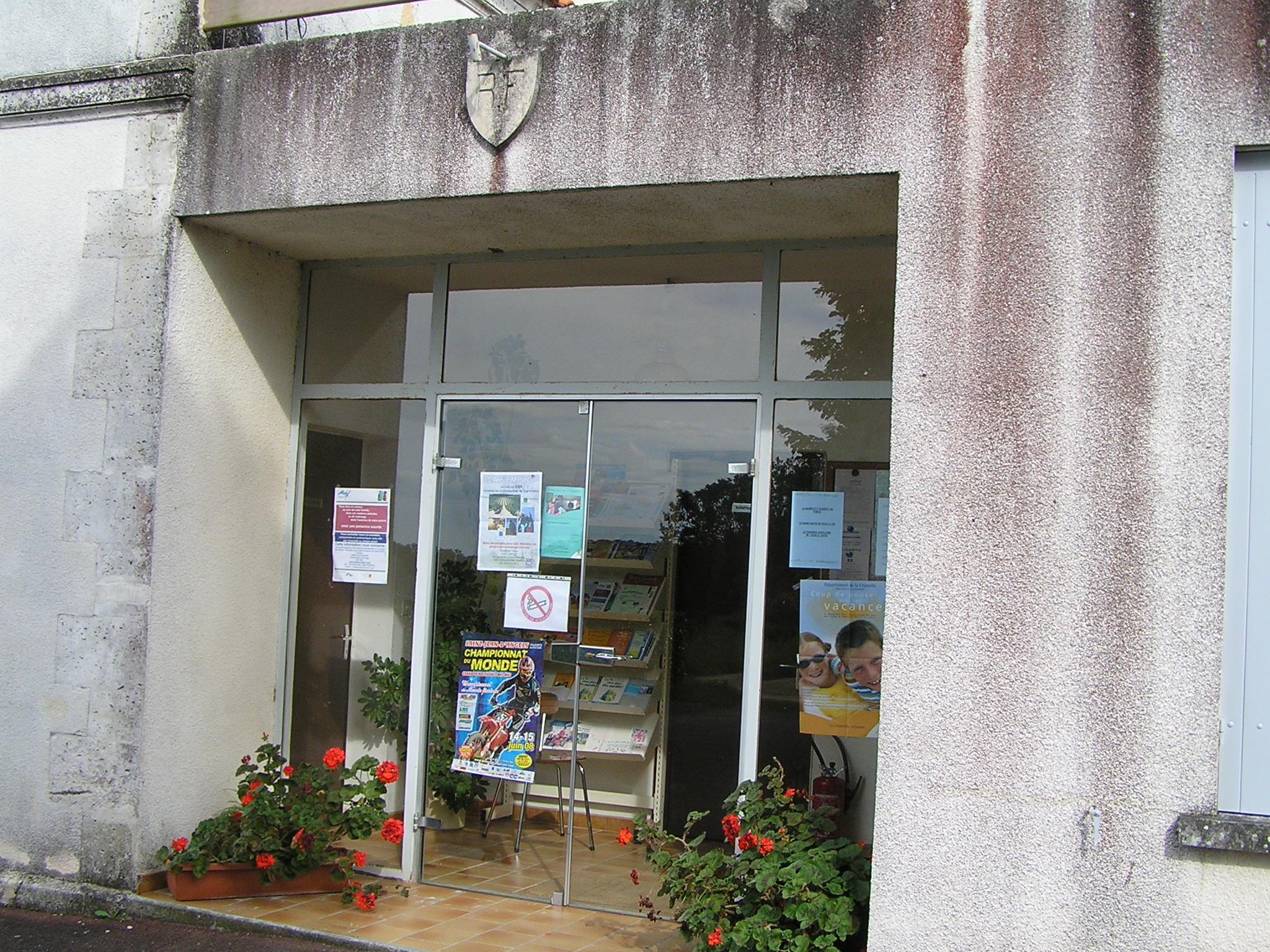
- Town hall
- Location of Bardenac
- Location within France Location within Nouvelle-Aquitaine
- Coordinates: 45°18′06″N 0°00′49″W
- Country: France
- Region: Nouvelle-Aquitaine
- Department: Charente
- Arrondissement: Angoulême
- Canton: Tude-et-Lavalette
- Intercommunality: Lavalette Tude Dronne

Government
  - Mayor (2020–2026): Dany Poirier
- Area^{1}: 8.04 km^{2} (3.10 sq mi)
- Elevation: 95 m (312 ft)
- Highest elevation: 160 m (520 ft)
- Lowest elevation: 61 m (200 ft)
- Population (2023): 214
  - Density: 26.6/km^{2} (68.9/sq mi)
- Time zone: UTC+01:00 (CET)
  - Summer (DST): UTC+02:00 (CEST)
- INSEE/Postal code: 16029 /16210
- ^{1} French Land Register data, which excludes lakes, ponds, glaciers > 1 km^{2} (0.386 sq mi or 247 acres) and river estuaries.

Bardenac (French pronunciation: [baʁdənak]) is a commune in the Charente department in southwestern France.

== Population ==
Historical population
Year	Pop.	±% p.a.
1968	232	—
1975	220	−0.76%
1982	195	−1.71%
1990	207	+0.75%
1999	238	+1.56%
2007	239	+0.05%
2012	258	+1.54%
2017	228	−2.44%
2023	214	−1.05%
Source: INSEE

== See also ==
- Communes of the Charente department
