= Écuras =

- Commune
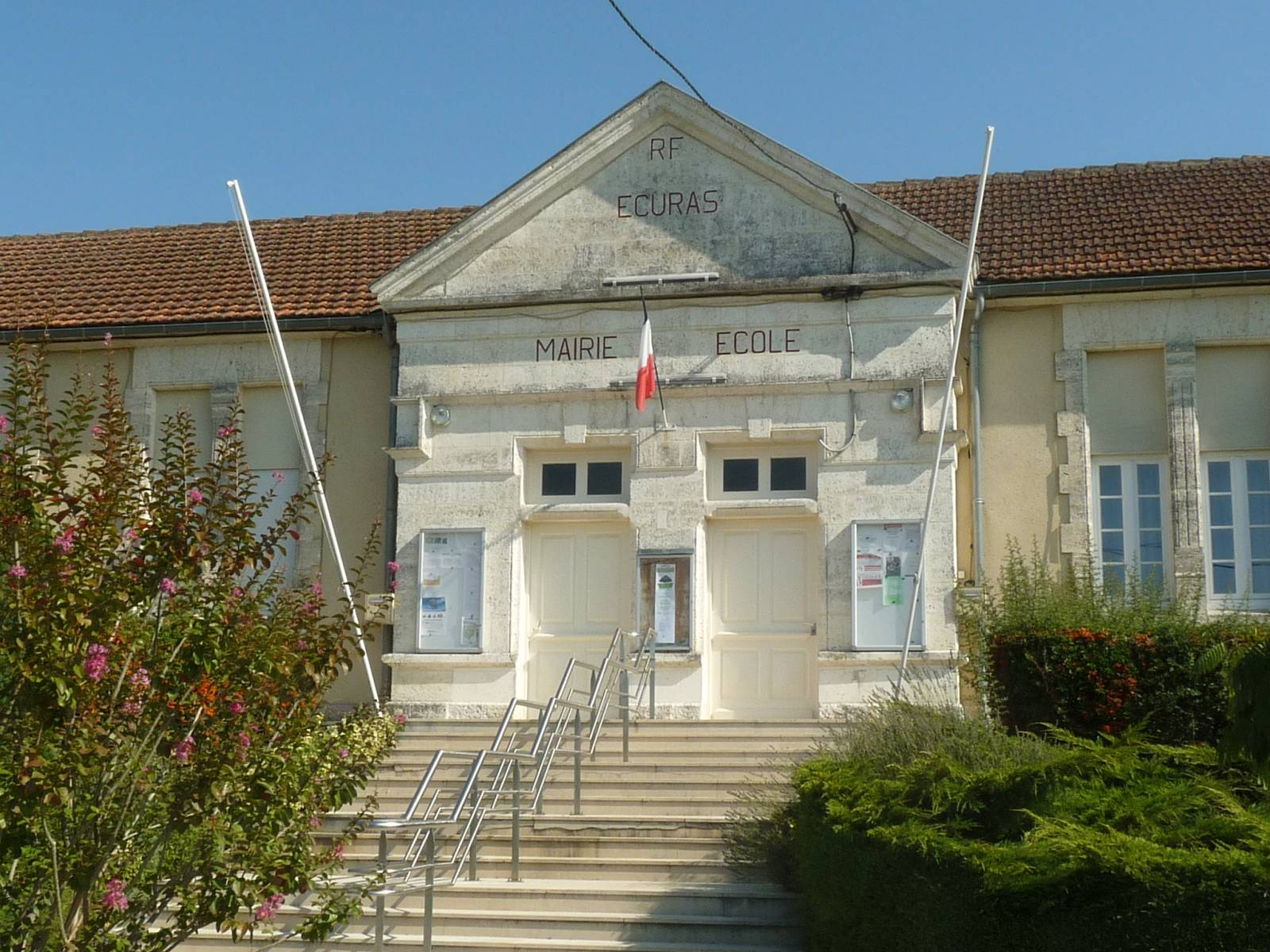
- Town hall
- Location of Écuras
- Location within France Location within Nouvelle-Aquitaine
- Coordinates: 45°41′04″N 0°34′05″E
- Country: France
- Region: Nouvelle-Aquitaine
- Department: Charente
- Arrondissement: Angoulême
- Canton: Val de Tardoire

Government
  - Mayor (2020–2026): Denis Donnary
- Area^{1}: 24.22 km^{2} (9.35 sq mi)
- Elevation: 218 m (715 ft)
- Highest elevation: 280 m (920 ft)
- Lowest elevation: 111 m (364 ft)
- Population (2023): 579
  - Density: 23.9/km^{2} (61.9/sq mi)
- Time zone: UTC+01:00 (CET)
  - Summer (DST): UTC+02:00 (CEST)
- INSEE/Postal code: 16124 /16220
- ^{1} French Land Register data, which excludes lakes, ponds, glaciers > 1 km^{2} (0.386 sq mi or 247 acres) and river estuaries.

Écuras is a commune in the Charente department in southwestern France.

== Population ==
Historical population
Year	Pop.	±% p.a.
1968	776	—
1975	686	−1.75%
1982	634	−1.12%
1990	628	−0.12%
1999	557	−1.32%
2007	644	+1.83%
2012	607	−1.18%
2017	582	−0.84%
2023	579	−0.09%
Source: INSEE

== See also ==
- Communes of the Charente department
