= Rouzède =

- Commune
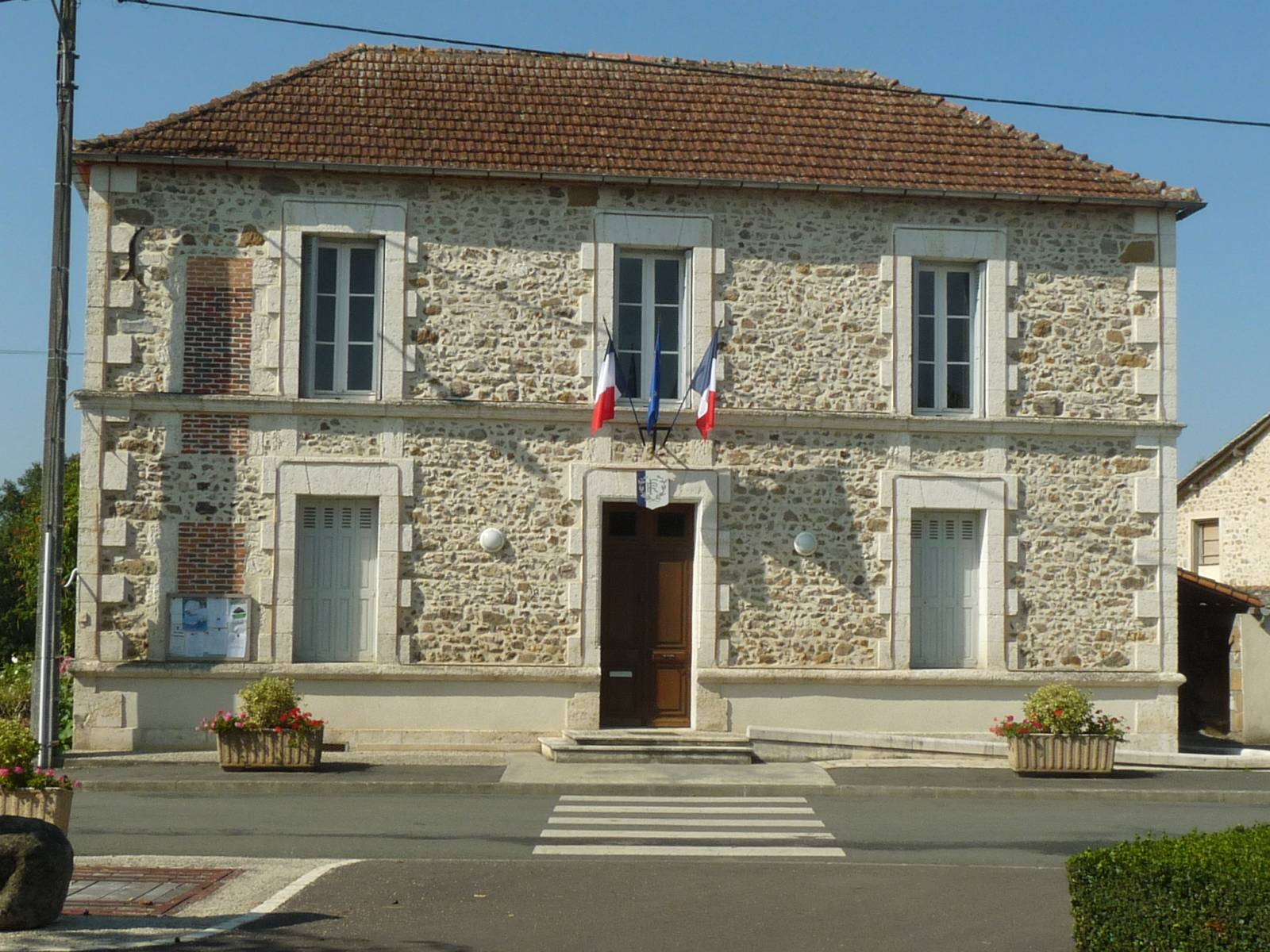
- The town hall in Rouzède
- Location of Rouzède
- Location within France Location within Nouvelle-Aquitaine
- Coordinates: 45°42′33″N 0°33′18″E
- Country: France
- Region: Nouvelle-Aquitaine
- Department: Charente
- Arrondissement: Angoulême
- Canton: Val de Tardoire
- Intercommunality: La Rochefoucauld - Porte du Périgord

Government
  - Mayor (2020–2026): Anne Bernard
- Area^{1}: 14.33 km^{2} (5.53 sq mi)
- Elevation: 232 m (761 ft)
- Highest elevation: 351 m (1,152 ft)
- Lowest elevation: 148 m (486 ft)
- Population (2023): 231
  - Density: 16.1/km^{2} (41.8/sq mi)
- Time zone: UTC+01:00 (CET)
  - Summer (DST): UTC+02:00 (CEST)
- INSEE/Postal code: 16290 /16220
- ^{1} French Land Register data, which excludes lakes, ponds, glaciers > 1 km^{2} (0.386 sq mi or 247 acres) and river estuaries.

Rouzède (French pronunciation: [ʁuzɛd]; Occitan: Rauseda) is a commune in the Charente department in southwestern France.

== Population ==
Historical population
Year	Pop.	±% p.a.
1968	353	—
1975	302	−2.20%
1982	249	−2.72%
1990	234	−0.77%
1999	267	+1.48%
2007	254	−0.62%
2012	228	−2.14%
2017	241	+1.12%
2023	231	−0.70%
Source: INSEE

== See also ==
- Communes of the Charente department
