= Yvrac-et-Malleyrand =

- Commune
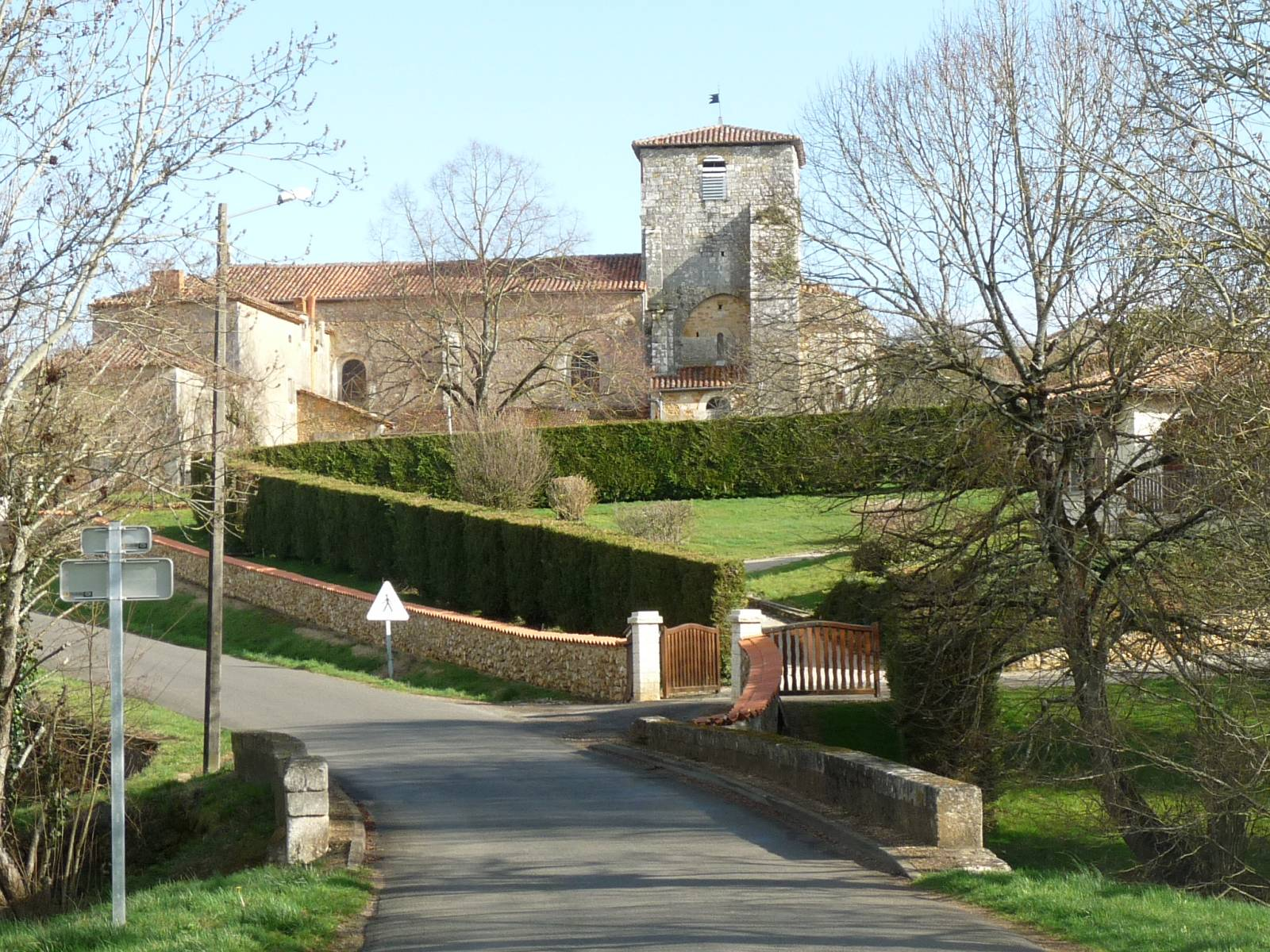
- Church
- Location of Yvrac-et-Malleyrand
- Location within France Location within Nouvelle-Aquitaine
- Coordinates: 45°45′03″N 0°26′55″E
- Country: France
- Region: Nouvelle-Aquitaine
- Department: Charente
- Arrondissement: Angoulême
- Canton: Val de Tardoire
- Intercommunality: La Rochefoucauld-Porte du Périgord

Government
  - Mayor (2020–2026): Emmanuel Jouassin
- Area^{1}: 18.90 km^{2} (7.30 sq mi)
- Elevation: 210 m (690 ft)
- Highest elevation: 315 m (1,033 ft)
- Lowest elevation: 109 m (358 ft)
- Population (2023): 559
  - Density: 29.6/km^{2} (76.6/sq mi)
- Demonym(s): Yvracois, Yvracoises
- Time zone: UTC+01:00 (CET)
  - Summer (DST): UTC+02:00 (CEST)
- INSEE/Postal code: 16425 /16110
- ^{1} French Land Register data, which excludes lakes, ponds, glaciers > 1 km^{2} (0.386 sq mi or 247 acres) and river estuaries.

Yvrac-et-Malleyrand (French pronunciation: [ivʁak e malɛʁɑ̃]; Occitan: Ivrac e Maleirand) is a commune in the Charente department in southwestern France.

== Population ==
Historical population

Year	Pop.	±% p.a.
1793	900	—
1821	1,039	+0.51%
1846	1,067	+0.11%
1872	875	−0.76%
1901	775	−0.42%
1926	682	−0.51%
1946	602	−0.62%
1962	506	−1.08%
1968	481	−0.84%

Year	Pop.	±% p.a.
1975	420	−1.92%
1982	403	−0.59%
1990	432	+0.87%
1999	465	+0.82%
2007	522	+1.46%
2012	521	−0.04%
2017	547	+0.98%
2023	559	+0.36%

Source: EHESS (1793-1999) and INSEE

== See also ==
- Communes of the Charente department
