= Bazac =

- Commune
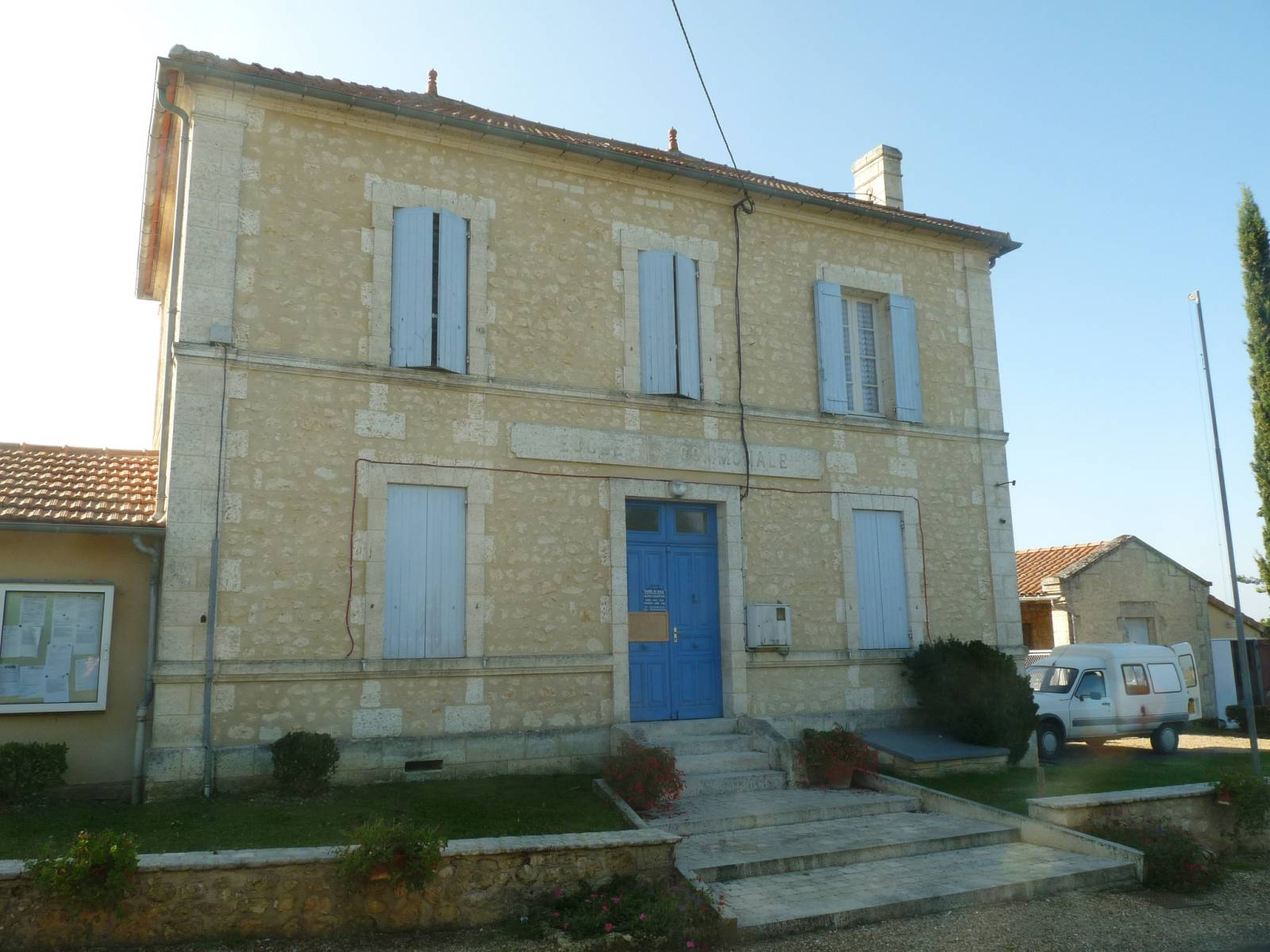
- Town hall

- Coat of arms
- Location of Bazac
- Location within France Location within Nouvelle-Aquitaine
- Coordinates: 45°13′55″N 0°03′01″E
- Country: France
- Region: Nouvelle-Aquitaine
- Department: Charente
- Arrondissement: Angoulême
- Canton: Tude-et-Lavalette

Government
  - Mayor (2020–2026): Philippe Pellissier
- Area^{1}: 4.92 km^{2} (1.90 sq mi)
- Elevation: 75 m (246 ft)
- Highest elevation: 121 m (397 ft)
- Lowest elevation: 25 m (82 ft)
- Population (2023): 150
  - Density: 30/km^{2} (79/sq mi)
- Time zone: UTC+01:00 (CET)
  - Summer (DST): UTC+02:00 (CEST)
- INSEE/Postal code: 16034 /16210
- ^{1} French Land Register data, which excludes lakes, ponds, glaciers > 1 km^{2} (0.386 sq mi or 247 acres) and river estuaries.

Bazac (French pronunciation: [bazak]) is a commune in the Charente department in southwestern France.

== Population ==
Historical population
Year	Pop.	±% p.a.
1968	260	—
1975	233	−1.55%
1982	158	−5.40%
1990	159	+0.08%
1999	150	−0.65%
2007	177	+2.09%
2012	160	−2.00%
2017	143	−2.22%
2023	150	+0.80%
Source: INSEE

== See also ==
- Communes of the Charente department
