= Montboyer =

- Commune
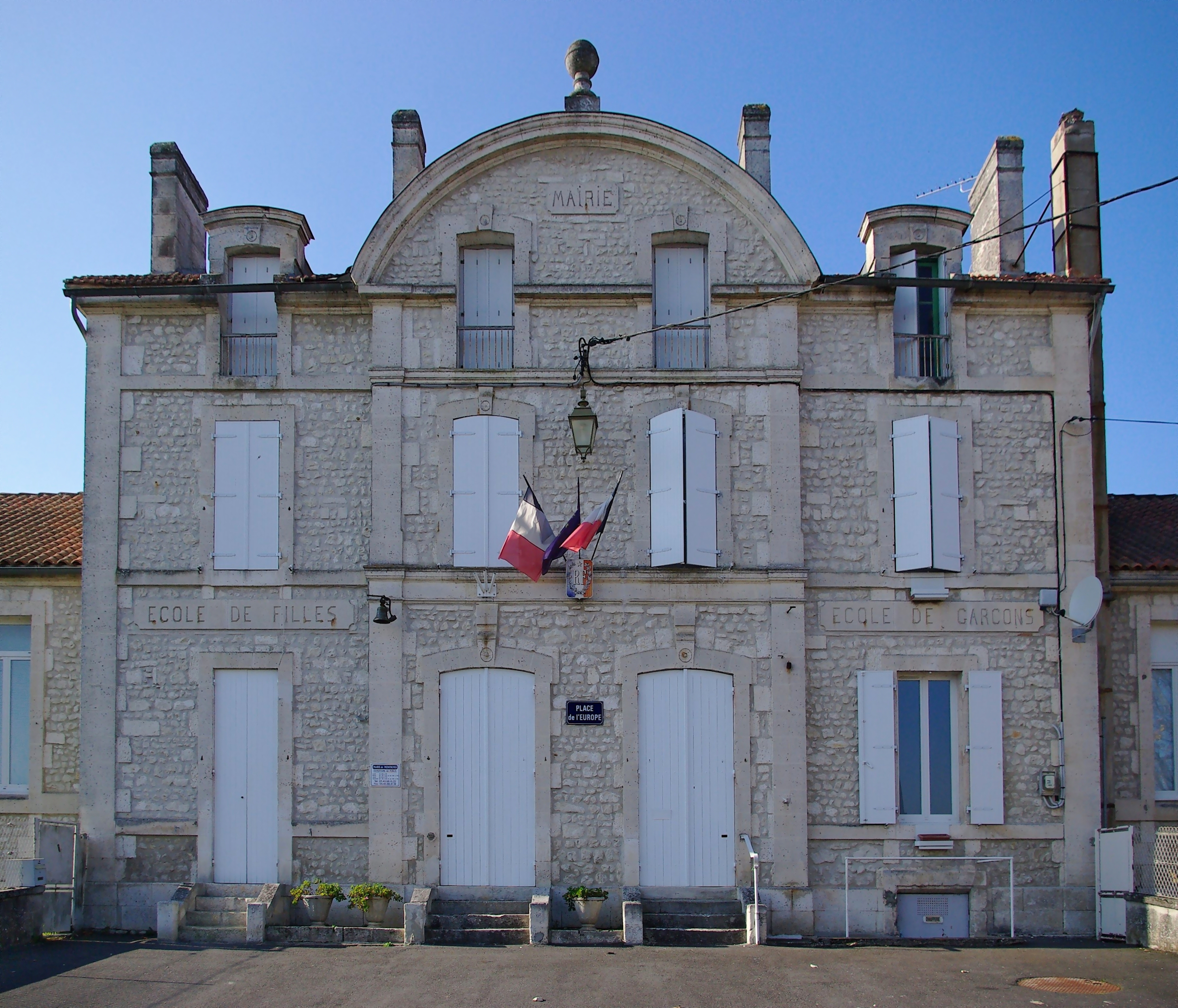
- The town hall and school in Montboyer
- Location of Montboyer
- Location within France Location within Nouvelle-Aquitaine
- Coordinates: 45°19′33″N 0°04′32″E
- Country: France
- Region: Nouvelle-Aquitaine
- Department: Charente
- Arrondissement: Angoulême
- Canton: Tude-et-Lavalette

Government
  - Mayor (2020–2026): Muriel Enique
- Area^{1}: 26.79 km^{2} (10.34 sq mi)
- Elevation: 65 m (213 ft)
- Highest elevation: 171 m (561 ft)
- Lowest elevation: 47 m (154 ft)
- Population (2023): 341
  - Density: 12.7/km^{2} (33.0/sq mi)
- Time zone: UTC+01:00 (CET)
  - Summer (DST): UTC+02:00 (CEST)
- INSEE/Postal code: 16222 /16620
- ^{1} French Land Register data, which excludes lakes, ponds, glaciers > 1 km^{2} (0.386 sq mi or 247 acres) and river estuaries.

Montboyer (French pronunciation: [mɔ̃bwaje]) is a commune in the Charente department in southwestern France.

== Population ==
Historical population
Year	Pop.	±% p.a.
1968	595	—
1975	538	−1.43%
1982	489	−1.35%
1990	440	−1.31%
1999	415	−0.65%
2007	411	−0.12%
2012	395	−0.79%
2017	350	−2.39%
2023	341	−0.43%
Source: INSEE

== See also ==
- Communes of the Charente department
