= Arrondissement of Angoulême =

Coordinates: 45.65°N 0.15°E

Angoulême
- Arrondissement
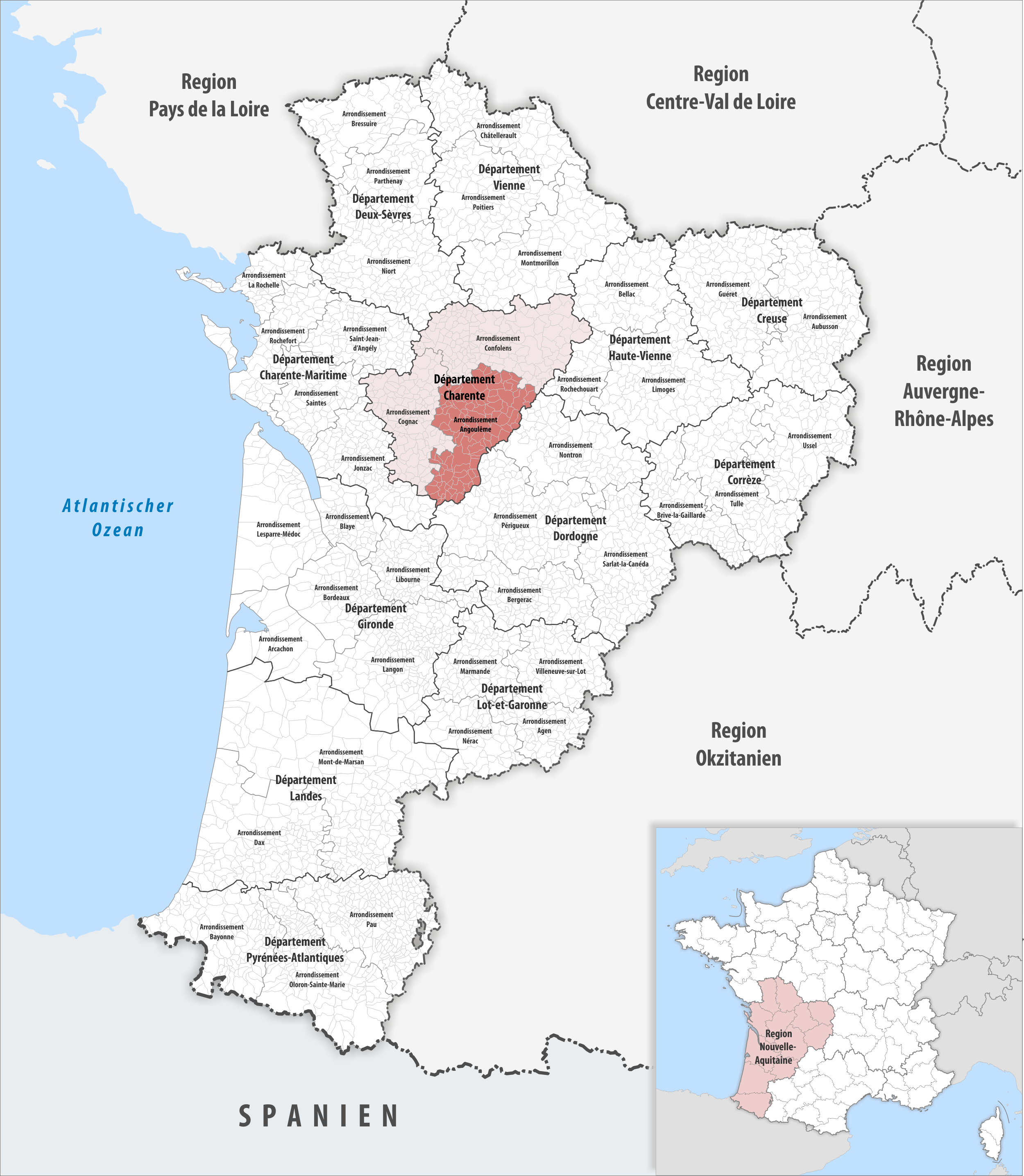
- Location within the region Nouvelle-Aquitaine
- Country: France
- Region: Nouvelle-Aquitaine
- Department: Charente
- No. of communes: {{{nbcomm}}}
- Area: 1,867.6 km^{2} (721.1 sq mi)
- Population (2023): 182,424
  - Density: 97.678/km^{2} (252.99/sq mi)
- INSEE code: 161

The arrondissement of Angoulême is an arrondissement of France in the Charente department in the Nouvelle-Aquitaine region. It has 114 communes. Its population is 181,315 (2021), and its area is 1,867.6 km^{2} (721.1 sq mi).

== Composition ==
The communes of the arrondissement of Angoulême, and their INSEE codes, are:

1. Agris (16003)
2. Angoulême (16015)
3. Asnières-sur-Nouère (16019)
4. Aubeterre-sur-Dronne (16020)
5. Balzac (16026)
6. Bardenac (16029)
7. Bazac (16034)
8. Bellon (16037)
9. Bessac (16041)
10. Blanzaguet-Saint-Cybard (16047)
11. Boisné-la-Tude (16082)
12. Bonnes (16049)
13. Bors-de-Montmoreau (16052)
14. Bouëx (16055)
15. Brie (16061)
16. Brie-sous-Chalais (16063)
17. Bunzac (16067)
18. Chadurie (16072)
19. Chalais (16073)
20. Champniers (16078)
21. Charras (16084)
22. Châtignac (16091)
23. Chazelles (16093)
24. Claix (16101)
25. Combiers (16103)
26. Coulgens (16107)
27. Courgeac (16111)
28. Courlac (16112)
29. La Couronne (16113)
30. Curac (16117)
31. Deviat (16118)
32. Dignac (16119)
33. Dirac (16120)
34. Écuras (16124)
35. Édon (16125)
36. Les Essards (16130)
37. Eymouthiers (16135)
38. Feuillade (16137)
39. Fléac (16138)
40. Fouquebrune (16143)
41. Garat (16146)
42. Gond-Pontouvre (16154)
43. Grassac (16158)
44. Gurat (16162)
45. L'Isle-d'Espagnac (16166)
46. Jauldes (16168)
47. Juignac (16170)
48. Laprade (16180)
49. Linars (16187)
50. Magnac-lès-Gardes (16198)
51. Magnac-sur-Touvre (16199)
52. Mainzac (16203)
53. Marillac-le-Franc (16209)
54. Marsac (16210)
55. Marthon (16211)
56. Médillac (16215)
57. Montboyer (16222)
58. Montbron (16223)
59. Montignac-le-Coq (16227)
60. Montmoreau (16230)
61. Mornac (16232)
62. Moulins-sur-Tardoire (16406)
63. Mouthiers-sur-Boëme (16236)
64. Nabinaud (16240)
65. Nersac (16244)
66. Nonac (16246)
67. Orgedeuil (16250)
68. Orival (16252)
69. Palluaud (16254)
70. Pillac (16260)
71. Plassac-Rouffiac (16263)
72. Poullignac (16267)
73. Pranzac (16269)
74. Puymoyen (16271)
75. Rioux-Martin (16279)
76. Rivières (16280)
77. La Rochefoucauld-en-Angoumois (16281)
78. La Rochette (16282)
79. Ronsenac (16283)
80. Rouffiac (16284)
81. Rougnac (16285)
82. Roullet-Saint-Estèphe (16287)
83. Rouzède (16290)
84. Ruelle-sur-Touvre (16291)
85. Saint-Adjutory (16293)
86. Saint-Avit (16302)
87. Saint-Germain-de-Montbron (16323)
88. Saint-Laurent-des-Combes (16331)
89. Saint-Martial (16334)
90. Saint-Michel (16341)
91. Saint-Quentin-de-Chalais (16346)
92. Saint-Romain (16347)
93. Saint-Saturnin (16348)
94. Saint-Séverin (16350)
95. Saint-Sornin (16353)
96. Saint-Yrieix-sur-Charente (16358)
97. Salles-Lavalette (16362)
98. Sers (16368)
99. Sireuil (16370)
100. Souffrignac (16372)
101. Soyaux (16374)
102. Taponnat-Fleurignac (16379)
103. Torsac (16382)
104. Touvre (16385)
105. Trois-Palis (16388)
106. Vaux-Lavalette (16394)
107. Villebois-Lavalette (16408)
108. Vindelle (16415)
109. Vœuil-et-Giget (16418)
110. Voulgézac (16420)
111. Vouthon (16421)
112. Vouzan (16422)
113. Yviers (16424)
114. Yvrac-et-Malleyrand (16425)

== History ==
The arrondissement of Angoulême was created in 1800. On 1 January 2008 the four cantons of Aigre, Mansle, Ruffec and Villefagnan that previously belonged to the arrondissement of Angoulême were added to the arrondissement of Confolens, and the canton of Rouillac to the arrondissement of Cognac. At the January 2017 reorganisation of the arrondissements of Charente, it lost 14 communes to the arrondissement of Cognac and 15 communes to the arrondissement of Confolens, and it gained two communes from the arrondissement of Cognac.

As a result of the reorganisation of the cantons of France which came into effect in 2015, the borders of the cantons are no longer related to the borders of the arrondissements. The cantons of the arrondissement of Angoulême were, as of January 2015:

1. Angoulême-Est
2. Angoulême-Nord
3. Angoulême-Ouest
4. Aubeterre-sur-Dronne
5. Blanzac-Porcheresse
6. Chalais
7. La Couronne
8. Gond-Pontouvre
9. Hiersac
10. Montbron
11. Montmoreau-Saint-Cybard
12. La Rochefoucauld
13. Ruelle-sur-Touvre
14. Saint-Amant-de-Boixe
15. Soyaux
16. Villebois-Lavalette
