= Marillac-le-Franc =

- Commune
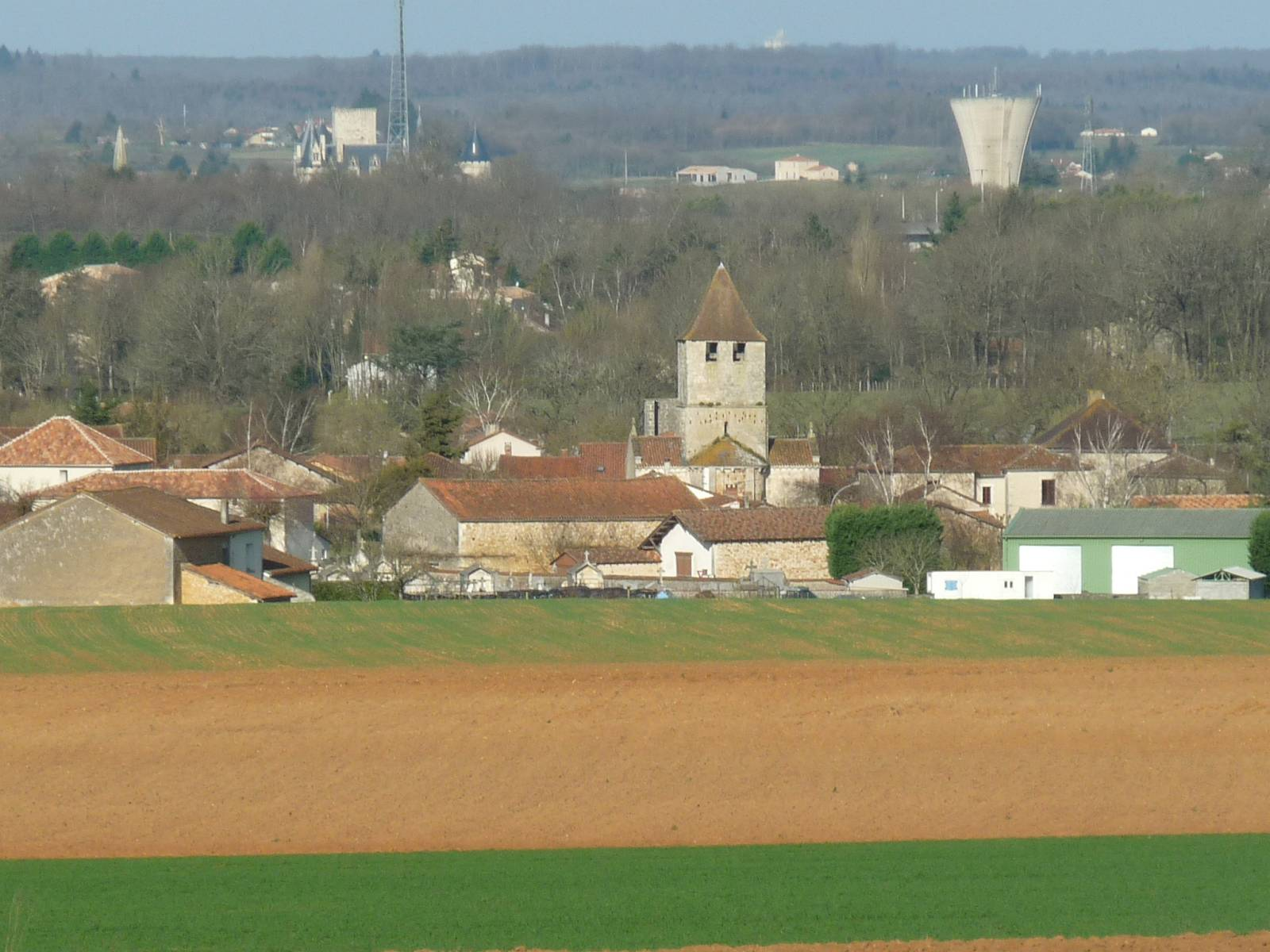
- A general view of Marillac-le-Franc
- Location of Marillac-le-Franc
- Location within France Location within Nouvelle-Aquitaine
- Coordinates: 45°44′10″N 0°25′50″E
- Country: France
- Region: Nouvelle-Aquitaine
- Department: Charente
- Arrondissement: Angoulême
- Canton: Val de Tardoire
- Intercommunality: La Rochefoucauld - Porte du Périgord

Government
  - Mayor (2020–2026): Pierre Bardoulat
- Area^{1}: 14.49 km^{2} (5.59 sq mi)
- Elevation: 100 m (330 ft)
- Highest elevation: 203 m (666 ft)
- Lowest elevation: 84 m (276 ft)
- Population (2023): 825
  - Density: 56.9/km^{2} (147/sq mi)
- Time zone: UTC+01:00 (CET)
  - Summer (DST): UTC+02:00 (CEST)
- INSEE/Postal code: 16209 /16110
- ^{1} French Land Register data, which excludes lakes, ponds, glaciers > 1 km^{2} (0.386 sq mi or 247 acres) and river estuaries.

Marillac-le-Franc (French pronunciation: [maʁijak lə fʁɑ̃]; Occitan: Marilhac) is a commune in the Charente department in southwestern France.

== Population ==
Historical population
Year	Pop.	±% p.a.
1968	521	—
1975	599	+2.01%
1982	574	−0.61%
1990	626	+1.09%
1999	617	−0.16%
2007	703	+1.64%
2012	824	+3.23%
2017	824	+0.00%
2023	825	+0.02%
Source: INSEE

== See also ==
- Communes of the Charente department
