= Courlac =

- Commune
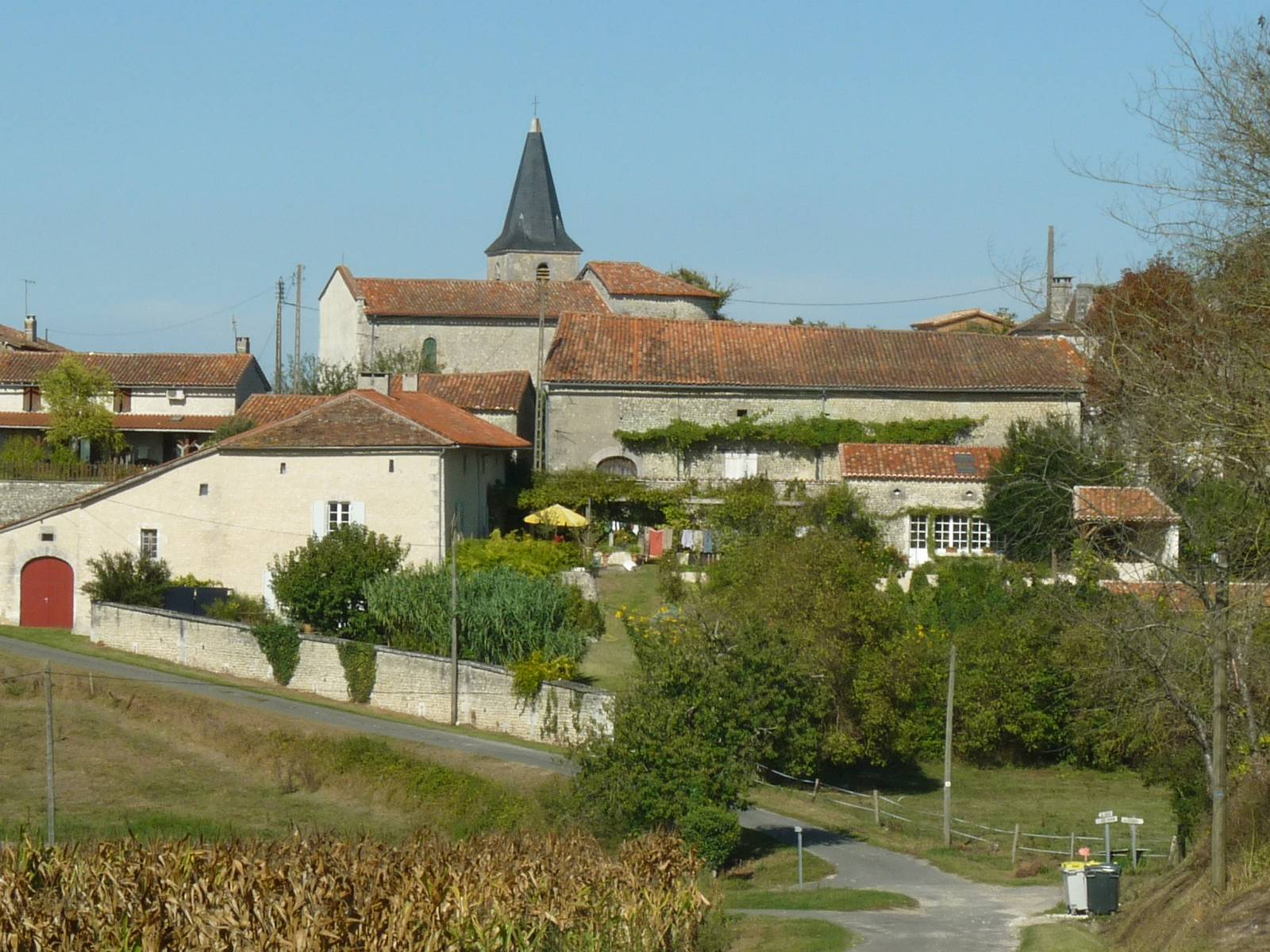
- A general view of Courlac
- Location of Courlac
- Location within France Location within Nouvelle-Aquitaine
- Coordinates: 45°18′06″N 0°05′35″E
- Country: France
- Region: Nouvelle-Aquitaine
- Department: Charente
- Arrondissement: Angoulême
- Canton: Tude-et-Lavalette
- Intercommunality: Lavalette Tude Dronne

Government
  - Mayor (2020–2026): François Désiré Di Virgilio
- Area^{1}: 6.58 km^{2} (2.54 sq mi)
- Elevation: 122 m (400 ft)
- Highest elevation: 139 m (456 ft)
- Lowest elevation: 48 m (157 ft)
- Population (2023): 59
  - Density: 9.0/km^{2} (23/sq mi)
- Time zone: UTC+01:00 (CET)
  - Summer (DST): UTC+02:00 (CEST)
- INSEE/Postal code: 16112 /16210
- ^{1} French Land Register data, which excludes lakes, ponds, glaciers > 1 km^{2} (0.386 sq mi or 247 acres) and river estuaries.

Courlac (French pronunciation: [kuʁlak]) is a commune in the Charente department in southwestern France.

== Population ==
Historical population
Year	Pop.	±% p.a.
1968	92	—
1975	84	−1.29%
1982	80	−0.69%
1990	64	−2.75%
1999	59	−0.90%
2007	66	+1.41%
2012	64	−0.61%
2017	54	−3.34%
2023	59	+1.49%
Source: INSEE

== See also ==
- Communes of the Charente department
