= Grassac =

- Commune
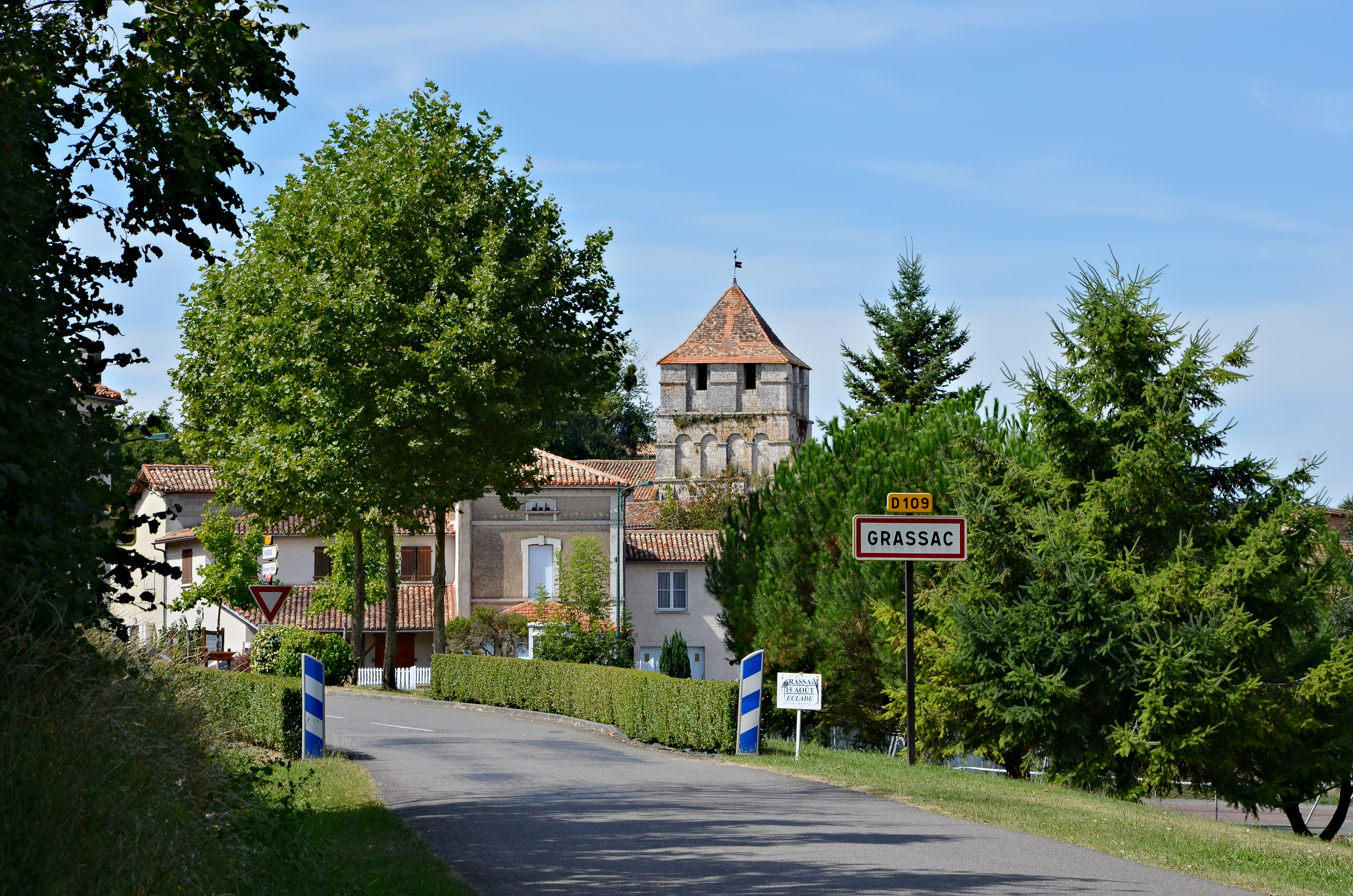
- The D109 road into Grassac

- Coat of arms
- Location of Grassac
- Location within France Location within Nouvelle-Aquitaine
- Coordinates: 45°35′12″N 0°24′13″E
- Country: France
- Region: Nouvelle-Aquitaine
- Department: Charente
- Arrondissement: Angoulême
- Canton: Val de Tardoire

Government
  - Mayor (2020–2026): Jean Louis Lapouge
- Area^{1}: 28.23 km^{2} (10.90 sq mi)
- Elevation: 220 m (720 ft)
- Highest elevation: 225 m (738 ft)
- Lowest elevation: 107 m (351 ft)
- Population (2023): 308
  - Density: 10.9/km^{2} (28.3/sq mi)
- Time zone: UTC+01:00 (CET)
  - Summer (DST): UTC+02:00 (CEST)
- INSEE/Postal code: 16158 /16380
- ^{1} French Land Register data, which excludes lakes, ponds, glaciers > 1 km^{2} (0.386 sq mi or 247 acres) and river estuaries.

Grassac (French pronunciation: [ɡʁasak]; Occitan: Graçac) is a commune in the Charente department in southwestern France.

== Population ==
Historical population
Year	Pop.	±% p.a.
1968	280	—
1975	268	−0.62%
1982	263	−0.27%
1990	285	+1.01%
1999	274	−0.44%
2007	275	+0.05%
2012	305	+2.09%
2017	323	+1.15%
2023	308	−0.79%
Source: INSEE

== See also ==
- Communes of the Charente department
