= Chazelles, Charente =

Chazelles
- Commune
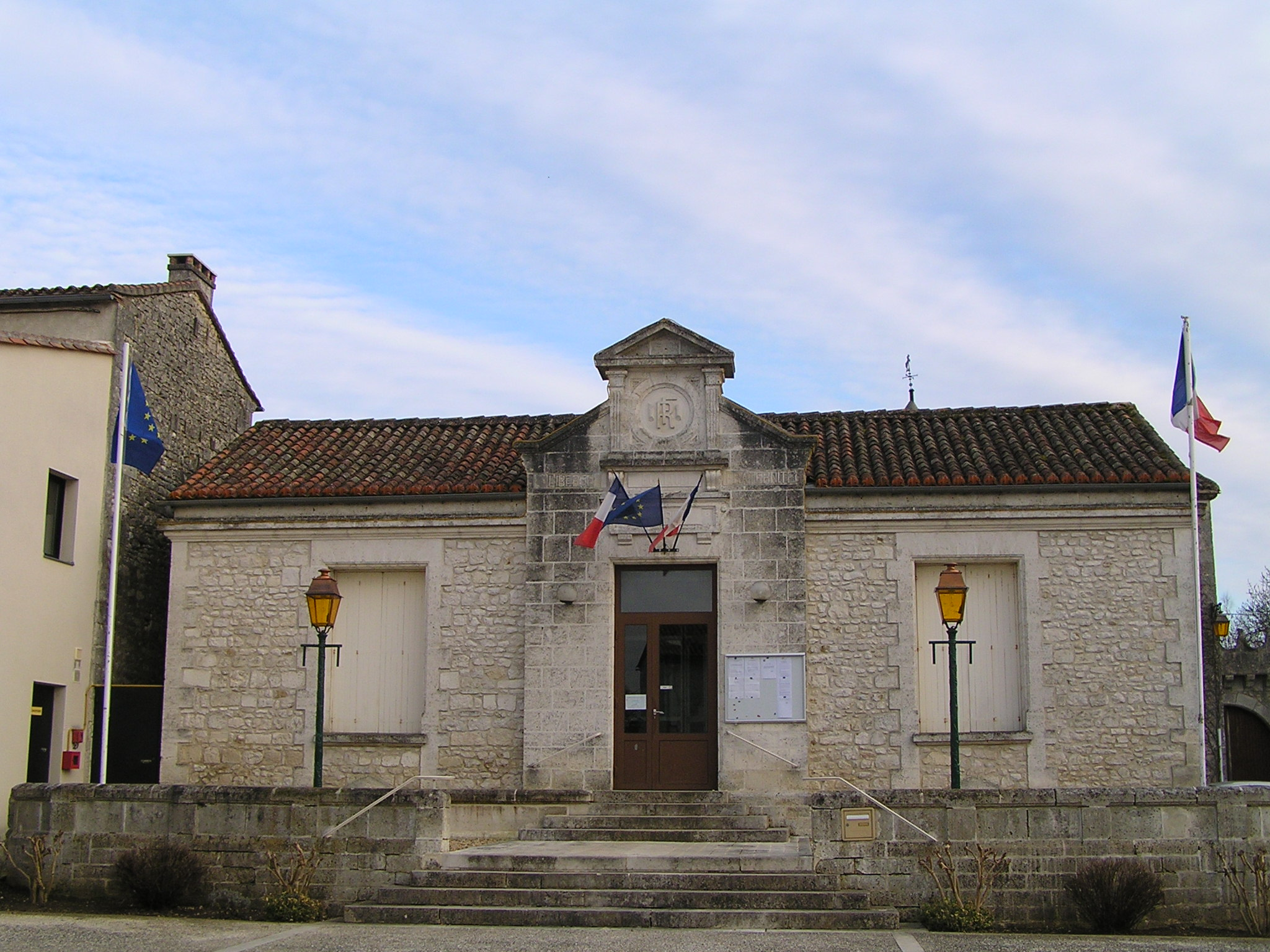
- Town hall
- Location of Chazelles
- Location within France Location within Nouvelle-Aquitaine
- Coordinates: 45°38′53″N 0°22′05″E
- Country: France
- Region: Nouvelle-Aquitaine
- Department: Charente
- Arrondissement: Angoulême
- Canton: Val de Tardoire

Government
  - Mayor (2020–2026): Jean-Marc Brouillet
- Area^{1}: 25.80 km^{2} (9.96 sq mi)
- Elevation: 95 m (312 ft)
- Highest elevation: 146 m (479 ft)
- Lowest elevation: 84 m (276 ft)
- Population (2023): 1,543
  - Density: 59.81/km^{2} (154.9/sq mi)
- Time zone: UTC+01:00 (CET)
  - Summer (DST): UTC+02:00 (CEST)
- INSEE/Postal code: 16093 /16380
- ^{1} French Land Register data, which excludes lakes, ponds, glaciers > 1 km^{2} (0.386 sq mi or 247 acres) and river estuaries.

Chazelles (French pronunciation: [ʃazɛl]; Limousin: Chasèlas) is a commune in the Charente department in southwestern France.

== Population ==
Historical population
Year	Pop.	±% p.a.
1968	1,067	—
1975	1,065	−0.03%
1982	1,315	+3.06%
1990	1,428	+1.04%
1999	1,391	−0.29%
2007	1,524	+1.15%
2012	1,500	−0.32%
2017	1,558	+0.76%
2023	1,543	−0.16%
Source: INSEE

== See also ==
- Communes of the Charente department
