= Pillac =

- Commune
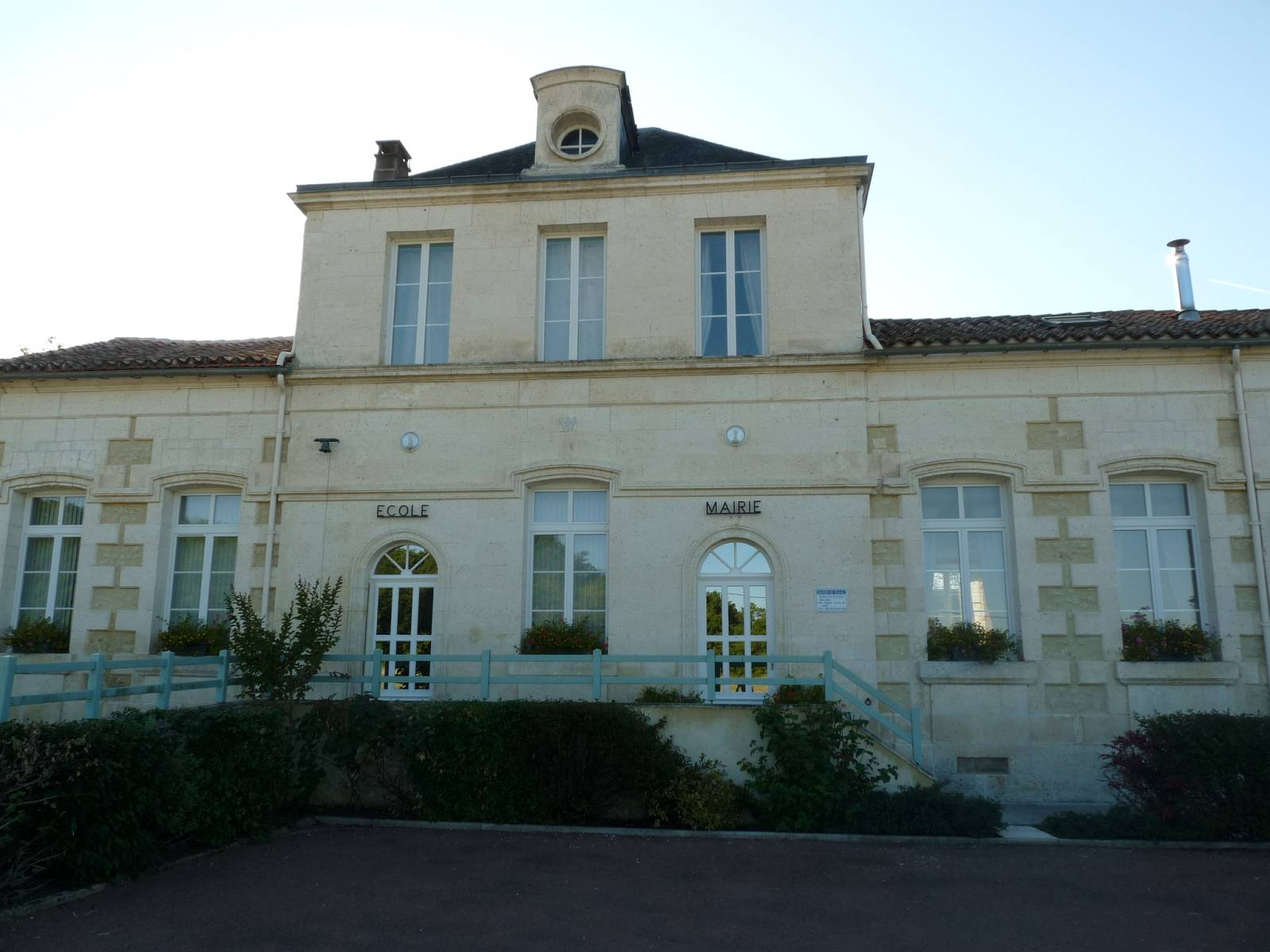
- Town hall
- Location of Pillac
- Location within France Location within Nouvelle-Aquitaine
- Coordinates: 45°19′31″N 0°11′32″E
- Country: France
- Region: Nouvelle-Aquitaine
- Department: Charente
- Arrondissement: Angoulême
- Canton: Tude-et-Lavalette
- Intercommunality: Lavalette Tude Dronne

Government
  - Mayor (2020–2026): Dominique Streiff
- Area^{1}: 19.64 km^{2} (7.58 sq mi)
- Elevation: 82 m (269 ft)
- Highest elevation: 165 m (541 ft)
- Lowest elevation: 53 m (174 ft)
- Population (2023): 243
  - Density: 12.4/km^{2} (32.0/sq mi)
- Time zone: UTC+01:00 (CET)
  - Summer (DST): UTC+02:00 (CEST)
- INSEE/Postal code: 16260 /16390
- ^{1} French Land Register data, which excludes lakes, ponds, glaciers > 1 km^{2} (0.386 sq mi or 247 acres) and river estuaries.

Pillac (French pronunciation: [pijak]; Occitan: Pilhac) is a commune in the Charente department in southwestern France.

== Population ==
Historical population
Year	Pop.	±% p.a.
1968	356	—
1975	307	−2.09%
1982	267	−1.97%
1990	260	−0.33%
1999	269	+0.38%
2007	256	−0.62%
2012	264	+0.62%
2017	266	+0.15%
2023	243	−1.50%
Source: INSEE

== See also ==
- Communes of the Charente department
