= Pranzac =

- Commune
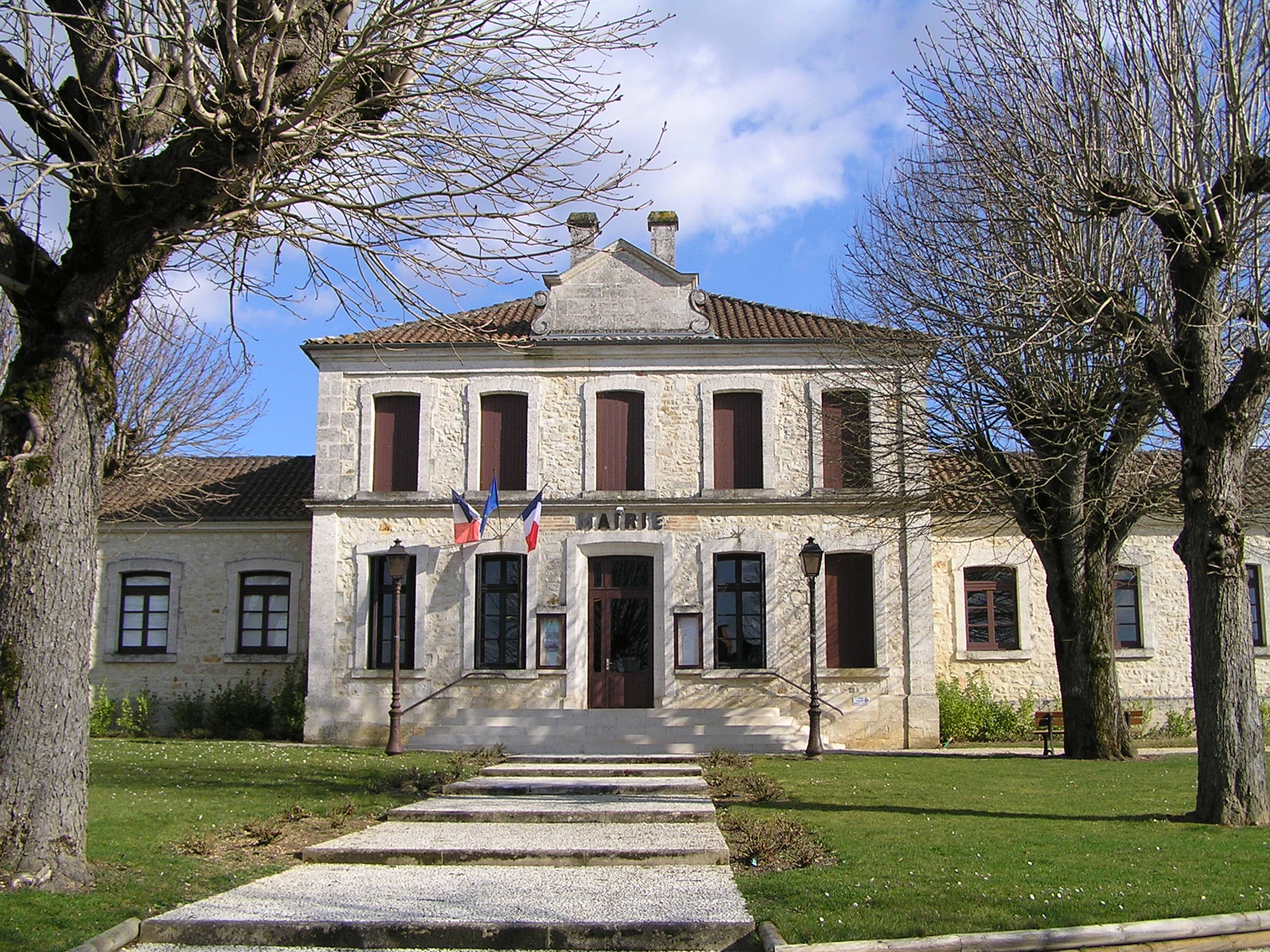
- Town hall
- Location of Pranzac
- Location within France Location within Nouvelle-Aquitaine
- Coordinates: 45°40′16″N 0°21′05″E
- Country: France
- Region: Nouvelle-Aquitaine
- Department: Charente
- Arrondissement: Angoulême
- Canton: Val de Tardoire

Government
  - Mayor (2020–2026): Bernard Terrade
- Area^{1}: 15.06 km^{2} (5.81 sq mi)
- Elevation: 118 m (387 ft)
- Highest elevation: 131 m (430 ft)
- Lowest elevation: 80 m (260 ft)
- Population (2023): 872
  - Density: 57.9/km^{2} (150/sq mi)
- Time zone: UTC+01:00 (CET)
  - Summer (DST): UTC+02:00 (CEST)
- INSEE/Postal code: 16269 /16110
- ^{1} French Land Register data, which excludes lakes, ponds, glaciers > 1 km^{2} (0.386 sq mi or 247 acres) and river estuaries.

Pranzac (French pronunciation: [pʁɑ̃zak]) is a commune in the Charente department in southwestern France.

== Population ==
Historical population
Year	Pop.	±% p.a.
1968	629	—
1975	667	+0.84%
1982	790	+2.45%
1990	874	+1.27%
1999	792	−1.09%
2007	888	+1.44%
2012	920	+0.71%
2017	903	−0.37%
2023	872	−0.58%
Source: INSEE

== See also ==
- Communes of the Charente department
