= Saint-Sornin, Charente =

Saint-Sornin
- Commune
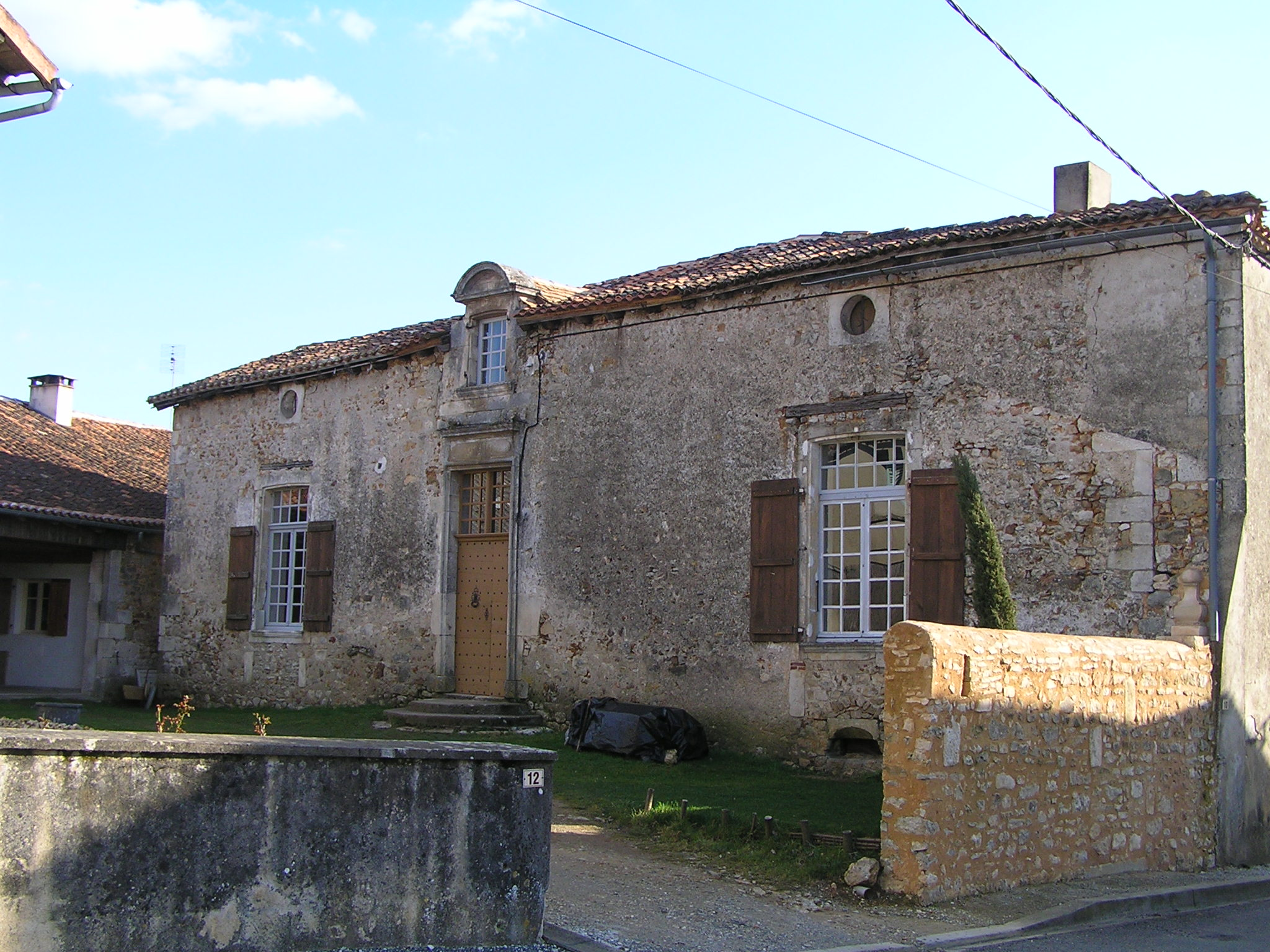
- Old house
- Location of Saint-Sornin
- Location within France Location within Nouvelle-Aquitaine
- Coordinates: 45°41′41″N 0°26′11″E
- Country: France
- Region: Nouvelle-Aquitaine
- Department: Charente
- Arrondissement: Angoulême
- Canton: Val de Tardoire
- Intercommunality: La Rochefoucauld - Porte du Périgord

Government
  - Mayor (2020–2026): Michaël Canit
- Area^{1}: 11.27 km^{2} (4.35 sq mi)
- Elevation: 185 m (607 ft)
- Highest elevation: 242 m (794 ft)
- Lowest elevation: 89 m (292 ft)
- Population (2023): 844
  - Density: 74.9/km^{2} (194/sq mi)
- Time zone: UTC+01:00 (CET)
  - Summer (DST): UTC+02:00 (CEST)
- INSEE/Postal code: 16353 /16220
- ^{1} French Land Register data, which excludes lakes, ponds, glaciers > 1 km^{2} (0.386 sq mi or 247 acres) and river estuaries.

Saint-Sornin (French pronunciation: [sɛ̃ sɔʁnɛ̃]; Occitan: Sent Sòrnin) is a commune in the Charente department in southwestern France.

== Population ==
Historical population
| Year | Pop. | ±% p.a. |
|---|---|---|
| 1968 | 618 | — |
| 1975 | 615 | −0.07% |
| 1982 | 673 | +1.30% |
| 1990 | 694 | +0.38% |
| 1999 | 715 | +0.33% |
| 2007 | 811 | +1.59% |
| 2012 | 870 | +1.41% |
| 2017 | 801 | −1.64% |
| 2023 | 844 | +0.88% |
Source: INSEE

== See also ==
- Communes of the Charente department
