= Montbron =

- Commune
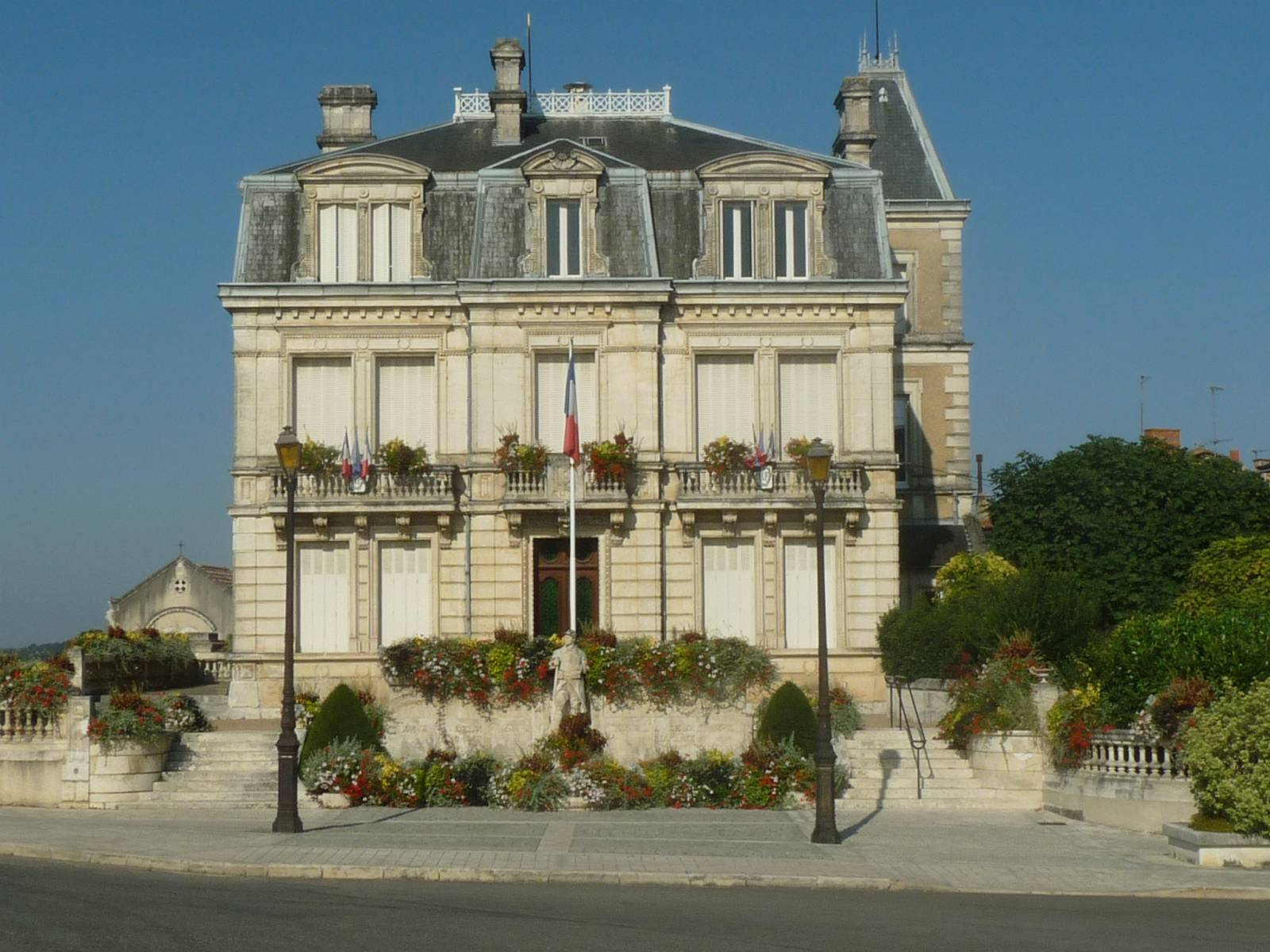
- Town hall

- Coat of arms
- Location of Montbron
- Location within France Location within Nouvelle-Aquitaine
- Coordinates: 45°40′05″N 0°30′06″E
- Country: France
- Region: Nouvelle-Aquitaine
- Department: Charente
- Arrondissement: Angoulême
- Canton: Val de Tardoire

Government
  - Mayor (2020–2026): Gwenhaël François
- Area^{1}: 43.34 km^{2} (16.73 sq mi)
- Elevation: 150 m (490 ft)
- Highest elevation: 287 m (942 ft)
- Lowest elevation: 95 m (312 ft)
- Population (2023): 2,000
  - Density: 46/km^{2} (120/sq mi)
- Time zone: UTC+01:00 (CET)
  - Summer (DST): UTC+02:00 (CEST)
- INSEE/Postal code: 16223 /16220
- ^{1} French Land Register data, which excludes lakes, ponds, glaciers > 1 km^{2} (0.386 sq mi or 247 acres) and river estuaries.

Montbron (French pronunciation: [mɔ̃bʁɔ̃]; Limousin: Montberol) is a commune in the Charente department in southwestern France on the Tardoire river.

François Victor Alphonse Aulard (1849–1928) was born in Montbron. He was the first professional French historian of the French Revolution and of Napoleon.

== Population ==
Historical population

Year	Pop.	±% p.a.
1793	2,668	—
1800	3,101	+2.17%
1806	2,980	−0.66%
1821	3,136	+0.34%
1831	3,172	+0.11%
1841	3,189	+0.05%
1846	3,276	+0.54%
1851	3,331	+0.33%
1856	3,152	−1.10%
1861	3,240	+0.55%
1866	3,300	+0.37%
1872	3,168	−0.68%
1876	3,264	+0.75%
1881	3,323	+0.36%
1886	3,426	+0.61%
1891	3,135	−1.76%
1896	3,027	−0.70%
1901	2,983	−0.29%

Year	Pop.	±% p.a.
1906	3,005	+0.15%
1911	2,729	−1.91%
1921	2,461	−1.03%
1926	2,552	+0.73%
1931	2,530	−0.17%
1936	2,563	+0.26%
1946	2,695	+0.50%
1954	2,433	−1.27%
1962	2,469	+0.18%
1968	2,383	−0.59%
1975	2,541	+0.92%
1982	2,604	+0.35%
1990	2,422	−0.90%
1999	2,241	−0.86%
2007	2,167	−0.42%
2012	2,177	+0.09%
2017	2,028	−1.41%
2023	2,000	−0.23%

Source: EHESS and INSEE (1968-2023)

== See also ==
- Communes of the Charente department
