= Canton of Villebois-Lavalette =

Coordinates: 45°29′0″N 0°17′0″E

Villebois-Lavalette
- Former canton
- Interactive map of Villebois-Lavalette
- Country: France
- Region: Nouvelle-Aquitaine
- Department: Charente
- No. of communes: {{{nbcomm}}}
- Disbanded: 2015
- Area: 312 km^{2} (120 sq mi)
- Population (2012): 7,608
  - Density: 24.4/km^{2} (63.2/sq mi)

The canton of Villebois-Lavalette is located in the Charente department in southwestern France. It had 7,608 inhabitants (2012). It was disbanded following the French canton reorganisation which came into effect in March 2015. It consisted of 17 communes, which joined the canton of Tude-et-Lavalette in 2015.

The canton comprised the following communes:

- Blanzaguet-Saint-Cybard
- Charmant
- Chavenat
- Combiers
- Dignac
- Édon
- Fouquebrune
- Gardes-le-Pontaroux
- Gurat
- Juillaguet
- Magnac-Lavalette-Villars
- Ronsenac
- Rougnac
- Sers
- Torsac
- Vaux-Lavalette
- Villebois-Lavalette
