= Angel Hays =

French inventor (1917–2008)

Angel-Camille Hays (born 6 June 1917, Montmoreau; died 12 January 2008, Saint-Quentin-de-Chalais, France) was a French inventor and minor celebrity. Some sources, using the misspelled name Angelo Hays, claim he survived a premature burial for two days.

Hays, a farm worker and inventor, said that on 1 September 1937 he fractured his skull 17 times in a motorcycle accident, and he said he was "considered to be dead" and "was almost buried alive". His story changed throughout the years. In May 1958, Hays told the press that he had spent two days in the coffin and was about to be transported to the cemetery of Rouffiac when insurance inspectors discovered he was alive, and he then spent three years in a coma. Another time, he claimed he lay in the closed coffin in a chapel for two days until his uncle Marcel arrived for the funeral, who wanted to see the body and found it to be warm. Six weeks later, Angel had recovered from his concussion. There is no known back-up for any of these claims. Sometime, the story somehow evolved into him actually spending two days buried alive in a cemetery before being saved. The book Scheintot begraben (Buried seemingly dead, 1978) by German journalist Claus-Erich Boetzkes described the accident, burial and discovery of Angelo Hays in vivid detail, but didn't give any sources. When Stern magazine visited Hays in response to the book, he did not claim that he had been buried after his accident. The article didn't comment on the inconsistency and also included the wrong given name Angelo.

Hays told his story when he presented his invention of a coffin that detected motion, in order to save someone buried prematurely. He filed a patent application for an "apparatus intended to detect whether the state of death is apparent or real" in 1955. The patent was granted in January 1958 under the French patent number 1.150.656.

He later developed a coffin that could sustain human life and even grant the buried person conveniences and entertainment, which he demonstrated at a fair in Saint-Aulaye, France in 1974, surviving 30 hours buried underground, and in 1984 survived two days buried at the "Festival des records et inventions" in Aubigny, France.

His invention led to several appearances on TV, including shows hosted by Jacques Martin and Philippe Bouvard. Bouvard wrote about him, "Angel Hays is certainly the most disturbing character I have ever received. He showed up at the studio with the coffin he had personally fitted out, in which he spends several days each month, six feet underground. [...] His coffin is padded and equipped with every comfort: a transistor radio that allows him to stay up to date with what's happening up on terra firma, some hearty snacks, several bottles of wine which he sips through a tube, and, of course, an air pipe connected to the surface.
