= Saint-Laurent-des-Combes =

Saint-Laurent-des-Combes may refer to the following places in France:

- Saint-Laurent-des-Combes, Charente, a commune in the Charente department
- Saint-Laurent-des-Combes, Gironde, a commune in the Gironde department
