= Orival =

Orival may refer to the following places in France:

- Orival, Charente, a commune in the Charente department
- Orival, Seine-Maritime, a commune in the Seine-Maritime department
- Orival, Somme, a defunct (since 1972) commune in the Somme department. See Offignies
