= Brie-sous-Chalais =

- Commune
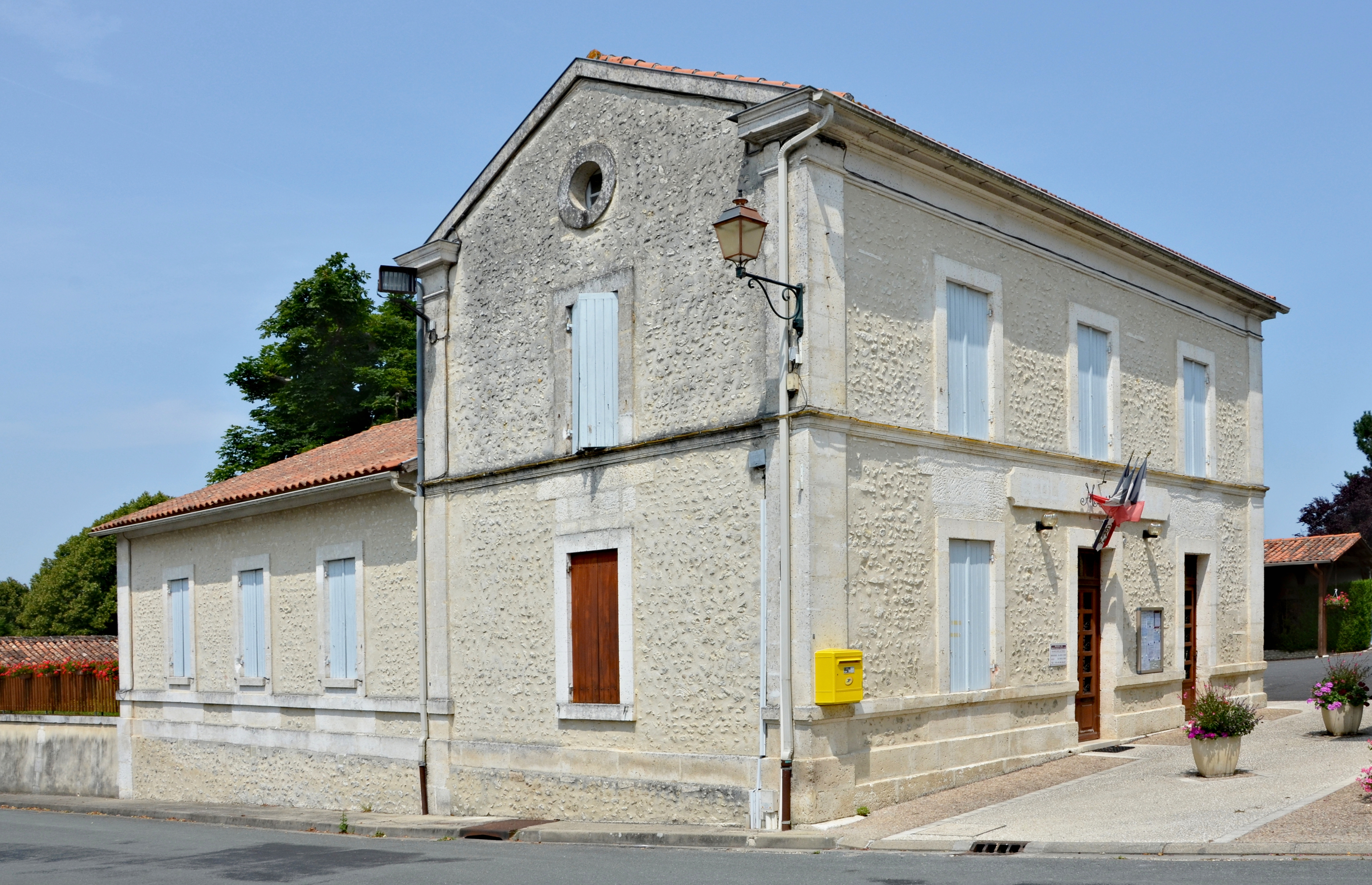
- The town hall in Brie-sous-Chalais
- Location of Brie-sous-Chalais
- Location within France Location within Nouvelle-Aquitaine
- Coordinates: 45°18′57″N 0°00′25″E
- Country: France
- Region: Nouvelle-Aquitaine
- Department: Charente
- Arrondissement: Angoulême
- Canton: Tude-et-Lavalette

Government
  - Mayor (2020–2026): Pascal Borde
- Area^{1}: 10.34 km^{2} (3.99 sq mi)
- Elevation: 95 m (312 ft)
- Highest elevation: 158 m (518 ft)
- Lowest elevation: 54 m (177 ft)
- Population (2023): 157
  - Density: 15.2/km^{2} (39.3/sq mi)
- Time zone: UTC+01:00 (CET)
  - Summer (DST): UTC+02:00 (CEST)
- INSEE/Postal code: 16063 /16210
- ^{1} French Land Register data, which excludes lakes, ponds, glaciers > 1 km^{2} (0.386 sq mi or 247 acres) and river estuaries.

Brie-sous-Chalais (French pronunciation: [bʁi su ʃalɛ], literally Brie under Chalais) is a commune in the Charente department in southwestern France.

== Population ==
Historical population
Year	Pop.	±% p.a.
1968	212	—
1975	185	−1.93%
1982	167	−1.45%
1990	160	−0.53%
1999	159	−0.07%
2007	167	+0.62%
2012	169	+0.24%
2017	154	−1.84%
2023	157	+0.32%
Source: INSEE

== See also ==
- Communes of the Charente department
