= Courgeac =

- Commune
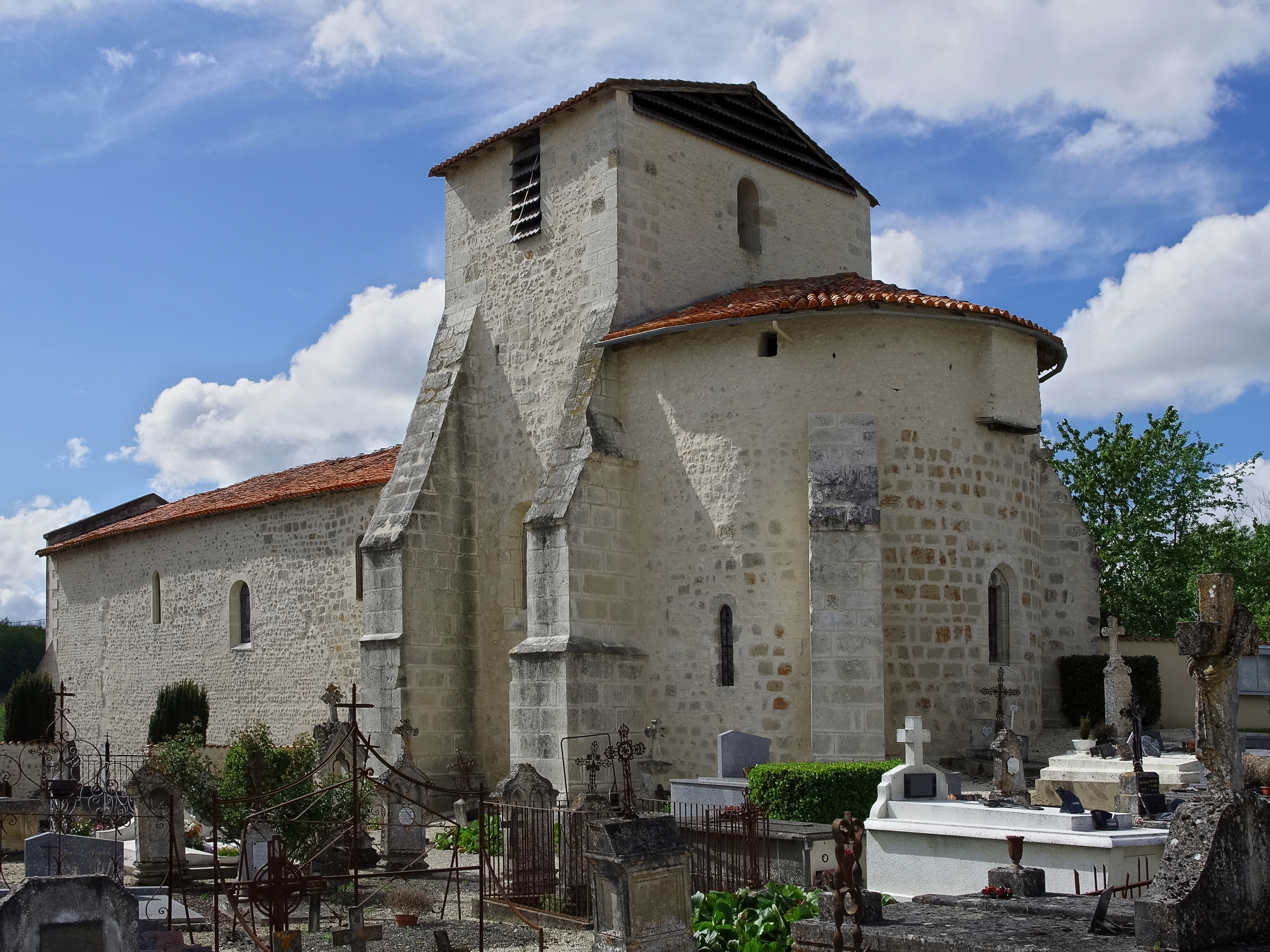
- The church in Courgeac
- Location of Courgeac
- Location within France Location within Nouvelle-Aquitaine
- Coordinates: 45°23′42″N 0°05′08″E
- Country: France
- Region: Nouvelle-Aquitaine
- Department: Charente
- Arrondissement: Angoulême
- Canton: Tude-et-Lavalette
- Intercommunality: Lavalette Tude Dronne

Government
  - Mayor (2020–2026): Sébastien Piot
- Area^{1}: 18.42 km^{2} (7.11 sq mi)
- Elevation: 110 m (360 ft)
- Highest elevation: 177 m (581 ft)
- Lowest elevation: 72 m (236 ft)
- Population (2023): 167
  - Density: 9.07/km^{2} (23.5/sq mi)
- Time zone: UTC+01:00 (CET)
  - Summer (DST): UTC+02:00 (CEST)
- INSEE/Postal code: 16111 /16190
- ^{1} French Land Register data, which excludes lakes, ponds, glaciers > 1 km^{2} (0.386 sq mi or 247 acres) and river estuaries.

Courgeac (French pronunciation: [kuʁʒak]) is a commune in the Charente department in southwestern France.

== Population ==
Historical population
Year	Pop.	±% p.a.
1968	249	—
1975	219	−1.82%
1982	205	−0.94%
1990	174	−2.03%
1999	175	+0.06%
2007	196	+1.43%
2012	207	+1.10%
2017	189	−1.80%
2023	167	−2.04%
Source: INSEE

== See also ==
- Communes of the Charente department
