= Boisné-la-Tude =

- Commune
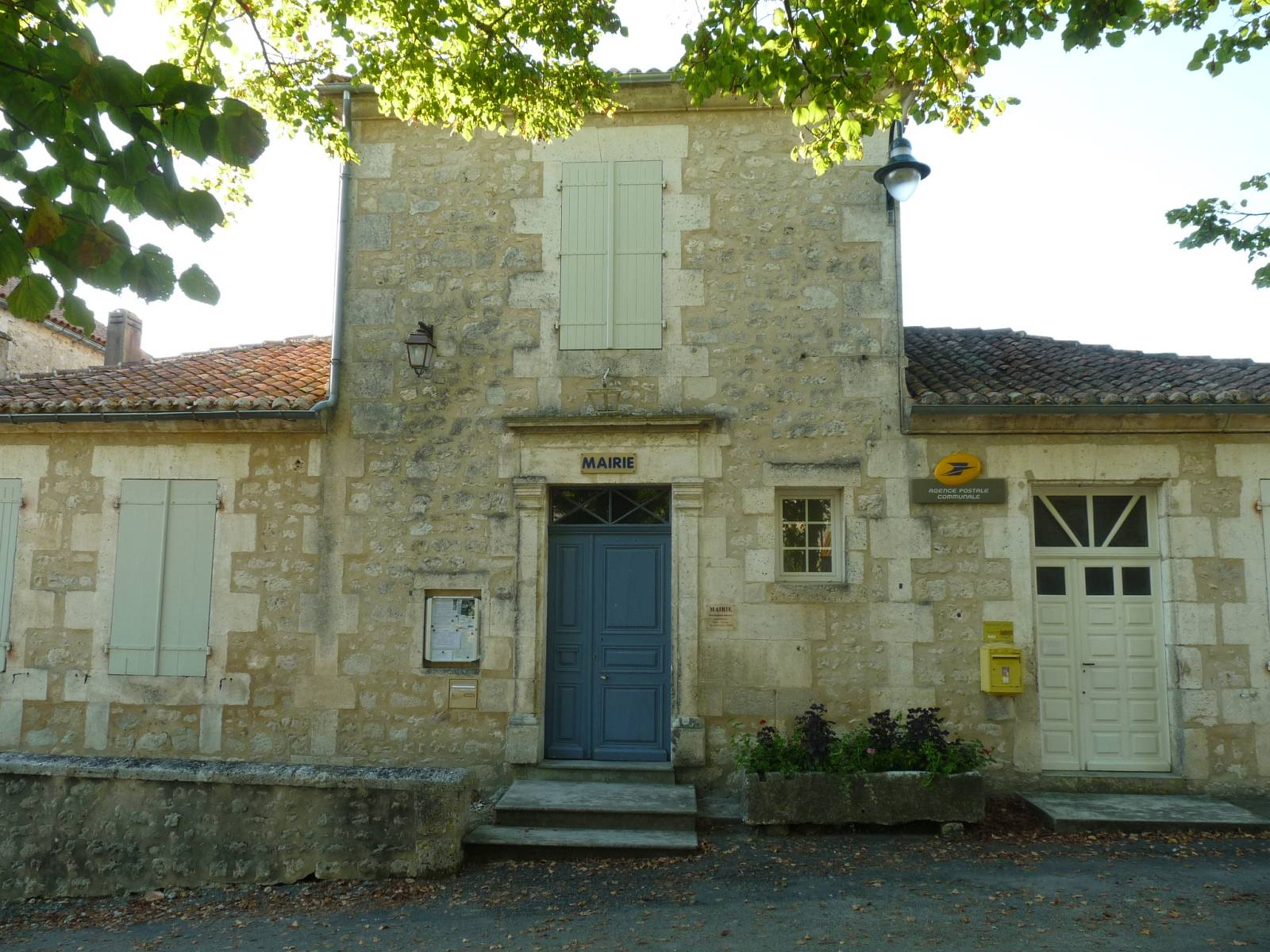
- The town hall in Boisné-la-Tude
- Location of Boisné-la-Tude
- Location within France Location within Nouvelle-Aquitaine
- Coordinates: 45°29′46″N 0°11′02″E
- Country: France
- Region: Nouvelle-Aquitaine
- Department: Charente
- Arrondissement: Angoulême
- Canton: Tude-et-Lavalette

Government
  - Mayor (2020–2026): Vincent Chapelet
- Area^{1}: 34.25 km^{2} (13.22 sq mi)
- Population (2023): 662
  - Density: 19.3/km^{2} (50.1/sq mi)
- Time zone: UTC+01:00 (CET)
  - Summer (DST): UTC+02:00 (CEST)
- INSEE/Postal code: 16082 /16320
- ^{1} French Land Register data, which excludes lakes, ponds, glaciers > 1 km^{2} (0.386 sq mi or 247 acres) and river estuaries.

Boisné-la-Tude (French pronunciation: [bwane la tyd]) is a commune in the Charente department of southwestern France. The municipality was established on 1 January 2016 and consists of the former communes of Charmant, Chavenat and Juillaguet.

== See also ==
- Communes of the Charente department
