= Poullignac =

- Commune
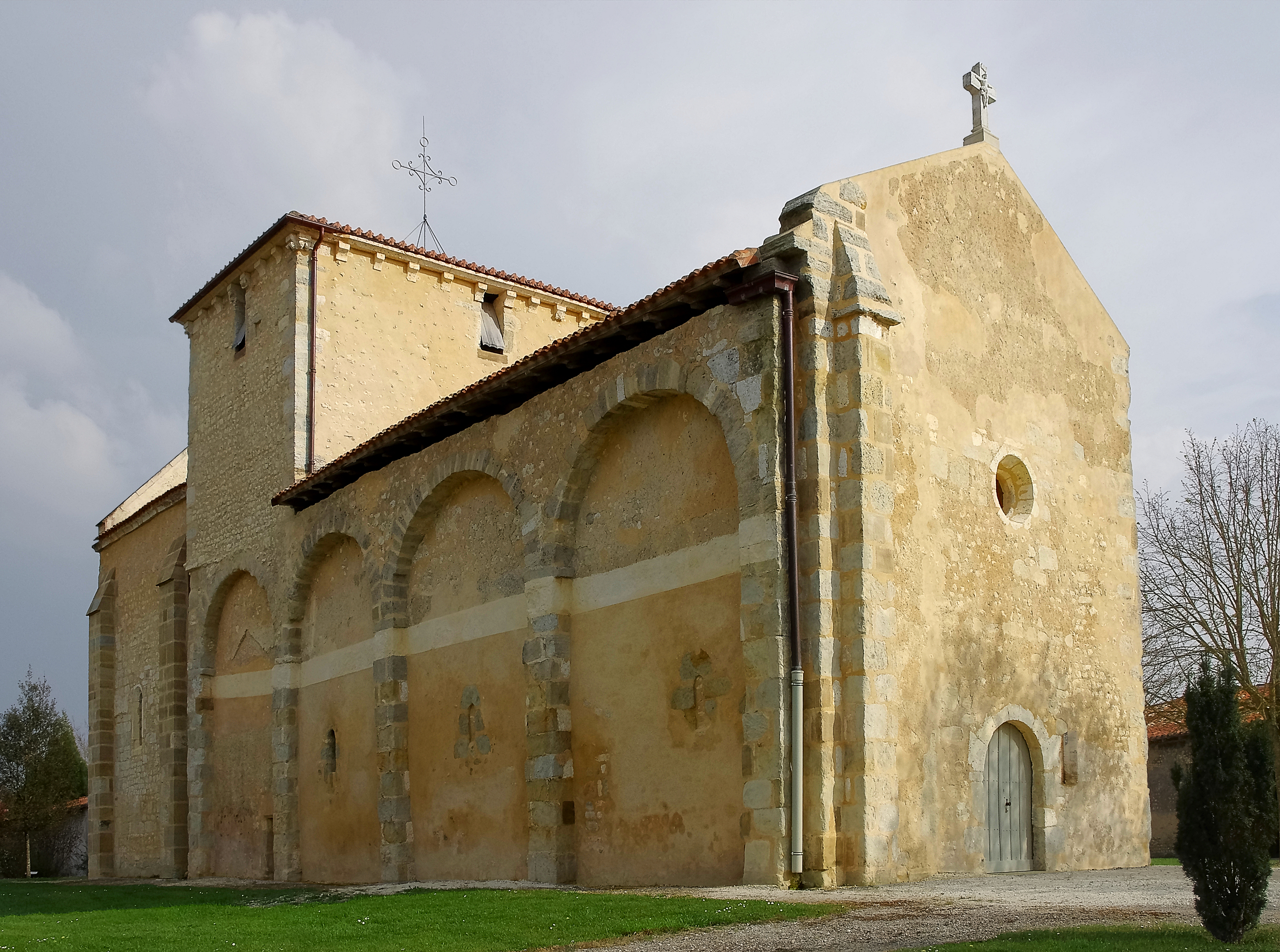
- The church in Poullignac
- Location of Poullignac
- Location within France Location within Nouvelle-Aquitaine
- Coordinates: 45°24′00″N 0°01′09″W
- Country: France
- Region: Nouvelle-Aquitaine
- Department: Charente
- Arrondissement: Angoulême
- Canton: Tude-et-Lavalette

Government
  - Mayor (2020–2026): Mireille Neeser
- Area^{1}: 8.94 km^{2} (3.45 sq mi)
- Elevation: 80 m (260 ft)
- Highest elevation: 167 m (548 ft)
- Lowest elevation: 63 m (207 ft)
- Population (2023): 107
  - Density: 12.0/km^{2} (31.0/sq mi)
- Time zone: UTC+01:00 (CET)
  - Summer (DST): UTC+02:00 (CEST)
- INSEE/Postal code: 16267 /16190
- ^{1} French Land Register data, which excludes lakes, ponds, glaciers > 1 km^{2} (0.386 sq mi or 247 acres) and river estuaries.

Poullignac (French pronunciation: [puliɲak]) is a commune in the Charente department in southwestern France.

== Population ==
Historical population
Year	Pop.	±% p.a.
1968	143	—
1975	102	−4.71%
1982	124	+2.83%
1990	97	−3.02%
1999	77	−2.53%
2007	79	+0.32%
2012	77	−0.51%
2017	87	+2.47%
2023	107	+3.51%
Source: INSEE

== Sights ==
The Romanesque Church of Saint-Martin, built from the end of the 11th century to the beginning of the 12th, was classified as a historic monument in 1987. The apse was replaced in the 12th century with the current barrel vault choir. The brick vault in the nave dates from 1844. There are murals painted in the choir, and traces of paintings in the rest of the church.

== See also ==
- Communes of the Charente department
