= Saint-Martial, Charente =

Saint-Martial
- Commune
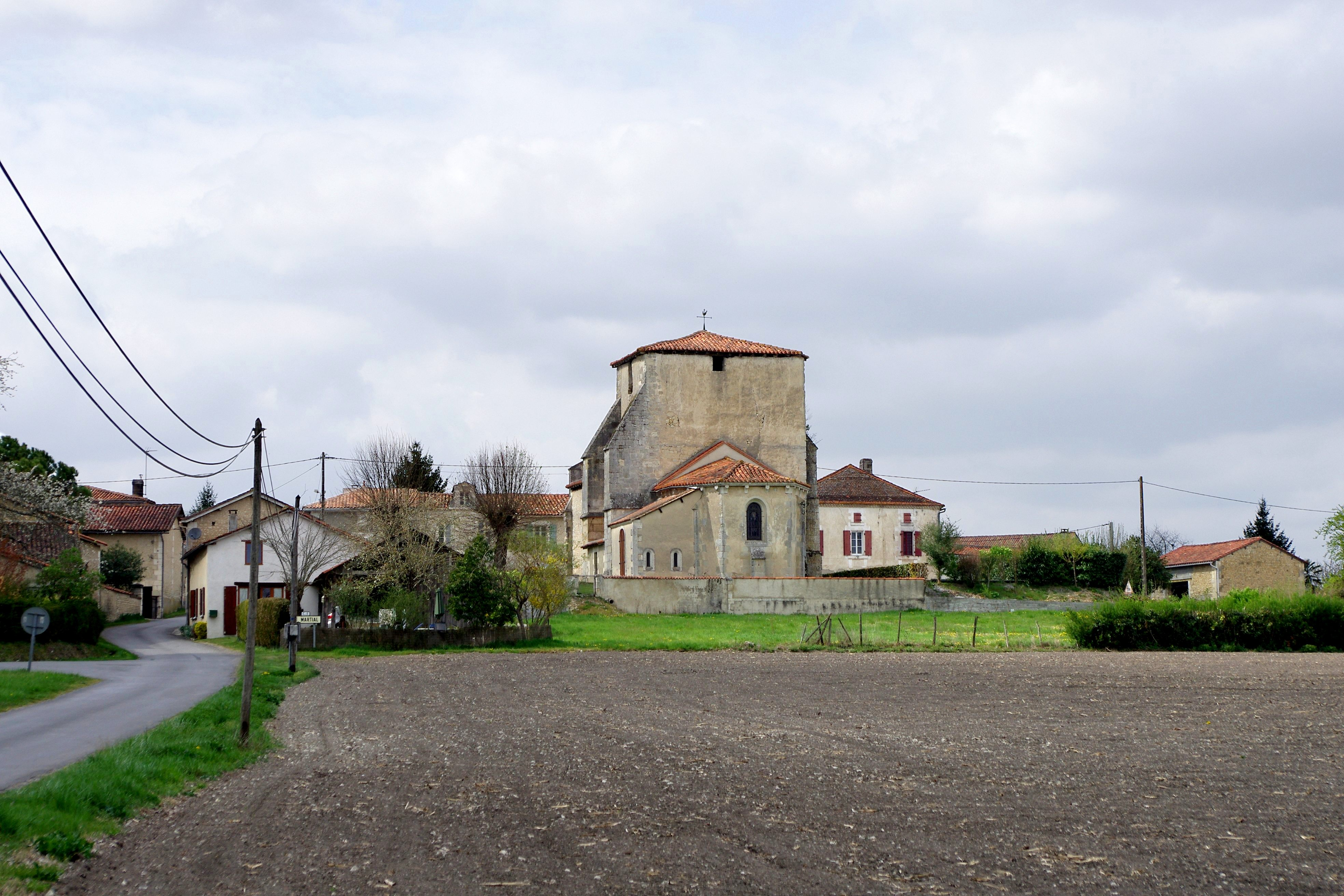
- The church and surroundings in Saint-Martial
- Location of Saint-Martial
- Location within France Location within Nouvelle-Aquitaine
- Coordinates: 45°22′22″N 0°03′27″E
- Country: France
- Region: Nouvelle-Aquitaine
- Department: Charente
- Arrondissement: Angoulême
- Canton: Tude-et-Lavalette

Government
  - Mayor (2020–2026): Alain Miklazewski
- Area^{1}: 9.31 km^{2} (3.59 sq mi)
- Elevation: 106 m (348 ft)
- Highest elevation: 181 m (594 ft)
- Lowest elevation: 72 m (236 ft)
- Population (2023): 122
  - Density: 13.1/km^{2} (33.9/sq mi)
- Time zone: UTC+01:00 (CET)
  - Summer (DST): UTC+02:00 (CEST)
- INSEE/Postal code: 16334 /16190
- ^{1} French Land Register data, which excludes lakes, ponds, glaciers > 1 km^{2} (0.386 sq mi or 247 acres) and river estuaries.

Saint-Martial (French pronunciation: [sɛ̃ maʁsjal]) is a commune in the Charente department in southwestern France.

== Population ==
Historical population
Year	Pop.	±% p.a.
1968	191	—
1975	177	−1.08%
1982	181	+0.32%
1990	163	−1.30%
1999	141	−1.60%
2007	148	+0.61%
2012	141	−0.96%
2017	131	−1.46%
2023	122	−1.18%
Source: INSEE

== See also ==
- Communes of the Charente department
