= Charmant =

- Part of Boisné-la-Tude
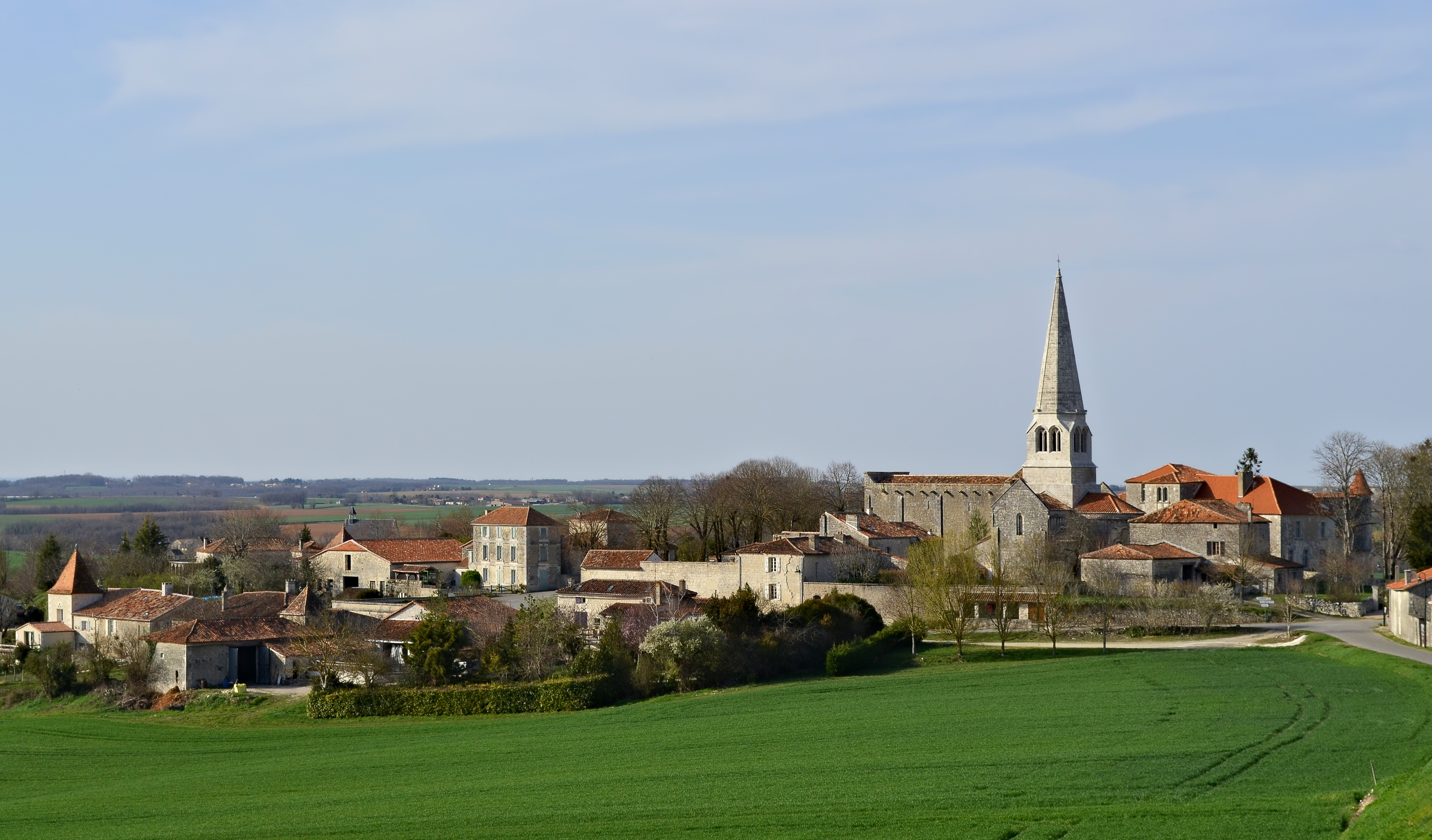
- Location of Charmant
- Location within France Location within Nouvelle-Aquitaine
- Coordinates: 45°29′50″N 0°11′05″E
- Country: France
- Region: Nouvelle-Aquitaine
- Department: Charente
- Arrondissement: Angoulême
- Canton: Tude-et-Lavalette
- Commune: Boisné-la-Tude
- Area^{1}: 17.15 km^{2} (6.62 sq mi)
- Elevation: 123 m (404 ft)
- Highest elevation: 203 m (666 ft)
- Lowest elevation: 89 m (292 ft)
- Population (2023): 332
  - Density: 19.4/km^{2} (50.1/sq mi)
- Time zone: UTC+01:00 (CET)
  - Summer (DST): UTC+02:00 (CEST)
- Postal code: 16320
- ^{1} French Land Register data, which excludes lakes, ponds, glaciers > 1 km^{2} (0.386 sq mi or 247 acres) and river estuaries.

Charmant (French pronunciation: [ʃaʁmɑ̃]) is a former commune in the Charente department in southwestern France. On 1 January 2016, it was merged into the new commune Boisné-la-Tude.

== See also ==
- Communes of the Charente department
