= Nonac =

- Commune
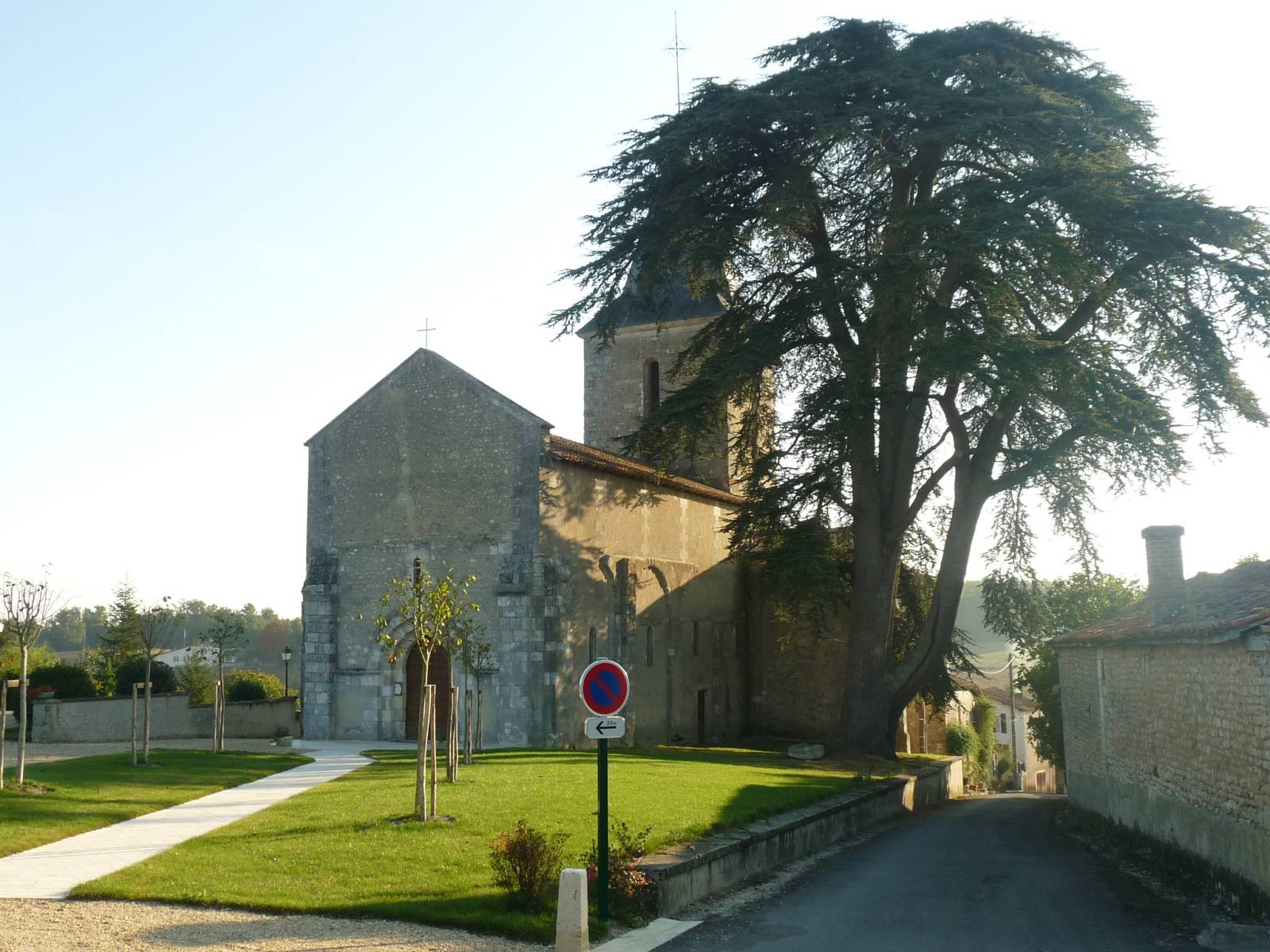
- The church in Nonac
- Location of Nonac
- Location within France Location within Nouvelle-Aquitaine
- Coordinates: 45°25′17″N 0°03′25″E
- Country: France
- Region: Nouvelle-Aquitaine
- Department: Charente
- Arrondissement: Angoulême
- Canton: Tude-et-Lavalette
- Intercommunality: Lavalette Tude Dronne

Government
  - Mayor (2020–2026): Maguy Blanchard
- Area^{1}: 20.84 km^{2} (8.05 sq mi)
- Elevation: 142 m (466 ft)
- Highest elevation: 178 m (584 ft)
- Lowest elevation: 73 m (240 ft)
- Population (2023): 266
  - Density: 12.8/km^{2} (33.1/sq mi)
- Time zone: UTC+01:00 (CET)
  - Summer (DST): UTC+02:00 (CEST)
- INSEE/Postal code: 16246 /16190
- ^{1} French Land Register data, which excludes lakes, ponds, glaciers > 1 km^{2} (0.386 sq mi or 247 acres) and river estuaries.

Nonac (French pronunciation: [nɔnak]) is a commune in the Charente department in southwestern France.

== Population ==
Historical population
Year	Pop.	±% p.a.
1968	414	—
1975	389	−0.89%
1982	327	−2.45%
1990	290	−1.49%
1999	315	+0.92%
2007	307	−0.32%
2012	304	−0.20%
2017	281	−1.56%
2023	266	−0.91%
Source: INSEE

== See also ==
- Communes of the Charente department
