= Nabinaud =

- Commune
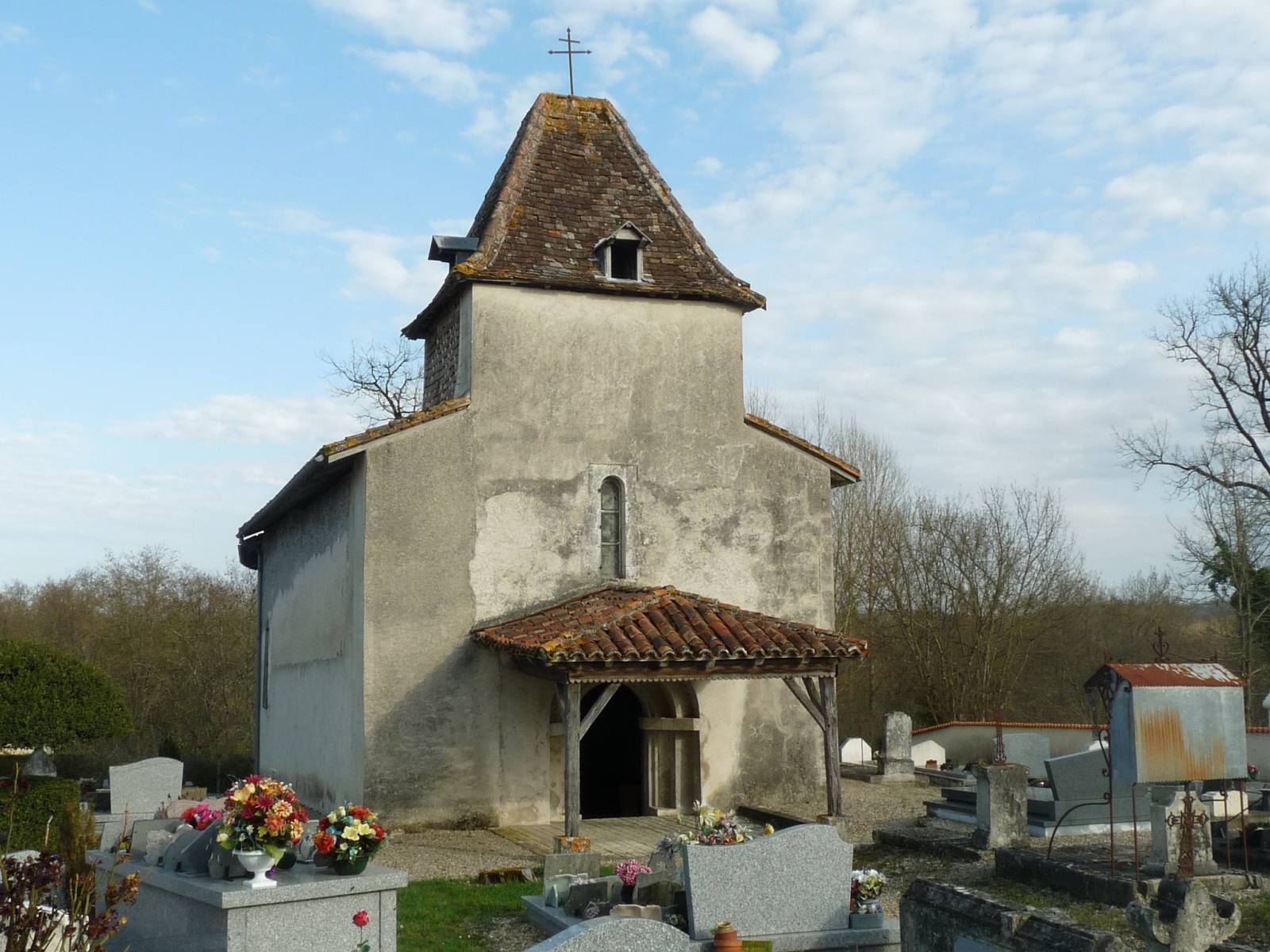
- The church in Nabinaud
- Location of Nabinaud
- Location within France Location within Nouvelle-Aquitaine
- Coordinates: 45°17′12″N 0°12′50″E
- Country: France
- Region: Nouvelle-Aquitaine
- Department: Charente
- Arrondissement: Angoulême
- Canton: Tude-et-Lavalette
- Intercommunality: Lavalette Tude Dronne

Government
  - Mayor (2020–2026): Josiane Bodet
- Area^{1}: 5.88 km^{2} (2.27 sq mi)
- Elevation: 62 m (203 ft)
- Highest elevation: 133 m (436 ft)
- Lowest elevation: 45 m (148 ft)
- Population (2023): 99
  - Density: 17/km^{2} (44/sq mi)
- Time zone: UTC+01:00 (CET)
  - Summer (DST): UTC+02:00 (CEST)
- INSEE/Postal code: 16240 /16390
- ^{1} French Land Register data, which excludes lakes, ponds, glaciers > 1 km^{2} (0.386 sq mi or 247 acres) and river estuaries.

Nabinaud (French pronunciation: [nabino]; Occitan: Nabinau) is a commune in the Charente department in southwestern France.

== Population ==
Historical population
Year	Pop.	±% p.a.
1968	104	—
1975	92	−1.74%
1982	87	−0.80%
1990	90	+0.42%
1999	89	−0.12%
2007	75	−2.12%
2012	91	+3.94%
2017	100	+1.90%
2023	99	−0.17%
Source: INSEE

== See also ==
- Communes of the Charente department
