= Juillaguet =

- Part of Boisné-la-Tude
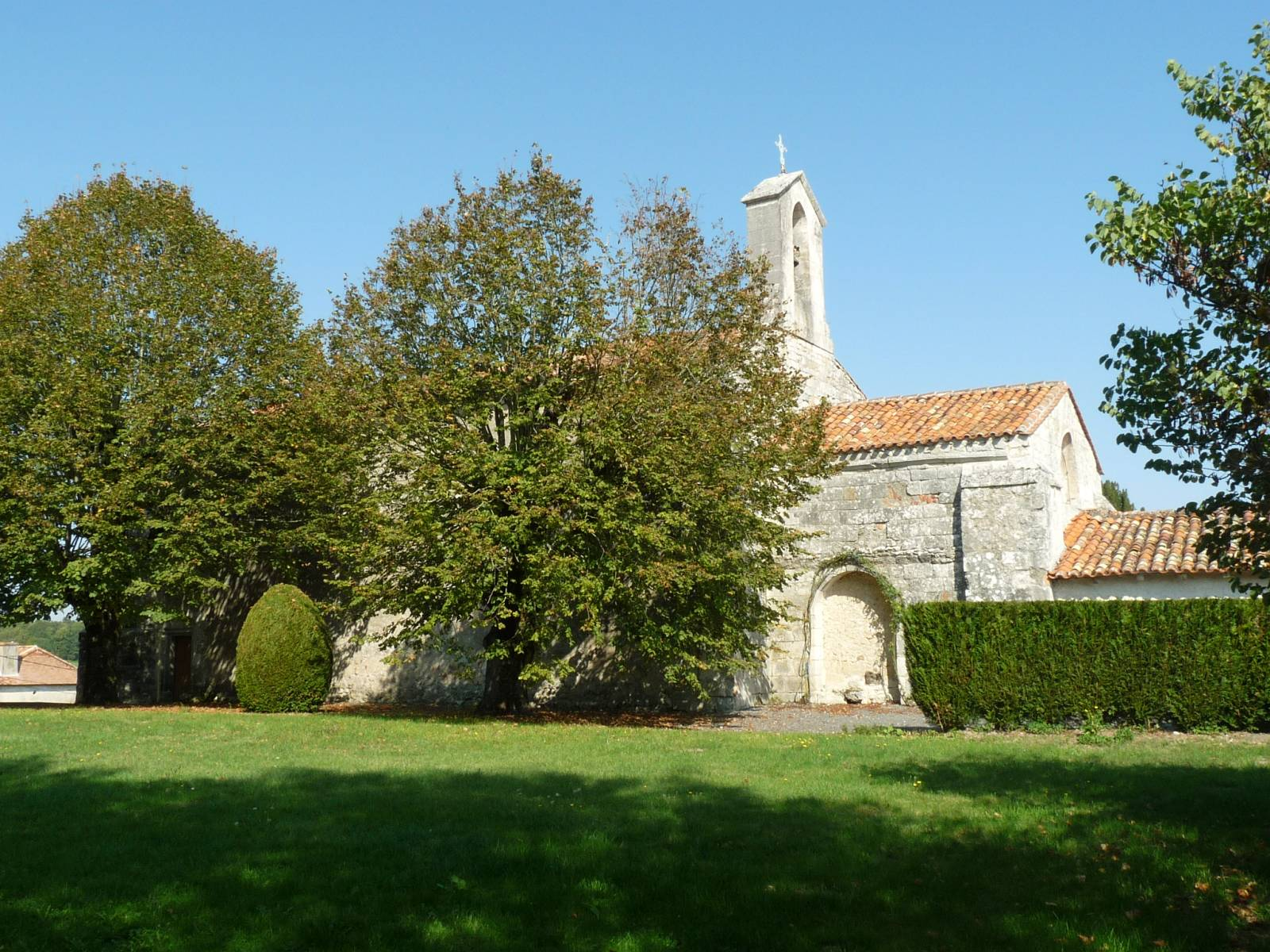
- Location of Juillaguet
- Location within France Location within Nouvelle-Aquitaine
- Coordinates: 45°28′43″N 0°12′49″E
- Country: France
- Region: Nouvelle-Aquitaine
- Department: Charente
- Arrondissement: Angoulême
- Canton: Tude-et-Lavalette
- Commune: Boisné-la-Tude
- Area^{1}: 7.27 km^{2} (2.81 sq mi)
- Elevation: 166 m (545 ft)
- Highest elevation: 203 m (666 ft)
- Lowest elevation: 103 m (338 ft)
- Population (2023): 157
  - Density: 21.6/km^{2} (55.9/sq mi)
- Time zone: UTC+01:00 (CET)
  - Summer (DST): UTC+02:00 (CEST)
- Postal code: 16320
- ^{1} French Land Register data, which excludes lakes, ponds, glaciers > 1 km^{2} (0.386 sq mi or 247 acres) and river estuaries.

Juillaguet (French pronunciation: [ʒɥijaɡɛ]) is a former commune in the Charente department in southwestern France. On 1 January 2016, it was merged into the new commune Boisné-la-Tude.

== See also ==
- Communes of the Charente department
