= Saint-Avit, Charente =

Saint-Avit
- Commune
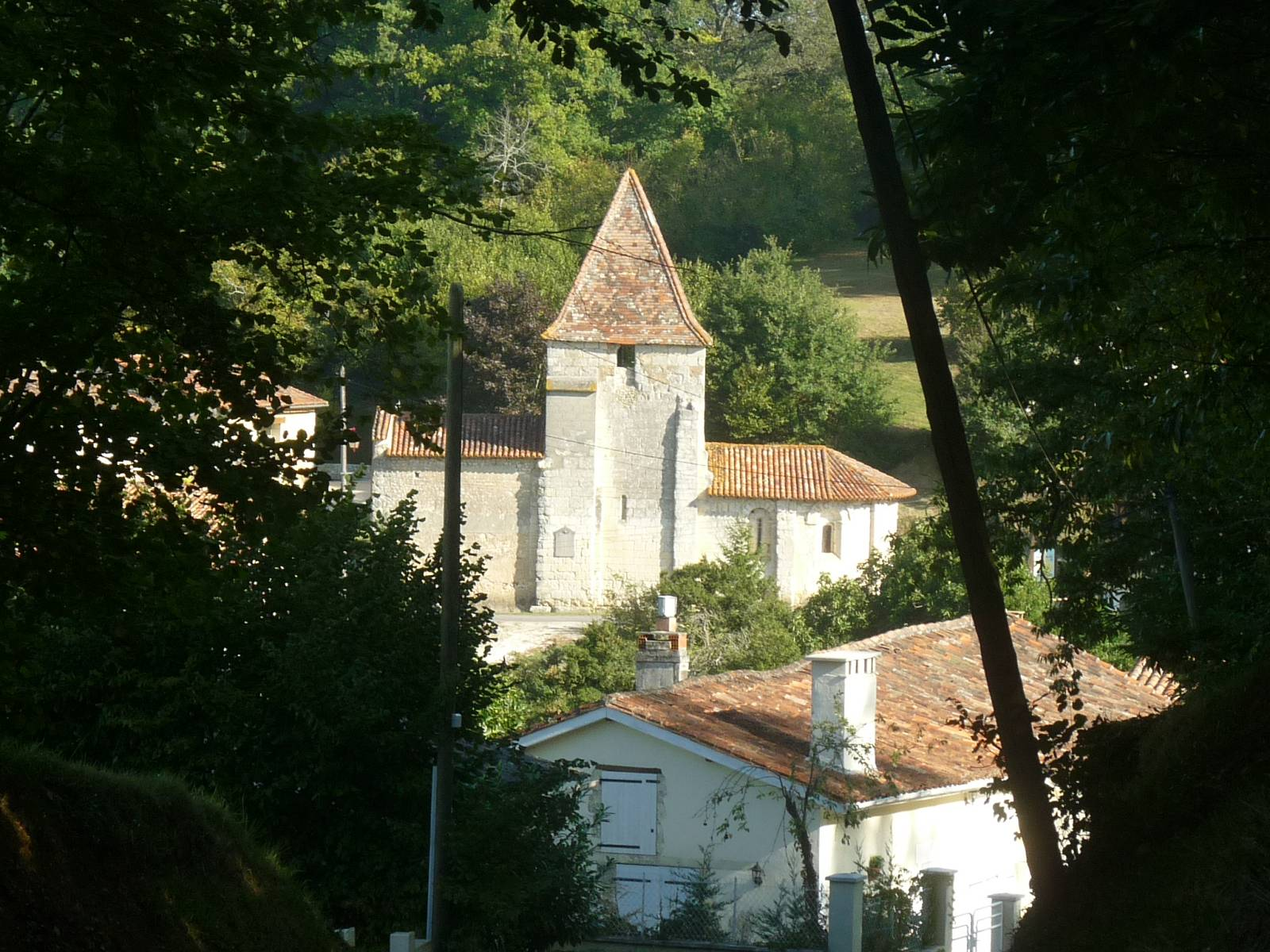
- The church in Saint-Avit
- Location of Saint-Avit
- Location within France Location within Nouvelle-Aquitaine
- Coordinates: 45°14′51″N 0°03′20″E
- Country: France
- Region: Nouvelle-Aquitaine
- Department: Charente
- Arrondissement: Angoulême
- Canton: Tude-et-Lavalette
- Intercommunality: Lavalette Tude Dronne

Government
  - Mayor (2020–2026): Patrick Florent
- Area^{1}: 3.66 km^{2} (1.41 sq mi)
- Elevation: 44 m (144 ft)
- Highest elevation: 128 m (420 ft)
- Lowest elevation: 33 m (108 ft)
- Population (2023): 215
  - Density: 58.7/km^{2} (152/sq mi)
- Time zone: UTC+01:00 (CET)
  - Summer (DST): UTC+02:00 (CEST)
- INSEE/Postal code: 16302 /16210
- ^{1} French Land Register data, which excludes lakes, ponds, glaciers > 1 km^{2} (0.386 sq mi or 247 acres) and river estuaries.

Saint-Avit is a commune in the Charente department in southwestern France.

== Population ==
Historical population
Year	Pop.	±% p.a.
1968	185	—
1975	195	+0.75%
1982	209	+1.00%
1990	194	−0.93%
1999	180	−0.83%
2007	179	−0.07%
2012	193	+1.52%
2017	199	+0.61%
2023	215	+1.30%
Source: INSEE

== See also ==
- Communes of the Charente department
