= Les Essards, Charente =

Les Essards
- Commune
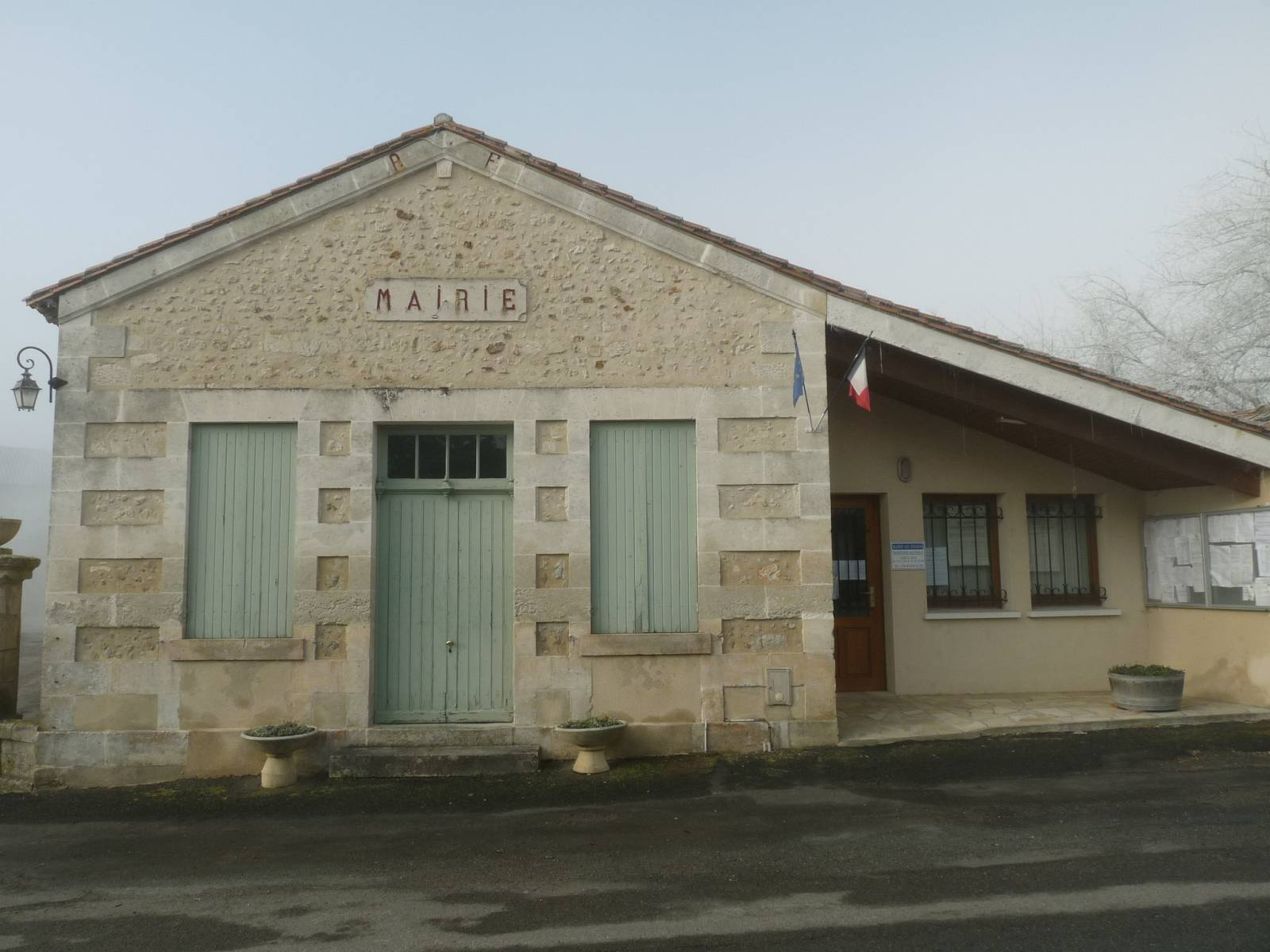
- Town hall
- Location of Les Essards
- Location within France Location within Nouvelle-Aquitaine
- Coordinates: 45°14′27″N 0°07′03″E
- Country: France
- Region: Nouvelle-Aquitaine
- Department: Charente
- Arrondissement: Angoulême
- Canton: Tude-et-Lavalette
- Intercommunality: Lavalette Tude Dronne

Government
  - Mayor (2020–2026): Philippe Adamy
- Area^{1}: 8.98 km^{2} (3.47 sq mi)
- Elevation: 124 m (407 ft)
- Highest elevation: 145 m (476 ft)
- Lowest elevation: 30 m (98 ft)
- Population (2023): 175
  - Density: 19.5/km^{2} (50.5/sq mi)
- Time zone: UTC+01:00 (CET)
  - Summer (DST): UTC+02:00 (CEST)
- INSEE/Postal code: 16130 /16210
- ^{1} French Land Register data, which excludes lakes, ponds, glaciers > 1 km^{2} (0.386 sq mi or 247 acres) and river estuaries.

Les Essards (French pronunciation: [le.z‿ɛsaʁ]; Occitan: Los Eissarts) is a commune in the Charente department in southwestern France.

== Population ==
Historical population
Year	Pop.	±% p.a.
1968	241	—
1975	233	−0.48%
1982	203	−1.95%
1990	193	−0.63%
1999	197	+0.23%
2007	214	+1.04%
2012	196	−1.74%
2017	193	−0.31%
2023	175	−1.62%
Source: INSEE

== See also ==
- Communes of the Charente department
