= Rioux-Martin =

- Commune
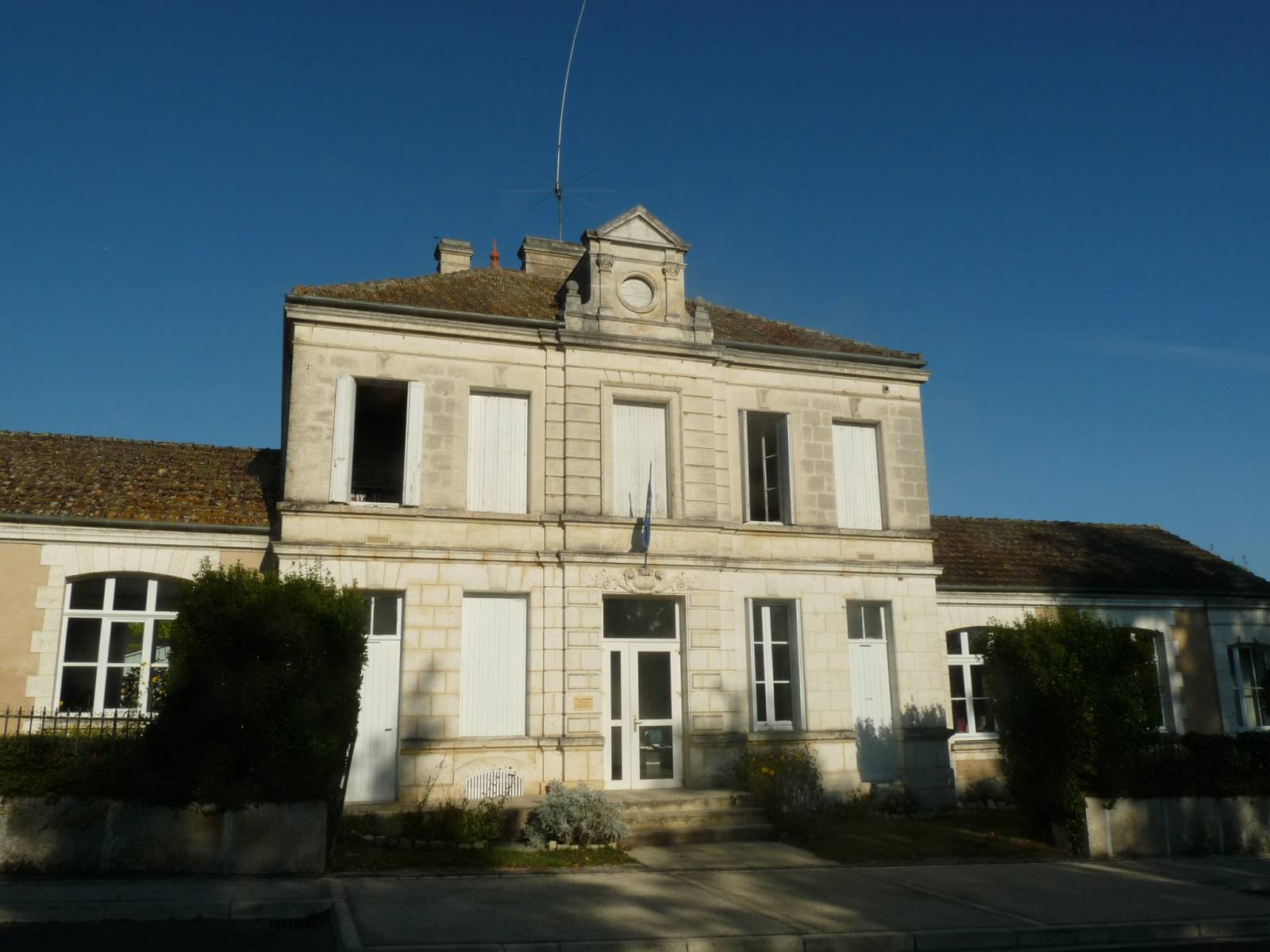
- The town hall in Rioux-Martin
- Location of Rioux-Martin
- Location within France Location within Nouvelle-Aquitaine
- Coordinates: 45°14′52″N 0°00′11″E
- Country: France
- Region: Nouvelle-Aquitaine
- Department: Charente
- Arrondissement: Angoulême
- Canton: Tude-et-Lavalette

Government
  - Mayor (2020–2026): Gaël Pannetier
- Area^{1}: 14.60 km^{2} (5.64 sq mi)
- Elevation: 44 m (144 ft)
- Highest elevation: 131 m (430 ft)
- Lowest elevation: 32 m (105 ft)
- Population (2023): 231
  - Density: 15.8/km^{2} (41.0/sq mi)
- Time zone: UTC+01:00 (CET)
  - Summer (DST): UTC+02:00 (CEST)
- INSEE/Postal code: 16279 /16210
- ^{1} French Land Register data, which excludes lakes, ponds, glaciers > 1 km^{2} (0.386 sq mi or 247 acres) and river estuaries.

Rioux-Martin (French pronunciation: [ʁju maʁtɛ̃]) is a commune in the Charente department in southwestern France.

== Population ==
Historical population
Year	Pop.	±% p.a.
1968	306	—
1975	277	−1.41%
1982	260	−0.90%
1990	211	−2.58%
1999	218	+0.36%
2007	223	+0.28%
2012	235	+1.05%
2017	233	−0.17%
2023	231	−0.14%
Source: INSEE

== Climate ==
Climate data for Rioux-Martin (1991–2020 averages)
Month	Jan	Feb	Mar	Apr	May	Jun	Jul	Aug	Sep	Oct	Nov	Dec	Year
Record high °C (°F)	17.7 (63.9)	24.5 (76.1)	26.1 (79.0)	30.0 (86.0)	33.9 (93.0)	38.5 (101.3)	39.8 (103.6)	41.7 (107.1)	36.3 (97.3)	31.8 (89.2)	24.3 (75.7)	19.4 (66.9)	41.7 (107.1)
Mean daily maximum °C (°F)	9.4 (48.9)	11.1 (52.0)	15.0 (59.0)	17.6 (63.7)	21.4 (70.5)	24.9 (76.8)	27.0 (80.6)	27.4 (81.3)	23.9 (75.0)	19.2 (66.6)	13.3 (55.9)	10.1 (50.2)	18.4 (65.1)
Daily mean °C (°F)	5.9 (42.6)	6.5 (43.7)	9.7 (49.5)	12.0 (53.6)	15.7 (60.3)	19.0 (66.2)	20.7 (69.3)	20.8 (69.4)	17.6 (63.7)	14.1 (57.4)	9.2 (48.6)	6.5 (43.7)	13.1 (55.6)
Mean daily minimum °C (°F)	2.5 (36.5)	2.0 (35.6)	4.4 (39.9)	6.4 (43.5)	10.0 (50.0)	13.0 (55.4)	14.3 (57.7)	14.2 (57.6)	11.3 (52.3)	9.0 (48.2)	5.2 (41.4)	2.9 (37.2)	7.9 (46.2)
Record low °C (°F)	−10.8 (12.6)	−13.6 (7.5)	−10.7 (12.7)	−3.3 (26.1)	−0.2 (31.6)	5.2 (41.4)	6.5 (43.7)	6.1 (43.0)	1.7 (35.1)	−4.3 (24.3)	−8.6 (16.5)	−10.2 (13.6)	−13.6 (7.5)
Average precipitation mm (inches)	78.5 (3.09)	61.4 (2.42)	58.5 (2.30)	74.4 (2.93)	64.6 (2.54)	65.4 (2.57)	49.8 (1.96)	60.6 (2.39)	69.5 (2.74)	73.0 (2.87)	90.6 (3.57)	90.8 (3.57)	837.1 (32.96)
Average precipitation days (≥ 1.0 mm)	12.0	10.0	10.4	11.7	10.2	8.1	7.3	8.0	9.0	11.1	12.7	12.2	122.7
Mean monthly sunshine hours	81.6	126.1	172.5	194.0	222.1	254.8	270.1	248.0	214.3	148.7	101.8	89.8	2,123.7
Source: Meteociel

== See also ==
- Communes of the Charente department
