= Deviat =

- Commune
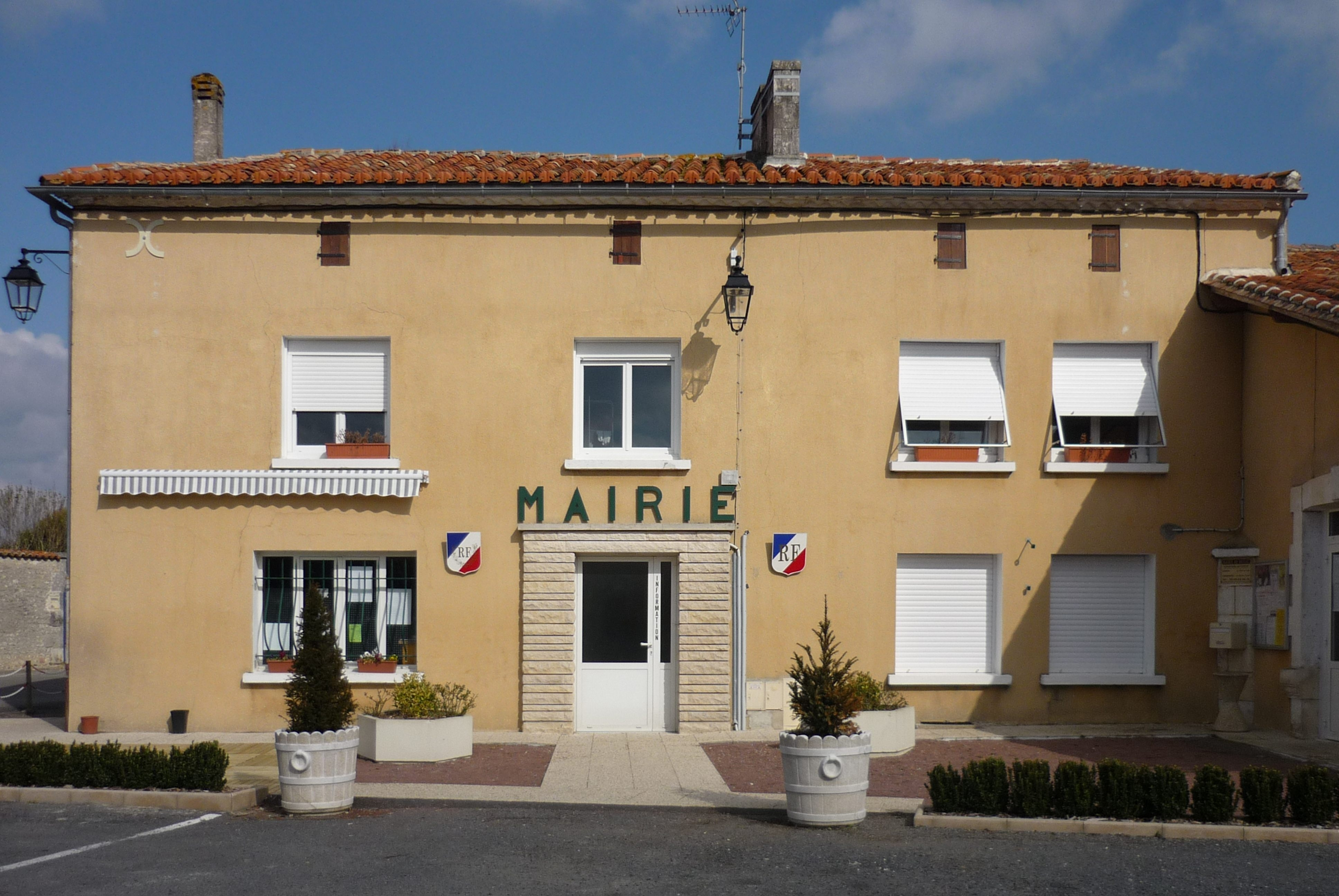
- Town hall
- Location of Deviat
- Location within France Location within Nouvelle-Aquitaine
- Coordinates: 45°25′07″N 0°00′35″E
- Country: France
- Region: Nouvelle-Aquitaine
- Department: Charente
- Arrondissement: Angoulême
- Canton: Tude-et-Lavalette

Government
  - Mayor (2020–2026): Jean-François Servant
- Area^{1}: 8.42 km^{2} (3.25 sq mi)
- Elevation: 135 m (443 ft)
- Highest elevation: 167 m (548 ft)
- Lowest elevation: 74 m (243 ft)
- Population (2023): 135
  - Density: 16.0/km^{2} (41.5/sq mi)
- Time zone: UTC+01:00 (CET)
  - Summer (DST): UTC+02:00 (CEST)
- INSEE/Postal code: 16118 /16190
- ^{1} French Land Register data, which excludes lakes, ponds, glaciers > 1 km^{2} (0.386 sq mi or 247 acres) and river estuaries.

Deviat (French pronunciation: [dəvja]) is a commune in the Charente department in southwestern France.

== Population ==
Historical population
Year	Pop.	±% p.a.
1968	257	—
1975	230	−1.57%
1982	180	−3.44%
1990	156	−1.77%
1999	158	+0.14%
2007	165	+0.54%
2012	155	−1.24%
2017	143	−1.60%
2023	135	−0.95%
Source: INSEE

== See also ==
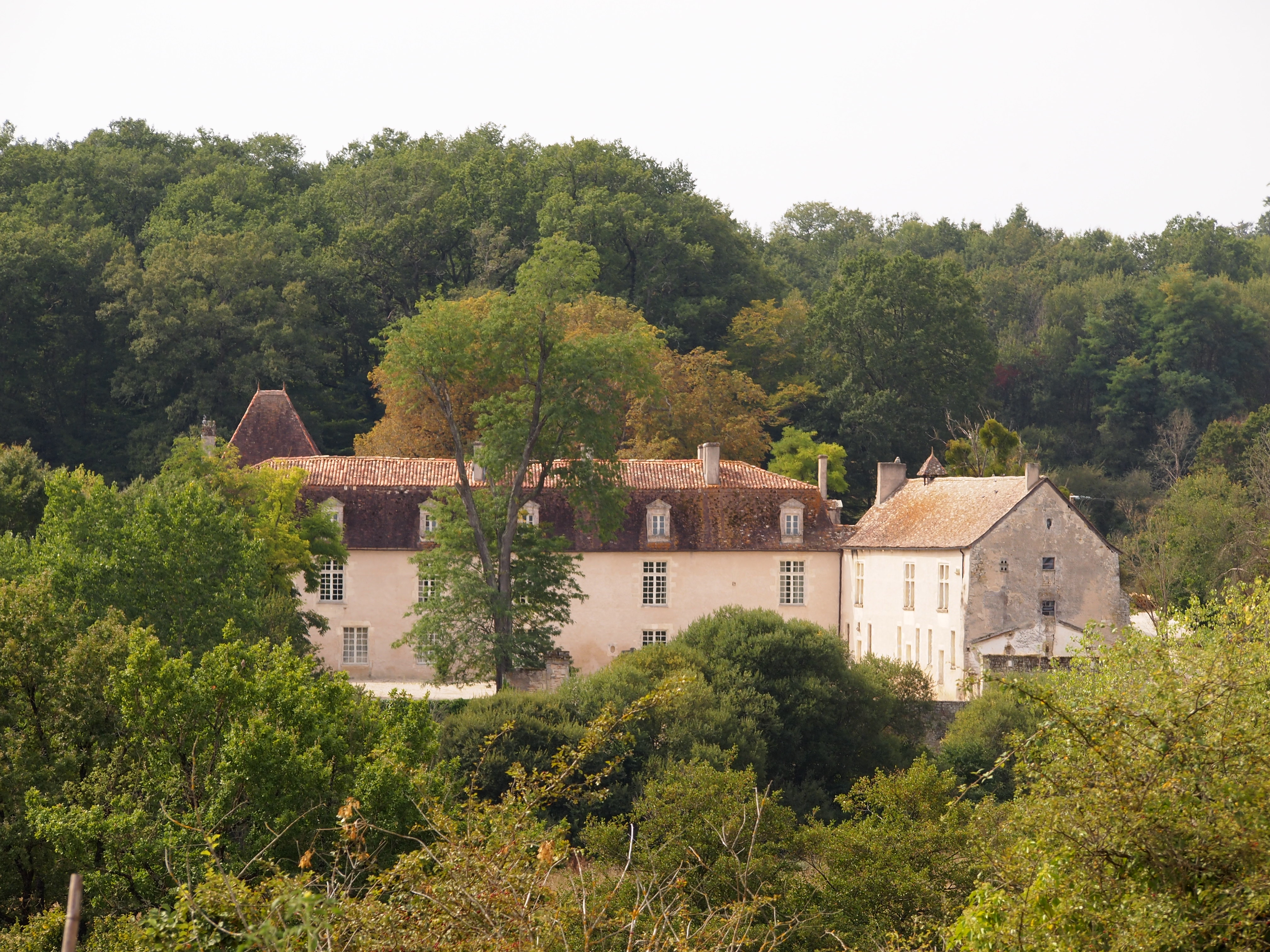
Château de la Faye

*Communes of the Charente department
