= Juignac =

- Commune
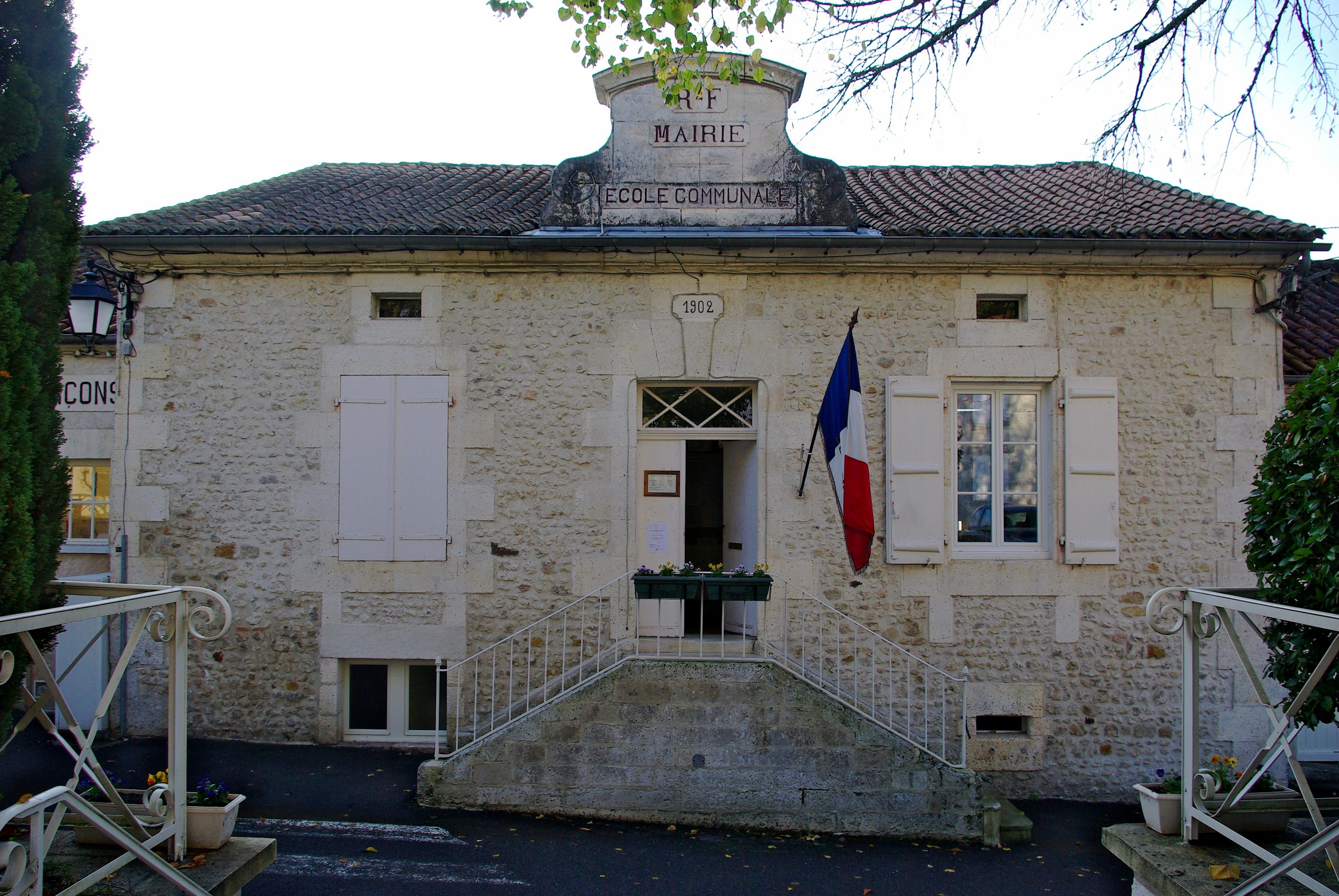
- Town hall
- Location of Juignac
- Location within France Location within Nouvelle-Aquitaine
- Coordinates: 45°22′44″N 0°09′52″E
- Country: France
- Region: Nouvelle-Aquitaine
- Department: Charente
- Arrondissement: Angoulême
- Canton: Tude-et-Lavalette

Government
  - Mayor (2020–2026): Alain Delaunay
- Area^{1}: 24.18 km^{2} (9.34 sq mi)
- Elevation: 126 m (413 ft)
- Highest elevation: 191 m (627 ft)
- Lowest elevation: 61 m (200 ft)
- Population (2023): 388
  - Density: 16.0/km^{2} (41.6/sq mi)
- Time zone: UTC+01:00 (CET)
  - Summer (DST): UTC+02:00 (CEST)
- INSEE/Postal code: 16170 /16190
- ^{1} French Land Register data, which excludes lakes, ponds, glaciers > 1 km^{2} (0.386 sq mi or 247 acres) and river estuaries.

Juignac (French pronunciation: [ʒɥiɲak]; Occitan: Junhac) is a commune in the Charente department in southwestern France.

== Population ==
Historical population
Year	Pop.	±% p.a.
1968	613	—
1975	560	−1.28%
1982	517	−1.13%
1990	466	−1.29%
1999	438	−0.69%
2007	419	−0.55%
2012	393	−1.27%
2017	408	+0.75%
2023	388	−0.83%
Source: INSEE

== See also ==
- Communes of the Charente department
