= Montignac-le-Coq =

- Commune
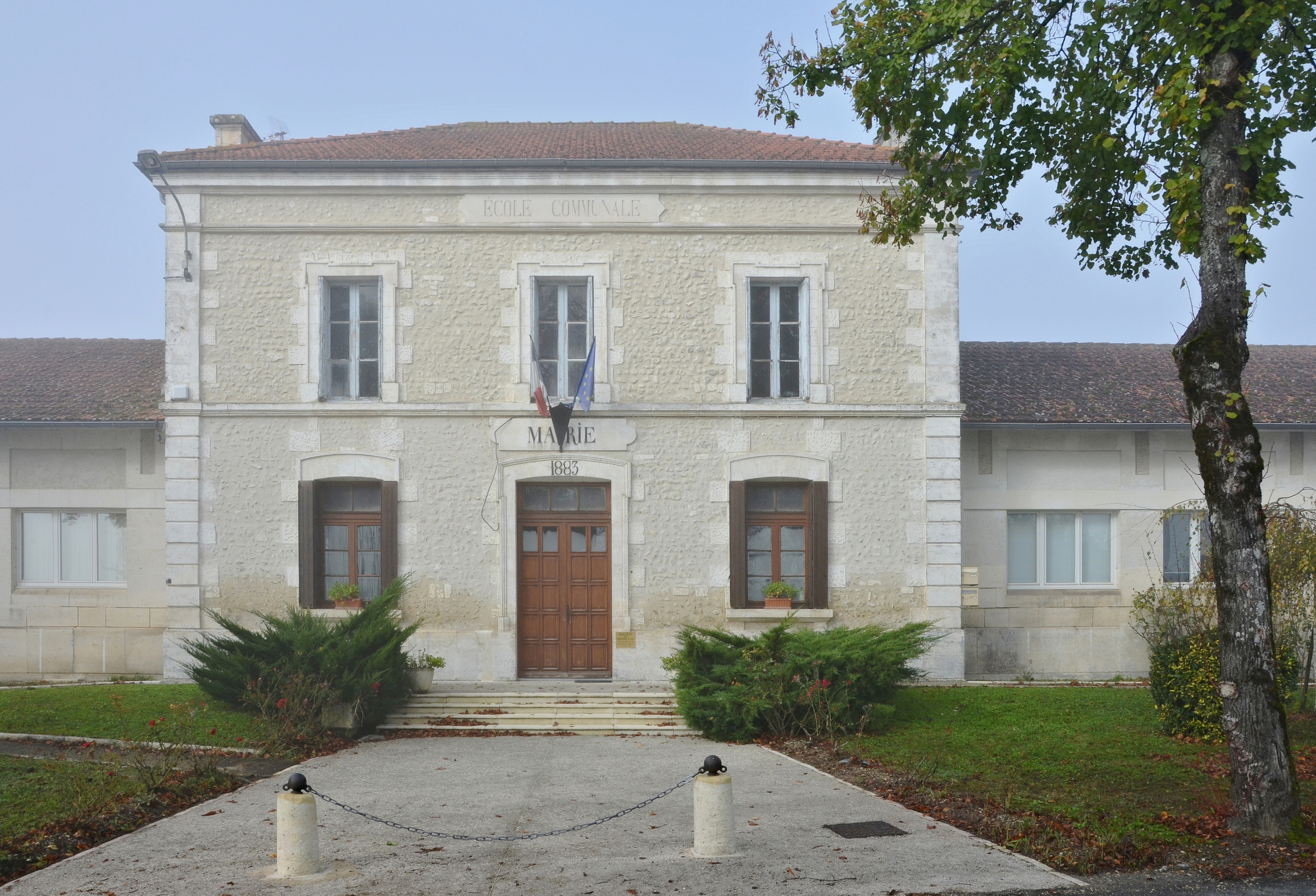
- The town hall in Montignac-le-Coq
- Location of Montignac-le-Coq
- Location within France Location within Nouvelle-Aquitaine
- Coordinates: 45°20′15″N 0°13′26″E
- Country: France
- Region: Nouvelle-Aquitaine
- Department: Charente
- Arrondissement: Angoulême
- Canton: Tude-et-Lavalette

Government
  - Mayor (2020–2026): Alain Désert
- Area^{1}: 10.2 km^{2} (3.9 sq mi)
- Elevation: 130 m (430 ft)
- Highest elevation: 191 m (627 ft)
- Lowest elevation: 62 m (203 ft)
- Population (2023): 130
  - Density: 13/km^{2} (33/sq mi)
- Time zone: UTC+01:00 (CET)
  - Summer (DST): UTC+02:00 (CEST)
- INSEE/Postal code: 16227 /16390
- ^{1} French Land Register data, which excludes lakes, ponds, glaciers > 1 km^{2} (0.386 sq mi or 247 acres) and river estuaries.

Montignac-le-Coq (French pronunciation: [mɔ̃tiɲak lə kɔk]; Occitan: Montinhac) is a commune in the Charente department in southwestern France.

== Population ==
Historical population
Year	Pop.	±% p.a.
1968	251	—
1975	224	−1.61%
1982	209	−0.99%
1990	162	−3.13%
1999	150	−0.85%
2007	137	−1.13%
2012	131	−0.89%
2017	138	+1.05%
2023	130	−0.99%
Source: INSEE

== See also ==
- Communes of the Charente department
