= Curac =

- Commune
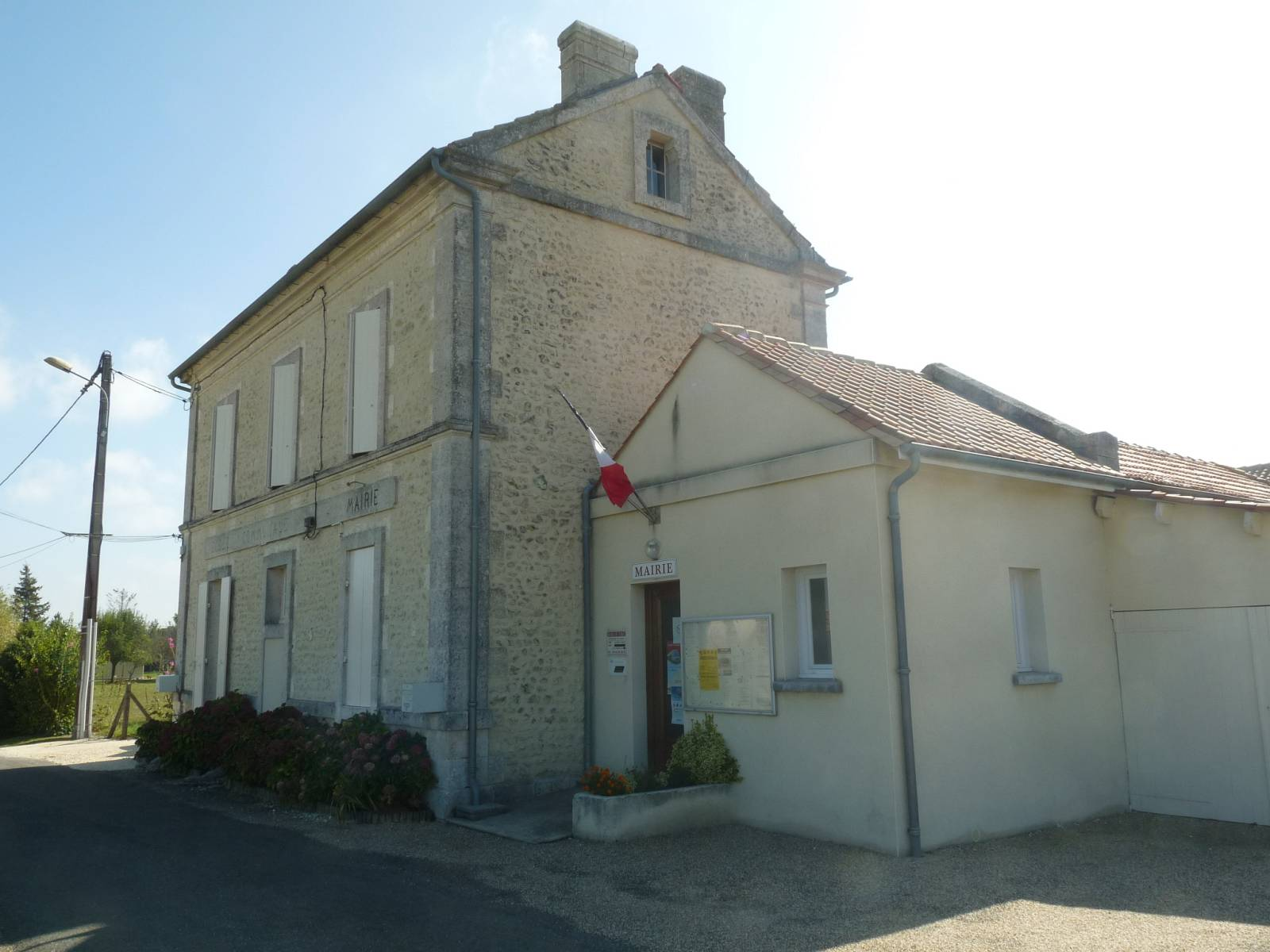
- The town hall in Curac
- Location of Curac
- Location within France Location within Nouvelle-Aquitaine
- Coordinates: 45°17′43″N 0°01′36″E
- Country: France
- Region: Nouvelle-Aquitaine
- Department: Charente
- Arrondissement: Angoulême
- Canton: Tude-et-Lavalette
- Intercommunality: Lavalette Tude Dronne

Government
  - Mayor (2020–2026): Monique Sébillaud
- Area^{1}: 4.92 km^{2} (1.90 sq mi)
- Elevation: 92 m (302 ft)
- Highest elevation: 127 m (417 ft)
- Lowest elevation: 47 m (154 ft)
- Population (2023): 113
  - Density: 23.0/km^{2} (59.5/sq mi)
- Time zone: UTC+01:00 (CET)
  - Summer (DST): UTC+02:00 (CEST)
- INSEE/Postal code: 16117 /16210
- ^{1} French Land Register data, which excludes lakes, ponds, glaciers > 1 km^{2} (0.386 sq mi or 247 acres) and river estuaries.

Curac (French pronunciation: [kyʁak]) is a commune in the Charente department in southwestern France.

== Population ==
Historical population
Year	Pop.	±% p.a.
1968	159	—
1975	135	−2.31%
1982	118	−1.90%
1990	112	−0.65%
1999	110	−0.20%
2007	120	+1.09%
2012	123	+0.50%
2017	125	+0.32%
2023	113	−1.67%
Source: INSEE

== See also ==
- Communes of the Charente department
