= Bellon, Charente =

Bellon
- Commune
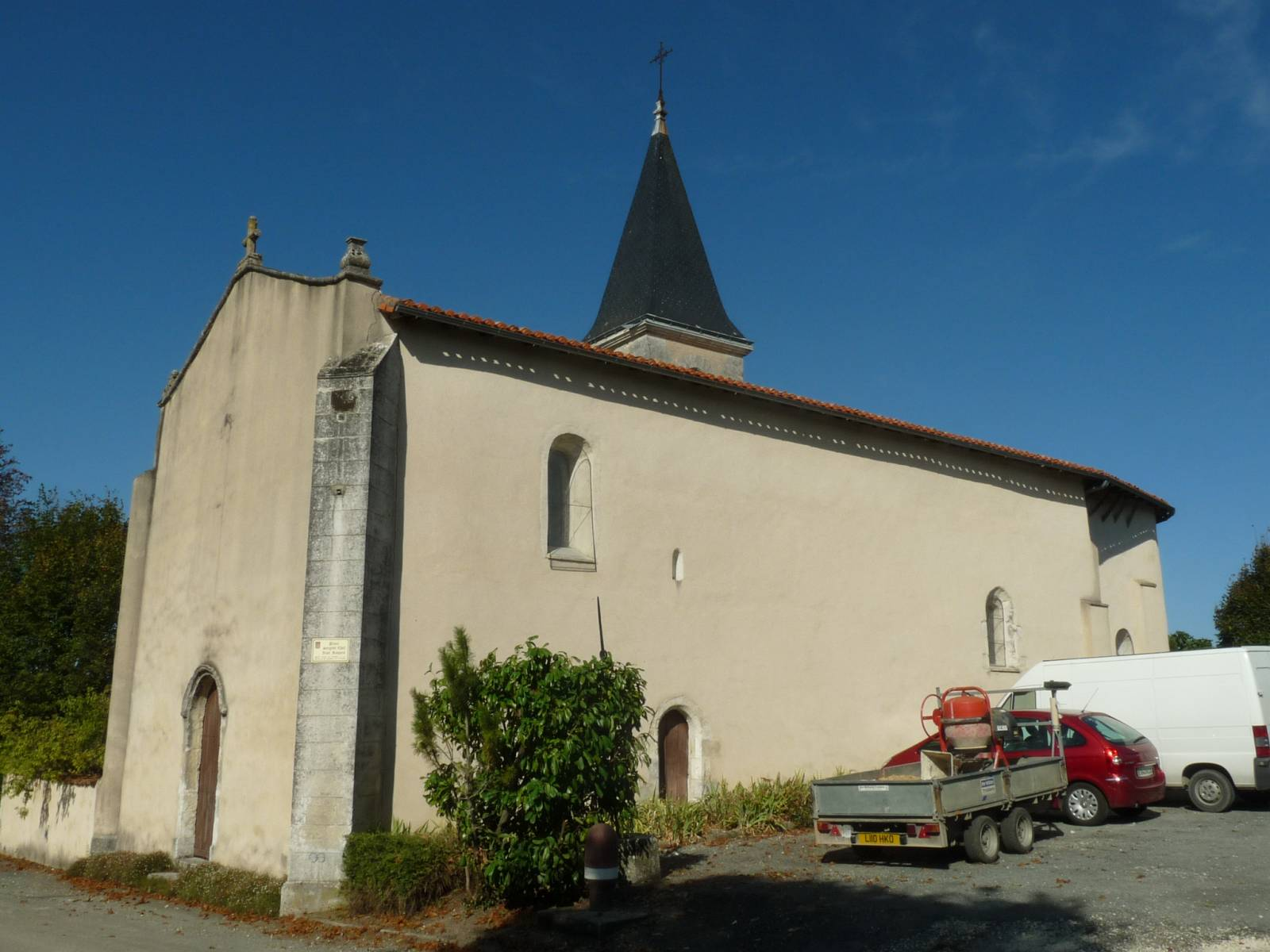
- The church in Bellon

- Coat of arms
- Location of Bellon
- Location within France Location within Nouvelle-Aquitaine
- Coordinates: 45°18′13″N 0°07′13″E
- Country: France
- Region: Nouvelle-Aquitaine
- Department: Charente
- Arrondissement: Angoulême
- Canton: Tude-et-Lavalette
- Intercommunality: Lavalette Tude Dronne

Government
  - Mayor (2020–2026): Philippe Vigier
- Area^{1}: 9.13 km^{2} (3.53 sq mi)
- Elevation: 80 m (260 ft)
- Highest elevation: 124 m (407 ft)
- Lowest elevation: 53 m (174 ft)
- Population (2023): 145
  - Density: 15.9/km^{2} (41.1/sq mi)
- Time zone: UTC+01:00 (CET)
  - Summer (DST): UTC+02:00 (CEST)
- INSEE/Postal code: 16037 /16210
- ^{1} French Land Register data, which excludes lakes, ponds, glaciers > 1 km^{2} (0.386 sq mi or 247 acres) and river estuaries.

Bellon (French pronunciation: [belɔ̃]) is a commune in the Charente department in southwestern France.

== Population ==
Historical population
Year	Pop.	±% p.a.
1968	176	—
1975	157	−1.62%
1982	179	+1.89%
1990	156	−1.70%
1999	152	−0.29%
2007	180	+2.14%
2012	163	−1.96%
2017	156	−0.87%
2023	145	−1.21%
Source: INSEE

== See also ==
- Communes of the Charente department
