= Bessac =

- Commune
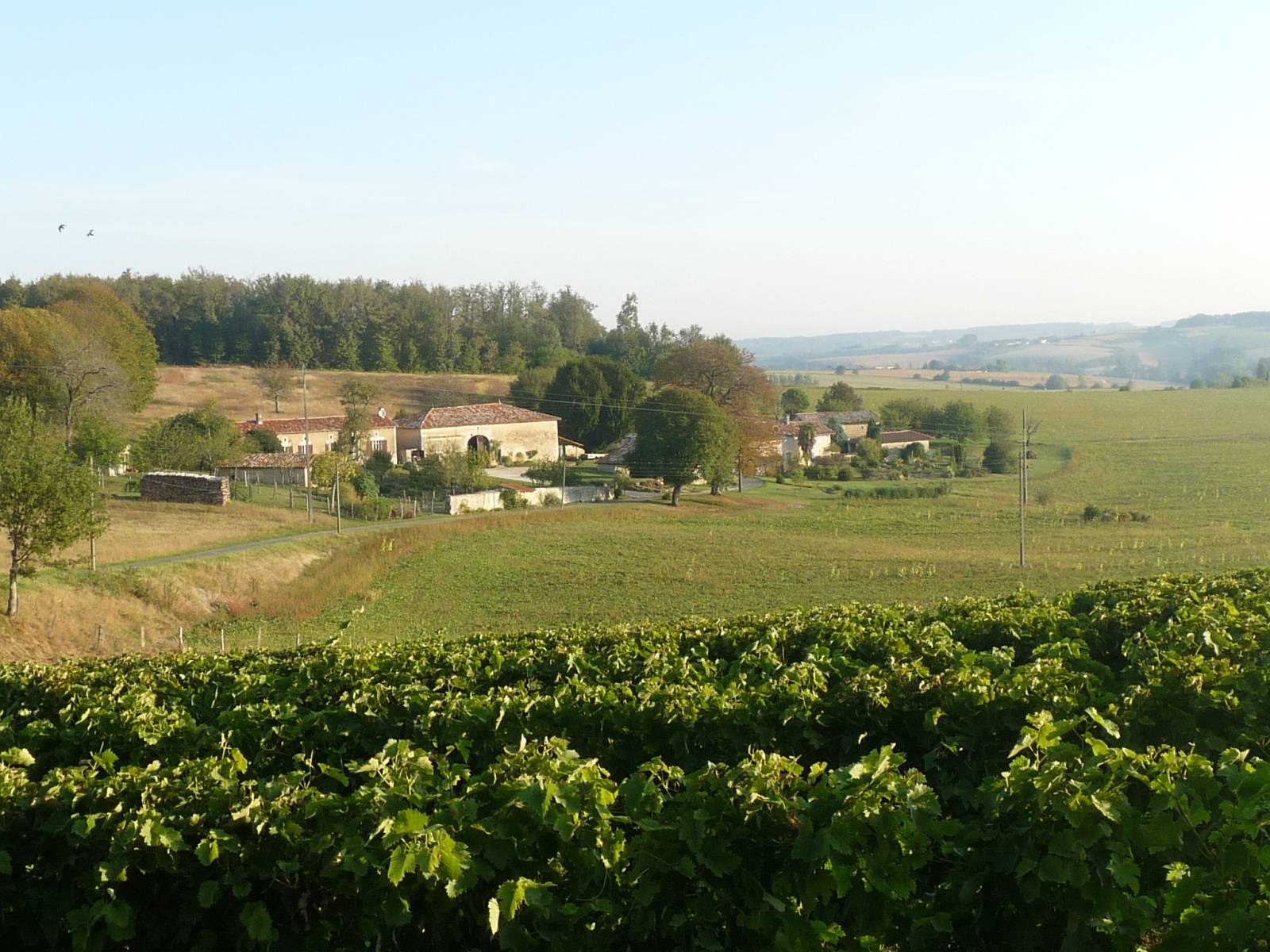
- A general view of Bessac
- Location of Bessac
- Location within France Location within Nouvelle-Aquitaine
- Coordinates: 45°25′51″N 0°01′05″W
- Country: France
- Region: Nouvelle-Aquitaine
- Department: Charente
- Arrondissement: Angoulême
- Canton: Tude-et-Lavalette

Government
  - Mayor (2020–2026): Jean-Claude Chevalier
- Area^{1}: 10.55 km^{2} (4.07 sq mi)
- Elevation: 10 m (33 ft)
- Highest elevation: 162 m (531 ft)
- Lowest elevation: 62 m (203 ft)
- Population (2023): 122
  - Density: 11.6/km^{2} (30.0/sq mi)
- Time zone: UTC+01:00 (CET)
  - Summer (DST): UTC+02:00 (CEST)
- INSEE/Postal code: 16041 /16250
- ^{1} French Land Register data, which excludes lakes, ponds, glaciers > 1 km^{2} (0.386 sq mi or 247 acres) and river estuaries.

Bessac (French pronunciation: [bɛsak]) is a commune in the Charente department in southwestern France.

== Population ==
Historical population
Year	Pop.	±% p.a.
1968	189	—
1975	152	−3.06%
1982	147	−0.48%
1990	139	−0.70%
1999	131	−0.66%
2007	127	−0.39%
2012	123	−0.64%
2017	107	−2.75%
2023	122	+2.21%
Source: INSEE

== See also ==
- Communes of the Charente department
