= Saint-Quentin-de-Chalais =

- Commune
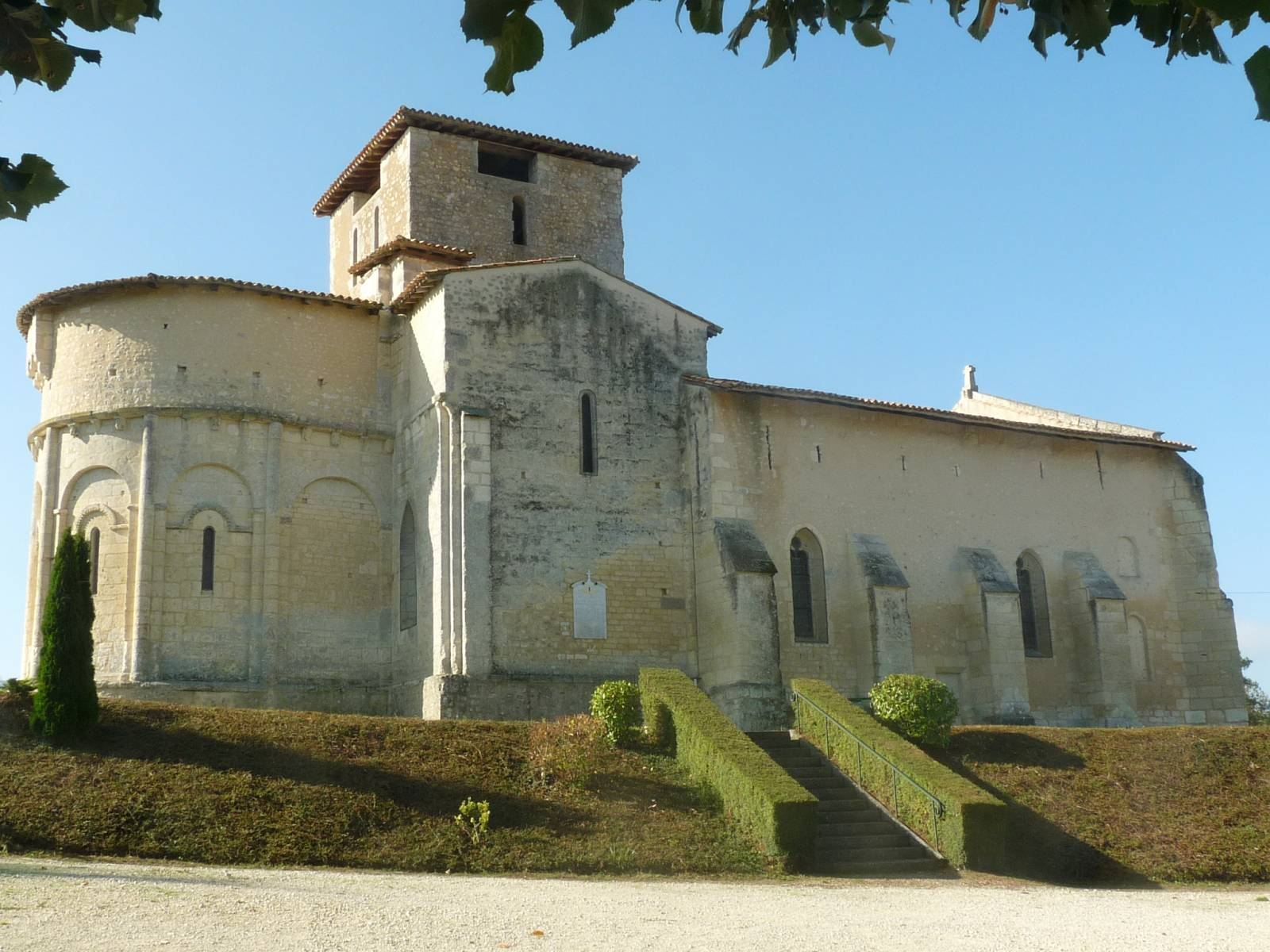
- The church in Saint-Quentin-de-Chalais
- Location of Saint-Quentin-de-Chalais
- Location within France Location within Nouvelle-Aquitaine
- Coordinates: 45°15′32″N 0°04′08″E
- Country: France
- Region: Nouvelle-Aquitaine
- Department: Charente
- Arrondissement: Angoulême
- Canton: Tude-et-Lavalette

Government
  - Mayor (2020–2026): Joël Papillaud
- Area^{1}: 12.38 km^{2} (4.78 sq mi)
- Elevation: 111 m (364 ft)
- Highest elevation: 146 m (479 ft)
- Lowest elevation: 27 m (89 ft)
- Population (2023): 241
  - Density: 19.5/km^{2} (50.4/sq mi)
- Time zone: UTC+01:00 (CET)
  - Summer (DST): UTC+02:00 (CEST)
- INSEE/Postal code: 16346 /16210
- ^{1} French Land Register data, which excludes lakes, ponds, glaciers > 1 km^{2} (0.386 sq mi or 247 acres) and river estuaries.

Saint-Quentin-de-Chalais (French pronunciation: [sɛ̃ kɑ̃tɛ̃ də ʃalɛ], literally Saint-Quentin of Chalais) is a commune in the Charente department in southwestern France, located 5 km (3 mi) southeast of Chalais and 44 km (27 mi) south of Angoulême in the Nouvelle-Aquitaine region.

== Population ==
Historical population
Year	Pop.	±% p.a.
1968	259	—
1975	230	−1.68%
1982	219	−0.70%
1990	243	+1.31%
1999	250	+0.32%
2007	272	+1.06%
2012	274	+0.15%
2017	255	−1.43%
2023	241	−0.94%
Source: INSEE

== Notable residents ==
- Pierre Papillaud, French billionaire businessman.

== See also ==
- Communes of the Charente department
