= Orival, Charente =

Orival
- Commune
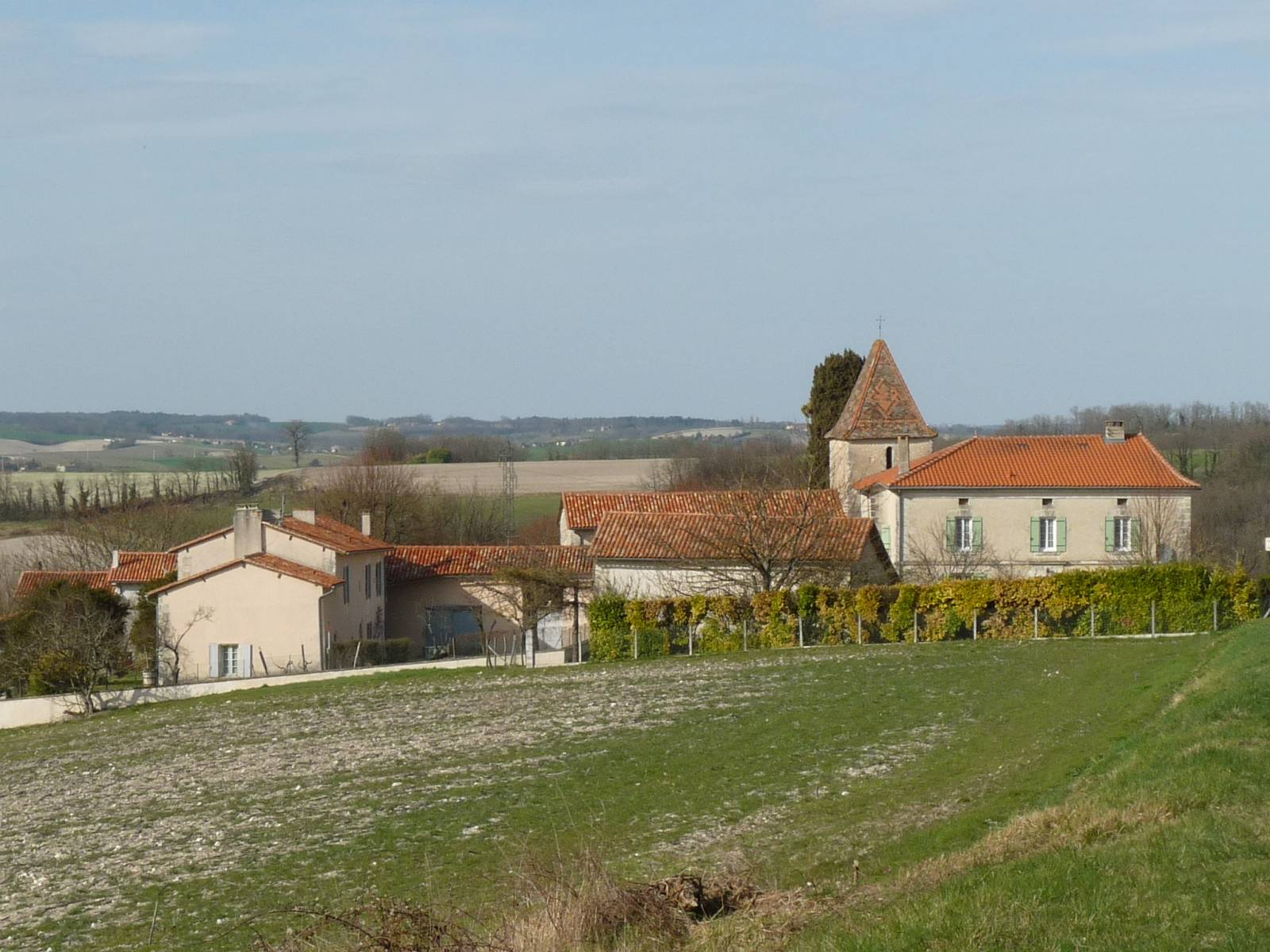
- A general view of Orival
- Location of Orival
- Location within France Location within Nouvelle-Aquitaine
- Coordinates: 45°16′40″N 0°04′21″E
- Country: France
- Region: Nouvelle-Aquitaine
- Department: Charente
- Arrondissement: Angoulême
- Canton: Tude-et-Lavalette
- Intercommunality: Lavalette Tude Dronne

Government
  - Mayor (2020–2026): Pauline Dumas
- Area^{1}: 5.43 km^{2} (2.10 sq mi)
- Elevation: 90 m (300 ft)
- Highest elevation: 154 m (505 ft)
- Lowest elevation: 45 m (148 ft)
- Population (2023): 149
  - Density: 27.4/km^{2} (71.1/sq mi)
- Time zone: UTC+01:00 (CET)
  - Summer (DST): UTC+02:00 (CEST)
- INSEE/Postal code: 16252 /16210
- ^{1} French Land Register data, which excludes lakes, ponds, glaciers > 1 km^{2} (0.386 sq mi or 247 acres) and river estuaries.

Orival (French pronunciation: [ɔʁival]) is a commune in the Charente department in southwestern France.

== Population ==
Historical population
Year	Pop.	±% p.a.
1968	123	—
1975	143	+2.18%
1982	173	+2.76%
1990	177	+0.29%
1999	153	−1.61%
2007	159	+0.48%
2012	155	−0.51%
2017	154	−0.13%
2023	149	−0.55%
Source: INSEE

== See also ==
- Communes of the Charente department
