= Rougnac =

- Commune
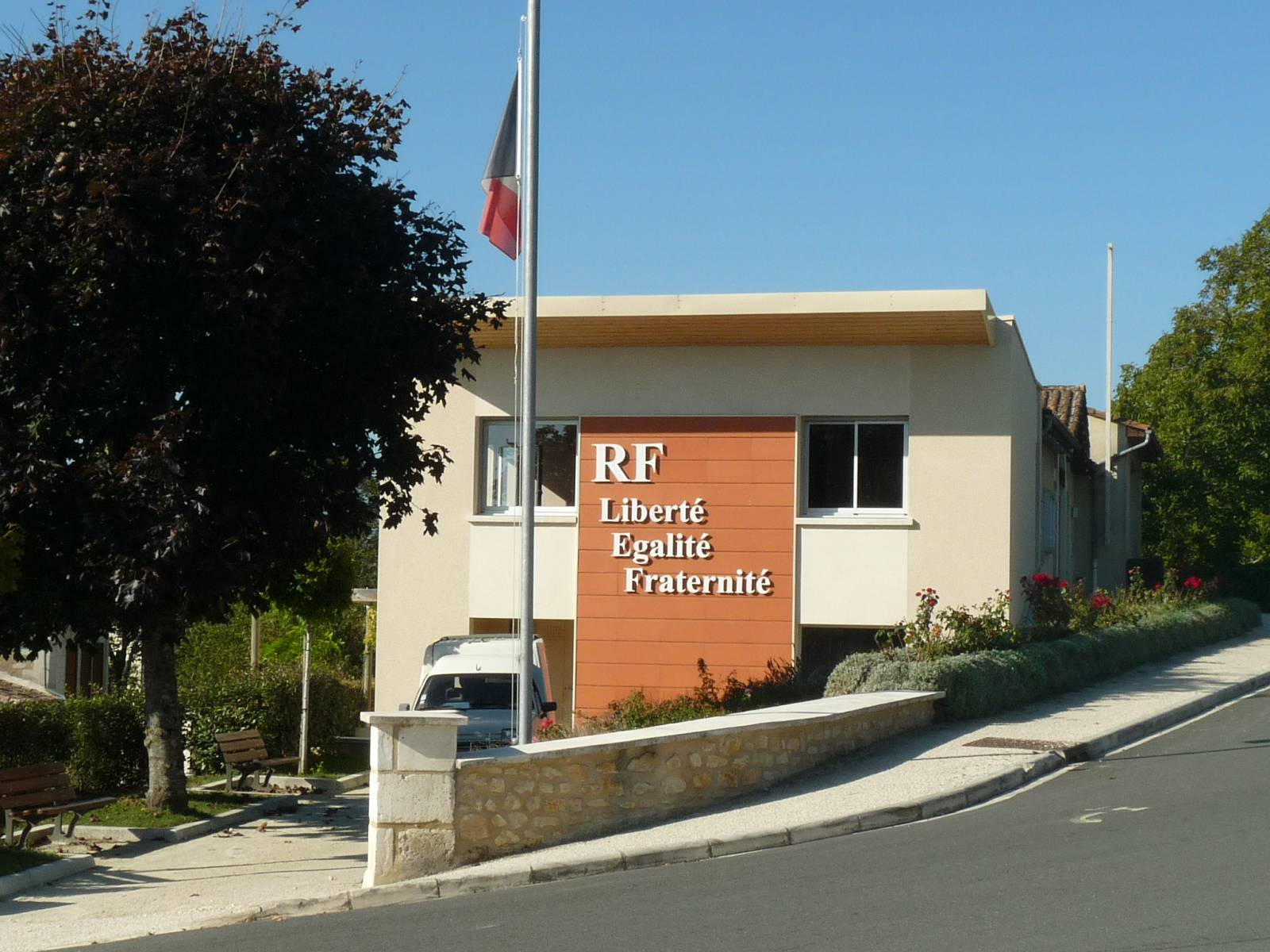
- Town hall
- Location of Rougnac
- Location within France Location within Nouvelle-Aquitaine
- Coordinates: 45°32′13″N 0°21′33″E
- Country: France
- Region: Nouvelle-Aquitaine
- Department: Charente
- Arrondissement: Angoulême
- Canton: Tude-et-Lavalette

Government
  - Mayor (2020–2026): Cyrille Guedon
- Area^{1}: 29.88 km^{2} (11.54 sq mi)
- Elevation: 134 m (440 ft)
- Highest elevation: 221 m (725 ft)
- Lowest elevation: 105 m (344 ft)
- Population (2023): 395
  - Density: 13.2/km^{2} (34.2/sq mi)
- Time zone: UTC+01:00 (CET)
  - Summer (DST): UTC+02:00 (CEST)
- INSEE/Postal code: 16285 /16320
- ^{1} French Land Register data, which excludes lakes, ponds, glaciers > 1 km^{2} (0.386 sq mi or 247 acres) and river estuaries.

Rougnac (French pronunciation: [ʁuɲak]; Occitan: Ronhac) is a commune in the Charente department in southwestern France.

== Population ==
Historical population
Year	Pop.	±% p.a.
1968	392	—
1975	370	−0.82%
1982	437	+2.41%
1990	529	+2.42%
1999	547	+0.37%
2007	522	−0.58%
2012	416	−4.44%
2017	407	−0.44%
2023	395	−0.50%
Source: INSEE

== See also ==
- Communes of the Charente department
