= Fouquebrune =

- Commune
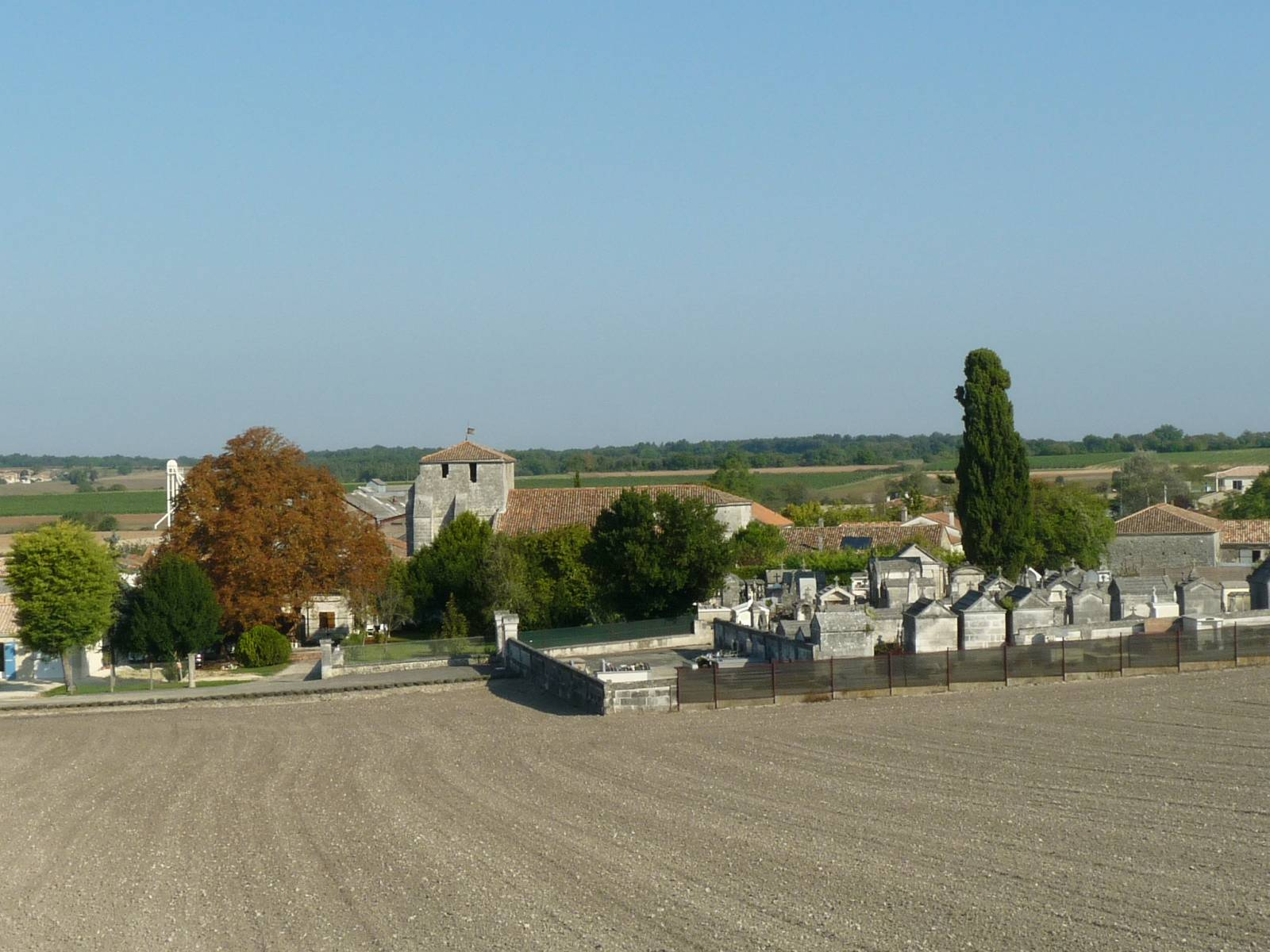
- A general view of Fouquebrune
- Location of Fouquebrune
- Location within France Location within Nouvelle-Aquitaine
- Coordinates: 45°31′44″N 0°12′42″E
- Country: France
- Region: Nouvelle-Aquitaine
- Department: Charente
- Arrondissement: Angoulême
- Canton: Tude-et-Lavalette

Government
  - Mayor (2020–2026): Chantale Goreau
- Area^{1}: 28.85 km^{2} (11.14 sq mi)
- Elevation: 147 m (482 ft)
- Highest elevation: 207 m (679 ft)
- Lowest elevation: 87 m (285 ft)
- Population (2023): 714
  - Density: 24.7/km^{2} (64.1/sq mi)
- Time zone: UTC+01:00 (CET)
  - Summer (DST): UTC+02:00 (CEST)
- INSEE/Postal code: 16143 /16410
- ^{1} French Land Register data, which excludes lakes, ponds, glaciers > 1 km^{2} (0.386 sq mi or 247 acres) and river estuaries.

Fouquebrune (French pronunciation: [fuk.bʁyn]) is a commune in the Charente department in southwestern France.

== Population ==
Historical population
Year	Pop.	±% p.a.
1968	450	—
1975	457	+0.22%
1982	573	+3.28%
1990	670	+1.97%
1999	634	−0.61%
2007	652	+0.35%
2012	662	+0.30%
2017	682	+0.60%
2023	714	+0.77%
Source: INSEE

== See also ==
- Communes of the Charente department
