= Rouffiac, Charente =

Rouffiac
- Commune
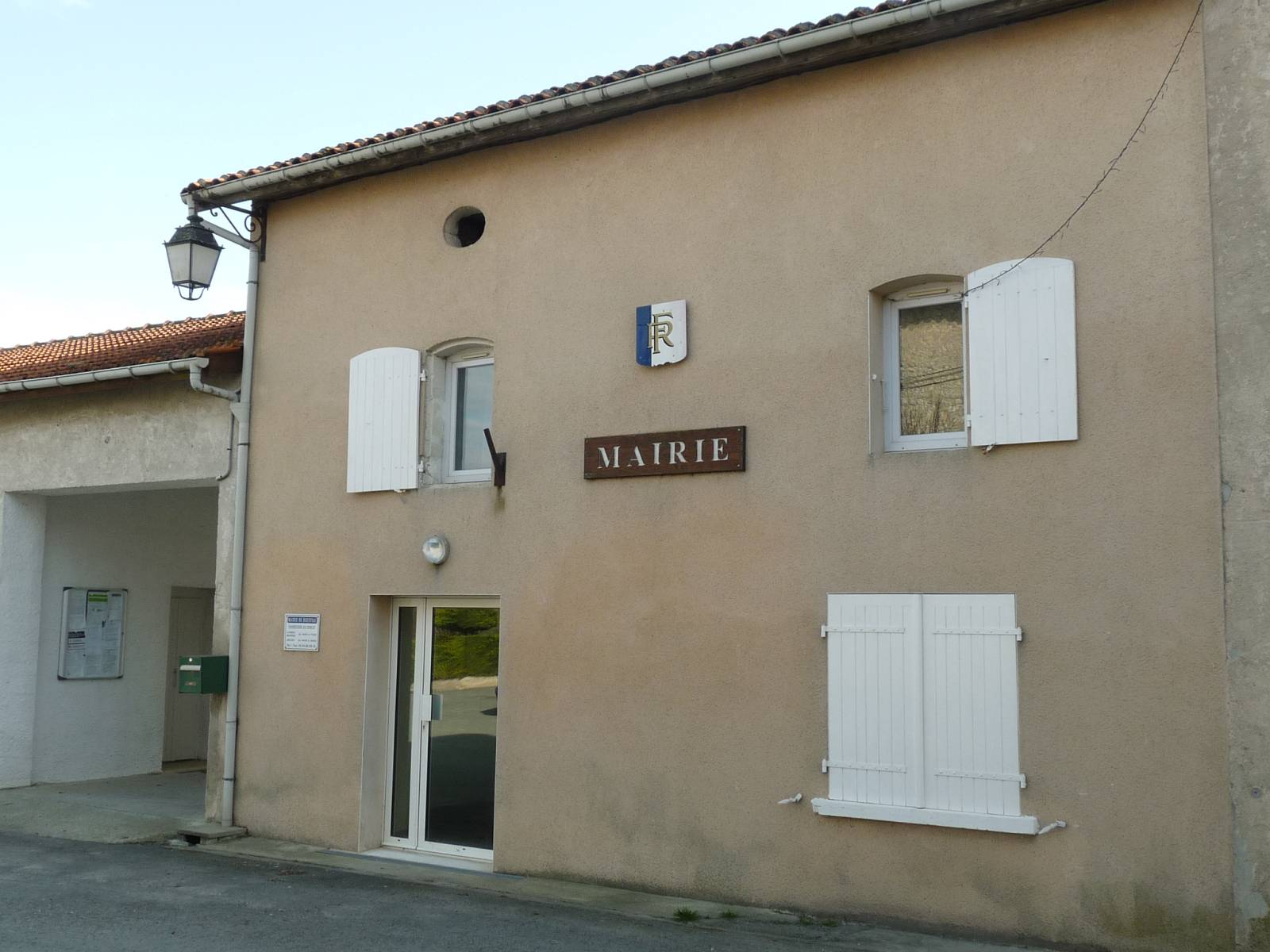
- The town hall in Rouffiac
- Location of Rouffiac
- Location within France Location within Nouvelle-Aquitaine
- Coordinates: 45°16′10″N 0°04′57″E
- Country: France
- Region: Nouvelle-Aquitaine
- Department: Charente
- Arrondissement: Angoulême
- Canton: Tude-et-Lavalette
- Intercommunality: Lavalette Tude Dronne

Government
  - Mayor (2020–2026): Éric Rocher
- Area^{1}: 9.89 km^{2} (3.82 sq mi)
- Elevation: 156 m (512 ft)
- Highest elevation: 170 m (560 ft)
- Lowest elevation: 45 m (148 ft)
- Population (2023): 117
  - Density: 11.8/km^{2} (30.6/sq mi)
- Time zone: UTC+01:00 (CET)
  - Summer (DST): UTC+02:00 (CEST)
- INSEE/Postal code: 16284 /16210
- ^{1} French Land Register data, which excludes lakes, ponds, glaciers > 1 km^{2} (0.386 sq mi or 247 acres) and river estuaries.

Rouffiac (French pronunciation: [ʁufjak]) is a commune in the Charente department in southwestern France.

== Population ==
Historical population
Year	Pop.	±% p.a.
1968	159	—
1975	156	−0.27%
1982	131	−2.46%
1990	106	−2.61%
1999	114	+0.81%
2007	114	+0.00%
2012	120	+1.03%
2017	122	+0.33%
2023	117	−0.70%
Source: INSEE

== See also ==
- Communes of the Charente department
