= Saint-Laurent-des-Combes, Charente =

Saint-Laurent-des-Combes
- Commune
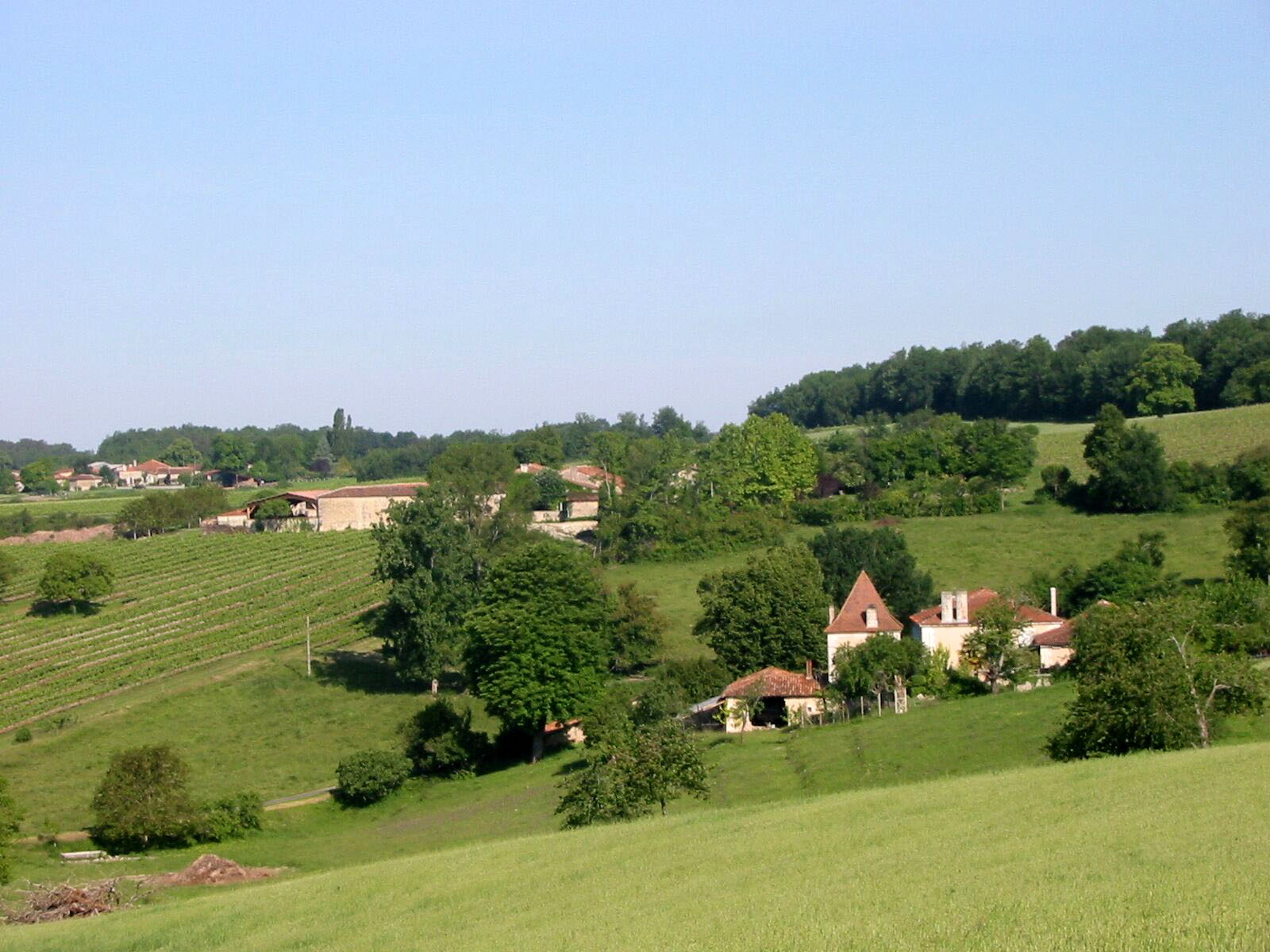
- A general view of Saint-Laurent-des-Combes

- Coat of arms
- Location of Saint-Laurent-des-Combes
- Location within France Location within Nouvelle-Aquitaine
- Coordinates: 45°21′23″N 0°02′14″E
- Country: France
- Region: Nouvelle-Aquitaine
- Department: Charente
- Arrondissement: Angoulême
- Canton: Tude-et-Lavalette

Government
  - Mayor (2020–2026): Christophe Damour
- Area^{1}: 7.67 km^{2} (2.96 sq mi)
- Elevation: 128 m (420 ft)
- Highest elevation: 174 m (571 ft)
- Lowest elevation: 74 m (243 ft)
- Population (2023): 97
  - Density: 13/km^{2} (33/sq mi)
- Time zone: UTC+01:00 (CET)
  - Summer (DST): UTC+02:00 (CEST)
- INSEE/Postal code: 16331 /16480
- ^{1} French Land Register data, which excludes lakes, ponds, glaciers > 1 km^{2} (0.386 sq mi or 247 acres) and river estuaries.

Saint-Laurent-des-Combes is a commune in the Charente department in southwestern France.

== Population ==
Historical population
| Year | Pop. | ±% p.a. |
|---|---|---|
| 1968 | 167 | — |
| 1975 | 144 | −2.09% |
| 1982 | 133 | −1.13% |
| 1990 | 89 | −4.90% |
| 1999 | 71 | −2.48% |
| 2007 | 92 | +3.29% |
| 2012 | 96 | +0.85% |
| 2017 | 92 | −0.85% |
| 2023 | 97 | +0.89% |
Source: INSEE

== See also ==
- Communes of the Charente department
