= Chalais, Charente =

Chalais
- Commune
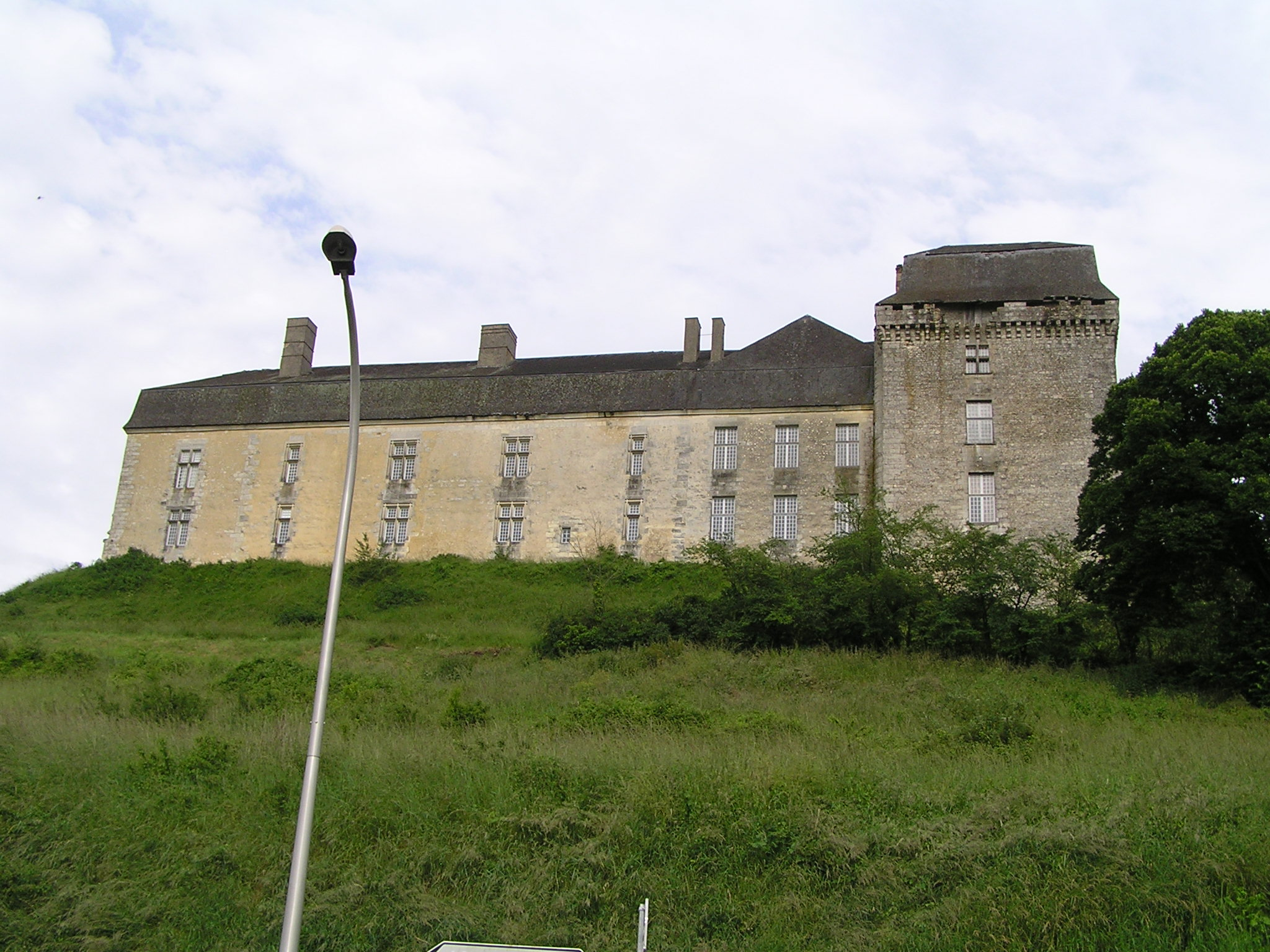
- Chateau

- Coat of arms
- Location of Chalais
- Location within France Location within Nouvelle-Aquitaine
- Coordinates: 45°16′26″N 0°02′24″E
- Country: France
- Region: Nouvelle-Aquitaine
- Department: Charente
- Arrondissement: Angoulême
- Canton: Tude-et-Lavalette
- Intercommunality: Lavalette Tude Dronne

Government
  - Mayor (2024–2026): Jacques Blanchet
- Area^{1}: 17.58 km^{2} (6.79 sq mi)
- Highest elevation: 130 m (430 ft)
- Lowest elevation: 35 m (115 ft)
- Population (2023): 1,812
  - Density: 103.1/km^{2} (267.0/sq mi)
- Time zone: UTC+01:00 (CET)
  - Summer (DST): UTC+02:00 (CEST)
- INSEE/Postal code: 16073 /16210
- ^{1} French Land Register data, which excludes lakes, ponds, glaciers > 1 km^{2} (0.386 sq mi or 247 acres) and river estuaries.

Chalais (French pronunciation: [ʃalɛ]) is a commune in the Charente department in southwestern France. It is the southernmost town in the Charente with over 1,000 people. It lies along the river Tude.

== Population ==
In 1946 Chalais absorbed the former commune Saint-Christophe, and in 1972 the former communes Sainte-Marie and Sérignac. The population data in the table below refer to the commune of Chalais proper, in its geography at the given years.

Historical population

Year	Pop.	±% p.a.
1793	456	—
1821	476	+0.15%
1846	613	+1.02%
1872	775	+0.91%
1901	895	+0.50%
1926	856	−0.18%
1936	900	+0.50%
1946	1,746	+6.85%
1954	1,643	−0.76%
1962	1,703	+0.45%

Year	Pop.	±% p.a.
1968	1,834	+1.24%
1975	2,538	+4.75%
1982	2,204	−2.00%
1990	2,172	−0.18%
1999	2,027	−0.76%
2007	1,961	−0.41%
2012	1,807	−1.62%
2017	1,759	−0.54%
2023	1,812	+0.50%

Source: EHESS and INSEE (1968-2023)

== See also ==
- Communes of the Charente department
