= Canton of Tude-et-Lavalette =

Coordinates: 45.27°N 0.04°E

- Canton
- Situation of the canton of Tude-et-Lavalette in the department of Charente
- Country: France
- Region: Nouvelle-Aquitaine
- Department: Charente
- No. of communes: {{{nbcomm}}}
- Population (2023): 17,469
- INSEE code: 1617

The canton of Tude-et-Lavalette is an administrative division of the Charente department, southwestern France. It was created at the French canton reorganisation which came into effect in March 2015. Its seat is in Chalais.

It consists of the following communes:

1. Aubeterre-sur-Dronne
2. Bardenac
3. Bazac
4. Bellon
5. Bessac
6. Blanzaguet-Saint-Cybard
7. Boisné-la-Tude
8. Bonnes
9. Bors
10. Brie-sous-Chalais
11. Chadurie
12. Chalais
13. Châtignac
14. Combiers
15. Courgeac
16. Courlac
17. Curac
18. Deviat
19. Édon
20. Les Essards
21. Fouquebrune
22. Gurat
23. Juignac
24. Laprade
25. Magnac-lès-Gardes
26. Médillac
27. Montboyer
28. Montignac-le-Coq
29. Montmoreau
30. Nabinaud
31. Nonac
32. Orival
33. Palluaud
34. Pillac
35. Poullignac
36. Rioux-Martin
37. Ronsenac
38. Rouffiac
39. Rougnac
40. Saint-Avit
41. Saint-Laurent-des-Combes
42. Saint-Martial
43. Saint-Quentin-de-Chalais
44. Saint-Romain
45. Saint-Séverin
46. Salles-Lavalette
47. Vaux-Lavalette
48. Villebois-Lavalette
49. Yviers
