= La Magdeleine =

La Magdeleine may refer to:

- La Magdeleine, Aosta Valley, a town and comune in the Aosta Valley region of Italy
- La Magdeleine, Charente, a commune in the Charente department of France
- Criteuil-la-Magdeleine, a commune in the Charente department of France
