= Souvigné =

Souvigné may refer to the following places in France:

- Souvigné, Charente, a commune in the Charente department
- Souvigné, Indre-et-Loire, a commune in the Indre-et-Loire department
- Souvigné, Deux-Sèvres, a commune in the Deux-Sèvres department
- Souvigné-sur-Même, a commune in the Sarthe department
- Souvigné-sur-Sarthe, a commune in the Sarthe department
