= Gours (disambiguation) =

Gours may refer to:

- Rimstone
- Gours, Gironde, France
- Les Gours, Charente, France
