= Montjean =

Montjean may refer to the following places in France:

- Montjean, Charente, a commune in the Charente department
- Montjean, Mayenne, a commune in the Mayenne department
