= Poursac =

- Commune
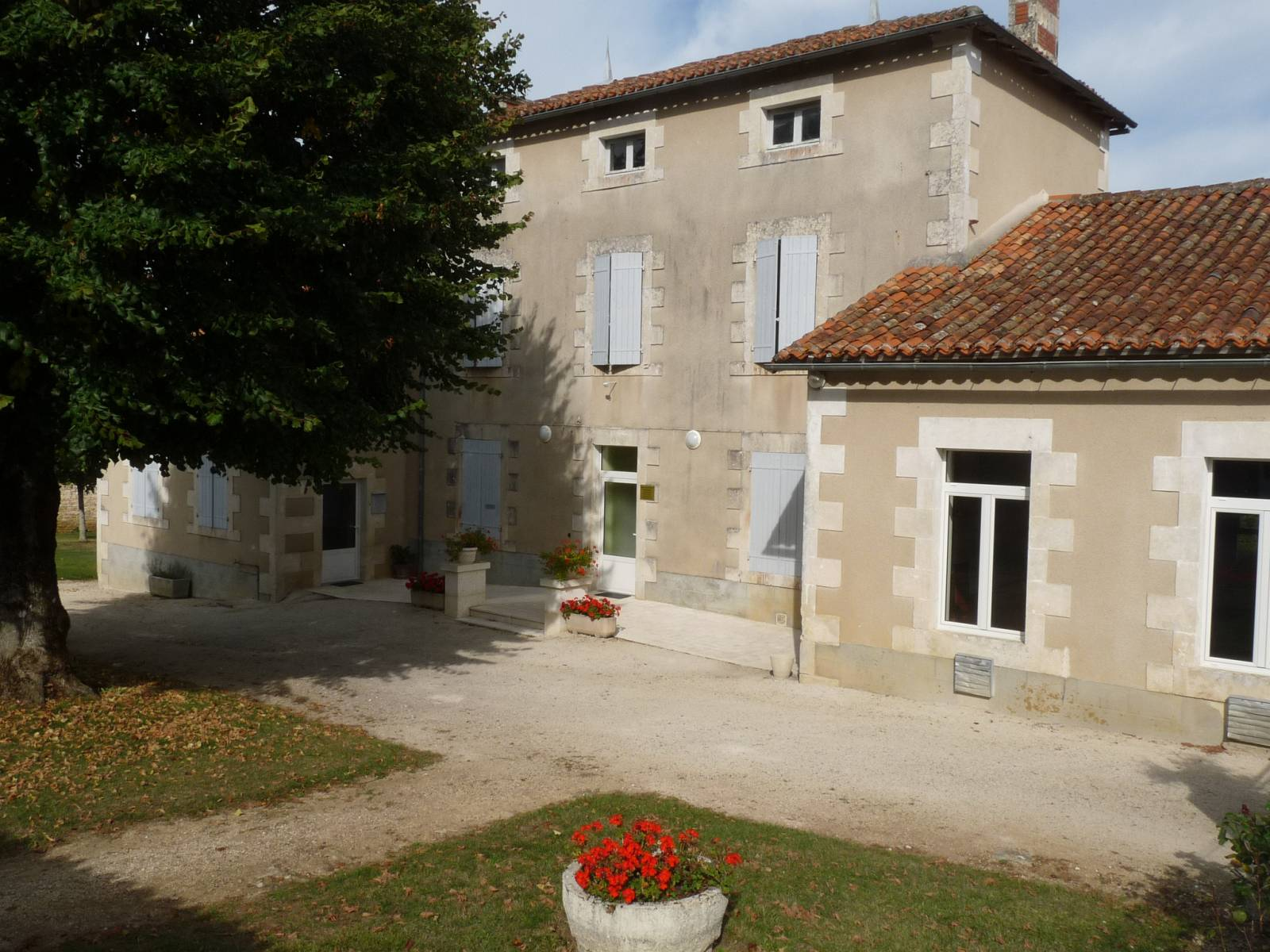
- The town hall in Poursac
- Location of Poursac
- Location within France Location within Nouvelle-Aquitaine
- Coordinates: 45°57′41″N 0°15′34″E
- Country: France
- Region: Nouvelle-Aquitaine
- Department: Charente
- Arrondissement: Confolens
- Canton: Charente-Nord
- Intercommunality: Val de Charente

Government
  - Mayor (2020–2026): Françoise Perrin
- Area^{1}: 11.39 km^{2} (4.40 sq mi)
- Elevation: 75 m (246 ft)
- Highest elevation: 139 m (456 ft)
- Lowest elevation: 70 m (230 ft)
- Population (2023): 185
  - Density: 16.2/km^{2} (42.1/sq mi)
- Time zone: UTC+01:00 (CET)
  - Summer (DST): UTC+02:00 (CEST)
- INSEE/Postal code: 16268 /16700
- ^{1} French Land Register data, which excludes lakes, ponds, glaciers > 1 km^{2} (0.386 sq mi or 247 acres) and river estuaries.

Poursac (French pronunciation: [puʁsak]) is a commune in the Charente department in southwestern France.

== Population ==
Historical population
Year	Pop.	±% p.a.
1968	264	—
1975	258	−0.33%
1982	241	−0.97%
1990	222	−1.02%
1999	210	−0.62%
2007	207	−0.18%
2012	189	−1.80%
2017	204	+1.54%
2023	185	−1.62%
Source: INSEE

== See also ==
- Communes of the Charente department
