= Couture, Charente =

Couture
- Commune
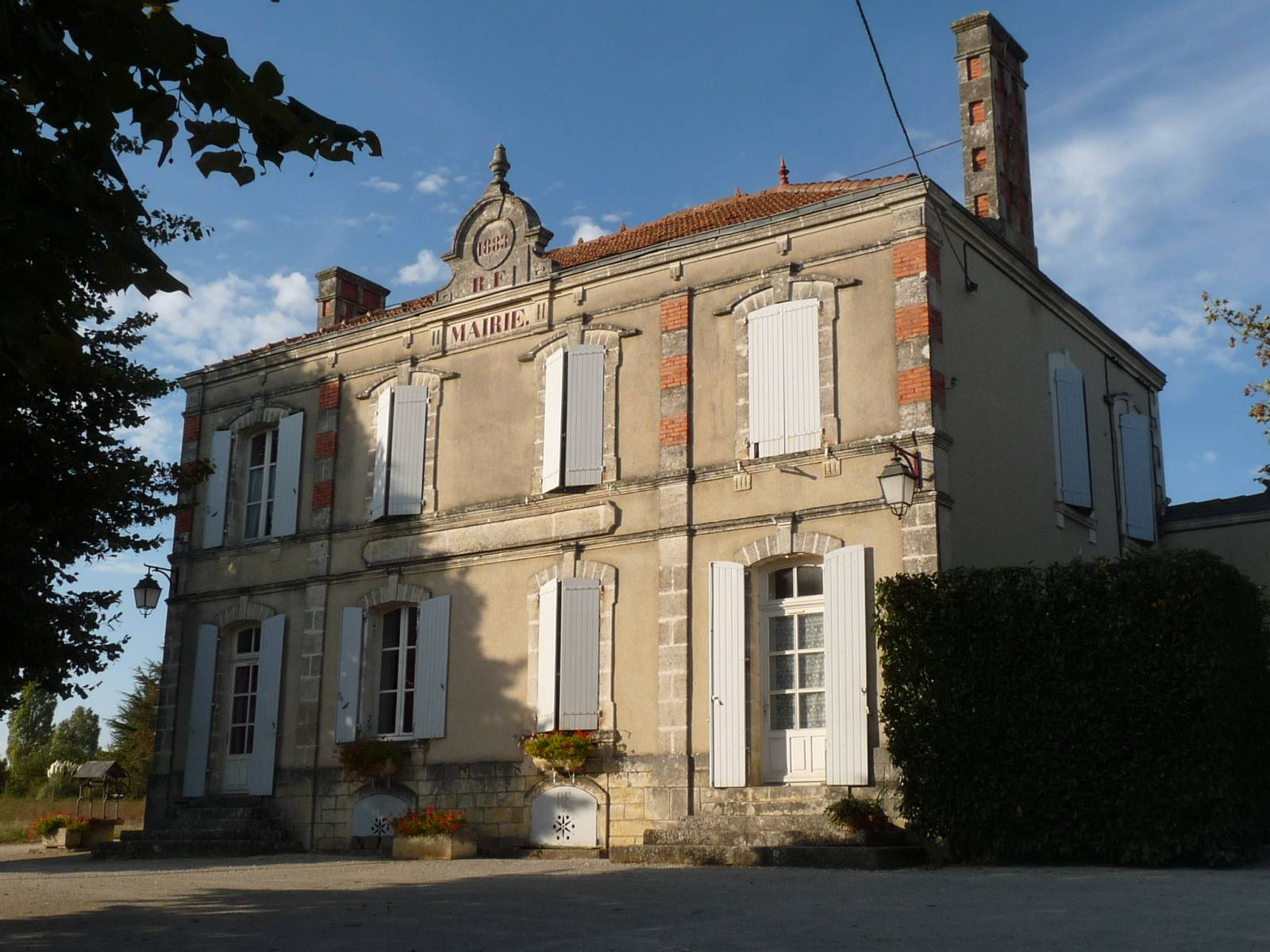
- Town hall
- Location of Couture
- Location within France Location within Nouvelle-Aquitaine
- Coordinates: 45°55′50″N 0°17′11″E
- Country: France
- Region: Nouvelle-Aquitaine
- Department: Charente
- Arrondissement: Confolens
- Canton: Charente-Nord

Government
  - Mayor (2020–2026): Jacqueline Ducloux
- Area^{1}: 10.61 km^{2} (4.10 sq mi)
- Elevation: 100 m (330 ft)
- Highest elevation: 135 m (443 ft)
- Lowest elevation: 79 m (259 ft)
- Population (2023): 169
  - Density: 15.9/km^{2} (41.3/sq mi)
- Time zone: UTC+01:00 (CET)
  - Summer (DST): UTC+02:00 (CEST)
- INSEE/Postal code: 16114 /16460
- ^{1} French Land Register data, which excludes lakes, ponds, glaciers > 1 km^{2} (0.386 sq mi or 247 acres) and river estuaries.

Couture (French pronunciation: [kutyʁ]) is a commune in the Charente department in southwestern France.

== Population ==
Historical population
Year	Pop.	±% p.a.
1968	252	—
1975	210	−2.57%
1982	206	−0.27%
1990	177	−1.88%
1999	158	−1.25%
2007	161	+0.24%
2012	166	+0.61%
2017	159	−0.86%
2023	169	+1.02%
Source: INSEE

== See also ==
- Communes of the Charente department
