= Brettes =

- Commune
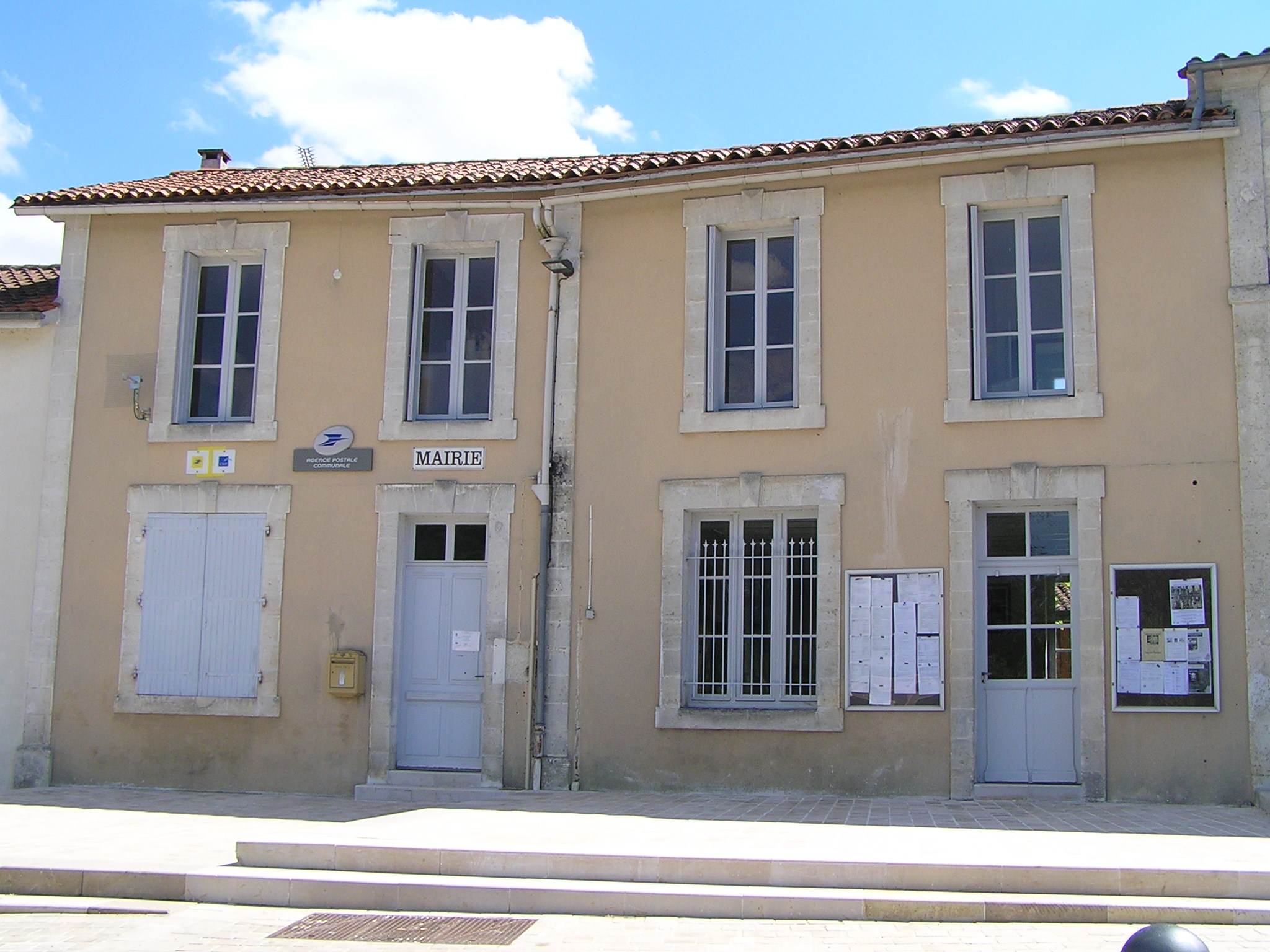
- Town hall

- Coat of arms
- Location of Brettes
- Location within France Location within Nouvelle-Aquitaine
- Coordinates: 46°00′21″N 0°02′31″E
- Country: France
- Region: Nouvelle-Aquitaine
- Department: Charente
- Arrondissement: Confolens
- Canton: Charente-Nord
- Intercommunality: Val de Charente

Government
  - Mayor (2020–2026): Thierry André
- Area^{1}: 12.21 km^{2} (4.71 sq mi)
- Elevation: 100 m (330 ft)
- Highest elevation: 126 m (413 ft)
- Lowest elevation: 75 m (246 ft)
- Population (2023): 162
  - Density: 13.3/km^{2} (34.4/sq mi)
- Time zone: UTC+01:00 (CET)
  - Summer (DST): UTC+02:00 (CEST)
- INSEE/Postal code: 16059 /16240
- ^{1} French Land Register data, which excludes lakes, ponds, glaciers > 1 km^{2} (0.386 sq mi or 247 acres) and river estuaries.

Brettes (French pronunciation: [bʁɛt]) is a commune in the Charente department in southwestern France.

== Population ==
Historical population
Year	Pop.	±% p.a.
1968	232	—
1975	208	−1.55%
1982	197	−0.77%
1990	197	+0.00%
1999	187	−0.58%
2007	191	+0.26%
2012	198	+0.72%
2017	175	−2.44%
2023	162	−1.28%
Source: INSEE

== See also ==
- Communes of the Charente department
