= Theil-Rabier =

- Commune
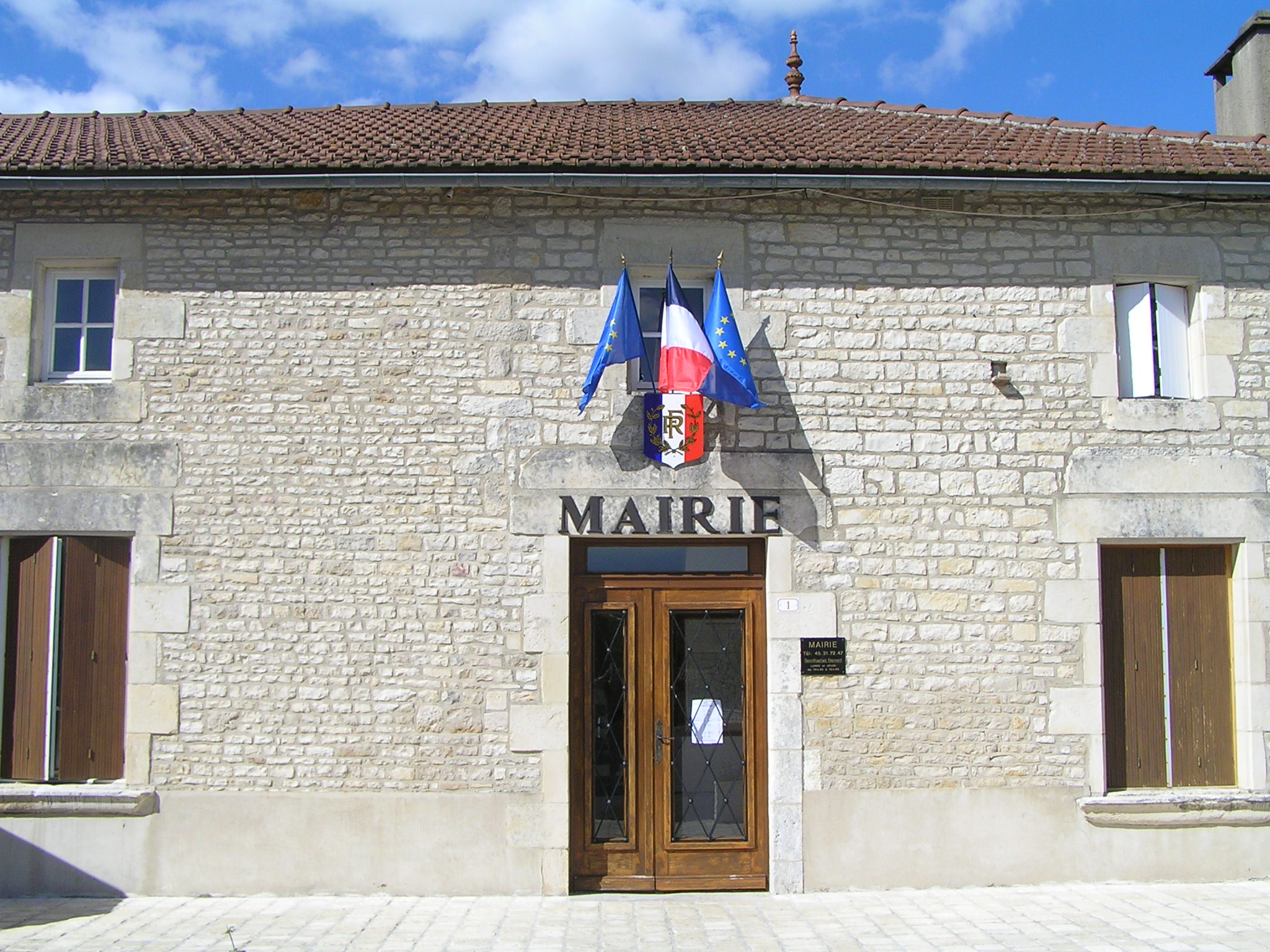
- Town hall
- Location of Theil-Rabier
- Location within France Location within Nouvelle-Aquitaine
- Coordinates: 46°03′02″N 0°02′18″E
- Country: France
- Region: Nouvelle-Aquitaine
- Department: Charente
- Arrondissement: Confolens
- Canton: Charente-Nord

Government
  - Mayor (2020–2026): Philippe Merle
- Area^{1}: 7.43 km^{2} (2.87 sq mi)
- Elevation: 160 m (520 ft)
- Highest elevation: 162 m (531 ft)
- Lowest elevation: 109 m (358 ft)
- Population (2023): 164
  - Density: 22.1/km^{2} (57.2/sq mi)
- Time zone: UTC+01:00 (CET)
  - Summer (DST): UTC+02:00 (CEST)
- INSEE/Postal code: 16381 /16240
- ^{1} French Land Register data, which excludes lakes, ponds, glaciers > 1 km^{2} (0.386 sq mi or 247 acres) and river estuaries.

Theil-Rabier is a commune in the Charente department in southwestern France.

== Population ==
Historical population
Year	Pop.	±% p.a.
1968	189	—
1975	177	−0.93%
1982	176	−0.08%
1990	170	−0.43%
1999	166	−0.26%
2007	156	−0.77%
2012	159	+0.38%
2017	171	+1.47%
2023	164	−0.69%
Source: INSEE

== See also ==
- Communes of the Charente department
