= Verdille =

- Commune
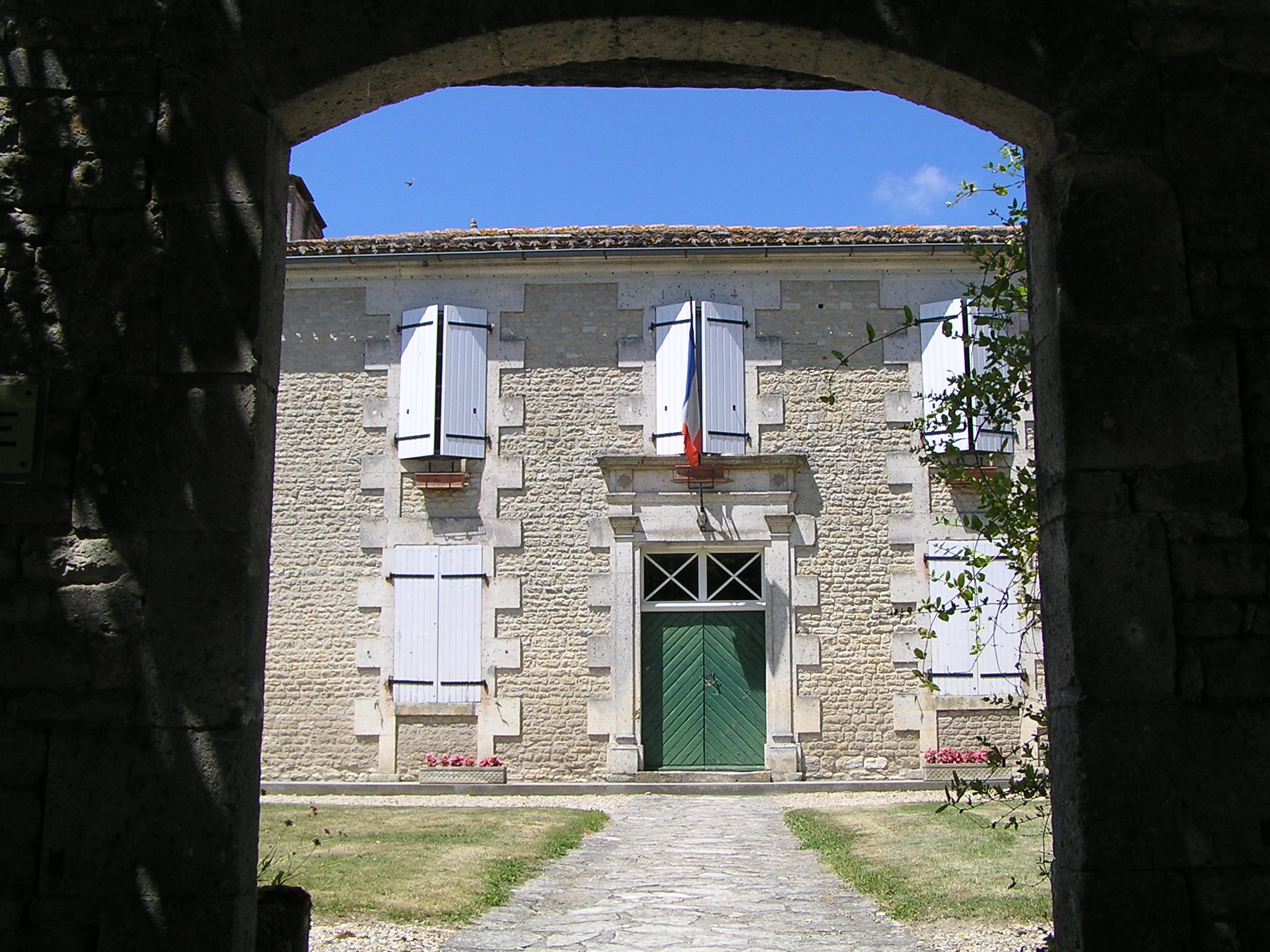
- Town hall
- Location of Verdille
- Location within France Location within Nouvelle-Aquitaine
- Coordinates: 45°52′57″N 0°06′15″W
- Country: France
- Region: Nouvelle-Aquitaine
- Department: Charente
- Arrondissement: Confolens
- Canton: Charente-Nord
- Intercommunality: Cœur de Charente

Government
  - Mayor (2020–2026): Manuella Chavouet-Dos Santos
- Area^{1}: 14.48 km^{2} (5.59 sq mi)
- Highest elevation: 139 m (456 ft)
- Lowest elevation: 75 m (246 ft)
- Population (2023): 385
  - Density: 26.6/km^{2} (68.9/sq mi)
- Time zone: UTC+01:00 (CET)
  - Summer (DST): UTC+02:00 (CEST)
- INSEE/Postal code: 16397 /16140
- ^{1} French Land Register data, which excludes lakes, ponds, glaciers > 1 km^{2} (0.386 sq mi or 247 acres) and river estuaries.

Verdille (French pronunciation: [vɛʁdij]) is a commune in the Charente department in southwestern France.

== Population ==
Historical population
Year	Pop.	±% p.a.
1968	504	—
1975	518	+0.39%
1982	466	−1.50%
1990	371	−2.81%
1999	358	−0.40%
2007	347	−0.39%
2012	337	−0.58%
2017	353	+0.93%
2023	385	+1.46%
Source: INSEE

== See also ==
- Communes of the Charente department
