= Saint-Georges, Charente =

Saint-Georges
- Commune
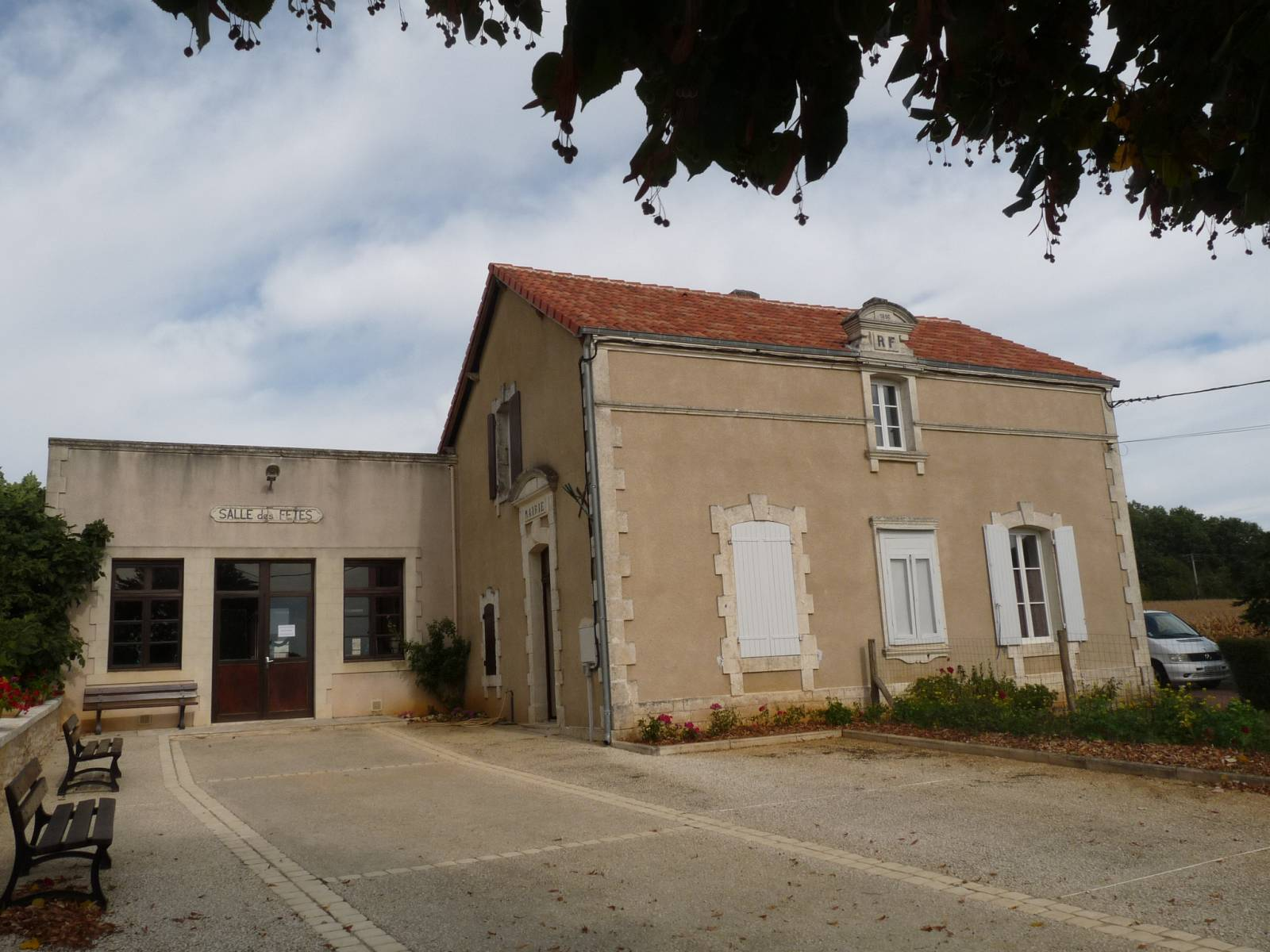
- Town hall
- Location of Saint-Georges
- Location within France Location within Nouvelle-Aquitaine
- Coordinates: 45°58′24″N 0°16′18″E
- Country: France
- Region: Nouvelle-Aquitaine
- Department: Charente
- Arrondissement: Confolens
- Canton: Charente-Nord

Government
  - Mayor (2020–2026): Gilbert Ballon
- Area^{1}: 2.25 km^{2} (0.87 sq mi)
- Elevation: 122 m (400 ft)
- Highest elevation: 125 m (410 ft)
- Lowest elevation: 76 m (249 ft)
- Population (2023): 44
  - Density: 20/km^{2} (51/sq mi)
- Time zone: UTC+01:00 (CET)
  - Summer (DST): UTC+02:00 (CEST)
- INSEE/Postal code: 16321 /16700
- ^{1} French Land Register data, which excludes lakes, ponds, glaciers > 1 km^{2} (0.386 sq mi or 247 acres) and river estuaries.

Saint-Georges (French pronunciation: [sɛ̃ ʒɔʁʒ]) is a commune in the Charente department in southwestern France.

== Population ==
Historical population
Year	Pop.	±% p.a.
1968	76	—
1975	73	−0.57%
1982	71	−0.40%
1990	75	+0.69%
1999	67	−1.25%
2007	56	−2.22%
2012	54	−0.72%
2017	54	+0.00%
2023	44	−3.36%
Source: INSEE

== See also ==
- Communes of the Charente department
