= Ranville-Breuillaud =

- Commune
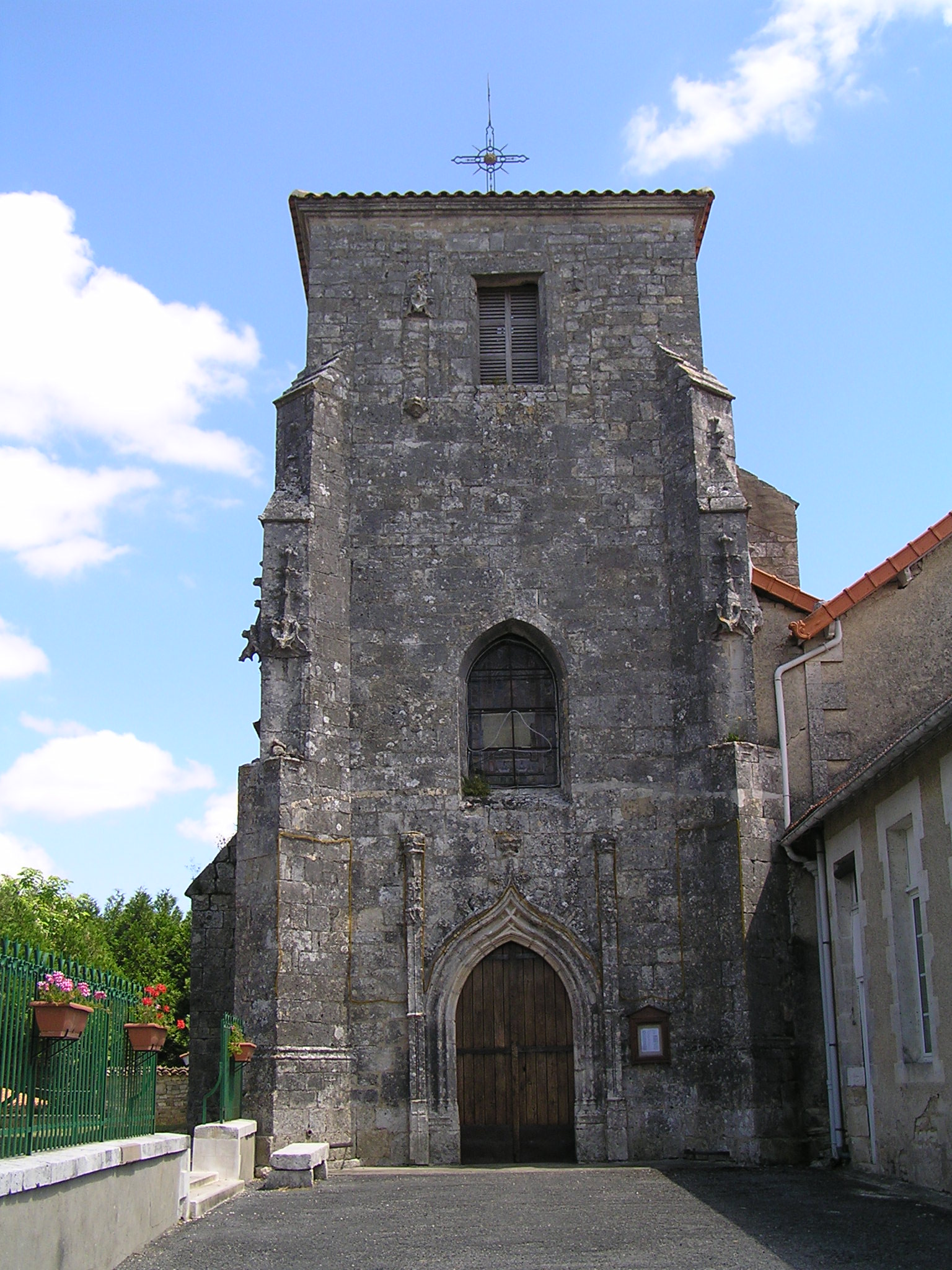
- The church in Ranville
- Location of Ranville-Breuillaud
- Location within France Location within Nouvelle-Aquitaine
- Coordinates: 45°54′11″N 0°06′58″W
- Country: France
- Region: Nouvelle-Aquitaine
- Department: Charente
- Arrondissement: Confolens
- Canton: Charente-Nord

Government
  - Mayor (2020–2026): Karine Jeune
- Area^{1}: 12.84 km^{2} (4.96 sq mi)
- Elevation: 116 m (381 ft)
- Highest elevation: 144 m (472 ft)
- Lowest elevation: 84 m (276 ft)
- Population (2023): 157
  - Density: 12.2/km^{2} (31.7/sq mi)
- Time zone: UTC+01:00 (CET)
  - Summer (DST): UTC+02:00 (CEST)
- INSEE/Postal code: 16275 /16140
- ^{1} French Land Register data, which excludes lakes, ponds, glaciers > 1 km^{2} (0.386 sq mi or 247 acres) and river estuaries.

Ranville-Breuillaud (French pronunciation: [ʁɑ̃vil bʁœjo]) is a commune in the Charente department in southwestern France.

== Population ==
Historical population
Year	Pop.	±% p.a.
1968	240	—
1975	211	−1.82%
1982	193	−1.27%
1990	180	−0.87%
1999	178	−0.12%
2007	180	+0.14%
2012	184	+0.44%
2017	176	−0.89%
2023	157	−1.89%
Source: INSEE

== See also ==
- Communes of the Charente department
