= Saint-Martin-du-Clocher =

- Commune
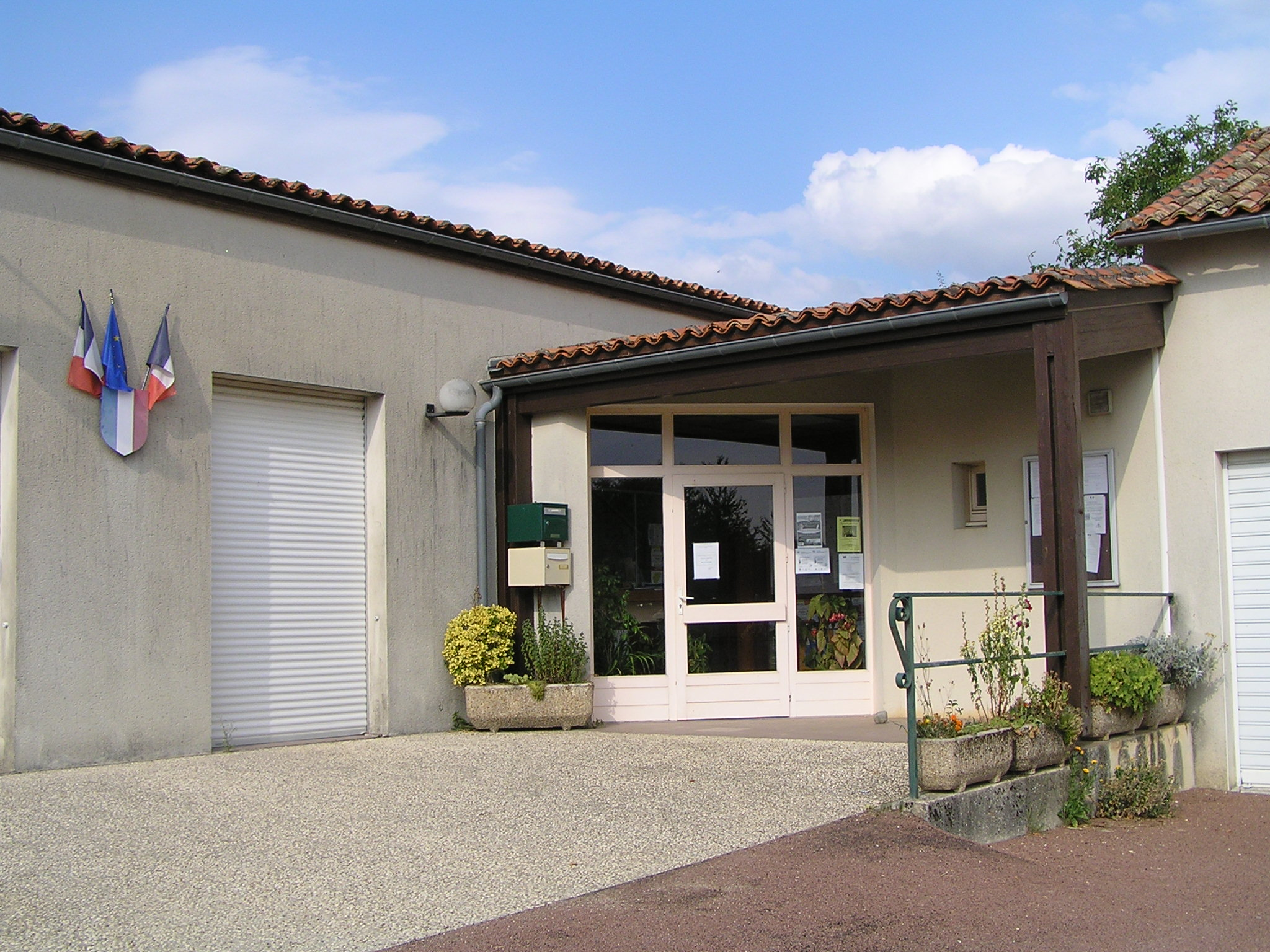
- Town hall
- Location of Saint-Martin-du-Clocher
- Location within France Location within Nouvelle-Aquitaine
- Coordinates: 46°03′45″N 0°09′20″E
- Country: France
- Region: Nouvelle-Aquitaine
- Department: Charente
- Arrondissement: Confolens
- Canton: Charente-Nord

Government
  - Mayor (2020–2026): Joël Trouvé
- Area^{1}: 6.66 km^{2} (2.57 sq mi)
- Elevation: 143 m (469 ft)
- Highest elevation: 153 m (502 ft)
- Lowest elevation: 102 m (335 ft)
- Population (2023): 126
  - Density: 18.9/km^{2} (49.0/sq mi)
- Time zone: UTC+01:00 (CET)
  - Summer (DST): UTC+02:00 (CEST)
- INSEE/Postal code: 16335 /16700
- ^{1} French Land Register data, which excludes lakes, ponds, glaciers > 1 km^{2} (0.386 sq mi or 247 acres) and river estuaries.

Saint-Martin-du-Clocher (French pronunciation: [sɛ̃ maʁtɛ̃ dy klɔʃe]) is a commune in the Charente department in southwestern France.

== Population ==
Historical population
Year	Pop.	±% p.a.
1968	188	—
1975	136	−4.52%
1982	137	+0.10%
1990	131	−0.56%
1999	139	+0.66%
2007	133	−0.55%
2012	130	−0.46%
2017	123	−1.10%
2023	126	+0.40%
Source: INSEE

== See also ==
- Communes of the Charente department
