= Canton of Charente-Nord =

Coordinates: 46.03°N 0.20°E

- Canton
- Situation of the canton of Charente-Nord in the department of Charente
- Country: France
- Region: Nouvelle-Aquitaine
- Department: Charente
- No. of communes: {{{nbcomm}}}
- Population (2023): 18,317
- INSEE code: 1608

The canton of Charente-Nord is an administrative division of the Charente department, southwestern France. It was created at the French canton reorganisation which came into effect in March 2015. Its seat is in Ruffec.

It consists of the following communes:

1. Les Adjots
2. Aigre
3. Barbezières
4. Barro
5. Bernac
6. Bessé
7. Bioussac
8. Brettes
9. Charmé
10. La Chèvrerie
11. Condac
12. Courcôme
13. Couture
14. Ébréon
15. Empuré
16. La Faye
17. La Forêt-de-Tessé
18. Fouqueure
19. Les Gours
20. Ligné
21. Londigny
22. Longré
23. Lupsault
24. La Magdeleine
25. Montjean
26. Nanteuil-en-Vallée
27. Oradour
28. Paizay-Naudouin-Embourie
29. Poursac
30. Raix
31. Ranville-Breuillaud
32. Ruffec
33. Saint-Fraigne
34. Saint-Georges
35. Saint-Gourson
36. Saint-Martin-du-Clocher
37. Saint-Sulpice-de-Ruffec
38. Salles-de-Villefagnan
39. Souvigné
40. Taizé-Aizie
41. Theil-Rabier
42. Tusson
43. Verdille
44. Verteuil-sur-Charente
45. Villefagnan
46. Villiers-le-Roux
