= Ébréon =

- Commune
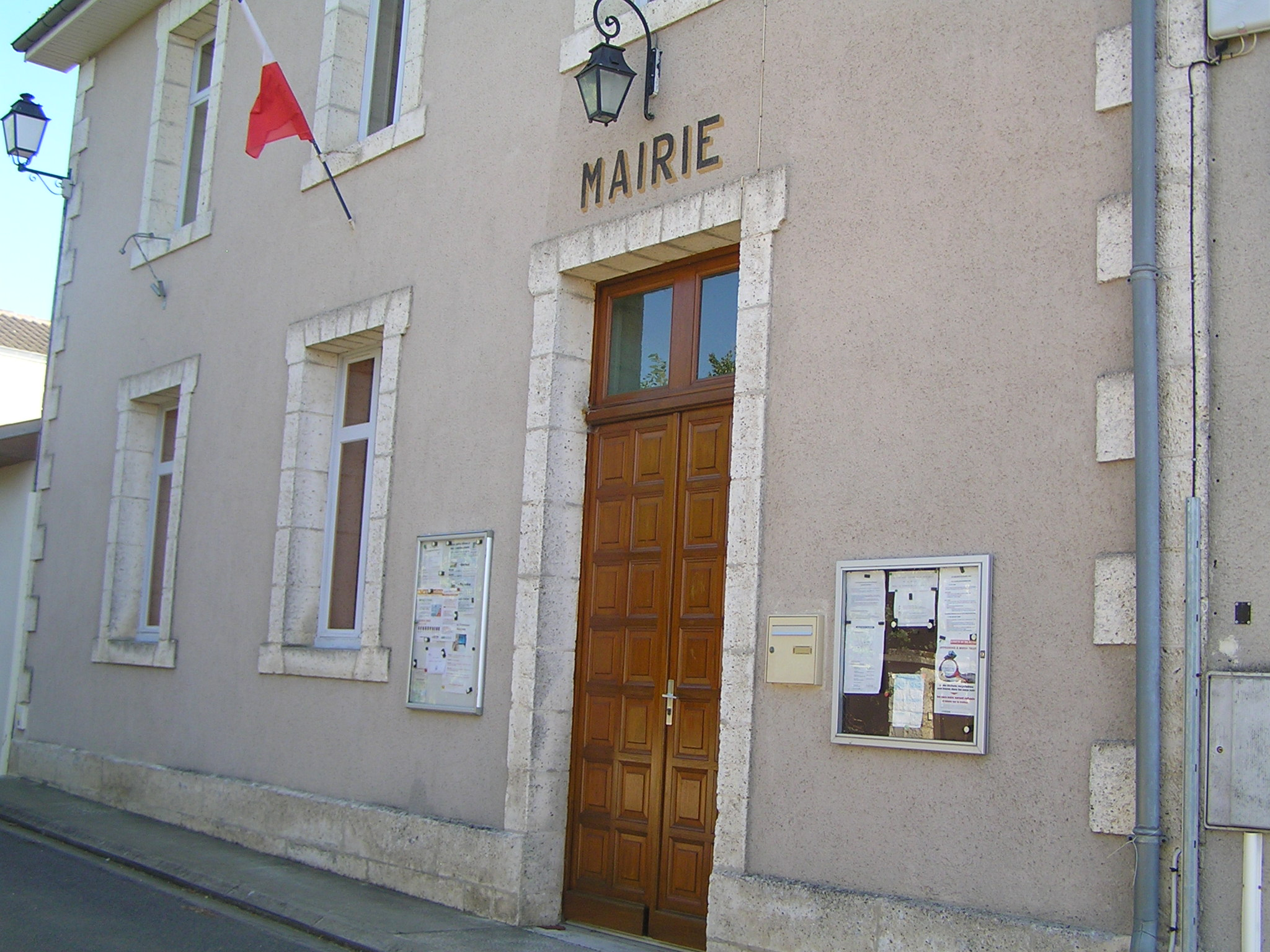
- Town hall
- Location of Ébréon
- Location within France Location within Nouvelle-Aquitaine
- Coordinates: 45°56′18″N 0°01′55″E
- Country: France
- Region: Nouvelle-Aquitaine
- Department: Charente
- Arrondissement: Confolens
- Canton: Charente-Nord
- Intercommunality: Cœur de Charente

Government
  - Mayor (2020–2026): Jean-Guy Guyon
- Area^{1}: 10.05 km^{2} (3.88 sq mi)
- Elevation: 70 m (230 ft)
- Highest elevation: 118 m (387 ft)
- Lowest elevation: 69 m (226 ft)
- Population (2023): 139
  - Density: 13.8/km^{2} (35.8/sq mi)
- Time zone: UTC+01:00 (CET)
  - Summer (DST): UTC+02:00 (CEST)
- INSEE/Postal code: 16122 /16140
- ^{1} French Land Register data, which excludes lakes, ponds, glaciers > 1 km^{2} (0.386 sq mi or 247 acres) and river estuaries.

Ébréon (French pronunciation: [ebʁeɔ̃]) is a commune in the Charente department in southwestern France.

== Population ==
Historical population
Year	Pop.	±% p.a.
1968	215	—
1975	185	−2.12%
1982	188	+0.23%
1990	174	−0.96%
1999	176	+0.13%
2007	155	−1.58%
2012	160	+0.64%
2017	143	−2.22%
2023	139	−0.47%
Source: INSEE

== See also ==
- Communes of the Charente department
