= Paizay-Naudouin-Embourie =

- Commune
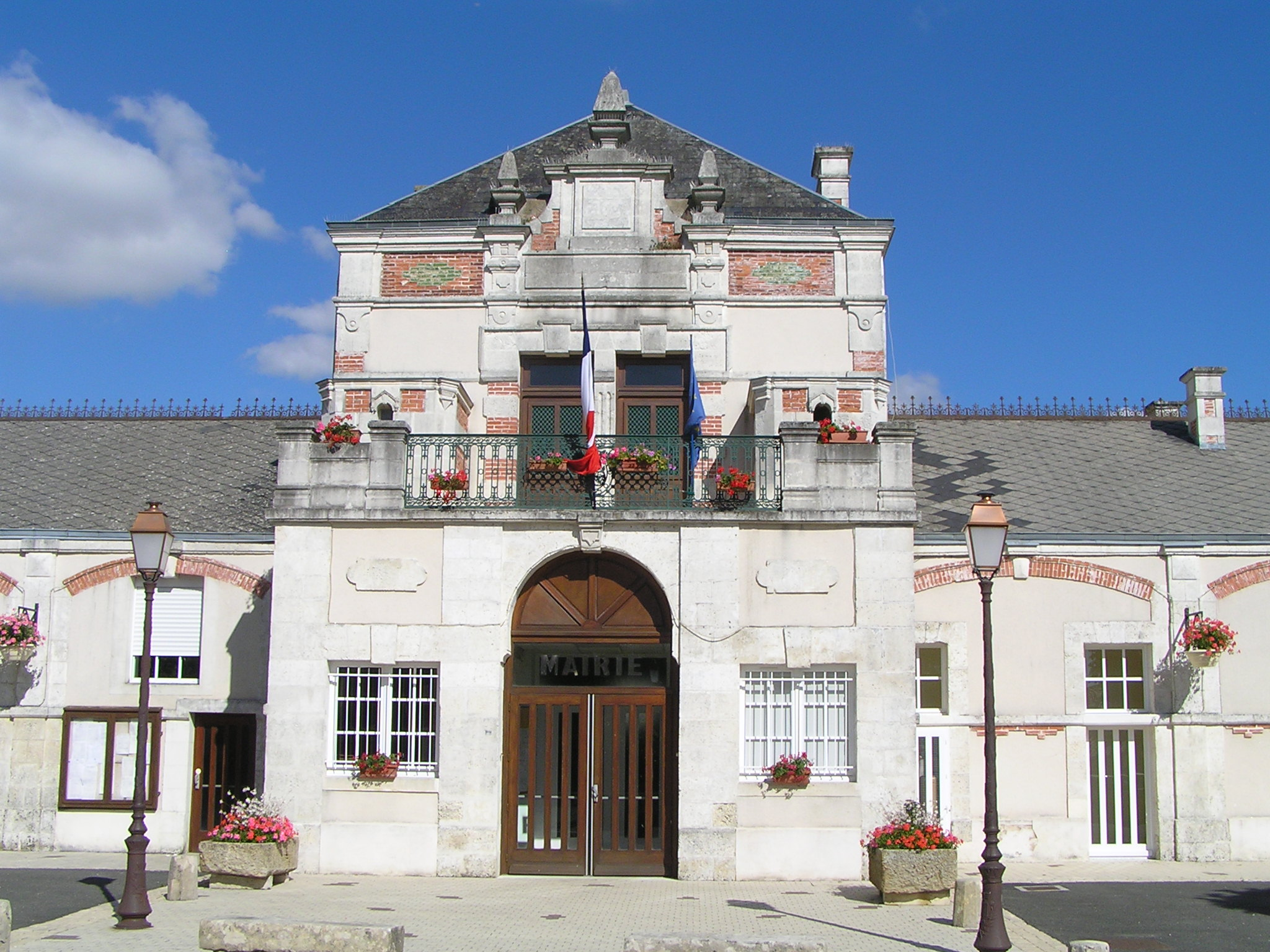
- Town hall
- Location of Paizay-Naudouin-Embourie
- Location within France Location within Nouvelle-Aquitaine
- Coordinates: 46°01′52″N 0°00′08″W
- Country: France
- Region: Nouvelle-Aquitaine
- Department: Charente
- Arrondissement: Confolens
- Canton: Charente-Nord
- Intercommunality: Val de Charente

Government
  - Mayor (2020–2026): Arnault Michaud
- Area^{1}: 25.42 km^{2} (9.81 sq mi)
- Elevation: 83 m (272 ft)
- Highest elevation: 155 m (509 ft)
- Lowest elevation: 78 m (256 ft)
- Population (2023): 337
  - Density: 13.3/km^{2} (34.3/sq mi)
- Time zone: UTC+01:00 (CET)
  - Summer (DST): UTC+02:00 (CEST)
- INSEE/Postal code: 16253 /16240
- ^{1} French Land Register data, which excludes lakes, ponds, glaciers > 1 km^{2} (0.386 sq mi or 247 acres) and river estuaries.

Paizay-Naudouin-Embourie (French pronunciation: [pɛzɛ nodwɛ̃ ɑ̃buʁi]) is a commune in the Charente department in southwestern France.

== Population ==
Historical population
Year	Pop.	±% p.a.
1968	669	—
1975	583	−1.95%
1982	514	−1.78%
1990	493	−0.52%
1999	423	−1.69%
2007	403	−0.60%
2012	394	−0.45%
2017	368	−1.36%
2023	337	−1.46%
Source: INSEE

== See also ==
- Communes of the Charente department
