= Saint-Sulpice-de-Ruffec =

- Commune
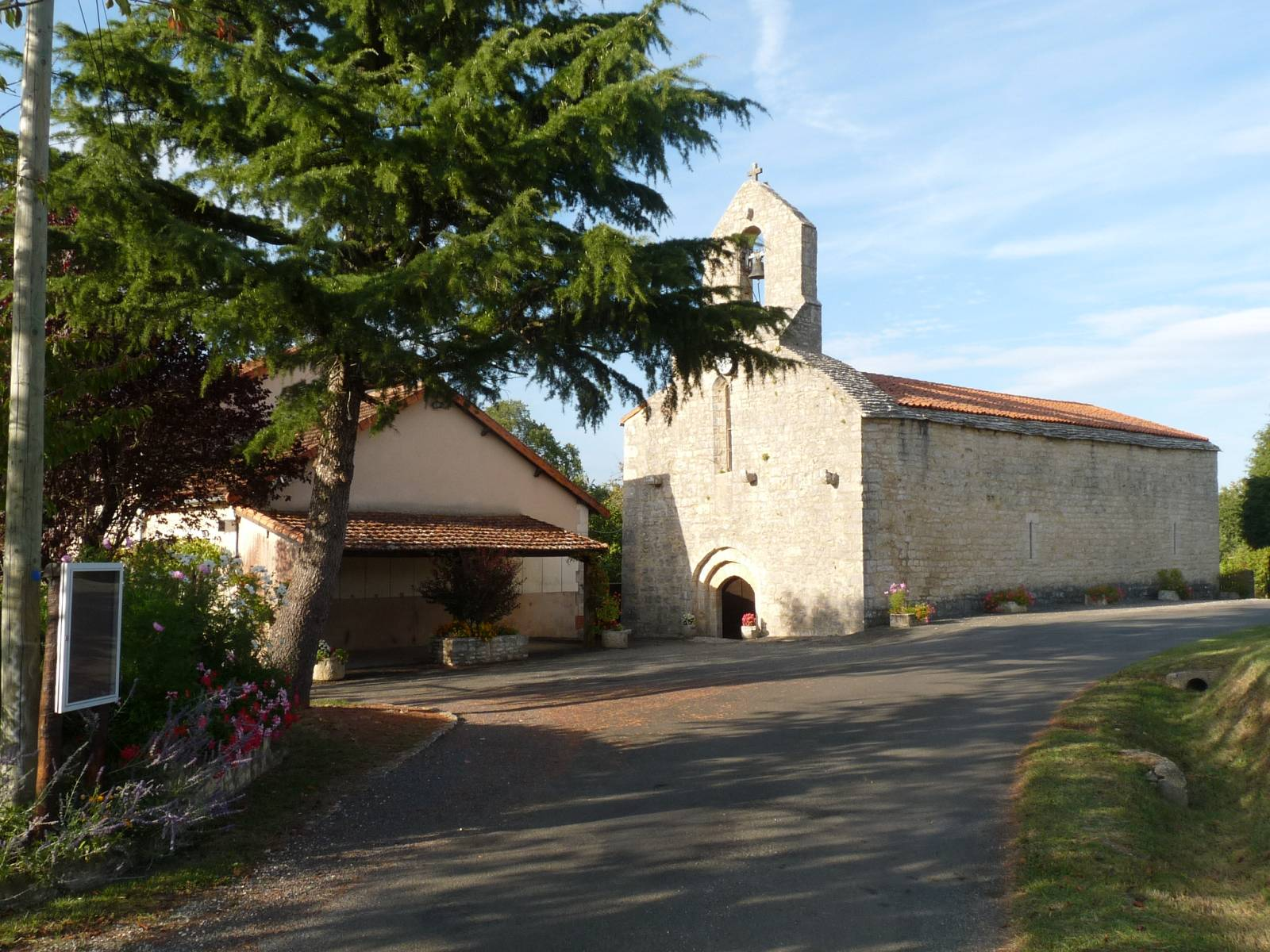
- The church in Saint-Sulpice-de-Ruffec
- Location of Saint-Sulpice-de-Ruffec
- Location within France Location within Nouvelle-Aquitaine
- Coordinates: 45°56′27″N 0°18′55″E
- Country: France
- Region: Nouvelle-Aquitaine
- Department: Charente
- Arrondissement: Confolens
- Canton: Charente-Nord
- Intercommunality: Val de Charente

Government
  - Mayor (2020–2026): Geoffroy Dudouit
- Area^{1}: 2.38 km^{2} (0.92 sq mi)
- Elevation: 90 m (300 ft)
- Highest elevation: 162 m (531 ft)
- Lowest elevation: 92 m (302 ft)
- Population (2023): 45
  - Density: 19/km^{2} (49/sq mi)
- Time zone: UTC+01:00 (CET)
  - Summer (DST): UTC+02:00 (CEST)
- INSEE/Postal code: 16356 /16460
- ^{1} French Land Register data, which excludes lakes, ponds, glaciers > 1 km^{2} (0.386 sq mi or 247 acres) and river estuaries.

Saint-Sulpice-de-Ruffec (French pronunciation: [sɛ̃ sylpis də ʁyfɛk], literally Saint-Sulpice of Ruffec) is a commune in the Charente department in southwestern France. With 32 inhabitants (2020), it is the least populated commune of Charente.

== Geography ==
The commune is situated in the valley of the river Tiarde. The northwest of the commune of Saint-Sulpice-de-Ruffec is watered by the Tiarde; the remaining land includes the valley's high plateau.

The village of Saint Sulpice consists of a collection of houses grouped around the church and overlooking the valley of the Tiarde and a collection of small hamlets: Le Roule at the edge of the town of Couture, les Fantins near Route of Champagne-Mouton-Chenon in the south of the commune, les Raffoux, Chez Bahuet near to the Tiarde, etc.

The commune of Saint-Sulpice-de-Ruffec is 10 miles southeast of Ruffec, there is one main road running through the commune the Aunac to Champagne-Mouton road

The soil is predominantly clay.

== Population ==
Historical population
Year	Pop.	±% p.a.
1968	83	—
1975	67	−3.01%
1982	50	−4.09%
1990	46	−1.04%
1999	35	−2.99%
2007	36	+0.35%
2012	32	−2.33%
2017	31	−0.63%
2023	45	+6.41%
Source: INSEE

== Economy ==
Agricultural: bovine and crops mainly maize, oil seed rape and sunflowers, diversification into raising of Alpaca s, for wool and breeding

== Sights ==
The village of Saint-Sulpice is centred on its 12th-century church. Directly outside the church is a war memorial dedicated to eight people who lost their lives in the first world war (1914–1918).

On the outskirts of the commune of Saint-Sulpice-de-Ruffec, there is a memorial to a French patriot Largeau Gilbert who was shot on 26 June 1944.

== See also ==
- Communes of the Charente department
