= Saint-Gourson =

- Commune
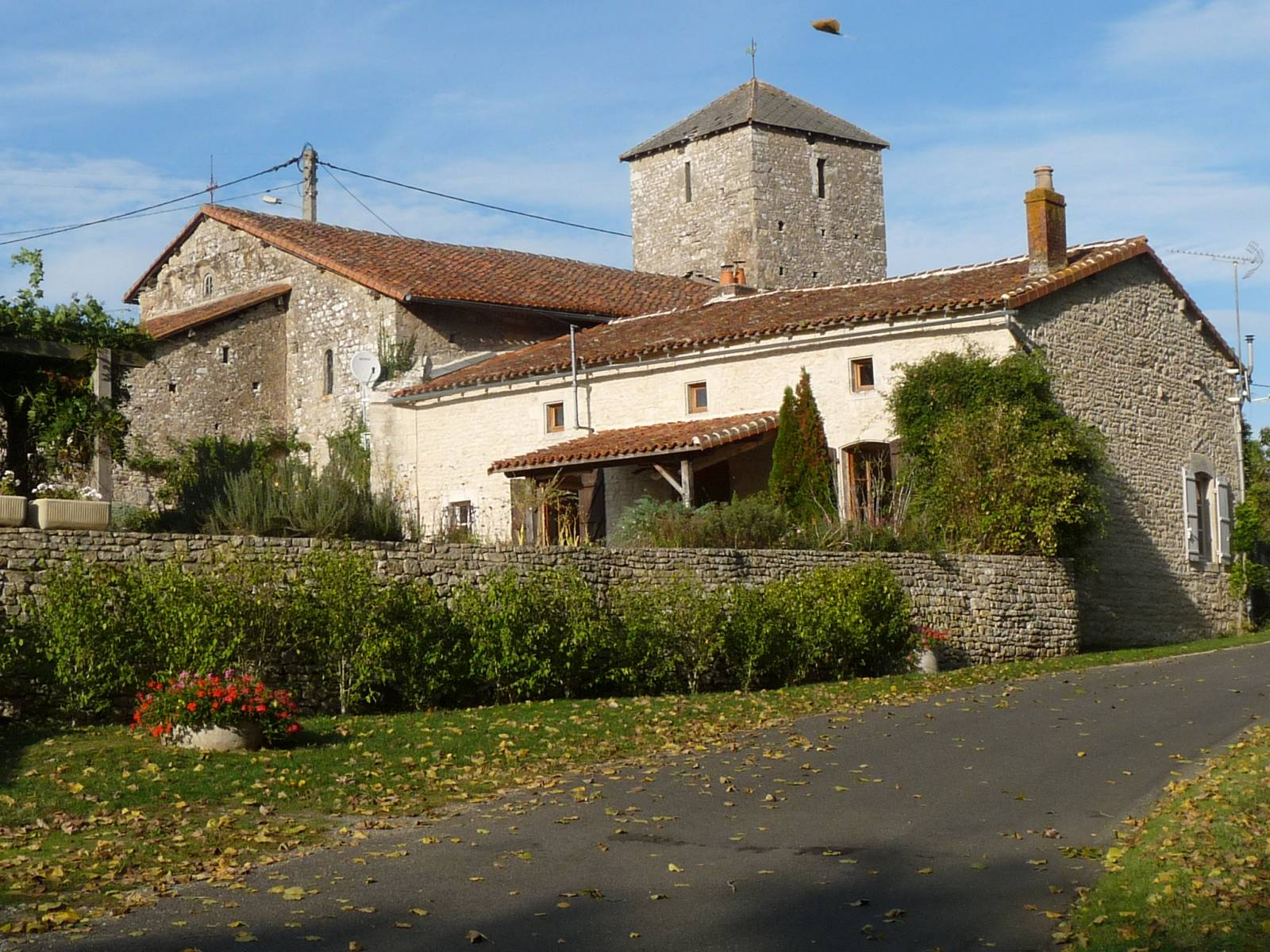
- The church in Saint-Gourson
- Location of Saint-Gourson
- Location within France Location within Nouvelle-Aquitaine
- Coordinates: 45°57′07″N 0°19′25″E
- Country: France
- Region: Nouvelle-Aquitaine
- Department: Charente
- Arrondissement: Confolens
- Canton: Charente-Nord

Government
  - Mayor (2023–2026): James Martin
- Area^{1}: 10.09 km^{2} (3.90 sq mi)
- Elevation: 130 m (430 ft)
- Highest elevation: 161 m (528 ft)
- Lowest elevation: 89 m (292 ft)
- Population (2023): 133
  - Density: 13.2/km^{2} (34.1/sq mi)
- Time zone: UTC+01:00 (CET)
  - Summer (DST): UTC+02:00 (CEST)
- INSEE/Postal code: 16325 /16700
- ^{1} French Land Register data, which excludes lakes, ponds, glaciers > 1 km^{2} (0.386 sq mi or 247 acres) and river estuaries.

Saint-Gourson (French pronunciation: [sɛ̃ ɡuʁsɔ̃]) is a commune in the Charente department in southwestern France.

== Population ==
Historical population
Year	Pop.	±% p.a.
1968	232	—
1975	170	−4.34%
1982	179	+0.74%
1990	147	−2.43%
1999	136	−0.86%
2007	128	−0.75%
2012	144	+2.38%
2017	140	−0.56%
2023	133	−0.85%
Source: INSEE

== See also ==
- Communes of the Charente department
