= Villiers-le-Roux =

- Commune
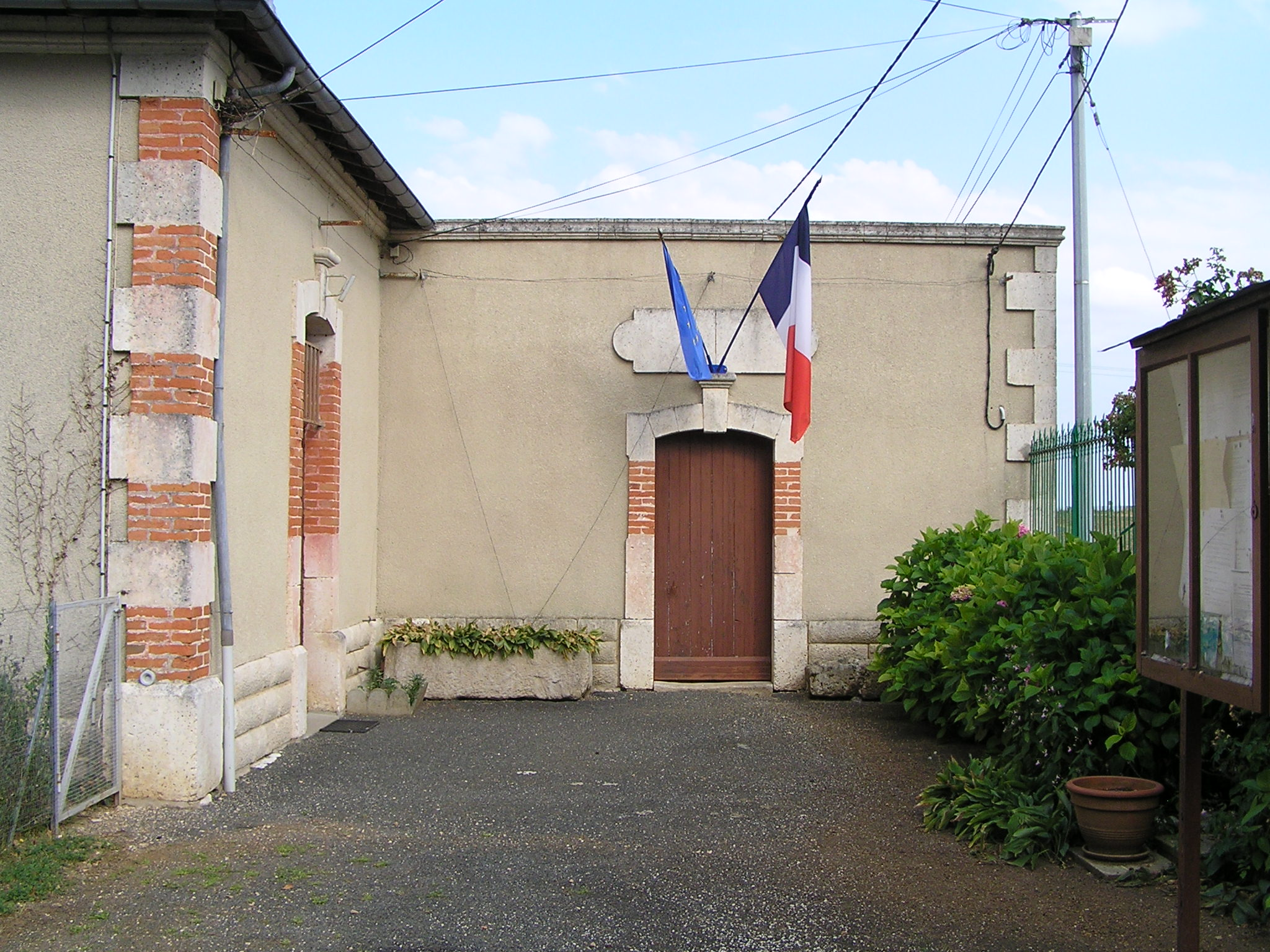
- Town hall
- Location of Villiers-le-Roux
- Location within France Location within Nouvelle-Aquitaine
- Coordinates: 46°02′59″N 0°06′27″E
- Country: France
- Region: Nouvelle-Aquitaine
- Department: Charente
- Arrondissement: Confolens
- Canton: Charente-Nord

Government
  - Mayor (2020–2026): Jean-Christophe Pourageaud
- Area^{1}: 4.84 km^{2} (1.87 sq mi)
- Elevation: 130 m (430 ft)
- Highest elevation: 139 m (456 ft)
- Lowest elevation: 115 m (377 ft)
- Population (2023): 171
  - Density: 35.3/km^{2} (91.5/sq mi)
- Time zone: UTC+01:00 (CET)
  - Summer (DST): UTC+02:00 (CEST)
- INSEE/Postal code: 16413 /16240
- ^{1} French Land Register data, which excludes lakes, ponds, glaciers > 1 km^{2} (0.386 sq mi or 247 acres) and river estuaries.

Villiers-le-Roux (French pronunciation: [vilje lə ʁu]) is a commune in the Charente department in southwestern France.

== Population ==
Historical population
Year	Pop.	±% p.a.
1968	153	—
1975	117	−3.76%
1982	121	+0.48%
1990	123	+0.21%
1999	140	+1.45%
2007	125	−1.41%
2012	134	+1.40%
2017	137	+0.44%
2023	171	+3.76%
Source: INSEE

== See also ==
- Communes of the Charente department
