= Longré =

- Commune
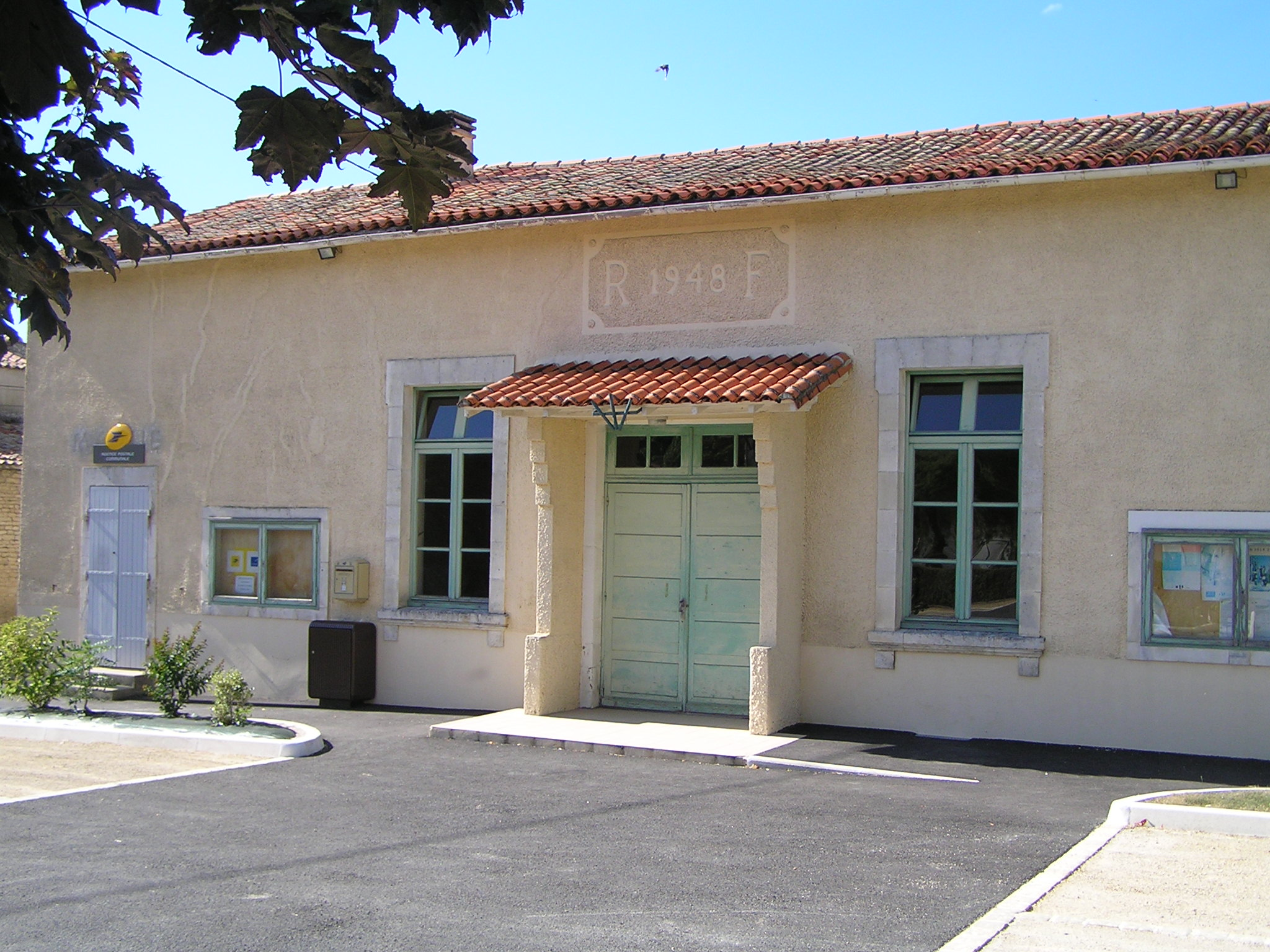
- Town hall
- Location of Longré
- Location within France Location within Nouvelle-Aquitaine
- Coordinates: 46°00′09″N 0°00′41″W
- Country: France
- Region: Nouvelle-Aquitaine
- Department: Charente
- Arrondissement: Confolens
- Canton: Charente-Nord
- Intercommunality: Val de Charente

Government
  - Mayor (2020–2026): Dany Menetaud
- Area^{1}: 14.73 km^{2} (5.69 sq mi)
- Elevation: 83 m (272 ft)
- Highest elevation: 131 m (430 ft)
- Lowest elevation: 73 m (240 ft)
- Population (2023): 193
  - Density: 13.1/km^{2} (33.9/sq mi)
- Time zone: UTC+01:00 (CET)
  - Summer (DST): UTC+02:00 (CEST)
- INSEE/Postal code: 16190 /16240
- ^{1} French Land Register data, which excludes lakes, ponds, glaciers > 1 km^{2} (0.386 sq mi or 247 acres) and river estuaries.

Longré (French pronunciation: [lɔ̃ɡʁe]) is a commune in the Charente department in southwestern France.

== Population ==
Historical population
Year	Pop.	±% p.a.
1968	325	—
1975	355	+1.27%
1982	323	−1.34%
1990	251	−3.10%
1999	216	−1.65%
2007	219	+0.17%
2012	210	−0.84%
2017	187	−2.29%
2023	193	+0.53%
Source: INSEE

== See also ==
- Communes of the Charente department
