= Condac =

- Commune
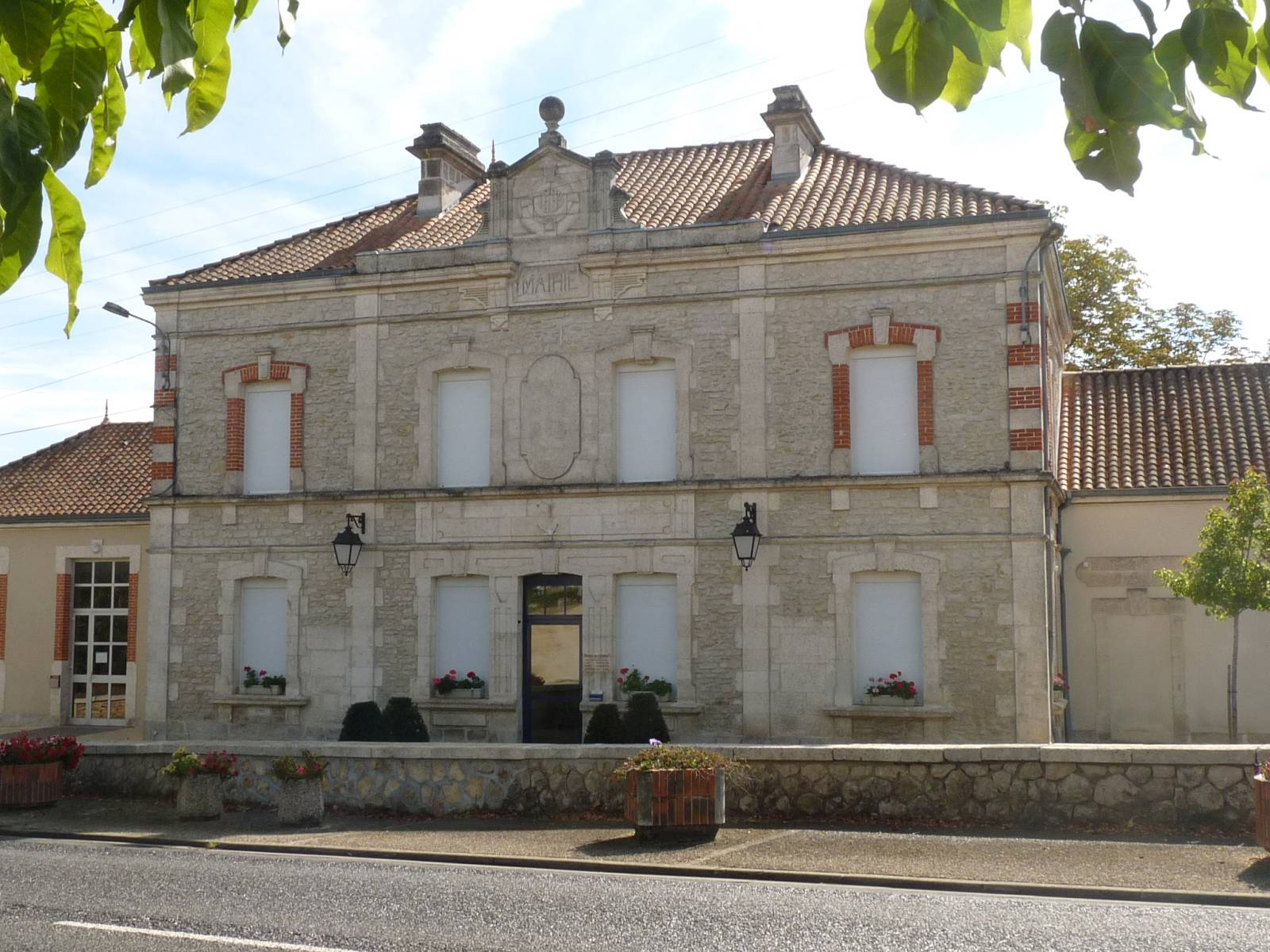
- The town hall in Condac
- Location of Condac
- Location within France Location within Nouvelle-Aquitaine
- Coordinates: 46°01′30″N 0°13′43″E
- Country: France
- Region: Nouvelle-Aquitaine
- Department: Charente
- Arrondissement: Confolens
- Canton: Charente-Nord

Government
  - Mayor (2020–2026): Christophe Demaille
- Area^{1}: 9.59 km^{2} (3.70 sq mi)
- Elevation: 85 m (279 ft)
- Highest elevation: 141 m (463 ft)
- Lowest elevation: 77 m (253 ft)
- Population (2023): 456
  - Density: 47.5/km^{2} (123/sq mi)
- Time zone: UTC+01:00 (CET)
  - Summer (DST): UTC+02:00 (CEST)
- INSEE/Postal code: 16104 /16700
- ^{1} French Land Register data, which excludes lakes, ponds, glaciers > 1 km^{2} (0.386 sq mi or 247 acres) and river estuaries.

Condac (French pronunciation: [kɔ̃dak]) is a commune in the Charente department in southwestern France.

== Population ==
Historical population
Year	Pop.	±% p.a.
1968	327	—
1975	376	+2.01%
1982	401	+0.92%
1990	429	+0.85%
1999	470	+1.02%
2007	472	+0.05%
2012	466	−0.26%
2017	477	+0.47%
2023	456	−0.75%
Source: INSEE

== See also ==
- Communes of the Charente department
