= Londigny =

- Commune
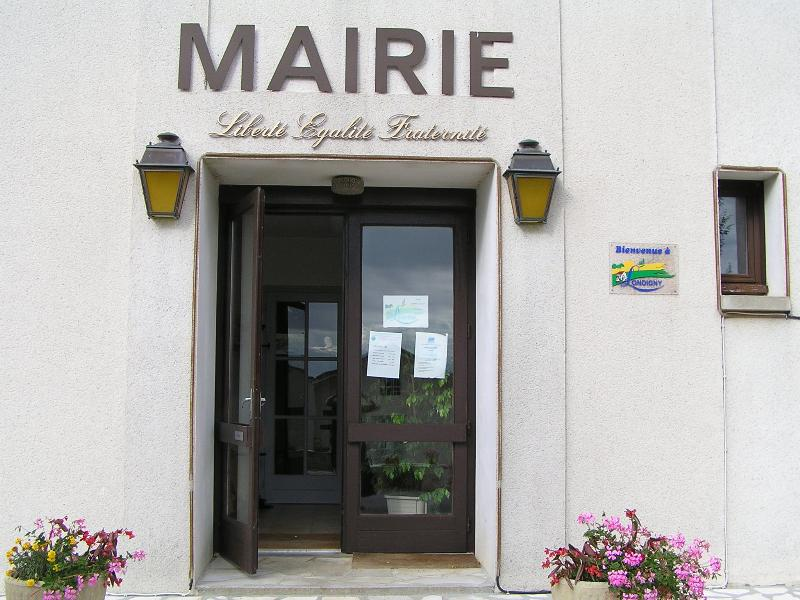
- Town hall
- Location of Londigny
- Location within France Location within Nouvelle-Aquitaine
- Coordinates: 46°05′01″N 0°08′16″E
- Country: France
- Region: Nouvelle-Aquitaine
- Department: Charente
- Arrondissement: Confolens
- Canton: Charente-Nord

Government
  - Mayor (2020–2026): Jean Pierre Ragonnaud
- Area^{1}: 9.67 km^{2} (3.73 sq mi)
- Elevation: 140 m (460 ft)
- Highest elevation: 160 m (520 ft)
- Lowest elevation: 108 m (354 ft)
- Population (2023): 237
  - Density: 24.5/km^{2} (63.5/sq mi)
- Time zone: UTC+01:00 (CET)
  - Summer (DST): UTC+02:00 (CEST)
- INSEE/Postal code: 16189 /16700
- ^{1} French Land Register data, which excludes lakes, ponds, glaciers > 1 km^{2} (0.386 sq mi or 247 acres) and river estuaries.

Londigny (French pronunciation: [lɔ̃diɲi]) is a commune in the Charente department in southwestern France.

== Population ==
Historical population
Year	Pop.	±% p.a.
1968	278	—
1975	242	−1.96%
1982	242	+0.00%
1990	228	−0.74%
1999	219	−0.45%
2007	244	+1.36%
2012	249	+0.41%
2017	251	+0.16%
2023	237	−0.95%
Source: INSEE

== See also ==
- Communes of the Charente department
