= Saint-Fraigne =

- Commune
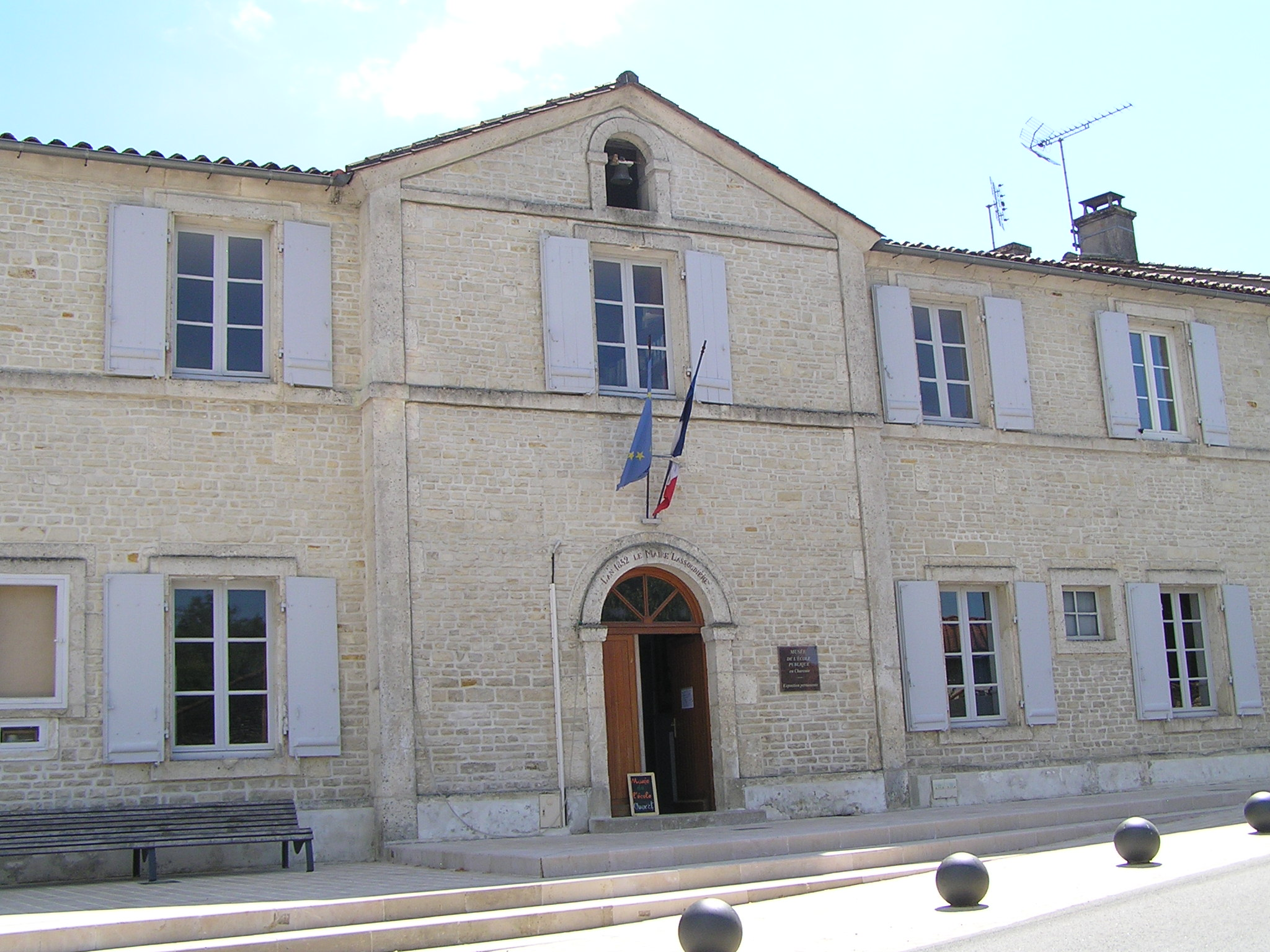
- Town hall
- Location of Saint-Fraigne
- Location within France Location within Nouvelle-Aquitaine
- Coordinates: 45°57′13″N 0°00′35″W
- Country: France
- Region: Nouvelle-Aquitaine
- Department: Charente
- Arrondissement: Confolens
- Canton: Charente-Nord

Government
  - Mayor (2022–2026): Céline Marcelin
- Area^{1}: 32.10 km^{2} (12.39 sq mi)
- Elevation: 75 m (246 ft)
- Highest elevation: 127 m (417 ft)
- Lowest elevation: 66 m (217 ft)
- Population (2023): 427
  - Density: 13.3/km^{2} (34.5/sq mi)
- Time zone: UTC+01:00 (CET)
  - Summer (DST): UTC+02:00 (CEST)
- INSEE/Postal code: 16317 /16140
- ^{1} French Land Register data, which excludes lakes, ponds, glaciers > 1 km^{2} (0.386 sq mi or 247 acres) and river estuaries.

Saint-Fraigne (French pronunciation: [sɛ̃ fʁɛɲ]) is a commune in the Charente department in southwestern France.

== Population ==
Historical population
Year	Pop.	±% p.a.
1968	562	—
1975	500	−1.66%
1982	484	−0.46%
1990	472	−0.31%
1999	426	−1.13%
2007	463	+1.05%
2012	451	−0.52%
2017	442	−0.40%
2023	427	−0.57%
Source: INSEE

== See also ==
- Communes of the Charente department
