= Bioussac =

- Commune
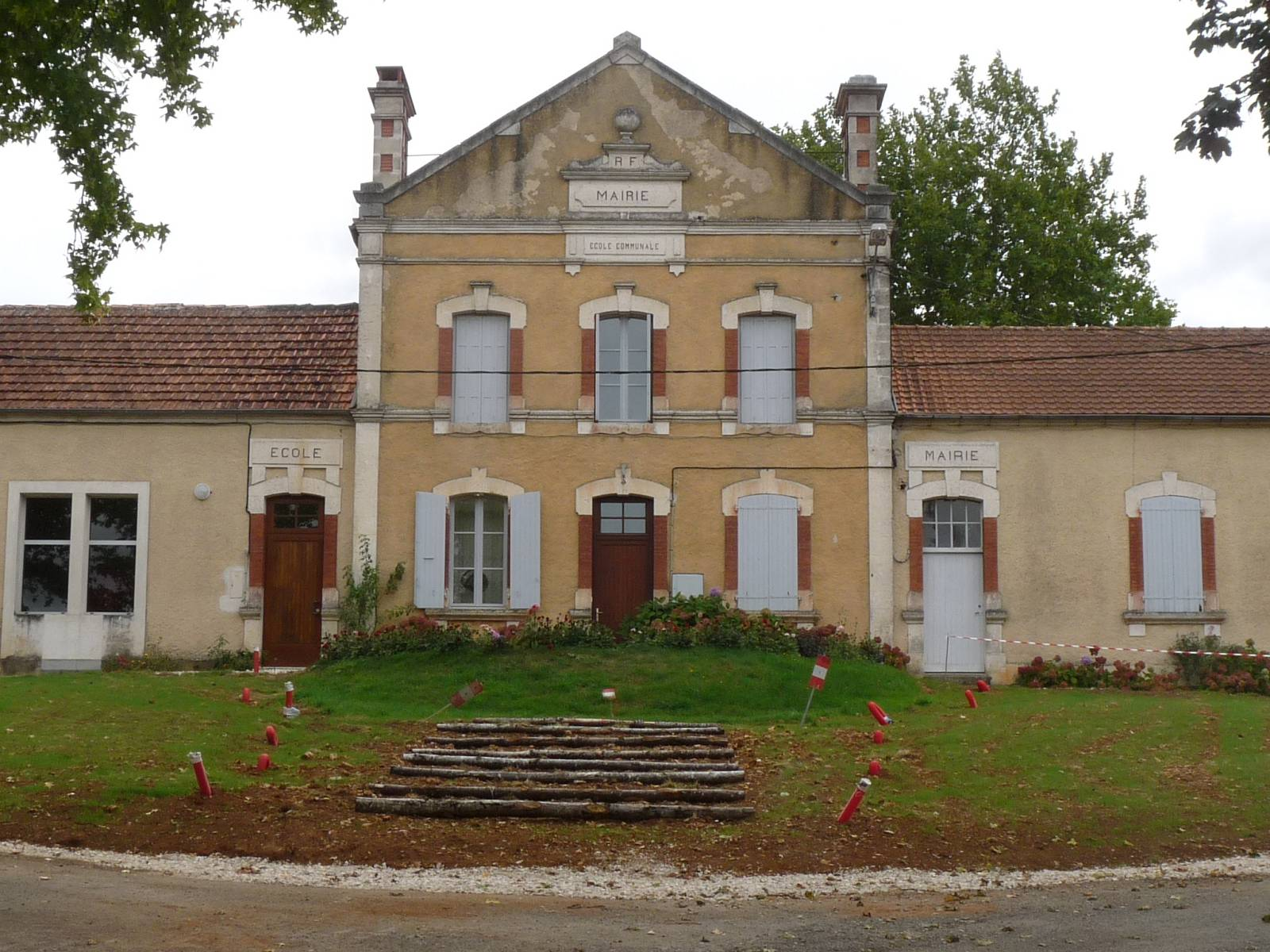
- Town hall
- Location of Bioussac
- Location within France Location within Nouvelle-Aquitaine
- Coordinates: 46°01′56″N 0°16′32″E
- Country: France
- Region: Nouvelle-Aquitaine
- Department: Charente
- Arrondissement: Confolens
- Canton: Charente-Nord
- Intercommunality: Val de Charente

Government
  - Mayor (2020–2026): Pierre Poux
- Area^{1}: 15.64 km^{2} (6.04 sq mi)
- Elevation: 110 m (360 ft)
- Highest elevation: 164 m (538 ft)
- Lowest elevation: 82 m (269 ft)
- Population (2023): 206
  - Density: 13.2/km^{2} (34.1/sq mi)
- Time zone: UTC+01:00 (CET)
  - Summer (DST): UTC+02:00 (CEST)
- INSEE/Postal code: 16044 /16700
- ^{1} French Land Register data, which excludes lakes, ponds, glaciers > 1 km^{2} (0.386 sq mi or 247 acres) and river estuaries.

Bioussac (French pronunciation: [bjusak]) is a commune in the Charente department in southwestern France.

== Population ==
Historical population
| Year | Pop. | ±% p.a. |
|---|---|---|
| 1968 | 383 | — |
| 1975 | 311 | −2.93% |
| 1982 | 224 | −4.58% |
| 1990 | 244 | +1.07% |
| 1999 | 226 | −0.85% |
| 2007 | 228 | +0.11% |
| 2012 | 225 | −0.26% |
| 2017 | 227 | +0.18% |
| 2023 | 206 | −1.60% |
Source: INSEE

== See also ==
- Communes of the Charente department
