= Raix =

- Commune
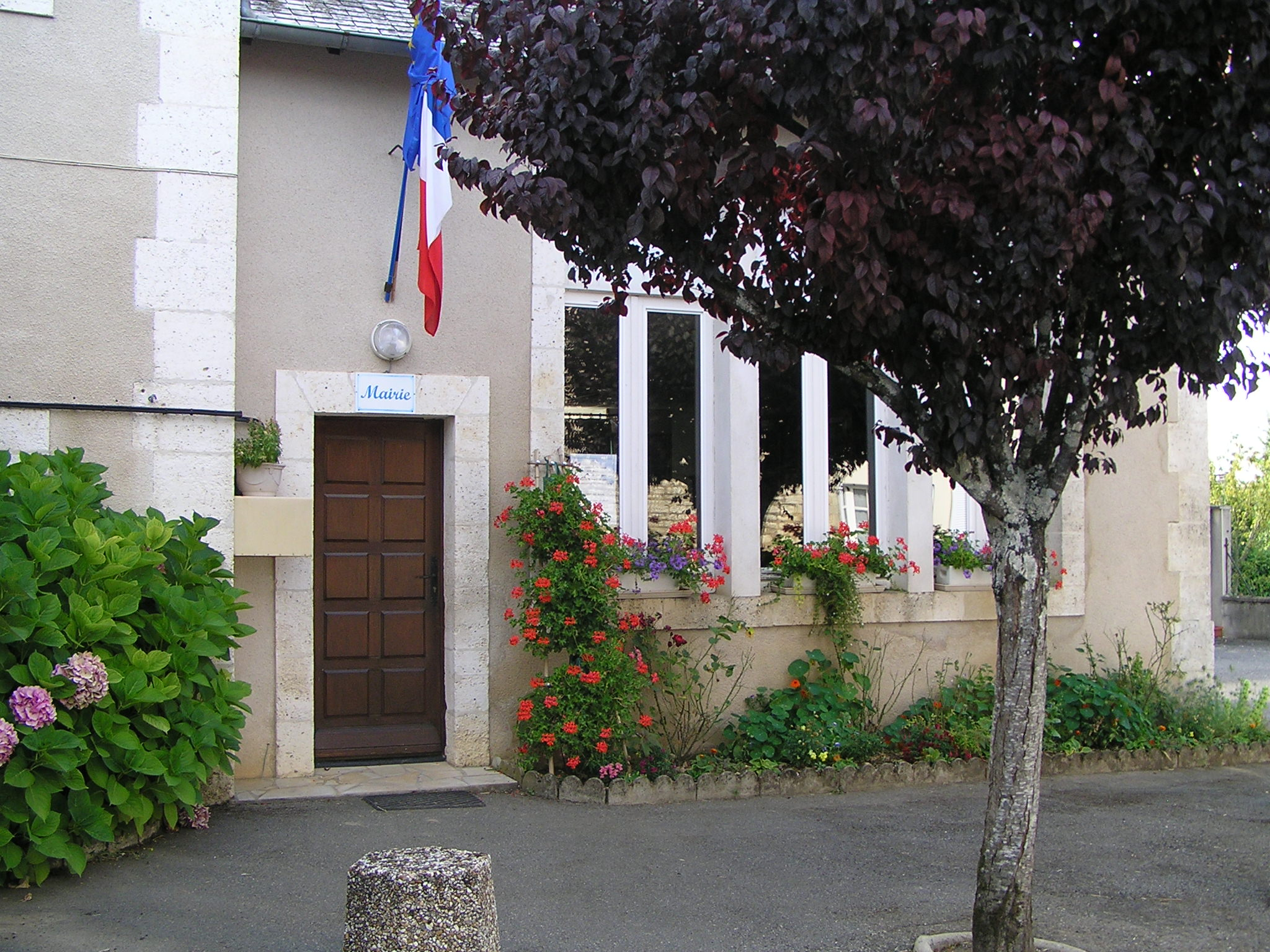
- Town hall
- Location of Raix
- Location within France Location within Nouvelle-Aquitaine
- Coordinates: 46°00′06″N 0°06′46″E
- Country: France
- Region: Nouvelle-Aquitaine
- Department: Charente
- Arrondissement: Confolens
- Canton: Charente-Nord
- Intercommunality: Val de Charente

Government
  - Mayor (2020–2026): Patrick Baroni
- Area^{1}: 6.87 km^{2} (2.65 sq mi)
- Elevation: 320 m (1,050 ft)
- Highest elevation: 146 m (479 ft)
- Lowest elevation: 89 m (292 ft)
- Population (2023): 134
  - Density: 19.5/km^{2} (50.5/sq mi)
- Time zone: UTC+01:00 (CET)
  - Summer (DST): UTC+02:00 (CEST)
- INSEE/Postal code: 16273 /16240
- ^{1} French Land Register data, which excludes lakes, ponds, glaciers > 1 km^{2} (0.386 sq mi or 247 acres) and river estuaries.

Raix is a commune in the Charente department in southwestern France.

== Population ==
Historical population
Year	Pop.	±% p.a.
1968	170	—
1975	171	+0.08%
1982	185	+1.13%
1990	152	−2.43%
1999	150	−0.15%
2007	148	−0.17%
2012	148	+0.00%
2017	141	−0.96%
2023	134	−0.85%
Source: INSEE

== See also ==
- Communes of the Charente department
