= Lupsault =

- Commune
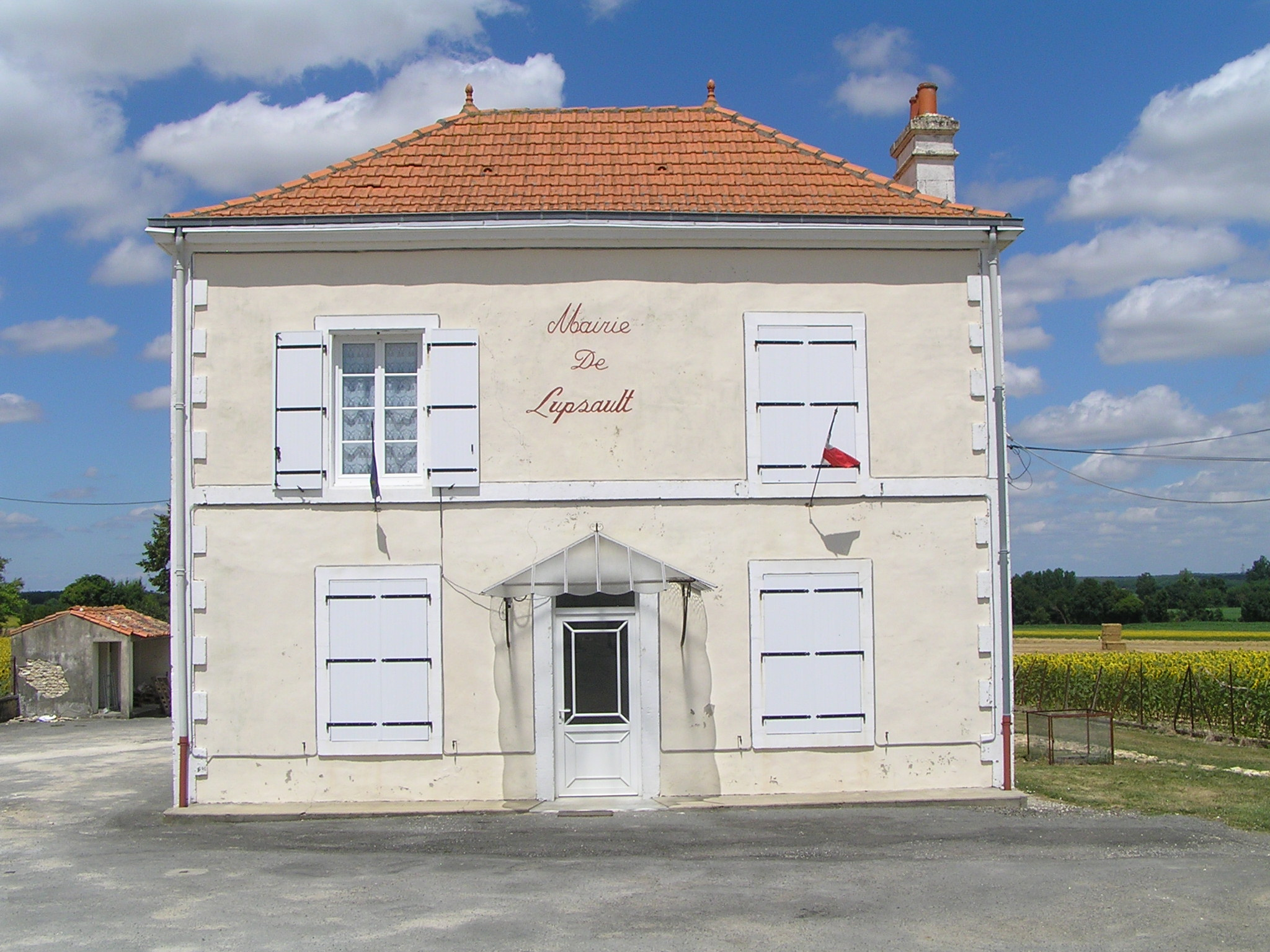
- Town hall

- Coat of arms
- Location of Lupsault
- Location within France Location within Nouvelle-Aquitaine
- Coordinates: 45°56′34″N 0°04′26″W
- Country: France
- Region: Nouvelle-Aquitaine
- Department: Charente
- Arrondissement: Confolens
- Canton: Charente-Nord
- Intercommunality: Cœur de Charente

Government
  - Mayor (2020–2026): Jean-Louis Durand
- Area^{1}: 11.47 km^{2} (4.43 sq mi)
- Elevation: 96 m (315 ft)
- Highest elevation: 139 m (456 ft)
- Lowest elevation: 75 m (246 ft)
- Population (2023): 109
  - Density: 9.50/km^{2} (24.6/sq mi)
- Time zone: UTC+01:00 (CET)
  - Summer (DST): UTC+02:00 (CEST)
- INSEE/Postal code: 16194 /16140
- ^{1} French Land Register data, which excludes lakes, ponds, glaciers > 1 km^{2} (0.386 sq mi or 247 acres) and river estuaries.

Lupsault (French pronunciation: [lypso]) is a commune in the Charente department in southwestern France.

== Population ==
Historical population
Year	Pop.	±% p.a.
1968	228	—
1975	192	−2.43%
1982	151	−3.37%
1990	160	+0.73%
1999	132	−2.11%
2007	125	−0.68%
2012	106	−3.24%
2017	99	−1.36%
2023	109	+1.62%
Source: INSEE

== See also ==
- Communes of the Charente department
