= Barro, Charente =

Barro
- Commune
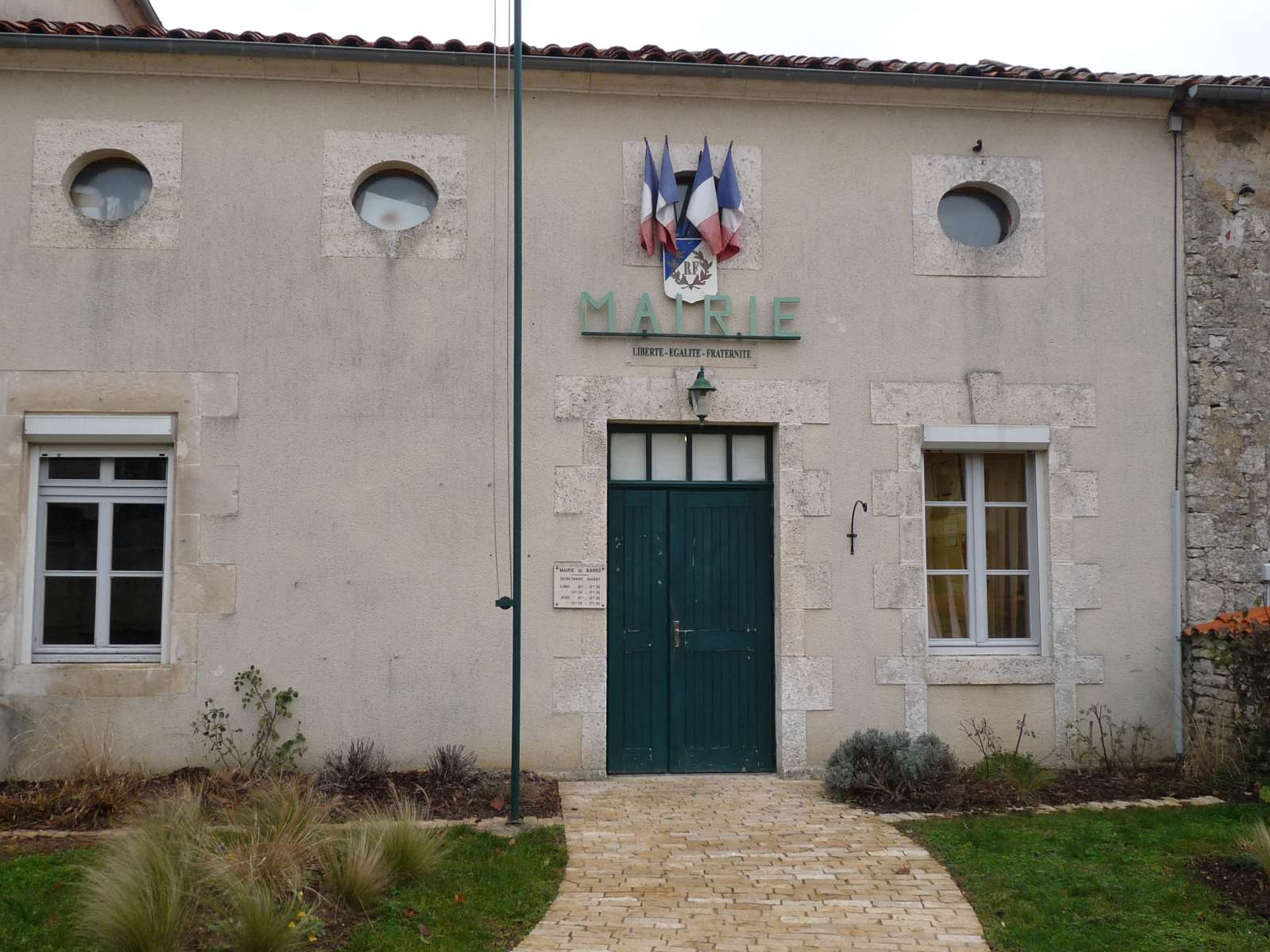
- Town hall
- Location of Barro
- Location within France Location within Nouvelle-Aquitaine
- Coordinates: 46°00′05″N 0°13′39″E
- Country: France
- Region: Nouvelle-Aquitaine
- Department: Charente
- Arrondissement: Confolens
- Canton: Charente-Nord
- Intercommunality: Val de Charente

Government
  - Mayor (2020–2026): José Dupuis
- Area^{1}: 10.65 km^{2} (4.11 sq mi)
- Elevation: 85 m (279 ft)
- Highest elevation: 164 m (538 ft)
- Lowest elevation: 77 m (253 ft)
- Population (2023): 413
  - Density: 38.8/km^{2} (100/sq mi)
- Time zone: UTC+01:00 (CET)
  - Summer (DST): UTC+02:00 (CEST)
- INSEE/Postal code: 16031 /16700
- ^{1} French Land Register data, which excludes lakes, ponds, glaciers > 1 km^{2} (0.386 sq mi or 247 acres) and river estuaries.

Barro (French pronunciation: [baʁo]) is a commune in the Charente department in southwestern France.

== Population ==
Historical population
Year	Pop.	±% p.a.
1968	223	—
1975	206	−1.13%
1982	231	+1.65%
1990	258	+1.39%
1999	265	+0.30%
2007	343	+3.28%
2012	379	+2.02%
2017	413	+1.73%
2023	413	+0.00%
Source: INSEE

== See also ==
- Communes of the Charente department
