= La Chèvrerie =

- Commune
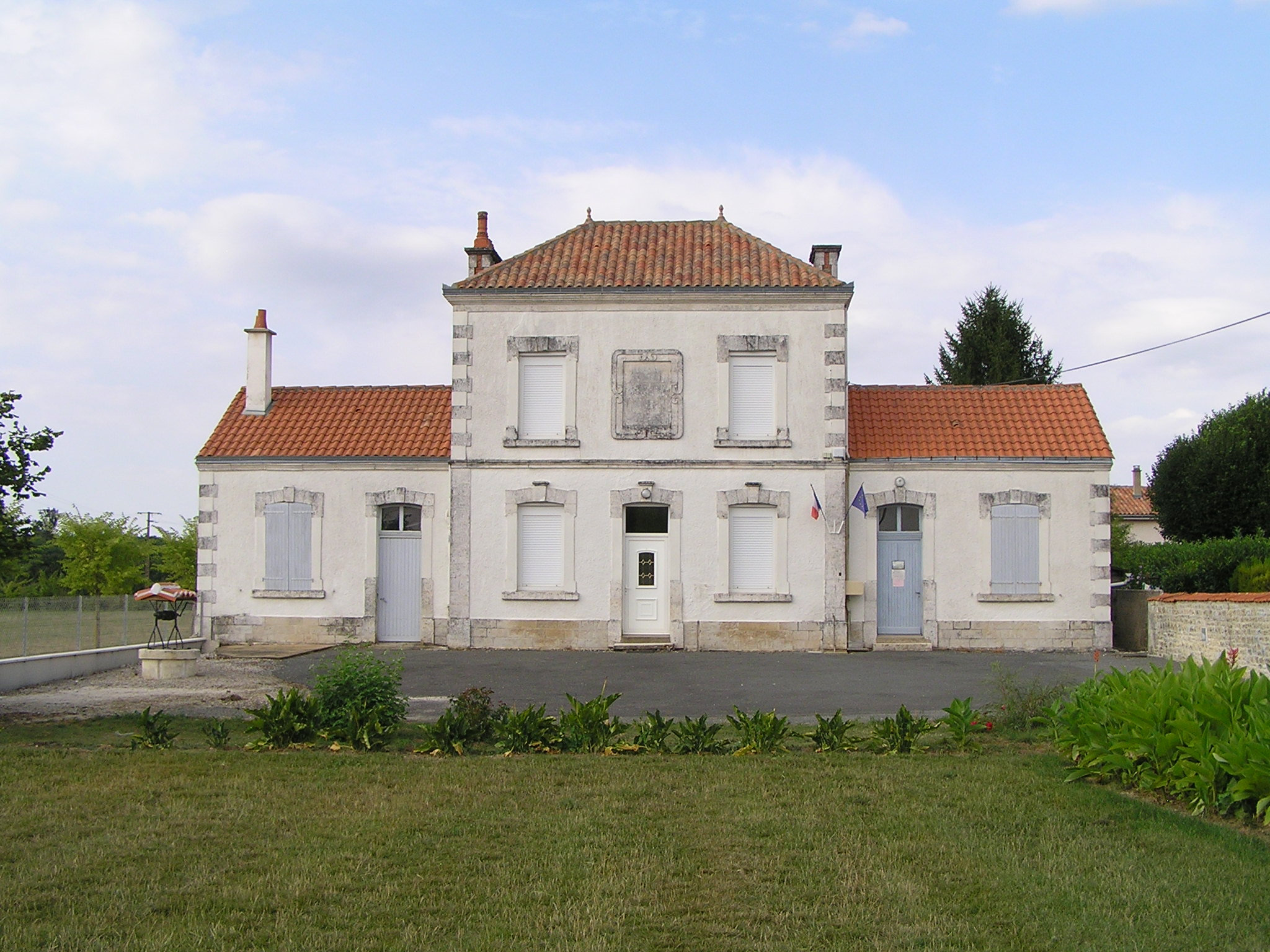
- Town hall
- Location of La Chèvrerie
- Location within France Location within Nouvelle-Aquitaine
- Coordinates: 46°02′51″N 0°08′21″E
- Country: France
- Region: Nouvelle-Aquitaine
- Department: Charente
- Arrondissement: Confolens
- Canton: Charente-Nord
- Intercommunality: Val de Charente

Government
  - Mayor (2020–2026): Bruno Pagnoux
- Area^{1}: 4.61 km^{2} (1.78 sq mi)
- Elevation: 126 m (413 ft)
- Highest elevation: 134 m (440 ft)
- Lowest elevation: 109 m (358 ft)
- Population (2023): 136
  - Density: 29.5/km^{2} (76.4/sq mi)
- Time zone: UTC+01:00 (CET)
  - Summer (DST): UTC+02:00 (CEST)
- INSEE/Postal code: 16098 /16240
- ^{1} French Land Register data, which excludes lakes, ponds, glaciers > 1 km^{2} (0.386 sq mi or 247 acres) and river estuaries.

La Chèvrerie (French pronunciation: [la ʃɛvʁəʁi]) is a commune in the Charente department in southwestern France.

== Population ==
Historical population
Year	Pop.	±% p.a.
1968	140	—
1975	152	+1.18%
1982	168	+1.44%
1990	149	−1.49%
1999	152	+0.22%
2007	151	−0.08%
2012	132	−2.65%
2017	140	+1.18%
2023	136	−0.48%
Source: INSEE

== See also ==
- Communes of the Charente department
