= Oradour, Charente =

Oradour
- Commune
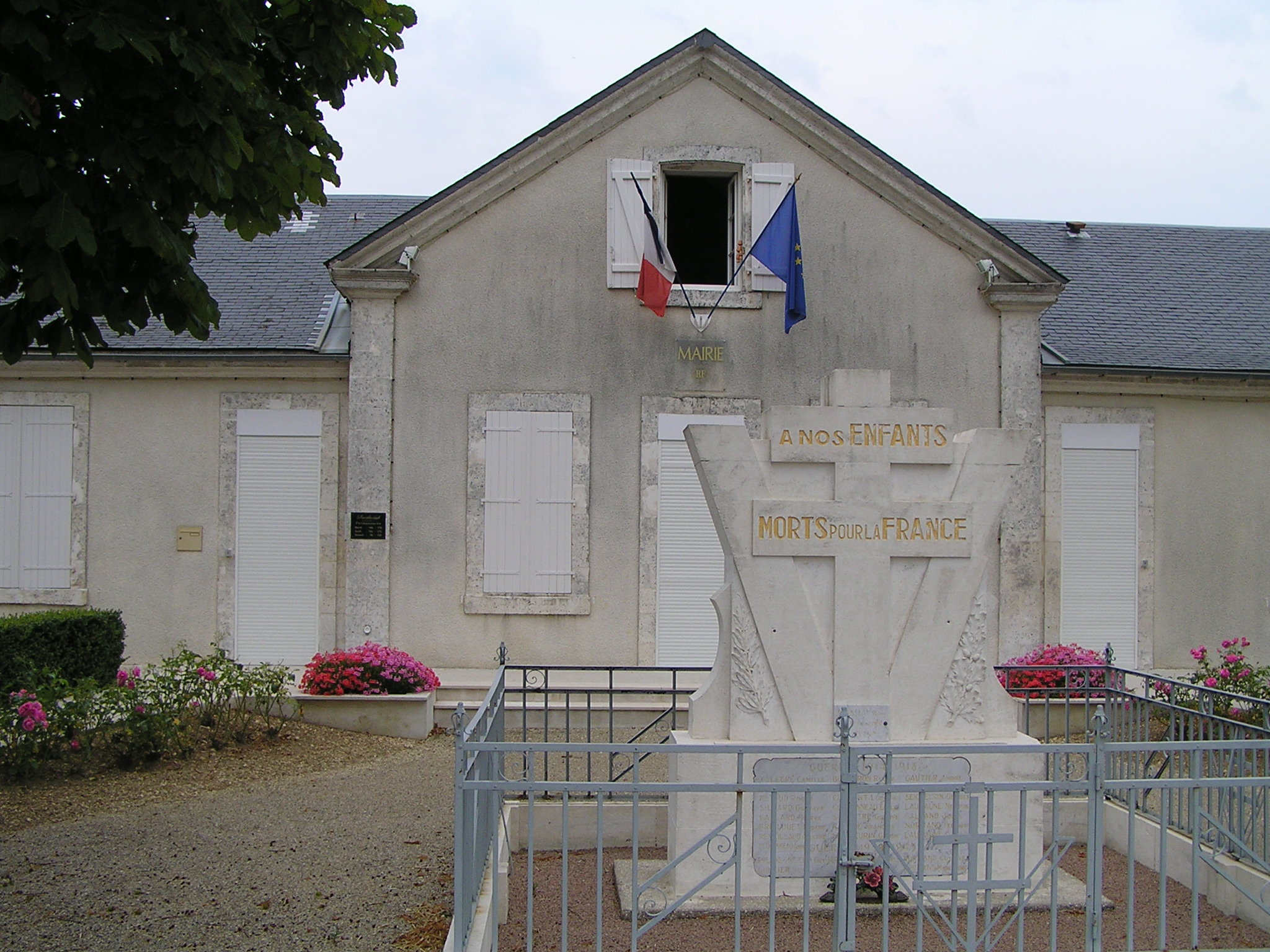
- Town hall and war memorial
- Location of Oradour
- Location within France Location within Nouvelle-Aquitaine
- Coordinates: 45°54′27″N 0°01′50″W
- Country: France
- Region: Nouvelle-Aquitaine
- Department: Charente
- Arrondissement: Confolens
- Canton: Charente-Nord
- Intercommunality: Cœur de Charente

Government
  - Mayor (2020–2026): Didier Lavergne
- Area^{1}: 14.40 km^{2} (5.56 sq mi)
- Elevation: 77 m (253 ft)
- Highest elevation: 120 m (390 ft)
- Lowest elevation: 65 m (213 ft)
- Population (2023): 163
  - Density: 11.3/km^{2} (29.3/sq mi)
- Time zone: UTC+01:00 (CET)
  - Summer (DST): UTC+02:00 (CEST)
- INSEE/Postal code: 16248 /16140
- ^{1} French Land Register data, which excludes lakes, ponds, glaciers > 1 km^{2} (0.386 sq mi or 247 acres) and river estuaries.

Oradour (French pronunciation: [ɔʁaduʁ]), commonly called Oradour-d'Aigre, is a commune in the Charente department in southwestern France.

== Population ==
Historical population
Year	Pop.	±% p.a.
1968	296	—
1975	259	−1.89%
1982	250	−0.50%
1990	225	−1.31%
1999	200	−1.30%
2007	203	+0.19%
2012	190	−1.31%
2017	164	−2.90%
2023	163	−0.10%
Source: INSEE

== See also ==
- Communes of the Charente department
