= La Forêt-de-Tessé =

- Commune
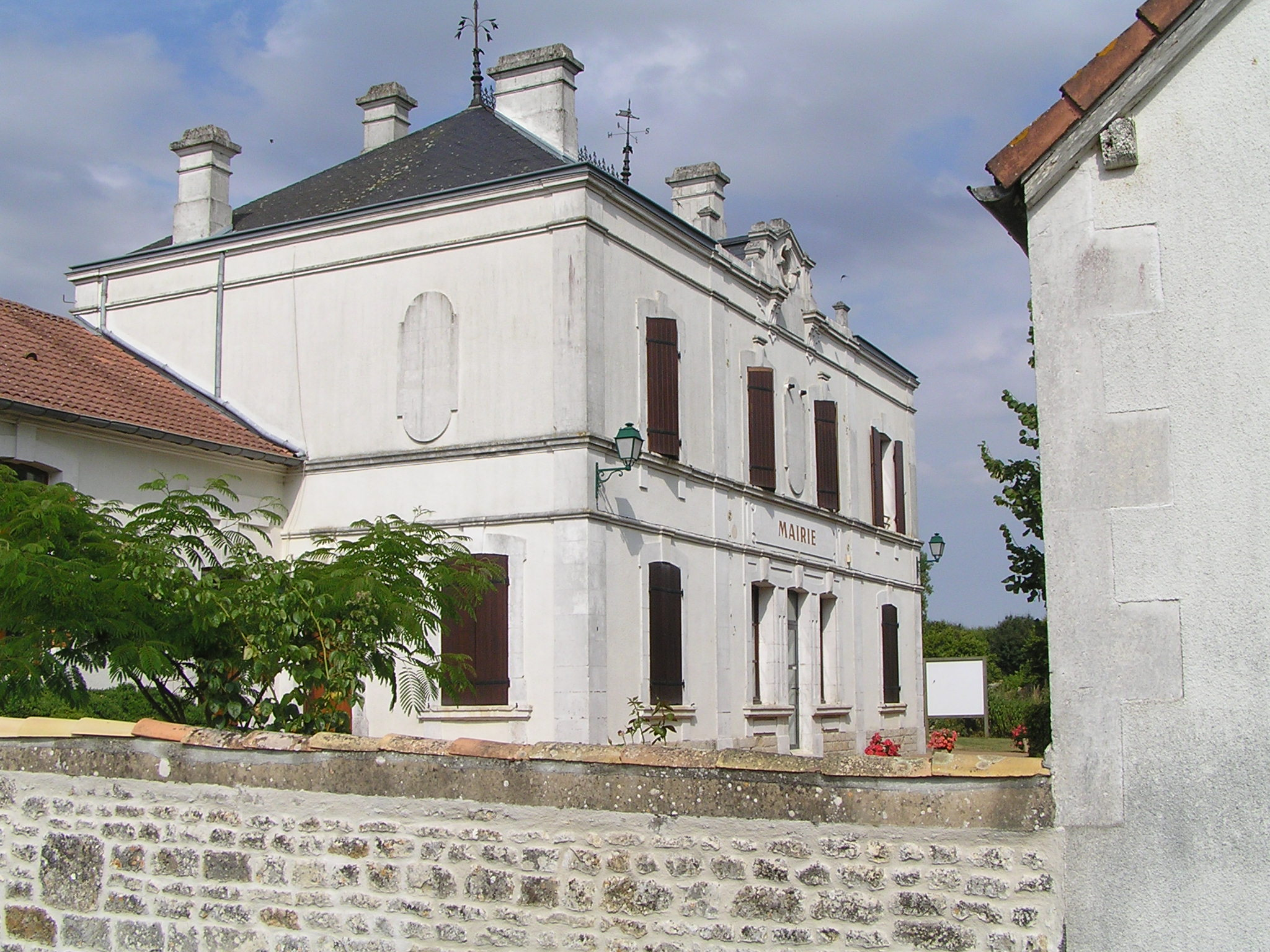
- Town hall
- Location of La Forêt-de-Tessé
- Location within France Location within Nouvelle-Aquitaine
- Coordinates: 46°04′52″N 0°05′06″E
- Country: France
- Region: Nouvelle-Aquitaine
- Department: Charente
- Arrondissement: Confolens
- Canton: Charente-Nord

Government
  - Mayor (2020–2026): Gérard Le Henanff
- Area^{1}: 10.70 km^{2} (4.13 sq mi)
- Elevation: 143 m (469 ft)
- Highest elevation: 158 m (518 ft)
- Lowest elevation: 120 m (390 ft)
- Population (2023): 206
  - Density: 19.3/km^{2} (49.9/sq mi)
- Time zone: UTC+01:00 (CET)
  - Summer (DST): UTC+02:00 (CEST)
- INSEE/Postal code: 16142 /16240
- ^{1} French Land Register data, which excludes lakes, ponds, glaciers > 1 km^{2} (0.386 sq mi or 247 acres) and river estuaries.

La Forêt-de-Tessé (French pronunciation: [la fɔʁɛ də tɛse]) commune in the Charente department in southwestern France.

== Population ==
Historical population
Year	Pop.	±% p.a.
1968	284	—
1975	249	−1.86%
1982	222	−1.63%
1990	212	−0.57%
1999	195	−0.92%
2007	204	+0.57%
2012	205	+0.10%
2017	189	−1.61%
2023	206	+1.45%
Source: INSEE

== See also ==
- Communes of the Charente department
