= Barbezières =

- Commune
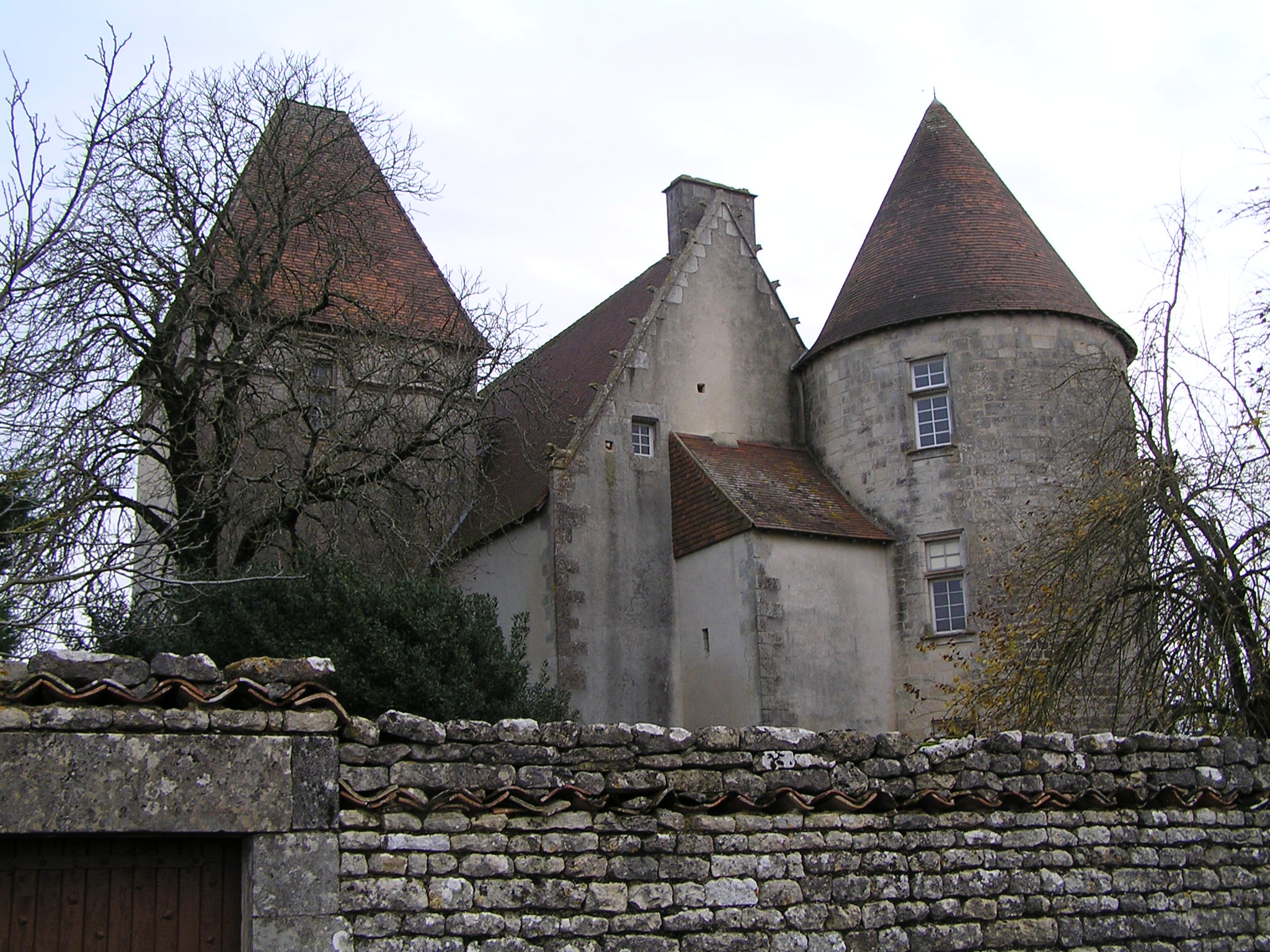
- Chateau
- Location of Barbezières
- Location within France Location within Nouvelle-Aquitaine
- Coordinates: 45°54′43″N 0°05′21″W
- Country: France
- Region: Nouvelle-Aquitaine
- Department: Charente
- Arrondissement: Confolens
- Canton: Charente-Nord
- Intercommunality: Cœur de Charente

Government
  - Mayor (2020–2026): Sylvie Boizumault
- Area^{1}: 9.29 km^{2} (3.59 sq mi)
- Highest elevation: 141 m (463 ft)
- Lowest elevation: 79 m (259 ft)
- Population (2023): 134
  - Density: 14.4/km^{2} (37.4/sq mi)
- Time zone: UTC+01:00 (CET)
  - Summer (DST): UTC+02:00 (CEST)
- INSEE/Postal code: 16027 /16140
- ^{1} French Land Register data, which excludes lakes, ponds, glaciers > 1 km^{2} (0.386 sq mi or 247 acres) and river estuaries.

Barbezières (French pronunciation: [baʁbəzjɛʁ]) is a commune in the Charente department in southwestern France.

== Population ==
Historical population
Year	Pop.	±% p.a.
1968	200	—
1975	186	−1.03%
1982	167	−1.53%
1990	157	−0.77%
1999	147	−0.73%
2007	125	−2.01%
2012	124	−0.16%
2017	125	+0.16%
2023	134	+1.17%
Source: INSEE

== See also ==
- Communes of the Charente department
