= Souvigné, Charente =

Souvigné
- Commune
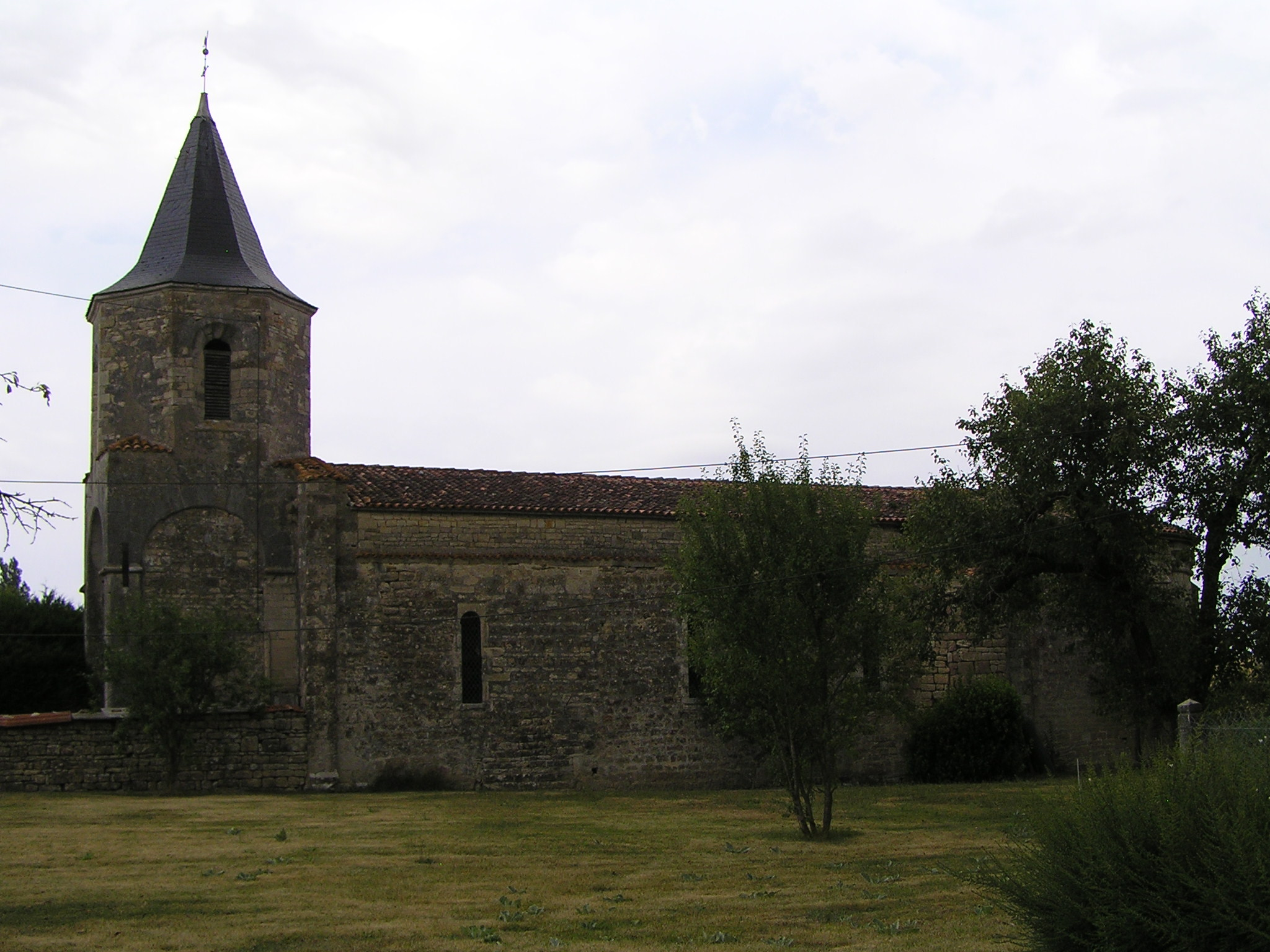
- The church in Souvigné

- Coat of arms
- Location of Souvigné
- Location within France Location within Nouvelle-Aquitaine
- Coordinates: 45°58′20″N 0°03′31″E
- Country: France
- Region: Nouvelle-Aquitaine
- Department: Charente
- Arrondissement: Confolens
- Canton: Charente-Nord
- Intercommunality: Val de Charente

Government
  - Mayor (2020–2026): Jérôme Audoin
- Area^{1}: 10.37 km^{2} (4.00 sq mi)
- Elevation: 130 m (430 ft)
- Highest elevation: 129 m (423 ft)
- Lowest elevation: 80 m (260 ft)
- Population (2023): 182
  - Density: 17.6/km^{2} (45.5/sq mi)
- Time zone: UTC+01:00 (CET)
  - Summer (DST): UTC+02:00 (CEST)
- INSEE/Postal code: 16373 /16240
- ^{1} French Land Register data, which excludes lakes, ponds, glaciers > 1 km^{2} (0.386 sq mi or 247 acres) and river estuaries.

Souvigné (French pronunciation: [suviɲe]) is a commune in the Charente department in southwestern France.

== Population ==
Historical population
Year	Pop.	±% p.a.
1968	307	—
1975	268	−1.92%
1982	235	−1.86%
1990	227	−0.43%
1999	233	+0.29%
2007	242	+0.47%
2012	231	−0.93%
2017	208	−2.08%
2023	182	−2.20%
Source: INSEE

== See also ==
- Communes of the Charente department
