= La Magdeleine, Charente =

La Magdeleine
- Commune
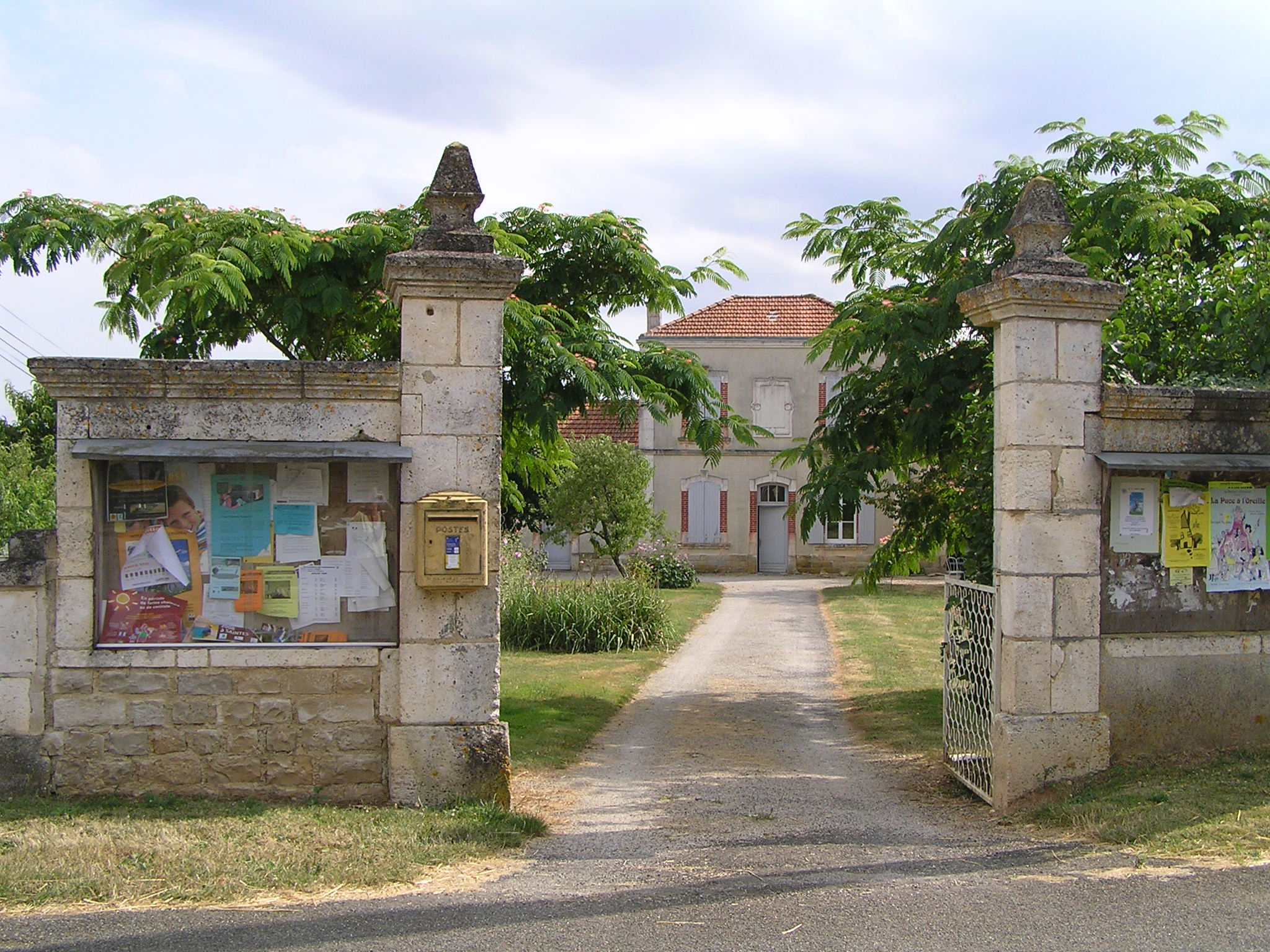
- Gate of the town hall
- Location of La Magdeleine
- Location within France Location within Nouvelle-Aquitaine
- Coordinates: 46°03′06″N 0°04′27″E
- Country: France
- Region: Nouvelle-Aquitaine
- Department: Charente
- Arrondissement: Confolens
- Canton: Charente-Nord
- Intercommunality: Val de Charente

Government
  - Mayor (2020–2026): Monique Lericolais
- Area^{1}: 6.68 km^{2} (2.58 sq mi)
- Elevation: 130 m (430 ft)
- Highest elevation: 159 m (522 ft)
- Lowest elevation: 128 m (420 ft)
- Population (2023): 118
  - Density: 17.7/km^{2} (45.8/sq mi)
- Time zone: UTC+01:00 (CET)
  - Summer (DST): UTC+02:00 (CEST)
- INSEE/Postal code: 16197 /16240
- ^{1} French Land Register data, which excludes lakes, ponds, glaciers > 1 km^{2} (0.386 sq mi or 247 acres) and river estuaries.

La Magdeleine (French pronunciation: [la maɡdəlɛn]) is a commune in the Charente department in southwestern France.

== Population ==
Historical population
Year	Pop.	±% p.a.
1968	153	—
1975	135	−1.77%
1982	129	−0.65%
1990	125	−0.39%
1999	119	−0.55%
2007	119	+0.00%
2012	134	+2.40%
2017	114	−3.18%
2023	118	+0.58%
Source: INSEE

== See also ==
- Communes of the Charente department
