= Les Gours =

- Commune
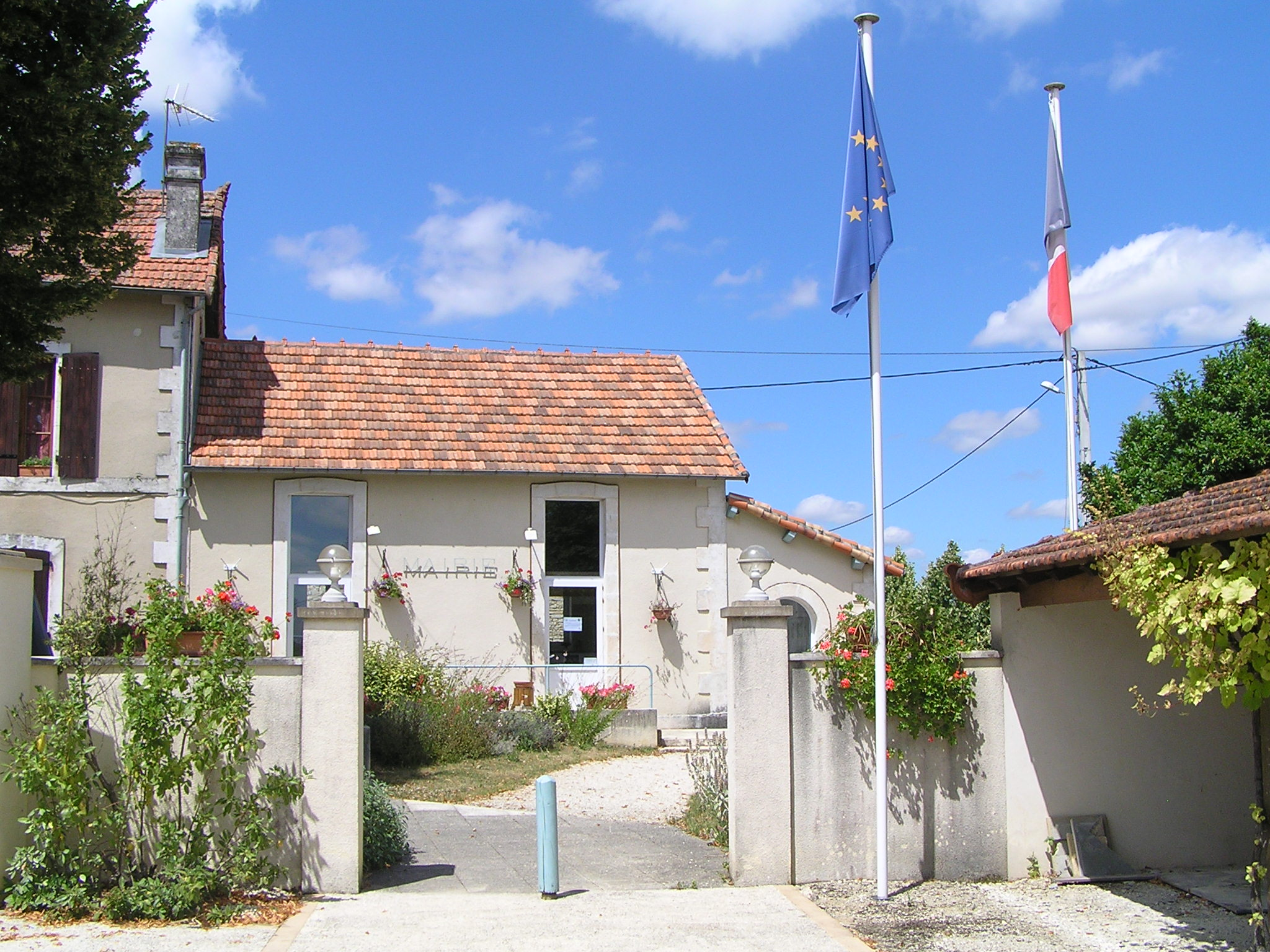
- Town hall
- Location of Les Gours
- Location within France Location within Nouvelle-Aquitaine
- Coordinates: 45°57′45″N 0°03′57″W
- Country: France
- Region: Nouvelle-Aquitaine
- Department: Charente
- Arrondissement: Confolens
- Canton: Charente-Nord

Government
  - Mayor (2020–2026): Didier Texier
- Area^{1}: 11.42 km^{2} (4.41 sq mi)
- Elevation: 85 m (279 ft)
- Highest elevation: 119 m (390 ft)
- Lowest elevation: 77 m (253 ft)
- Population (2023): 91
  - Density: 8.0/km^{2} (21/sq mi)
- Time zone: UTC+01:00 (CET)
  - Summer (DST): UTC+02:00 (CEST)
- INSEE/Postal code: 16155 /16140
- ^{1} French Land Register data, which excludes lakes, ponds, glaciers > 1 km^{2} (0.386 sq mi or 247 acres) and river estuaries.

Les Gours (French pronunciation: [le ɡuʁ]) is a commune in the Charente department in southwestern France.

== Population ==
Historical population
Year	Pop.	±% p.a.
1968	189	—
1975	163	−2.09%
1982	143	−1.85%
1990	142	−0.09%
1999	144	+0.16%
2007	128	−1.46%
2012	125	−0.47%
2017	108	−2.88%
2023	91	−2.81%
Source: INSEE

== See also ==
- Communes of the Charente department
