= Montjean, Charente =

Montjean
- Commune
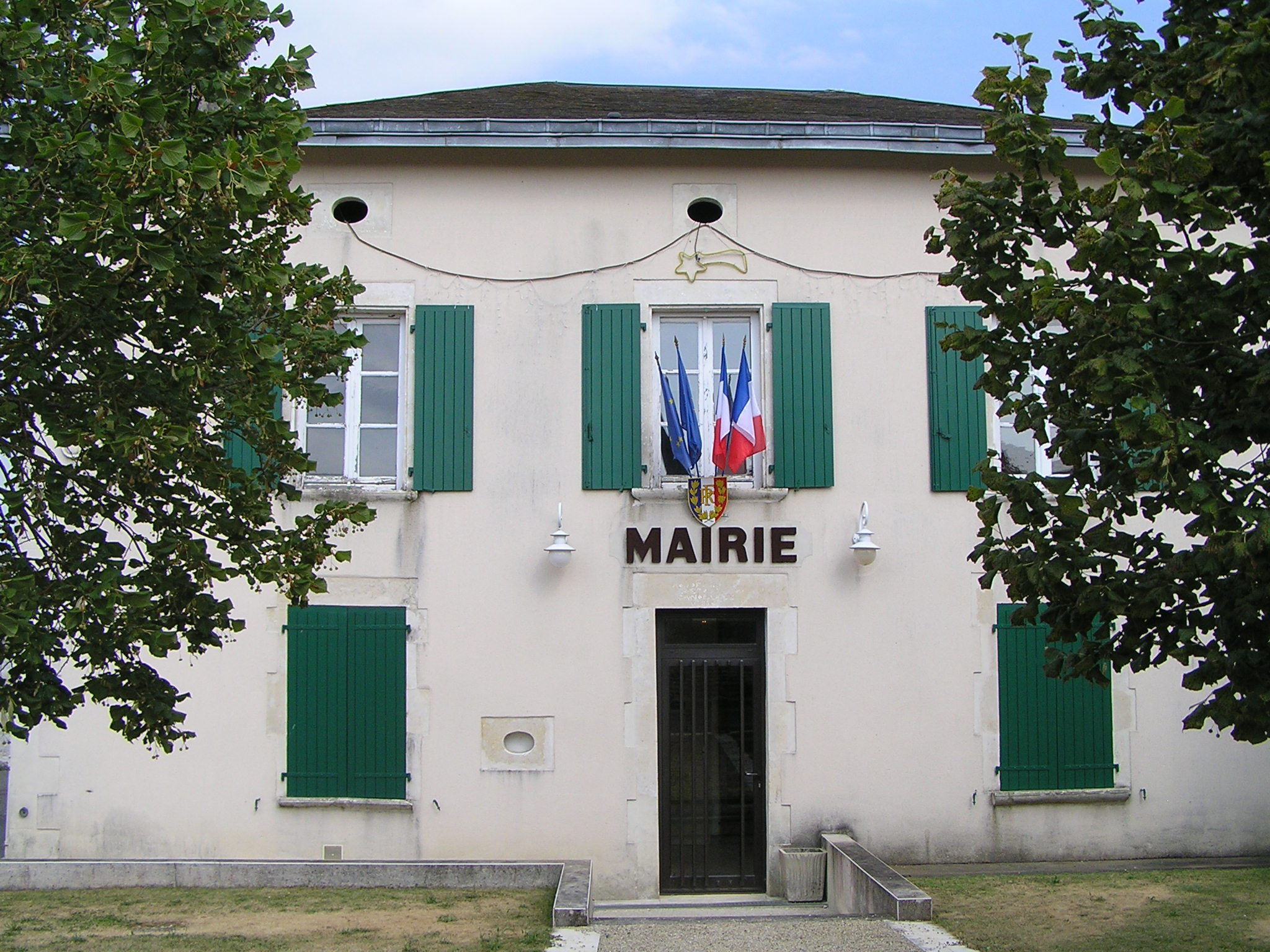
- Town hall
- Location of Montjean
- Location within France Location within Nouvelle-Aquitaine
- Coordinates: 46°05′18″N 0°07′14″E
- Country: France
- Region: Nouvelle-Aquitaine
- Department: Charente
- Arrondissement: Confolens
- Canton: Charente-Nord

Government
  - Mayor (2020–2026): Pascal Barret
- Area^{1}: 8.01 km^{2} (3.09 sq mi)
- Elevation: 157 m (515 ft)
- Highest elevation: 149 m (489 ft)
- Lowest elevation: 113 m (371 ft)
- Population (2023): 237
  - Density: 29.6/km^{2} (76.6/sq mi)
- Time zone: UTC+01:00 (CET)
  - Summer (DST): UTC+02:00 (CEST)
- INSEE/Postal code: 16229 /16240
- ^{1} French Land Register data, which excludes lakes, ponds, glaciers > 1 km^{2} (0.386 sq mi or 247 acres) and river estuaries.

Montjean (French pronunciation: [mɔ̃ʒɑ̃]) is a commune in the Charente department in southwestern France.

== Population ==
Historical population
Year	Pop.	±% p.a.
1968	322	—
1975	297	−1.15%
1982	291	−0.29%
1990	272	−0.84%
1999	262	−0.42%
2007	264	+0.10%
2012	253	−0.85%
2017	236	−1.38%
2023	237	+0.07%
Source: INSEE

== See also ==
- Communes of the Charente department
