= Nieuil =

- Commune
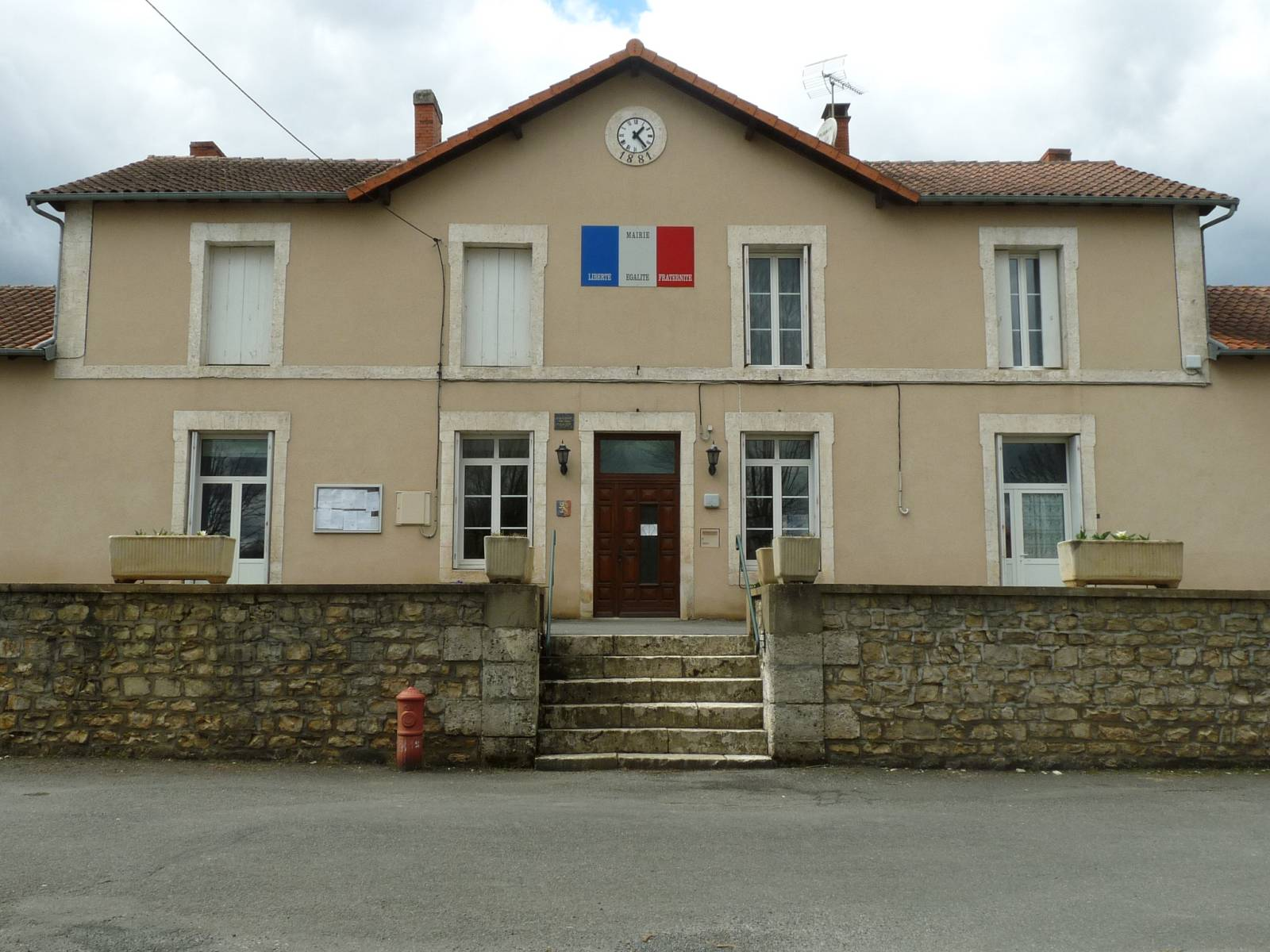
- Town hall
- Location of Nieuil
- Location within France Location within Nouvelle-Aquitaine
- Coordinates: 45°52′47″N 0°30′08″E
- Country: France
- Region: Nouvelle-Aquitaine
- Department: Charente
- Arrondissement: Confolens
- Canton: Charente-Bonnieure
- Intercommunality: Charente Limousine

Government
  - Mayor (2020–2026): Laurent Sellier
- Area^{1}: 23.90 km^{2} (9.23 sq mi)
- Elevation: 190 m (620 ft)
- Highest elevation: 218 m (715 ft)
- Lowest elevation: 128 m (420 ft)
- Population (2023): 883
  - Density: 36.9/km^{2} (95.7/sq mi)
- Time zone: UTC+01:00 (CET)
  - Summer (DST): UTC+02:00 (CEST)
- INSEE/Postal code: 16245 /16270
- ^{1} French Land Register data, which excludes lakes, ponds, glaciers > 1 km^{2} (0.386 sq mi or 247 acres) and river estuaries.

Nieuil (French pronunciation: [njœj]; Occitan: Nuelh) is a commune in the Charente department in southwestern France.

== History ==
Novioialos was a Gaulish site established next to a pagan fountain, and was Christianized under the patronage of Saint-Vivien.

In the eleventh century, the area and the Church belonged to the Viscounts of Rochechouart that created the benedictine Abbaye Saint-Pierre d'Uzerche, the forest was then cleared by the monks of the Priory of Sainte Marie-Madeleine de I'Espinassouze.

All that remains is the apse of the Church, a wall of the chapel of I' Espinassouze and the foundations of the mill.

The Châtellenie of Nieuil passed successively through the noble families Raja, Jaubert, Green Saint, - Marsault – (builders of the first castle) and Perry Fief of the barony of Champagne Mouton, it remained an enclave of Poitou until the French Revolution.

In the sixteenth century a discovery of iron ore in the forest led to the creation of a forge. The owner, Louis Lavergne Champlaurier was guillotined in 1794, with his wife Victoire.

== Nearby towns ==
Saint-Claud 3.2 km
Suaux 3.3 km
Roumazières-Loubert 6.5 km
Chasseneuil-sur-Bonnieure 7.2 km

== Transport ==
Rail

Nieuil had a railway station on the line from Ruffec to Roumazières-Loubert, which was closed in 1954. The nearest stations are in Roumazières-Loubert and Chasseneuil-sur-Bonnieure, on the line from Angoulême to Limoges.

Air

The closest airport to Nieuil is Angoulême – Brie – Champniers Airport (27 km) however it does not have scheduled flights since 2016. Slightly further afield is Limoges – Bellegarde Airport which runs scheduled flights to Lyon and the United Kingdom.

== Population ==
Historical population
Year	Pop.	±% p.a.
1968	1,021	—
1975	941	−1.16%
1982	931	−0.15%
1990	954	+0.31%
1999	907	−0.56%
2007	923	+0.22%
2012	918	−0.11%
2017	932	+0.30%
2023	883	−0.90%
Source: INSEE

== See also ==
- Communes of the Charente department
