= Lussac =

Lussac may refer to the following places in France:

- Lussac, Charente, a commune in the department of Charente
- Lussac, Charente-Maritime, a commune in the department of Charente-Maritime
- Lussac, Gironde, a commune in the department of Gironde
- Lussac-les-Châteaux, a commune in the department of Vienne
- Lussac-les-Églises, a commune in the department of Haute-Vienne
