= Saint-Coutant =

Saint-Coutant may refer to the following places in France:

- Saint-Coutant, Charente, in the Charente department
- Saint-Coutant, Deux-Sèvres, in the Deux-Sèvres department
- Saint-Coutant-le-Grand, in the Charente-Maritime department
