= Le Bouchage =

Le Bouchage is the name of 2 communes in France:

- Le Bouchage, Charente
- Le Bouchage, Isère
