= Pierre Garnier (disambiguation) =

Pierre Garnier (born 2002) is a French singer-songwriter.

Pierre Garnier may also refer to:

- Pierre Garnier de Laboissière (1754–1809), French general
- Pierre Dominique Garnier (1756–1827), French general
