= Turgon =

Turgon may refer to:

- Turgon, Charente, a commune in Nouvelle-Aquitaine, France
- Bruce Turgon, American musician
- Turgon of Gondolin, a character in J. R. R. Tolkien's Middle-earth legendarium
