= Roussines =

Roussines may refer to the following places in France:

- Roussines, Charente, a commune in the Charente department
- Roussines, Indre, a commune in the Indre department
