= Vitrac-Saint-Vincent =

- Commune
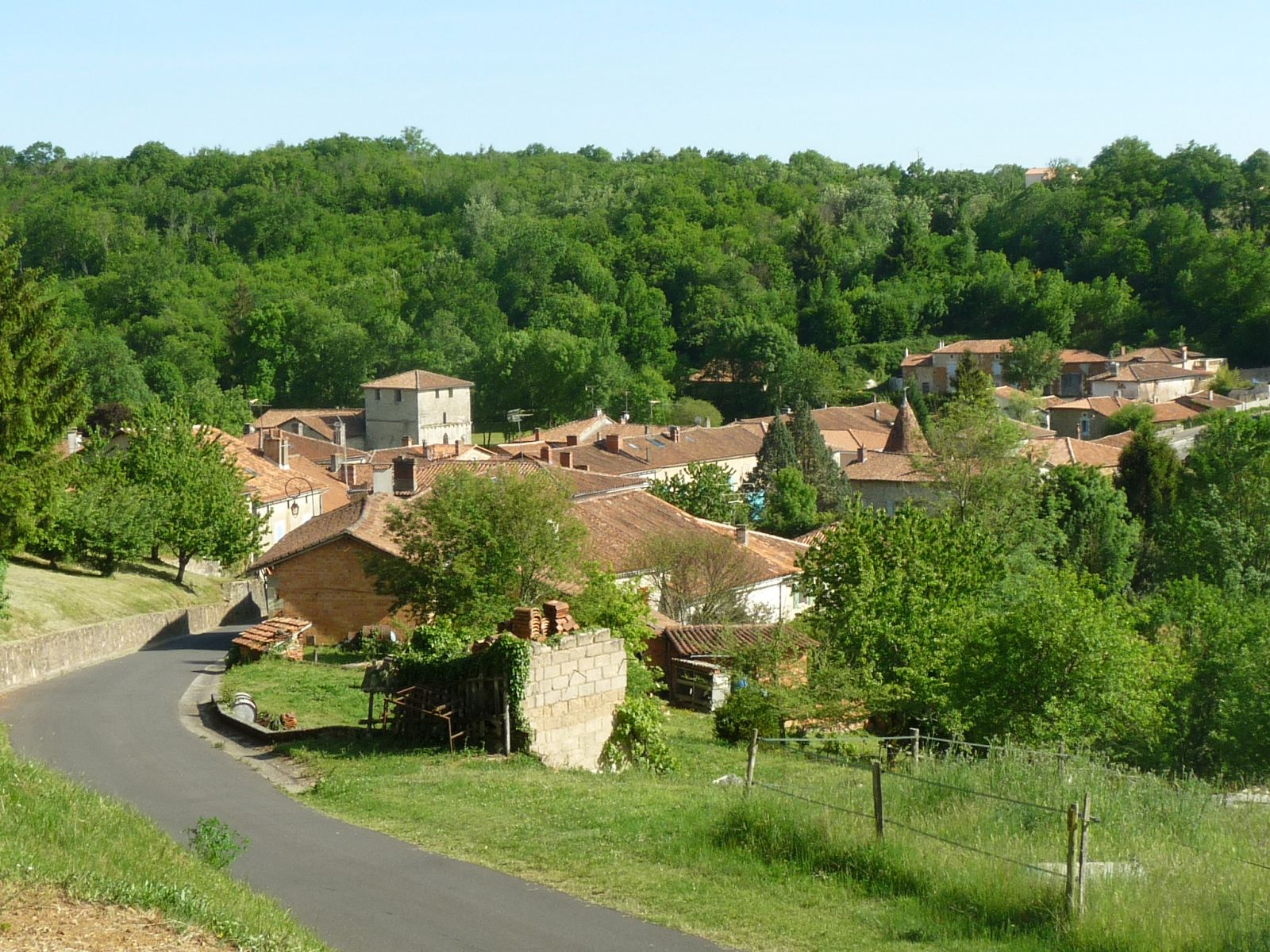
- A general view of Vitrac-Saint-Vincent
- Location of Vitrac-Saint-Vincent
- Location within France Location within Nouvelle-Aquitaine
- Coordinates: 45°47′48″N 0°29′40″E
- Country: France
- Region: Nouvelle-Aquitaine
- Department: Charente
- Arrondissement: Confolens
- Canton: Charente-Bonnieure
- Intercommunality: Charente Limousine

Government
  - Mayor (2020–2026): Pierre Soulat
- Area^{1}: 22.07 km^{2} (8.52 sq mi)
- Elevation: 136 m (446 ft)
- Highest elevation: 254 m (833 ft)
- Lowest elevation: 116 m (381 ft)
- Population (2023): 489
  - Density: 22.2/km^{2} (57.4/sq mi)
- Time zone: UTC+01:00 (CET)
  - Summer (DST): UTC+02:00 (CEST)
- INSEE/Postal code: 16416 /16310
- ^{1} French Land Register data, which excludes lakes, ponds, glaciers > 1 km^{2} (0.386 sq mi or 247 acres) and river estuaries.

Vitrac-Saint-Vincent (French pronunciation: [vitʁak sɛ̃ vɛ̃sɑ̃]) is a commune in the Charente department in southwestern France.

== Population ==
Historical population
Year	Pop.	±% p.a.
1968	545	—
1975	534	−0.29%
1982	514	−0.54%
1990	513	−0.02%
1999	512	−0.02%
2007	530	+0.43%
2012	521	−0.34%
2017	521	+0.00%
2023	489	−1.05%
Source: INSEE

== See also ==
- Communes of the Charente department
