= Le Grand-Madieu =

- Commune
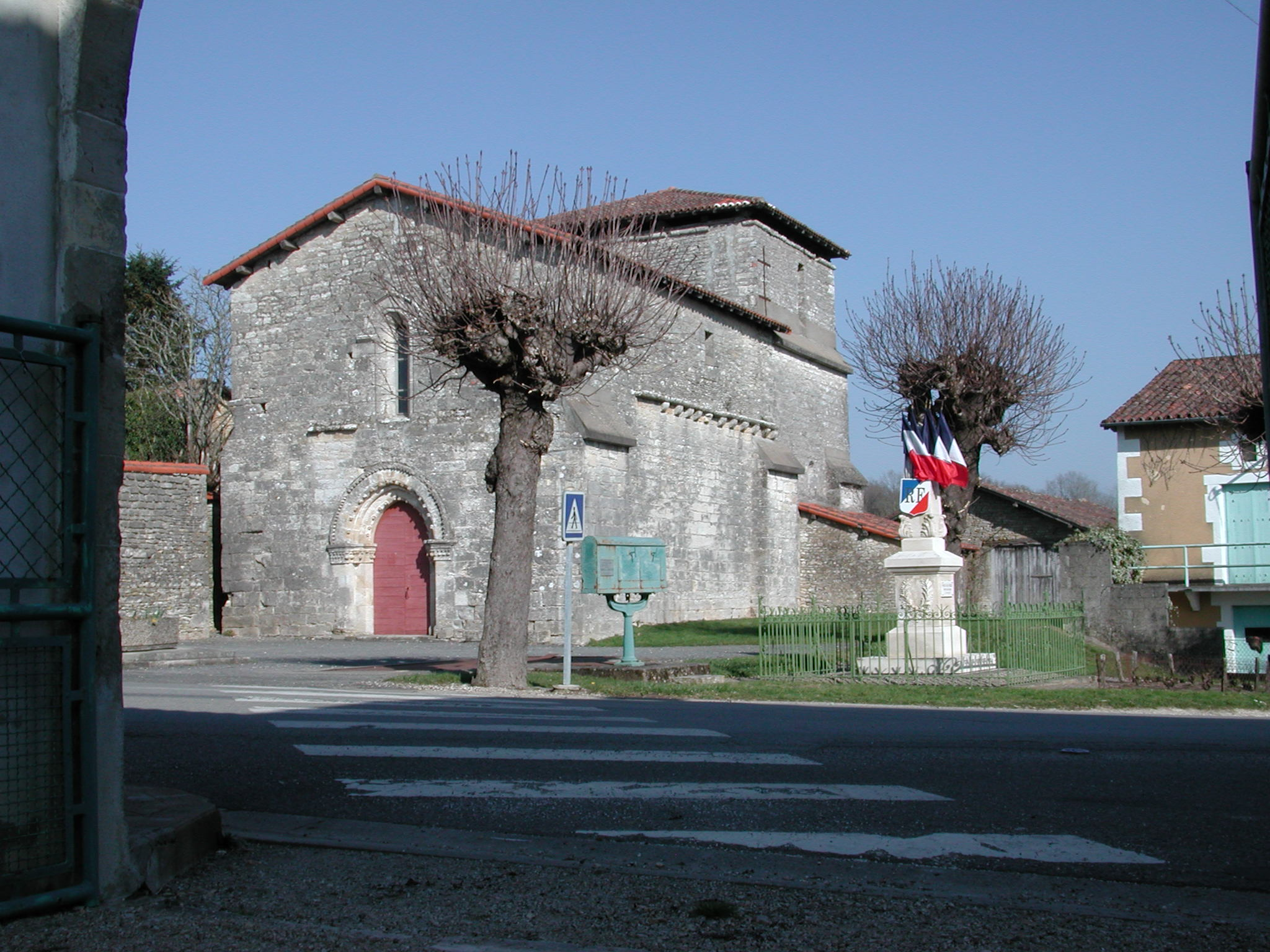
- The church in Le Grand-Madieu
- Location of Le Grand-Madieu
- Location within France Location within Nouvelle-Aquitaine
- Coordinates: 45°56′27″N 0°26′44″E
- Country: France
- Region: Nouvelle-Aquitaine
- Department: Charente
- Arrondissement: Confolens
- Canton: Charente-Bonnieure

Government
  - Mayor (2020–2026): Jean-Claude Mesnier
- Area^{1}: 8.4 km^{2} (3.2 sq mi)
- Elevation: 169 m (554 ft)
- Highest elevation: 191 m (627 ft)
- Lowest elevation: 124 m (407 ft)
- Population (2023): 153
  - Density: 18/km^{2} (47/sq mi)
- Time zone: UTC+01:00 (CET)
  - Summer (DST): UTC+02:00 (CEST)
- INSEE/Postal code: 16157 /16450
- ^{1} French Land Register data, which excludes lakes, ponds, glaciers > 1 km^{2} (0.386 sq mi or 247 acres) and river estuaries.

Le Grand-Madieu (French pronunciation: [lə ɡʁɑ̃ madjø]; Occitan: Lo Grand Mas Diu) is a commune in the Charente department in southwestern France.

== Population ==
Historical population
Year	Pop.	±% p.a.
1968	205	—
1975	208	+0.21%
1982	188	−1.43%
1990	170	−1.25%
1999	149	−1.45%
2007	174	+1.96%
2012	150	−2.92%
2017	173	+2.89%
2023	153	−2.03%
Source: INSEE

== See also ==
- Communes of the Charente department
