= Lésignac-Durand =

- Commune
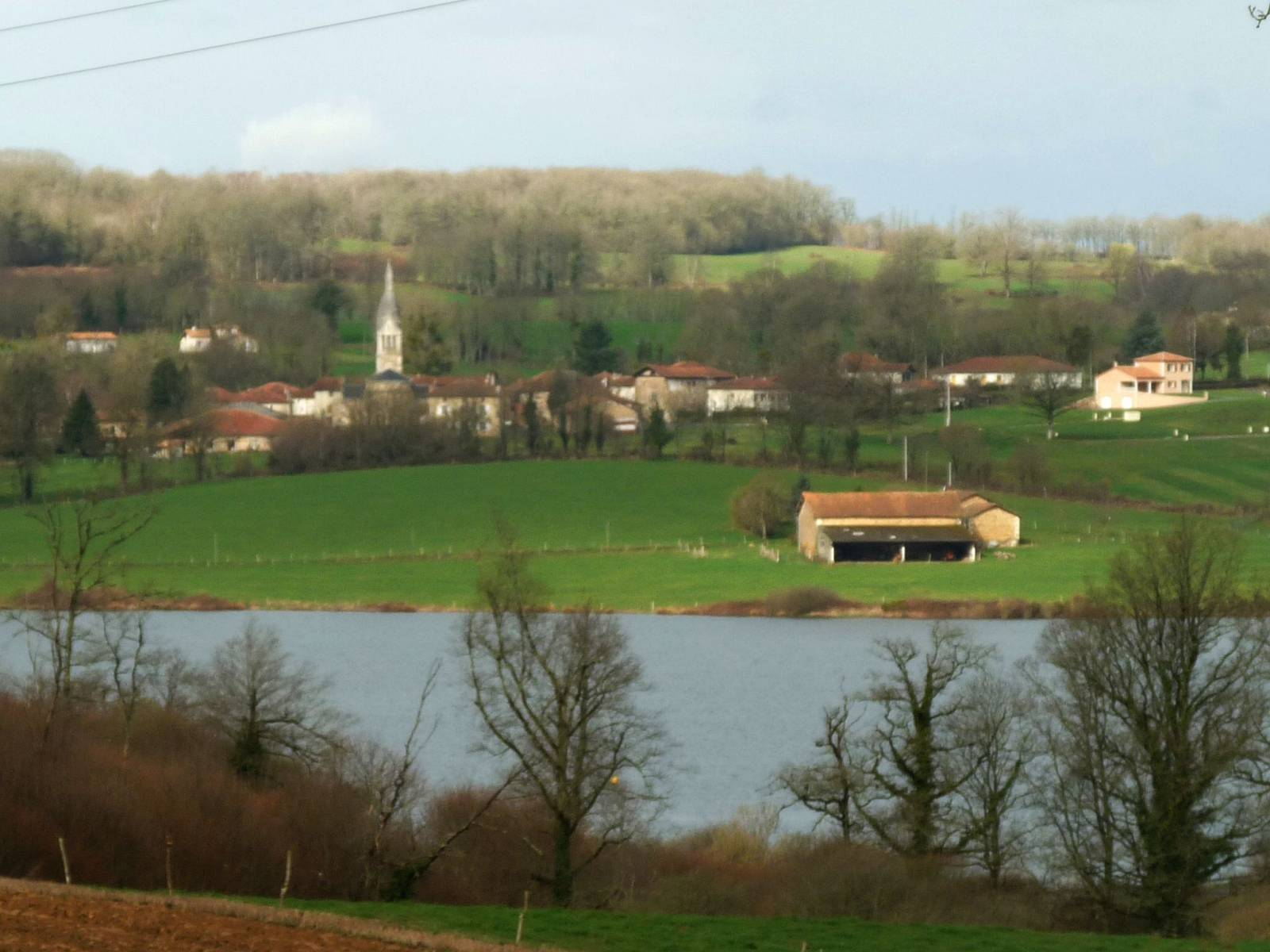
- The lake in Lésignac
- Location of Lésignac-Durand
- Location within France Location within Nouvelle-Aquitaine
- Coordinates: 45°48′44″N 0°38′17″E
- Country: France
- Region: Nouvelle-Aquitaine
- Department: Charente
- Arrondissement: Confolens
- Canton: Charente-Bonnieure

Government
  - Mayor (2020–2026): Pascal Duteil
- Area^{1}: 19.74 km^{2} (7.62 sq mi)
- Elevation: 245 m (804 ft)
- Highest elevation: 296 m (971 ft)
- Lowest elevation: 193 m (633 ft)
- Population (2023): 167
  - Density: 8.46/km^{2} (21.9/sq mi)
- Time zone: UTC+01:00 (CET)
  - Summer (DST): UTC+02:00 (CEST)
- INSEE/Postal code: 16183 /16310
- ^{1} French Land Register data, which excludes lakes, ponds, glaciers > 1 km^{2} (0.386 sq mi or 247 acres) and river estuaries.

Lésignac-Durand (French pronunciation: [leziɲak dyʁɑ̃]; Occitan: Lesinhac) is a commune in the Charente department in the Nouvelle-Aquitaine region in southwestern France.

== Geography ==
The commune is found within the Rochechouart impact structure.

== Population ==
Historical population
Year	Pop.	±% p.a.
1968	399	—
1975	352	−1.77%
1982	299	−2.30%
1990	228	−3.33%
1999	184	−2.35%
2007	194	+0.66%
2012	181	−1.38%
2017	187	+0.65%
2023	167	−1.87%
Source: INSEE

== Personalities ==
- Antoine Thomas, Sieur de Lézignac, adviser to the king holding the Présidial seat of Angoumois.
- The Thomas family members were aldermen, mayors of Angoulême, and advisers to the Présidial of Angoulême in the seventeenth century. The family was ennobled in 1639, 1667 and 1736.

== See also ==
- Communes of the Charente department
