= Montembœuf =

- Commune
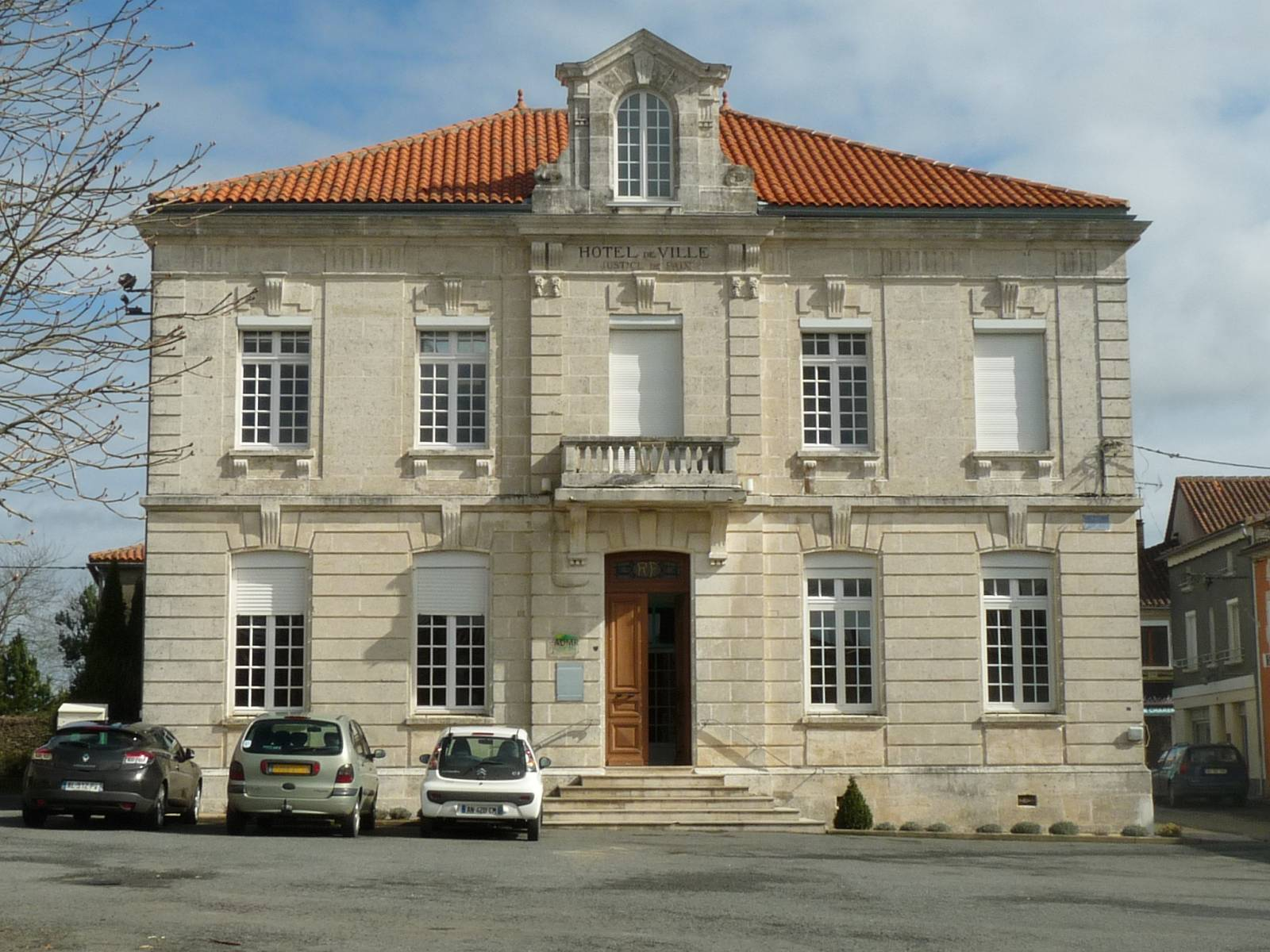
- Town hall

- Coat of arms
- Location of Montembœuf
- Location within France Location within Nouvelle-Aquitaine
- Coordinates: 45°46′44″N 0°33′12″E
- Country: France
- Region: Nouvelle-Aquitaine
- Department: Charente
- Arrondissement: Confolens
- Canton: Charente-Bonnieure
- Intercommunality: Charente Limousine

Government
  - Mayor (2020–2026): Jean-Marie Trapateau
- Area^{1}: 16.05 km^{2} (6.20 sq mi)
- Elevation: 270 m (890 ft)
- Highest elevation: 342 m (1,122 ft)
- Lowest elevation: 181 m (594 ft)
- Population (2023): 654
  - Density: 40.7/km^{2} (106/sq mi)
- Time zone: UTC+01:00 (CET)
  - Summer (DST): UTC+02:00 (CEST)
- INSEE/Postal code: 16225 /16310
- ^{1} French Land Register data, which excludes lakes, ponds, glaciers > 1 km^{2} (0.386 sq mi or 247 acres) and river estuaries.

Montembœuf (French pronunciation: [mɔ̃tɑ̃bœf]; Occitan: Montembuòu) is a commune in the Charente department in southwestern France.

== Population ==
Historical population
Year	Pop.	±% p.a.
1968	756	—
1975	676	−1.59%
1982	701	+0.52%
1990	708	+0.12%
1999	669	−0.63%
2007	693	+0.44%
2012	679	−0.41%
2017	653	−0.78%
2023	654	+0.03%
Source: INSEE

== Climate ==
Climate data for Montembœuf (1991–2020 averages)
Month	Jan	Feb	Mar	Apr	May	Jun	Jul	Aug	Sep	Oct	Nov	Dec	Year
Record high °C (°F)	17.6 (63.7)	23.8 (74.8)	26.1 (79.0)	30.0 (86.0)	32.7 (90.9)	37.8 (100.0)	38.2 (100.8)	40.1 (104.2)	35.0 (95.0)	31.5 (88.7)	23.4 (74.1)	17.7 (63.9)	40.1 (104.2)
Mean daily maximum °C (°F)	8.2 (46.8)	9.4 (48.9)	13.2 (55.8)	16.0 (60.8)	19.7 (67.5)	23.3 (73.9)	25.5 (77.9)	25.8 (78.4)	22.0 (71.6)	17.3 (63.1)	11.8 (53.2)	8.9 (48.0)	16.8 (62.2)
Daily mean °C (°F)	5.6 (42.1)	6.1 (43.0)	9.2 (48.6)	11.5 (52.7)	15.0 (59.0)	18.4 (65.1)	20.3 (68.5)	20.5 (68.9)	17.2 (63.0)	13.7 (56.7)	8.9 (48.0)	6.3 (43.3)	12.7 (54.9)
Mean daily minimum °C (°F)	3.0 (37.4)	2.9 (37.2)	5.1 (41.2)	7.1 (44.8)	10.4 (50.7)	13.5 (56.3)	15.1 (59.2)	15.2 (59.4)	12.5 (54.5)	10.1 (50.2)	6.0 (42.8)	3.6 (38.5)	8.7 (47.7)
Record low °C (°F)	−10.0 (14.0)	−12.9 (8.8)	−10.1 (13.8)	−2.5 (27.5)	0.6 (33.1)	5.8 (42.4)	7.4 (45.3)	7.4 (45.3)	3.3 (37.9)	−2.8 (27.0)	−7.0 (19.4)	−9.9 (14.2)	−12.9 (8.8)
Average precipitation mm (inches)	93.7 (3.69)	75.6 (2.98)	71.0 (2.80)	75.8 (2.98)	85.8 (3.38)	76.7 (3.02)	60.1 (2.37)	68.4 (2.69)	73.0 (2.87)	85.8 (3.38)	100.2 (3.94)	106.3 (4.19)	972.4 (38.28)
Average precipitation days (≥ 1.0 mm)	12.8	10.6	11.0	11.0	10.9	9.1	7.7	7.6	9.1	11.9	12.9	12.8	127.5
Mean monthly sunshine hours	78.2	116.9	161.6	192.1	216.2	240.8	257.5	229.5	209.0	142.1	95.7	86.8	2,026.1
Source: Meteociel

== See also ==
- Communes of the Charente department
