= Arrondissement of Confolens =

Coordinates: 46.02°N 0.67°E

Confolens
- Arrondissement
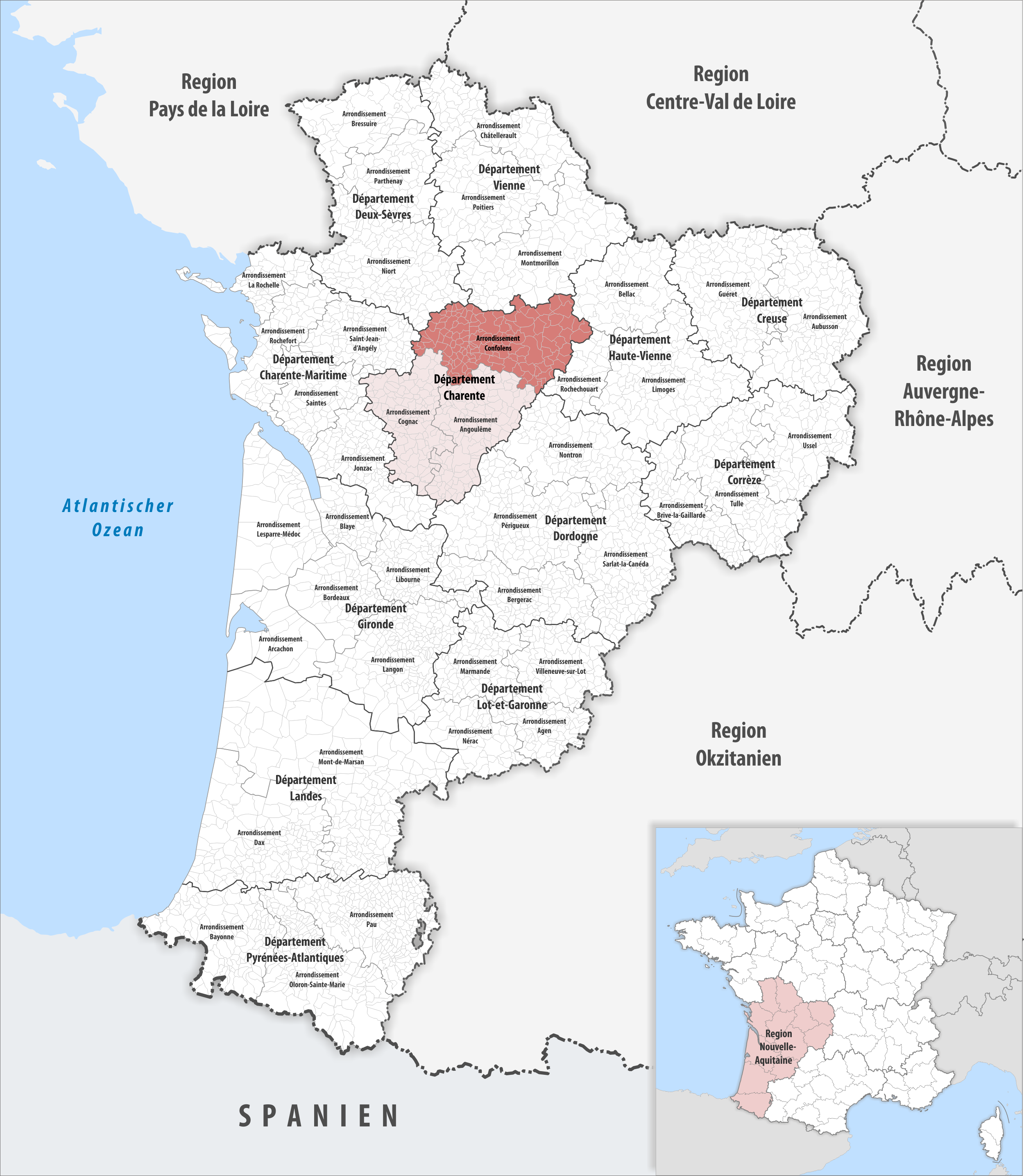
- Location within the region Nouvelle-Aquitaine
- Country: France
- Region: Nouvelle-Aquitaine
- Department: Charente
- No. of communes: {{{nbcomm}}}
- Area: 2,417.6 km^{2} (933.4 sq mi)
- Population (2023): 71,153
  - Density: 29.431/km^{2} (76.227/sq mi)
- INSEE code: 163

The arrondissement of Confolens is an arrondissement of France in the Charente department in the Nouvelle-Aquitaine region. It has 138 communes. Its population is 70,869 (2021), and its area is 2,417.6 km^{2} (933.4 sq mi).

== Composition ==
The communes of the arrondissement of Confolens, and their INSEE codes, are:

1. Abzac (16001)
2. Les Adjots (16002)
3. Aigre (16005)
4. Alloue (16007)
5. Ambérac (16008)
6. Ambernac (16009)
7. Anais (16011)
8. Ansac-sur-Vienne (16016)
9. Aunac-sur-Charente (16023)
10. Aussac-Vadalle (16024)
11. Barbezières (16027)
12. Barro (16031)
13. Beaulieu-sur-Sonnette (16035)
14. Benest (16038)
15. Bernac (16039)
16. Bessé (16042)
17. Bioussac (16044)
18. La Boixe (16393)
19. Le Bouchage (16054)
20. Brettes (16059)
21. Brigueuil (16064)
22. Brillac (16065)
23. Cellefrouin (16068)
24. Cellettes (16069)
25. Chabanais (16070)
26. Chabrac (16071)
27. Champagne-Mouton (16076)
28. La Chapelle (16081)
29. Charmé (16083)
30. Chasseneuil-sur-Bonnieure (16085)
31. Chassenon (16086)
32. Chassiecq (16087)
33. Chenon (16095)
34. Cherves-Châtelars (16096)
35. La Chèvrerie (16098)
36. Chirac (16100)
37. Condac (16104)
38. Confolens (16106)
39. Coulonges (16108)
40. Courcôme (16110)
41. Couture (16114)
42. Ébréon (16122)
43. Empuré (16127)
44. Épenède (16128)
45. Esse (16131)
46. Étagnac (16132)
47. Exideuil-sur-Vienne (16134)
48. La Faye (16136)
49. Fontenille (16141)
50. La Forêt-de-Tessé (16142)
51. Fouqueure (16144)
52. Les Gours (16155)
53. Le Grand-Madieu (16157)
54. Hiesse (16164)
55. Juillé (16173)
56. Lésignac-Durand (16183)
57. Lessac (16181)
58. Lesterps (16182)
59. Lichères (16184)
60. Ligné (16185)
61. Le Lindois (16188)
62. Londigny (16189)
63. Longré (16190)
64. Lonnes (16191)
65. Lupsault (16194)
66. Lussac (16195)
67. Luxé (16196)
68. La Magdeleine (16197)
69. Maine-de-Boixe (16200)
70. Manot (16205)
71. Mansle-les-Fontaines (16206)
72. Massignac (16212)
73. Mazerolles (16213)
74. Montembœuf (16225)
75. Montjean (16229)
76. Montrollet (16231)
77. Mouton (16237)
78. Mouzon (16239)
79. Nanclars (16241)
80. Nanteuil-en-Vallée (16242)
81. Nieuil (16245)
82. Oradour (16248)
83. Oradour-Fanais (16249)
84. Paizay-Naudouin-Embourie (16253)
85. Parzac (16255)
86. Les Pins (16261)
87. Pleuville (16264)
88. Poursac (16268)
89. Pressignac (16270)
90. Puyréaux (16272)
91. Raix (16273)
92. Ranville-Breuillaud (16275)
93. Roussines (16289)
94. Ruffec (16292)
95. Saint-Amant-de-Boixe (16295)
96. Saint-Christophe (16306)
97. Saint-Ciers-sur-Bonnieure (16307)
98. Saint-Claud (16308)
99. Saint-Coutant (16310)
100. Saint-Fraigne (16317)
101. Saint-Front (16318)
102. Saint-Georges (16321)
103. Saint-Gourson (16325)
104. Saint-Groux (16326)
105. Saint-Laurent-de-Céris (16329)
106. Saint-Martin-du-Clocher (16335)
107. Saint-Mary (16336)
108. Saint-Maurice-des-Lions (16337)
109. Saint-Quentin-sur-Charente (16345)
110. Saint-Sulpice-de-Ruffec (16356)
111. Salles-de-Villefagnan (16361)
112. Saulgond (16363)
113. Sauvagnac (16364)
114. Souvigné (16373)
115. Suaux (16375)
116. La Tâche (16377)
117. Taizé-Aizie (16378)
118. Terres-de-Haute-Charente (16192)
119. Theil-Rabier (16381)
120. Tourriers (16383)
121. Turgon (16389)
122. Tusson (16390)
123. Val-de-Bonnieure (16300)
124. Valence (16392)
125. Ventouse (16396)
126. Verdille (16397)
127. Verneuil (16398)
128. Verteuil-sur-Charente (16400)
129. Vervant (16401)
130. Le Vieux-Cérier (16403)
131. Vieux-Ruffec (16404)
132. Villefagnan (16409)
133. Villejoubert (16412)
134. Villiers-le-Roux (16413)
135. Villognon (16414)
136. Vitrac-Saint-Vincent (16416)
137. Vouharte (16419)
138. Xambes (16423)

== History ==
The arrondissement of Confolens was created in 1800. On 1 January 2008 the four cantons of Aigre, Mansle, Ruffec and Villefagnan that previously belonged to the arrondissement of Angoulême were added to the arrondissement of Confolens. At the January 2017 reorganisation of the arrondissements of Charente, it gained 15 communes from the arrondissement of Angoulême.

As a result of the reorganisation of the cantons of France which came into effect in 2015, the borders of the cantons are no longer related to the borders of the arrondissements. The cantons of the arrondissement of Confolens were, as of January 2015:

1. Aigre
2. Chabanais
3. Champagne-Mouton
4. Confolens-Nord
5. Confolens-Sud
6. Mansle
7. Montemboeuf
8. Ruffec
9. Saint-Claud
10. Villefagnan
