= Parzac =

- Commune
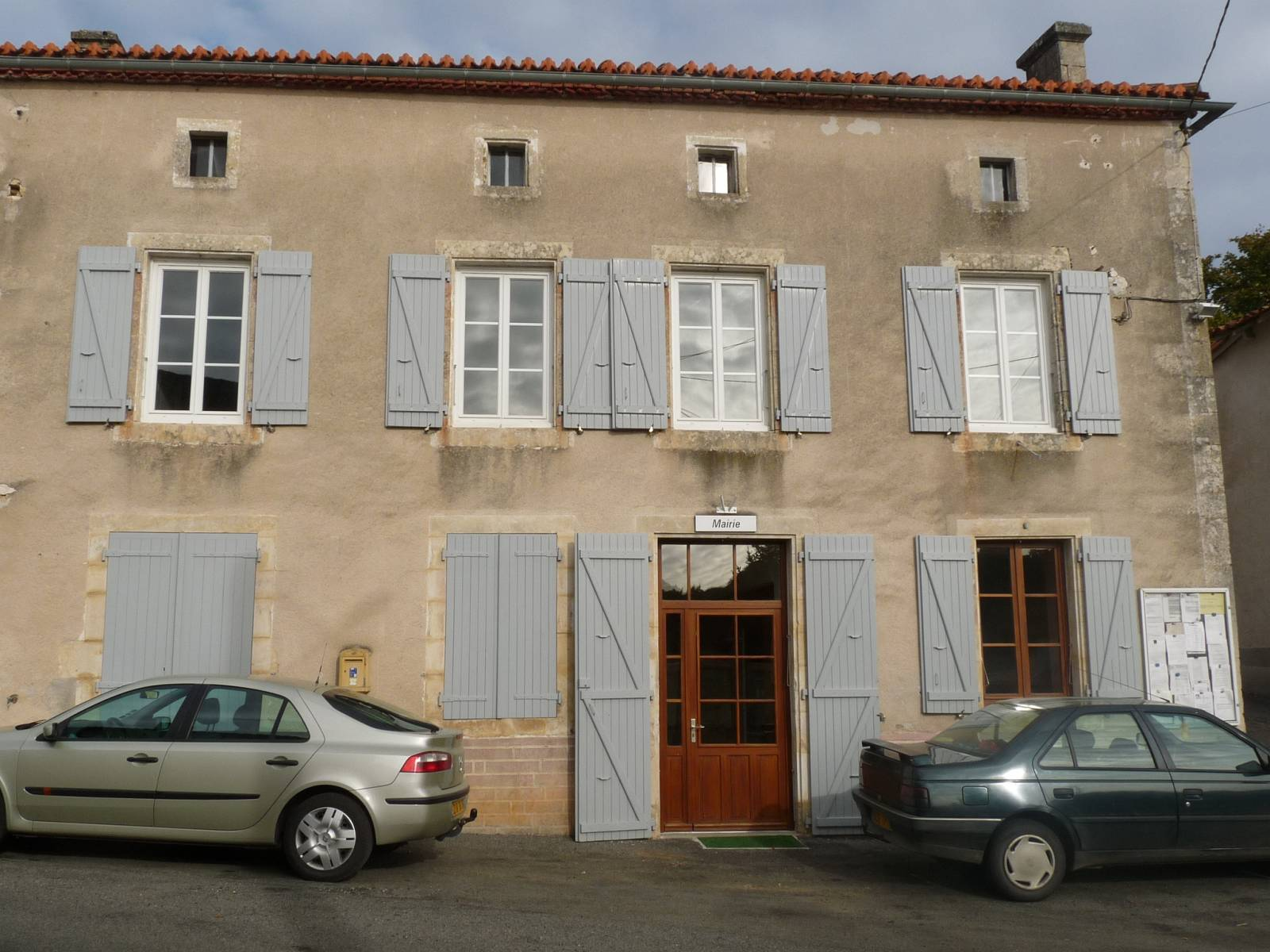
- Town hall
- Location of Parzac
- Location within France Location within Nouvelle-Aquitaine
- Coordinates: 45°56′02″N 0°25′02″E
- Country: France
- Region: Nouvelle-Aquitaine
- Department: Charente
- Arrondissement: Confolens
- Canton: Charente-Bonnieure
- Intercommunality: Charente Limousine

Government
  - Mayor (2020–2026): Pierre Madier
- Area^{1}: 11.38 km^{2} (4.39 sq mi)
- Elevation: 100 m (330 ft)
- Highest elevation: 182 m (597 ft)
- Lowest elevation: 105 m (344 ft)
- Population (2023): 143
  - Density: 12.6/km^{2} (32.5/sq mi)
- Time zone: UTC+01:00 (CET)
  - Summer (DST): UTC+02:00 (CEST)
- INSEE/Postal code: 16255 /16450
- ^{1} French Land Register data, which excludes lakes, ponds, glaciers > 1 km^{2} (0.386 sq mi or 247 acres) and river estuaries.

Parzac (French pronunciation: [paʁzak]) is a commune in the Charente department in southwestern France.

== Population ==
Historical population
Year	Pop.	±% p.a.
1968	234	—
1975	178	−3.83%
1982	163	−1.25%
1990	136	−2.24%
1999	127	−0.76%
2007	132	+0.48%
2012	136	+0.60%
2017	140	+0.58%
2023	143	+0.35%
Source: INSEE

== See also ==
- Communes of the Charente department
