= Pierre Garnier de Laboissière =

French soldier, politician and officer

- Born: 11 March 1755; Chassiecq, France
- Died: 14 April 1809 (aged 54) Paris, France
- Allegiance: Kingdom of France; France
- Branch: Cavalry, Infantry
- Service years: 1772–1809
- Rank: Général de Division
- Conflicts: War of the First Coalition; Battle of Trippstadt; Battle of Biberach; War of the Second Coalition; Battle of Stockach; Battle of Novi
- Awards: Légion d'Honneur, GC 1804; Count of the Empire, 1808

Pierre Garnier, comte de Laboissière (11 March 1755 – 14 April 1809) was a French army general who commanded an infantry division during the War of the Second Coalition. After enrolling in a military academy in 1769, he joined a dragoon regiment in 1772 as a sous lieutenant. In 1779, he was promoted to captain. In late 1792 during the War of the First Coalition he was given command of a cavalry regiment with the grade of colonel. While serving in the Army of the Rhine he was captured by the Prussians. After a prisoner exchange, he was promoted to général de brigade in October 1793. Laboissière was promoted to général de division in February 1799. He fought at Stockach and led a division at Novi. In the summer and fall of 1799 he fought in several actions near Genoa. Later he commanded troops in Switzerland. Napoleon appointed him to the Sénat conservateur in 1802, awarded him the Commander's Cross of the Légion d'Honneur in 1804 and made him a comte de l'empire in 1808. He died in Paris in April 1809. His surname is one of the names inscribed under the Arc de Triomphe, on Column 15.

== Career ==
During the Battle of Trippstadt on 12–13 July 1794, Laboissière commanded the divisional artillery of Laurent Gouvion Saint-Cyr's division. One of his officers placed his battery is a badly exposed position, and a body of Prussian cavalry led by Gebhard Leberecht von Blücher pounced on it, seizing two artillery pieces. In the melee Laboissière was also captured.

At the Battle of Biberach Laboissière led a brigade in Saint-Cyr's division. Massing a battery of 24 artillery pieces, Saint-Cyr launched his main assault on the Austrian center, while leaving Laboissière's brigade to contain the enemy left flank under Louis Joseph de Bourbon, Prince de Condé and Karl Mercandin. The attack in the center made good progress, but Laboissière sent Saint-Cyr a number of messages for help, claiming that his brigade was in the process of being overwhelmed. Finally, Saint-Cyr suspended the main attack and went to the rescue with some troops. By this time, Condé and Mercandin were starting to retreat after seeing that the Austrian center was being driven in. At the head of some cavalry, Saint-Cyr tried to cut off the enemy but Condé and Mercandin narrowly escaped across the Riss River. Saint-Cyr then returned to the center to complete the rout of Maximilian Anton Karl, Count Baillet de Latour's Austrian army.
