= Vieux-Ruffec =

- Commune
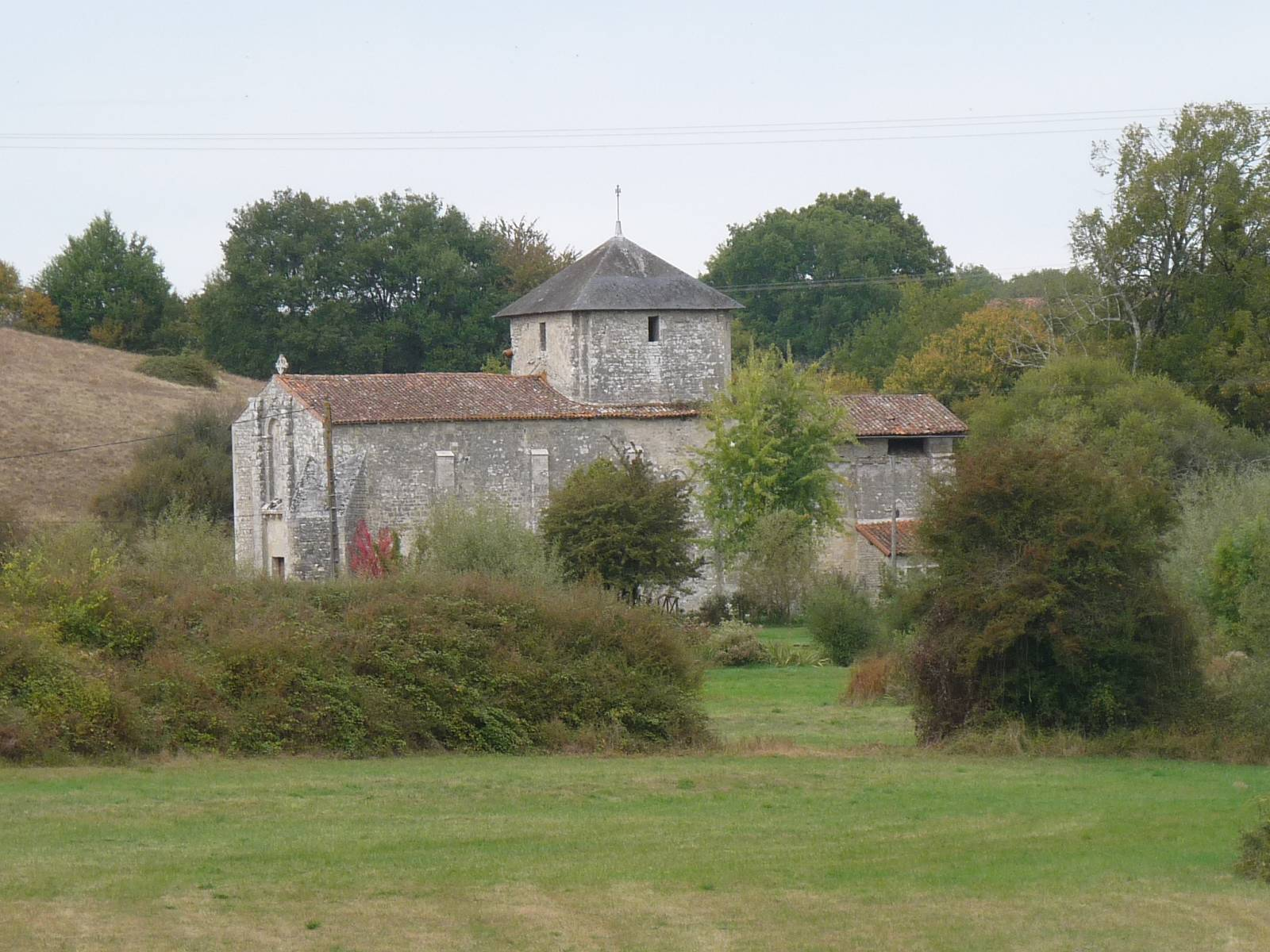
- The church in Vieux-Ruffec
- Location of Vieux-Ruffec
- Location within France Location within Nouvelle-Aquitaine
- Coordinates: 46°00′37″N 0°23′20″E
- Country: France
- Region: Nouvelle-Aquitaine
- Department: Charente
- Arrondissement: Confolens
- Canton: Charente-Bonnieure
- Intercommunality: Charente Limousine

Government
  - Mayor (2020–2026): Laurent Loubersac
- Area^{1}: 12.75 km^{2} (4.92 sq mi)
- Elevation: 125 m (410 ft)
- Highest elevation: 218 m (715 ft)
- Lowest elevation: 120 m (390 ft)
- Population (2023): 106
  - Density: 8.31/km^{2} (21.5/sq mi)
- Time zone: UTC+01:00 (CET)
  - Summer (DST): UTC+02:00 (CEST)
- INSEE/Postal code: 16404 /16350
- ^{1} French Land Register data, which excludes lakes, ponds, glaciers > 1 km^{2} (0.386 sq mi or 247 acres) and river estuaries.

Vieux-Ruffec (French pronunciation: [vjø ʁyfɛk]) is a commune in the Charente department in southwestern France.

== Population ==
Historical population
Year	Pop.	±% p.a.
1968	136	—
1975	132	−0.43%
1982	111	−2.44%
1990	85	−3.28%
1999	98	+1.59%
2007	100	+0.25%
2012	121	+3.89%
2017	106	−2.61%
2023	106	+0.00%
Source: INSEE

== See also ==
- Communes of the Charente department
