= Saint-Mary =

- Commune
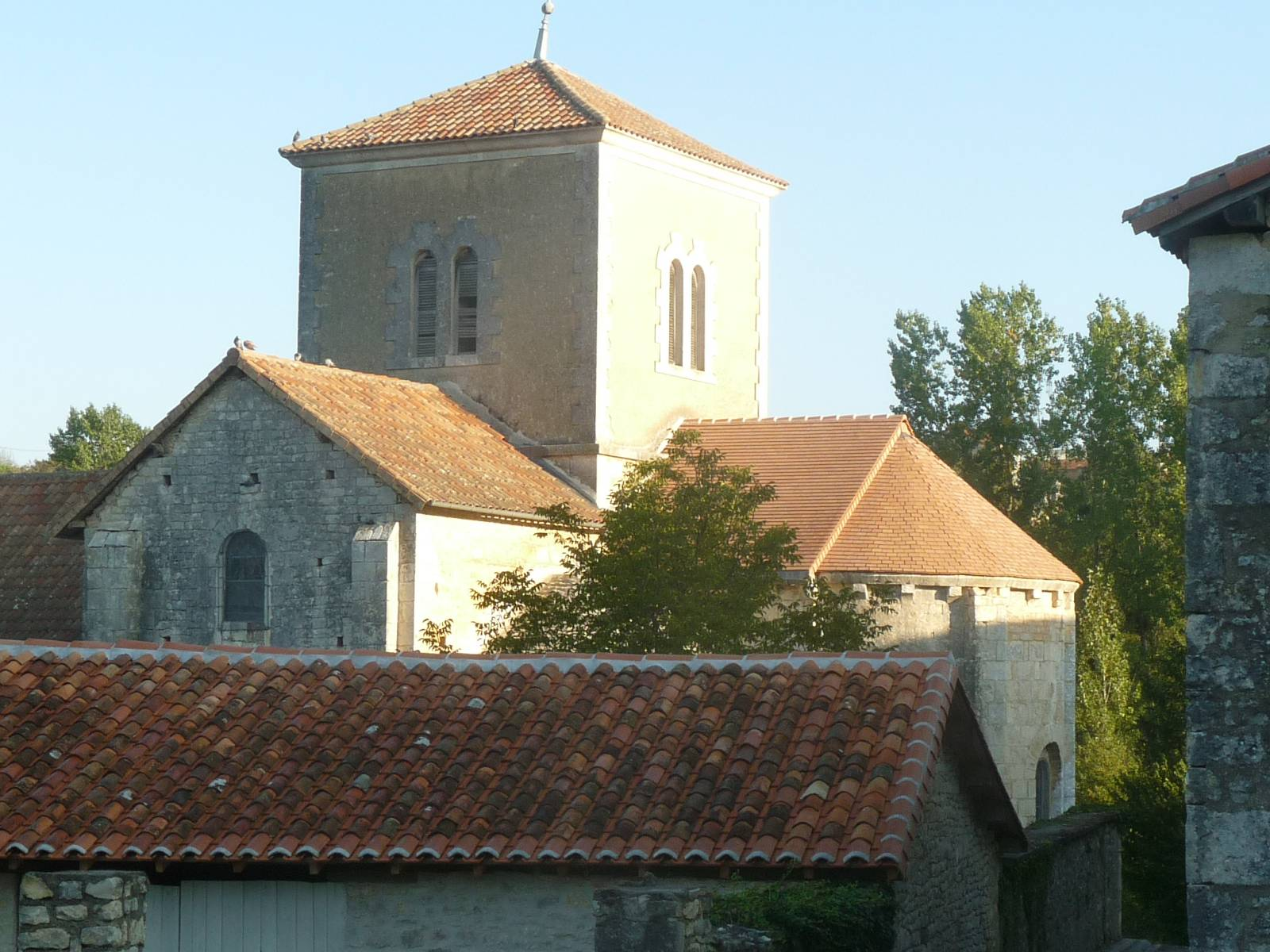
- The church in Saint-Mary
- Location of Saint-Mary
- Location within France Location within Nouvelle-Aquitaine
- Coordinates: 45°50′01″N 0°23′24″E
- Country: France
- Region: Nouvelle-Aquitaine
- Department: Charente
- Arrondissement: Confolens
- Canton: Charente-Bonnieure
- Intercommunality: Charente Limousine

Government
  - Mayor (2020–2026): Philippe Palard
- Area^{1}: 21.86 km^{2} (8.44 sq mi)
- Elevation: 190 m (620 ft)
- Highest elevation: 183 m (600 ft)
- Lowest elevation: 75 m (246 ft)
- Population (2023): 354
  - Density: 16.2/km^{2} (41.9/sq mi)
- Time zone: UTC+01:00 (CET)
  - Summer (DST): UTC+02:00 (CEST)
- INSEE/Postal code: 16336 /16260
- ^{1} French Land Register data, which excludes lakes, ponds, glaciers > 1 km^{2} (0.386 sq mi or 247 acres) and river estuaries.

Saint-Mary (French pronunciation: [sɛ̃ maʁi]) is a commune in the Charente department in southwestern France. It takes its name from Marius or Mary, a 6th century hermit in Auvergne.

== Population ==
Historical population
Year	Pop.	±% p.a.
1968	468	—
1975	371	−3.26%
1982	315	−2.31%
1990	373	+2.14%
1999	365	−0.24%
2007	367	+0.07%
2012	362	−0.27%
2017	348	−0.79%
2023	354	+0.29%
Source: INSEE

== See also ==
- Communes of the Charente department
