= Cherves-Châtelars =

- Commune
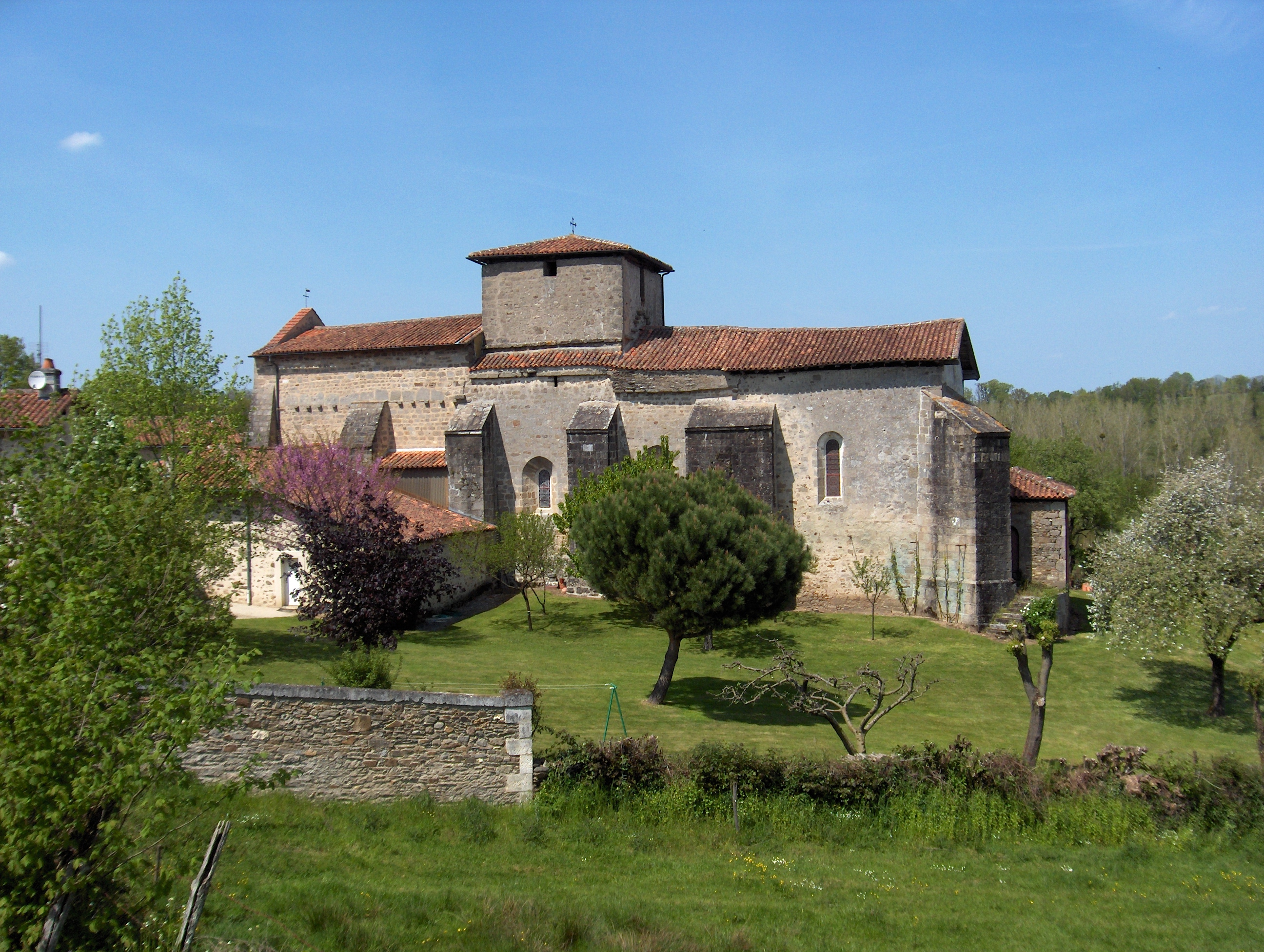
- The church in Cherves-Châtelars

- Coat of arms
- Location of Cherves-Châtelars
- Location within France Location within Nouvelle-Aquitaine
- Coordinates: 45°48′41″N 0°32′52″E
- Country: France
- Region: Nouvelle-Aquitaine
- Department: Charente
- Arrondissement: Confolens
- Canton: Charente-Bonnieure

Government
  - Mayor (2022–2026): Michel Bouyat
- Area^{1}: 30.68 km^{2} (11.85 sq mi)
- Elevation: 234 m (768 ft)
- Highest elevation: 313 m (1,027 ft)
- Lowest elevation: 125 m (410 ft)
- Population (2023): 414
  - Density: 13.5/km^{2} (34.9/sq mi)
- Time zone: UTC+01:00 (CET)
  - Summer (DST): UTC+02:00 (CEST)
- INSEE/Postal code: 16096 /16310
- ^{1} French Land Register data, which excludes lakes, ponds, glaciers > 1 km^{2} (0.386 sq mi or 247 acres) and river estuaries.

Cherves-Châtelars (French pronunciation: [ʃɛʁv ʃatlaʁ]; Occitan: Cherves Chastelar) is a commune in the Charente department in southwestern France.

== Population ==
Historical population
Year	Pop.	±% p.a.
1968	656	—
1975	608	−1.08%
1982	592	−0.38%
1990	520	−1.61%
1999	443	−1.76%
2007	433	−0.28%
2012	419	−0.66%
2017	413	−0.29%
2023	414	+0.04%
Source: INSEE

== See also ==
- Communes of the Charente department
