= Verneuil, Charente =

Verneuil
- Commune
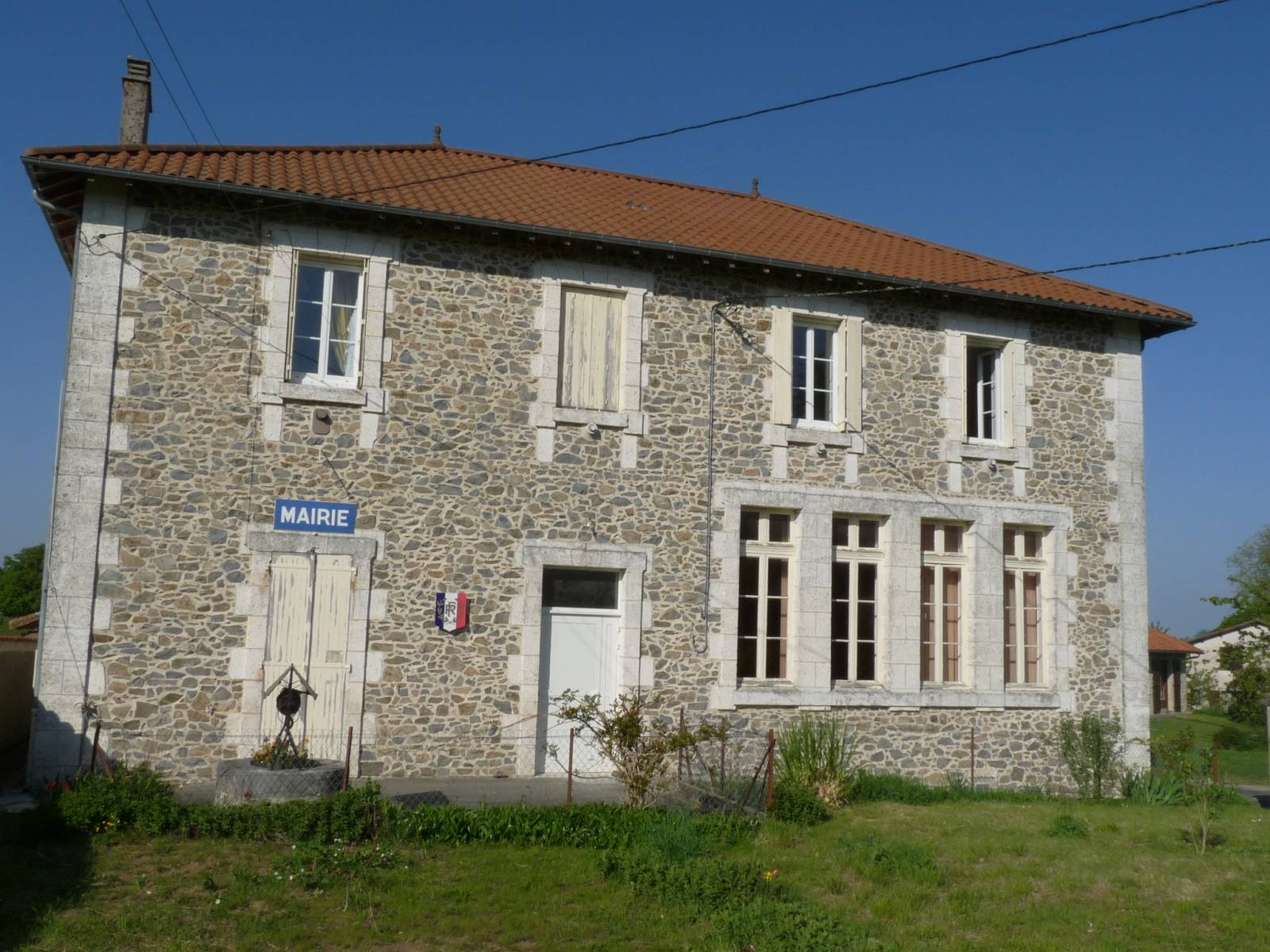
- Town hall
- Location of Verneuil
- Location within France Location within Nouvelle-Aquitaine
- Coordinates: 45°46′56″N 0°41′43″E
- Country: France
- Region: Nouvelle-Aquitaine
- Department: Charente
- Arrondissement: Confolens
- Canton: Charente-Bonnieure

Government
  - Mayor (2020–2026): Christine Gondariz
- Area^{1}: 7.70 km^{2} (2.97 sq mi)
- Elevation: 270 m (890 ft)
- Highest elevation: 298 m (978 ft)
- Lowest elevation: 217 m (712 ft)
- Population (2023): 92
  - Density: 12/km^{2} (31/sq mi)
- Time zone: UTC+01:00 (CET)
  - Summer (DST): UTC+02:00 (CEST)
- INSEE/Postal code: 16398 /16310
- ^{1} French Land Register data, which excludes lakes, ponds, glaciers > 1 km^{2} (0.386 sq mi or 247 acres) and river estuaries.

Verneuil (French pronunciation: [vɛʁnœj]) is a commune in the Charente department in southwestern France. It lies near the Lac de Lavaud, an artificial lake created by a dam in the river Charente, built in 1988.

== Population ==
Historical population
Year	Pop.	±% p.a.
1968	137	—
1975	121	−1.76%
1982	105	−2.01%
1990	102	−0.36%
1999	85	−2.01%
2007	98	+1.79%
2012	96	−0.41%
2017	98	+0.41%
2023	92	−1.05%
Source: INSEE

== See also ==
- Communes of the Charente department
