= Le Vieux-Cérier =

- Commune
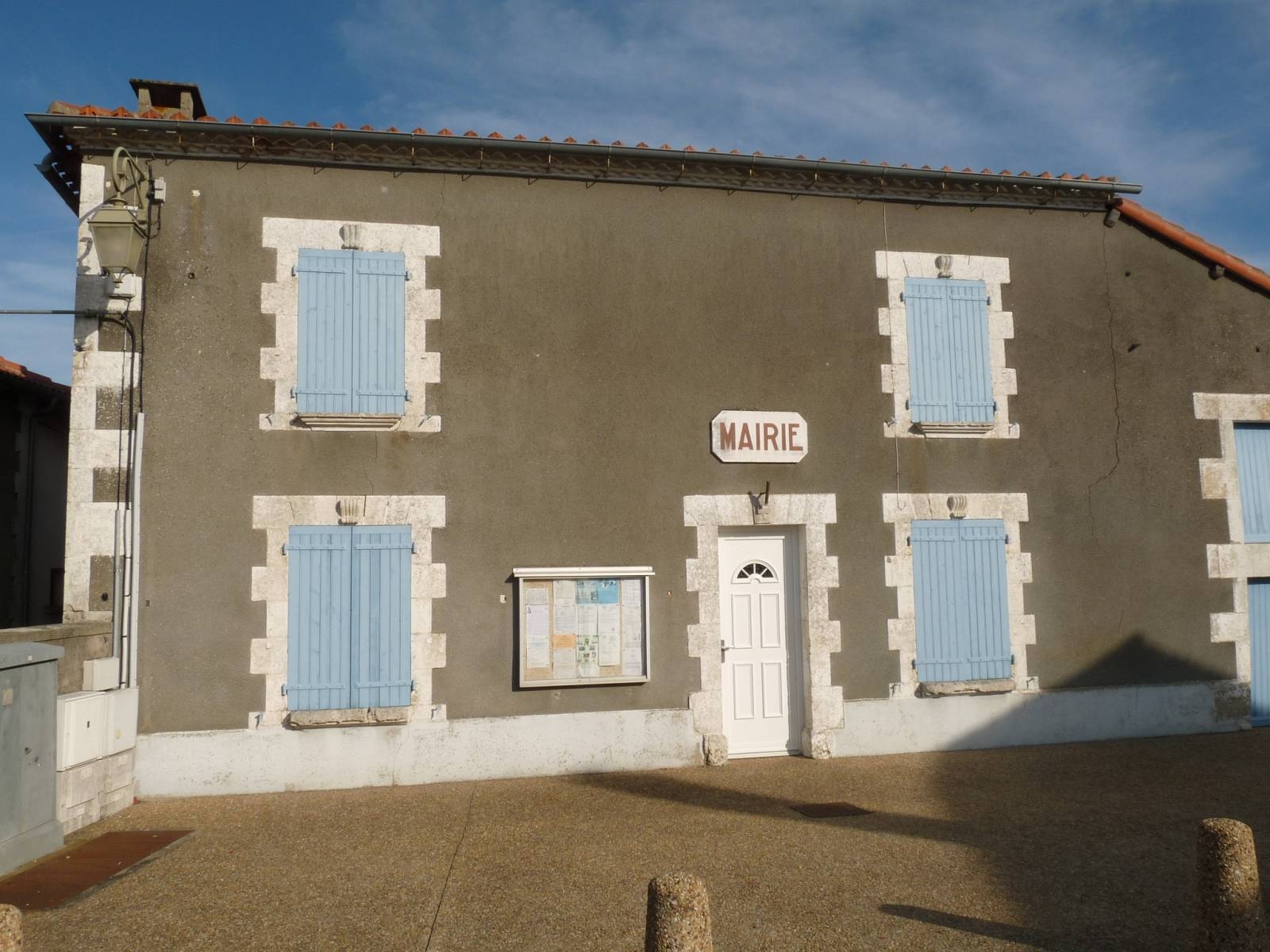
- Town hall
- Location of Le Vieux-Cérier
- Location within France Location within Nouvelle-Aquitaine
- Coordinates: 45°58′00″N 0°26′44″E
- Country: France
- Region: Nouvelle-Aquitaine
- Department: Charente
- Arrondissement: Confolens
- Canton: Charente-Bonnieure

Government
  - Mayor (2020–2026): Dominique Rolland
- Area^{1}: 9.65 km^{2} (3.73 sq mi)
- Elevation: 178 m (584 ft)
- Highest elevation: 196 m (643 ft)
- Lowest elevation: 141 m (463 ft)
- Population (2023): 129
  - Density: 13.4/km^{2} (34.6/sq mi)
- Time zone: UTC+01:00 (CET)
  - Summer (DST): UTC+02:00 (CEST)
- INSEE/Postal code: 16403 /16350
- ^{1} French Land Register data, which excludes lakes, ponds, glaciers > 1 km^{2} (0.386 sq mi or 247 acres) and river estuaries.

Le Vieux-Cérier is a commune in the Charente department in southwestern France.

== Population ==
Historical population
Year	Pop.	±% p.a.
1968	282	—
1975	243	−2.10%
1982	199	−2.81%
1990	154	−3.15%
1999	134	−1.53%
2007	142	+0.73%
2012	133	−1.30%
2017	131	−0.30%
2023	129	−0.26%
Source: INSEE

== See also ==
- Communes of the Charente department
