= Sauvagnac =

- Commune
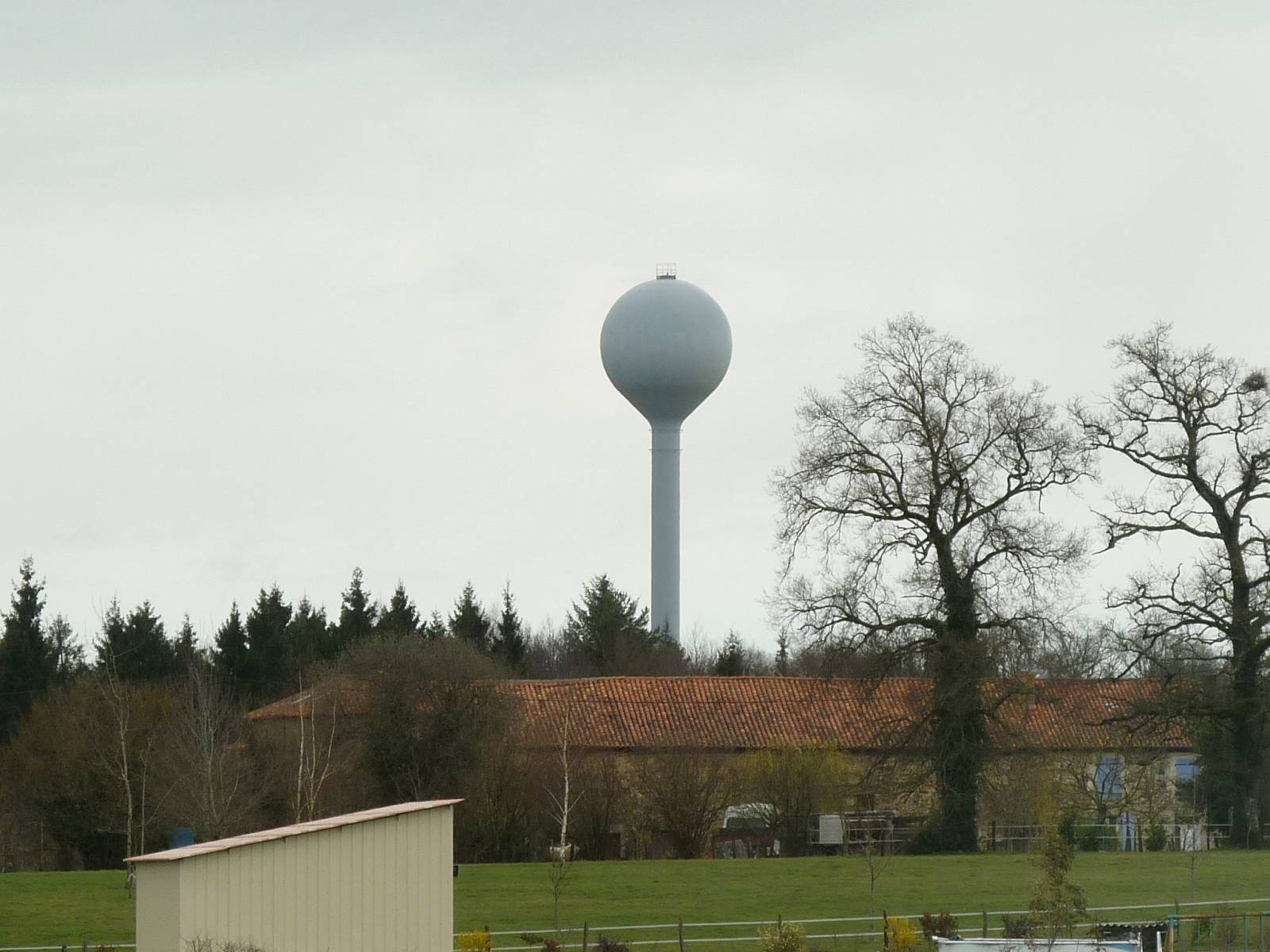
- Water tower
- Location of Sauvagnac
- Location within France Location within Nouvelle-Aquitaine
- Coordinates: 45°44′59″N 0°38′56″E
- Country: France
- Region: Nouvelle-Aquitaine
- Department: Charente
- Arrondissement: Confolens
- Canton: Charente-Bonnieure

Government
  - Mayor (2020–2026): Christelle Renaud
- Area^{1}: 7.24 km^{2} (2.80 sq mi)
- Highest elevation: 282 m (925 ft)
- Lowest elevation: 229 m (751 ft)
- Population (2023): 66
  - Density: 9.1/km^{2} (24/sq mi)
- Time zone: UTC+01:00 (CET)
  - Summer (DST): UTC+02:00 (CEST)
- INSEE/Postal code: 16364 /16310
- ^{1} French Land Register data, which excludes lakes, ponds, glaciers > 1 km^{2} (0.386 sq mi or 247 acres) and river estuaries.

Sauvagnac (French pronunciation: [sovaɲak]; Occitan: Sauvanhac) is a commune in the Charente department in southwestern France.

== Population ==
Historical population
Year	Pop.	±% p.a.
1968	93	—
1975	81	−1.95%
1982	76	−0.91%
1990	69	−1.20%
1999	64	−0.83%
2007	76	+2.17%
2012	72	−1.08%
2017	62	−2.95%
2023	66	+1.05%
Source: INSEE

== See also ==
- Communes of the Charente department
