= Canton of Charente-Bonnieure =

Coordinates: 45.82°N 0.45°E

- Canton
- Situation of the canton of Charente-Bonnieure in the department of Charente
- Country: France
- Region: Nouvelle-Aquitaine
- Department: Charente
- No. of communes: {{{nbcomm}}}
- Population (2023): 16,715
- INSEE code: 1606

The canton of Charente-Bonnieure is an administrative division of the Charente department, southwestern France. It was created at the French canton reorganisation which came into effect in March 2015. Its seat is in Chasseneuil-sur-Bonnieure.

It consists of the following communes:

1. Alloue
2. Beaulieu-sur-Sonnette
3. Benest
4. Le Bouchage
5. Champagne-Mouton
6. Chasseneuil-sur-Bonnieure
7. Chassiecq
8. Cherves-Châtelars
9. Le Grand-Madieu
10. Lésignac-Durand
11. Le Lindois
12. Lussac
13. Massignac
14. Mazerolles
15. Montembœuf
16. Mouzon
17. Nieuil
18. Parzac
19. Les Pins
20. Roussines
21. Saint-Claud
22. Saint-Coutant
23. Saint-Laurent-de-Céris
24. Saint-Mary
25. Sauvagnac
26. Suaux
27. Terres-de-Haute-Charente (partly)
28. Turgon
29. Verneuil
30. Le Vieux-Cérier
31. Vieux-Ruffec
32. Vitrac-Saint-Vincent
