= Le Lindois =

- Commune
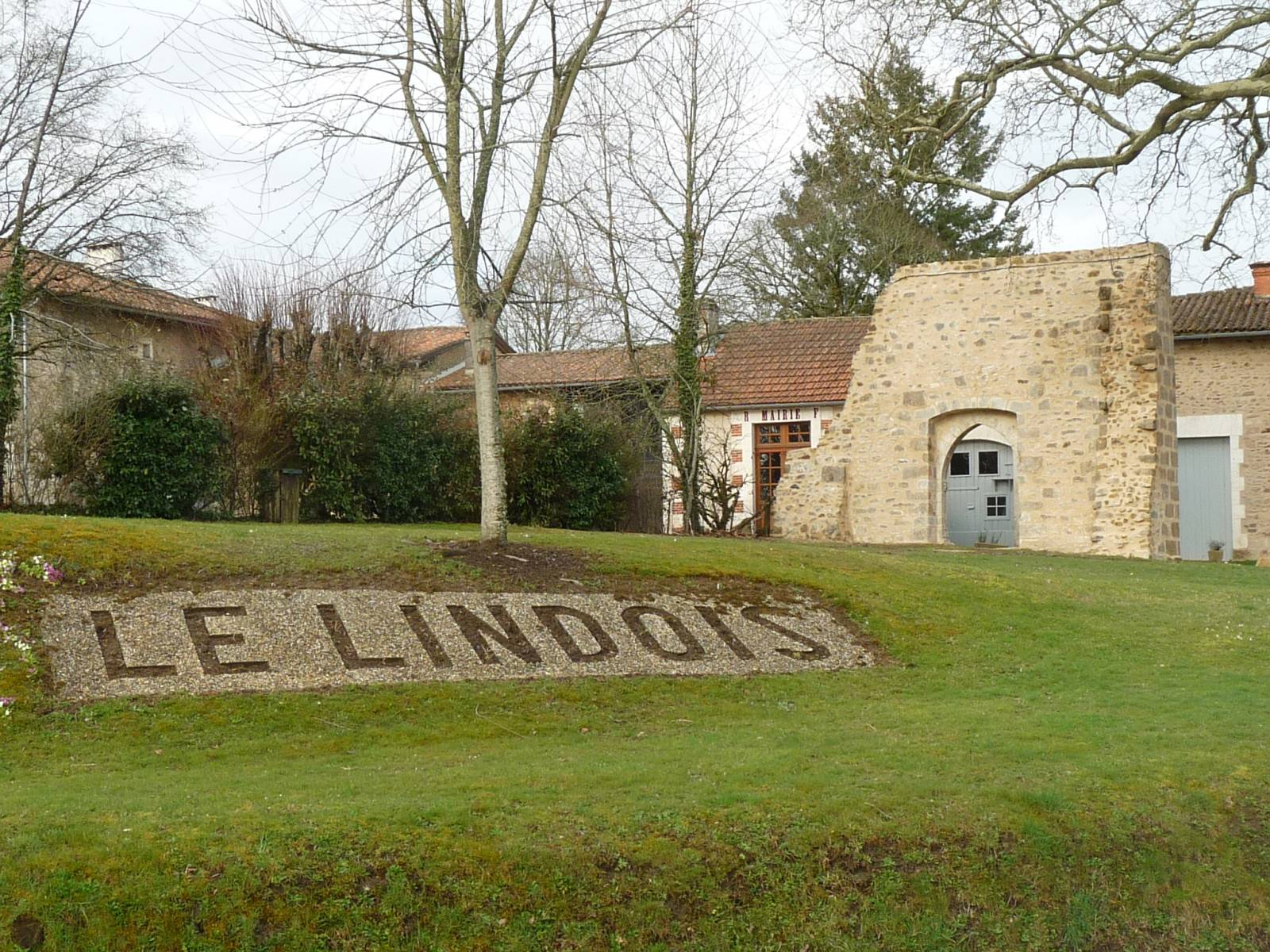
- Ruins of the old church
- Location of Le Lindois
- Location within France Location within Nouvelle-Aquitaine
- Coordinates: 45°44′48″N 0°35′32″E
- Country: France
- Region: Nouvelle-Aquitaine
- Department: Charente
- Arrondissement: Confolens
- Canton: Charente-Bonnieure

Government
  - Mayor (2020–2026): Olivier Gaillard
- Area^{1}: 17.95 km^{2} (6.93 sq mi)
- Elevation: 300 m (980 ft)
- Highest elevation: 351 m (1,152 ft)
- Lowest elevation: 224 m (735 ft)
- Population (2023): 339
  - Density: 18.9/km^{2} (48.9/sq mi)
- Time zone: UTC+01:00 (CET)
  - Summer (DST): UTC+02:00 (CEST)
- INSEE/Postal code: 16188 /16310
- ^{1} French Land Register data, which excludes lakes, ponds, glaciers > 1 km^{2} (0.386 sq mi or 247 acres) and river estuaries.

Le Lindois (French pronunciation: [lə lɛ̃dwa]) is a commune in the Charente department in southwestern France.

== Population ==
Historical population
| Year | Pop. | ±% p.a. |
|---|---|---|
| 1968 | 481 | — |
| 1975 | 388 | −3.02% |
| 1982 | 352 | −1.38% |
| 1990 | 311 | −1.54% |
| 1999 | 330 | +0.66% |
| 2007 | 322 | −0.31% |
| 2012 | 341 | +1.15% |
| 2017 | 345 | +0.23% |
| 2023 | 339 | −0.29% |
Source: INSEE

== See also ==
- Communes of the Charente department
