= Mazerolles, Charente =

Mazerolles
- Commune
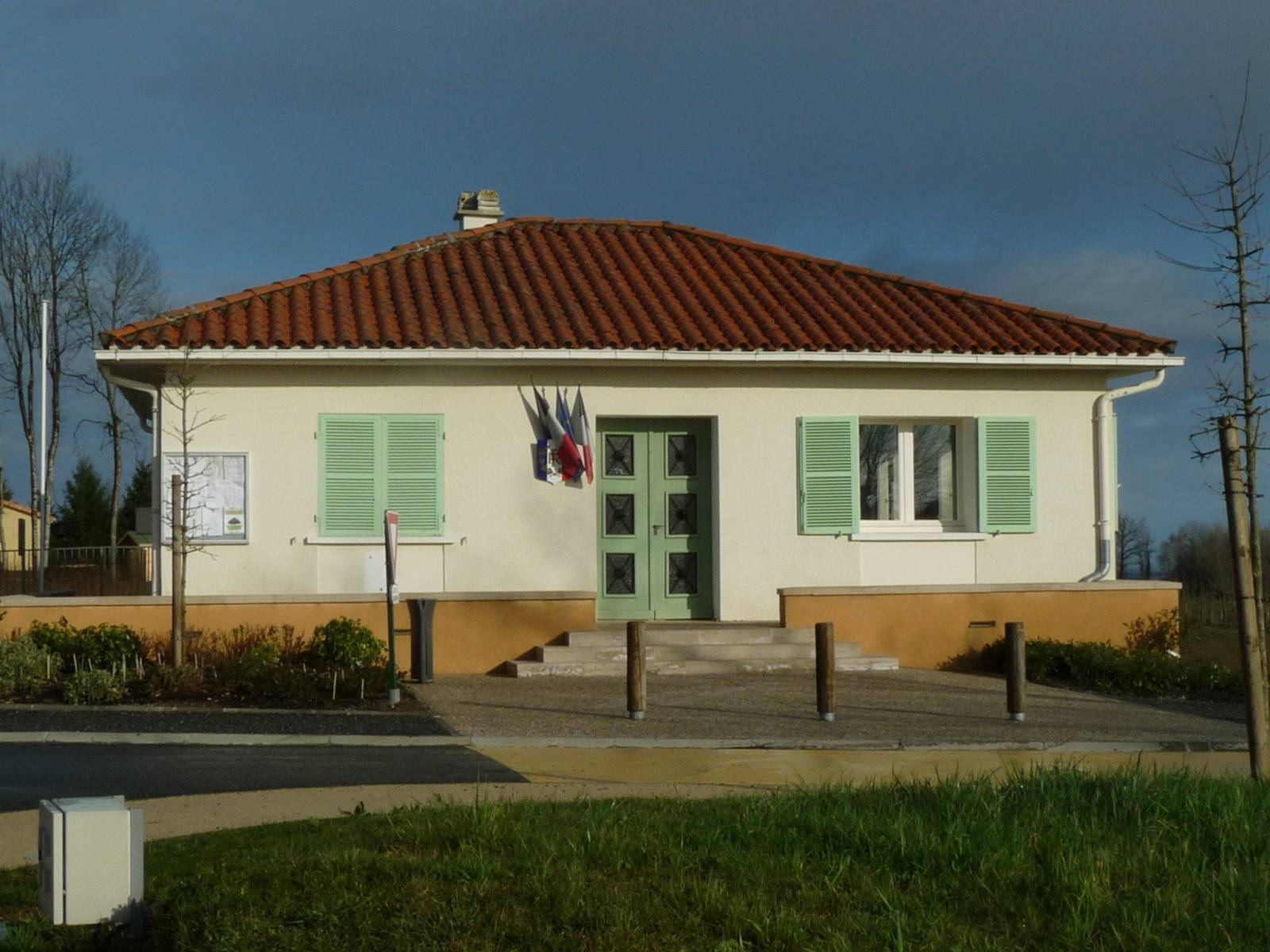
- Town hall
- Location of Mazerolles
- Location within France Location within Nouvelle-Aquitaine
- Coordinates: 45°44′54″N 0°32′05″E
- Country: France
- Region: Nouvelle-Aquitaine
- Department: Charente
- Arrondissement: Confolens
- Canton: Charente-Bonnieure
- Intercommunality: Charente Limousine

Government
  - Mayor (2020–2026): Jean-Christophe Naudon
- Area^{1}: 17.45 km^{2} (6.74 sq mi)
- Elevation: 345 m (1,132 ft)
- Highest elevation: 353 m (1,158 ft)
- Lowest elevation: 207 m (679 ft)
- Population (2023): 314
  - Density: 18.0/km^{2} (46.6/sq mi)
- Time zone: UTC+01:00 (CET)
  - Summer (DST): UTC+02:00 (CEST)
- INSEE/Postal code: 16213 /16310
- ^{1} French Land Register data, which excludes lakes, ponds, glaciers > 1 km^{2} (0.386 sq mi or 247 acres) and river estuaries.

Mazerolles (French pronunciation: [mazʁɔl]; Occitan: Maseròlas) is a commune in the Charente department in southwestern France.

== Population ==
Historical population
Year	Pop.	±% p.a.
1968	404	—
1975	331	−2.81%
1982	309	−0.98%
1990	309	+0.00%
1999	311	+0.07%
2007	326	+0.59%
2012	343	+1.02%
2017	305	−2.32%
2023	314	+0.49%
Source: INSEE

== See also ==
- Communes of the Charente department
