= Mouzon, Charente =

Mouzon
- Commune
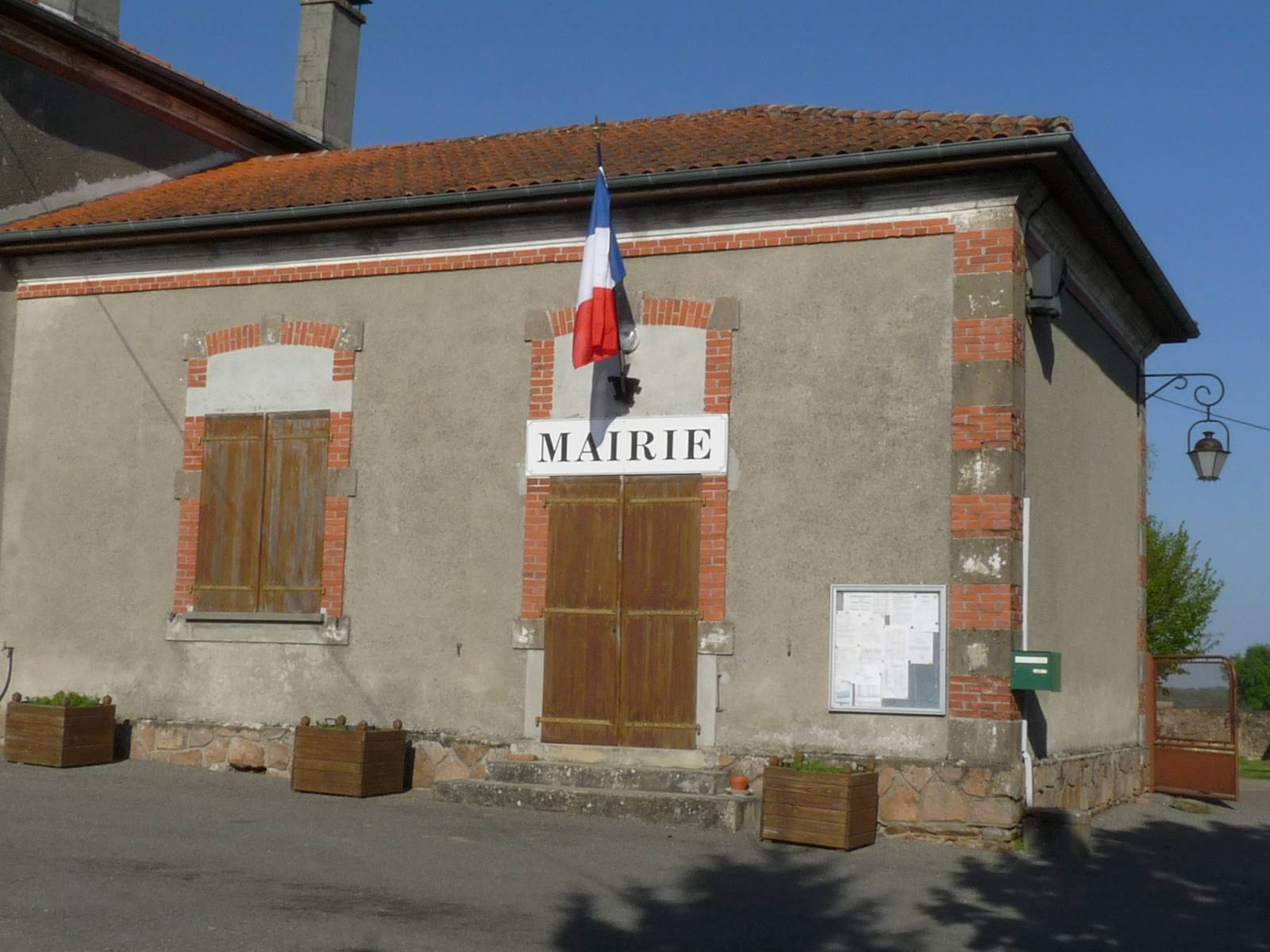
- The town hall in Mouzon
- Location of Mouzon
- Location within France Location within Nouvelle-Aquitaine
- Coordinates: 45°48′23″N 0°36′57″E
- Country: France
- Region: Nouvelle-Aquitaine
- Department: Charente
- Arrondissement: Confolens
- Canton: Charente-Bonnieure

Government
  - Mayor (2020–2026): Daniel Brandy
- Area^{1}: 10.62 km^{2} (4.10 sq mi)
- Elevation: 273 m (896 ft)
- Highest elevation: 316 m (1,037 ft)
- Lowest elevation: 220 m (720 ft)
- Population (2023): 142
  - Density: 13.4/km^{2} (34.6/sq mi)
- Time zone: UTC+01:00 (CET)
  - Summer (DST): UTC+02:00 (CEST)
- INSEE/Postal code: 16239 /16310
- ^{1} French Land Register data, which excludes lakes, ponds, glaciers > 1 km^{2} (0.386 sq mi or 247 acres) and river estuaries.

Mouzon (French pronunciation: [muzɔ̃]; Occitan: Mausom) is a commune in the Charente department in southwestern France.

== Population ==
Historical population
Year	Pop.	±% p.a.
1968	240	—
1975	193	−3.07%
1982	160	−2.64%
1990	155	−0.40%
1999	149	−0.44%
2007	147	−0.17%
2012	132	−2.13%
2017	131	−0.15%
2023	142	+1.35%
Source: INSEE

== See also ==
- Communes of the Charente department
