= Massignac =

- Commune
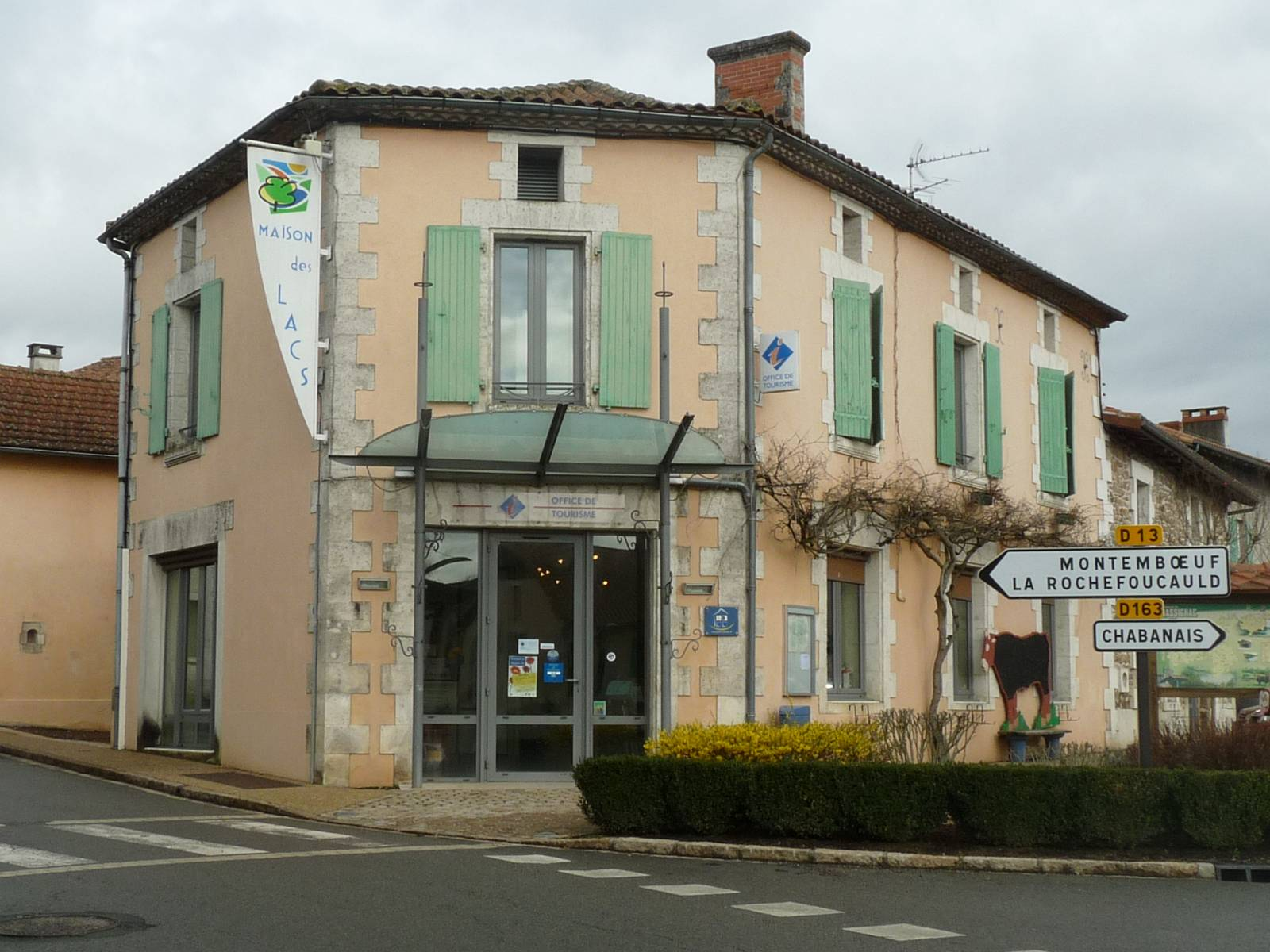
- Tourist office
- Location of Massignac
- Location within France Location within Nouvelle-Aquitaine
- Coordinates: 45°46′51″N 0°39′18″E
- Country: France
- Region: Nouvelle-Aquitaine
- Department: Charente
- Arrondissement: Confolens
- Canton: Charente-Bonnieure

Government
  - Mayor (2020–2026): Jean-Pierre Compain
- Area^{1}: 23.93 km^{2} (9.24 sq mi)
- Elevation: 269 m (883 ft)
- Highest elevation: 290 m (950 ft)
- Lowest elevation: 214 m (702 ft)
- Population (2023): 358
  - Density: 15.0/km^{2} (38.7/sq mi)
- Time zone: UTC+01:00 (CET)
  - Summer (DST): UTC+02:00 (CEST)
- INSEE/Postal code: 16212 /16310
- ^{1} French Land Register data, which excludes lakes, ponds, glaciers > 1 km^{2} (0.386 sq mi or 247 acres) and river estuaries.

Massignac (French pronunciation: [masiɲak]; Occitan: Massinhac) is a commune in the Charente department in southwestern France.

== Population ==
Historical population
Year	Pop.	±% p.a.
1968	745	—
1975	620	−2.59%
1982	515	−2.62%
1990	451	−1.65%
1999	401	−1.30%
2007	411	+0.31%
2012	392	−0.94%
2017	390	−0.10%
2023	358	−1.42%
Source: INSEE

== See also ==
- Communes of the Charente department
