= Chasseneuil-sur-Bonnieure =

- Commune
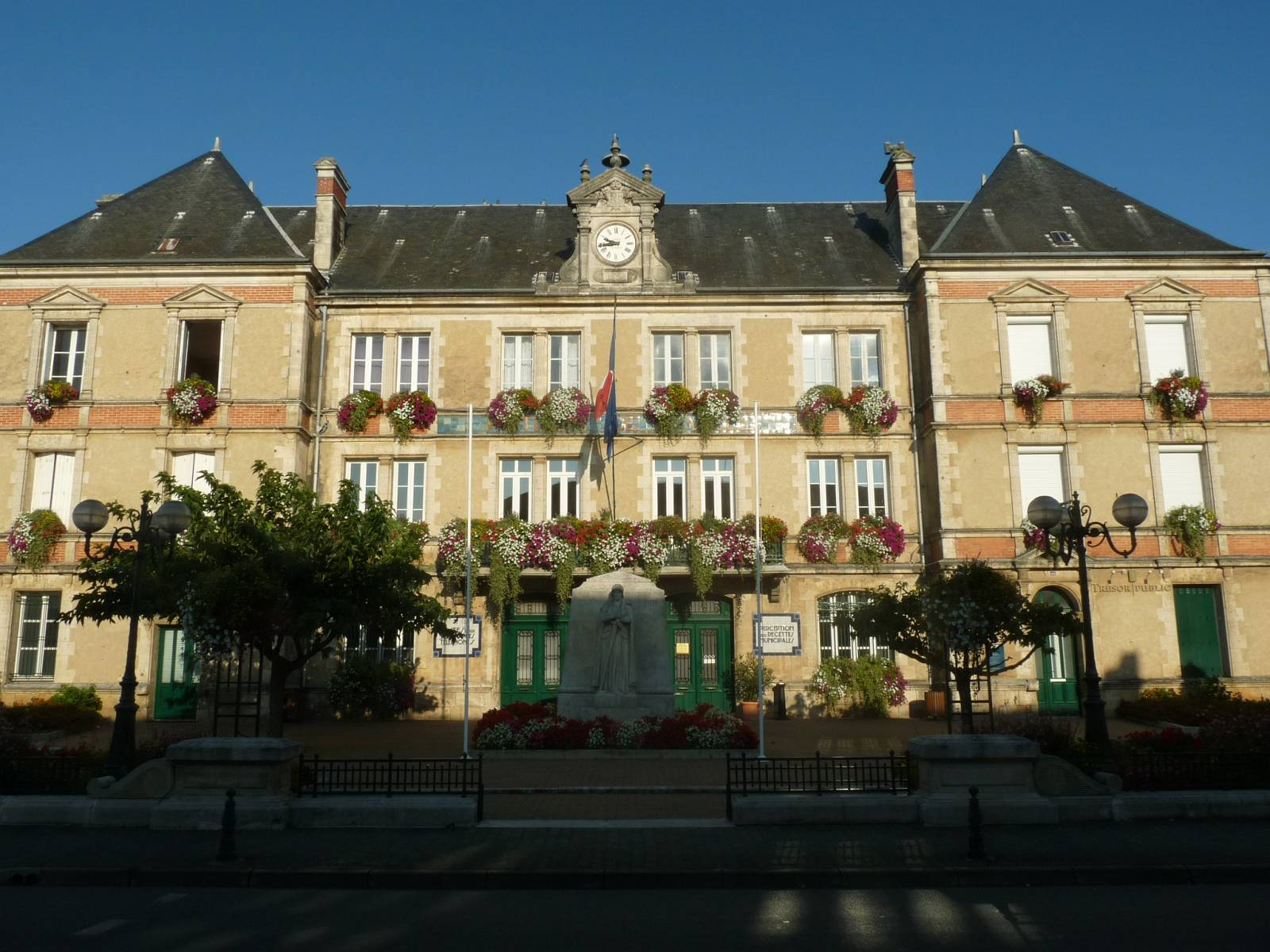
- Town hall

- Coat of arms
- Location of Chasseneuil-sur-Bonnieure
- Location within France Location within Nouvelle-Aquitaine
- Coordinates: 45°49′29″N 0°27′03″E
- Country: France
- Region: Nouvelle-Aquitaine
- Department: Charente
- Arrondissement: Confolens
- Canton: Charente-Bonnieure
- Intercommunality: Charente Limousine

Government
  - Mayor (2020–2026): Fabrice Point
- Area^{1}: 33.34 km^{2} (12.87 sq mi)
- Highest elevation: 174 m (571 ft)
- Lowest elevation: 91 m (299 ft)
- Population (2023): 3,111
  - Density: 93.31/km^{2} (241.7/sq mi)
- Time zone: UTC+01:00 (CET)
  - Summer (DST): UTC+02:00 (CEST)
- INSEE/Postal code: 16085 /16260
- ^{1} French Land Register data, which excludes lakes, ponds, glaciers > 1 km^{2} (0.386 sq mi or 247 acres) and river estuaries.

Chasseneuil-sur-Bonnieure (French pronunciation: [ʃasnœj syʁ bɔnjœʁ], literally Chasseneuil on Bonnieure, before 1962: Chasseneuil) is a commune in the Charente department in southwestern France.

== Population ==
Historical population

Year	Pop.	±% p.a.
1793	1,850	—
1800	1,461	−3.32%
1806	1,615	+1.68%
1821	1,719	+0.42%
1831	1,821	+0.58%
1841	2,167	+1.75%
1846	2,210	+0.39%
1851	2,321	+0.98%
1856	2,229	−0.81%
1861	2,178	−0.46%
1866	2,162	−0.15%
1872	2,174	+0.09%
1876	2,204	+0.34%
1881	2,492	+2.49%
1886	2,550	+0.46%
1891	2,463	−0.69%
1896	2,471	+0.06%
1901	2,356	−0.95%

Year	Pop.	±% p.a.
1906	2,508	+1.26%
1911	2,496	−0.10%
1921	2,508	+0.05%
1926	2,422	−0.70%
1931	2,538	+0.94%
1936	2,525	−0.10%
1946	2,486	−0.16%
1954	2,783	+1.42%
1962	2,723	−0.27%
1968	2,790	+0.41%
1975	2,803	+0.07%
1982	2,903	+0.50%
1990	2,791	−0.49%
1999	2,786	−0.02%
2007	2,916	+0.57%
2012	3,076	+1.07%
2017	3,046	−0.20%
2023	3,111	+0.35%

Source: EHESS and INSEE (1968-2023)

== See also ==
- Communes of the Charente department
