= Turgon, Charente =

Turgon
- Commune
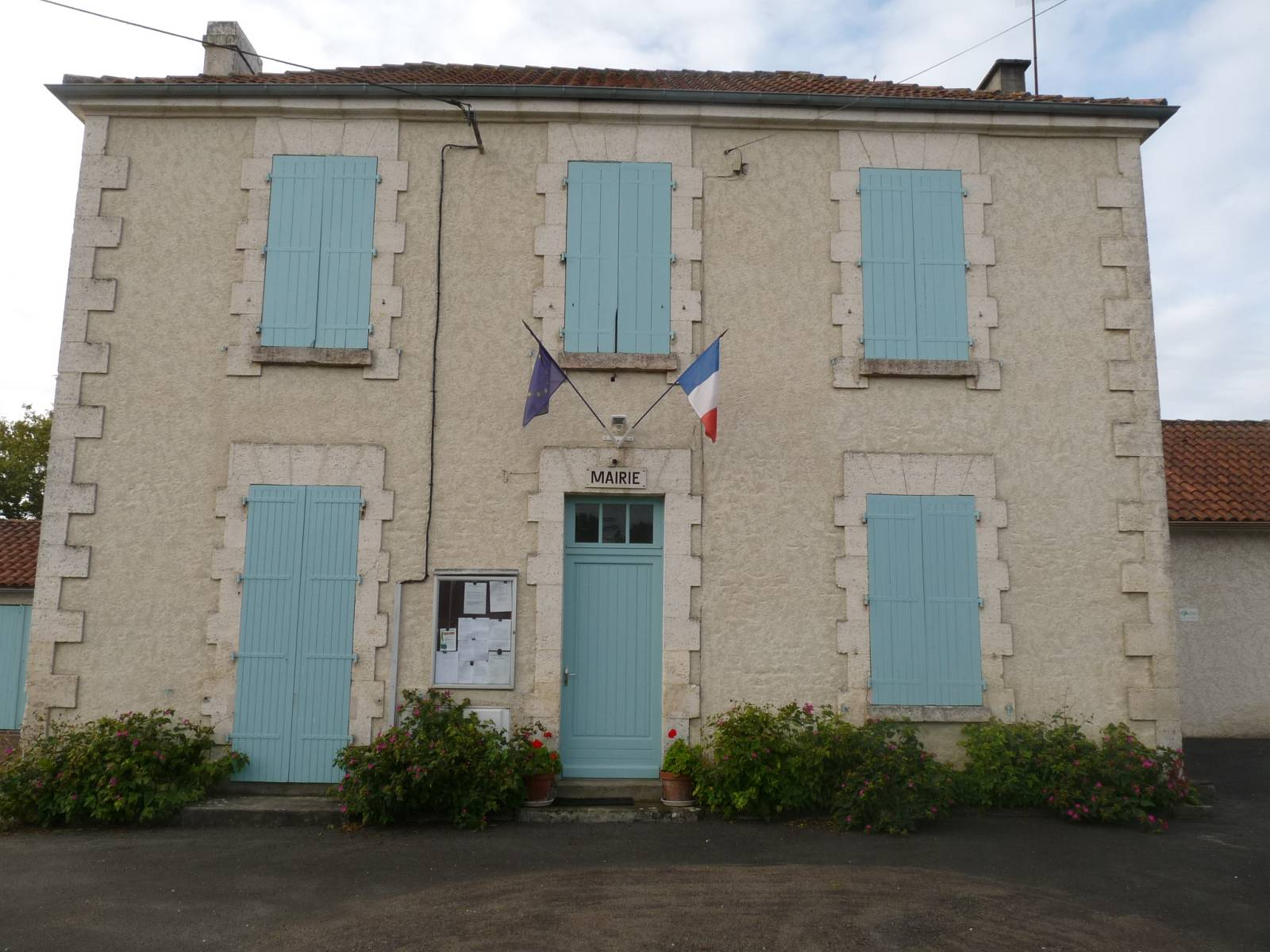
- Town hall
- Location of Turgon
- Location within France Location within Nouvelle-Aquitaine
- Coordinates: 45°57′02″N 0°24′03″E
- Country: France
- Region: Nouvelle-Aquitaine
- Department: Charente
- Arrondissement: Confolens
- Canton: Charente-Bonnieure
- Intercommunality: Charente Limousine

Government
  - Mayor (2020–2026): Régis Martin
- Area^{1}: 7.26 km^{2} (2.80 sq mi)
- Elevation: 180 m (590 ft)
- Highest elevation: 183 m (600 ft)
- Lowest elevation: 134 m (440 ft)
- Population (2023): 80
  - Density: 11/km^{2} (29/sq mi)
- Time zone: UTC+01:00 (CET)
  - Summer (DST): UTC+02:00 (CEST)
- INSEE/Postal code: 16389 /16350
- ^{1} French Land Register data, which excludes lakes, ponds, glaciers > 1 km^{2} (0.386 sq mi or 247 acres) and river estuaries.

Turgon (French pronunciation: [tyʁɡɔ̃]; Occitan: Turgont) is a commune in the Charente department in southwestern France.

== Population ==
Historical population
Year	Pop.	±% p.a.
1968	134	—
1975	129	−0.54%
1982	112	−2.00%
1990	110	−0.22%
1999	85	−2.82%
2007	93	+1.13%
2012	85	−1.78%
2017	86	+0.23%
2023	80	−1.20%
Source: INSEE

== See also ==
- Communes of the Charente department
