= Chassiecq =

- Commune
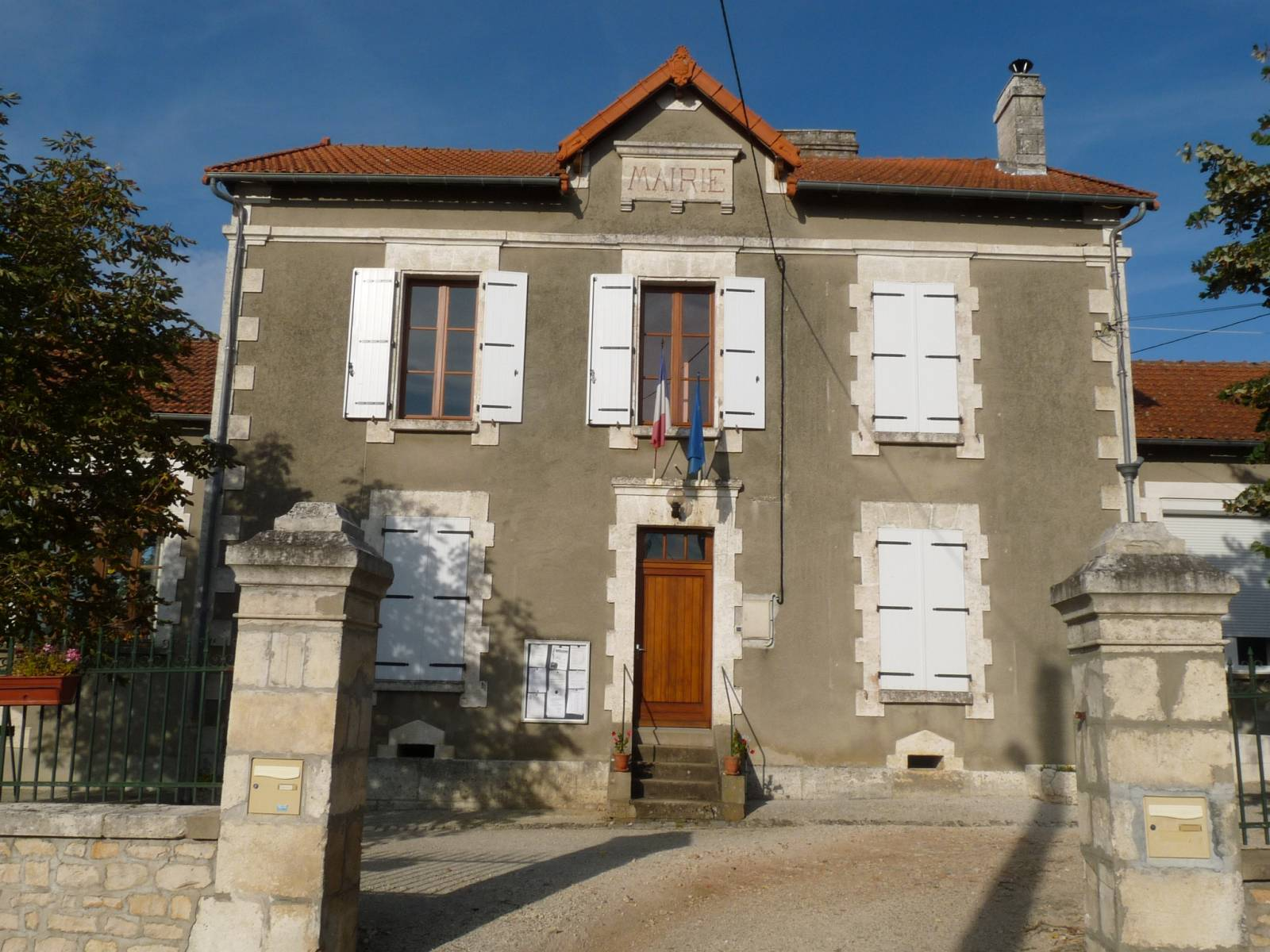
- Town hall
- Location of Chassiecq
- Location within France Location within Nouvelle-Aquitaine
- Coordinates: 45°57′17″N 0°22′48″E
- Country: France
- Region: Nouvelle-Aquitaine
- Department: Charente
- Arrondissement: Confolens
- Canton: Charente-Bonnieure

Government
  - Mayor (2020–2026): Yvonne Debord
- Area^{1}: 13.06 km^{2} (5.04 sq mi)
- Elevation: 150 m (490 ft)
- Highest elevation: 175 m (574 ft)
- Lowest elevation: 100 m (330 ft)
- Population (2023): 147
  - Density: 11.3/km^{2} (29.2/sq mi)
- Time zone: UTC+01:00 (CET)
  - Summer (DST): UTC+02:00 (CEST)
- INSEE/Postal code: 16087 /16350
- ^{1} French Land Register data, which excludes lakes, ponds, glaciers > 1 km^{2} (0.386 sq mi or 247 acres) and river estuaries.

Chassiecq (French pronunciation: [ʃasjɛk]; Occitan: Chapciec) is a commune in the Charente department in southwestern France.

== Population ==
Historical population
Year	Pop.	±% p.a.
1968	262	—
1975	222	−2.34%
1982	193	−1.98%
1990	172	−1.43%
1999	168	−0.26%
2007	167	−0.07%
2012	166	−0.12%
2017	143	−2.94%
2023	147	+0.46%
Source: INSEE

== See also ==
- Communes of the Charente department
