= Le Bouchage, Charente =

Le Bouchage
- Commune
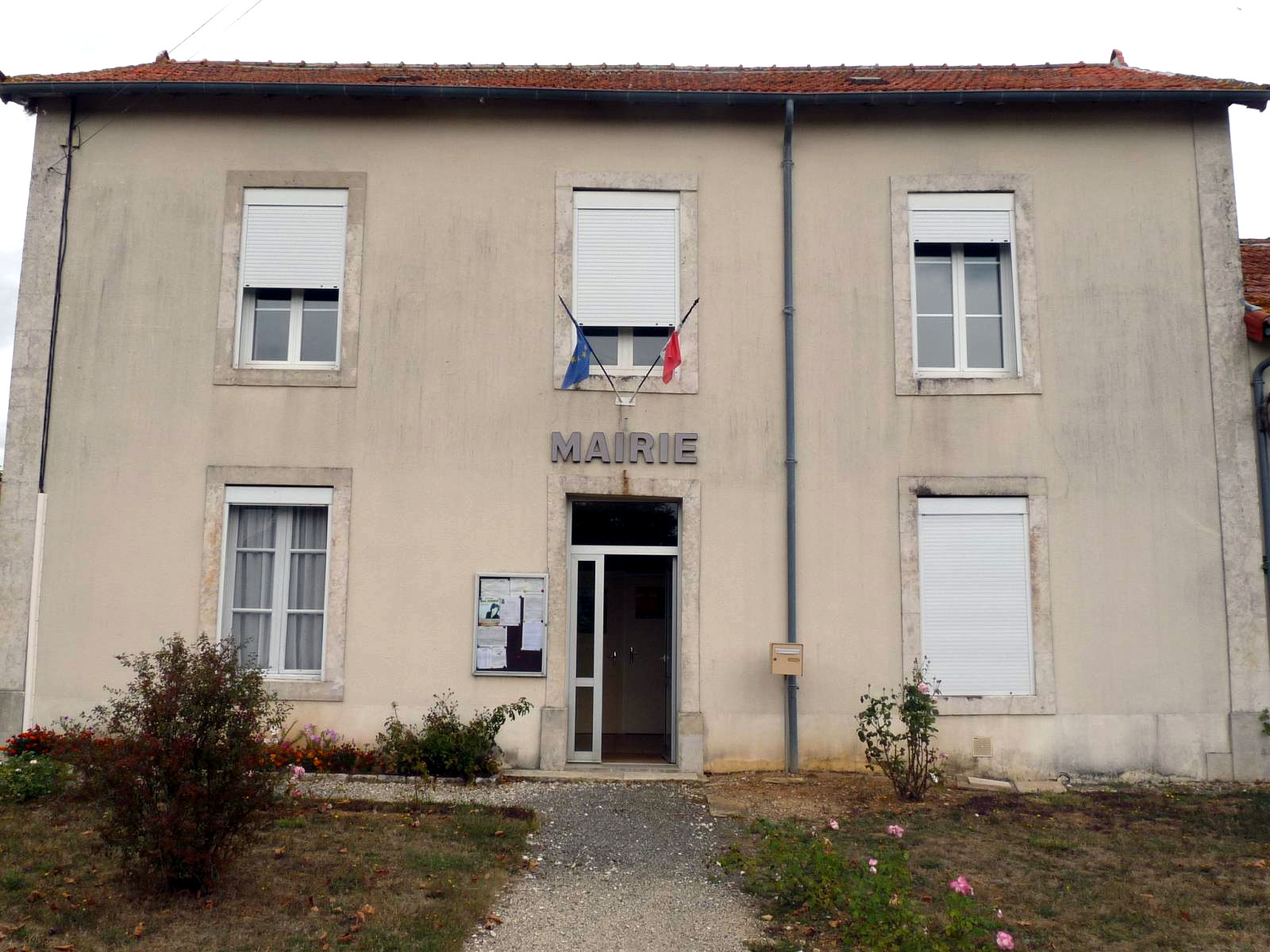
- Town hall
- Location of Le Bouchage
- Location within France Location within Nouvelle-Aquitaine
- Coordinates: 46°02′56″N 0°22′44″E
- Country: France
- Region: Nouvelle-Aquitaine
- Department: Charente
- Arrondissement: Confolens
- Canton: Charente-Bonnieure

Government
  - Mayor (2020–2026): Jean-Pierre Demon
- Area^{1}: 16.43 km^{2} (6.34 sq mi)
- Elevation: 191 m (627 ft)
- Highest elevation: 193 m (633 ft)
- Lowest elevation: 133 m (436 ft)
- Population (2023): 175
  - Density: 10.7/km^{2} (27.6/sq mi)
- Time zone: UTC+01:00 (CET)
  - Summer (DST): UTC+02:00 (CEST)
- INSEE/Postal code: 16054 /16350
- ^{1} French Land Register data, which excludes lakes, ponds, glaciers > 1 km^{2} (0.386 sq mi or 247 acres) and river estuaries.

Le Bouchage (French pronunciation: [lə buʃaʒ]) is a commune in the Charente department in southwestern France.

== Population ==
Historical population
Year	Pop.	±% p.a.
1968	290	—
1975	246	−2.32%
1982	232	−0.83%
1990	197	−2.02%
1999	190	−0.40%
2007	171	−1.31%
2012	159	−1.44%
2017	166	+0.87%
2023	175	+0.88%
Source: INSEE

== See also ==
- Communes of the Charente department
