= Lussac, Charente =

Lussac
- Commune
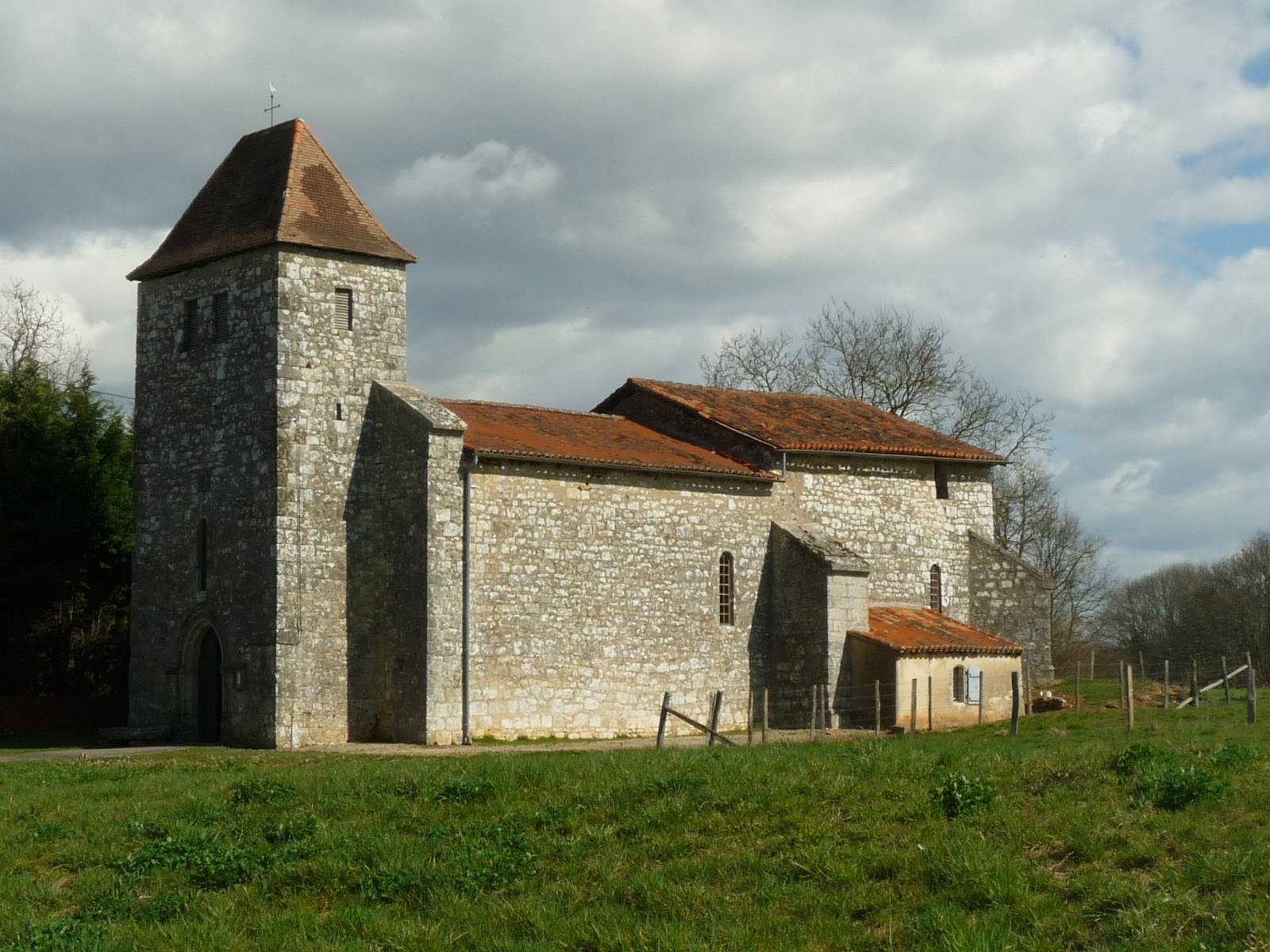
- The church in Lussac
- Location of Lussac
- Location within France Location within Nouvelle-Aquitaine
- Coordinates: 45°51′42″N 0°27′51″E
- Country: France
- Region: Nouvelle-Aquitaine
- Department: Charente
- Arrondissement: Confolens
- Canton: Charente-Bonnieure
- Intercommunality: Charente Limousine

Government
  - Mayor (2020–2026): Catherine Raynaud
- Area^{1}: 11.70 km^{2} (4.52 sq mi)
- Elevation: 155 m (509 ft)
- Highest elevation: 182 m (597 ft)
- Lowest elevation: 129 m (423 ft)
- Population (2023): 292
  - Density: 25.0/km^{2} (64.6/sq mi)
- Time zone: UTC+01:00 (CET)
  - Summer (DST): UTC+02:00 (CEST)
- INSEE/Postal code: 16195 /16450
- ^{1} French Land Register data, which excludes lakes, ponds, glaciers > 1 km^{2} (0.386 sq mi or 247 acres) and river estuaries.

Lussac (French pronunciation: [lysak]) is a commune in the Charente department in southwestern France.

== Population ==
Historical population
| Year | Pop. | ±% p.a. |
|---|---|---|
| 1968 | 230 | — |
| 1975 | 232 | +0.12% |
| 1982 | 273 | +2.35% |
| 1990 | 295 | +0.97% |
| 1999 | 291 | −0.15% |
| 2007 | 283 | −0.35% |
| 2012 | 288 | +0.35% |
| 2017 | 290 | +0.14% |
| 2023 | 292 | +0.11% |
Source: INSEE

== See also ==
- Communes of the Charente department
