= Saint-Claud =

- Commune
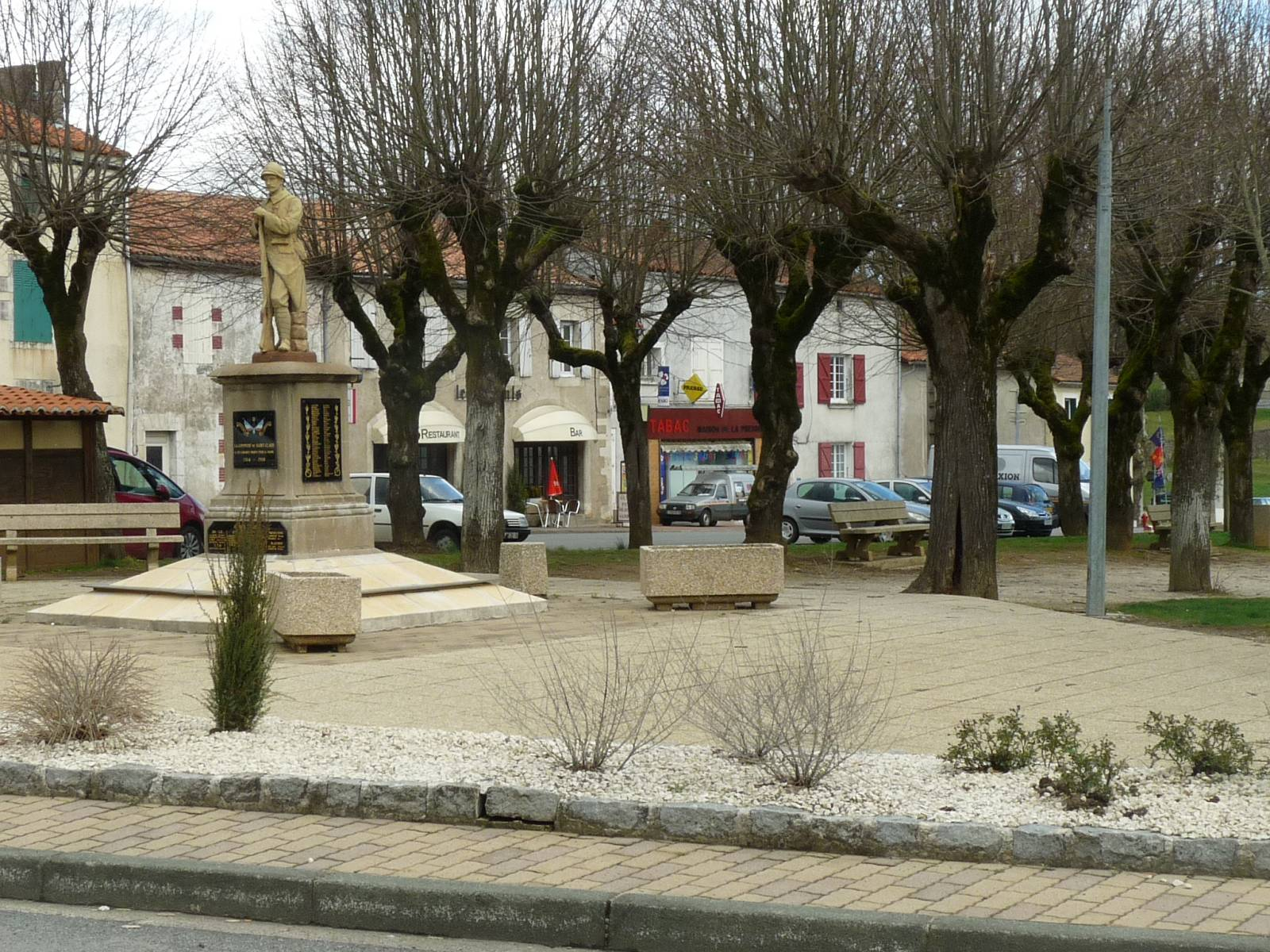
- Market place

- Coat of arms
- Location of Saint-Claud
- Location within France Location within Nouvelle-Aquitaine
- Coordinates: 45°53′46″N 0°27′56″E
- Country: France
- Region: Nouvelle-Aquitaine
- Department: Charente
- Arrondissement: Confolens
- Canton: Charente-Bonnieure
- Intercommunality: Charente Limousine

Government
  - Mayor (2020–2026): Pascal Dubuisson
- Area^{1}: 26.75 km^{2} (10.33 sq mi)
- Elevation: 144 m (472 ft)
- Highest elevation: 222 m (728 ft)
- Lowest elevation: 107 m (351 ft)
- Population (2023): 1,032
  - Density: 38.58/km^{2} (99.92/sq mi)
- Time zone: UTC+01:00 (CET)
  - Summer (DST): UTC+02:00 (CEST)
- INSEE/Postal code: 16308 /16450
- ^{1} French Land Register data, which excludes lakes, ponds, glaciers > 1 km^{2} (0.386 sq mi or 247 acres) and river estuaries.

Saint-Claud (French pronunciation: [sɛ̃ klo]; Occitan: Sent Claud) is a commune in the Charente department in southwestern France.

The small commune is located northeast of Angoulême.

== Population ==
Historical population
Year	Pop.	±% p.a.
1968	1,051	—
1975	1,004	−0.65%
1982	1,128	+1.68%
1990	1,128	+0.00%
1999	1,062	−0.67%
2007	1,099	+0.43%
2012	1,102	+0.05%
2017	1,057	−0.83%
2023	1,032	−0.40%
Source: INSEE

== Personalities ==
The commune is partly the ancestral home of Sir Wilfrid Laurier, Prime Minister of Canada from 1896 to 1911 (Laurier's ancestor was François Cottineau, who left his home named Champlaurier, located between the villages of Saint-Claud and Nieuil, for New France in 1677 as a member of the Régiment de Carignan-Salières). It was also the birthplace of the phonetician Jean-Pierre Rousselot.

== See also ==
- Communes of the Charente department
