= Roussines, Charente =

Roussines
- Commune
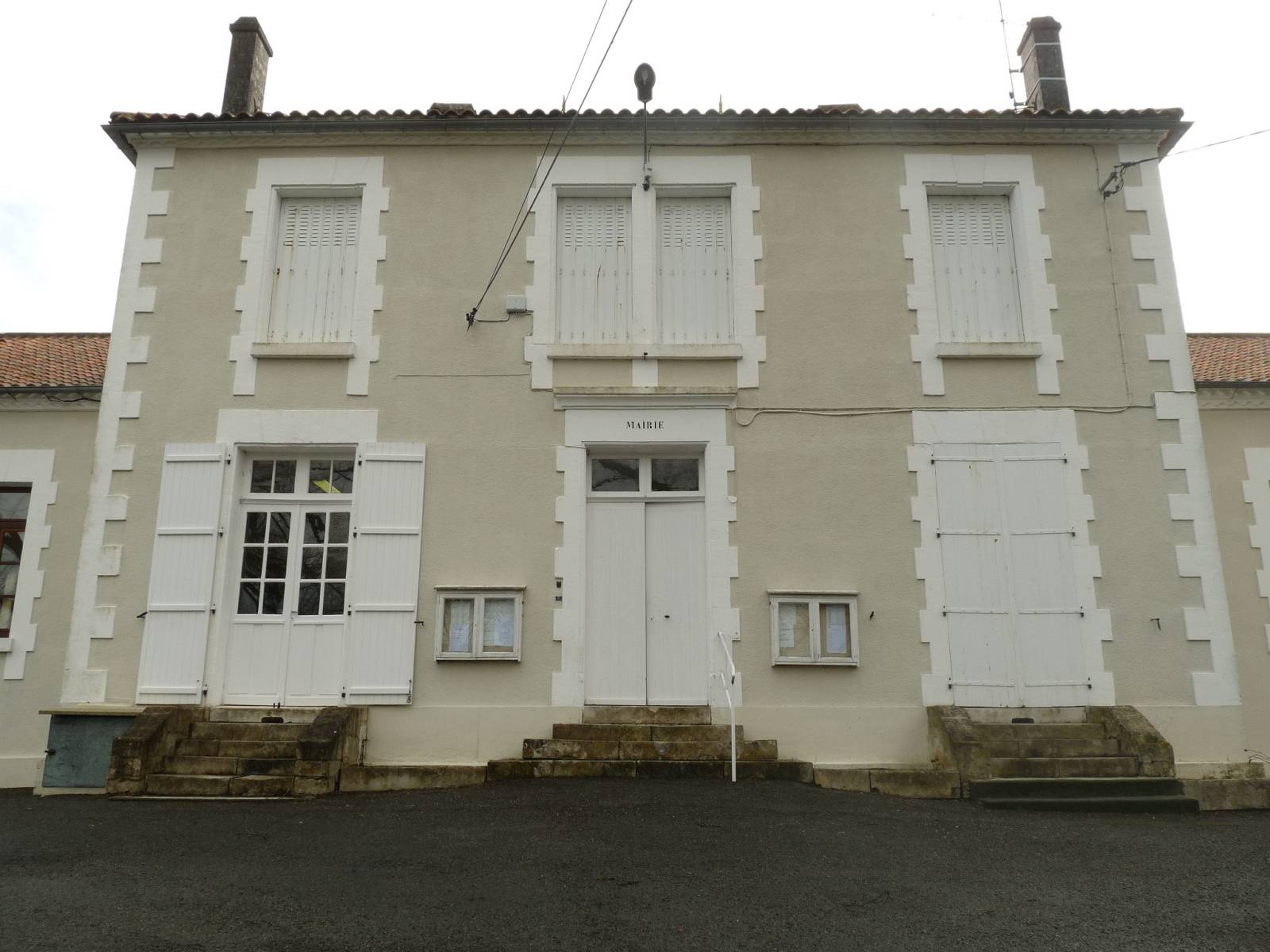
- The town hall in Roussines

- Coat of arms
- Location of Roussines
- Location within France Location within Nouvelle-Aquitaine
- Coordinates: 45°43′26″N 0°37′16″E
- Country: France
- Region: Nouvelle-Aquitaine
- Department: Charente
- Arrondissement: Confolens
- Canton: Charente-Bonnieure

Government
  - Mayor (2020–2026): Raymond Martin
- Area^{1}: 16.08 km^{2} (6.21 sq mi)
- Elevation: 236 m (774 ft)
- Highest elevation: 281 m (922 ft)
- Lowest elevation: 147 m (482 ft)
- Population (2023): 298
  - Density: 18.5/km^{2} (48.0/sq mi)
- Time zone: UTC+01:00 (CET)
  - Summer (DST): UTC+02:00 (CEST)
- INSEE/Postal code: 16289 /16310
- ^{1} French Land Register data, which excludes lakes, ponds, glaciers > 1 km^{2} (0.386 sq mi or 247 acres) and river estuaries.

Roussines (French pronunciation: [ʁusin]; Occitan: Rossinas) is a commune in the Charente department in southwestern France.

== Population ==
Historical population
Year	Pop.	±% p.a.
1968	504	—
1975	442	−1.86%
1982	396	−1.56%
1990	374	−0.71%
1999	301	−2.38%
2007	311	+0.41%
2012	264	−3.22%
2017	283	+1.40%
2023	298	+0.86%
Source: INSEE

== See also ==
- Communes of the Charente department
