= Suaux =

- Commune
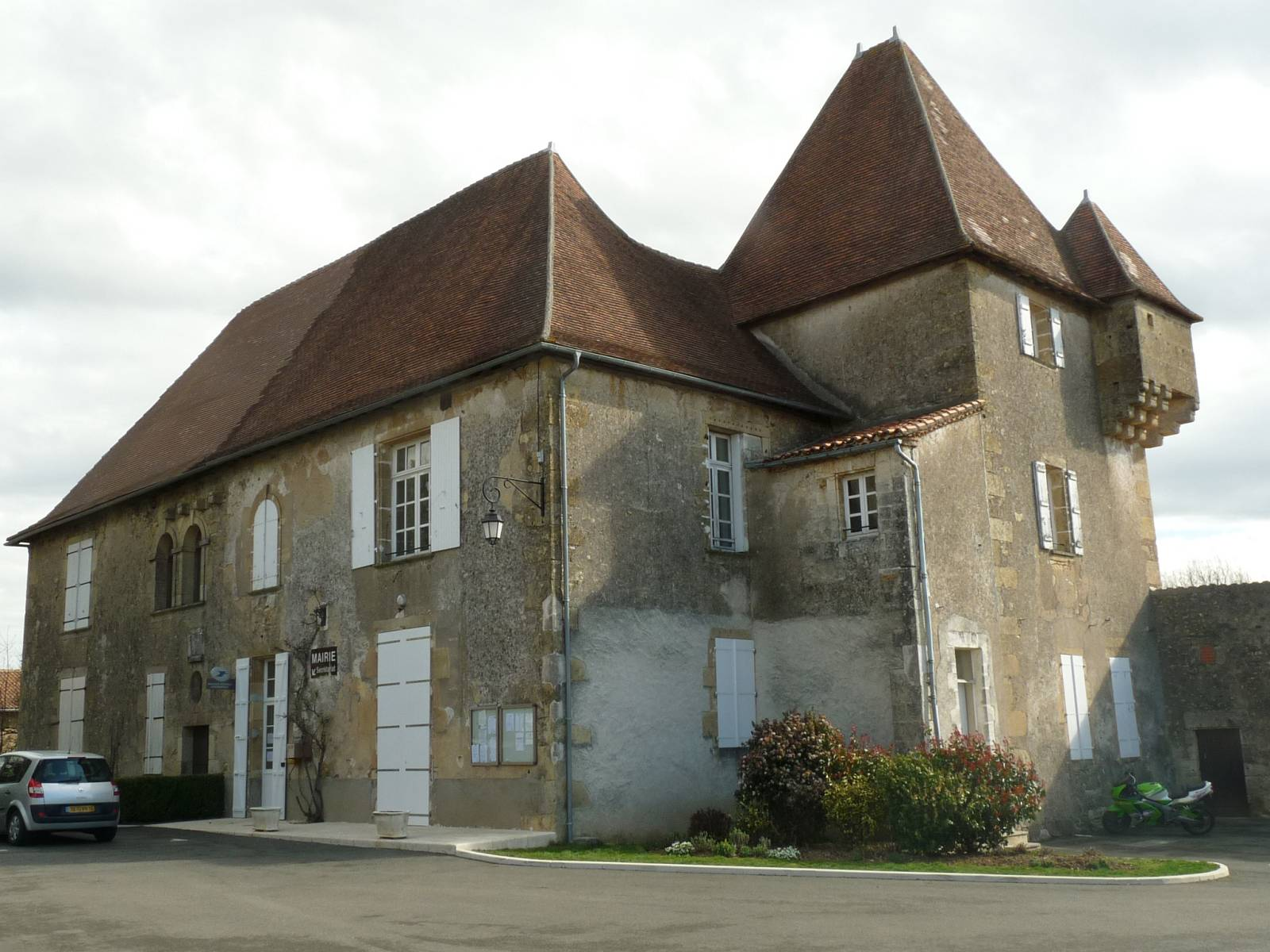
- Chateau used as the town hall

- Coat of arms
- Location of Suaux
- Location within France Location within Nouvelle-Aquitaine
- Coordinates: 45°51′09″N 0°30′25″E
- Country: France
- Region: Nouvelle-Aquitaine
- Department: Charente
- Arrondissement: Confolens
- Canton: Charente-Bonnieure

Government
  - Mayor (2020–2026): Olivier Périnet
- Area^{1}: 11.93 km^{2} (4.61 sq mi)
- Elevation: 184 m (604 ft)
- Highest elevation: 212 m (696 ft)
- Lowest elevation: 120 m (390 ft)
- Population (2023): 378
  - Density: 31.7/km^{2} (82.1/sq mi)
- Time zone: UTC+01:00 (CET)
  - Summer (DST): UTC+02:00 (CEST)
- INSEE/Postal code: 16375 /16260
- ^{1} French Land Register data, which excludes lakes, ponds, glaciers > 1 km^{2} (0.386 sq mi or 247 acres) and river estuaries.

Suaux (French pronunciation: [sɥo]) is a commune in the Charente department in southwestern France.

== Population ==
Historical population
Year	Pop.	±% p.a.
1968	484	—
1975	460	−0.72%
1982	373	−2.95%
1990	367	−0.20%
1999	356	−0.34%
2007	370	+0.48%
2012	409	+2.02%
2017	390	−0.95%
2023	378	−0.52%
Source: INSEE

== See also ==
- Communes of the Charente department
