= Saint-Coutant, Charente =

Saint-Coutant
- Commune
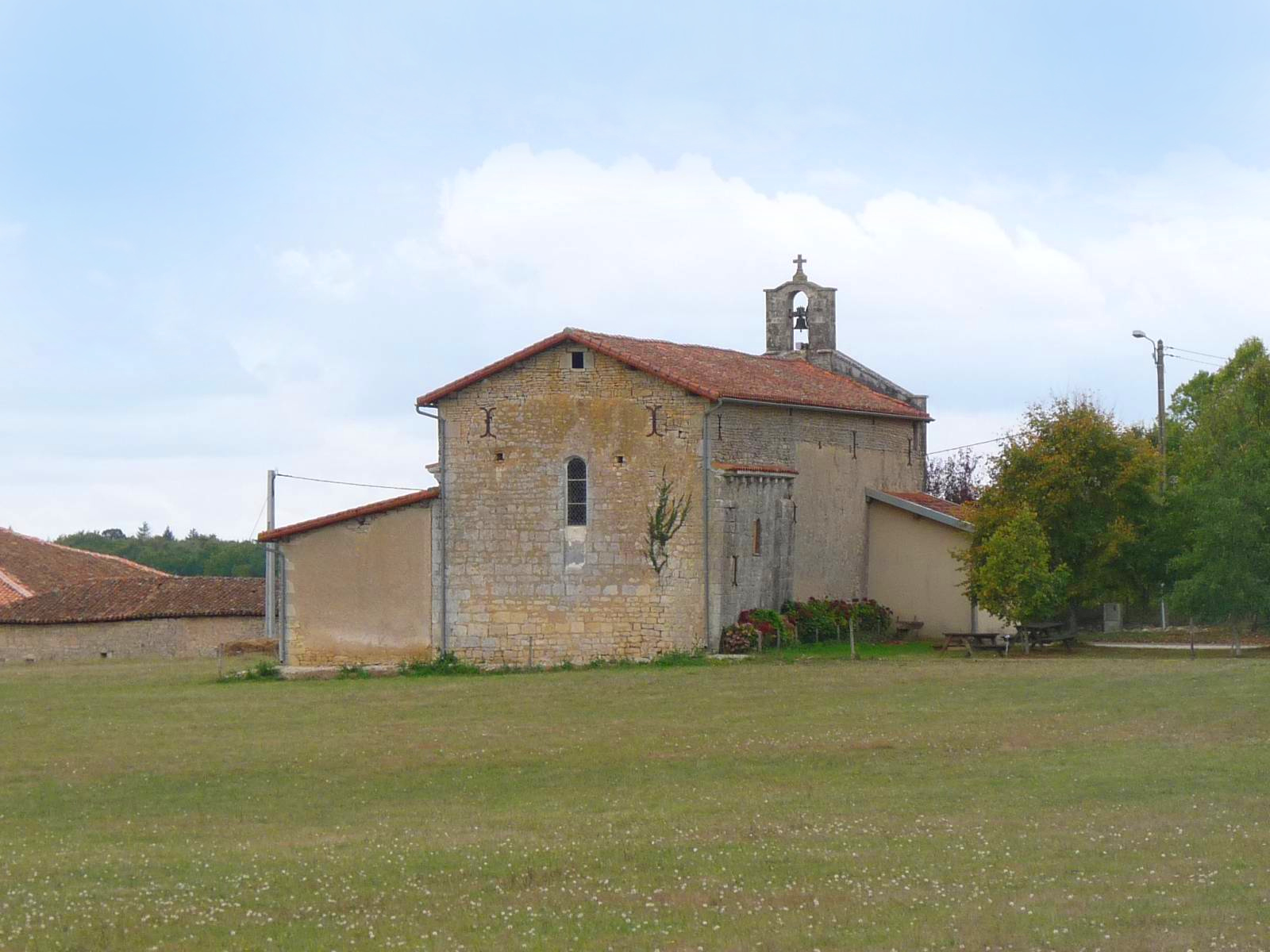
- The church in Saint-Coutant

- Coat of arms
- Location of Saint-Coutant
- Location within France Location within Nouvelle-Aquitaine
- Coordinates: 45°59′46″N 0°27′36″E
- Country: France
- Region: Nouvelle-Aquitaine
- Department: Charente
- Arrondissement: Confolens
- Canton: Charente-Bonnieure

Government
  - Mayor (2020–2026): Ludovic Audouin
- Area^{1}: 19.40 km^{2} (7.49 sq mi)
- Elevation: 190 m (620 ft)
- Highest elevation: 197 m (646 ft)
- Lowest elevation: 133 m (436 ft)
- Population (2023): 206
  - Density: 10.6/km^{2} (27.5/sq mi)
- Time zone: UTC+01:00 (CET)
  - Summer (DST): UTC+02:00 (CEST)
- INSEE/Postal code: 16310 /16350
- ^{1} French Land Register data, which excludes lakes, ponds, glaciers > 1 km^{2} (0.386 sq mi or 247 acres) and river estuaries.

Saint-Coutant (French pronunciation: [sɛ̃ kutɑ̃]) is a commune in the Charente department in southwestern France.

== Population ==
Historical population
Year	Pop.	±% p.a.
1968	391	—
1975	332	−2.31%
1982	284	−2.21%
1990	259	−1.15%
1999	223	−1.65%
2007	216	−0.40%
2012	220	+0.37%
2017	220	+0.00%
2023	206	−1.09%
Source: INSEE

== See also ==
- Communes of the Charente department
