= Anais, Charente =

Anais
- Commune
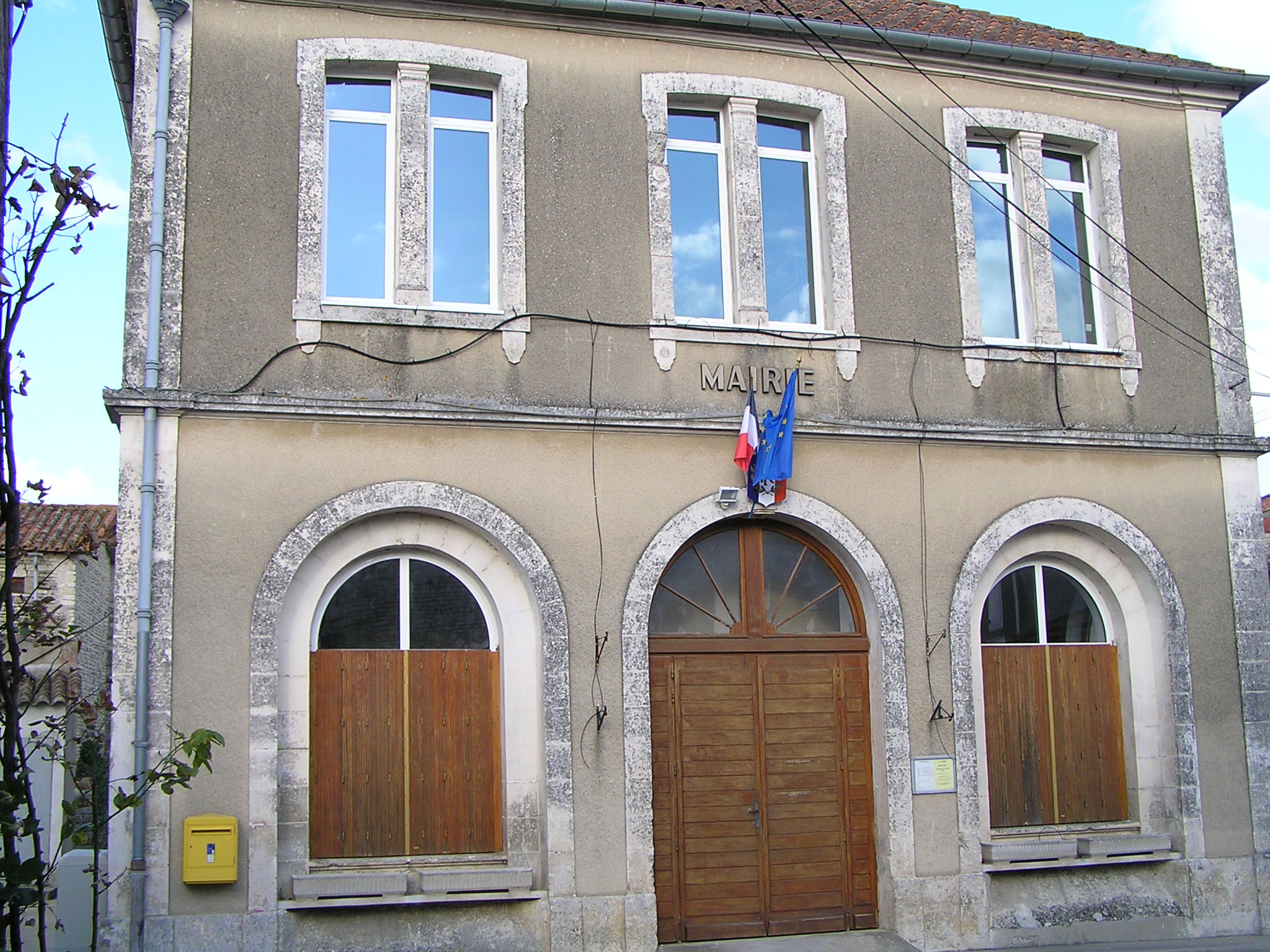
- Anais Town Hall

- Coat of arms
- Location of Anais
- Location within France Location within Nouvelle-Aquitaine
- Coordinates: 45°46′30″N 0°12′36″E
- Country: France
- Region: Nouvelle-Aquitaine
- Department: Charente
- Arrondissement: Confolens
- Canton: Boixe-et-Manslois
- Intercommunality: Cœur de Charente

Government
  - Mayor (2020–2026): Éric Giraud-Bernard
- Area^{1}: 9.87 km^{2} (3.81 sq mi)
- Elevation: 75 m (246 ft)
- Highest elevation: 139 m (456 ft)
- Lowest elevation: 60 m (200 ft)
- Population (2023): 587
  - Density: 59.5/km^{2} (154/sq mi)
- Time zone: UTC+01:00 (CET)
  - Summer (DST): UTC+02:00 (CEST)
- INSEE/Postal code: 16011 /16560
- ^{1} French Land Register data, which excludes lakes, ponds, glaciers > 1 km^{2} (0.386 sq mi or 247 acres) and river estuaries.

Anais (French pronunciation: [anɛ]) is a commune in the Charente department in the Nouvelle-Aquitaine region of southwestern France.

== Geography ==
=== Location and access ===
Anais is located 14 km north of Angoulême. It is crossed from north to south by National Highway N10 from Angoulême to Poitiers which passes 1.5 km west of the town and is a landscaped expressway of four lanes.

Anais is also 4 km west of Jauldes, 6 km south-east of Saint-Amant-de-Boixe - the chief town of the district, 7 km east of Vars, 11 km south of Mansle, and 5 km north-west of Brie.

The commune is traversed from east to west by the D11 road from Chasseneuil to Rouillac via Vars which passes through the village and continues to join the N10 by an interchange on the western border of the commune. The D45 road also goes from the village south to La Chignolle as well as the D113 from Montignac-Charente in the west to Cherves in the east.

Anais is 5 km north of Angoulême airport. The nearest train station is that at Angoulême.

=== Localities and hamlets ===
The town has two large hamlets or villages as big as Anais town: Le Breuil d'Anais located to the south-east, and Churet to the south on the old national highway 10 near La Chignolle in Champniers commune.

To the west of the town the area of La Touche has developed due to the interchange on the N10. The commune also has many small hamlets and farms: La Claviere, Puymenier, les Nomblières, Puyfrançais, les Rivauds, Romefort, la Poutardière, etc.

=== Geology and terrain ===
The soil of the town is made up of limestone dating from the Late Jurassic (Kimmeridgian). The Argence Valley has alluvium from the Quaternary (gritty clay and Peat).

The relief of the commune is that of a plateau with an average altitude of 100 m traversed from north to south by a small valley - the Argence Valley - which is a Dry valley starting from Argence and descending to Anais. The highest point in the commune is at an altitude of 139 m and is located on the western boundary at the Vieille Touche (the Puy Delan). The lowest point is at 60 m located along the southerly limit of the Argence at Churet. The town is 80 m above sea level.

=== Hydrography ===
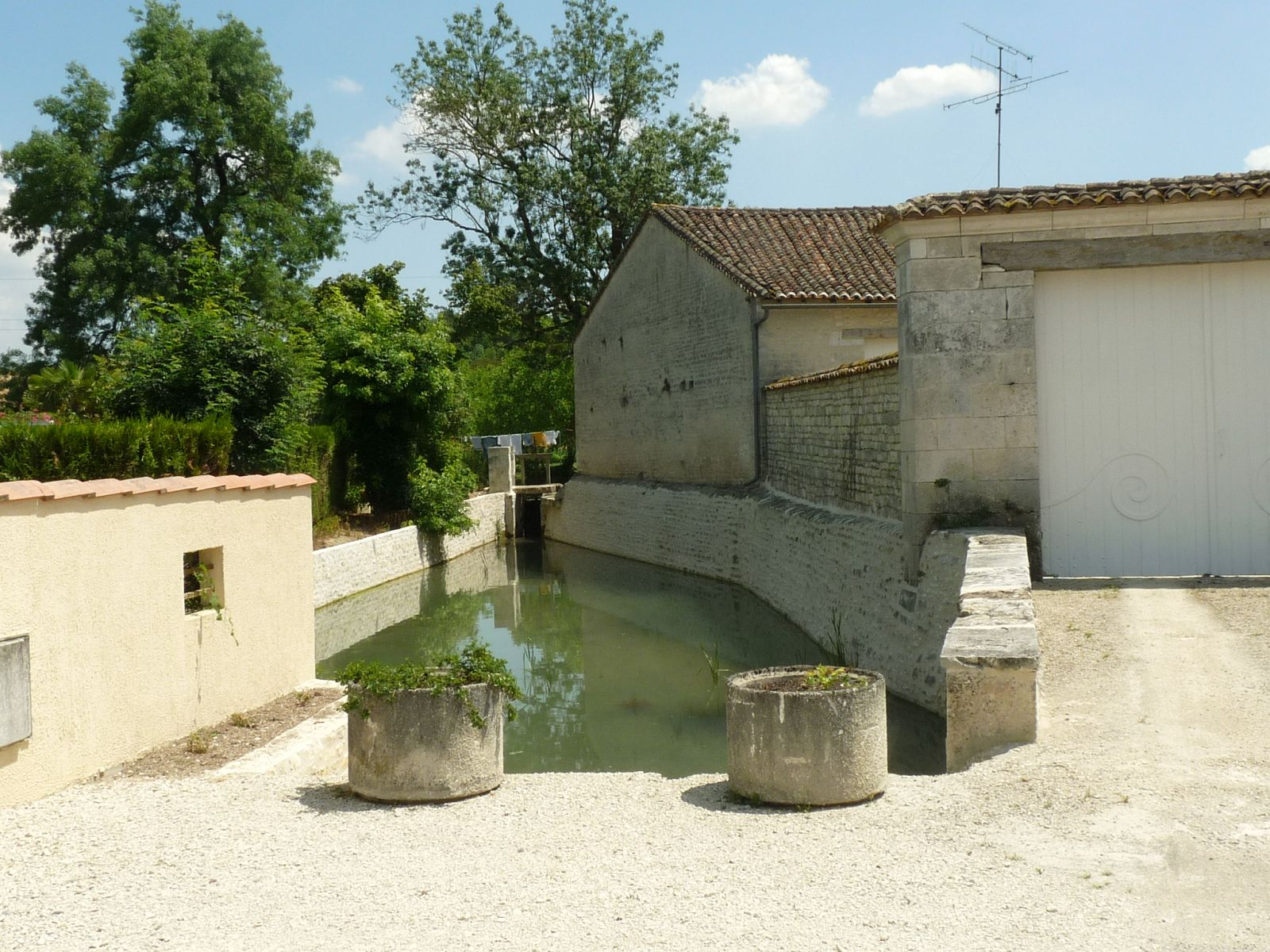
The Argence at Churet

The commune is traversed by the Argence, a tributary of the right bank of the Charente at Balzac. The Argence is formed from two small tributaries: the Ruisseau du Moulin des Rivauds which rises in the east and l'Étang which has its source in the north with the river Argence taking its name downstream of the town. The Fountaine de Maillou at the southern border near Churet also feeds the Argence.

=== Climate ===
As in the southern three-quarters and west of the department, the climate is oceanic Aquitaine.

== Toponymy ==
Anais is derived from the Latin Annacum or Villa Anni, meaning that the village was built around the property of a rich Gallo-Roman named Annus.

The hamlet of Breuil d'Anais takes its name from the Low Latin brogilum which is of Gallic origin from brogilos, meaning "small wood".

== History ==
Aerial archaeology has revealed the moat and the foundations of a medieval castle.

== Administration ==
From 1793 to 1801 Anais was in the canton of Jandes then passed to the Canton of Saint-Amant-de-Boixe. (Note: This could be a typing error on the Cassini database: should be canton of Jaudes)

List of Successive Mayors

| From | To | Name | Party | Position |
|---|---|---|---|---|
| 1977 | 2014 | Jacky Bertrand | UMP | Professor |
| 2014 | 2026 | Éric Giraud-Bernard | | |

== Population ==
Historical population
| Year | Pop. | ±% p.a. |
|---|---|---|
| 1968 | 374 | — |
| 1975 | 420 | +1.67% |
| 1982 | 439 | +0.63% |
| 1990 | 446 | +0.20% |
| 1999 | 466 | +0.49% |
| 2007 | 539 | +1.84% |
| 2012 | 595 | +2.00% |
| 2017 | 581 | −0.48% |
| 2023 | 587 | +0.17% |
Source: INSEE

== Economy ==
The main area of activity in Anais is at La Touche along the N10 where there is an Intermarché base (with 100-249 employees), trucks, a hotel restaurant, and various companies such as: Aluplast, AMS, Crousti'charente, Inomould, industrial boilermaker Guerin, SOMC and some Wholesalers, materials, tyres, and petroleum products.

In the town is a bakery with another in La Touche where there is a bakery company.

There are trade enterprises such as masonry, a general construction company, a farm, and a garage.

== Facilities, services, and local life ==
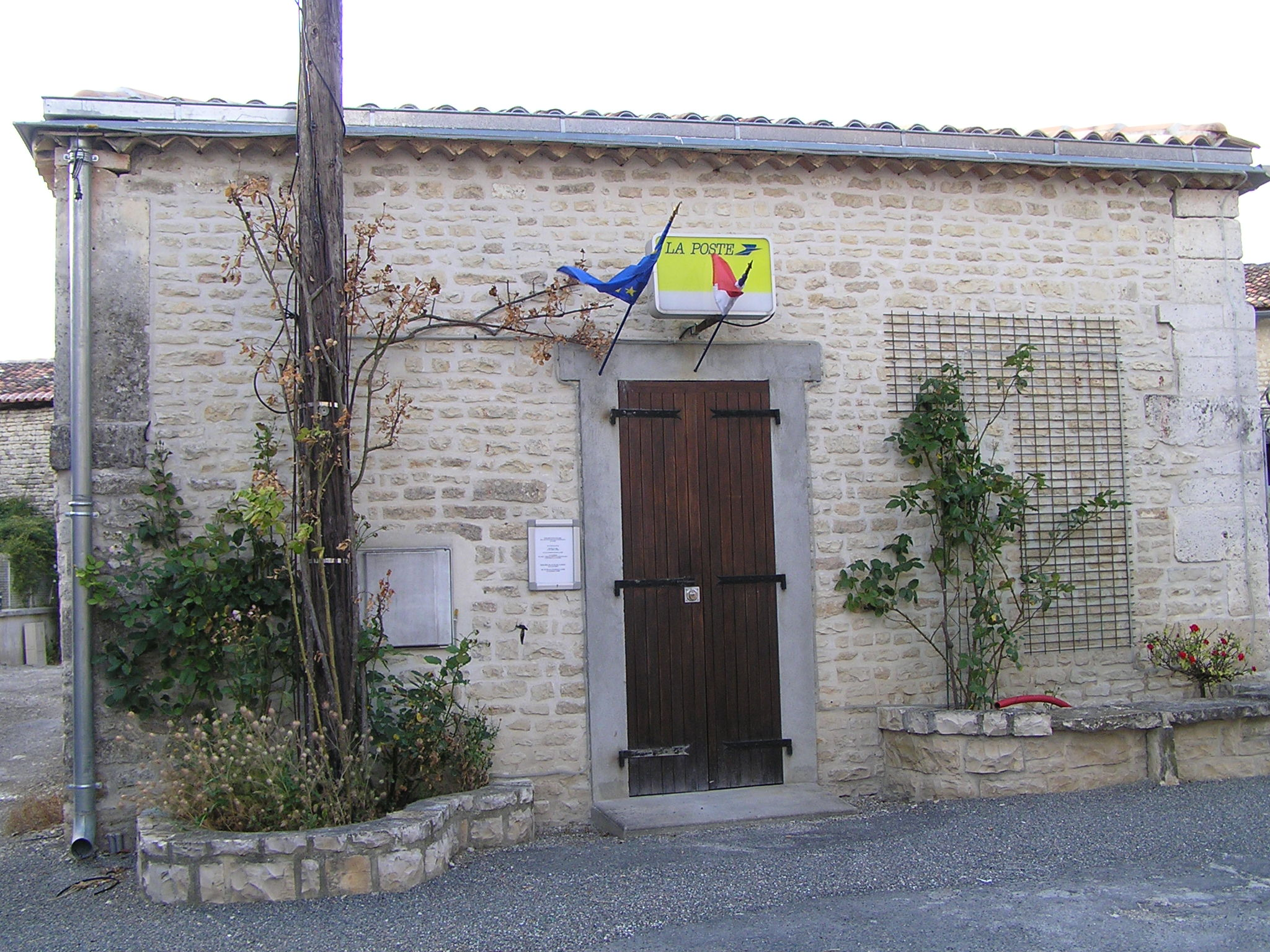
The Post Office

=== Education ===
The school is an RPI between Anais, Aussac-Vadalle, and Tourriers. Anais has a kindergarten and a primary school while Aussac-Vadalle and Tourriers have elementary schools.

== Sites and Monuments ==
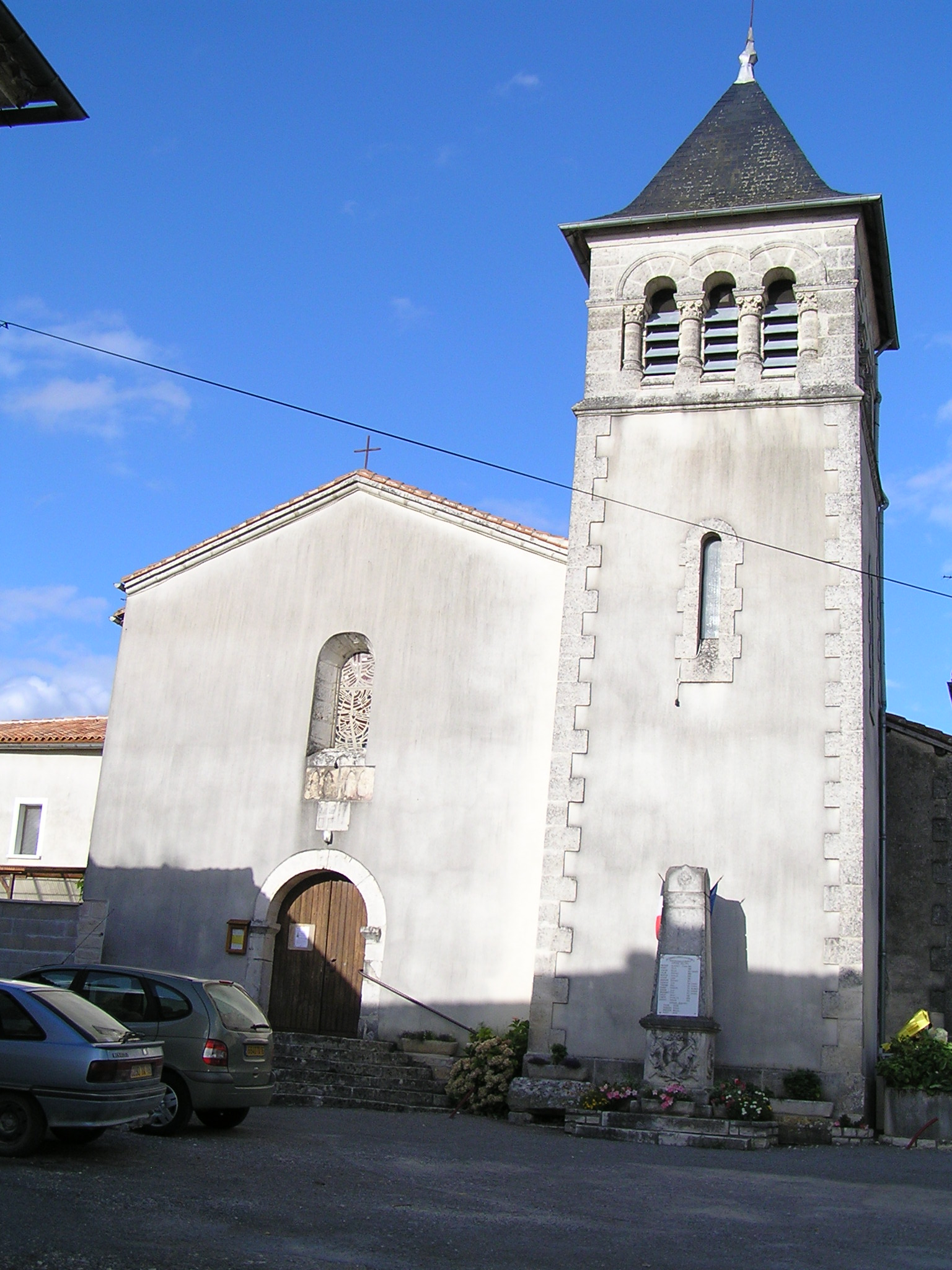
The Church

== See also ==
- Communes of the Charente department
