= Lonnes =

- Commune
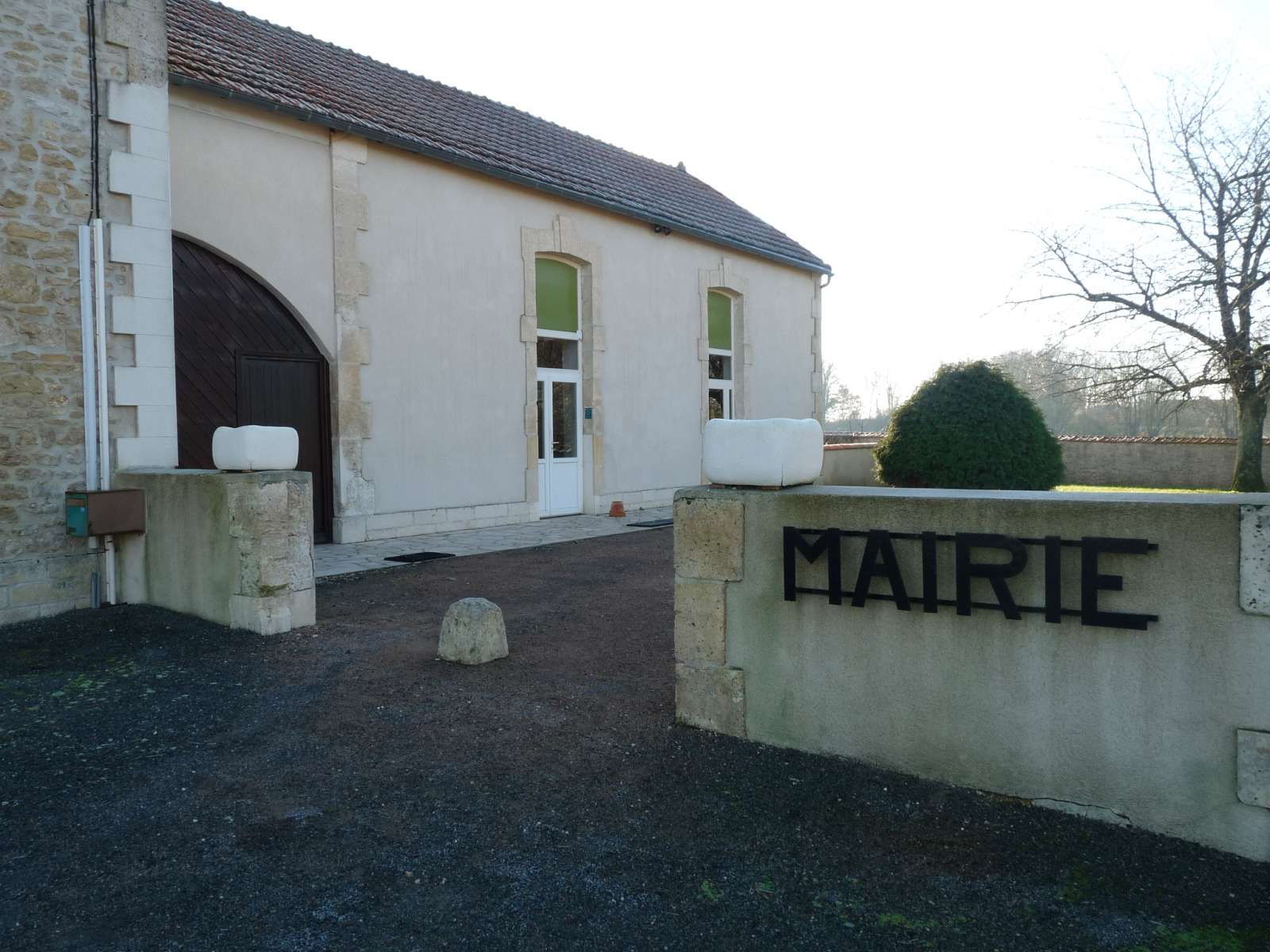
- The town hall in Lonnes
- Location of Lonnes
- Location within France Location within Nouvelle-Aquitaine
- Coordinates: 45°56′23″N 0°09′59″E
- Country: France
- Region: Nouvelle-Aquitaine
- Department: Charente
- Arrondissement: Confolens
- Canton: Boixe-et-Manslois

Government
  - Mayor (2020–2026): Pierre Chaussepied
- Area^{1}: 7.51 km^{2} (2.90 sq mi)
- Elevation: 125 m (410 ft)
- Highest elevation: 131 m (430 ft)
- Lowest elevation: 94 m (308 ft)
- Population (2023): 185
  - Density: 24.6/km^{2} (63.8/sq mi)
- Time zone: UTC+01:00 (CET)
  - Summer (DST): UTC+02:00 (CEST)
- INSEE/Postal code: 16191 /16230
- ^{1} French Land Register data, which excludes lakes, ponds, glaciers > 1 km^{2} (0.386 sq mi or 247 acres) and river estuaries.

Lonnes (French pronunciation: [lɔn]) is a commune in the Charente department in southwestern France.

== Geography ==
The commune is located in the north of the Charente. It extends north from Fontenille and is bisected by Route 186 and RN 10 for 3 km (1.9 mi).

It is 85 kilometres (53 mi)south of Poitiers and 64 kilometres (40 mi) north of Angoulême. The surrounding communities are, in alphabetical order: Aunac, Chenon, Fontenille, Juillé, Salles-de-Villefagnan and Verteuil-sur-Charente. In addition to the town of Lonnes, the commune has several villages: les Maisons Rouges, les Essarts, le Petit Fayolle et le Grand Fayolle.

== History ==
In the Middle Ages, the monks of Nanteuil Abbey were lords of individual communes. In 1172, they ceded some of their land to the abbey of Grosbot, to build a church. Towards the middle of the 17th century, the population had increased, and a parish was created. The Saint Bartholomew church, slightly larger, was damaged by the Protestants. It was the subject of renovation in 1888–1889.

== Population ==
Historical population
Year	Pop.	±% p.a.
1968	180	—
1975	182	+0.16%
1982	165	−1.39%
1990	160	−0.38%
1999	166	+0.41%
2007	165	−0.08%
2012	164	−0.12%
2017	178	+1.65%
2023	185	+0.64%
Source: INSEE

== Administration ==
=== Mayors ===
- 1896 -1904 Pierre Bastier
- 1904 -1919 Jean Bastier
- 1919 -1925 Jean Marifat
- 1925 -1944 Jean Mathieu
- 1944 -1960 Louis Ravion
- 1960 -1965 Anselme Migaud
- 1965 -1971 Jean-Louis Delhoume
- 1971 - Pierre Chaussepied

== See also ==
- Communes of the Charente department
