= Vervant =

Vervant may refer to the following places in France:

- Vervant, Charente, a commune in the department of Charente
- Vervant, Charente-Maritime, a commune in the department of Charente-Maritime
