= Saint-Front =

Saint-Front may refer to the following communes in France:

- Saint-Front, Charente, in the Charente department
- Saint-Front, Dordogne, a former commune in the Dordogne department, part of Couze-et-Saint-Front
- Saint-Front, Haute-Loire, in the Haute-Loire department
- Saint-Front-d'Alemps, in the Dordogne department
- Saint-Front-de-Pradoux, in the Dordogne department
- Saint-Front-la-Rivière, in the Dordogne department
- Saint-Front-sur-Lémance, in the Lot-et-Garonne department
- Saint-Front-sur-Nizonne, in the Dordogne department
