= Coulonges =

Coulonges may refer to the following places in France:

- Coulonges, Charente, a commune in the department of Charente
- Coulonges, Charente-Maritime, a commune in the department of Charente-Maritime
- Coulonges, Eure, a former commune in the department of Eure
- Coulonges, Vienne, a commune in the department of Vienne
- Coulonges-Cohan, a commune in the department of Aisne
- Coulonges-les-Sablons, a commune in the department of Orne
- Coulonges-sur-l'Autize, a commune in the department of Deux-Sèvres
- Coulonges-sur-Sarthe, a commune in the department of Orne
- Coulonges-Thouarsais, a commune in the department of Deux-Sèvres
