= Nanclars =

- Commune
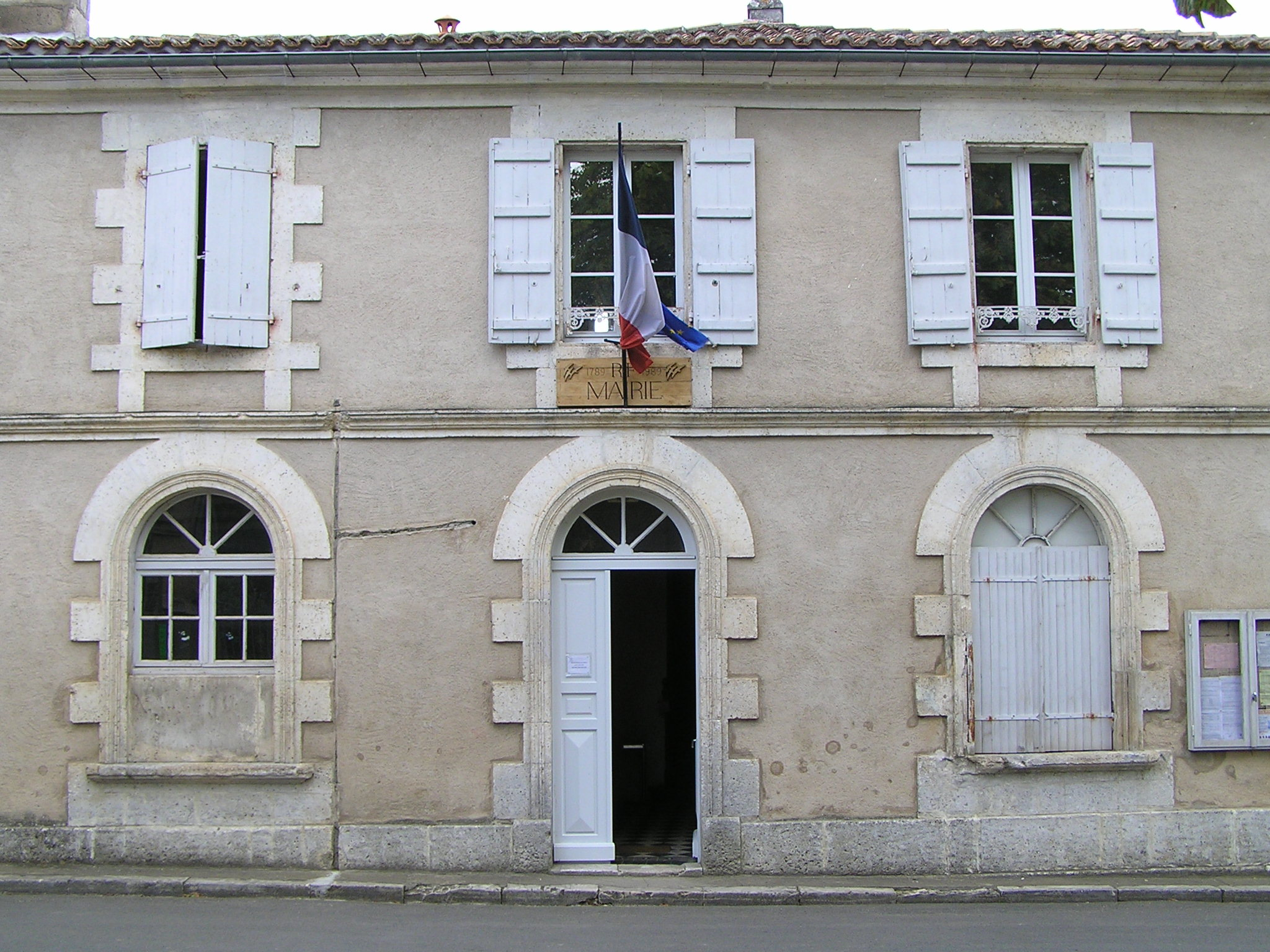
- Town hall
- Location of Nanclars
- Location within France Location within Nouvelle-Aquitaine
- Coordinates: 45°50′43″N 0°13′14″E
- Country: France
- Region: Nouvelle-Aquitaine
- Department: Charente
- Arrondissement: Confolens
- Canton: Boixe-et-Manslois

Government
  - Mayor (2020–2026): Pierre-Hermann Mugnier
- Area^{1}: 5.73 km^{2} (2.21 sq mi)
- Elevation: 100 m (330 ft)
- Highest elevation: 119 m (390 ft)
- Lowest elevation: 65 m (213 ft)
- Population (2023): 211
  - Density: 36.8/km^{2} (95.4/sq mi)
- Time zone: UTC+01:00 (CET)
  - Summer (DST): UTC+02:00 (CEST)
- INSEE/Postal code: 16241 /16230
- ^{1} French Land Register data, which excludes lakes, ponds, glaciers > 1 km^{2} (0.386 sq mi or 247 acres) and river estuaries.

Nanclars (French pronunciation: [nɑ̃klaʁ]) is a commune in the Charente department in southwestern France.

== Population ==
Historical population
Year	Pop.	±% p.a.
1968	204	—
1975	186	−1.31%
1982	194	+0.60%
1990	201	+0.44%
1999	200	−0.06%
2007	206	+0.37%
2012	194	−1.19%
2017	204	+1.01%
2023	211	+0.56%
Source: INSEE

== See also ==
- Communes of the Charente department
