= Mouton, Charente =

Mouton
- Commune
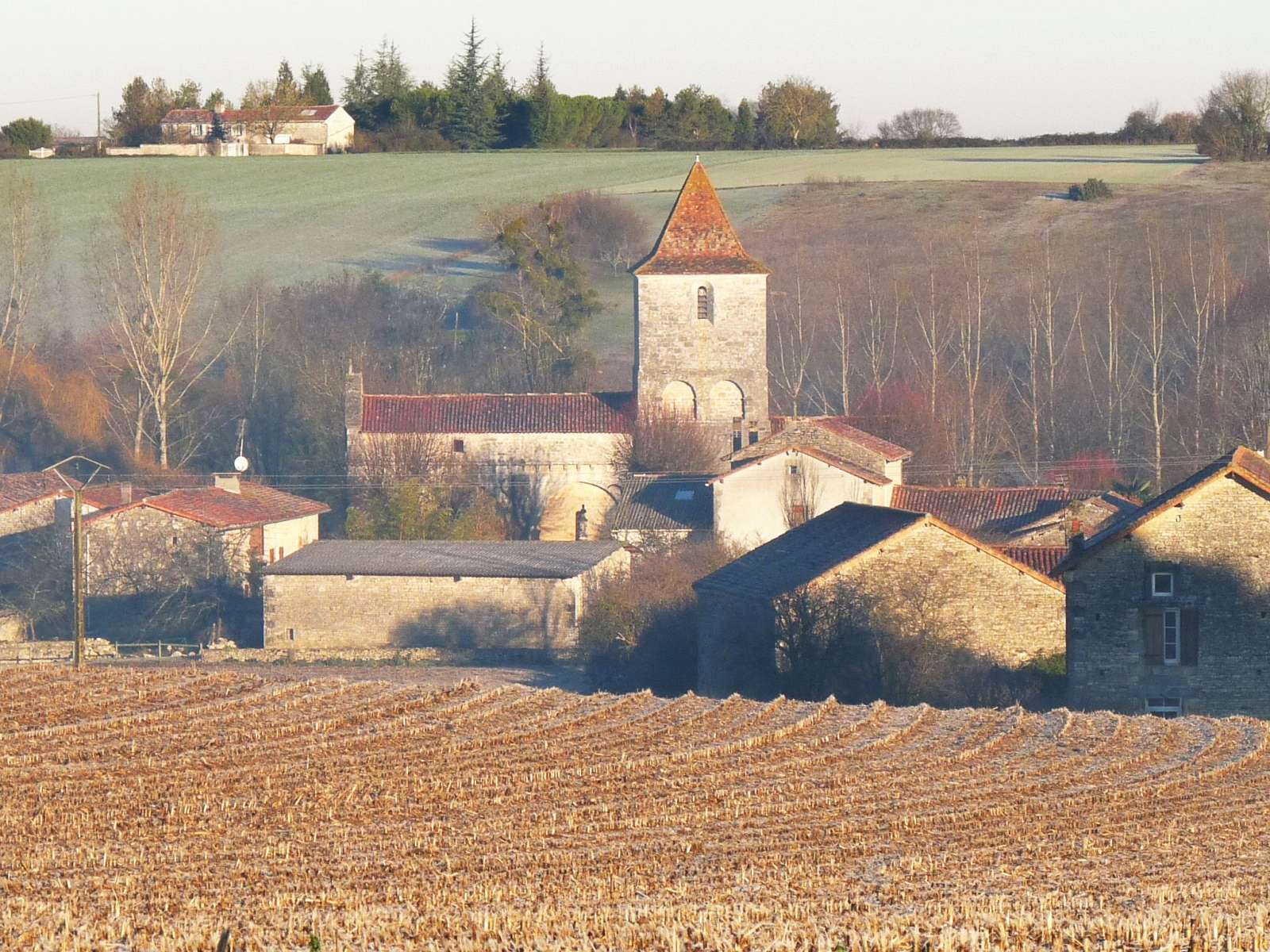
- A general view of Mouton
- Location of Mouton
- Location within France Location within Nouvelle-Aquitaine
- Coordinates: 45°53′32″N 0°14′38″E
- Country: France
- Region: Nouvelle-Aquitaine
- Department: Charente
- Arrondissement: Confolens
- Canton: Boixe-et-Manslois
- Intercommunality: Cœur de Charente

Government
  - Mayor (2020–2026): Francine Pineau
- Area^{1}: 9.08 km^{2} (3.51 sq mi)
- Elevation: 64 m (210 ft)
- Highest elevation: 109 m (358 ft)
- Lowest elevation: 57 m (187 ft)
- Population (2023): 223
  - Density: 24.6/km^{2} (63.6/sq mi)
- Time zone: UTC+01:00 (CET)
  - Summer (DST): UTC+02:00 (CEST)
- INSEE/Postal code: 16237 /16460
- ^{1} French Land Register data, which excludes lakes, ponds, glaciers > 1 km^{2} (0.386 sq mi or 247 acres) and river estuaries.

Mouton (French pronunciation: [mutɔ̃]) is a commune in the Charente department in southwestern France.

== Population ==
Historical population
Year	Pop.	±% p.a.
1968	259	—
1975	235	−1.38%
1982	212	−1.46%
1990	194	−1.10%
1999	223	+1.56%
2007	224	+0.06%
2012	228	+0.35%
2017	224	−0.35%
2023	223	−0.07%
Source: INSEE

== See also ==
- Communes of the Charente department
