= Cellettes, Charente =

Cellettes
- Commune
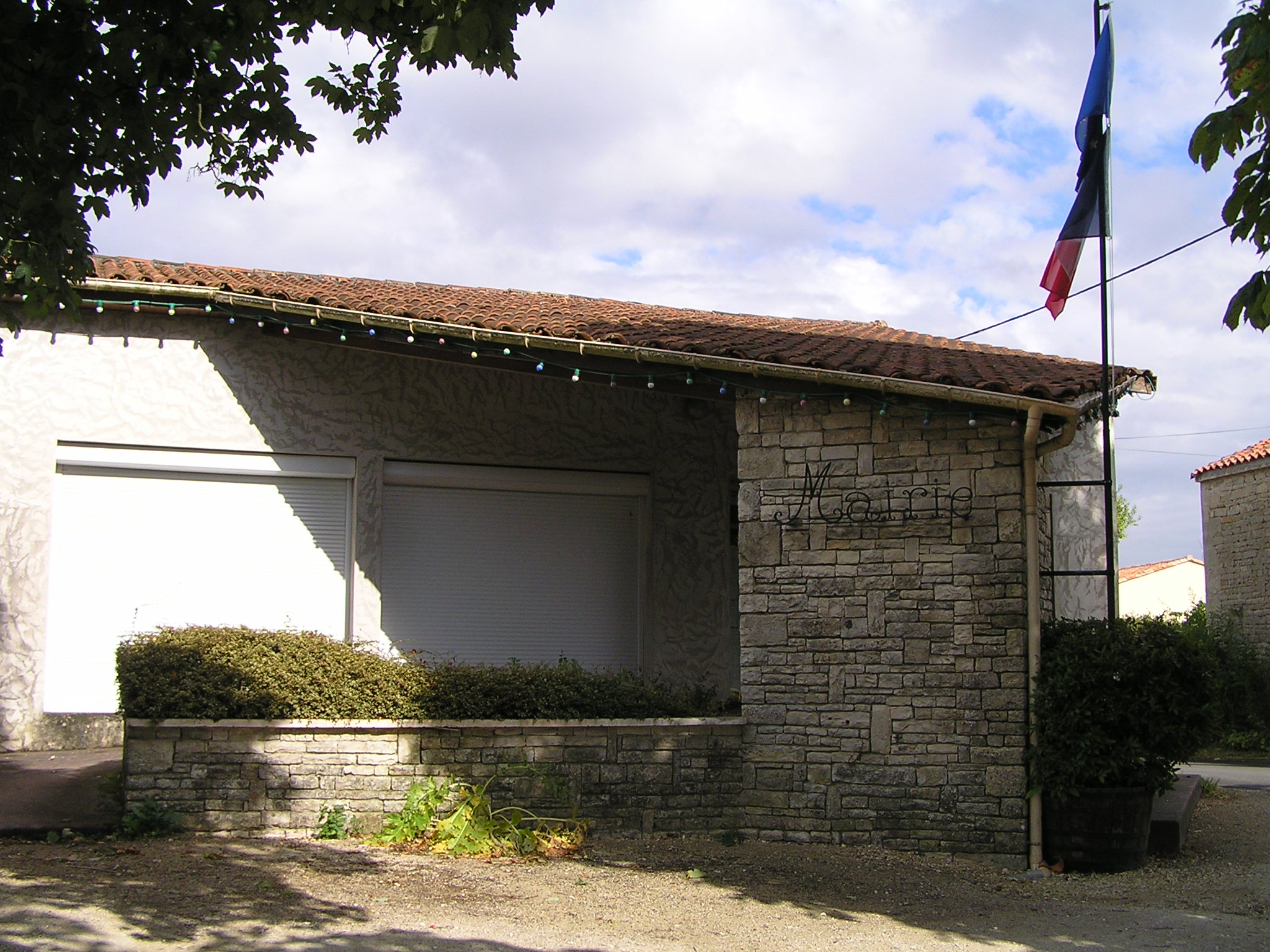
- Town hall
- Location of Cellettes
- Location within France Location within Nouvelle-Aquitaine
- Coordinates: 45°51′52″N 0°08′54″E
- Country: France
- Region: Nouvelle-Aquitaine
- Department: Charente
- Arrondissement: Confolens
- Canton: Boixe-et-Manslois
- Intercommunality: Cœur de Charente

Government
  - Mayor (2020–2026): Norbert Aguesseau
- Area^{1}: 9.37 km^{2} (3.62 sq mi)
- Elevation: 105 m (344 ft)
- Highest elevation: 117 m (384 ft)
- Lowest elevation: 52 m (171 ft)
- Population (2023): 393
  - Density: 41.9/km^{2} (109/sq mi)
- Time zone: UTC+01:00 (CET)
  - Summer (DST): UTC+02:00 (CEST)
- INSEE/Postal code: 16069 /16230
- ^{1} French Land Register data, which excludes lakes, ponds, glaciers > 1 km^{2} (0.386 sq mi or 247 acres) and river estuaries.

Cellettes (French pronunciation: [selɛt]) is a commune in the Charente department, Southwestern France.

== Population ==
Historical population
Year	Pop.	±% p.a.
1968	259	—
1975	222	−2.18%
1982	294	+4.09%
1990	346	+2.06%
1999	415	+2.04%
2007	444	+0.85%
2012	435	−0.41%
2017	402	−1.57%
2023	393	−0.38%
Source: INSEE

== Gallery ==
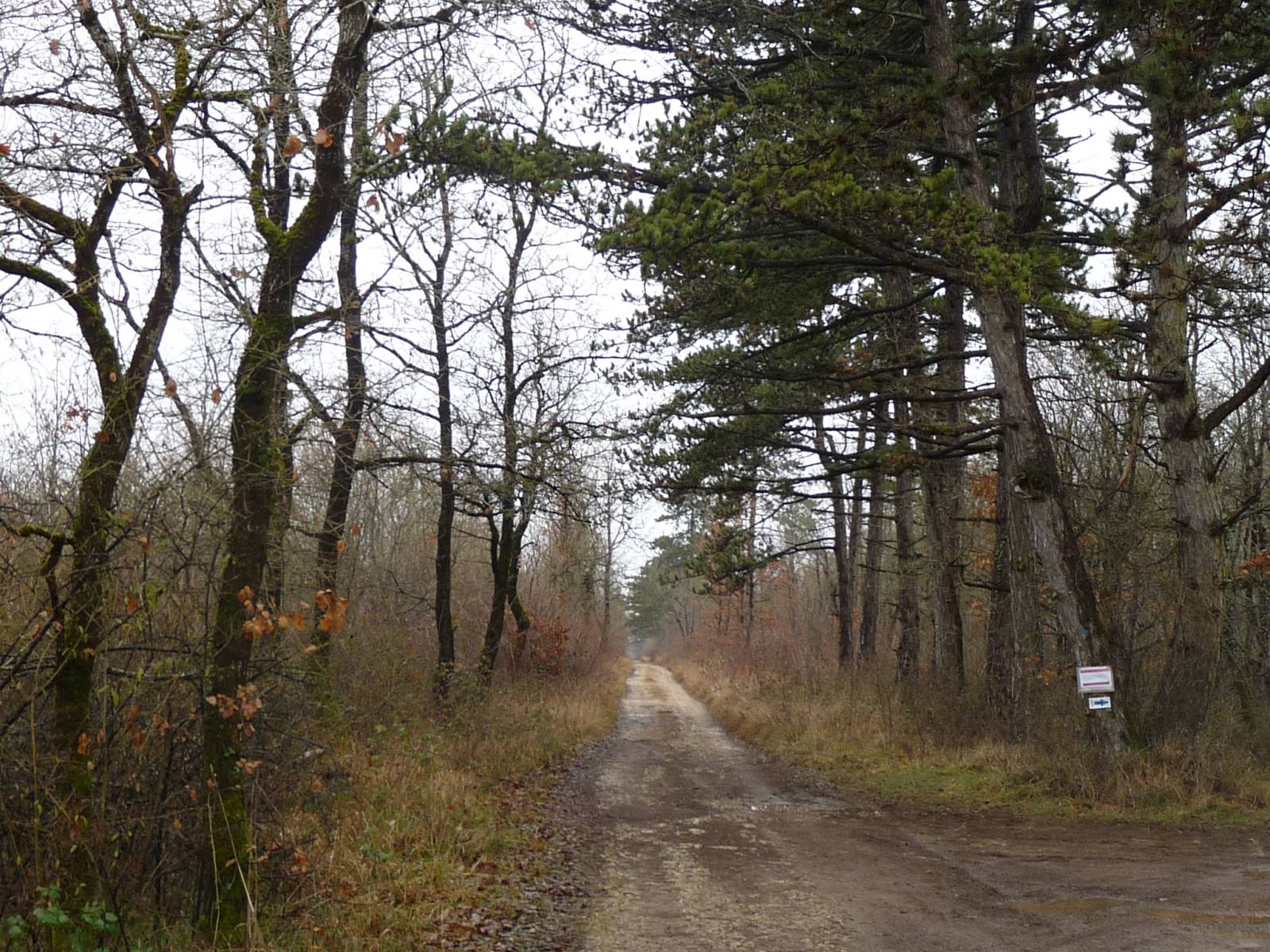
Forêt de Boixe in winter

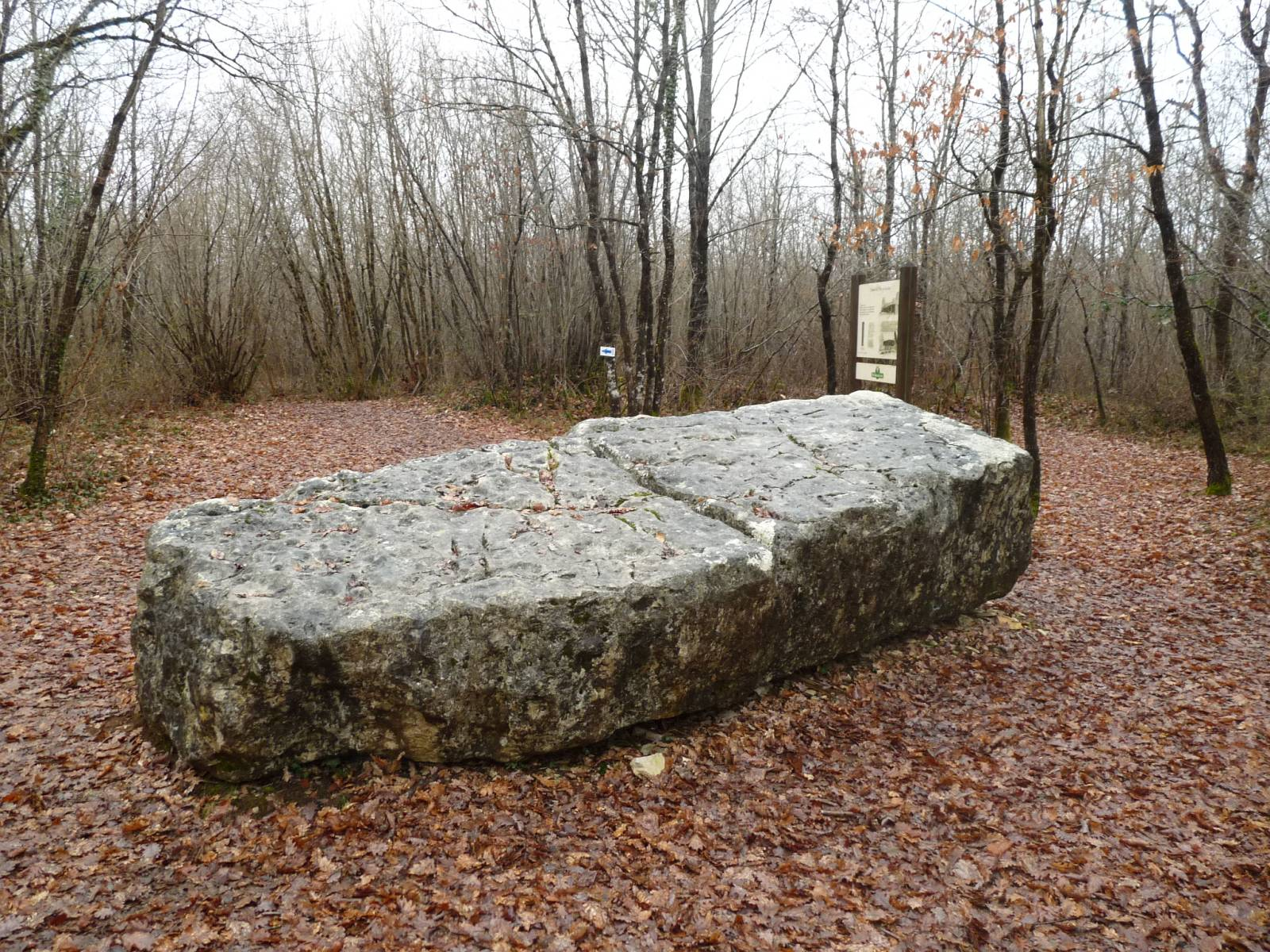
Dolmen also wrongly said as a "sacrifice table", is located in the Forêt de Boixe

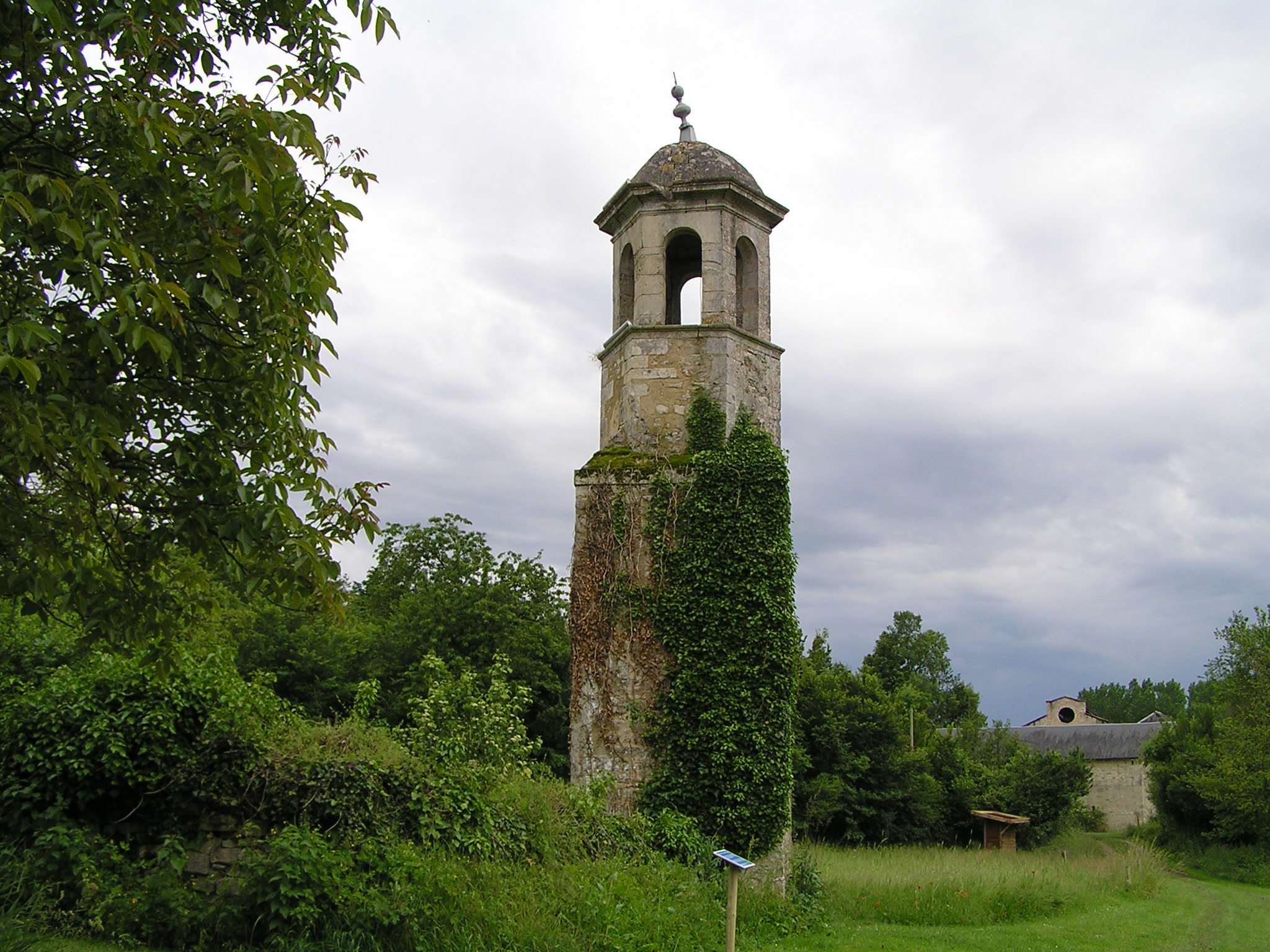
Chapel of the Château d'Échoisy

== See also ==
- Communes of the Charente department
