= La Tâche =

- Commune
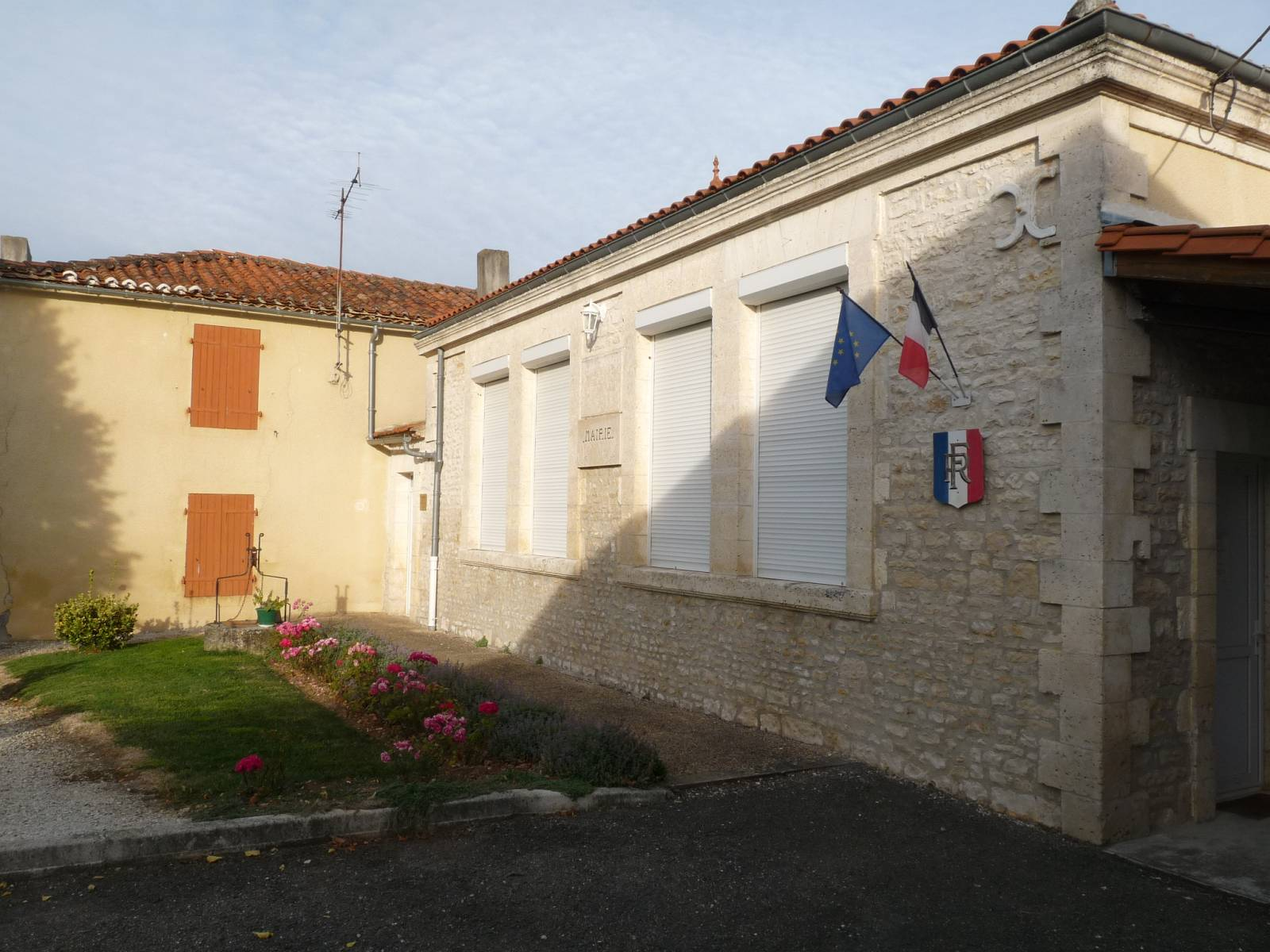
- Town hall
- Location of La Tâche
- Location within France Location within Nouvelle-Aquitaine
- Coordinates: 45°52′07″N 0°21′21″E
- Country: France
- Region: Nouvelle-Aquitaine
- Department: Charente
- Arrondissement: Confolens
- Canton: Boixe-et-Manslois

Government
  - Mayor (2020–2026): Michelle Dheilly
- Area^{1}: 7.30 km^{2} (2.82 sq mi)
- Elevation: 144 m (472 ft)
- Highest elevation: 183 m (600 ft)
- Lowest elevation: 88 m (289 ft)
- Population (2023): 105
  - Density: 14.4/km^{2} (37.3/sq mi)
- Time zone: UTC+01:00 (CET)
  - Summer (DST): UTC+02:00 (CEST)
- INSEE/Postal code: 16377 /16260
- ^{1} French Land Register data, which excludes lakes, ponds, glaciers > 1 km^{2} (0.386 sq mi or 247 acres) and river estuaries.

La Tâche (French pronunciation: [la taʃ]) is a commune in the Charente department in southwestern France.

== Population ==
Historical population
Year	Pop.	±% p.a.
1968	104	—
1975	99	−0.70%
1982	83	−2.49%
1990	103	+2.74%
1999	95	−0.89%
2007	107	+1.50%
2012	103	−0.76%
2017	115	+2.23%
2023	105	−1.50%
Source: INSEE

== See also ==
- Communes of the Charente department
