= Maine-de-Boixe =

- Commune
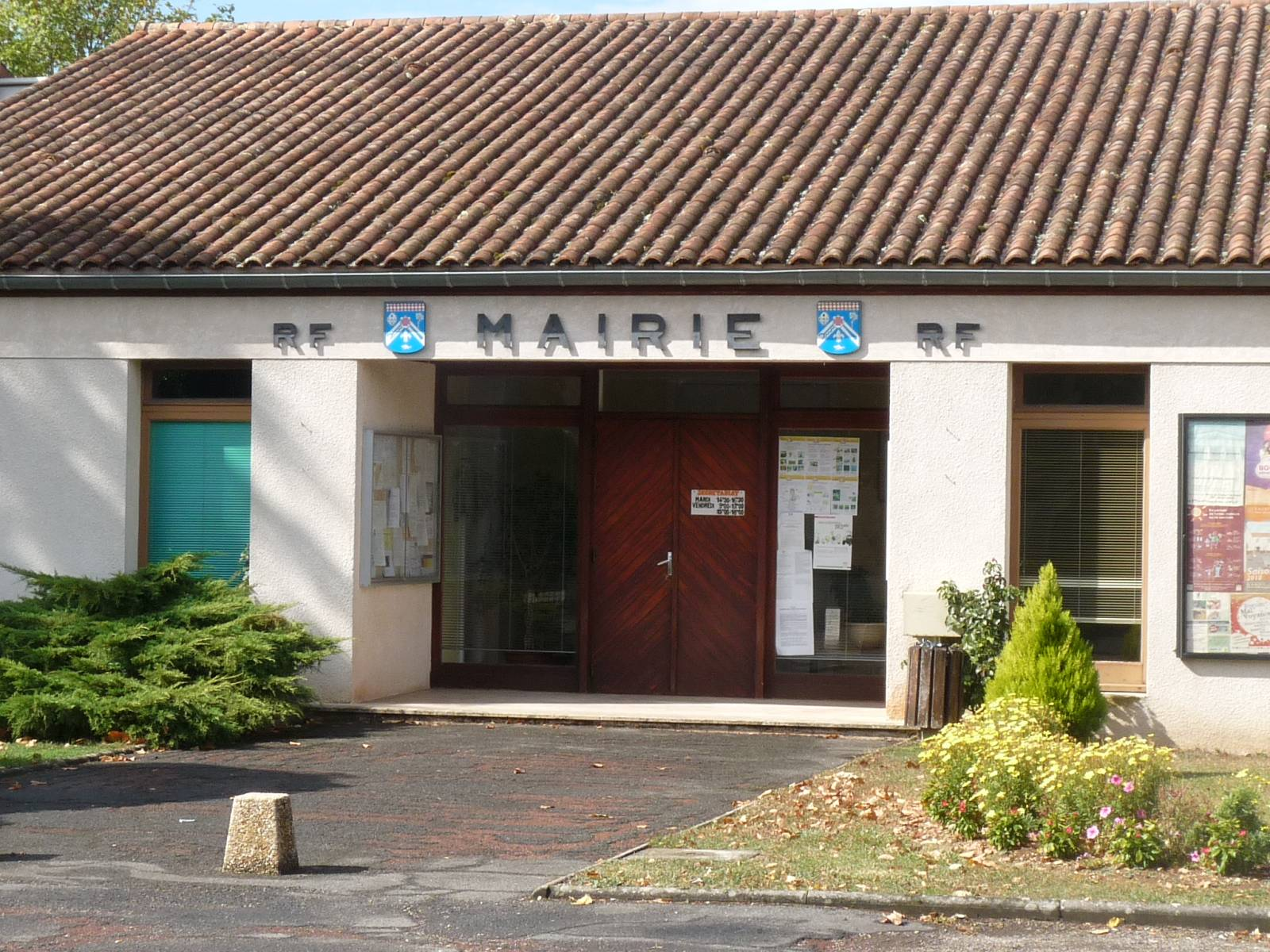
- Town hall

- Coat of arms
- Location of Maine-de-Boixe
- Location within France Location within Nouvelle-Aquitaine
- Coordinates: 45°51′03″N 0°10′37″E
- Country: France
- Region: Nouvelle-Aquitaine
- Department: Charente
- Arrondissement: Confolens
- Canton: Boixe-et-Manslois

Government
  - Mayor (2020–2026): Sonia Papillaud
- Area^{1}: 9.35 km^{2} (3.61 sq mi)
- Elevation: 109 m (358 ft)
- Highest elevation: 121 m (397 ft)
- Lowest elevation: 78 m (256 ft)
- Population (2023): 473
  - Density: 50.6/km^{2} (131/sq mi)
- Time zone: UTC+01:00 (CET)
  - Summer (DST): UTC+02:00 (CEST)
- INSEE/Postal code: 16200 /16230
- ^{1} French Land Register data, which excludes lakes, ponds, glaciers > 1 km^{2} (0.386 sq mi or 247 acres) and river estuaries.

Maine-de-Boixe (French pronunciation: [mɛn də bwaks]) is a commune in the Charente department in the administrative region of Nouvelle-Aquitaine, France.

== Population ==
Historical population
Year	Pop.	±% p.a.
1968	167	—
1975	206	+3.04%
1982	296	+5.31%
1990	375	+3.00%
1999	384	+0.26%
2007	441	+1.75%
2012	472	+1.37%
2017	484	+0.50%
2023	473	−0.38%
Source: INSEE

== See also ==
- Communes of the Charente department
