= La Chapelle, Charente =

La Chapelle
- Commune
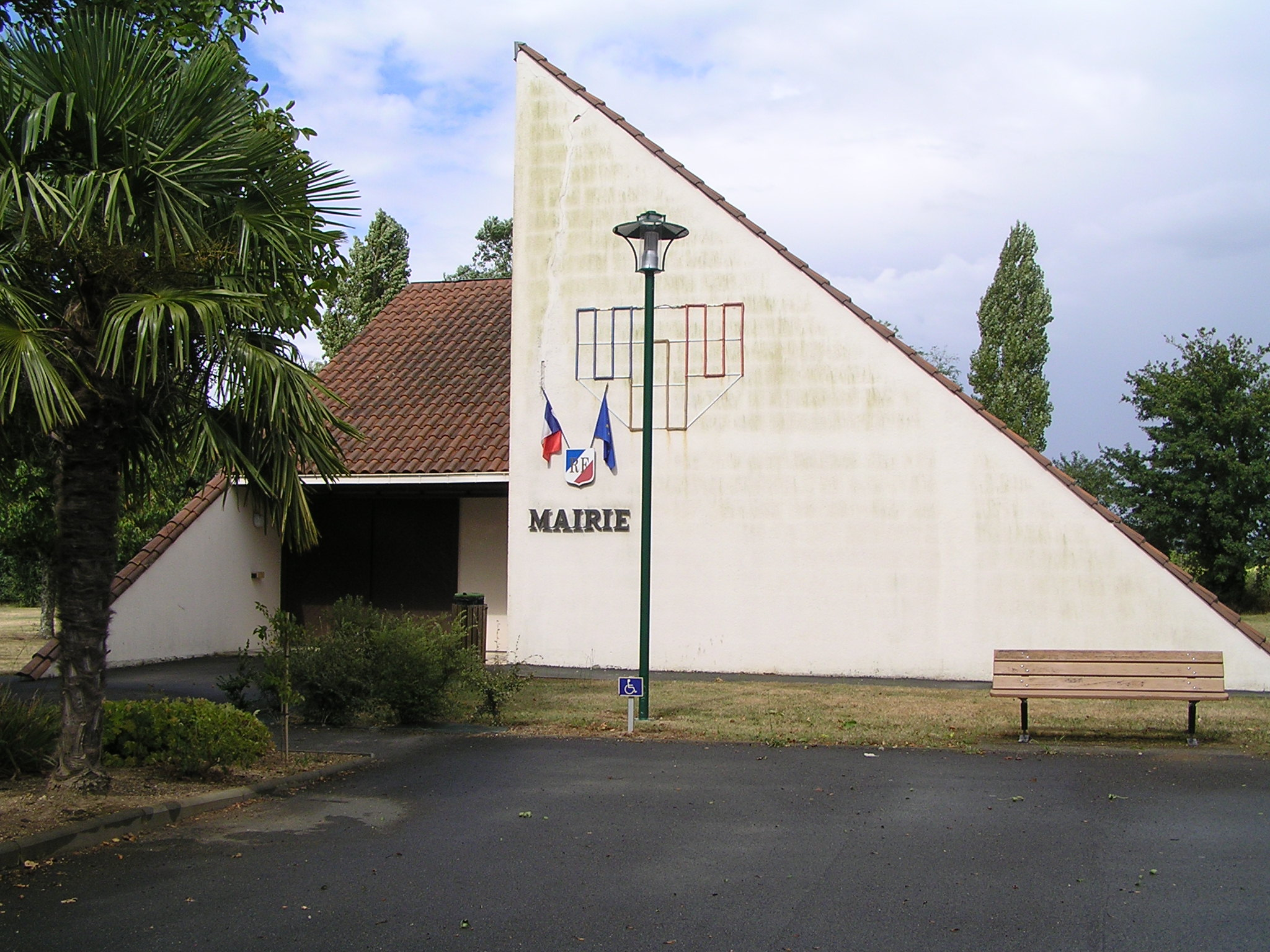
- Town hall
- Location of La Chapelle
- Location within France Location within Nouvelle-Aquitaine
- Coordinates: 45°50′26″N 0°02′17″E
- Country: France
- Region: Nouvelle-Aquitaine
- Department: Charente
- Arrondissement: Confolens
- Canton: Boixe-et-Manslois

Government
  - Mayor (2020–2026): Catherine Cecchin
- Area^{1}: 7.69 km^{2} (2.97 sq mi)
- Elevation: 65 m (213 ft)
- Highest elevation: 111 m (364 ft)
- Lowest elevation: 45 m (148 ft)
- Population (2023): 175
  - Density: 22.8/km^{2} (58.9/sq mi)
- Time zone: UTC+01:00 (CET)
  - Summer (DST): UTC+02:00 (CEST)
- INSEE/Postal code: 16081 /16140
- ^{1} French Land Register data, which excludes lakes, ponds, glaciers > 1 km^{2} (0.386 sq mi or 247 acres) and river estuaries.

La Chapelle (French pronunciation: [la ʃapɛl]; lit. 'The Chapel') is a rural commune in the Charente department in southwestern France.

== Population ==
Historical population
Year	Pop.	±% p.a.
1968	137	—
1975	140	+0.31%
1982	150	+0.99%
1990	148	−0.17%
1999	151	+0.22%
2007	185	+2.57%
2012	214	+2.96%
2017	214	+0.00%
2023	175	−3.30%
Source: INSEE

== See also ==
- Communes of the Charente department
