= Canton of Boixe-et-Manslois =

Coordinates: 45.76°N 0.12°E

- Canton
- Situation of the canton of Boixe-et-Manslois in the department of Charente
- Country: France
- Region: Nouvelle-Aquitaine
- Department: Charente
- No. of communes: {{{nbcomm}}}
- Population (2023): 17,613
- INSEE code: 1605

The canton of Boixe-et-Manslois is an administrative division of the Charente department, southwestern France. It was created at the French canton reorganisation which came into effect in March 2015. Its seat is in La Boixe.

It consists of the following communes:

1. Ambérac
2. Anais
3. Aunac-sur-Charente
4. Aussac-Vadalle
5. La Boixe
6. Cellefrouin
7. Cellettes
8. La Chapelle
9. Chenon
10. Coulonges
11. Fontenille
12. Juillé
13. Lichères
14. Lonnes
15. Luxé
16. Maine-de-Boixe
17. Mansle-les-Fontaines
18. Mouton
19. Nanclars
20. Puyréaux
21. Saint-Amant-de-Boixe
22. Saint-Ciers-sur-Bonnieure
23. Saint-Front
24. Saint-Groux
25. La Tâche
26. Tourriers
27. Val-de-Bonnieure
28. Valence
29. Ventouse
30. Vervant
31. Villejoubert
32. Villognon
33. Vouharte
34. Xambes
