= Valence, Charente =

Valence
- Commune
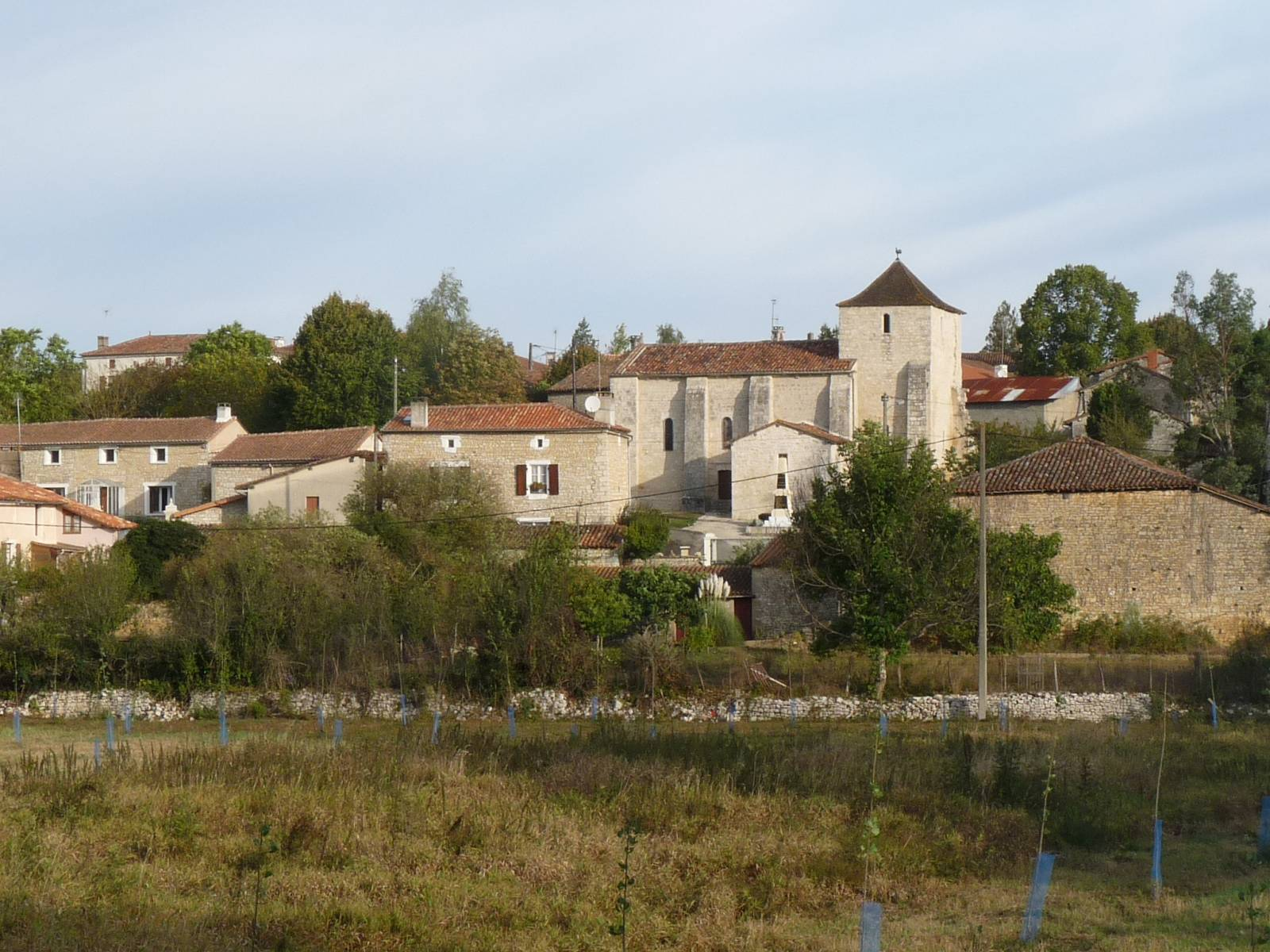
- A general view of Valence
- Location of Valence
- Location within France Location within Nouvelle-Aquitaine
- Coordinates: 45°53′26″N 0°18′29″E
- Country: France
- Region: Nouvelle-Aquitaine
- Department: Charente
- Arrondissement: Confolens
- Canton: Boixe-et-Manslois
- Intercommunality: Cœur de Charente

Government
  - Mayor (2020–2026): Christine Soury
- Area^{1}: 10.87 km^{2} (4.20 sq mi)
- Elevation: 110 m (360 ft)
- Highest elevation: 143 m (469 ft)
- Lowest elevation: 72 m (236 ft)
- Population (2023): 192
  - Density: 17.7/km^{2} (45.7/sq mi)
- Time zone: UTC+01:00 (CET)
  - Summer (DST): UTC+02:00 (CEST)
- INSEE/Postal code: 16392 /16460
- ^{1} French Land Register data, which excludes lakes, ponds, glaciers > 1 km^{2} (0.386 sq mi or 247 acres) and river estuaries.

Valence (French pronunciation: [valɑ̃s]; Occitan: Valença) is a commune in the Charente department in southwestern France. It was not the birthplace of William de Valence, who later became Earl of Pembroke. He was born in the Cistercian abbey in Valence, Couhé-Vérac (Vienne department), near Lusignan.

== Population ==
Historical population
Year	Pop.	±% p.a.
1968	242	—
1975	256	+0.81%
1982	265	+0.49%
1990	212	−2.75%
1999	240	+1.39%
2007	233	−0.37%
2012	227	−0.52%
2017	197	−2.80%
2023	192	−0.43%
Source: INSEE

== See also ==
- Communes of the Charente department
