= Ventouse, Charente =

Ventouse
- Commune
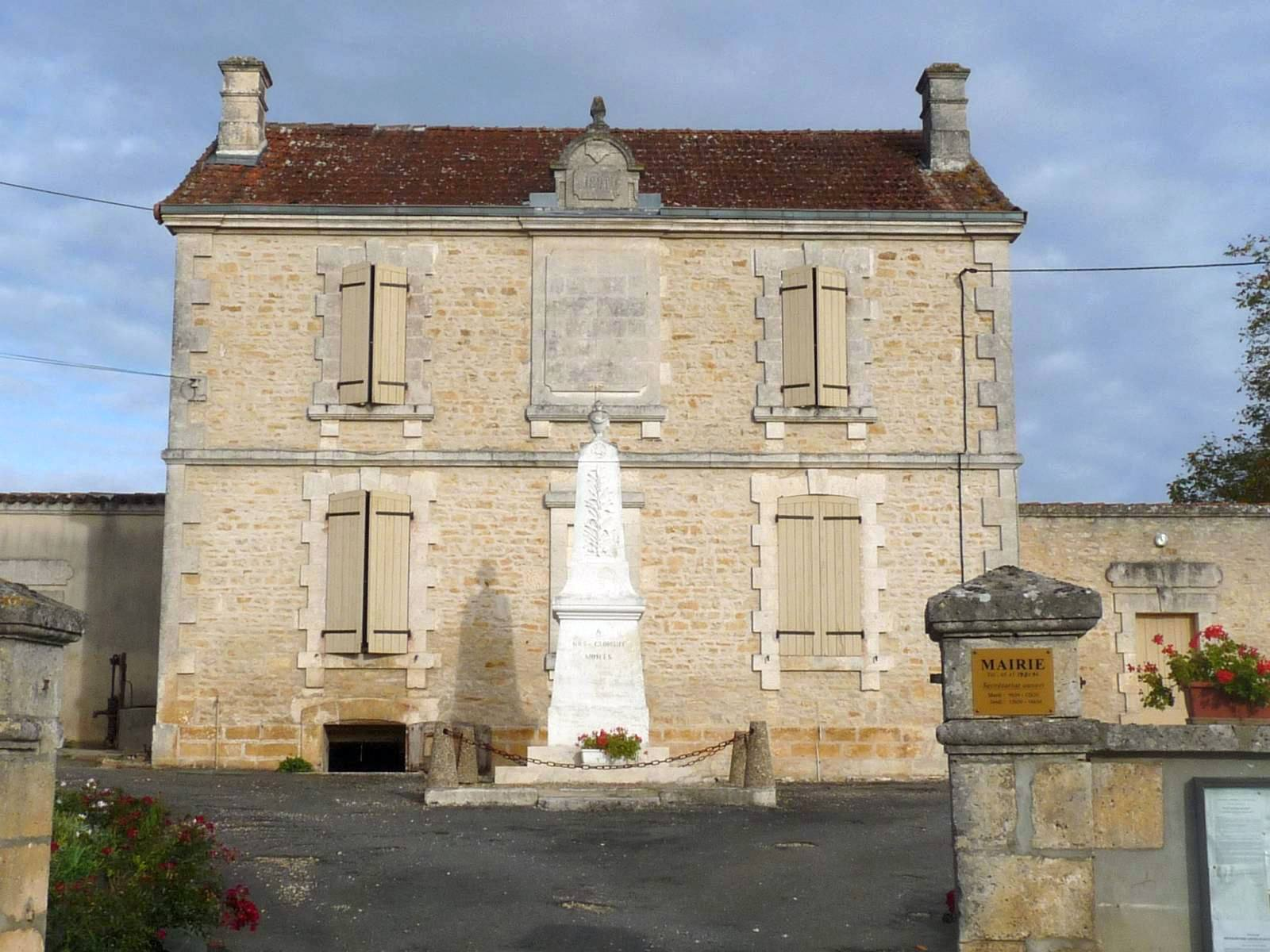
- Town hall
- Location of Ventouse
- Location within France Location within Nouvelle-Aquitaine
- Coordinates: 45°54′15″N 0°19′35″E
- Country: France
- Region: Nouvelle-Aquitaine
- Department: Charente
- Arrondissement: Confolens
- Canton: Boixe-et-Manslois

Government
  - Mayor (2024–2026): Romain Pintureau
- Area^{1}: 10.15 km^{2} (3.92 sq mi)
- Elevation: 112 m (367 ft)
- Highest elevation: 162 m (531 ft)
- Lowest elevation: 75 m (246 ft)
- Population (2023): 122
  - Density: 12.0/km^{2} (31.1/sq mi)
- Time zone: UTC+01:00 (CET)
  - Summer (DST): UTC+02:00 (CEST)
- INSEE/Postal code: 16396 /16460
- ^{1} French Land Register data, which excludes lakes, ponds, glaciers > 1 km^{2} (0.386 sq mi or 247 acres) and river estuaries.

Ventouse (French pronunciation: [vɑ̃tuz]) is a commune in the Charente department in southwestern France.

== Population ==
Historical population
Year	Pop.	±% p.a.
1968	166	—
1975	151	−1.34%
1982	136	−1.48%
1990	124	−1.15%
1999	113	−1.03%
2007	123	+1.07%
2012	128	+0.80%
2017	126	−0.31%
2023	122	−0.54%
Source: INSEE

== See also ==
- Communes of the Charente department
