= Saint-Groux =

- Commune
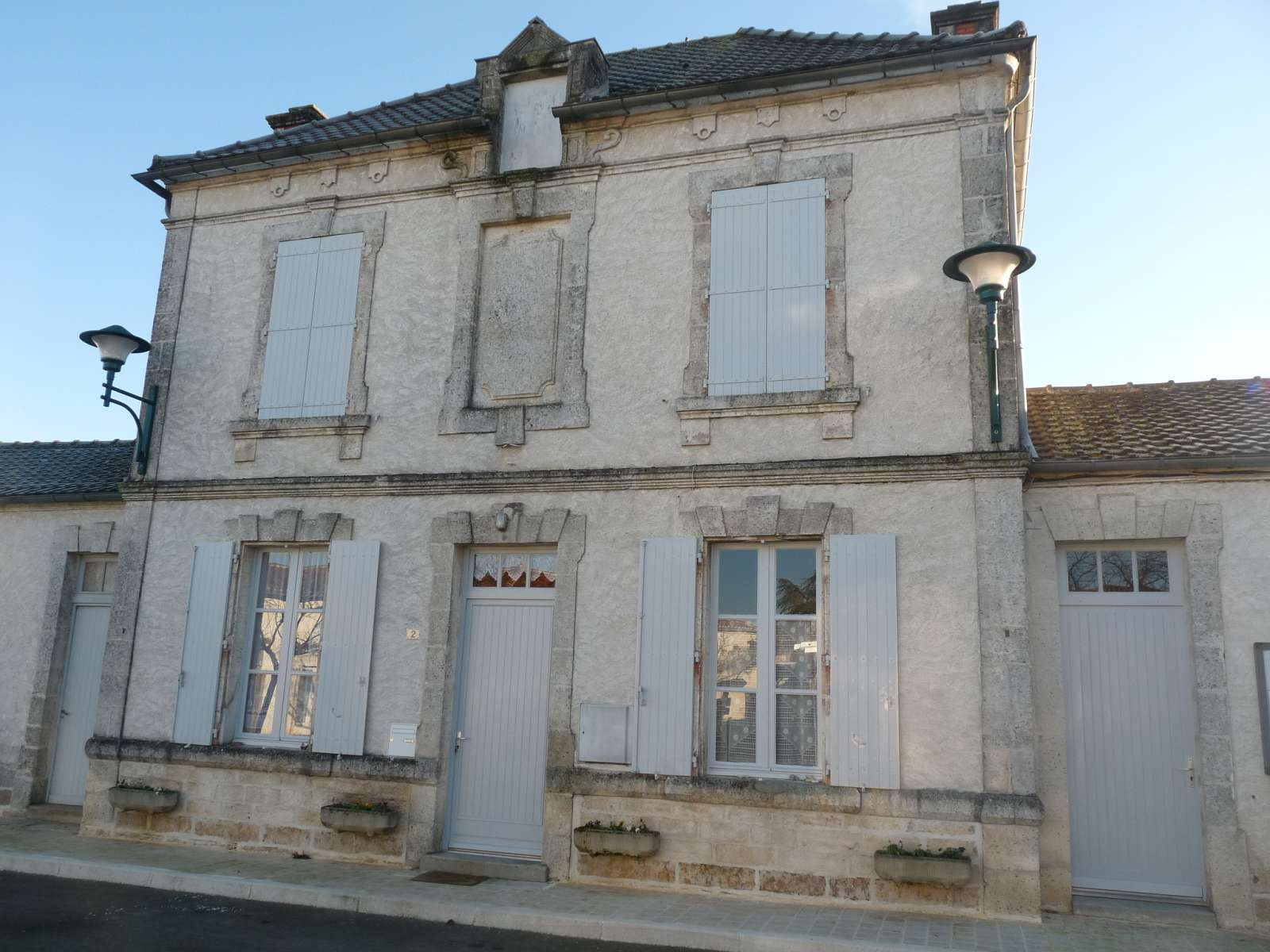
- Town hall
- Location of Saint-Groux
- Location within France Location within Nouvelle-Aquitaine
- Coordinates: 45°53′52″N 0°10′07″E
- Country: France
- Region: Nouvelle-Aquitaine
- Department: Charente
- Arrondissement: Confolens
- Canton: Boixe-et-Manslois

Government
  - Mayor (2020–2026): Sigrid Faure
- Area^{1}: 4.50 km^{2} (1.74 sq mi)
- Elevation: 61 m (200 ft)
- Highest elevation: 90 m (300 ft)
- Lowest elevation: 52 m (171 ft)
- Population (2023): 136
  - Density: 30.2/km^{2} (78.3/sq mi)
- Time zone: UTC+01:00 (CET)
  - Summer (DST): UTC+02:00 (CEST)
- INSEE/Postal code: 16326 /16230
- ^{1} French Land Register data, which excludes lakes, ponds, glaciers > 1 km^{2} (0.386 sq mi or 247 acres) and river estuaries.

Saint-Groux (French pronunciation: [sɛ̃ ɡʁu]) is a commune in the Charente department in southwestern France.

== Population ==
Historical population
Year	Pop.	±% p.a.
1968	84	—
1975	91	+1.15%
1982	94	+0.46%
1990	114	+2.44%
1999	122	+0.76%
2007	134	+1.18%
2012	139	+0.74%
2017	137	−0.29%
2023	136	−0.12%
Source: INSEE

== See also ==
- Communes of the Charente department
