= Villognon =

- Commune
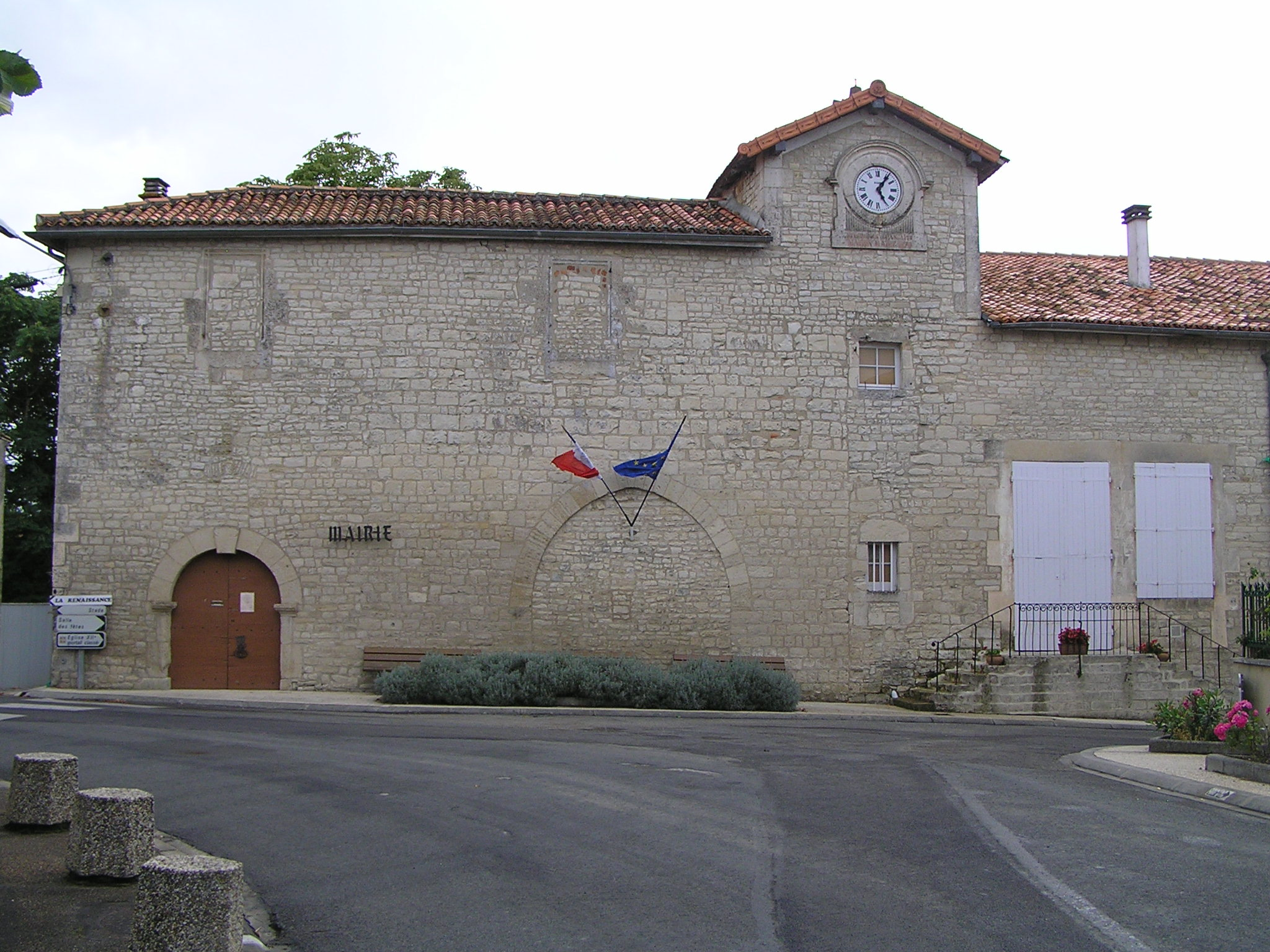
- Town hall
- Location of Villognon
- Location within France Location within Nouvelle-Aquitaine
- Coordinates: 45°51′46″N 0°05′59″E
- Country: France
- Region: Nouvelle-Aquitaine
- Department: Charente
- Arrondissement: Confolens
- Canton: Boixe-et-Manslois
- Intercommunality: Cœur de Charente

Government
  - Mayor (2020–2026): Philippe Goyaud
- Area^{1}: 9.17 km^{2} (3.54 sq mi)
- Elevation: 69 m (226 ft)
- Highest elevation: 107 m (351 ft)
- Lowest elevation: 50 m (160 ft)
- Population (2023): 336
  - Density: 36.6/km^{2} (94.9/sq mi)
- Time zone: UTC+01:00 (CET)
  - Summer (DST): UTC+02:00 (CEST)
- INSEE/Postal code: 16414 /16230
- ^{1} French Land Register data, which excludes lakes, ponds, glaciers > 1 km^{2} (0.386 sq mi or 247 acres) and river estuaries.

Villognon (French pronunciation: [vilɔɲɔ̃]) is a commune in the Charente department in southwestern France.

== Population ==
Historical population
Year	Pop.	±% p.a.
1968	510	—
1975	476	−0.98%
1982	444	−0.99%
1990	400	−1.30%
1999	389	−0.31%
2007	392	+0.10%
2012	357	−1.85%
2017	321	−2.10%
2023	336	+0.76%
Source: INSEE

== See also ==
- Communes of the Charente department
