= Xambes =

- Commune
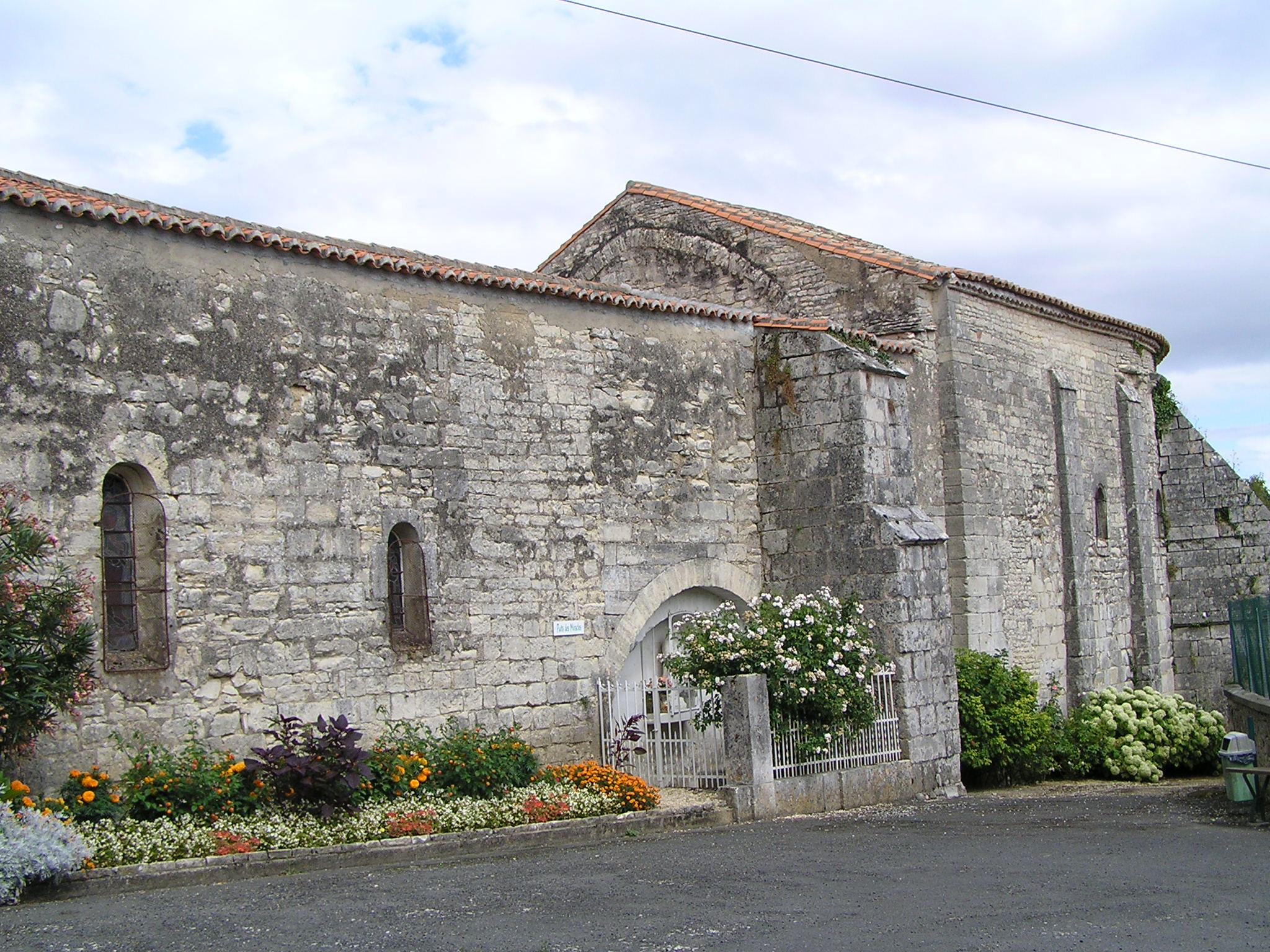
- Notre-Dame church
- Location of Xambes
- Location within France Location within Nouvelle-Aquitaine
- Coordinates: 45°49′38″N 0°06′20″E
- Country: France
- Region: Nouvelle-Aquitaine
- Department: Charente
- Arrondissement: Angoulême
- Canton: Boixe-et-Manslois
- Intercommunality: Cœur de Charente

Government
  - Mayor (2020–2026): Géraldine Jerome
- Area^{1}: 5.25 km^{2} (2.03 sq mi)
- Elevation: 80 m (260 ft)
- Highest elevation: 133 m (436 ft)
- Lowest elevation: 65 m (213 ft)
- Population (2023): 257
  - Density: 49.0/km^{2} (127/sq mi)
- Time zone: UTC+01:00 (CET)
  - Summer (DST): UTC+02:00 (CEST)
- INSEE/Postal code: 16423 /16330
- ^{1} French Land Register data, which excludes lakes, ponds, glaciers > 1 km^{2} (0.386 sq mi or 247 acres) and river estuaries.

Xambes is a commune in the Charente department in southwestern France.

== Population ==
Historical population
Year	Pop.	±% p.a.
1968	300	—
1975	284	−0.78%
1982	297	+0.64%
1990	320	+0.94%
1999	320	+0.00%
2007	307	−0.52%
2012	299	−0.53%
2017	293	−0.40%
2023	257	−2.16%
Source: INSEE

== See also ==
- Communes of the Charente department
