= Vouharte =

- Commune
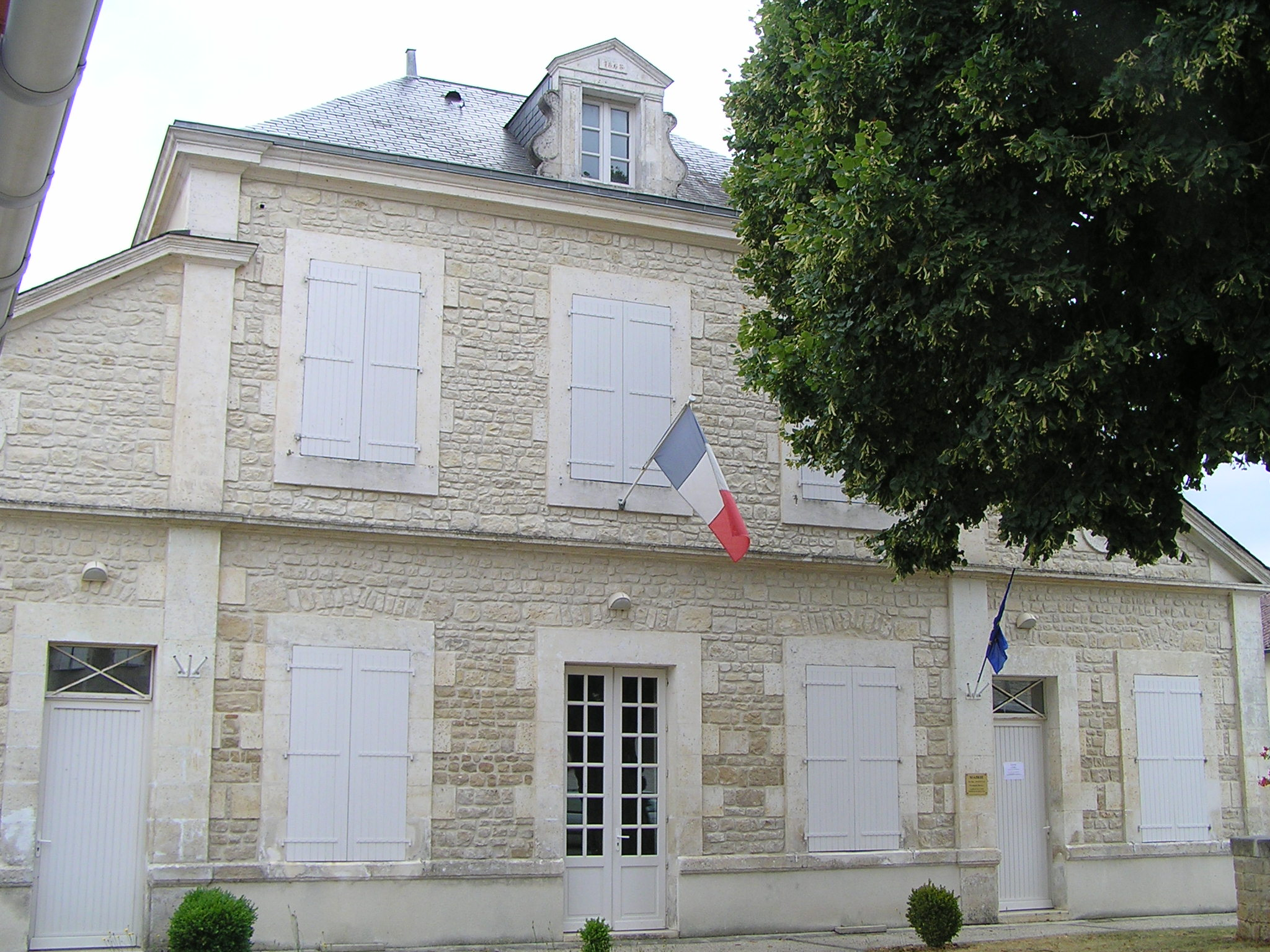
- Town hall
- Location of Vouharte
- Location within France Location within Nouvelle-Aquitaine
- Coordinates: 45°48′59″N 0°04′31″E
- Country: France
- Region: Nouvelle-Aquitaine
- Department: Charente
- Arrondissement: Confolens
- Canton: Boixe-et-Manslois
- Intercommunality: Cœur de Charente

Government
  - Mayor (2022–2026): Patrick Michonneau
- Area^{1}: 10.64 km^{2} (4.11 sq mi)
- Elevation: 45 m (148 ft)
- Highest elevation: 137 m (449 ft)
- Lowest elevation: 42 m (138 ft)
- Population (2023): 300
  - Density: 28/km^{2} (73/sq mi)
- Time zone: UTC+01:00 (CET)
  - Summer (DST): UTC+02:00 (CEST)
- INSEE/Postal code: 16419 /16330
- ^{1} French Land Register data, which excludes lakes, ponds, glaciers > 1 km^{2} (0.386 sq mi or 247 acres) and river estuaries.

Vouharte (French pronunciation: [vu.aʁt]) is a commune in the Charente department in southwestern France.

== Population ==
Historical population
Year	Pop.	±% p.a.
1968	280	—
1975	313	+1.60%
1982	340	+1.19%
1990	339	−0.04%
1999	330	−0.30%
2007	328	−0.08%
2012	328	+0.00%
2017	329	+0.06%
2023	300	−1.53%
Source: INSEE

== See also ==
- Communes of the Charente department
