= Lichères =

- Commune
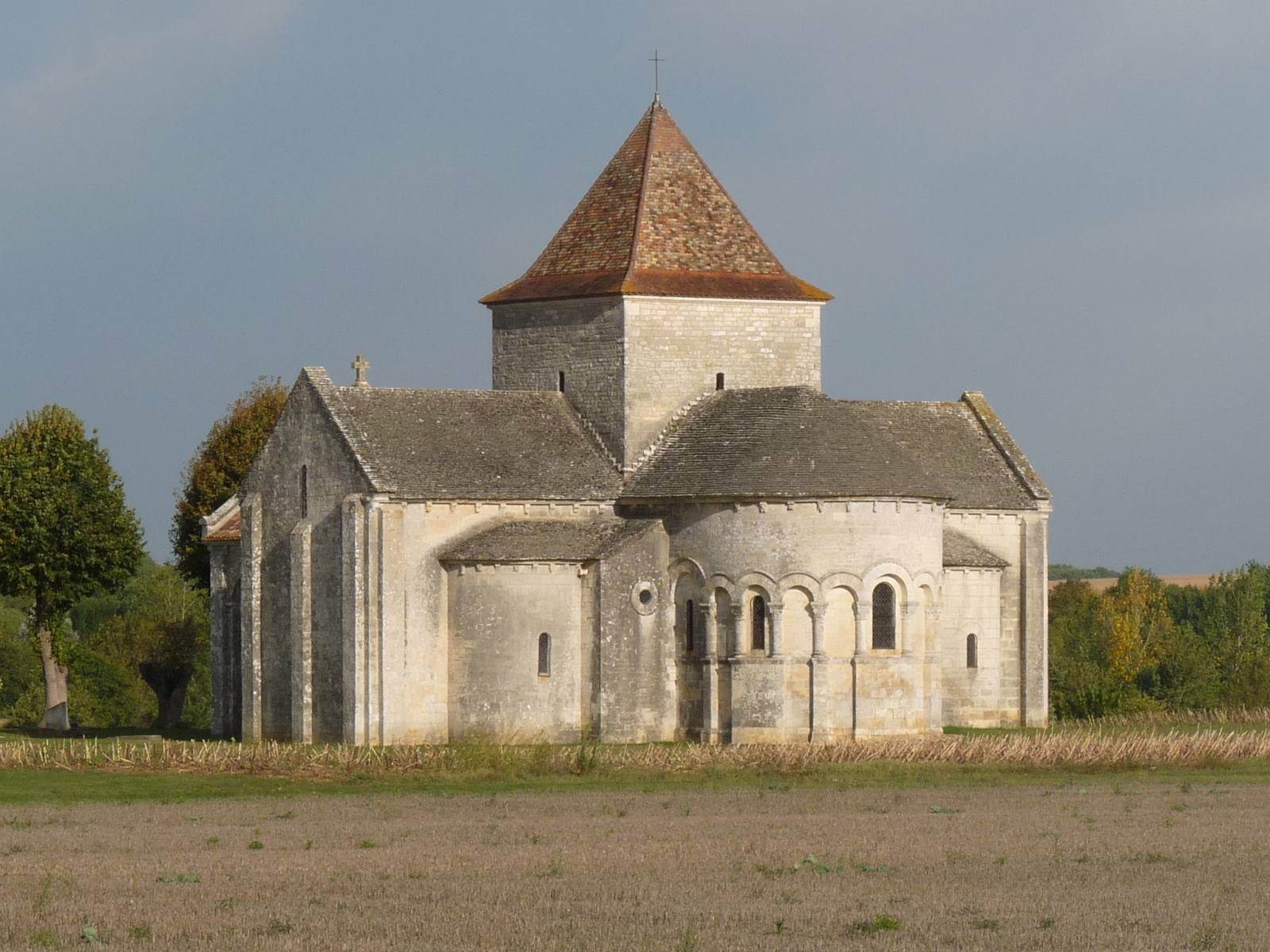
- The church in Lichères
- Location of Lichères
- Location within France Location within Nouvelle-Aquitaine
- Coordinates: 45°53′52″N 0°13′26″E
- Country: France
- Region: Nouvelle-Aquitaine
- Department: Charente
- Arrondissement: Confolens
- Canton: Boixe-et-Manslois

Government
  - Mayor (2020–2026): Jean-Jacques Crine
- Area^{1}: 4.94 km^{2} (1.91 sq mi)
- Elevation: 93 m (305 ft)
- Highest elevation: 117 m (384 ft)
- Lowest elevation: 60 m (200 ft)
- Population (2023): 99
  - Density: 20/km^{2} (52/sq mi)
- Time zone: UTC+01:00 (CET)
  - Summer (DST): UTC+02:00 (CEST)
- INSEE/Postal code: 16184 /16460
- ^{1} French Land Register data, which excludes lakes, ponds, glaciers > 1 km^{2} (0.386 sq mi or 247 acres) and river estuaries.

Lichères (French pronunciation: [liʃɛʁ]) is a commune in the Charente department in southwestern France. It straddles the river Charente comprising the villages of Lichéres, La Salle and Puychenin. The village of Lichéres is home to a 12th-century Catholic church dedicated to Saint Denis. Saint Denis of Lichéres has been considered a Monument historique since 1903. Although there is a conventional road bridge across the river Charente near La Salle, there is also a very small ferry called a Barque. The Barque is guided by a steel wire with which users propel the boat.

== Population ==
Historical population
Year	Pop.	±% p.a.
1968	84	—
1975	70	−2.57%
1982	87	+3.15%
1990	86	−0.14%
1999	94	+0.99%
2007	87	−0.96%
2012	92	+1.12%
2017	87	−1.11%
2023	99	+2.18%
Source: INSEE

== Gallery ==
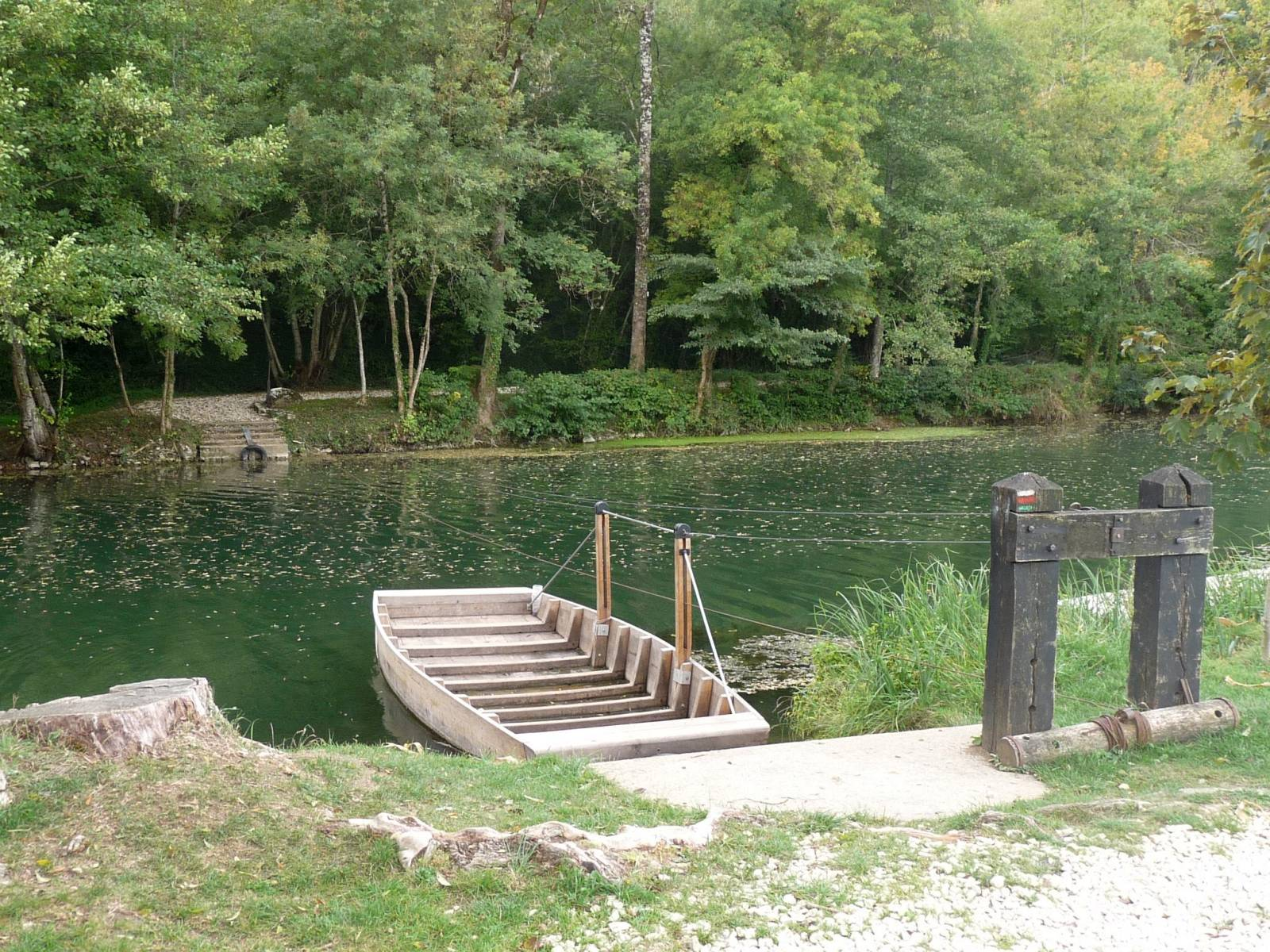
Barque of Lichères

== See also ==
- Communes of the Charente department
