= Coulonges, Charente =

Coulonges
- Commune
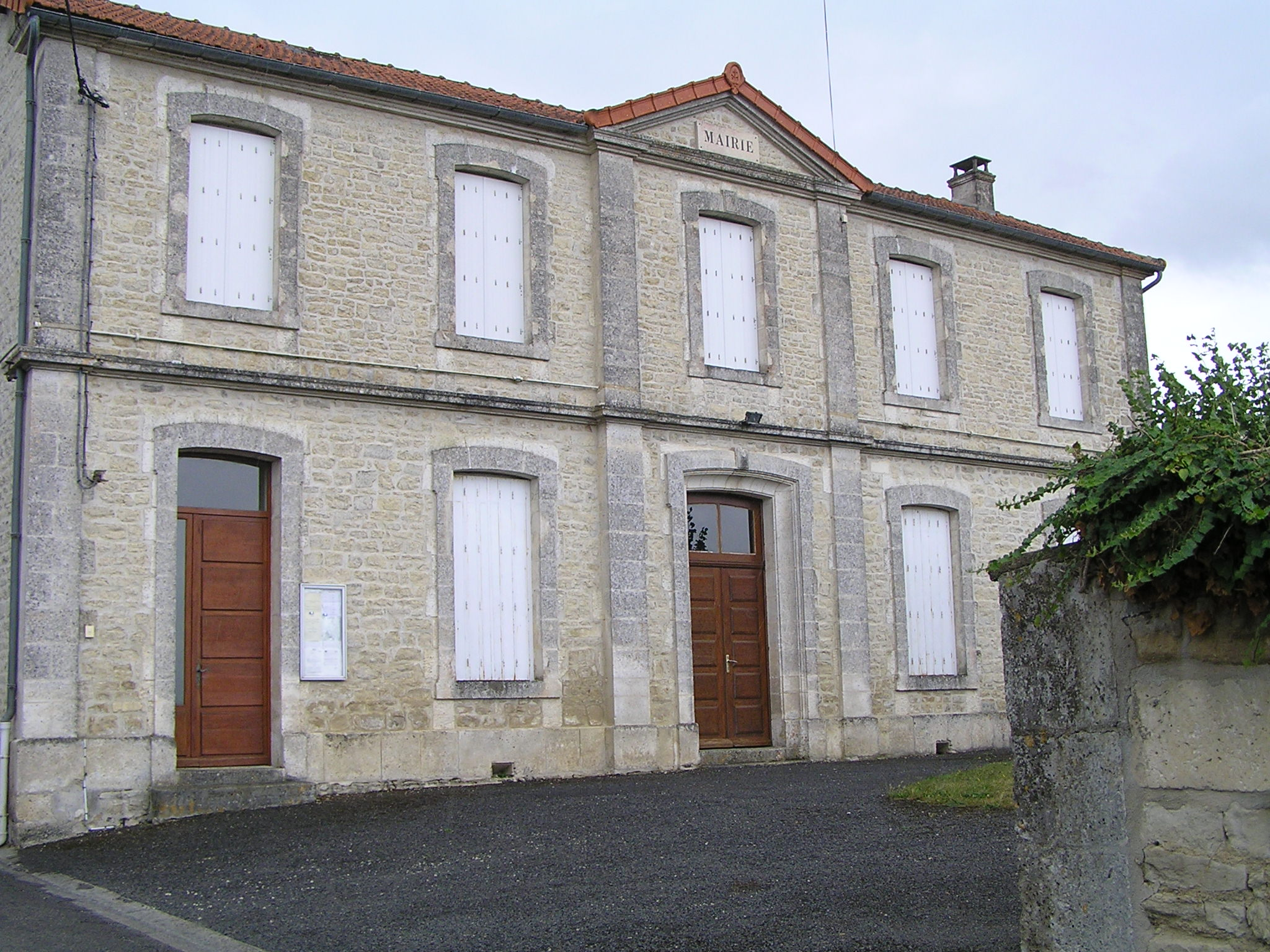
- Town hall
- Location of Coulonges
- Location within France Location within Nouvelle-Aquitaine
- Coordinates: 45°50′03″N 0°05′29″E
- Country: France
- Region: Nouvelle-Aquitaine
- Department: Charente
- Arrondissement: Confolens
- Canton: Boixe-et-Manslois
- Intercommunality: Cœur de Charente

Government
  - Mayor (2020–2026): Alain Blanchon
- Area^{1}: 3.02 km^{2} (1.17 sq mi)
- Elevation: 100 m (330 ft)
- Highest elevation: 124 m (407 ft)
- Lowest elevation: 53 m (174 ft)
- Population (2023): 116
  - Density: 38.4/km^{2} (99.5/sq mi)
- Time zone: UTC+01:00 (CET)
  - Summer (DST): UTC+02:00 (CEST)
- INSEE/Postal code: 16108 /16330
- ^{1} French Land Register data, which excludes lakes, ponds, glaciers > 1 km^{2} (0.386 sq mi or 247 acres) and river estuaries.

Coulonges (French pronunciation: [kulɔ̃ʒ]) is a commune in the Charente department in southwestern France.

== Population ==
Historical population
Year	Pop.	±% p.a.
1968	200	—
1975	176	−1.81%
1982	168	−0.66%
1990	135	−2.70%
1999	113	−1.96%
2007	148	+3.43%
2012	148	+0.00%
2017	133	−2.11%
2023	116	−2.25%
Source: INSEE

== See also ==
- Communes of the Charente department
