= Aussac-Vadalle =

- Commune
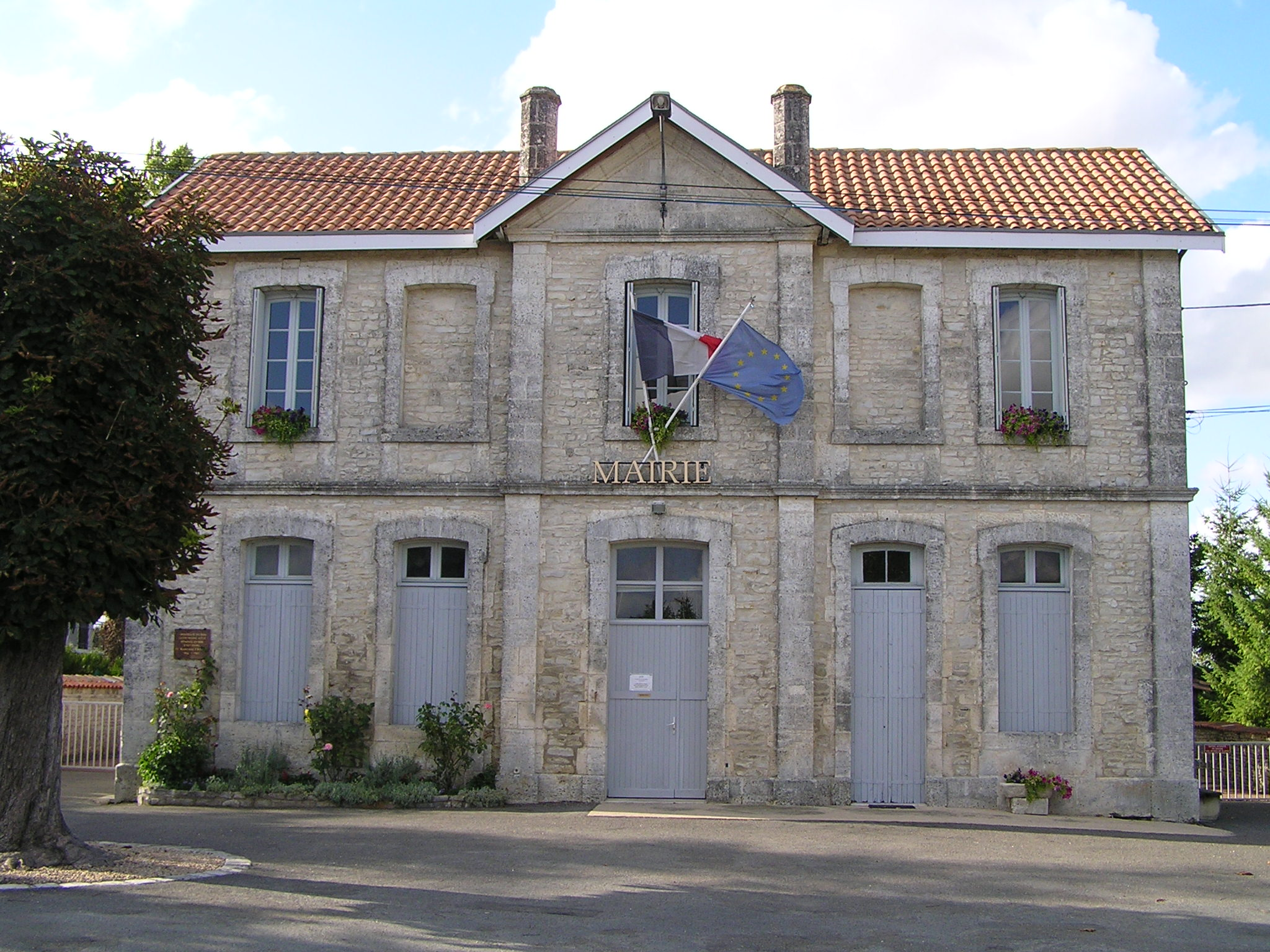
- Town hall
- Location of Aussac-Vadalle
- Location within France Location within Nouvelle-Aquitaine
- Coordinates: 45°49′02″N 0°13′17″E
- Country: France
- Region: Nouvelle-Aquitaine
- Department: Charente
- Arrondissement: Confolens
- Canton: Boixe-et-Manslois
- Intercommunality: CC Cœur Charente

Government
  - Mayor (2020–2026): Gérard Liot
- Area^{1}: 17.61 km^{2} (6.80 sq mi)
- Elevation: 109 m (358 ft)
- Highest elevation: 162 m (531 ft)
- Lowest elevation: 84 m (276 ft)
- Population (2023): 564
  - Density: 32.0/km^{2} (83.0/sq mi)
- Time zone: UTC+01:00 (CET)
  - Summer (DST): UTC+02:00 (CEST)
- INSEE/Postal code: 16024 /16560
- ^{1} French Land Register data, which excludes lakes, ponds, glaciers > 1 km^{2} (0.386 sq mi or 247 acres) and river estuaries.

Aussac-Vadalle (French pronunciation: [osak vadal]) is a commune in the Charente department in southwestern France.

== Population ==
Historical population
Year	Pop.	±% p.a.
1968	320	—
1975	315	−0.22%
1982	333	+0.80%
1990	387	+1.90%
1999	385	−0.06%
2007	402	+0.54%
2012	502	+4.54%
2017	513	+0.43%
2023	564	+1.59%
Source: INSEE

== See also ==
- Communes of the Charente department
