= Fontenille =

- Commune
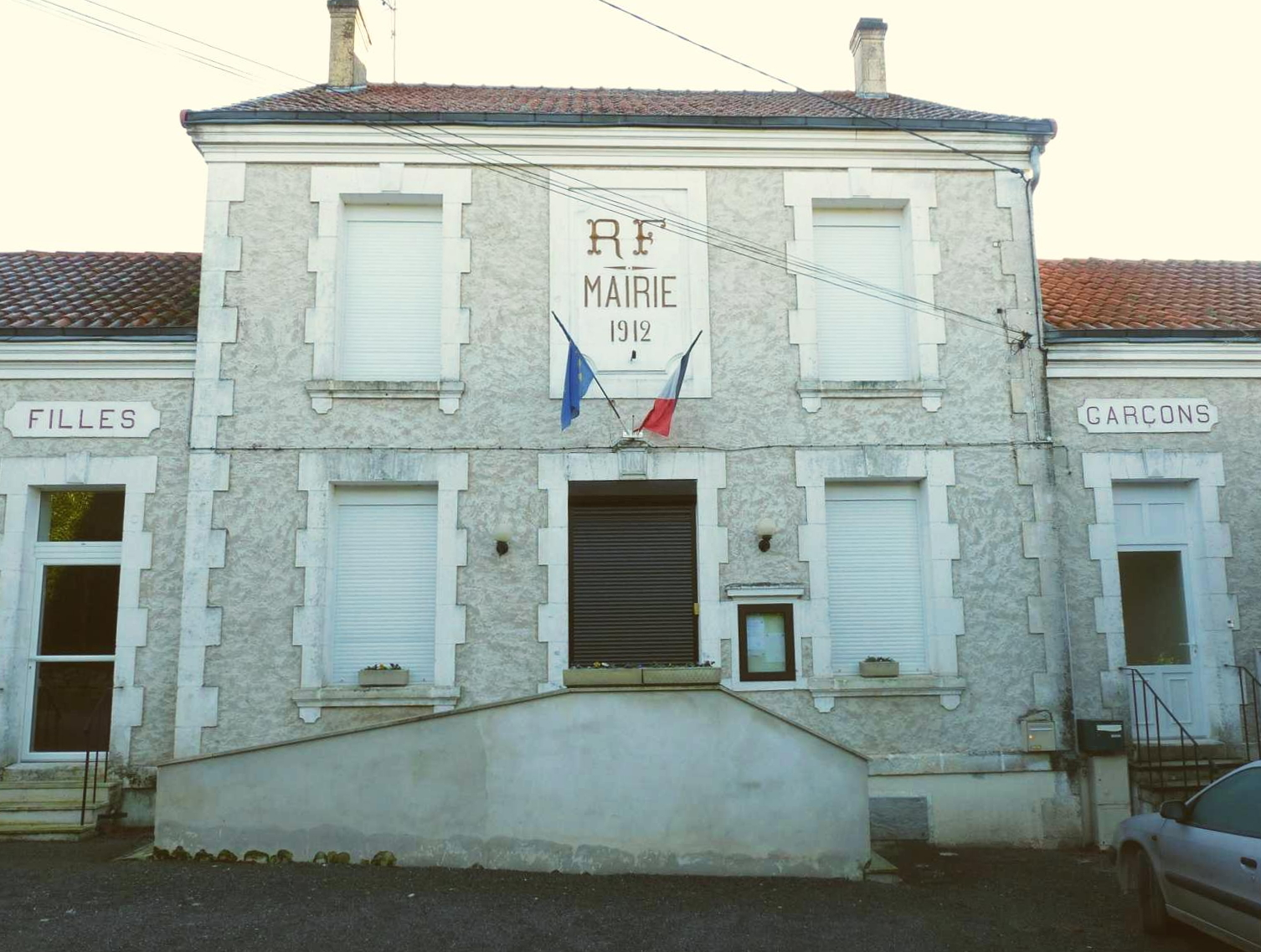
- Town hall
- Location of Fontenille
- Location within France Location within Nouvelle-Aquitaine
- Coordinates: 45°55′03″N 0°09′56″E
- Country: France
- Region: Nouvelle-Aquitaine
- Department: Charente
- Arrondissement: Confolens
- Canton: Boixe-et-Manslois
- Intercommunality: Cœur de Charente

Government
  - Mayor (2020–2026): Pierrick Coyaud
- Area^{1}: 9.52 km^{2} (3.68 sq mi)
- Elevation: 126 m (413 ft)
- Highest elevation: 128 m (420 ft)
- Lowest elevation: 55 m (180 ft)
- Population (2023): 353
  - Density: 37.1/km^{2} (96.0/sq mi)
- Time zone: UTC+01:00 (CET)
  - Summer (DST): UTC+02:00 (CEST)
- INSEE/Postal code: 16141 /16230
- ^{1} French Land Register data, which excludes lakes, ponds, glaciers > 1 km^{2} (0.386 sq mi or 247 acres) and river estuaries.

Fontenille (French pronunciation: [fɔ̃tnij]) is a commune in the Charente department in southwestern France.

== Population ==
Historical population
Year	Pop.	±% p.a.
1968	327	—
1975	346	+0.81%
1982	313	−1.42%
1990	335	+0.85%
1999	334	−0.03%
2007	337	+0.11%
2012	342	+0.29%
2017	322	−1.20%
2023	353	+1.54%
Source: INSEE

== See also ==
- Communes of the Charente department
