= Juillé, Charente =

Juillé
- Commune
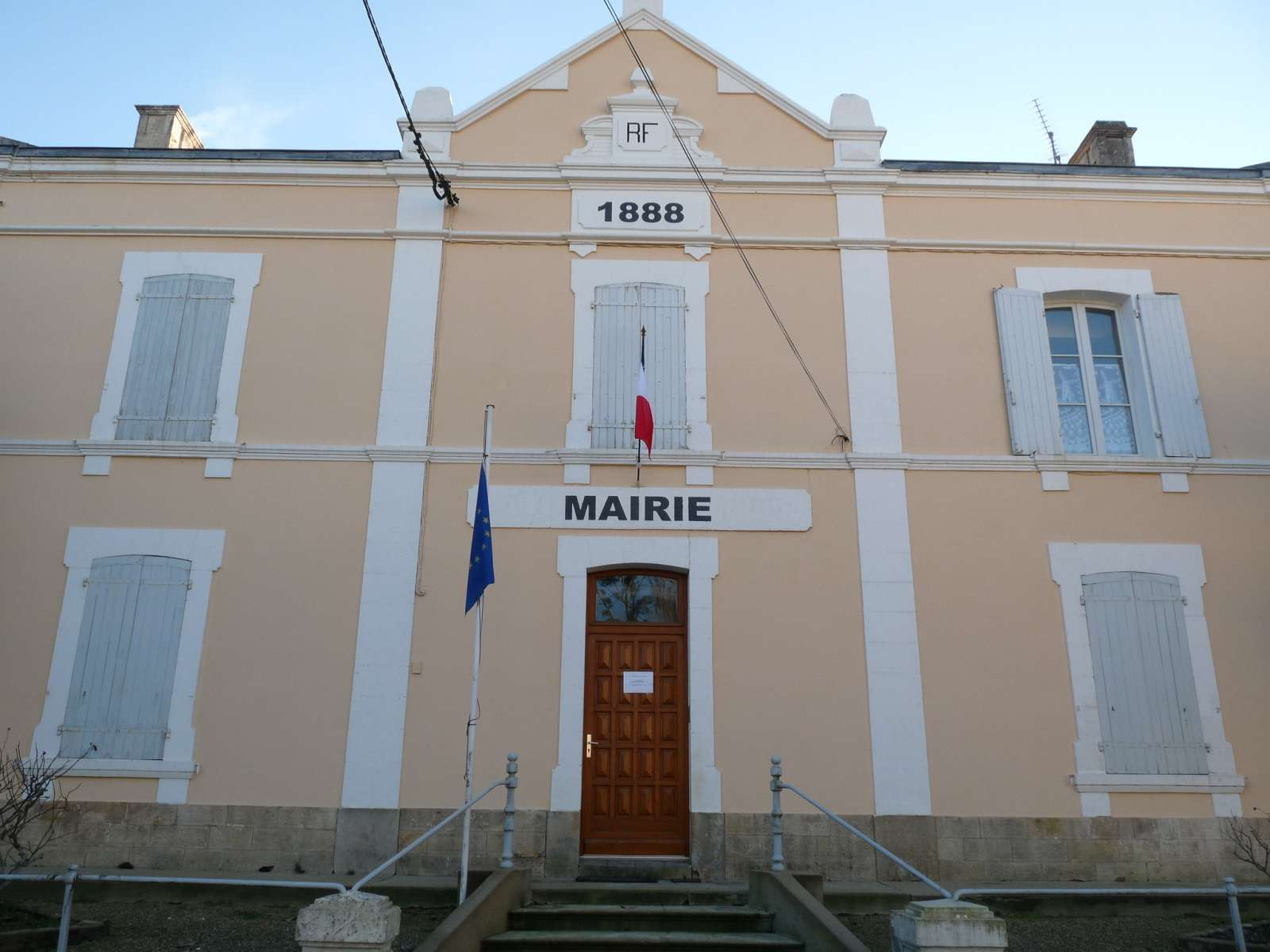
- Town hall
- Location of Juillé
- Location within France Location within Nouvelle-Aquitaine
- Coordinates: 45°55′52″N 0°08′40″E
- Country: France
- Region: Nouvelle-Aquitaine
- Department: Charente
- Arrondissement: Confolens
- Canton: Boixe-et-Manslois

Government
  - Mayor (2020–2026): Pascal Kaud
- Area^{1}: 8.60 km^{2} (3.32 sq mi)
- Elevation: 116 m (381 ft)
- Highest elevation: 116 m (381 ft)
- Lowest elevation: 56 m (184 ft)
- Population (2023): 173
  - Density: 20.1/km^{2} (52.1/sq mi)
- Time zone: UTC+01:00 (CET)
  - Summer (DST): UTC+02:00 (CEST)
- INSEE/Postal code: 16173 /16230
- ^{1} French Land Register data, which excludes lakes, ponds, glaciers > 1 km^{2} (0.386 sq mi or 247 acres) and river estuaries.

Juillé (French pronunciation: [ʒɥije]) is a commune in the Charente department in southwestern France.

== Population ==
Historical population
Year	Pop.	±% p.a.
1968	232	—
1975	218	−0.89%
1982	206	−0.81%
1990	198	−0.49%
1999	181	−0.99%
2007	186	+0.34%
2012	192	+0.64%
2017	184	−0.85%
2023	173	−1.02%
Source: INSEE

== See also ==
- Communes of the Charente department
