= Saint-Amant-de-Boixe =

- Commune
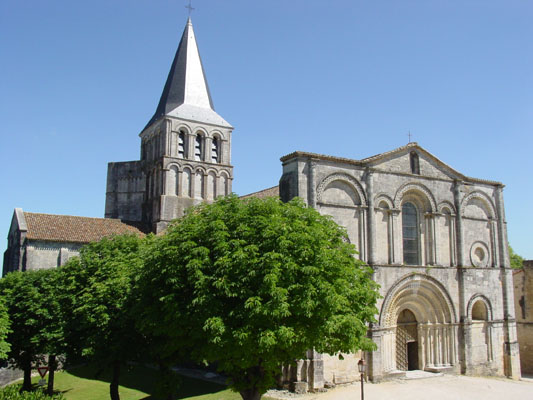
- The abbey in Saint-Amant-de-Boixe
- Location of Saint-Amant-de-Boixe
- Location within France Location within Nouvelle-Aquitaine
- Coordinates: 45°47′56″N 0°08′08″E
- Country: France
- Region: Nouvelle-Aquitaine
- Department: Charente
- Arrondissement: Confolens
- Canton: Boixe-et-Manslois

Government
  - Mayor (2024–2026): Paul Pinganaud
- Area^{1}: 22.39 km^{2} (8.64 sq mi)
- Elevation: 109 m (358 ft)
- Highest elevation: 139 m (456 ft)
- Lowest elevation: 41 m (135 ft)
- Population (2023): 1,341
  - Density: 59.89/km^{2} (155.1/sq mi)
- Time zone: UTC+01:00 (CET)
  - Summer (DST): UTC+02:00 (CEST)
- INSEE/Postal code: 16295 /16330
- ^{1} French Land Register data, which excludes lakes, ponds, glaciers > 1 km^{2} (0.386 sq mi or 247 acres) and river estuaries.

Saint-Amant-de-Boixe (French pronunciation: [sɛ̃.t‿amɑ̃ də bwaks]) is a commune in the Charente department in southwestern France.

== Population ==
Historical population
Year	Pop.	±% p.a.
1968	842	—
1975	877	+0.58%
1982	891	+0.23%
1990	997	+1.41%
1999	1,125	+1.35%
2007	1,302	+1.84%
2012	1,404	+1.52%
2017	1,370	−0.49%
2023	1,341	−0.36%
Source: INSEE

== See also ==
- Communes of the Charente department
