= Tourriers =

- Commune
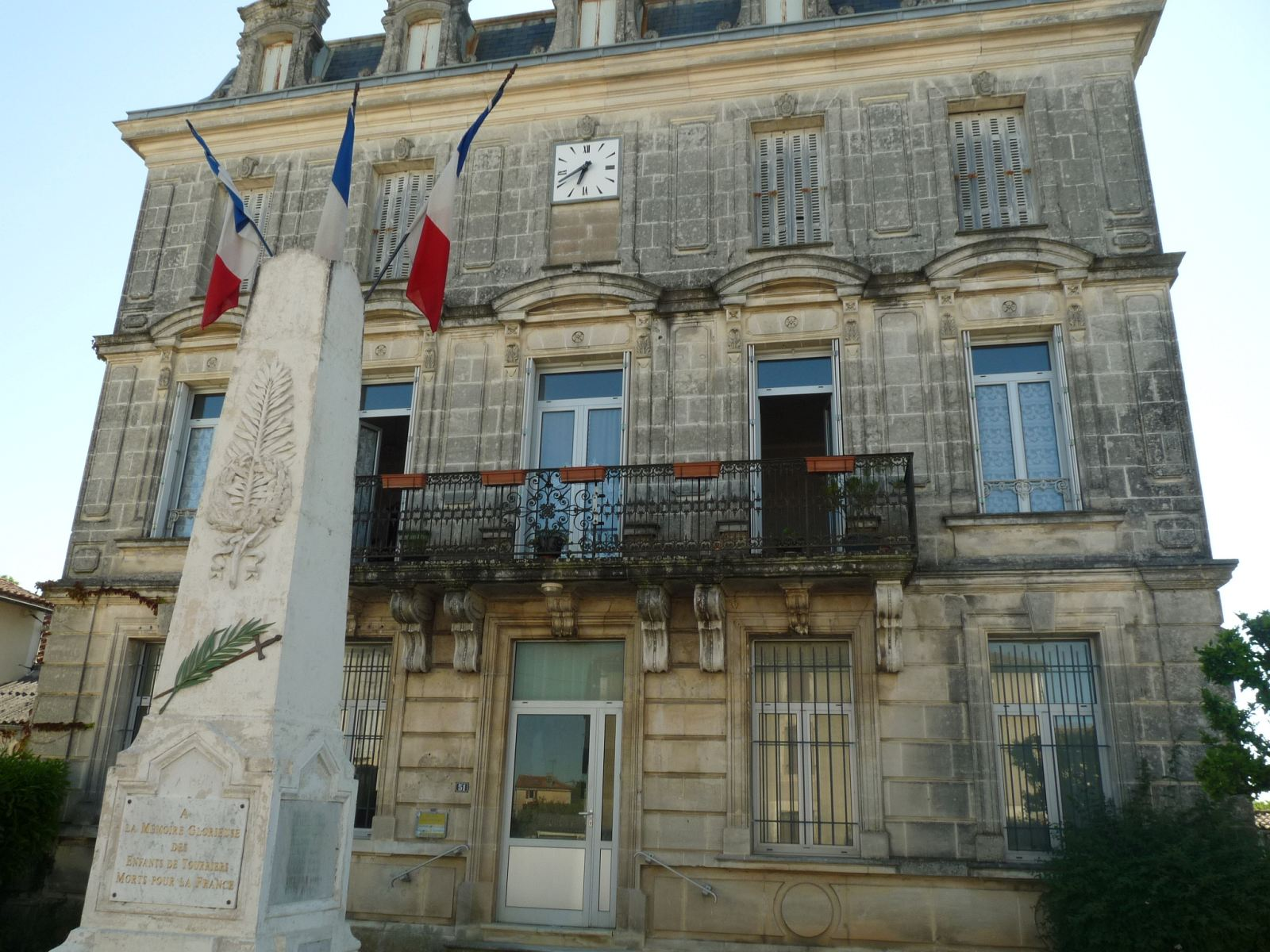
- Town hall

- Coat of arms
- Location of Tourriers
- Location within France Location within Nouvelle-Aquitaine
- Coordinates: 45°47′54″N 0°11′33″E
- Country: France
- Region: Nouvelle-Aquitaine
- Department: Charente
- Arrondissement: Confolens
- Canton: Boixe-et-Manslois

Government
  - Mayor (2020–2026): Laurent Danede
- Area^{1}: 6.77 km^{2} (2.61 sq mi)
- Elevation: 108 m (354 ft)
- Highest elevation: 141 m (463 ft)
- Lowest elevation: 89 m (292 ft)
- Population (2023): 802
  - Density: 118/km^{2} (307/sq mi)
- Time zone: UTC+01:00 (CET)
  - Summer (DST): UTC+02:00 (CEST)
- INSEE/Postal code: 16383 /16560
- ^{1} French Land Register data, which excludes lakes, ponds, glaciers > 1 km^{2} (0.386 sq mi or 247 acres) and river estuaries.

Tourriers (French pronunciation: [tuʁje]) is a commune in the Charente department in southwestern France.

== Population ==
Historical population
Year	Pop.	±% p.a.
1968	467	—
1975	543	+2.18%
1982	584	+1.05%
1990	579	−0.11%
1999	587	+0.15%
2007	713	+2.46%
2012	758	+1.23%
2017	758	+0.00%
2023	802	+0.94%
Source: INSEE

== See also ==
- Communes of the Charente department
