= Vervant, Charente =

Vervant
- Commune
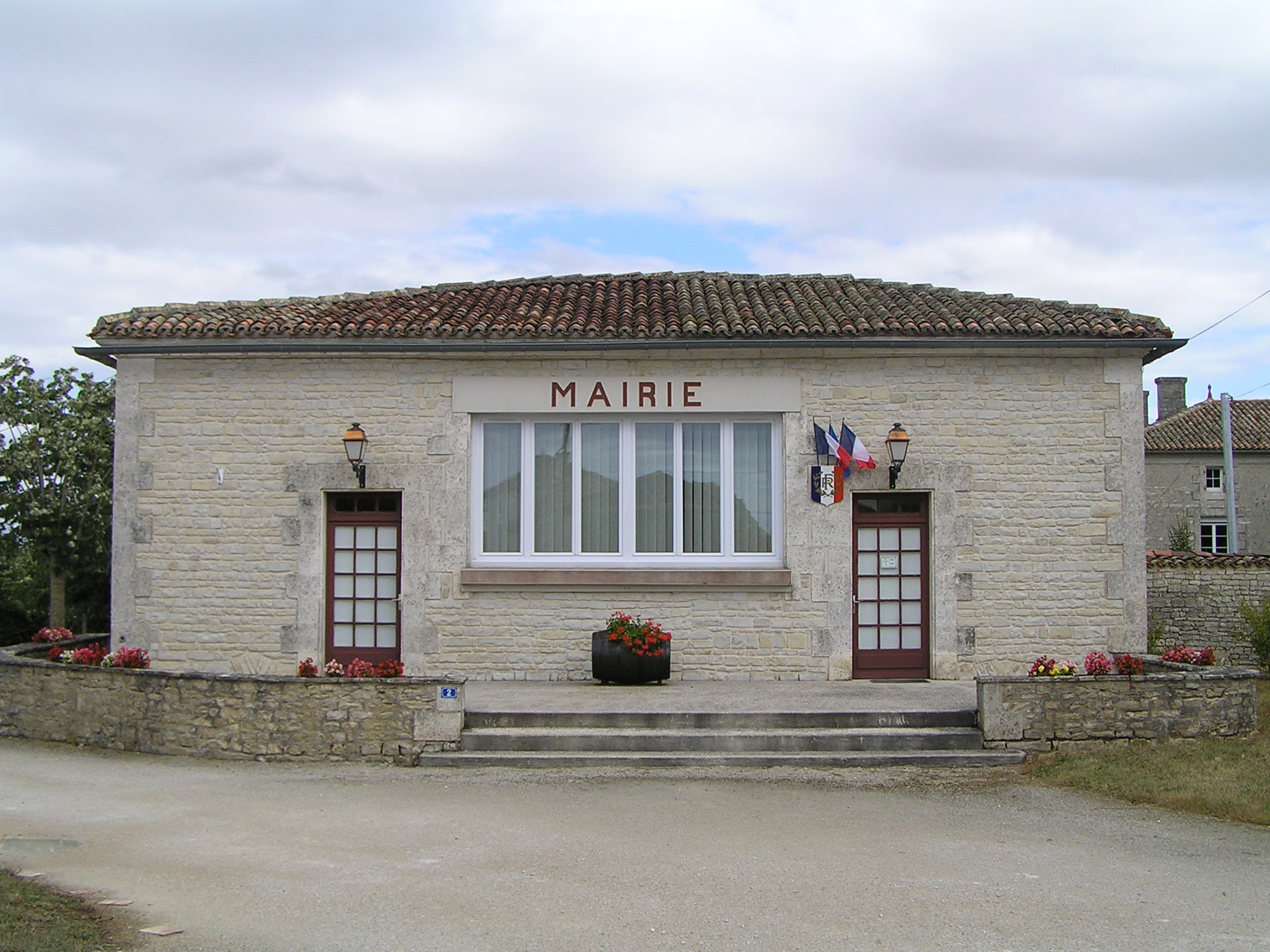
- Town hall
- Location of Vervant
- Location within France Location within Nouvelle-Aquitaine
- Coordinates: 45°49′59″N 0°07′28″E
- Country: France
- Region: Nouvelle-Aquitaine
- Department: Charente
- Arrondissement: Confolens
- Canton: Boixe-et-Manslois
- Intercommunality: Cœur de Charente

Government
  - Mayor (2020–2026): Jocelyne Magnant
- Area^{1}: 9.56 km^{2} (3.69 sq mi)
- Elevation: 82 m (269 ft)
- Highest elevation: 119 m (390 ft)
- Lowest elevation: 65 m (213 ft)
- Population (2023): 147
  - Density: 15.4/km^{2} (39.8/sq mi)
- Time zone: UTC+01:00 (CET)
  - Summer (DST): UTC+02:00 (CEST)
- INSEE/Postal code: 16401 /16330
- ^{1} French Land Register data, which excludes lakes, ponds, glaciers > 1 km^{2} (0.386 sq mi or 247 acres) and river estuaries.

Vervant (French pronunciation: [vɛʁvɑ̃]) is a commune in the Charente department in southwestern France.

== Population ==
Historical population
Year	Pop.	±% p.a.
1968	138	—
1975	152	+1.39%
1982	140	−1.17%
1990	152	+1.03%
1999	142	−0.75%
2007	134	−0.72%
2012	147	+1.87%
2017	146	−0.14%
2023	147	+0.11%
Source: INSEE

== See also ==
- Communes of the Charente department
