= Saint-Front, Charente =

Saint-Front
- Commune
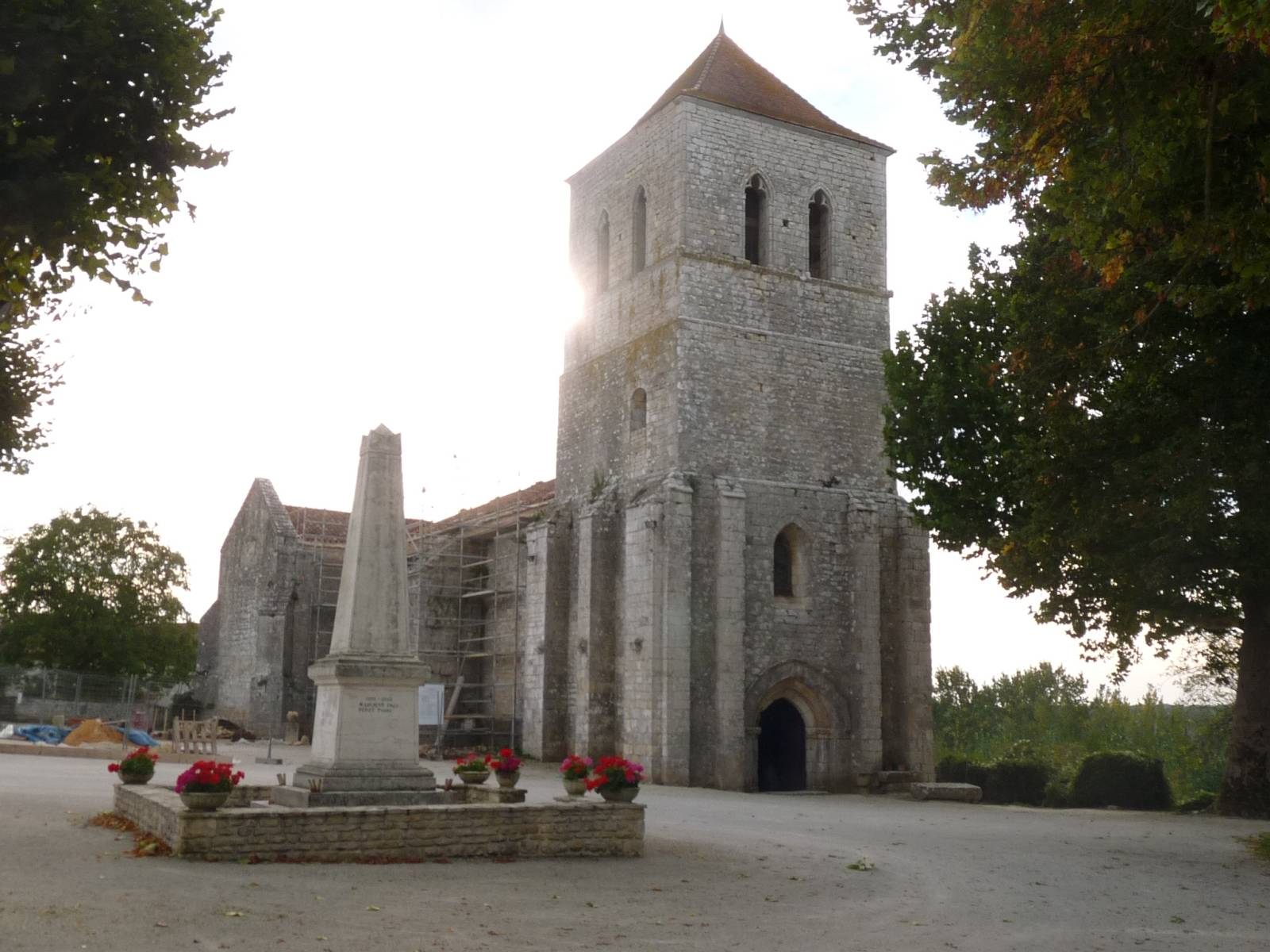
- The church in Saint-Front
- Location of Saint-Front
- Location within France Location within Nouvelle-Aquitaine
- Coordinates: 45°53′41″N 0°17′24″E
- Country: France
- Region: Nouvelle-Aquitaine
- Department: Charente
- Arrondissement: Confolens
- Canton: Boixe-et-Manslois
- Intercommunality: Cœur de Charente

Government
  - Mayor (2020–2026): Sébastien Charriaud
- Area^{1}: 13.35 km^{2} (5.15 sq mi)
- Elevation: 65 m (213 ft)
- Highest elevation: 119 m (390 ft)
- Lowest elevation: 66 m (217 ft)
- Population (2023): 355
  - Density: 26.6/km^{2} (68.9/sq mi)
- Time zone: UTC+01:00 (CET)
  - Summer (DST): UTC+02:00 (CEST)
- INSEE/Postal code: 16318 /16460
- ^{1} French Land Register data, which excludes lakes, ponds, glaciers > 1 km^{2} (0.386 sq mi or 247 acres) and river estuaries.

Saint-Front (French pronunciation: [sɛ̃ fʁɔ̃]; Occitan: Sent Front) is a commune in the Charente department in southwestern France.

== Population ==
Historical population
Year	Pop.	±% p.a.
1968	408	—
1975	378	−1.09%
1982	372	−0.23%
1990	301	−2.61%
1999	315	+0.51%
2007	326	+0.43%
2012	353	+1.60%
2017	369	+0.89%
2023	355	−0.64%
Source: INSEE

== See also ==
- Communes of the Charente department
