= Megalithic sites of Charente =

Megalithic monuments in Charente, France

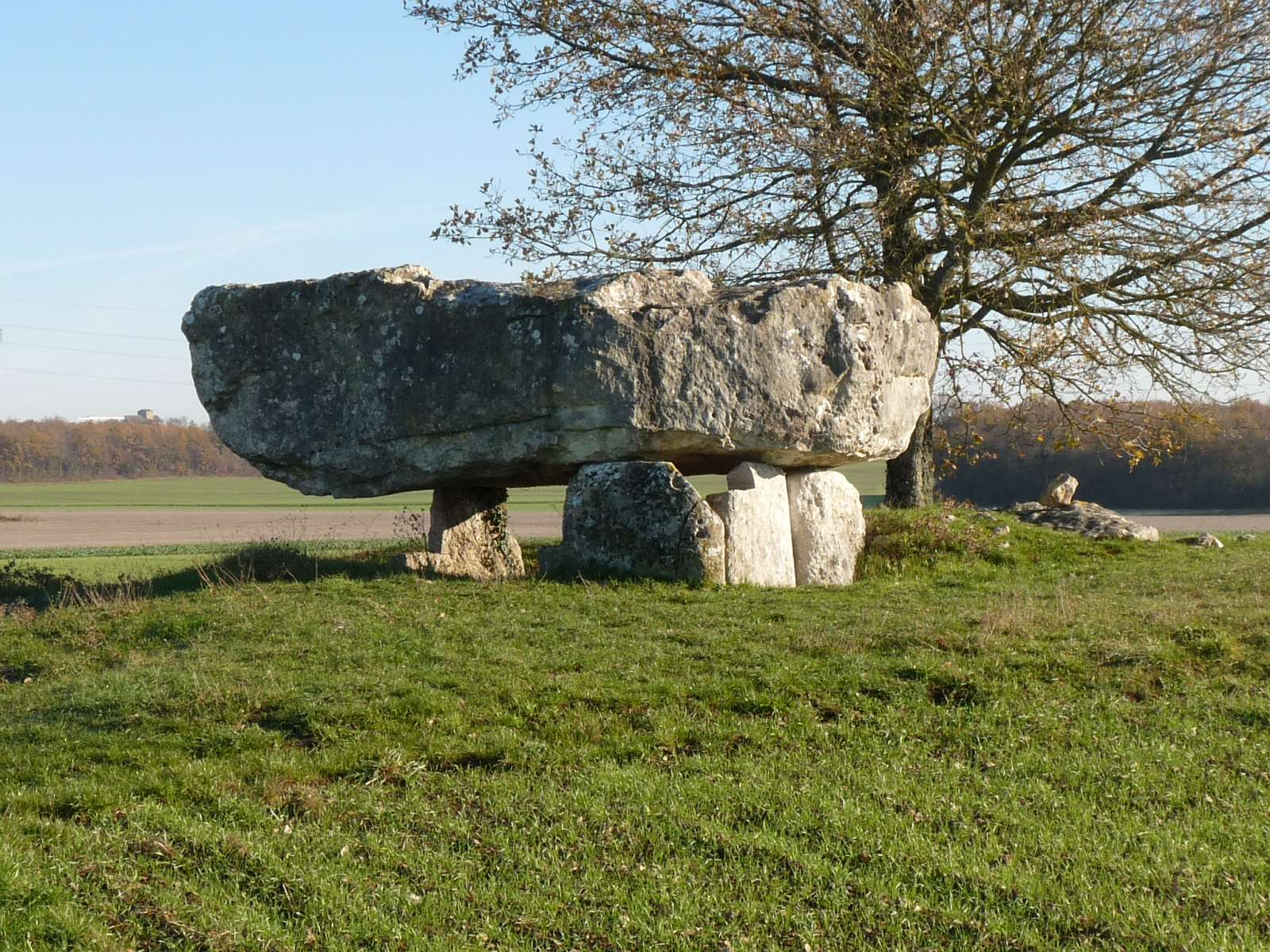
Dolmen of Petite Pérotte.

The Megalithic sites of Charente, France consist mainly of dolmens, while menhirs are rare and few are still standing.

== Geographical distribution ==
The north-western quarter of the department (the Ruffécois) has a rich concentration of megalithic monuments. Tumuli and dolmens are often grouped in veritable necropolises (Tusson, Ligné, Fontenille, Luxé, Chenon), and it is well known that almost a third of the monuments recorded in this area were destroyed between the mid-19th and late 20th centuries, mainly as a result of the land consolidation that took place in the 1960s and 1970s. On the other hand, the persistence of large wooded areas has locally contributed to the preservation of several concentrations of burial mounds.

In the west of the department, several remarkable dolmens are located on the left bank of the Charente (Châteaubernard, Cognac, Saint-Même-les-Carrières, la Boucharderie). In the south-west, several megaliths that were once reported have now disappeared, victims of the boom in wine-growing; in the south-east, several dolmens are well preserved (Ronsenac, Édon necropolis); as for the north-east of the department, it concentrates the department's main menhirs.

== Characteristics ==
Blank administrative map of the department of Charente, France, intended for geolocation, with distinct boundaries of regions, departments, and districts.

There are several types of dolmen:

- corridor dolmens, the oldest;
- Angoumoisin-type dolmens, the most numerous;
- dolmens similar to Anjou dolmens in their monumentality;
- simple dolmens and chests, the most recent (late 4th and 3rd millennia).

The Angoumois-type dolmen features a quadrangular chamber covered with a monumental slab in its raw state, with a slightly off-center corridor. The walls are made of carefully assembled, bush-hammered orthostats. The corridor is made up of slabs or low dry-stone walls (Les Pérottes, Motte de la Jacquille). But there are also variants with a round or square chamber where the walls are made entirely of small, stacked dry stones, and the roof must have been a corbelled vault or made of perishable materials.

Several dolmens in the Cognaçais region have been considered to be Angevin dolmens due to their characteristics (massive roof slabs, high bush-hammered pillars, rectangular chambers), but none have a portico that is still visible. The simple dolmens in the southeastern part of the department, made of sandstone blocks, reflect the proximity of the neighboring dolmens of the Perigord Causses, with their trapezoidal chambers delimited by just three orthostats.

Some monuments stand out for their originality (dolmen A4 de la Pièce Grande) or unique architectural features (Motte de la Jacquille).

== Megalithic art ==
Engraved representations on the walls of dolmens are fairly common, mainly crossbows (Roc dolmen, A and B de la Boixe dolmens), axes (Grosse Pérotte), hooks (Motte de la Garde).

== Inventory ==
| Name | Municipality | Remarks | | Coordinates | Illustration |
|---|---|---|---|---|---|
| Dolmen of Montvallier | Ansac-sur-Vienne | | destroyed | | |
| The Bouguignon tomb | Balzac | | destroyed | | |
| Dolmen of Cuchet | Barro | | destroyed | | |
| Dolmen of Gragonne | Bessé | | ruined | 45°56′45″N 0°05′36″E | |
| Dolmen of the Pierre Blanche | Bessé | | National heritage (1930) | 45°56′49″N 0°05′35″E | |
| Pierres Brunes de Chavenat | Boisné-La Tude | | ruined | | |
| Dolmen of Chez Rolland | Bourg-Charente | | destroyed | | |
| Pierre Levade | Bouteville | | destroyed | | |
| Pierre Levée of Douvesse | Bouteville | | destroyed | | |
| Pierre Levée de la Combe | Brie | | destroyed | | |
| Tumulus de la Braconne | Brie | 2 burial mounds | 1 ruined, 1 destroyed | | |
| Pierres Bleues de la Vallade | Brigueuil | 2 possible menhirs (standing stones) | | 45°56′06″N 0°49′40″E | |
| Pierre du sacrifice | Cellettes | another name: Dolmen A de la Boixe | | 45°50′40″N 0°08′57″E | |
| Dolmen of the Bois du Soulier | Charras | another name: Dolmen de Grosbot | | 45°33′20″N 0°24′22″E | |
| Menhirs of Font Pouzat | Charras | 2 menhirs (standing stones) | | 200 m south of the Bois du Soulier dolmen | |
| Dolmen at Combe des Dames | Châteaubernard | | | 45°40′31″N 0°19′46″W | |
| Tumulus of the Pierre Folle | Chenommet | dolmen | National heritage (2012) | 45°55′48″N 0°15′44″E | |
| Dolmen de la Grelaudière | Chenon | | destroyed | | |
| Dolmens de l'Echalette | Chenon | 2 dolmens | | 45°57′17″N 0°12′56″E | |
| Dolmens de la Pièce Grande | Chenon | 4 dolmens | | 45°57′37″N 0°12′43″E 45°57′29″N 0°12′54″E 45°57′28″N 0°12′56″E 45°57′37″N 0°12′57″E | |
| Le Gros Chail | La Chèvrerie | polisher | | preserved in the Musée de la Société archéologique et historique de la Charente | |
| Dolmen of Séchebec | Cognac | | National heritage (1930) | 45°41′33″N 0°18′35″W | |
| Dolmen de la Mouline | Combiers | | disappeared | | |
| Dolmen of Périssac | Confolens and Esse | | dismantled and reused | 46°01′17″N 0°40′00″E | |
| Dolmen de la Pierre-Pèse | Courcôme | | destroyed | | |
| Dolmens of Magnez | Courcôme | another name: Dolmens de la Garenne de Magné | National heritage (1930) | 45°58′44″N 0°06′19″E | |
| Dolmen du Gros-Caillou | Criteuil-la-Magdeleine | another name: Dolmen du Grand Fief | ruined | 45°32′07″N 0°12′08″W | |
| Dolmen of the Etang | Dignac | | | | |
| Dolmen de la Brande | Dirac | another name: Pierre Levade de la Brande | | 45°34′27″N 0°14′58″E | |
| Necropolis of Édon | Édon | Dolmen de la Gélie Dolmen de la Lombertie or Pierre Rouge Menhir de la Pierre Debout | National heritage (1989) | 45°30′13″N 0°21′21″E 45°30′06″N 0°21′32″E 45°29′46″N 0°21′47″E | |
| Dolmen of Pierre Brune | Empuré | | destroyed around 1912 | | |
| Dolmen du Repaire | Esse | | destroyed | | |
| Dolmen of the Curé's Tomb | Esse | | ruined | | |
| Menhir du Repaire | Esse | another name: Menhir des Boisselées | | 46°00′31″N 0°41′49″E | |
| Dolmen de la Forêt | Étagnac | | | | |
| Menhir de la Forêt | Étagnac | | | | |
| Dolmen known as Gagnère-Prat | Fontenille | | destroyed in 1964 | was located 300 m east of Grosse Pérotte | |
| Dolmen du Roc de la Fade | Fontenille | | destroyed in the mid-19th century | | |
| Dolmens des Pérottes | Fontenille | Petite Pérotte Grande Pérotte | National heritage (1900) | 45°54′45″N 0°08′35″E | |
| Motte de la Jacquille | Fontenille | dolmen | National heritage (1991) | 45°54′27″N 0°10′05″E | |
| Grosse Pierre des Deffends | Fontenille | | destroyed around 1955 | | |
| Tumulus des Bourriges | Fouqueure | 2 dolmens | | 45°53′17″N 0°05′30″E | |
| Pierre Ceinturée | Jauldes | possible menhir | | | |
| Dolmen de la Madeleine | Lessac | | National heritage (1900) | 46°02′42″N 0°40′52″E | |
| Dolmen of Gros-Dognon | Ligné | | ruined | 45°55′01″N 0°05′53″E | |
| Dolmen de Bel Air | Luxé | | destroyed | | |
| Dolmen de la Folatière | Luxé | | National heritage (1957) | 45°54′04″N 0°09′03″E | |
| Dolmen du Roc | Luxé | | destroyed | | |
| Maison de la Vieille | Luxé | | National heritage (1956) | 45°54′35″N 0°08′24″E | |
| Motte de la Garde | Luxé | dolmen | National heritage (1889) | 45°54′28″N 0°08′13″E | |
| Tumulus de la Folatière | Luxé | | National heritage (1957) | 45°54′02″N 0°08′58″E | |
| Polissoir | Magnac-sur-Touvre | | | 45°39′37″N 0°14′37″E | |
| Dolmen de Montardy | Maine-de-Boixe | | destroyed in 1972 | | |
| Dolmen de la Gare | Manot | | destroyed | | |
| Dolmen de Montvallier | Manot | | destroyed | | |
| Dolmen des Cabournes | Manot | | ruined | | |
| Dolmen and menhir at La Couchadie | Manot | | ruined dolmen vanished menhir | | |
| Mégalithe de la Goutrie | Manot | | destroyed around 1945 | | |
| Pierre Oiseau | Manot | undetermined megalith | destroyed around 1945 | | |
| Pierre Paize | Manot | dolmen | destroyed | | |
| Pierres de Saint-Martial | Manot | undetermined megaliths | | | |
| Dolmen de Tauzat | Massignac | | National heritage (1929) | 45°46′33″N 0°37′26″E | |
| Gros Caillou | Montmérac | dolmen | | destroyed | |
| Grosse Borne du Perret | Oradour | possible menhir | | 45°54′33″N 0°02′52″E | |
| Roc des Sorciers | Pleuville | menhir | | | |
| Dolmen des Fontiaux | Raix | | destroyed in 1962 | | |
| Dolmen de Chez Vinaigre | Ronsenac | another name: Dolmen de Bernac | | 45°26′58″N 0°16′17″E | |
| Dolmen of Boucharderie | Roullet-Saint-Estèphe | | National heritage (1927) | 45°33′30″N 0°01′32″E | |
| Dolmen of Garde-Épée | Saint-Brice | | National heritage (1926) | 45°41′24″N 0°15′05″W | |
| Menhir of Champ du Roc | Saint-Christophe | | | relocated 46°00′11″N 0°50′57″E | |
| Menhirs of Grosse Pierre de la Fourgeodie | Saint-Christophe | 3 menhirs | | | |
| Dolmen of Bois des Chailles | Saint-Ciers-sur-Bonnieure | another name: Dolmen des Grouges | National heritage (1912) | 45°52′20″N 0°14′15″E | |
| Dolmen of Pierre Levée de Saint-Fort | Saint-Fort-sur-le-Né | | National heritage (1983) | 45°34′21″N 0°17′39″W | |
| Dolmen of Pierrefite | Saint-Georges | | | | |
| Dolmen of Rochepine | Saint-Germain-de-Montbron | | | | |
| Dolmen of Perradet | Saint-Groux | | destroyed | | |
| Dolmens of Brunie | Saint-Maurice-des-Lions | 2 dolmens | ruined | | |
| Dolmen des Courades | Saint-Même-les-Carrières | another name: Pierre Levée | National heritage (1926) | 45°37′58″N 0°09′29″W | |
| Pierre levée de la Folatière | Salles-de-Villefagnan | dolmen | ruined | | |
| Dolmen de Lage | Saulgond | | | | |
| Dolmen de Grapillet | Soyaux | | destroyed in 1836 | | |
| Dolmen de la Pierre Martine | Suris | | destroyed in the 19th century | | |
| Tumuli of Tusson | Tusson | 4 tumuli: Le Vieux Breuil La Justice Le Gros Dognon Le Petit Dognon | National heritage (1962) National heritage (1960) National heritage (1960) | 45°55′54″N 0°04′53″E 45°56′19″N 0°05′13″E 45°56′01″N 0°04′59″E | |
| Necropolis of La Boixe | Vervant | | National heritage (1889) National heritage (1971) National heritage (1991) | 45°50′34″N 0°08′55″E | |
| Dolmens of Plantier de Montieret | Villefagnan | 2 dolmens | destroyed | | |
| Dolmen of Rocs de Laine | Voulgézac | | | | |

== Bibliography ==
- Laporte, Luc; Lopez-Romero, Elias; Bernard, Régis (2016). "Les tumulus allongés du Centre-Ouest de la France - Nécropoles, espaces, paysages" [The elongated tumuli of Central-West France - Necropolises, spaces, landscapes]. Fonctions, utilisations et représentations de l'espace dans les sépultures monumentales du Néolithique européen [Functions, uses and representations of space in monumental burials of the European Neolithic] (in French). Aix-en-Provence: Presses Universitaires de Provence. p. 265-281. ISBN 979-10-320-0048-9.
- Lièvre, Auguste-François (1883). "Exploration archéologique du département de la Charente" [Archaeological exploration of the Charente department]. Mémoire de la Société Archéologique et historique de la Charente (in French). 6: 91-135.
- Michon, Jean-Hippolyte (1844). Statistique monumentale de la Charente [Monumental statistics of Charente] (in French). Paris: Derache. p. 137-148.
- Mortillet, Gabriel de (1896). "Les monuments mégalithiques classés de la Charente et de la Charente-Inférieure" [The listed megalithic monuments of Charente and Charente-Inférieure]. Bulletins de la Société d'anthropologie de Paris (in French). 7: 91-135.
- Joussaume, Roger (2016). "Palets et minches de Gargantua : Mégalithisme dans le Centre-Ouest de la France" [Gargantua's Palets and Minches: Megalithism in Central-West France]. Association des Publications Chauvinoises (in French): 388. ISBN 979-1090534391.
- Pourtaud, Jean-Sébastien (2021). Dolmens, menhirs, tumulus et pierres à légendes en Charente [Dolmens, menhirs, tumuli and legendary stones in Charente] (in French). Les Indes savantes. p. 280. ISBN 978-2-84654-581-5.
