= Ligné =

Ligné may refer to the following places in France:

- Ligné, Charente, a commune in the Charente department
- Ligné, Loire-Atlantique, a commune in the Loire-Atlantique department
