= Villegats =

Villegats may refer to the following places in France:

- Villegats, Charente, a commune in the Charente department
- Villegats, Eure, a commune in the Eure department
