= Brie, Charente =

Brie
- Commune
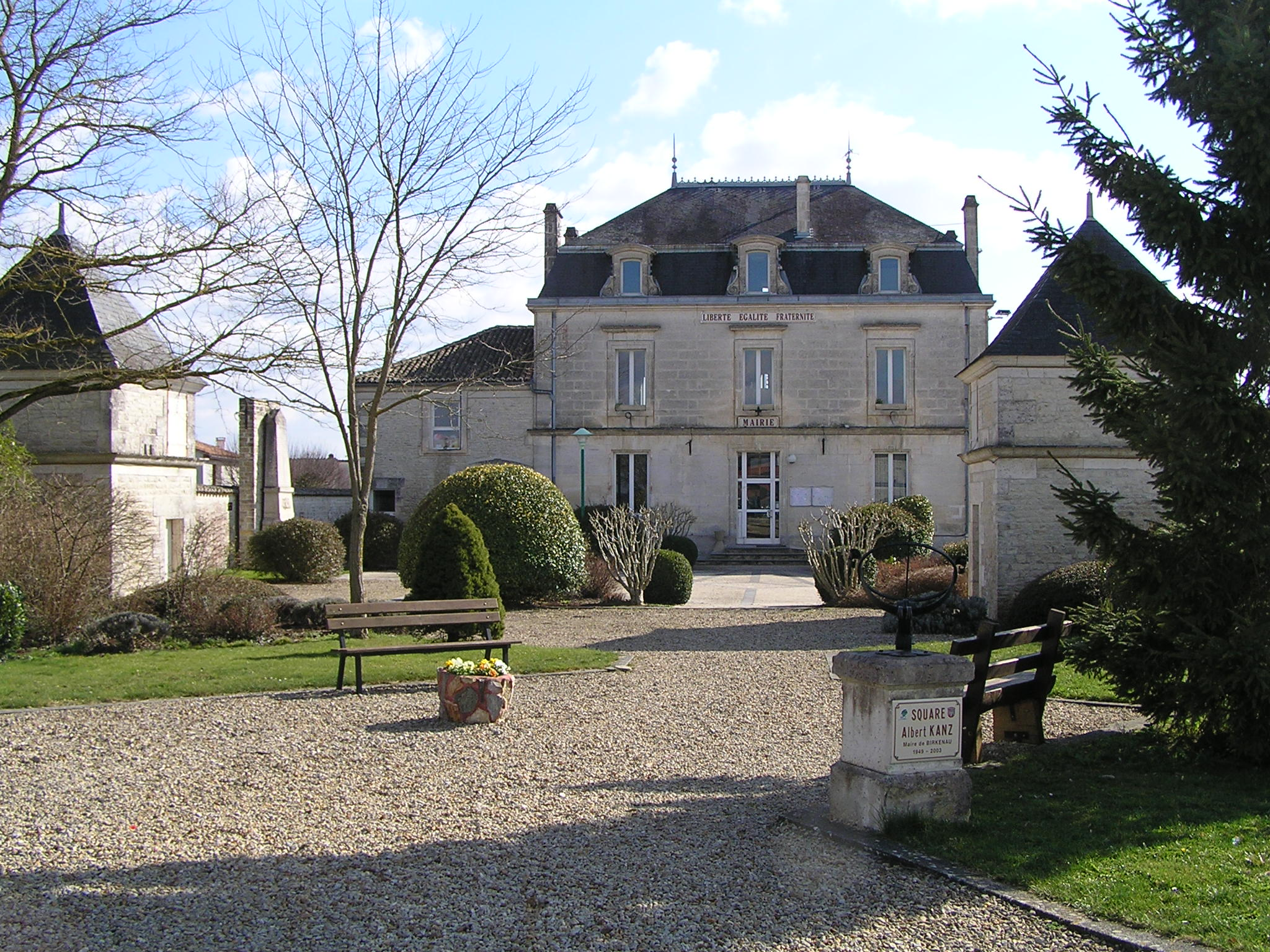
- Town hall

- Coat of arms
- Location of Brie
- Location within France Location within Nouvelle-Aquitaine
- Coordinates: 45°44′18″N 0°14′29″E
- Country: France
- Region: Nouvelle-Aquitaine
- Department: Charente
- Arrondissement: Angoulême
- Canton: Touvre-et-Braconne
- Intercommunality: Grand Angoulême

Government
  - Mayor (2020–2026): Michel Buisson
- Area^{1}: 34.05 km^{2} (13.15 sq mi)
- Elevation: 135 m (443 ft)
- Highest elevation: 167 m (548 ft)
- Lowest elevation: 67 m (220 ft)
- Population (2023): 4,125
  - Density: 121.1/km^{2} (313.8/sq mi)
- Time zone: UTC+01:00 (CET)
  - Summer (DST): UTC+02:00 (CEST)
- INSEE/Postal code: 16061 /16590
- ^{1} French Land Register data, which excludes lakes, ponds, glaciers > 1 km^{2} (0.386 sq mi or 247 acres) and river estuaries.

Brie (French pronunciation: [bʁi]) is a commune in the Charente department in southwestern France.

== History ==
The registers of civil status go back to 1665. The family of Nesmond, an illustrious family of the Angoumois, has long resided in the commune and possessed two houses, in the town and the Jauvigère.

In the 19th century, the military administration established the firing range (called the shooting range) in the forest of La Braconne, for nearly two leagues. It was provided with drinking water thanks to a pipeline, water from the sources of the Touvre. It was occupied at the beginning of the 20th century by the various regiments of the 12th Army Corps.

During the first half of the 20th century, the commune was served by the Angoulême line at Saint-Angeau of the Charentes economic railway called the little Mairat, with metric gauge, and a stop was located at the foot of the village.

== Climate ==
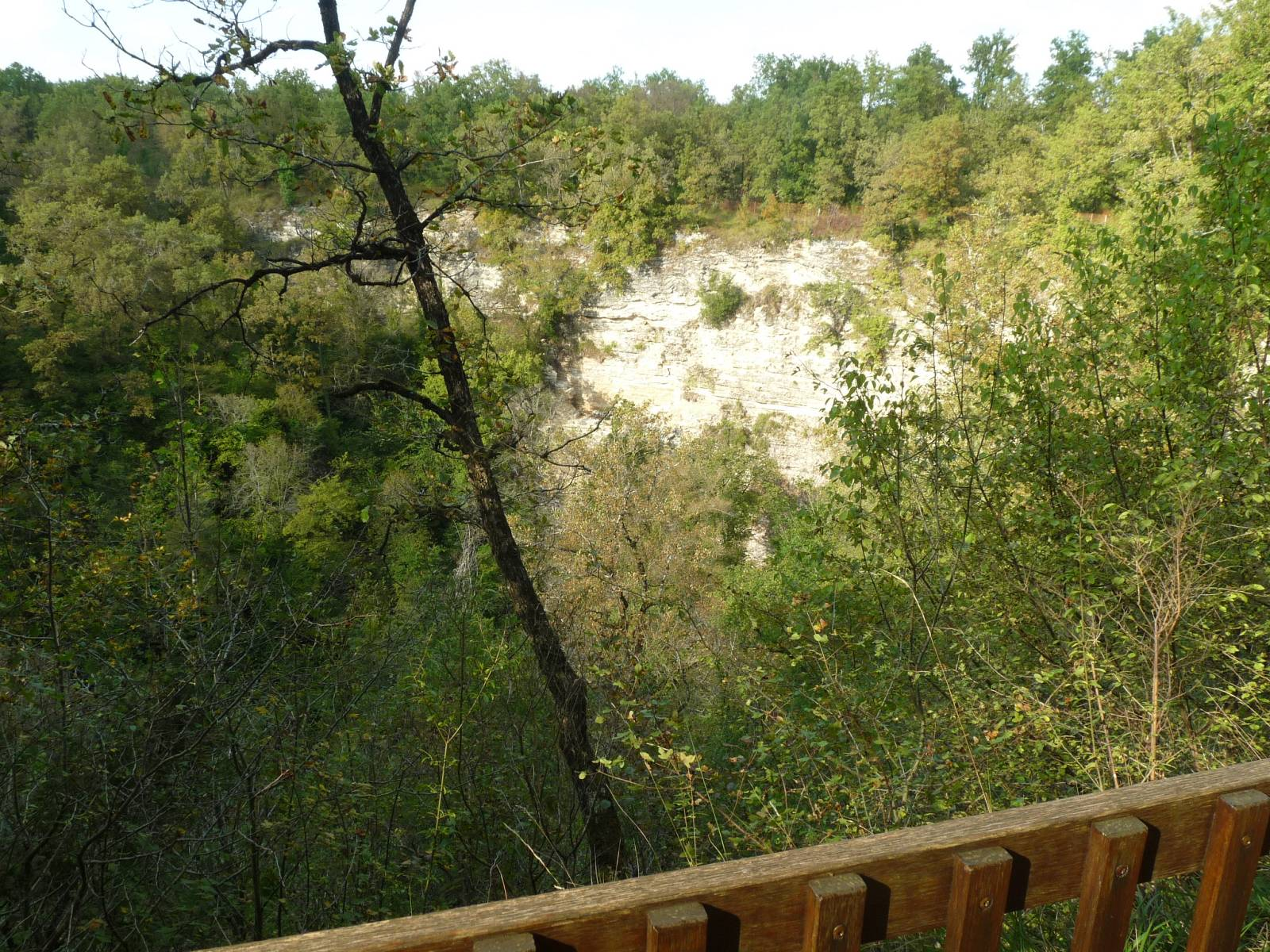
Braconne grande forest

The climate is oceanic Aquitaine and similar to that of the town of Cognac where the nearest meteorological station is located.

The Braconne forest occupies the eastern part of the commune, with the military camp of the 515th regiment of the train.

== Population ==
Historical population

Year	Pop.	±% p.a.
1800	1,742	—
1806	1,509	−2.36%
1821	1,728	+0.91%
1831	2,054	+1.74%
1841	1,868	−0.94%
1846	1,960	+0.97%
1851	2,118	+1.56%
1856	1,952	−1.62%
1861	1,754	−2.12%
1866	1,733	−0.24%
1872	1,665	−0.66%
1876	1,616	−0.74%
1881	1,718	+1.23%
1886	1,557	−1.95%
1891	1,370	−2.53%
1896	1,287	−1.24%
1901	1,228	−0.93%
1906	1,224	−0.07%

Year	Pop.	±% p.a.
1911	1,170	−0.90%
1921	1,024	−1.32%
1926	1,012	−0.24%
1931	1,030	+0.35%
1936	1,068	+0.73%
1946	1,006	−0.60%
1954	1,028	+0.27%
1962	1,242	+2.39%
1968	1,034	−3.01%
1975	1,276	+3.05%
1982	1,931	+6.10%
1990	2,728	+4.41%
1999	2,980	+0.99%
2007	3,652	+2.57%
2012	4,249	+3.07%
2017	4,221	−0.13%
2023	4,125	−0.38%

Source: EHESS and INSEE (1968-2023)

== Heraldry ==
Blason ville Brie

The coat of arms is the gold to three hovels contoured of sinople bound gules, to the gules with the flower of sunflower in the natural, gules to the natural tree, At the golden anchor loaded with a number of "515" of sand and the leaping gazelle of silver broaching.

In ancient times, the name of the town appears to have been Bria, in about 1110. According to Dauzat, the origin of the name Brie, like those of other communes of the same name in the region, would go back to the Gaulish briga meaning "height." But it is not obvious because the borough of Brie is not on a height. During the nineteenth and twentieth centuries, Brie was called informally Brie-la-Rochefoucauld, named after its canton, to distinguish it from other communes of the same name in Charente.

== Churches ==
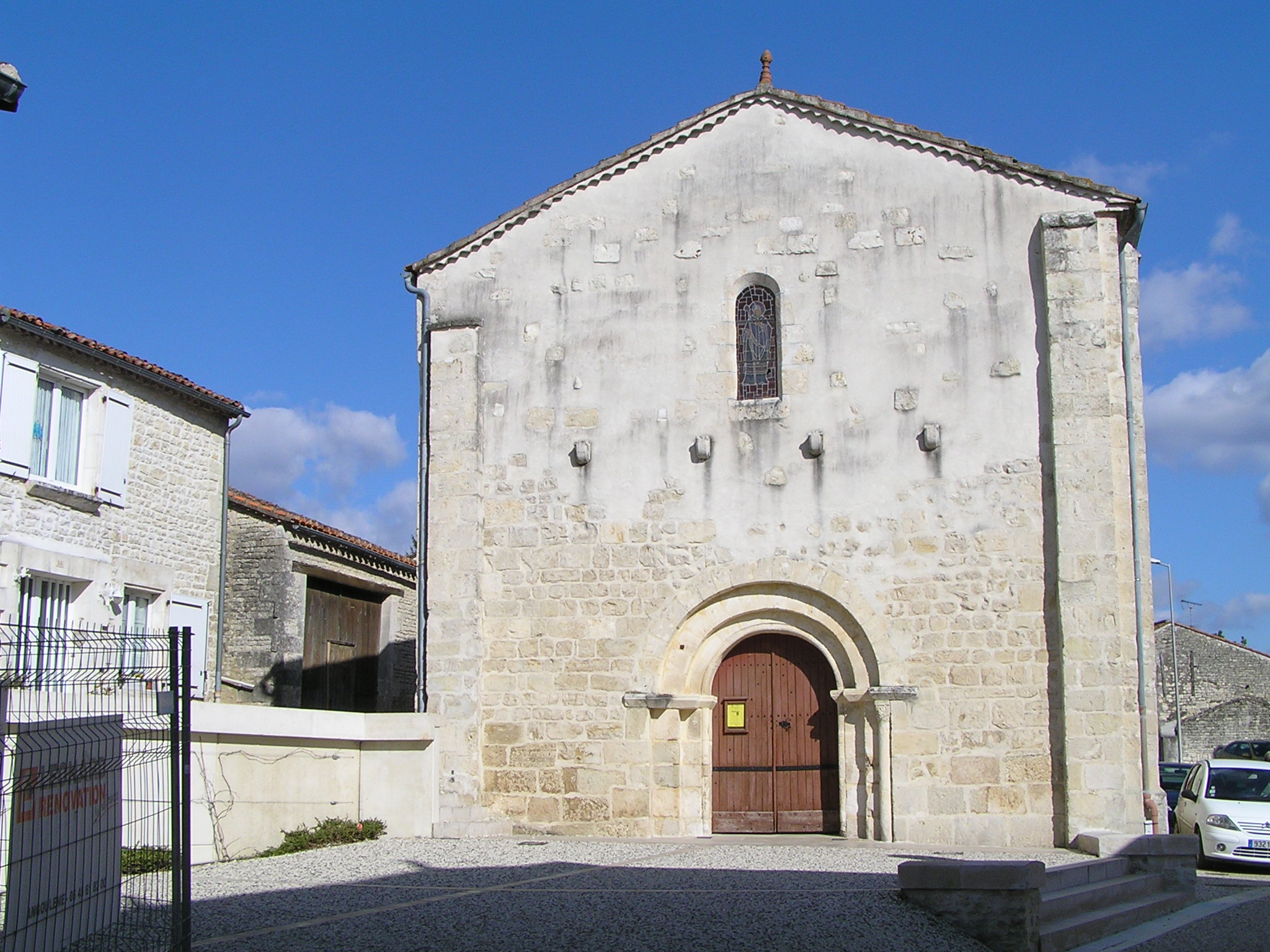
L'église Saint-Médard

The parish church of Saint-Médard dates from the 12th and 13th centuries. According to some it was attributed to the cathedral chapter of Angouleme, according to others it was a priory-cure of the abbey of Saint-Ausone. Two infants are located near the entrance to the south, one of which is decorated with scallops. The ceiling of the nave was redone in the second half of the nineteenth century. The church was restored in the years 2000.

The church of Saint-Médard is located in the village of Frauds; this neo-Gothic chapel was built in 1905 by a subscription and blessed in 1907. Two stained glass windows represent Saint Barbe, patron saint of the artillerymen, and Saint Hubert, patron saint of the hunters. It was sold in 2005 to an individual, who sometimes organizes exhibitions.

== See also ==
- Communes of the Charente department
