= Empuré =

- Commune
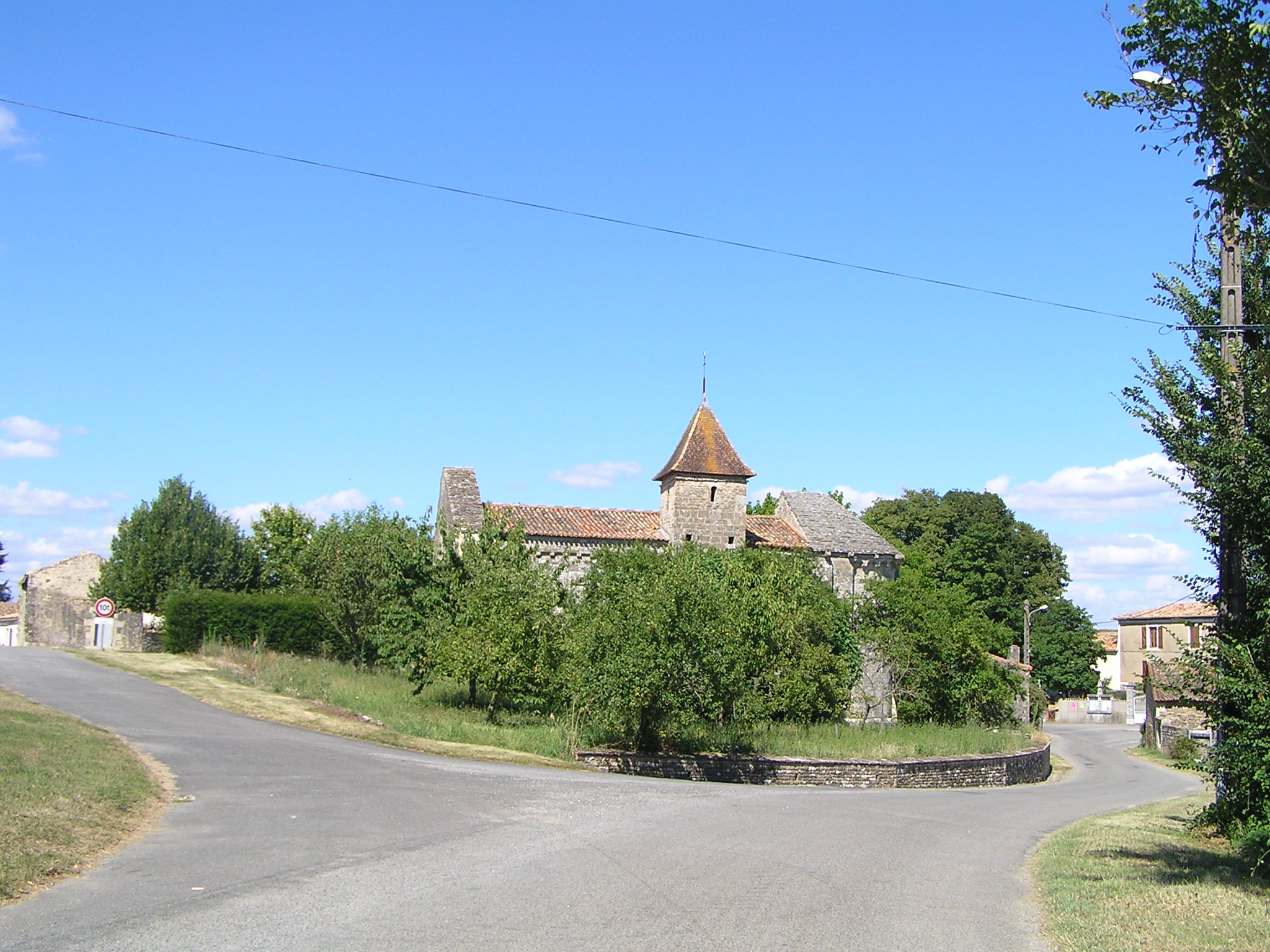
- The church and surroundings in Empuré
- Location of Empuré
- Location within France Location within Nouvelle-Aquitaine
- Coordinates: 46°01′25″N 0°03′09″E
- Country: France
- Region: Nouvelle-Aquitaine
- Department: Charente
- Arrondissement: Confolens
- Canton: Charente-Nord

Government
  - Mayor (2020–2026): Francis Marquet
- Area^{1}: 8.37 km^{2} (3.23 sq mi)
- Elevation: 100 m (330 ft)
- Highest elevation: 156 m (512 ft)
- Lowest elevation: 84 m (276 ft)
- Population (2023): 100
  - Density: 12/km^{2} (31/sq mi)
- Time zone: UTC+01:00 (CET)
  - Summer (DST): UTC+02:00 (CEST)
- INSEE/Postal code: 16127 /16240
- ^{1} French Land Register data, which excludes lakes, ponds, glaciers > 1 km^{2} (0.386 sq mi or 247 acres) and river estuaries.

Empuré (French pronunciation: [ɑ̃pyʁe]) is a commune in the Charente department in southwestern France.

Bounded on the west by the Fountaine de Frédières, a small tributary of the Aume, the town lies on a plateau, located 3 km northwest of Villefagnan and 13 km west of Ruffec. The main crop is cereals.

The main route is the D27 route which crosses the commune from the north-west to south-east, which passes near the town of Empuré. The communes contains the hamlets Planchard in the west bordering the commune of Paizay-Naudouin-Embourie, Le Pouyaud to the north of the town and Bellevue etc.

== Population ==
Historical population
Year	Pop.	±% p.a.
1968	151	—
1975	112	−4.18%
1982	112	+0.00%
1990	113	+0.11%
1999	108	−0.50%
2007	119	+1.22%
2012	113	−1.03%
2017	100	−2.41%
2023	100	+0.00%
Source: INSEE

== Sights ==
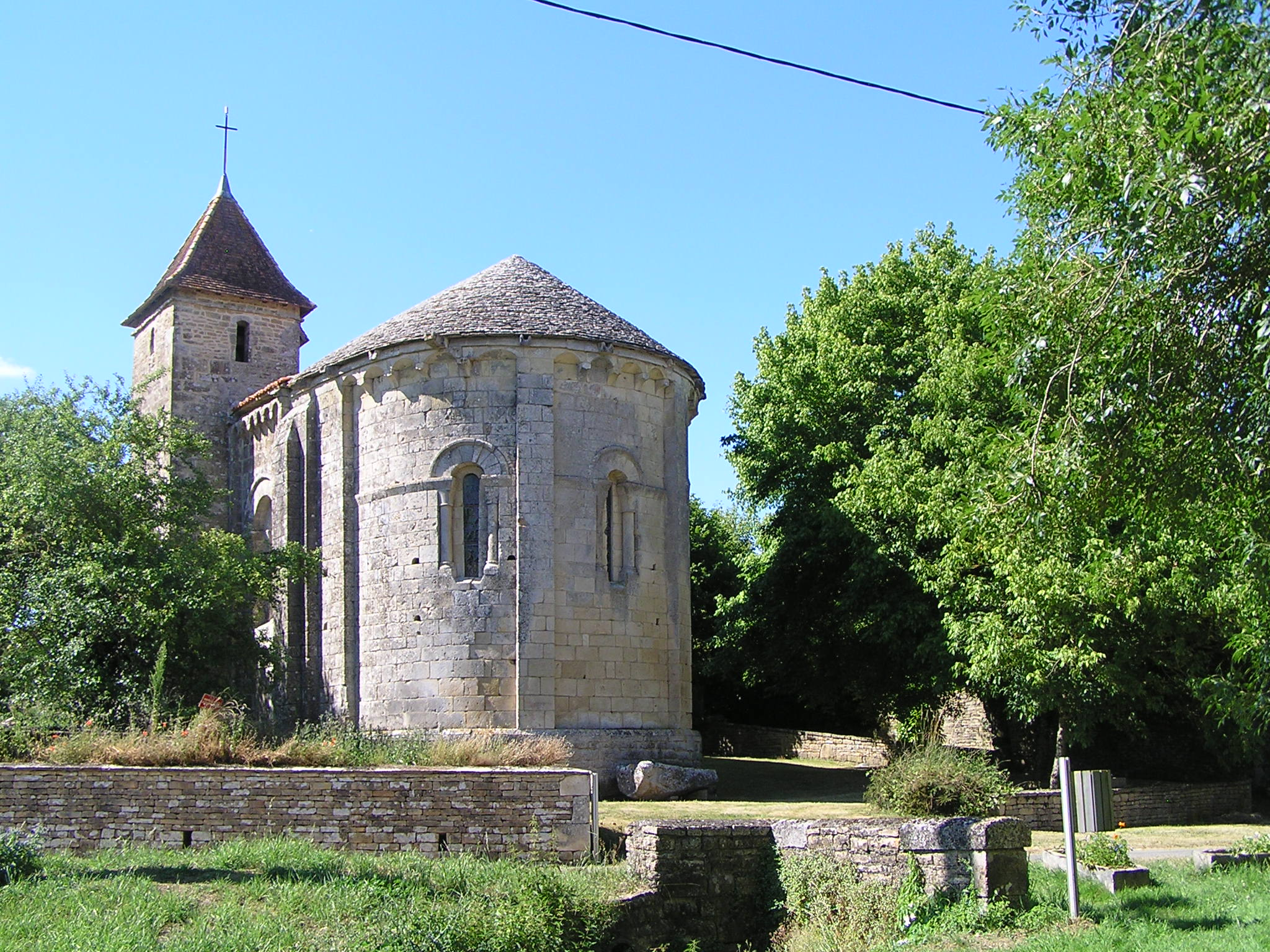
Saint-Maixent

Église Saint-Maixent, a remarkable building from the twelfth century is characterised by its arched gateway, and the symbolic corbels that adorn its façade. It was classified a historical monument on 9 May 1914.

There is also a chateau in the commune and a town hall, built in the 16th century.

== See also ==
- Communes of the Charente department
