= Tuzie =

- Part of Courcôme
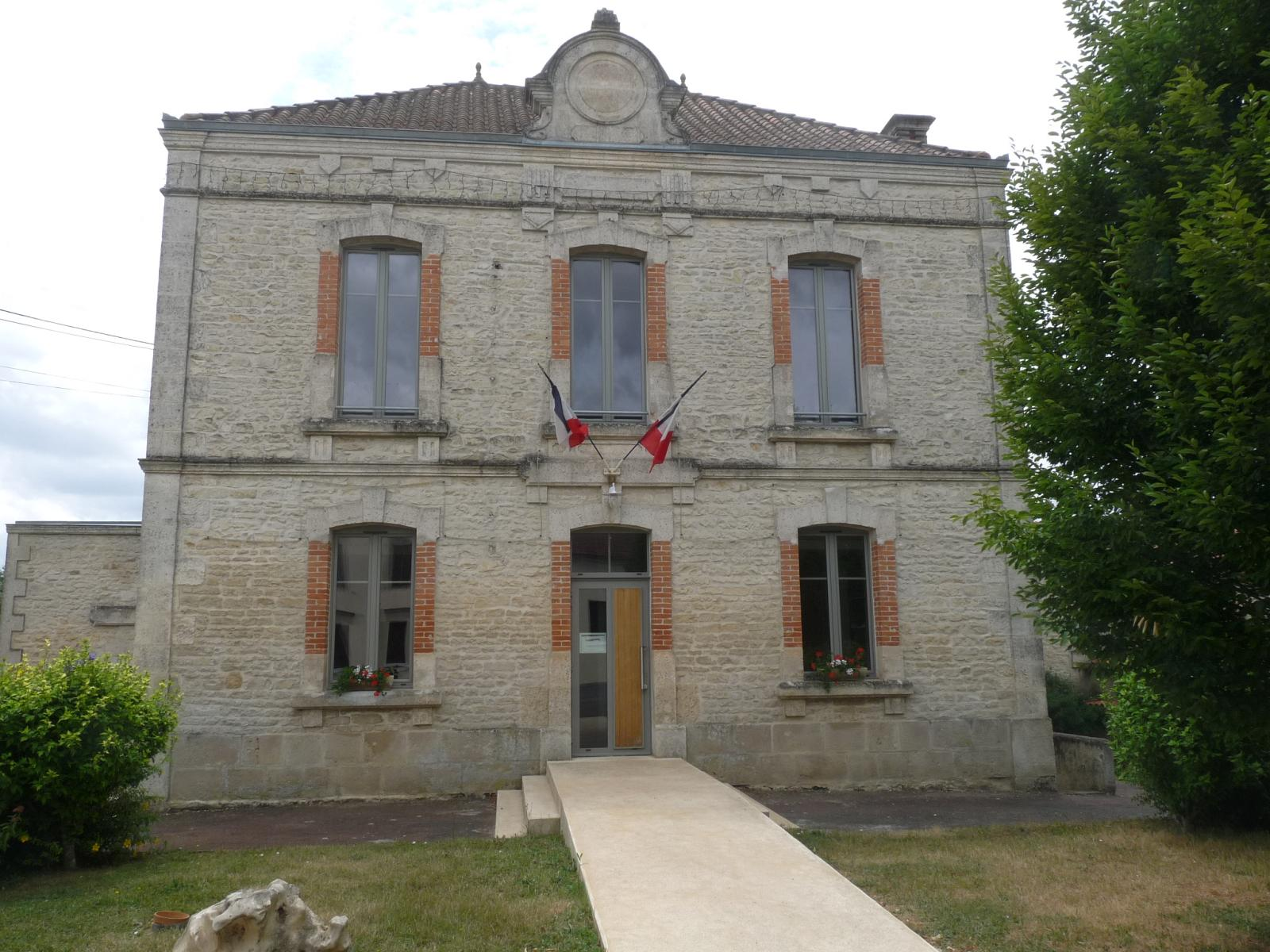
- Town hall
- Location of Tuzie
- Location within France Location within Nouvelle-Aquitaine
- Coordinates: 45°58′35″N 0°09′29″E
- Country: France
- Region: Nouvelle-Aquitaine
- Department: Charente
- Arrondissement: Confolens
- Canton: Charente-Nord
- Commune: Courcôme
- Area^{1}: 2.43 km^{2} (0.94 sq mi)
- Elevation: 130 m (430 ft)
- Highest elevation: 136 m (446 ft)
- Lowest elevation: 76 m (249 ft)
- Population (2023): 173
  - Density: 71.2/km^{2} (184/sq mi)
- Time zone: UTC+01:00 (CET)
  - Summer (DST): UTC+02:00 (CEST)
- Postal code: 16700
- ^{1} French Land Register data, which excludes lakes, ponds, glaciers > 1 km^{2} (0.386 sq mi or 247 acres) and river estuaries.

Tuzie (French pronunciation: [tyzi]) is a former commune in the Charente department in southwestern France. On 1 January 2019 it was merged into the commune Courcôme.

== See also ==
- Communes of the Charente department
