= Salles-de-Villefagnan =

- Commune
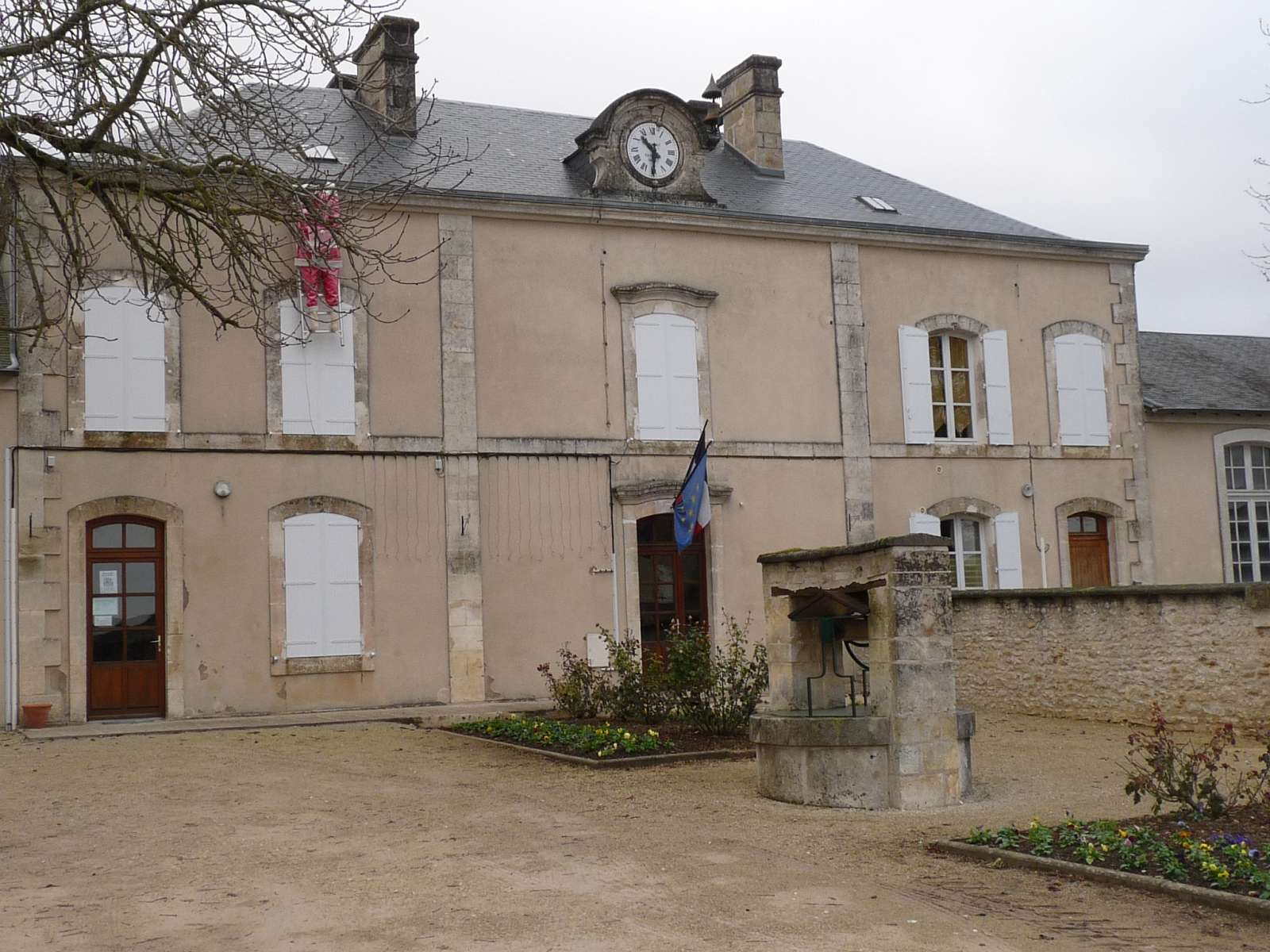
- Town hall

- Coat of arms
- Location of Salles-de-Villefagnan
- Location within France Location within Nouvelle-Aquitaine
- Coordinates: 45°57′35″N 0°09′46″E
- Country: France
- Region: Nouvelle-Aquitaine
- Department: Charente
- Arrondissement: Confolens
- Canton: Charente-Nord

Government
  - Mayor (2020–2026): Gérard Sorton
- Area^{1}: 12.83 km^{2} (4.95 sq mi)
- Elevation: 124 m (407 ft)
- Highest elevation: 132 m (433 ft)
- Lowest elevation: 69 m (226 ft)
- Population (2023): 313
  - Density: 24.4/km^{2} (63.2/sq mi)
- Time zone: UTC+01:00 (CET)
  - Summer (DST): UTC+02:00 (CEST)
- INSEE/Postal code: 16361 /16700
- ^{1} French Land Register data, which excludes lakes, ponds, glaciers > 1 km^{2} (0.386 sq mi or 247 acres) and river estuaries.

Salles-de-Villefagnan (French pronunciation: [sal də vilfaɲɑ̃], literally Salles of Villefagnan) is a commune in the Charente department in southwestern France.

== Population ==
Historical population
Year	Pop.	±% p.a.
1968	412	—
1975	368	−1.60%
1982	365	−0.12%
1990	327	−1.36%
1999	325	−0.07%
2007	334	+0.34%
2012	348	+0.82%
2017	323	−1.48%
2023	313	−0.52%
Source: INSEE

== See also ==
- Communes of the Charente department
