= Bessé =

- Commune
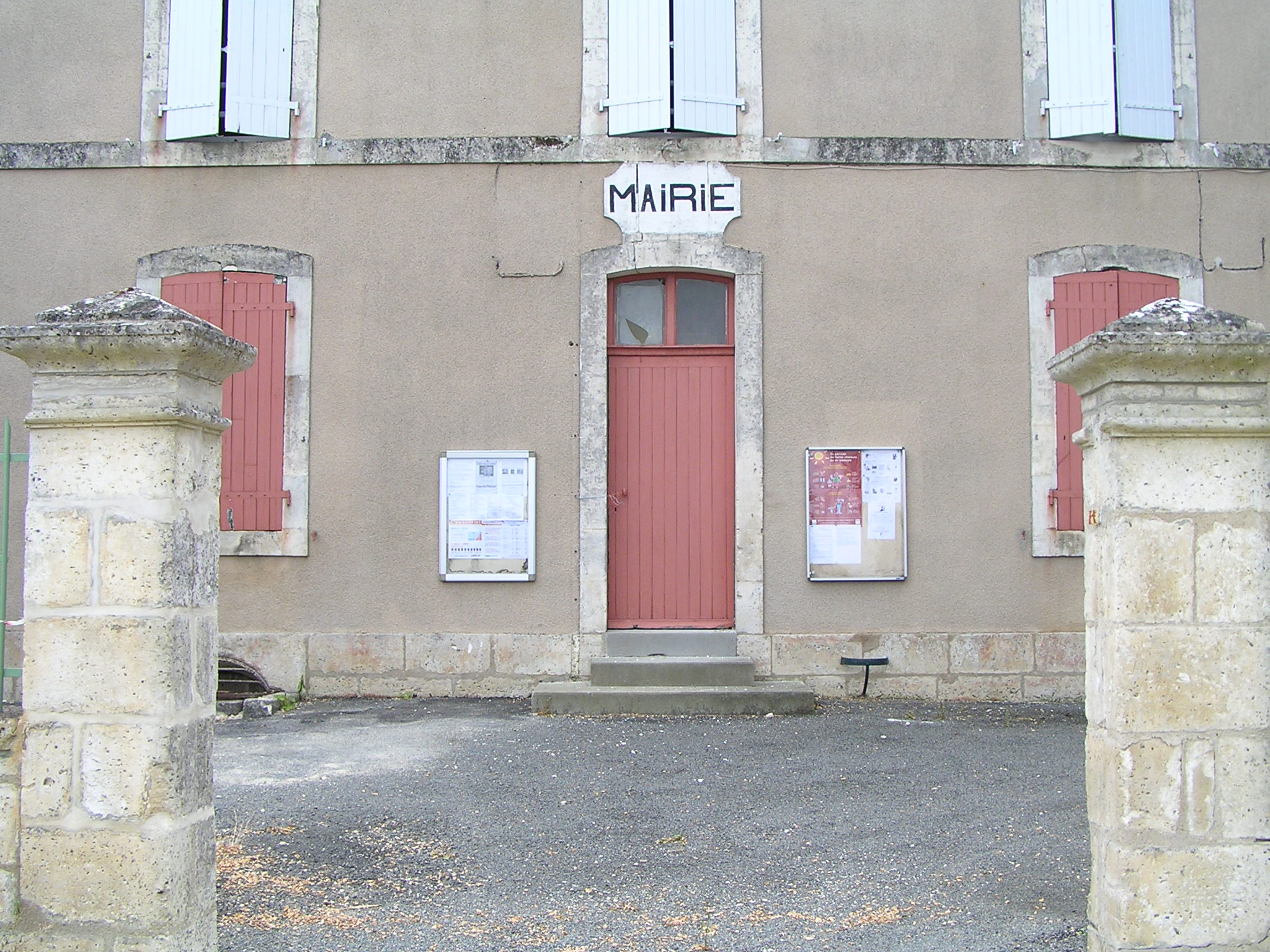
- Town hall
- Location of Bessé
- Location within France Location within Nouvelle-Aquitaine
- Coordinates: 45°57′22″N 0°04′28″E
- Country: France
- Region: Nouvelle-Aquitaine
- Department: Charente
- Arrondissement: Confolens
- Canton: Charente-Nord

Government
  - Mayor (2020–2026): Jackie Lizot
- Area^{1}: 7.67 km^{2} (2.96 sq mi)
- Elevation: 111 m (364 ft)
- Highest elevation: 131 m (430 ft)
- Lowest elevation: 84 m (276 ft)
- Population (2023): 120
  - Density: 16/km^{2} (41/sq mi)
- Time zone: UTC+01:00 (CET)
  - Summer (DST): UTC+02:00 (CEST)
- INSEE/Postal code: 16042 /16140
- ^{1} French Land Register data, which excludes lakes, ponds, glaciers > 1 km^{2} (0.386 sq mi or 247 acres) and river estuaries.

Bessé is a commune in the Charente department in southwestern France.

== Population ==
Historical population
Year	Pop.	±% p.a.
1968	169	—
1975	137	−2.95%
1982	116	−2.35%
1990	132	+1.63%
1999	152	+1.58%
2007	150	−0.17%
2012	141	−1.23%
2017	121	−3.01%
2023	120	−0.14%
Source: INSEE

The inhabitants of Bessé are called Besséens in French.

== See also ==
- Communes of the Charente department
