= Abbey of Saint-Ausone =

Abbey in Charente, France

Coordinates: 45.65°N 0.145°E

The abbey of Saint-Ausone is a Benedictine abbey founded in Angouleme in the Charente in the 11th century.

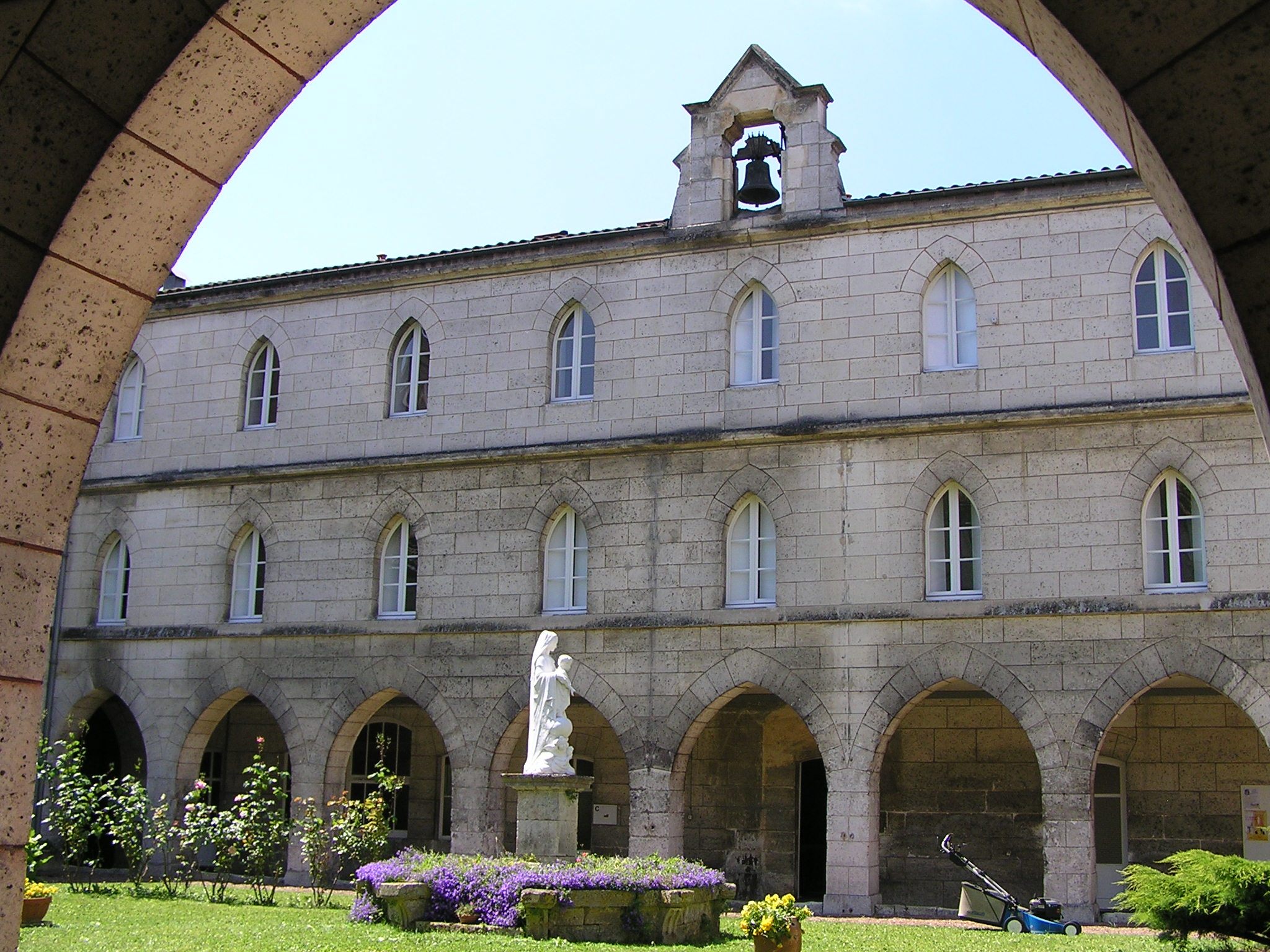
Cloître at Saint-Ausone

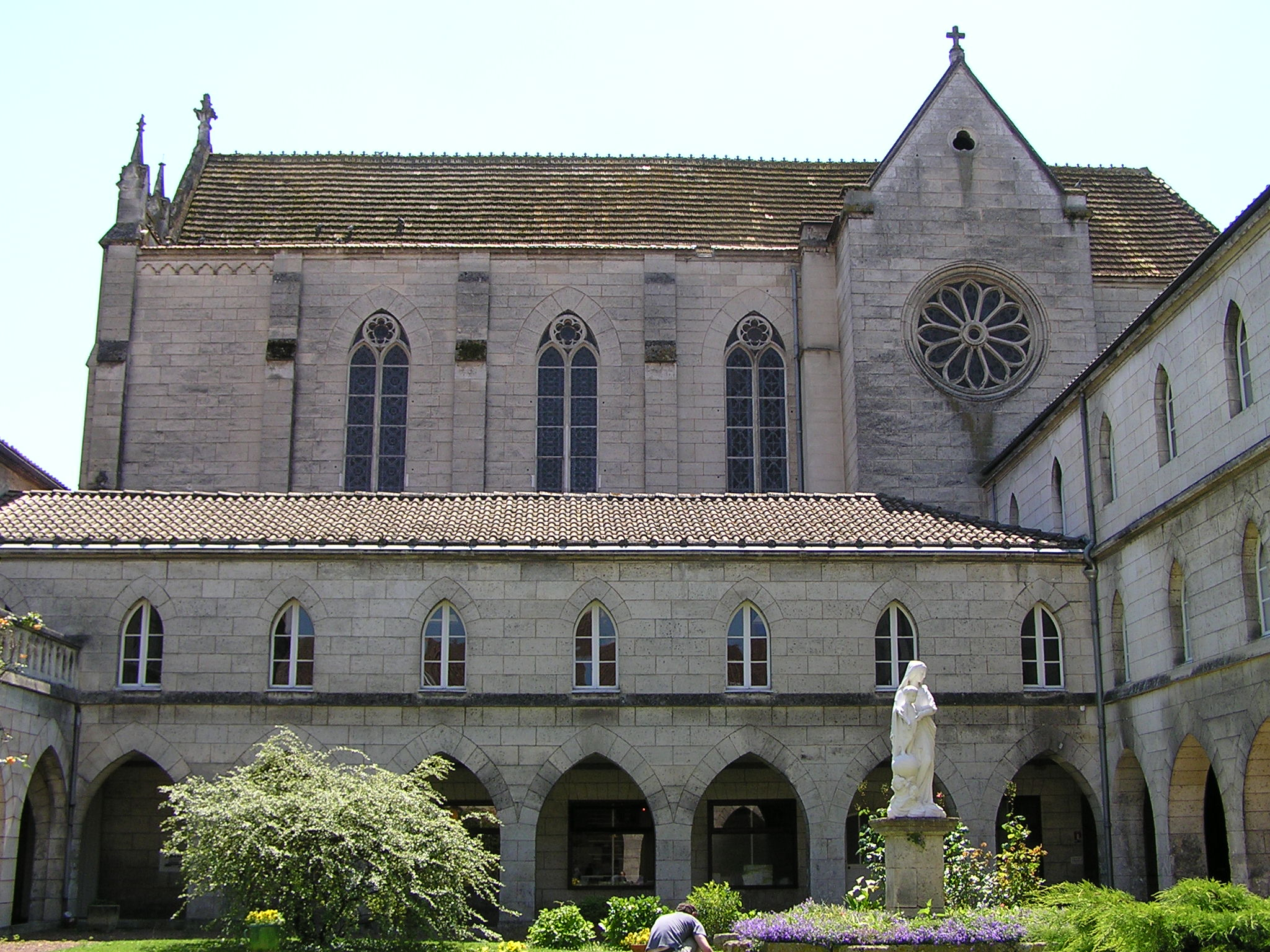
Autre côté du cloître

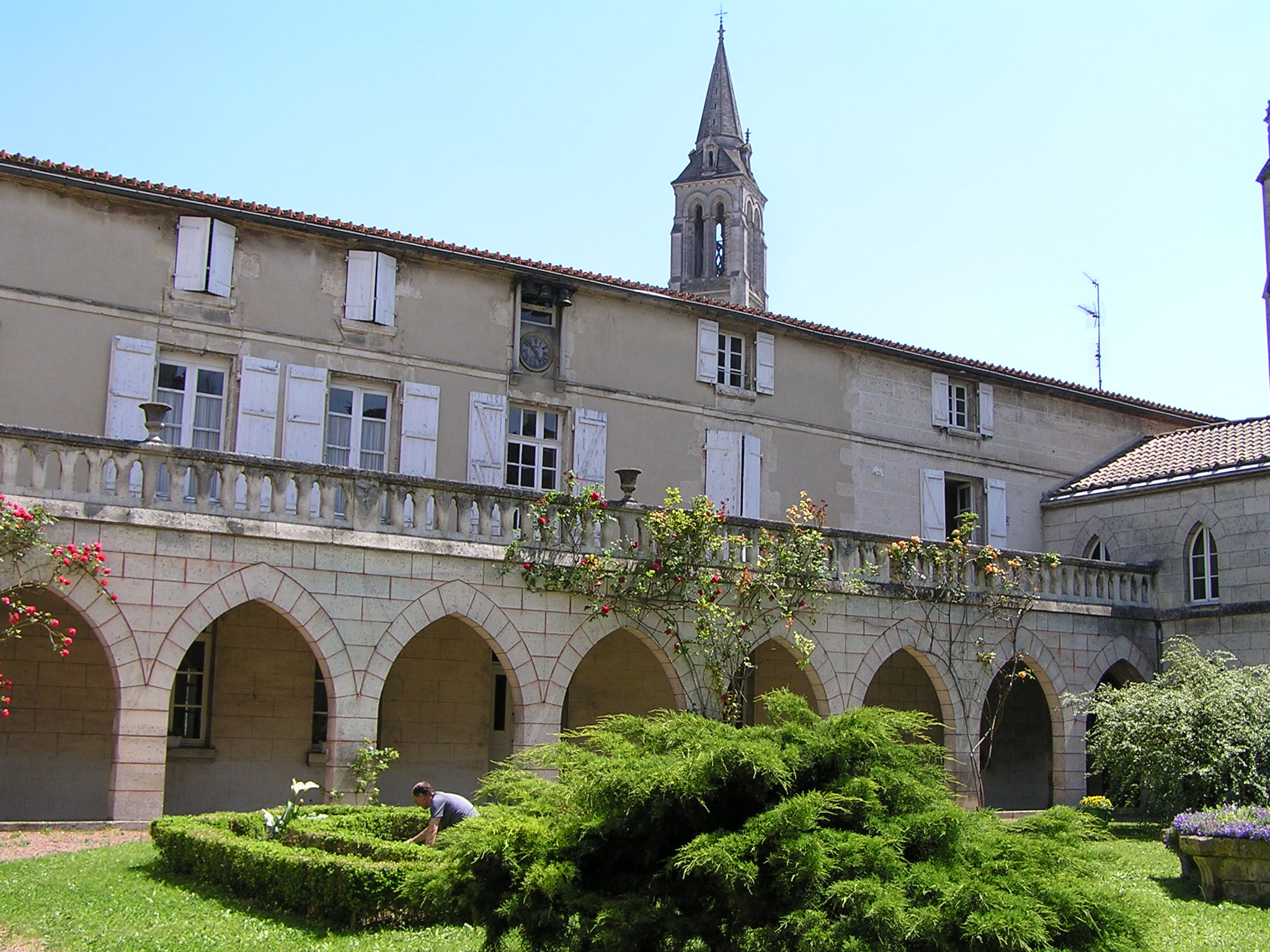
Clocher de l'église qui est près des remparts

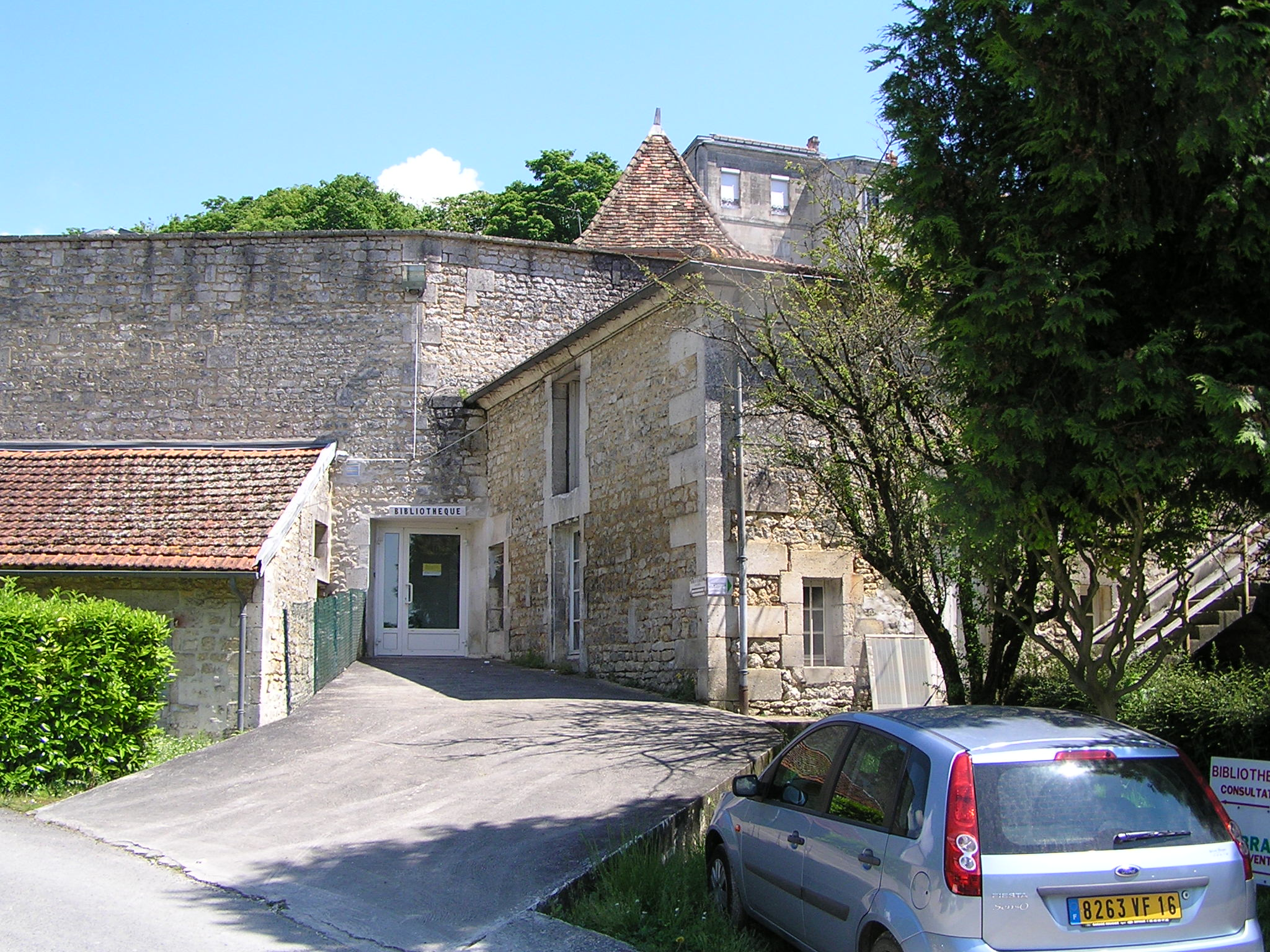
Bibliothèque et toit du pigeonnier

== History of the Abbey ==
Ausone would have been the first bishop of Angouleme. His burial would be on the edge of the city at the site where the Benedictine abbey of women took place.

== Foundation of the Abbey ==
It is placed under the aegis of St Ausone and its term "Sepultus in confinio urbis, in occidental parte."

The ladies of Saint Ausona kept their monastery of Saint Calfagia, contemporary of Saint Ausonius, the first bishop of Angouleme. The monastery was created at the bottom of the ramparts, near the tomb of Saint Ausone.

== Evolution of status ==
It is a Benedictine abbey of women. In memory of Saint Ausone the entrance of the bishops in Angoulême was done in procession of the monastery of Saint-Ausone until the cathedral.

The illegitimate daughter of Charles d'Orléans, Madeleine was abbess of 1476 to 1543.

== Loss of Religious Function ==
In 1792 (following the French Revolution), the church and the Abbey of the Benedictines were disused and transformed into a prison. The buildings were used for a Central School which then became a college and then a high school. In 1844, it was decided to shave everything to rebuild a new high school and better adapted to the plans of the architect Paul Abadie snr. The present chapel was built between 1862 and 1867 by Paul Abadie Jr on the site of the parish church of the late 18th century.

Before the reconstruction of the church of Saint-Ausone in 1864 excavations took place which allowed the discovery of sarcophagi. Today There's nothing left of the Monastic buildings The parish church was rebuilt on the site of the abbey. Located below and outside the ramparts, it forms with the archive one of the buildings of the archbishopric. They also include a cloister and numerous annexes including a dovecote.

== Abbots ==
- 11??-1152 : Sainte Caléfagie
- 1152-1222 : Alix I
- 1222-1225 : Agnès I de Pons
- 1225-1260 : Agnès II de Chambon
- 1260-1261 : Marguerite I de Mixe de Luxe
- 1261-1284 : Guillemette de Villars
- 1285-1306 : Isabelle I
- 1307-1311 : Gillette
- 1311-1312 : Barthélémie I
- 1312-1324 : Alix II de Lusignan de La Marche
- 1324-1332 : Pétronille I de La Caille
- 1333-1338 : Isabelle II du Tison d’Argence
- 1338-1370 : Barthélémie II Geoffroide de Saint-Amand
- 1370-1383 : Aude
- 1384-1392 : Agnès III
- 1393-1395 : Jeanne I
- 1395-1448 : Agnès IV de Montferrand
- 1449-1453 : Marguerite II de Ragos
- 1454-1461 : Marguerite III des Aigues
- 1461-1489 : Marguerite IV de Gaing
- 1489-1490 : Pétronille II de Gaing
- 1490-1519 : Madeleine de Valois-Orléans-Angouleme
- 1519-1533 : Renée Guibert
- 1533-1550 : Marie Paulmier
- 1550-1585 : Barbe de Saint-Gelais de Lusignan de Lansac
- 1585-1587 : Anne d’Arnaud de Chalonne
- 1587-1654 : Luce de Montmorency-Bouteville de Luxe
- 1654-1682 : Charlotte-Catherine d’Aure de Gramont
- 1682-1686 : Angélique d’Espinay de Lignery
- 1686-1711 : Jeanne II de Villelume du Bastiment
- 1711-1747 : Françoise-Gabrielle de Valois-Orléans-Rothelin
- 1747-1759 : Jeanne II Elisabeth-Thérèse de Pérusse des Cars de La Renaudie
- 1759-1766 : Gabrielle-Marthe de Pérusse des Cars de La Renaudie
- 1766-1793 : Marie-Françoise de Durfort de Civrac
