= Esse, Charente =

Esse
- Commune
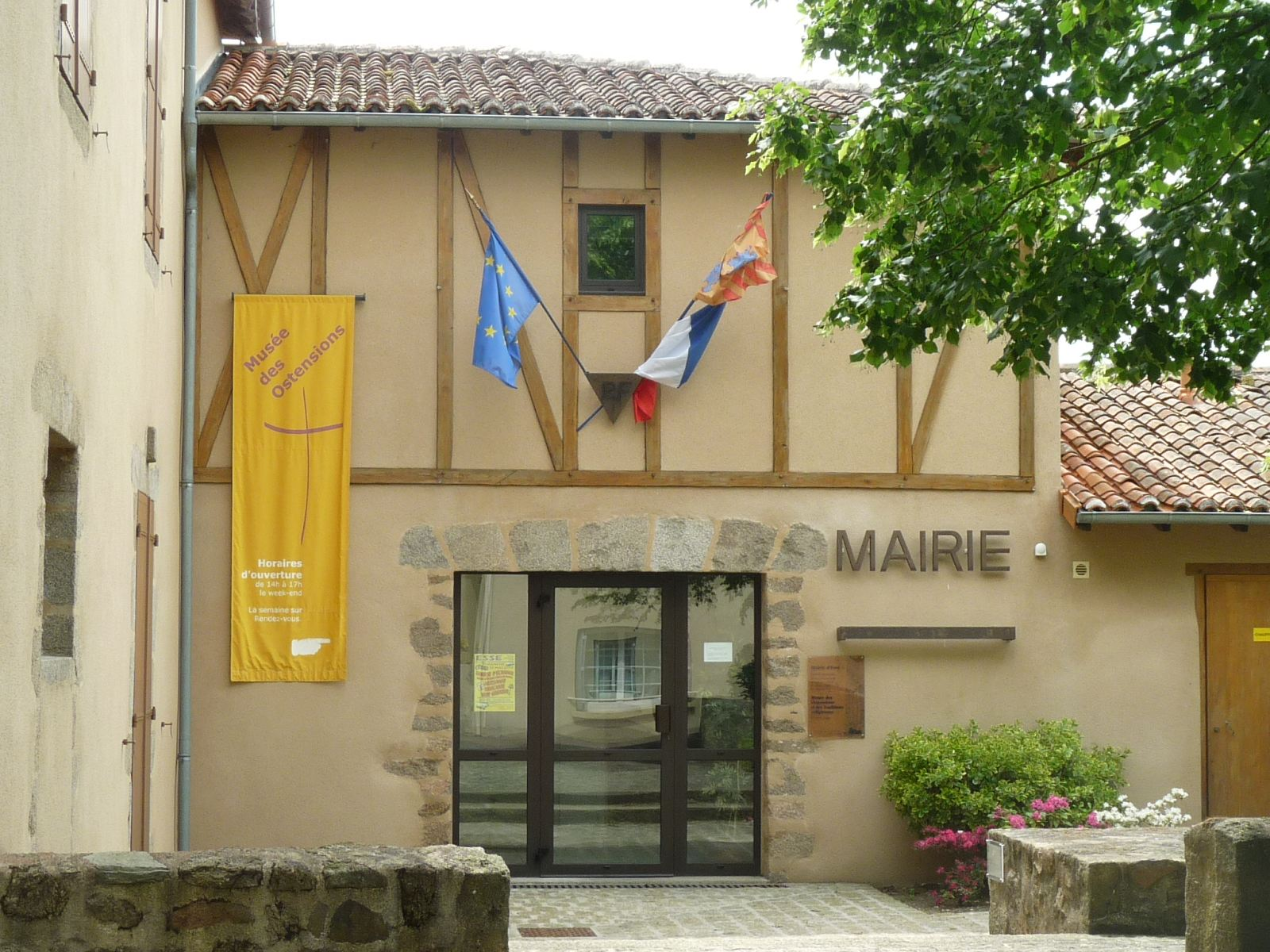
- Town hall and museum
- Location of Esse
- Location within France Location within Nouvelle-Aquitaine
- Coordinates: 46°02′00″N 0°43′20″E
- Country: France
- Region: Nouvelle-Aquitaine
- Department: Charente
- Arrondissement: Confolens
- Canton: Charente-Vienne

Government
  - Mayor (2020–2026): Roland Fourgeaud
- Area^{1}: 30.37 km^{2} (11.73 sq mi)
- Elevation: 240 m (790 ft)
- Highest elevation: 242 m (794 ft)
- Lowest elevation: 124 m (407 ft)
- Population (2023): 518
  - Density: 17.1/km^{2} (44.2/sq mi)
- Time zone: UTC+01:00 (CET)
  - Summer (DST): UTC+02:00 (CEST)
- INSEE/Postal code: 16131 /16500
- ^{1} French Land Register data, which excludes lakes, ponds, glaciers > 1 km^{2} (0.386 sq mi or 247 acres) and river estuaries.

Esse (French pronunciation: [ɛs]; Occitan: Essa) is a commune in the Charente department in southwestern France.

== Population ==
Historical population
Year	Pop.	±% p.a.
1968	473	—
1975	427	−1.45%
1982	466	+1.26%
1990	503	+0.96%
1999	497	−0.13%
2007	503	+0.15%
2012	500	−0.12%
2017	498	−0.08%
2023	518	+0.66%
Source: INSEE

== See also ==
- Communes of the Charente department
