= Ronsenac =

- Commune
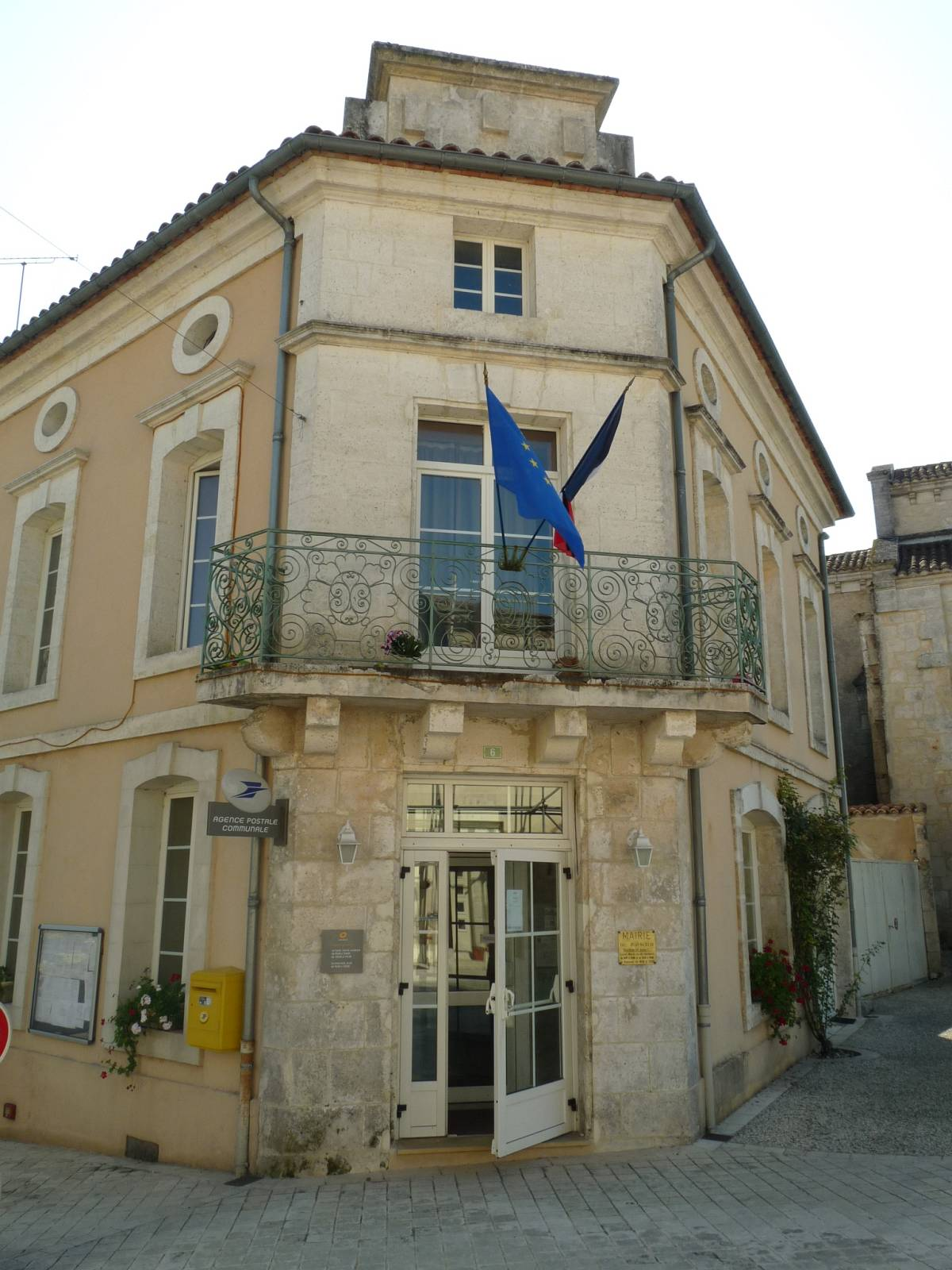
- Town hall
- Location of Ronsenac
- Location within France Location within Nouvelle-Aquitaine
- Coordinates: 45°28′38″N 0°15′03″E
- Country: France
- Region: Nouvelle-Aquitaine
- Department: Charente
- Arrondissement: Angoulême
- Canton: Tude-et-Lavalette
- Intercommunality: Lavalette Tude Dronne

Government
  - Mayor (2020–2026): Marie-France Deschamps
- Area^{1}: 26.73 km^{2} (10.32 sq mi)
- Elevation: 109 m (358 ft)
- Highest elevation: 204 m (669 ft)
- Lowest elevation: 80 m (260 ft)
- Population (2023): 571
  - Density: 21.4/km^{2} (55.3/sq mi)
- Time zone: UTC+01:00 (CET)
  - Summer (DST): UTC+02:00 (CEST)
- INSEE/Postal code: 16283 /16320
- ^{1} French Land Register data, which excludes lakes, ponds, glaciers > 1 km^{2} (0.386 sq mi or 247 acres) and river estuaries.

Ronsenac (French pronunciation: [ʁɔ̃snak]) is a commune in the Charente department in southwestern France.

== Population ==
Historical population
Year	Pop.	±% p.a.
1968	506	—
1975	470	−1.05%
1982	515	+1.31%
1990	526	+0.26%
1999	548	+0.46%
2007	548	+0.00%
2012	584	+1.28%
2017	571	−0.45%
2023	571	+0.00%
Source: INSEE

== See also ==
- Communes of the Charente department
