= Luxé =

- Commune
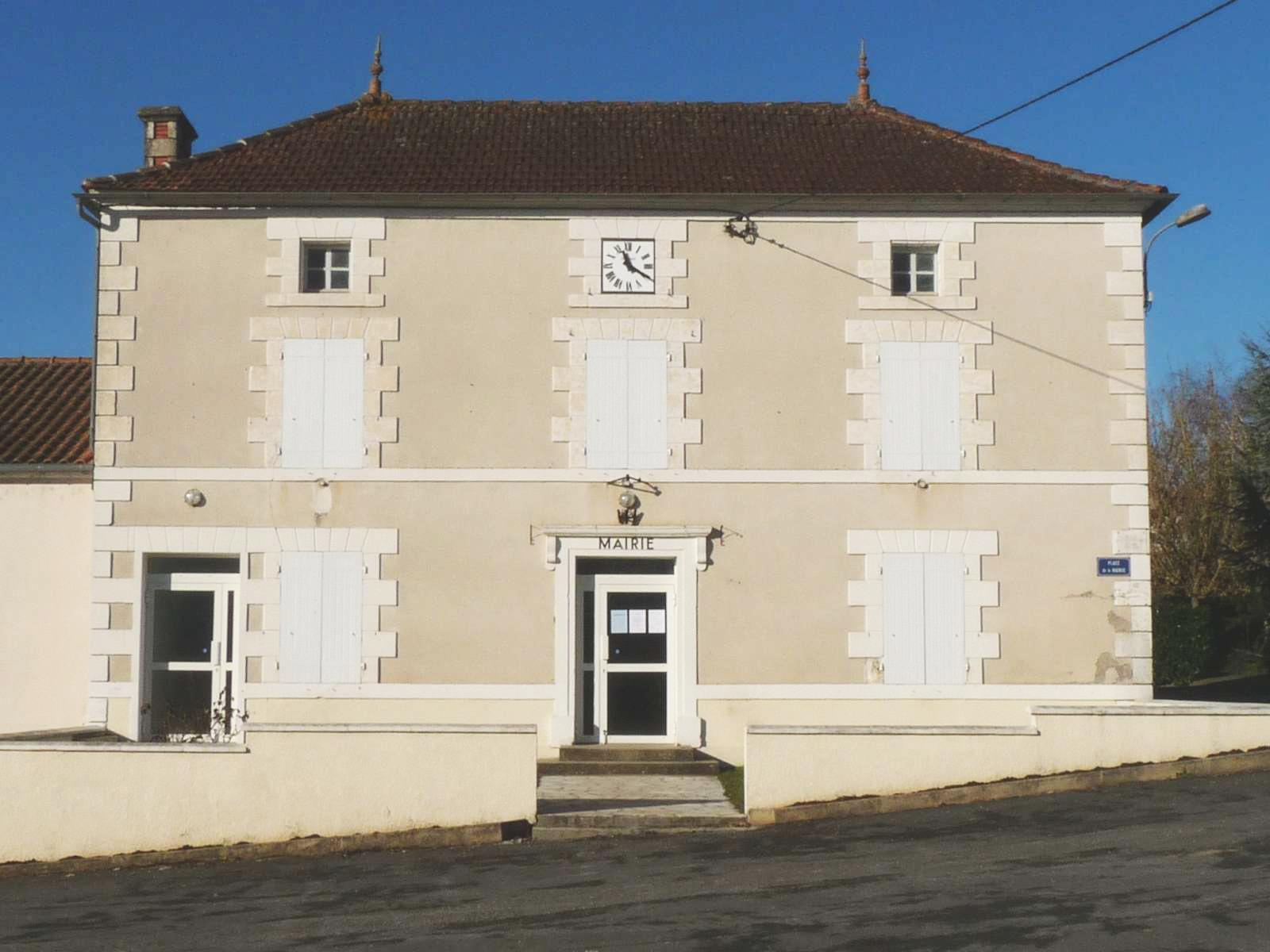
- Town hall
- Location of Luxé
- Location within France Location within Nouvelle-Aquitaine
- Coordinates: 45°53′37″N 0°07′01″E
- Country: France
- Region: Nouvelle-Aquitaine
- Department: Charente
- Arrondissement: Confolens
- Canton: Boixe-et-Manslois
- Intercommunality: Cœur de Charente

Government
  - Mayor (2022–2026): Veronique Lamaziere
- Area^{1}: 12.17 km^{2} (4.70 sq mi)
- Elevation: 61 m (200 ft)
- Highest elevation: 98 m (322 ft)
- Lowest elevation: 52 m (171 ft)
- Population (2023): 748
  - Density: 61.5/km^{2} (159/sq mi)
- Time zone: UTC+01:00 (CET)
  - Summer (DST): UTC+02:00 (CEST)
- INSEE/Postal code: 16196 /16230
- ^{1} French Land Register data, which excludes lakes, ponds, glaciers > 1 km^{2} (0.386 sq mi or 247 acres) and river estuaries.

Luxé (French pronunciation: [lykse]) is a commune in the Charente department in southwestern France.

== Population ==
Historical population
Year	Pop.	±% p.a.
1968	777	—
1975	710	−1.28%
1982	751	+0.81%
1990	733	−0.30%
1999	756	+0.34%
2007	787	+0.50%
2012	755	−0.83%
2017	723	−0.86%
2023	748	+0.57%
Source: INSEE

== See also ==
- Communes of the Charente department
