= Charras =

- Commune
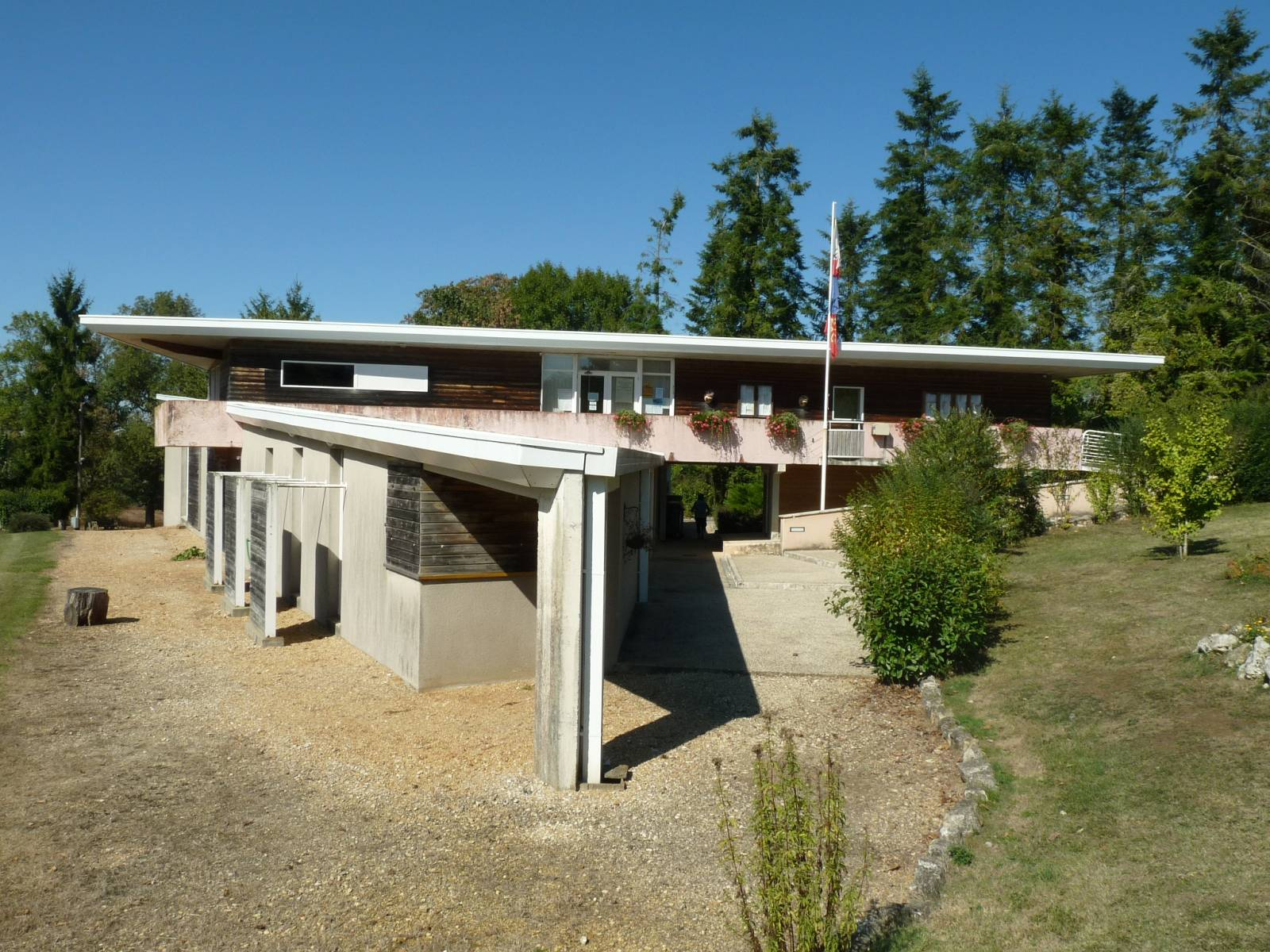
- The town hall in Charras

- Coat of arms
- Location of Charras
- Location within France Location within Nouvelle-Aquitaine
- Coordinates: 45°32′36″N 0°25′01″E
- Country: France
- Region: Nouvelle-Aquitaine
- Department: Charente
- Arrondissement: Angoulême
- Canton: Val de Tardoire

Government
  - Mayor (2020–2026): Sandrine Picard
- Area^{1}: 15.12 km^{2} (5.84 sq mi)
- Elevation: 190 m (620 ft)
- Highest elevation: 202 m (663 ft)
- Lowest elevation: 125 m (410 ft)
- Population (2023): 346
  - Density: 22.9/km^{2} (59.3/sq mi)
- Time zone: UTC+01:00 (CET)
  - Summer (DST): UTC+02:00 (CEST)
- INSEE/Postal code: 16084 /16380
- ^{1} French Land Register data, which excludes lakes, ponds, glaciers > 1 km^{2} (0.386 sq mi or 247 acres) and river estuaries.

Charras (French pronunciation: [ʃaʁa]) is a commune in the Charente department in southwestern France.

== Population ==
Historical population
Year	Pop.	±% p.a.
1968	336	—
1975	324	−0.52%
1982	339	+0.65%
1990	328	−0.41%
1999	298	−1.06%
2007	319	+0.85%
2012	379	+3.51%
2017	337	−2.32%
2023	346	+0.44%
Source: INSEE

== See also ==
- Communes of the Charente department
