= Tusson =

- Commune
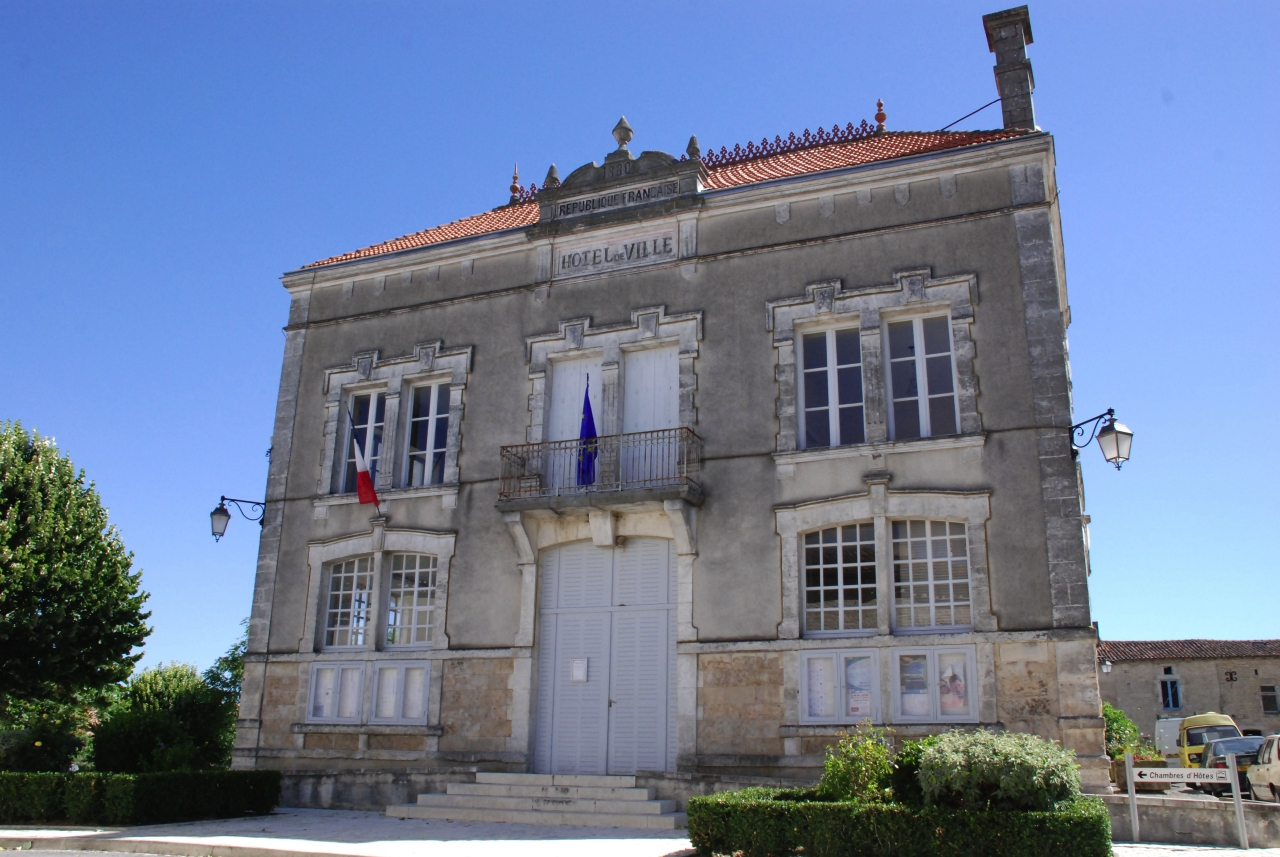
- Town hall

- Coat of arms
- Location of Tusson
- Location within France Location within Nouvelle-Aquitaine
- Coordinates: 45°56′06″N 0°04′09″E
- Country: France
- Region: Nouvelle-Aquitaine
- Department: Charente
- Arrondissement: Confolens
- Canton: Charente-Nord
- Intercommunality: Cœur de Charente

Government
  - Mayor (2020–2026): Éric Bouchet
- Area^{1}: 13.97 km^{2} (5.39 sq mi)
- Elevation: 98 m (322 ft)
- Highest elevation: 148 m (486 ft)
- Lowest elevation: 72 m (236 ft)
- Population (2023): 240
  - Density: 17/km^{2} (44/sq mi)
- Time zone: UTC+01:00 (CET)
  - Summer (DST): UTC+02:00 (CEST)
- INSEE/Postal code: 16390 /16140
- ^{1} French Land Register data, which excludes lakes, ponds, glaciers > 1 km^{2} (0.386 sq mi or 247 acres) and river estuaries.

Tusson (French pronunciation: [tysɔ̃]) is a commune in the Charente department in southwestern France.

It is the site of four large Neolithic tumuli, known as the Gros Dognon, the Petit Dognon, the Vieux Breuil and La Justice. Marguerite de Navarre spent time in the priory in the village, built by Robert d'Abrissel in the 12th century as an offshoot of the Abbey of Fontevraud. The village grew up subsequently around the religious establishment.

Until the 1960s it used to be a centre for the trading of horses and donkeys. Nowadays it is known for its artists and craftspeople, as well as its well-preserved historical buildings, many renovated with the participation of the Club Marpen, a local heritage group.

== Population ==
Historical population
Year	Pop.	±% p.a.
1968	441	—
1975	413	−0.93%
1982	389	−0.85%
1990	349	−1.35%
1999	317	−1.06%
2007	298	−0.77%
2012	239	−4.32%
2017	221	−1.55%
2023	240	+1.38%
Source: INSEE

== See also ==
- Communes of the Charente department
