= Courcôme =

- Commune
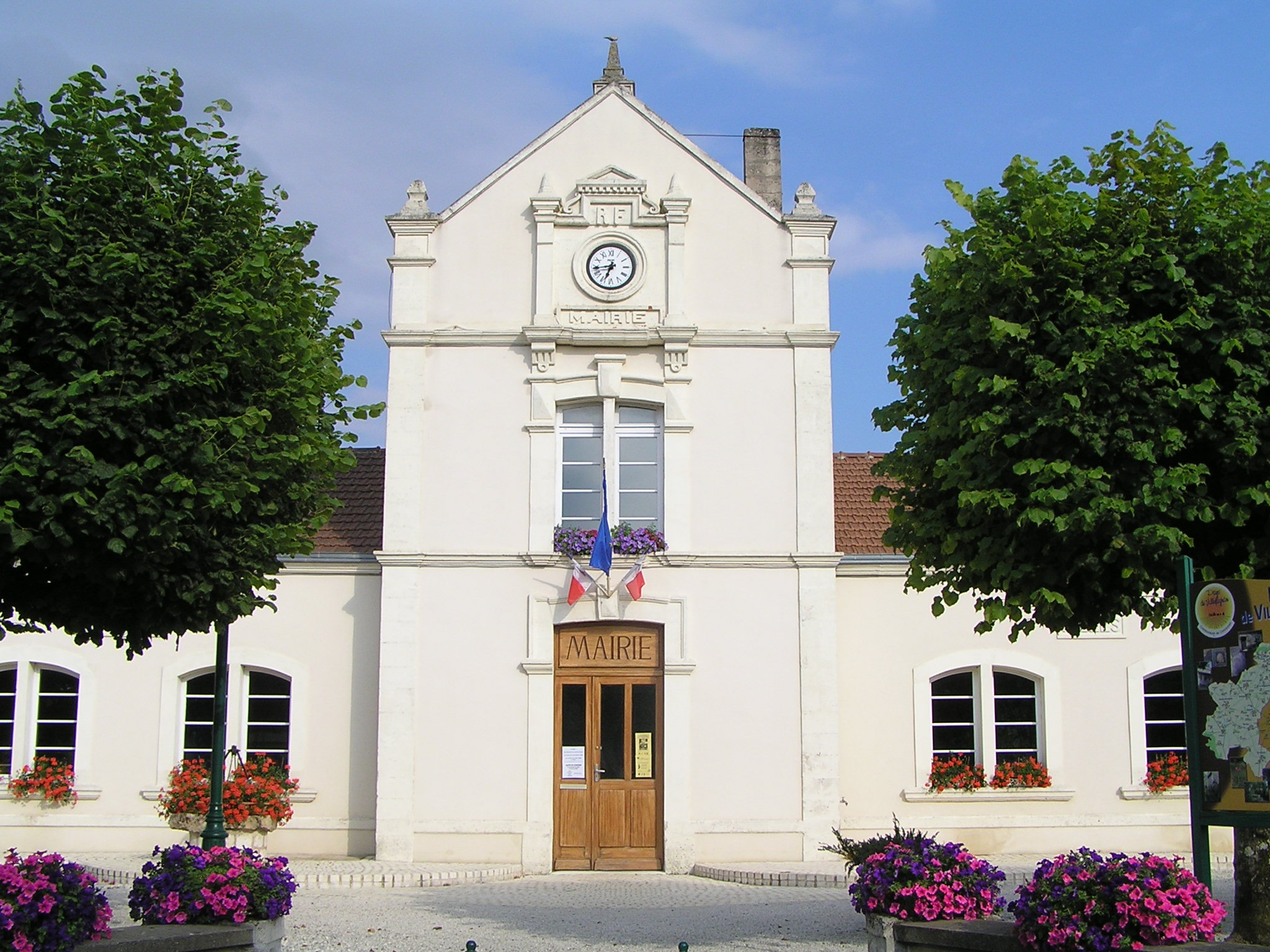
- Town hall
- Location of Courcôme
- Location within France Location within Nouvelle-Aquitaine
- Coordinates: 45°59′11″N 0°07′57″E
- Country: France
- Region: Nouvelle-Aquitaine
- Department: Charente
- Arrondissement: Confolens
- Canton: Charente-Nord
- Intercommunality: Val de Charente

Government
  - Mayor (2020–2026): Fabrice Geoffroy
- Area^{1}: 29.58 km^{2} (11.42 sq mi)
- Elevation: 99 m (325 ft)
- Highest elevation: 153 m (502 ft)
- Lowest elevation: 77 m (253 ft)
- Population (2023): 814
  - Density: 27.5/km^{2} (71.3/sq mi)
- Time zone: UTC+01:00 (CET)
  - Summer (DST): UTC+02:00 (CEST)
- INSEE/Postal code: 16110 /16240
- ^{1} French Land Register data, which excludes lakes, ponds, glaciers > 1 km^{2} (0.386 sq mi or 247 acres) and river estuaries.

Courcôme (French pronunciation: [kuʁkom]) is a commune in the Charente department in southwestern France. On 1 January 2019, the former communes of Tuzie and Villegats were merged into Courcôme.

== Population ==
Historical population
Year	Pop.	±% p.a.
1968	797	—
1975	714	−1.56%
1982	759	+0.88%
1990	749	−0.17%
1999	805	+0.80%
2007	813	+0.12%
2012	818	+0.12%
2017	792	−0.64%
2023	814	+0.46%
Source: INSEE

The population data in this table reflect the geography of the commune as of January 2025.

== See also ==
- Communes of the Charente department
