= Manot, Charente =

Manot
- Commune
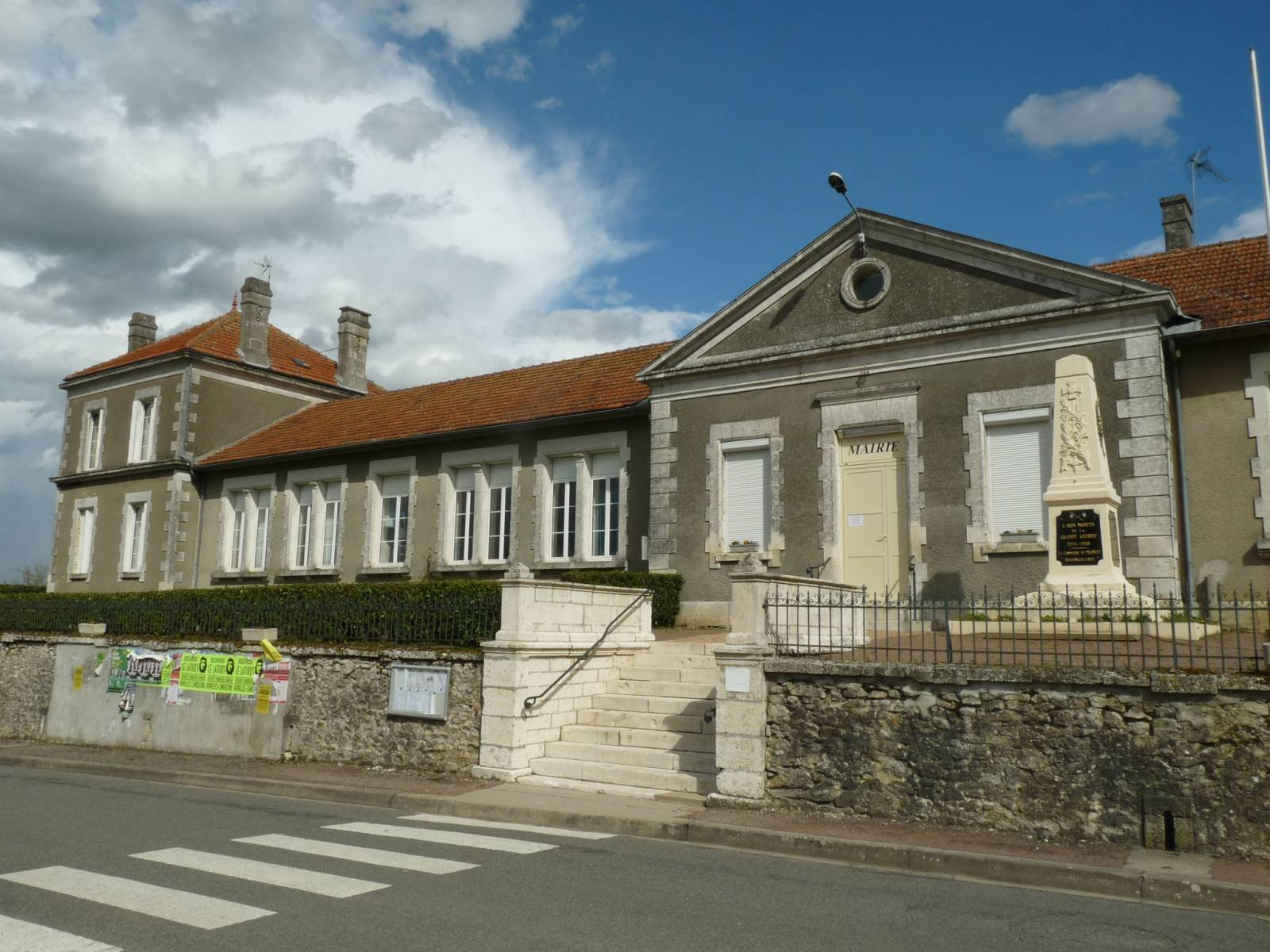
- The town hall in Manot
- Location of Manot
- Location within France Location within Nouvelle-Aquitaine
- Coordinates: 45°56′37″N 0°38′17″E
- Country: France
- Region: Nouvelle-Aquitaine
- Department: Charente
- Arrondissement: Confolens
- Canton: Charente-Vienne

Government
  - Mayor (2020–2026): Jean-Luc Dedieu
- Area^{1}: 20.34 km^{2} (7.85 sq mi)
- Elevation: 191 m (627 ft)
- Highest elevation: 231 m (758 ft)
- Lowest elevation: 132 m (433 ft)
- Population (2023): 555
  - Density: 27.3/km^{2} (70.7/sq mi)
- Time zone: UTC+01:00 (CET)
  - Summer (DST): UTC+02:00 (CEST)
- INSEE/Postal code: 16205 /16500
- ^{1} French Land Register data, which excludes lakes, ponds, glaciers > 1 km^{2} (0.386 sq mi or 247 acres) and river estuaries.

Manot (French pronunciation: [mano]; Occitan: Manòc) is a commune in the Charente department in southwestern France.

== Population ==
Historical population
Year	Pop.	±% p.a.
1968	681	—
1975	672	−0.19%
1982	590	−1.84%
1990	584	−0.13%
1999	576	−0.15%
2007	591	+0.32%
2012	581	−0.34%
2017	550	−1.09%
2023	555	+0.15%
Source: INSEE

== See also ==
- Communes of the Charente department
