= Villegats, Charente =

Villegats
- Part of Courcôme
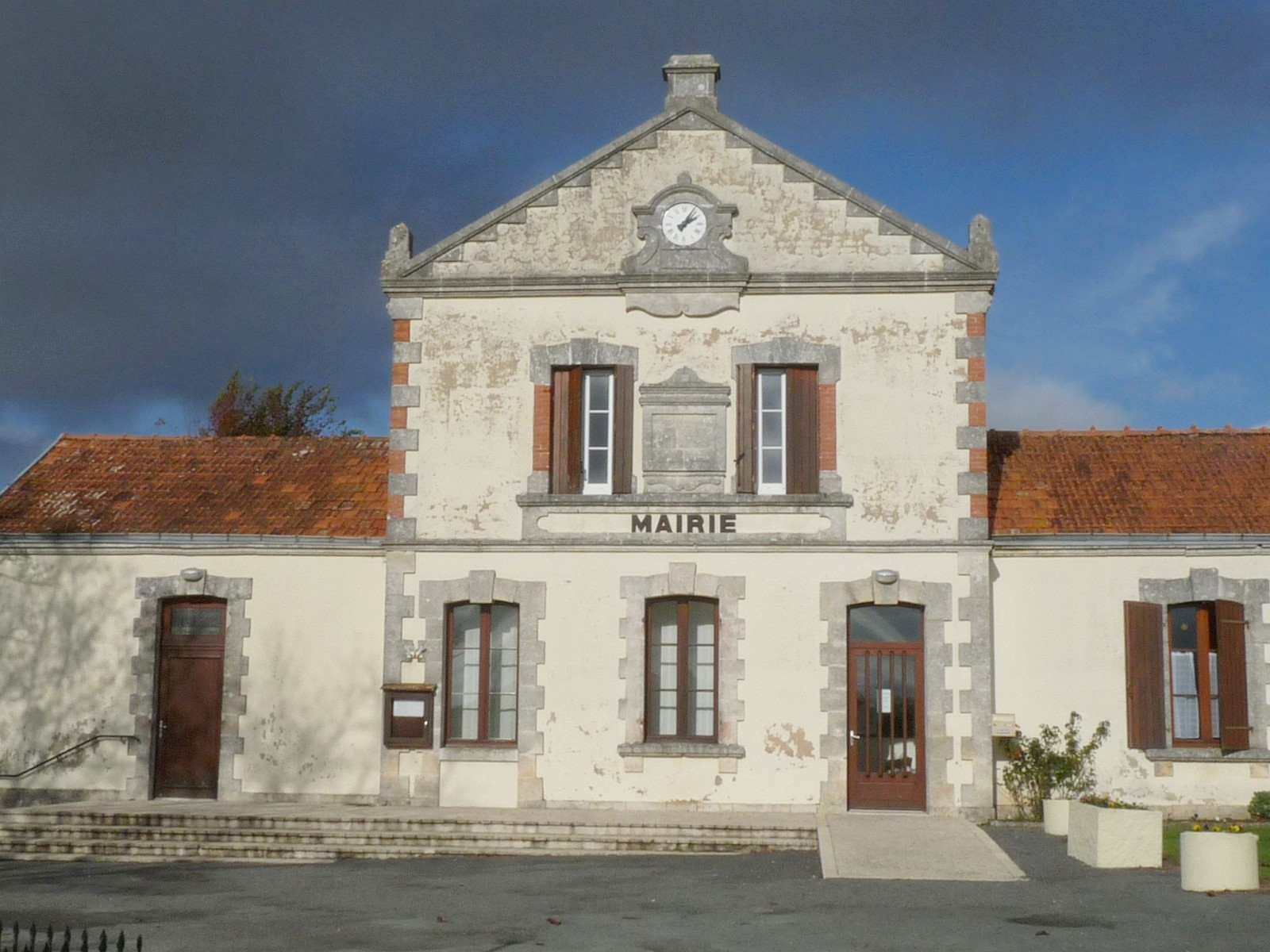
- Town hall
- Location of Villegats
- Location within France Location within Nouvelle-Aquitaine
- Coordinates: 45°59′33″N 0°11′37″E
- Country: France
- Region: Nouvelle-Aquitaine
- Department: Charente
- Arrondissement: Confolens
- Canton: Charente-Nord
- Commune: Courcôme
- Area^{1}: 7.71 km^{2} (2.98 sq mi)
- Elevation: 133 m (436 ft)
- Highest elevation: 161 m (528 ft)
- Lowest elevation: 91 m (299 ft)
- Population (2023): 229
  - Density: 29.7/km^{2} (76.9/sq mi)
- Time zone: UTC+01:00 (CET)
  - Summer (DST): UTC+02:00 (CEST)
- Postal code: 16700
- ^{1} French Land Register data, which excludes lakes, ponds, glaciers > 1 km^{2} (0.386 sq mi or 247 acres) and river estuaries.

Villegats (French pronunciation: [vilɡa]) is a former commune in the Charente department in southwestern France. On 1 January 2019, it was merged into the commune Courcôme.

== See also ==
- Communes of the Charente department
