= Chenon =

- Commune
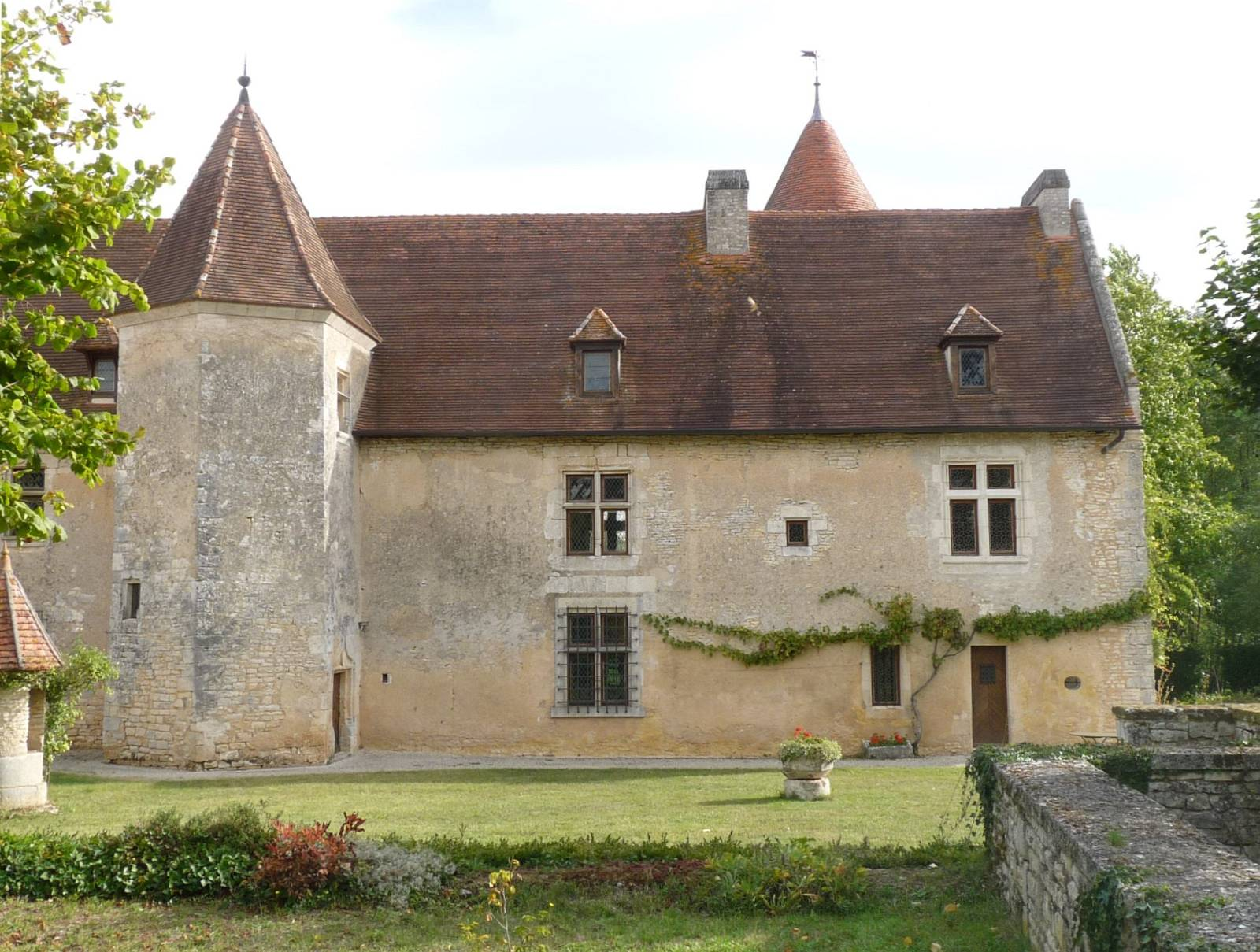
- Chateau
- Location of Chenon
- Location within France Location within Nouvelle-Aquitaine
- Coordinates: 45°56′34″N 0°14′19″E
- Country: France
- Region: Nouvelle-Aquitaine
- Department: Charente
- Arrondissement: Confolens
- Canton: Boixe-et-Manslois

Government
  - Mayor (2020–2026): Martine Mainguet
- Area^{1}: 10.48 km^{2} (4.05 sq mi)
- Elevation: 113 m (371 ft)
- Highest elevation: 118 m (387 ft)
- Lowest elevation: 70 m (230 ft)
- Population (2023): 124
  - Density: 11.8/km^{2} (30.6/sq mi)
- Time zone: UTC+01:00 (CET)
  - Summer (DST): UTC+02:00 (CEST)
- INSEE/Postal code: 16095 /16460
- ^{1} French Land Register data, which excludes lakes, ponds, glaciers > 1 km^{2} (0.386 sq mi or 247 acres) and river estuaries.

Chenon (French pronunciation: [ʃənɔ̃]) is a commune in the Charente department in southwestern France.

== Population ==
Historical population
Year	Pop.	±% p.a.
1968	202	—
1975	185	−1.25%
1982	178	−0.55%
1990	143	−2.70%
1999	149	+0.46%
2007	160	+0.89%
2012	148	−1.55%
2017	135	−1.82%
2023	124	−1.41%
Source: INSEE

== See also ==
- Communes of the Charente department
