= Ligné, Charente =

Ligné
- Commune
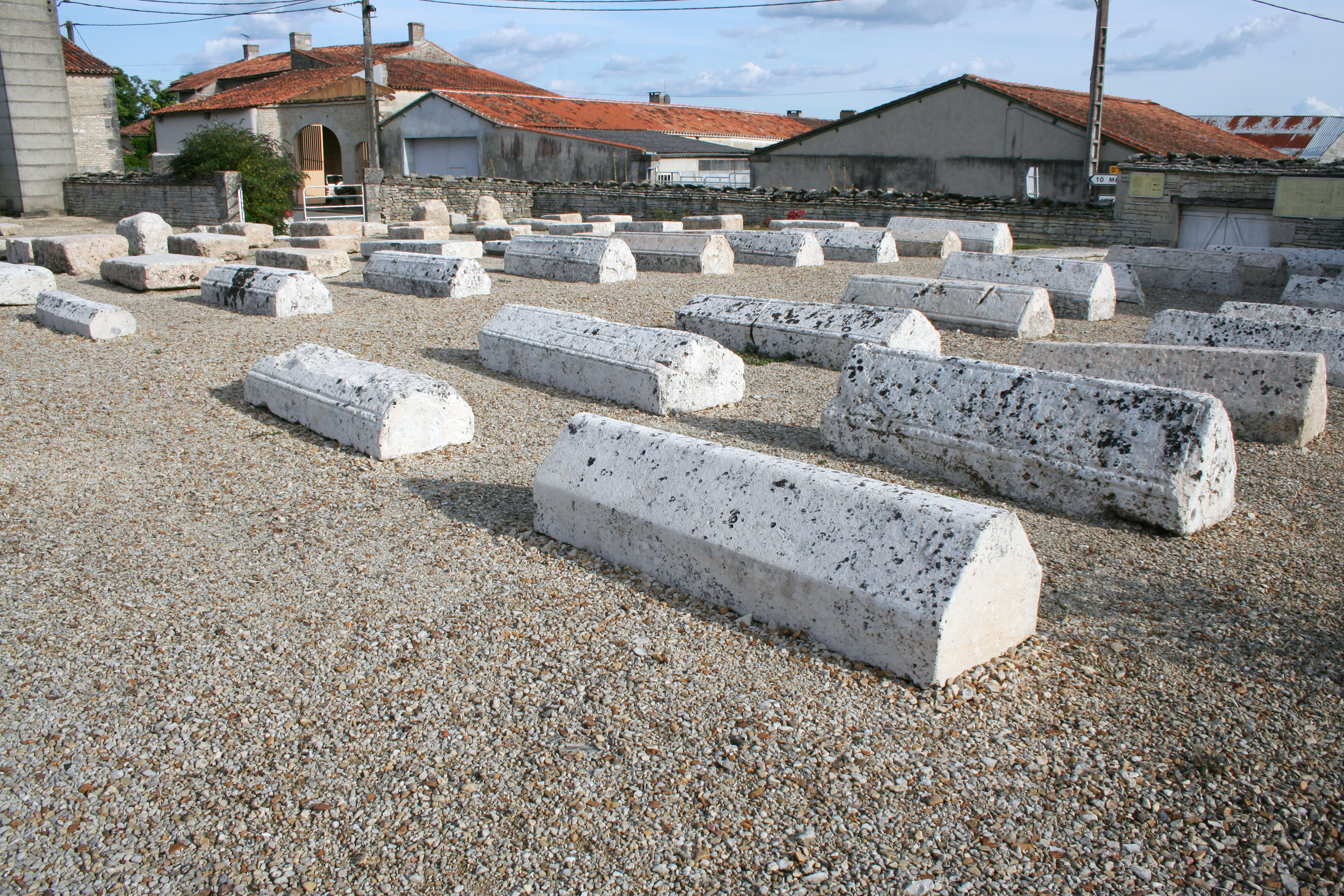
- Medieval cemetery
- Location of Ligné
- Location within France Location within Nouvelle-Aquitaine
- Coordinates: 45°55′23″N 0°06′31″E
- Country: France
- Region: Nouvelle-Aquitaine
- Department: Charente
- Arrondissement: Confolens
- Canton: Charente-Nord
- Intercommunality: Cœur de Charente

Government
  - Mayor (2020–2026): Marie-Claire Gagnaire
- Area^{1}: 7.97 km^{2} (3.08 sq mi)
- Elevation: 86 m (282 ft)
- Highest elevation: 119 m (390 ft)
- Lowest elevation: 52 m (171 ft)
- Population (2023): 144
  - Density: 18.1/km^{2} (46.8/sq mi)
- Demonym(s): Lignéens, Lignéennes
- Time zone: UTC+01:00 (CET)
  - Summer (DST): UTC+02:00 (CEST)
- INSEE/Postal code: 16185 /16140
- ^{1} French Land Register data, which excludes lakes, ponds, glaciers > 1 km^{2} (0.386 sq mi or 247 acres) and river estuaries.

Ligné (French pronunciation: [liɲe]) is a commune in the Charente department in southwestern France.

== Population ==
Historical population
Year	Pop.	±% p.a.
1968	226	—
1975	219	−0.45%
1982	216	−0.20%
1990	194	−1.33%
1999	158	−2.25%
2007	169	+0.84%
2012	166	−0.36%
2017	159	−0.86%
2023	144	−1.64%
Source: INSEE

== See also ==
- Communes of the Charente department
