= Villefagnan =

- Commune
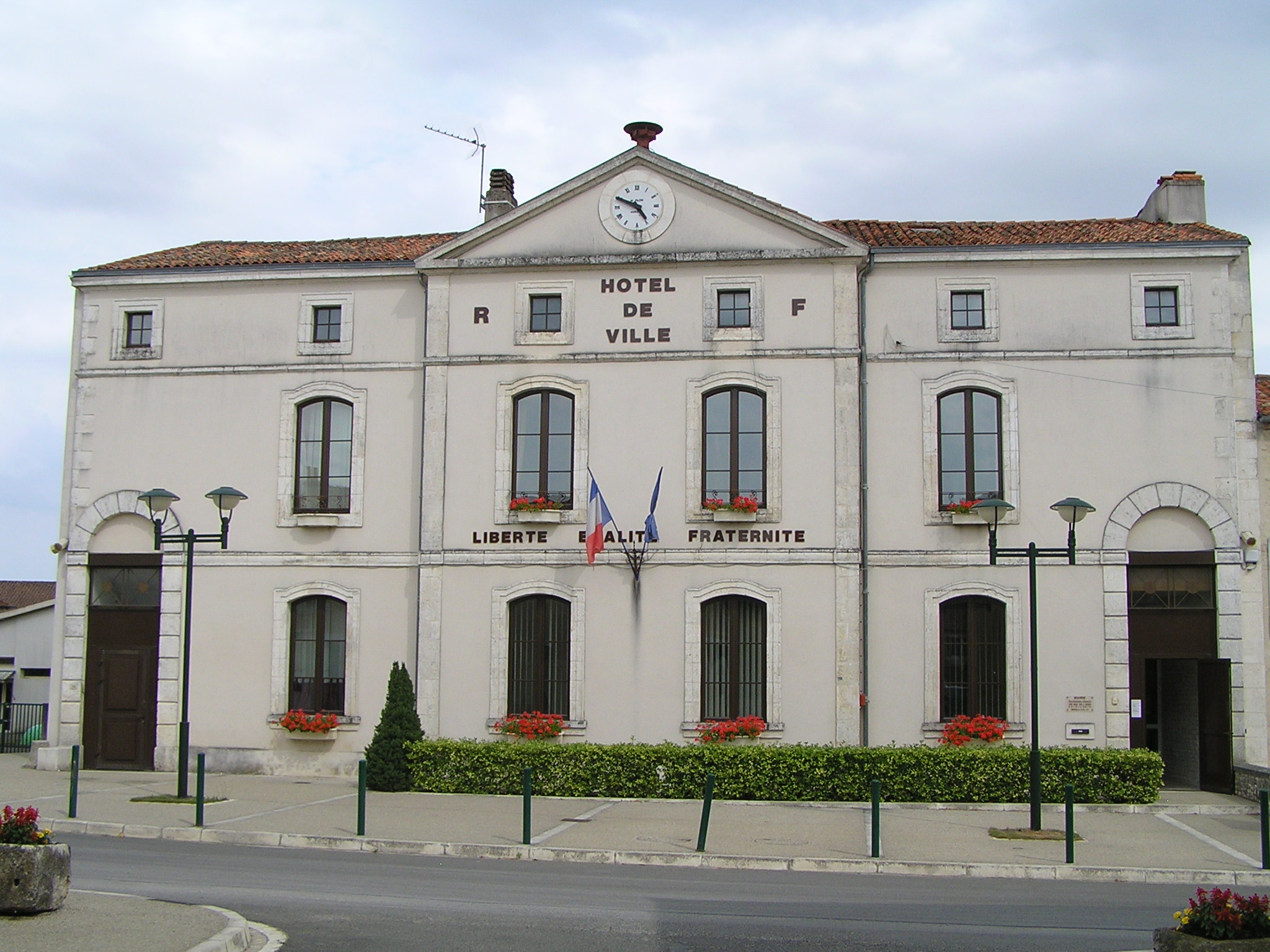
- Town hall

- Coat of arms
- Location of Villefagnan
- Location within France Location within Nouvelle-Aquitaine
- Coordinates: 46°00′51″N 0°04′50″E
- Country: France
- Region: Nouvelle-Aquitaine
- Department: Charente
- Arrondissement: Confolens
- Canton: Charente-Nord

Government
  - Mayor (2020–2026): Pascal Marc Bœuf
- Area^{1}: 23.65 km^{2} (9.13 sq mi)
- Elevation: 111 m (364 ft)
- Highest elevation: 158 m (518 ft)
- Lowest elevation: 88 m (289 ft)
- Population (2023): 972
  - Density: 41.1/km^{2} (106/sq mi)
- Time zone: UTC+01:00 (CET)
  - Summer (DST): UTC+02:00 (CEST)
- INSEE/Postal code: 16409 /16240
- ^{1} French Land Register data, which excludes lakes, ponds, glaciers > 1 km^{2} (0.386 sq mi or 247 acres) and river estuaries.

Villefagnan (French pronunciation: [vilfaɲɑ̃]) is a commune in the Charente department in southwestern France.

== Population ==
Historical population
Year	Pop.	±% p.a.
1968	1,001	—
1975	982	−0.27%
1982	974	−0.12%
1990	996	+0.28%
1999	1,022	+0.29%
2007	1,038	+0.19%
2012	1,012	−0.51%
2017	999	−0.26%
2023	972	−0.46%
Source: INSEE

== See also ==
- Communes of the Charente department
