= Waldalgesheim chariot burial =

4th-century BC Celtic princely chariot burial site

- Waldalgesheimer Fürstengrab
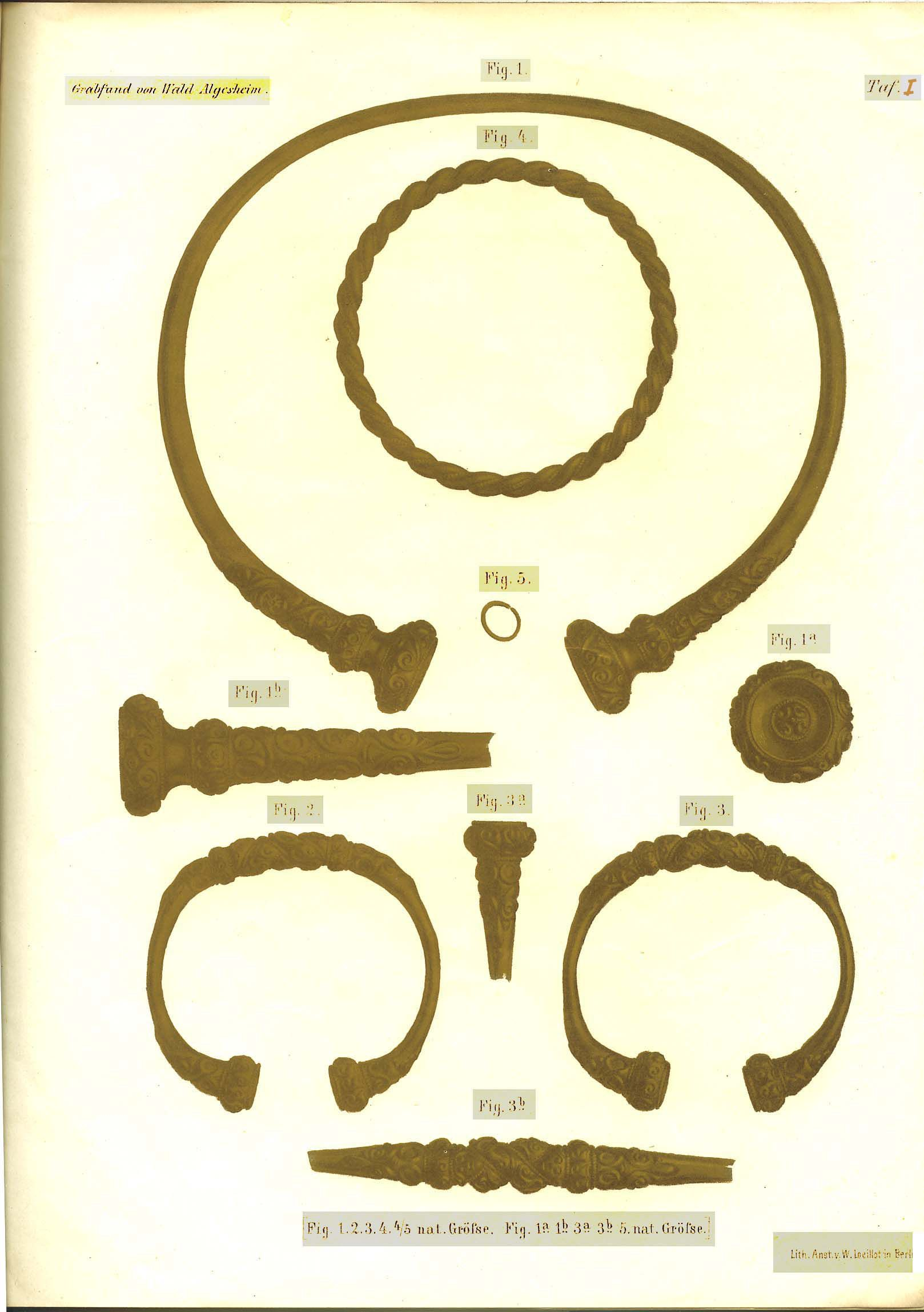
- Jewelry from the burial site

- Location in Germany
- 49.955156°N 7.829601°E
- Type: Chariot burial site
- Cultures: Celts
- Location: Waldalgesheim, Germany

History
- Built: 4th century BC

The Waldalgesheim chariot burial (German: Waldalgesheimer Fürstengrab) was a 4th-century BC Celtic princely chariot burial site in Waldalgesheim, Germany, discovered in 1869. It has given its name to the "Waldalgesheim Style" of artifacts of the La Tène culture, a more fluid and confident style of decoration than early Celtic art, with Greek and Etruscan influences. The objects from the burial site were dug up by the farmer who found them on his land. The site was not investigated by archaeologists, and has recently been covered by a housing development.

== Site ==
Waldalgesheim is in the middle Rhine valley to the west of the point where the Rhine is joined by the Nahe. The first objects were found there by the plowman Peter Heckert on 18 October 1869 while digging holes to plant beets. He did not attach any importance to them at first, but a passer-by said they could be historically important. Eventually a Bingen antique dealer bought the pieces for 450 Thaler. Heckert continued to explore, and eventually found over 30 pieces. It was not until the 20th century that it was recognized that the objects dated to the 4th century BC. Objects from the site including gold rings and a bronze pot are held in the Rheinischen Landesmuseum in Bonn.

After the objects had been found the exact location was forgotten and no effort was made to preserve the site. In 1997 Professor Michael Schönherr tried to organize an investigation of the arable area where the site was presumed to be located, based on fragmentary records. He received no response from the state archaeologists apart from a request not to publish the location since that could attract looters. In 2002 it emerged that there were plans to build housing over the plot.

== Contents ==
The Waldalgesheimer chariot burial is one of the most important finds from the early Celtic period. The grave dates from about 330 BC. It was a wooden chamber under a barrow mound, with the fragments of a two-wheeled chariot to one side. The burial dates from the La Tène Iron Age of the Rhineland. From the absence of warrior equipment and presence of jewelry the burial is presumed to be of a woman. Based on the rich array of grave goods, it is thought to have been that of a Celtic princess. The objects mostly belong to the La Tène B period, apart from a spouted flagon, which is older.

The funerary offerings include gold ornaments, a bronze flagon, a bucket and bronze plaques with repoussé human figures. The finest of the ornaments were a gold torc, an arm ring and two bracelets. The torc and the bracelets were decorated with low-relief "Waldalgesheim style" designs. The style of the objects show influences from eastern France and southern Italy. The bronze bucket from Campania probably dates to the second quarter of the 4th century BC, or soon after. The artifacts also include the fittings of the chariot. The harness and belt attachments have similar styles of ornament to the personal jewelry. Two similar sheets of bronze, badly damaged, are decorated with repoussé busts ornamented with the new style.

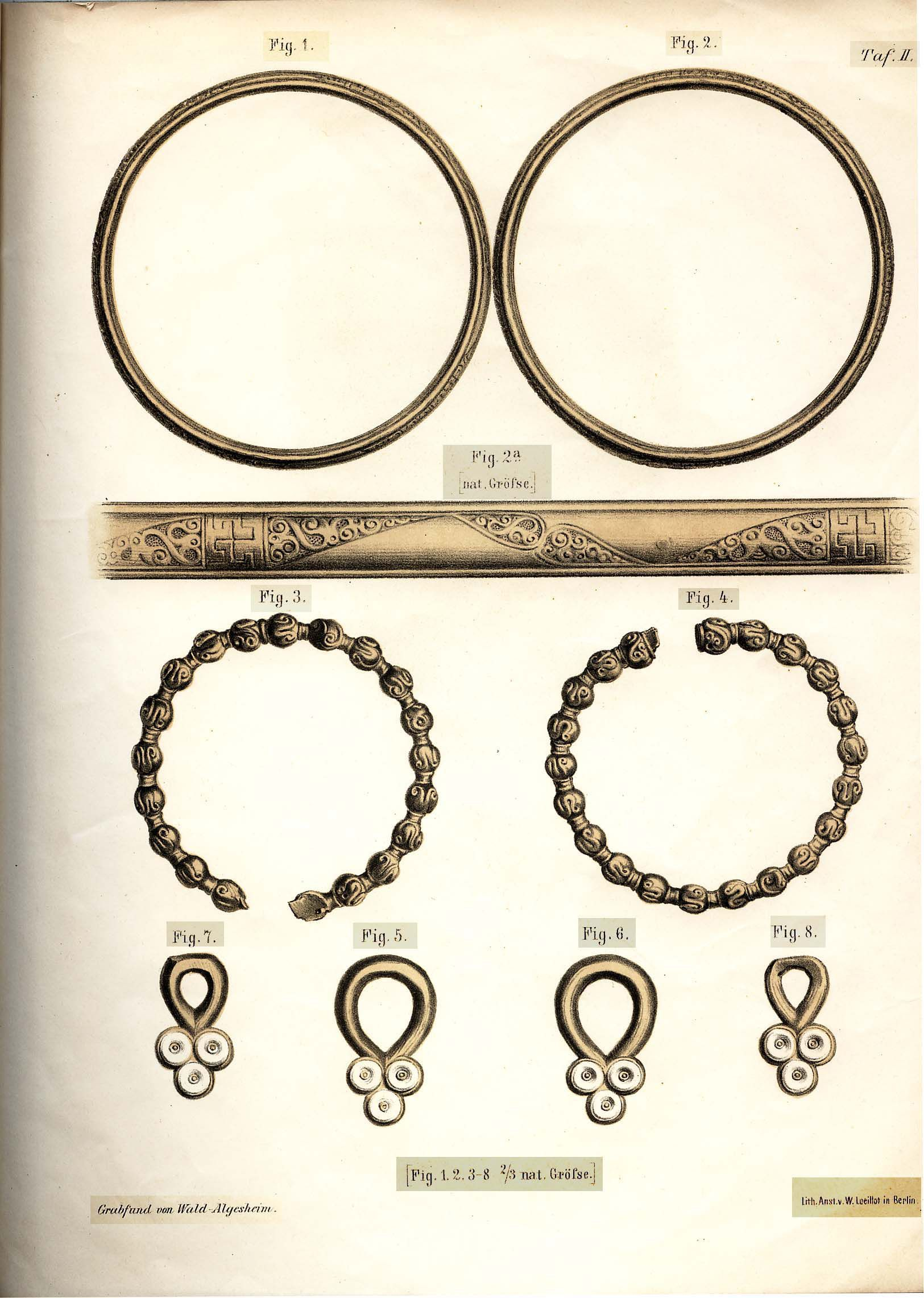
Jewelry

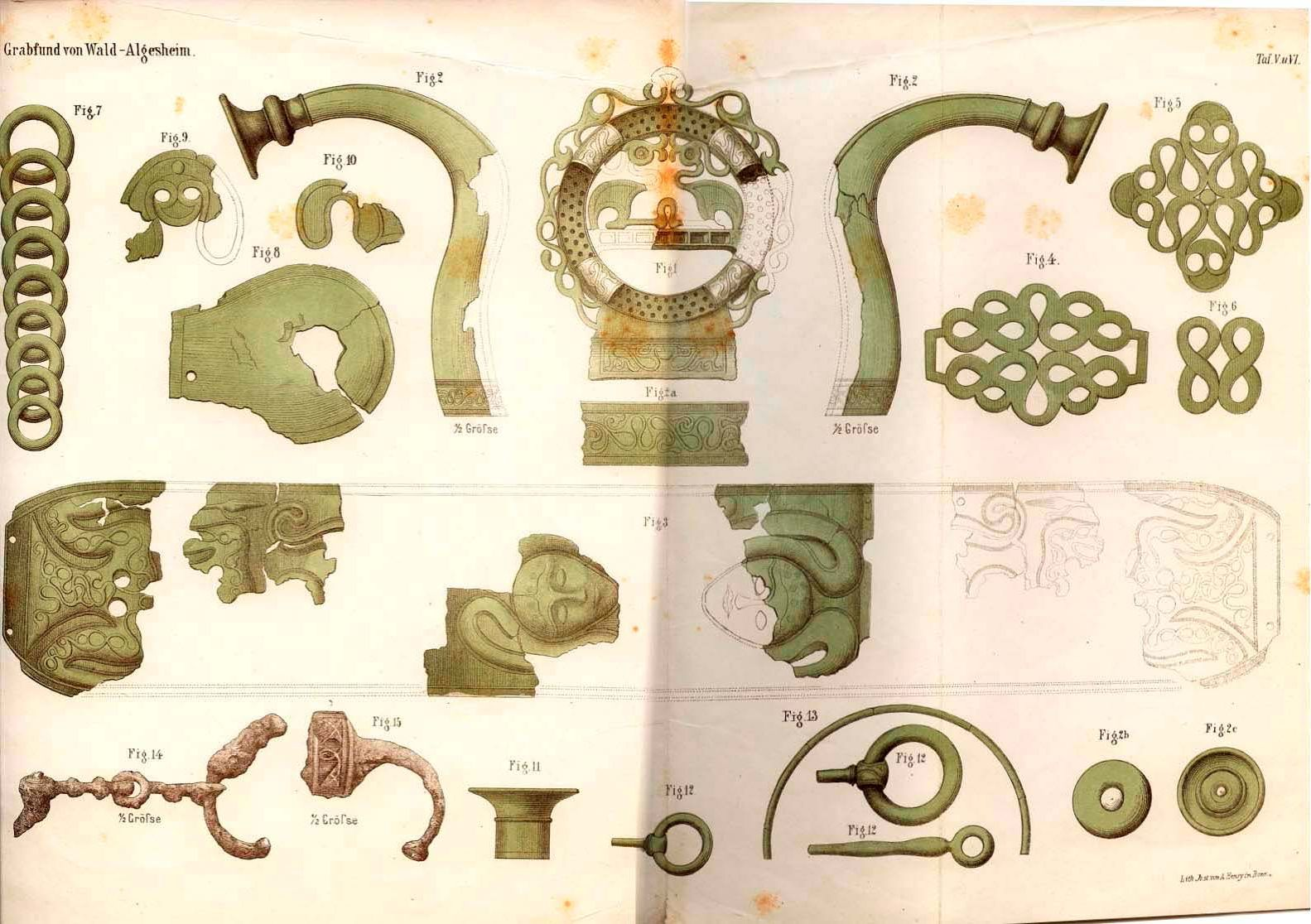
Miscellaneous objects

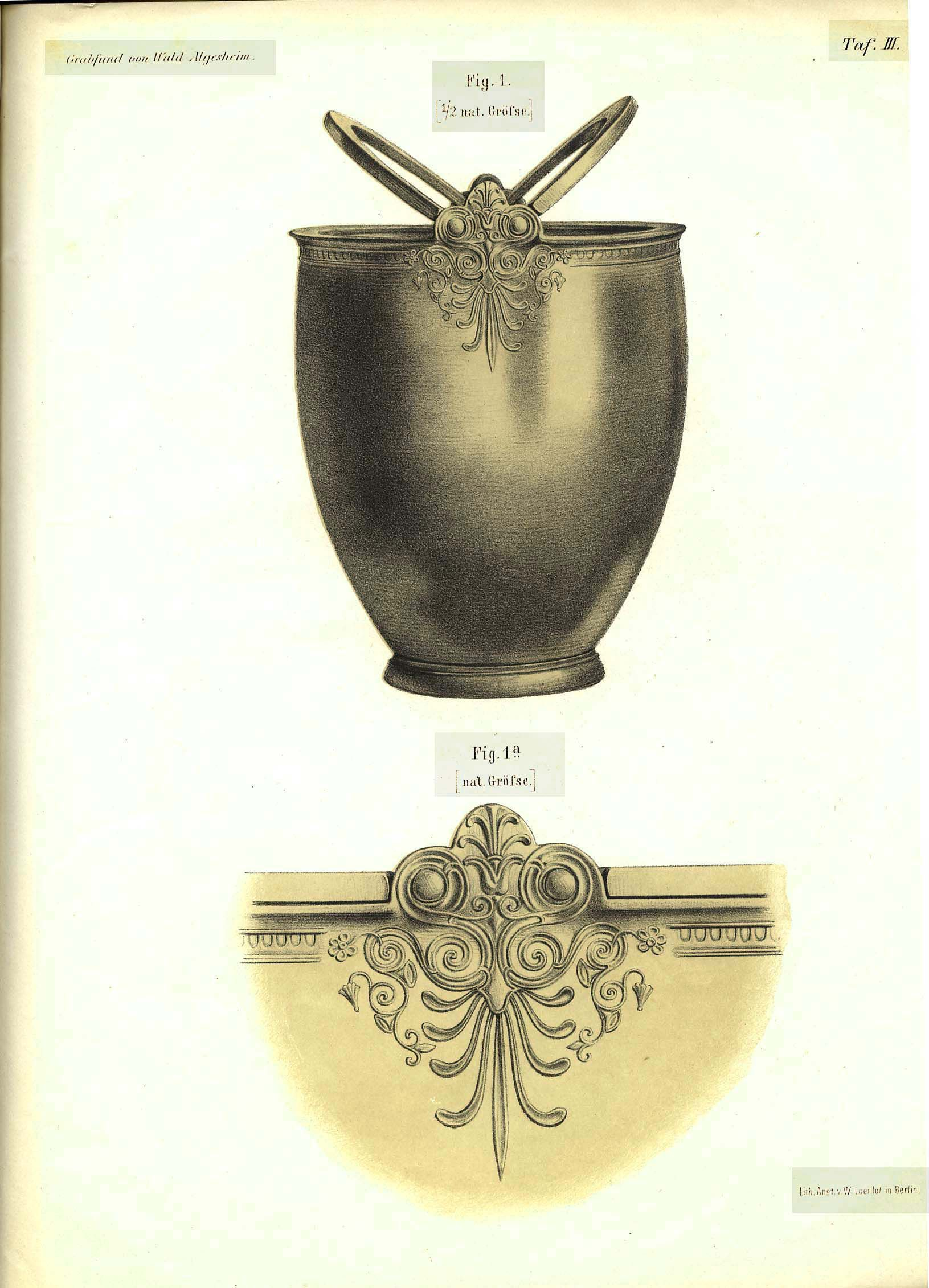
Bucket from Italy

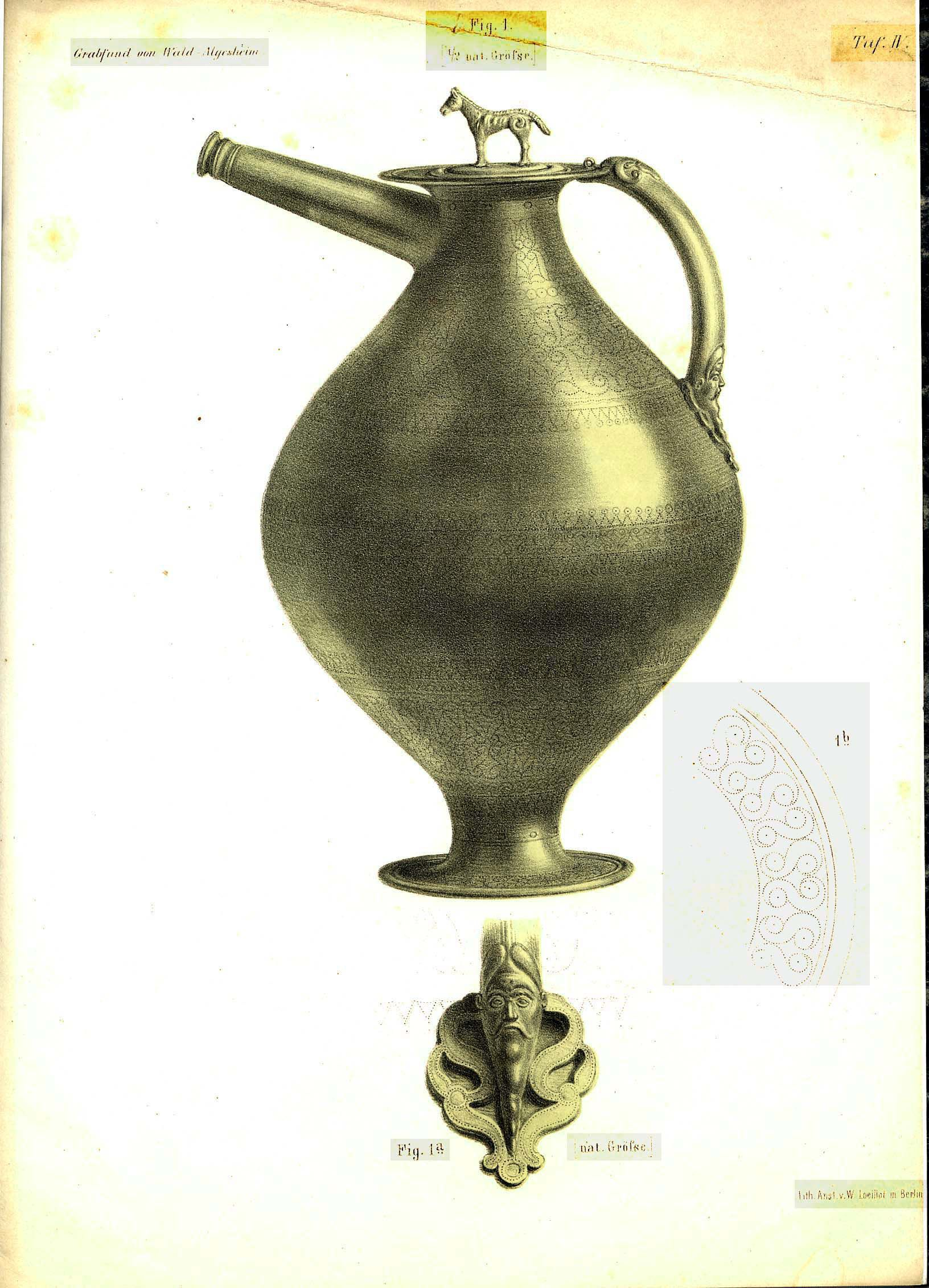
Bronze flagon

The flagon is in Early Style. It is at least a generation older than the other objects. The precise engraving indicates that the flagon was made by skilled and specialized smiths. It is heavily worn on the body, where it would have been held when pouring, showing that it was already old when it was buried. The flagon has a flattened pedestal base, a pot belly and a tubular spout. Similar vessels have been found as far apart as Eigenbilzen in Belgium and Dürrnberg in Austria, and pottery versions have also been found. There is a benign human face at the foot of the flagon's handle, and a stylized ram's head at the upper end of the handle. A horse decorates the lid of the flagon, showing eastern influences. Similarities with a gilt-bronze spouted flagon found at Reinheim indicate the same artist may have made both, or they may have been made by artists from the same school.

The flagon and the bronze bucket seem to have been more deeply buried than the gold torc and bracelets, which has been taken as possible evidence of two burials at different dates. However, it is entirely possible that the older objects were heirlooms buried at the same time as the more recent jewelry.

== Waldalgesheim style ==
The term "Waldalgesheim Style" was coined by Paul Jacobsthal (1880–1957) for objects with similar style to those found at Waldalgesheim. It continues to draw on classical Celtic plant motifs, but marks the highest artistic level of the early Le Tene period with its confident interpretation and execution. There is disagreement about the origin of the style, with no reason to suppose that it first appeared in the Rhineland. For this reason, some archaeologists prefer the term "vegetal" to reflect the emphasis on design derived from plants, and particularly from tendrils. However, it is not the only style to use such motifs, and it included motifs unrelated to plants.

Metalwork in this style appeared throughout Celtic Europe after about 350 BC. The style shows influence from the Early Style, but generally has been found in different locations apart from the Marne region of the north of France. Although the Waldalgesheimer objects were found in a late barrow, Waldalgesheimer style objects are more often found in flat cemeteries in southern Germany, Switzerland, Italy and central and southeast Europe. Some archaeologists see Waldalgesheimer influences in British objects, but this is questionable. The decorative style is found on different types of objects in different regions: sword sheaths in Italy, fibulae in Switzerland and neck rings in France. This indicates that the style was developed by specialized local craftsmen who adapted new decorative designs from Greek models, as opposed to being spread by traveling craftsmen.

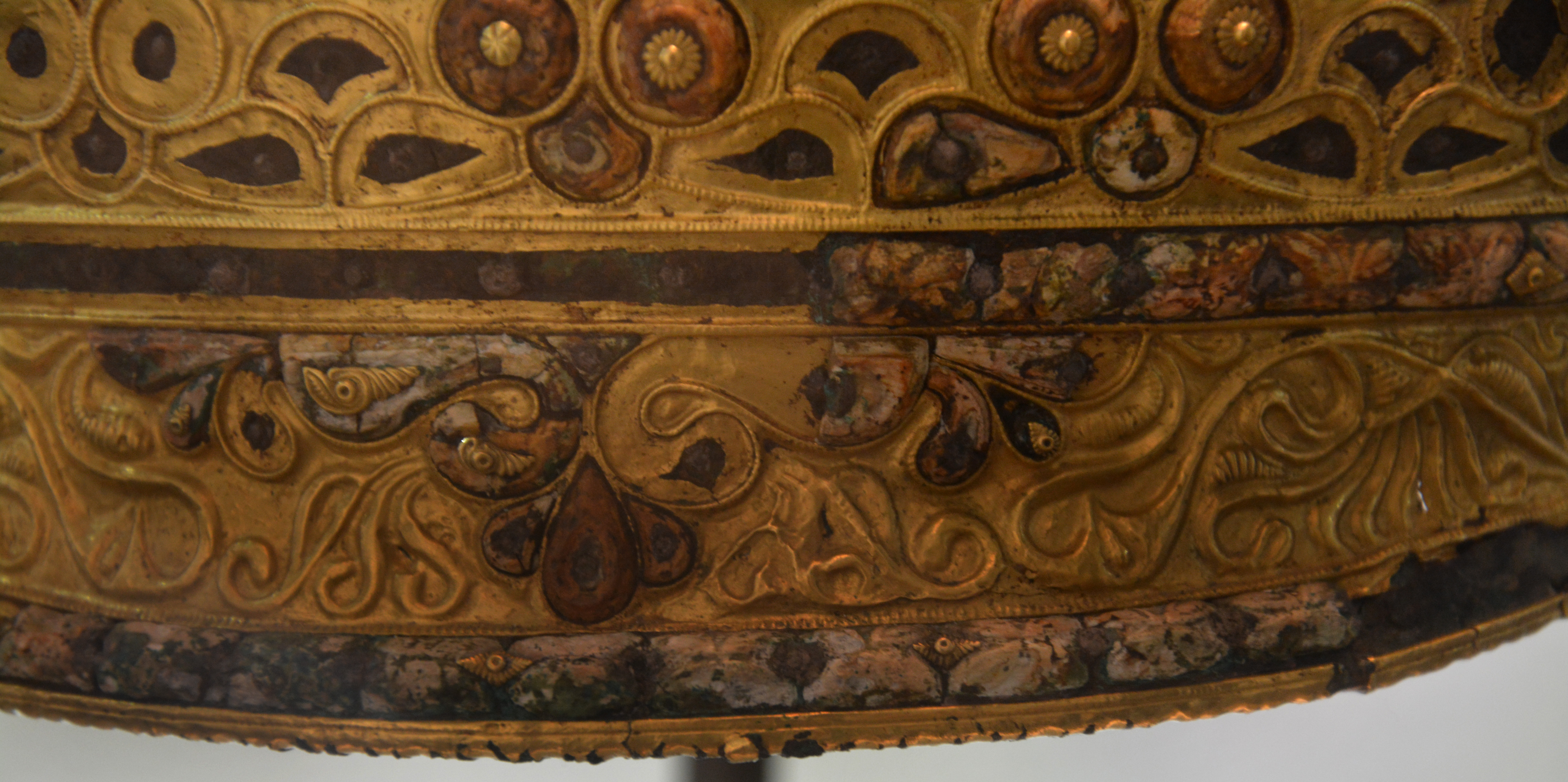
Ornamentation on the neck guard of the Agris Helmet

The Waldalgesheimer style is less naturalistic than the Early Style, with plant motifs that characteristically flow into each other in a continuous manner. The designs subtly incorporate elements of human and animal faces and bodies. Sometimes the designs incorporate chains of triskels, or curved-sided triangles. The style includes sinuous tendrils and scrolls and asymmetrical plant spirals. The low-relief compositions have over-and-under patterns. Megaw (1970) has called the style "assured irrationality". Two basic themes are the serpentine scroll and the lyre-motif, often combined with palmette.

The parade armor helmets found in Amfreville-sous-les-Monts and in Agris are examples of the style. The Agris Helmet is remarkable as an example of high-status Le Tene metalwork which may have been buried as a ritual offering to the underworld spirits. The upper and lower panels of the helmet are decorated with unconnected palmettes, and the central panel with a series of S-curves, again unconnected. The infilling designs on the center panel show similarities to the Waldalgesheim objects, while the ornament of the neck-guard shows a freer experiment with a sinuous composition.

== Sources ==
- Collis, John (2003-09-16). The European Iron Age. Routledge. ISBN 978-1-134-74637-8.
- Harding, D.W. (2007-06-11). The Archaeology of Celtic Art. Routledge. ISBN 978-1-134-26464-3.
- Harding, D.W. (2014-11-13). The Iron Age in Lowland Britain. Taylor & Francis. ISBN 978-1-317-60285-9.
- Kipfer, Barbara Ann (2000-04-30). Encyclopedic Dictionary of Archaeology. Springer Science & Business Media. ISBN 978-0-306-46158-3.
- Koch, John T.; Minard, Antone (2012). The Celts: History, Life, and Culture. ABC-CLIO. ISBN 978-1-59884-964-6.
- Sandars, Nancy K. (1995). Prehistoric Art in Europe. Yale University Press. ISBN 978-0-300-05286-2.
- Schönherr, Prof. Michael (October 2006). "Das Waldalgesheimer Fürstengrab" (PDF) (in German).
- Shaw, Ian; Jameson, Robert (2008-04-15). A Dictionary of Archaeology. John Wiley & Sons. ISBN 978-0-470-75196-1.
- "Waldalgesheimer Stil". Zukunftsgemeinde Waldalgesheim.
