= Agri =

Agri may refer to:

== Places ==
- Ağrı Province, eastern Turkey
  - Ağrı, the capital city of the province
- Ağrı, the Turkish name for Mount Ararat in Turkey
- Ağrı Subregion, Turkey, a statistical subregion
- Ağrı (electoral district), an electoral district of the Grand National Assembly of Turkey
- Agri (river), southern Italy
- Ağrı, Azerbaijan, a village and municipality

== People ==
- Agri (Maeotae), an ancient tribe in the Caucasus region
- Antonio Agri (1932–1998), Argentine classical and tango violinist
- Sanjana Agri, Indian politician
- Syaffarizal Mursalin Agri (born 1992), Indonesian footballer

== Other uses ==
- Agri (caste), a Hindu caste in the state of Maharashtra, India
- Agri dialect, spoken in parts of western India
- Agri Broadcast Network, a former radio network in Ohio, United States
- European Parliament Committee on Agriculture and Rural Development (AGRI)
- Azerbaijan–Georgia–Romania Interconnector (AGRI), a proposed project to transport Azerbaijani natural gas to Romania and further to Central Europe

== See also ==
- Agriș (disambiguation)
