= Agris Helmet =

Ceremonial Celtic helmet from c. 350 BC

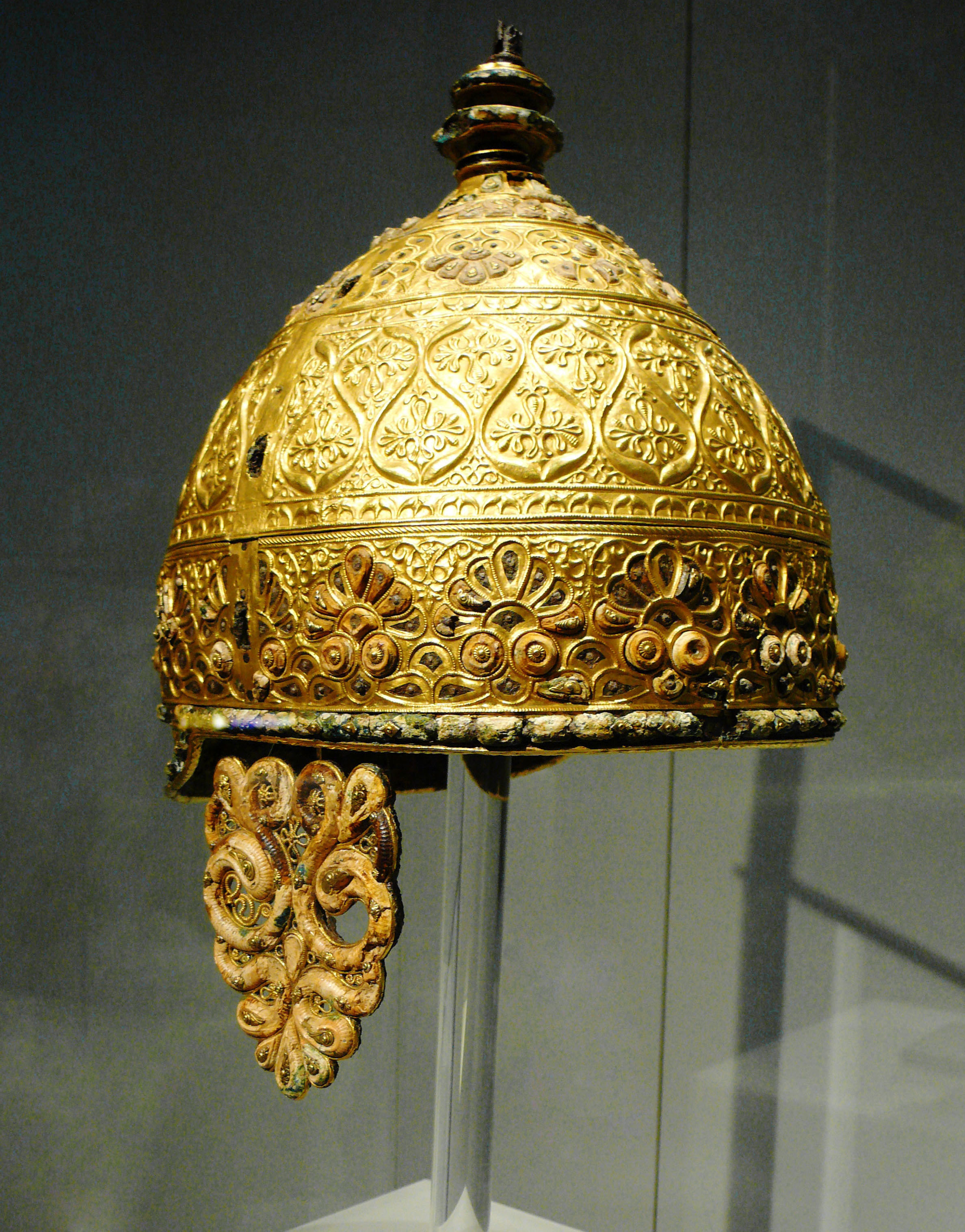
- Material: Iron, bronze, gold, coral
- Size: 21.4 centimetres (8.4 in) high 23 by 19 centimetres (9.1 by 7.5 in) wide Cheek-guard: 9.4 by 7.6 centimetres (3.7 by 3.0 in)
- Created: 4th century BC
- Place: Agris, Charente, France
- Present location: Musée d'Angoulême

The Agris Helmet (French: Casque d'Agris) is a ceremonial Celtic helmet from c. 350 BC that was found in a cave near Agris, Charente, France, in 1981. It is a masterpiece of Celtic art, and would probably have been used for display rather than worn in battle. The helmet consists of an iron cap completely covered with bands of bronze. The bronze is in turn covered with unusually pure gold leaf, with embedded coral decorations attached using silver rivets. One of the cheek guards was also found and has similar materials and designs. The helmet is mostly decorated in early Celtic patterns but there are later Celtic motifs and signs of Greek influence. The quality of the gold indicates that the helmet may well have been made locally in the Atlantic region.

== Discovery ==
The Agris helmet was found in a cave near Angoulême in 1981. The Perrats cave had been known for just over a week when cavers found two contiguous parts of the front of the helmet on 9–10 May 1981. The fragments were on a cone of debris thrown out from a badger burrow in the cave's main chamber. An excavation team was quickly formed to search the site. They found scraps of gold leaf, two fragments that joined to form a larger triangular piece, and then the helmet itself, which was well-preserved other than the part that had been torn off by the badgers.

The site shows signs of having been occupied from the Bronze Age through the Iron Age, the Gallo-Roman period and into the Middle Ages. The entrance collapsed and closed the cave in the 13th or 14th century AD. At the time of discovery almost all the parts of the helmet had been disturbed by burrowing animals. In 1983, the cheek guard and three fragments of ornamentation from the side of the helmet were discovered during excavations. Other fragments were found in 1986, including the base of the helmet's crest, several meters from where the helmet had been found. They seem to have been carried there accidentally, either by people or by badgers. The second cheek guard and the ornamentation of the summit of the helmet have not been found.

The government bought the found objects from the owner of the land. The helmet was restored by Laszlo von Lehóczky at the Romano-Germanic Central Museum (Mainz). It is now held by the Musée d'Angoulême in Angoulême, France. (Note: It is sometimes reported that the helmet was given to the Archaeological and Historical Society of the Charente. This is incorrect.) The helmet is considered one of the masterpieces of Celtic art and has been featured in several international exhibitions. It has even formed the basis for a graphic novel, Le casque d'Agris (2005).

== Context ==
Location of Agris to the west of the Massif Central in France

Excavations in 2002 show that the cave entrance was guarded by a mud wall and a ditch, and would have been a sanctuary until the early Roman Empire. The helmet is isolated, with no sign of a human burial, and was buried deliberately. At the time of burial at least some of the external ornaments had been broken off and placed in the interior of the helmet. The helmet had been carefully placed. The archaeologists who found it think it may have been buried as part of a ritual to the underworld spirits. Roman sources say that the Celtic warriors generally did not wear helmets. The helmet would have been used for display, and would have indicated the high rank of the owner, or the wish to attain such a rank.

The helmet dates from the early period of the La Tène culture. The gold leaf is extremely pure, and the helmet may be one of the oldest refined gold objects of Western Europe. It was found further west than most other examples of high-status La Tène metalwork. A few similar objects have been found in France at Amfreville-sous-les-Monts (Normandy), Saint-Jean-Trolimon (Brittany) and Montlaurès near Narbonne (Aude) and in Italy at Canosa (Puglia).

The design of the inner iron cap is similar to that of a series of helmets that have mostly been found in the Central Alps. The veneer of bronze strips recalls Italian helmets of the Montefortino type. The palmette-based design links it to the early style of the La Tène culture. Most of the motifs in the decoration belong to the first western style of the culture, or are closely derived from this style. Other motifs are from an intermediate stage with the Waldalgesheim style.

Authorities differ on the date of the helmet. In a 2001 paper, José Gomez De Soto suggests the middle or the second half of the 4th century. D. W. Harding says the stratigraphic association of the helmet with a Dux-type fibula from La Tène B and other signs indicate that it was made in the later part of the 4th century. However, in a 2010 paper Gomez de Soto and Stephane Verger conclude that the decorations, when viewed as a whole, indicate that the helmet was made in the 2nd quarter or the middle of the 4th century.

== Structure ==
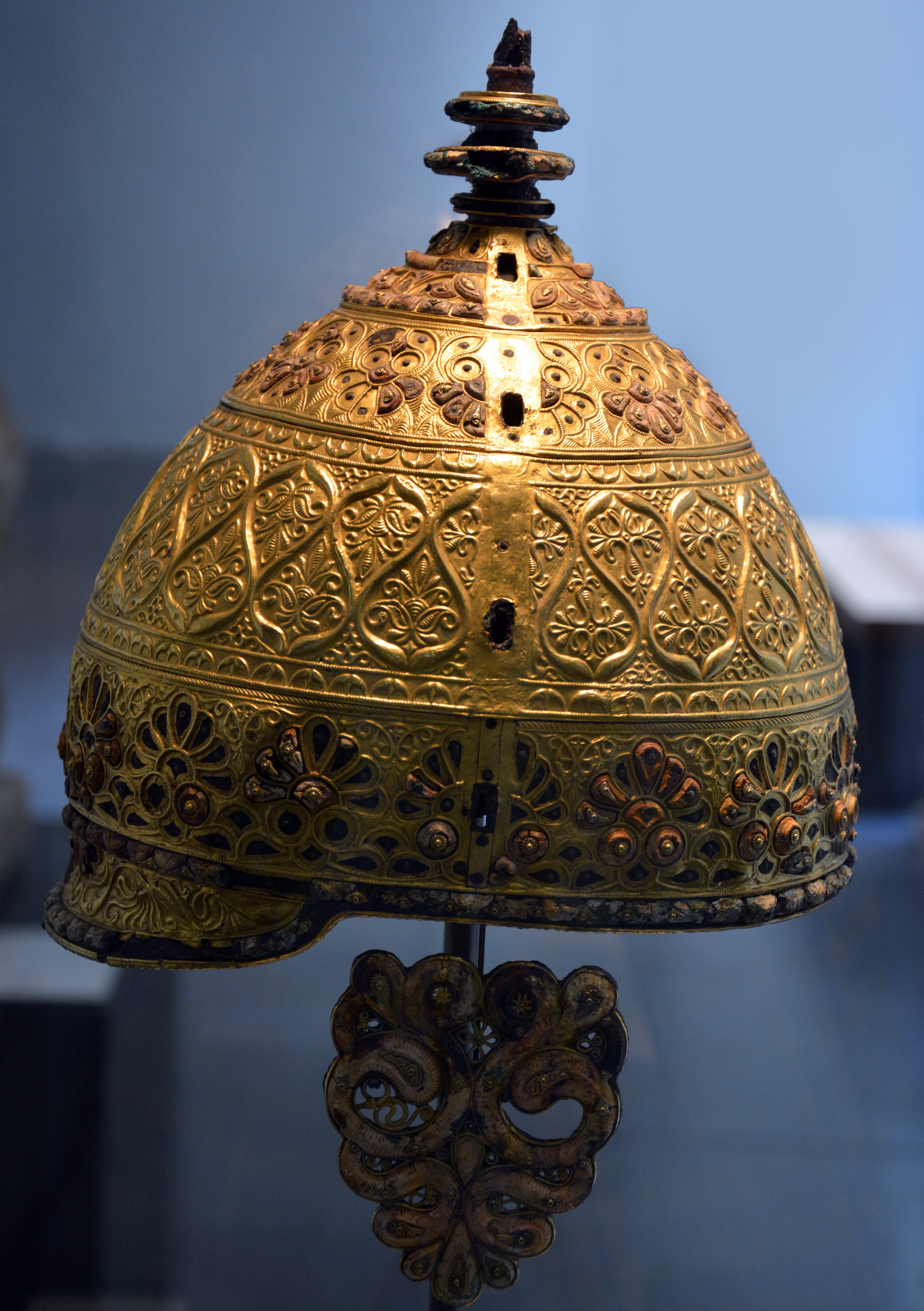
View of the helmet showing the neck guard (lower left) and cheek protector (lower center)

The helmet has been described as having a jockey-cap shape, but the "bill" of the cap is actually a neck-guard. It is 21.4 centimetres (8.4 in) high and 23 by 19 centimetres (9.1 by 7.5 in) laterally. The inner cap of the helmet is of iron, now heavily corroded. It is made of a single piece of hammered iron, with the neck guard riveted to the back. The iron is entirely covered by ornamental bronze bands with low-relief decoration formed partly by casting and partly by repoussé and chasing. The four wide horizontal strips of bronze are fully covered with gold leaf on the outside surface. The decorations include embedded cabochons of shaped and polished coral.

All the relief decorations were formed on the bronze strips before the gold leaf was applied. The gold leaf, about 70 microns thick, was affixed by pressing it closely onto the bronze relief with a tool that may have been made of wood or bone. The gold leaf would have been held in place by the grooves and imitation filigree in the bronze. The coral cabochons were attached to the bronze by silver rivets whose heads are decorated with motifs such as diamonds or palm leaves. (Note: The rivets are made of an alloy with at least 80% silver, 20% gold and almost 1% copper. This would have been relatively easy to work, but stronger than pure gold or silver.) Sometimes the hollow that holds the coral was at least partially gold-covered before the coral was placed. Gold leaf was then applied generously around the coral to form a small cup.

There is a finely wrought cheek-piece. The cheek guard (paragnathide) and the side and top ornaments used the same materials and techniques as the main helmet. There are signs that organic materials such as wood and leather were also used.

== Decoration ==
The helmet is particularly richly ornamented. The main theme is a series of palmettes, with many of the palmettes and studs infilled with coral. The ornamentation is arranged into three superimposed bands completely covered by compositions inspired by plants. The many different patterns combined into complex compositions make the headpiece one of the richest of ancient Celtic artworks.

In the lower and upper panels a series of unconnected palmettes are arranged formally in friezes. The central panel decorations are based on a formal arrangement of S-curves terminating in swelling leaves, with a filler pattern that includes palmettes, comma-leaves and over-and-under tendrils. The neck-guard has a less formal and more fluid pattern. The cheek guard has a palmette design in which may be seen a curled serpent that appears to be horned. Horned serpents are often found in Romano-Celtic works in Britain and France, but very rarely in early La Tène. The depiction on the helmet may have some special significance.

The decoration mainly reflects the 5th century Early Style of Celtic Art, but some motifs are characteristic of the Waldalgesheim style of the 4th century, The central panel designs show similarities to the Waldalgesheim bracelets. This indicates that the helmet was made in the first half of the 4th century. The large palmettes with seven petals in the lower band and the main frieze in the central band may have been inspired by architectural terracotta from Tyrrhenian central Italy in the 5th and 4th centuries. The neck guard combines Waldalgesheim style with elements of 4th century Greek or Etruscan work.

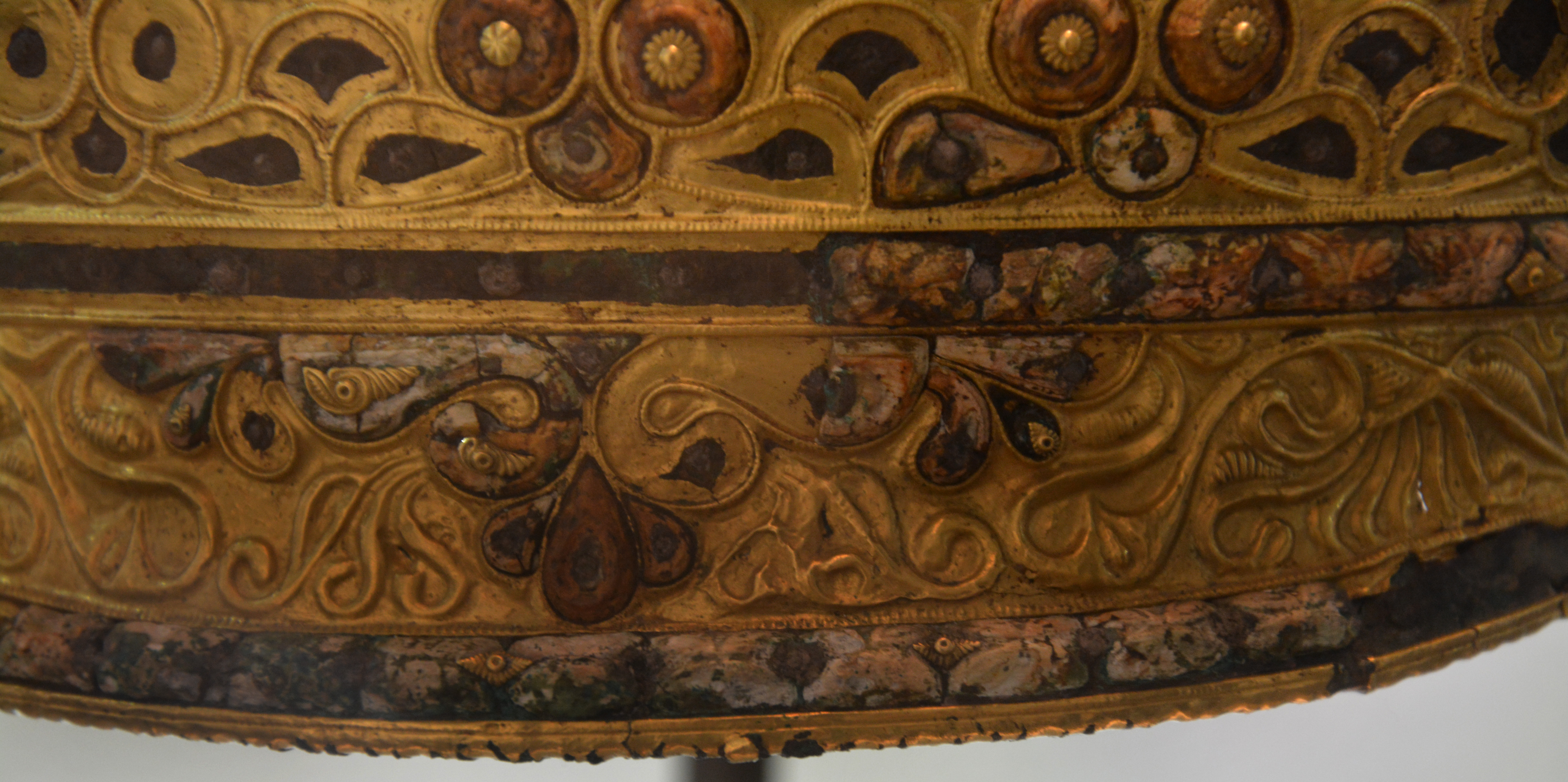
Decoration on the neck-guard

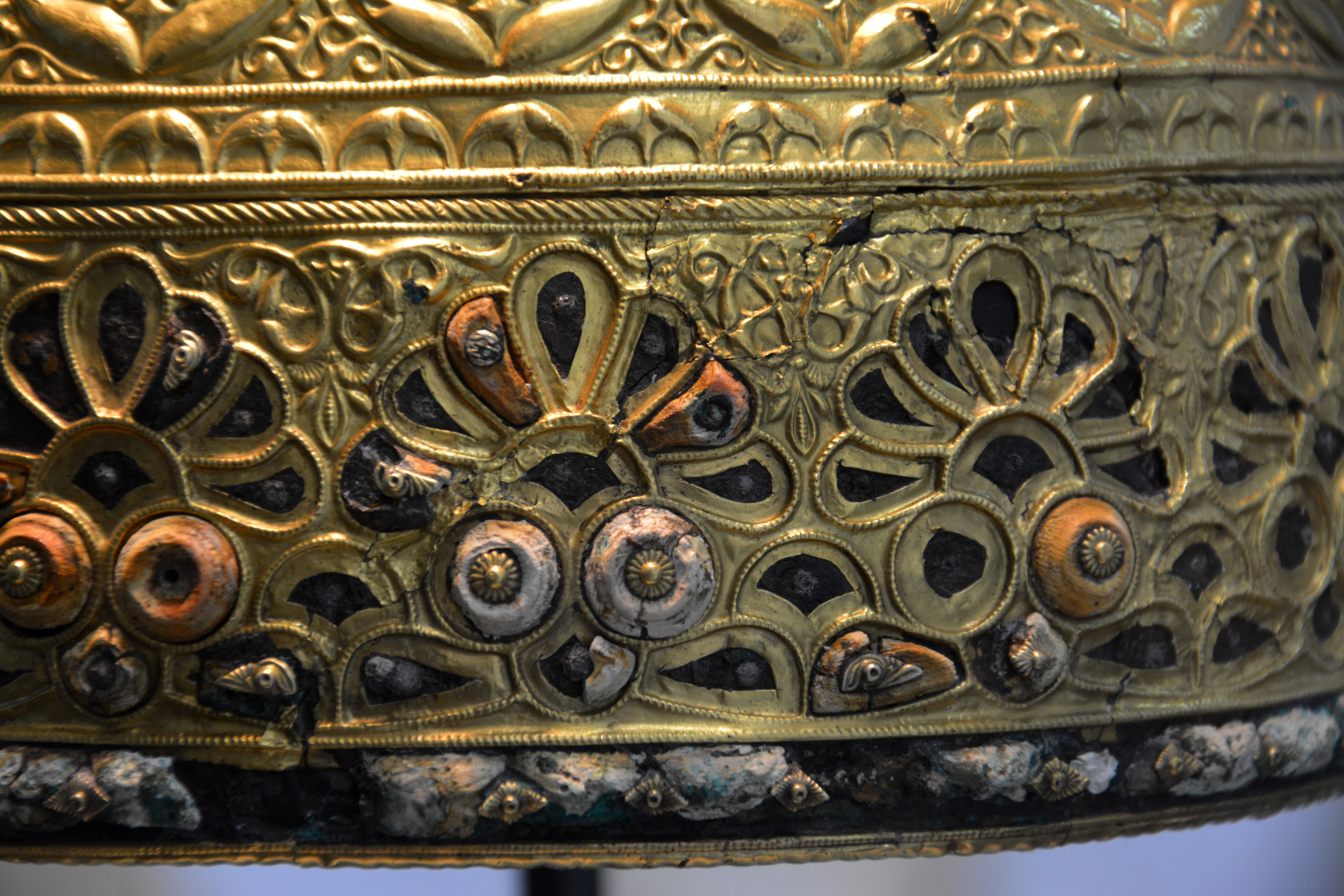
Decoration on the lower band

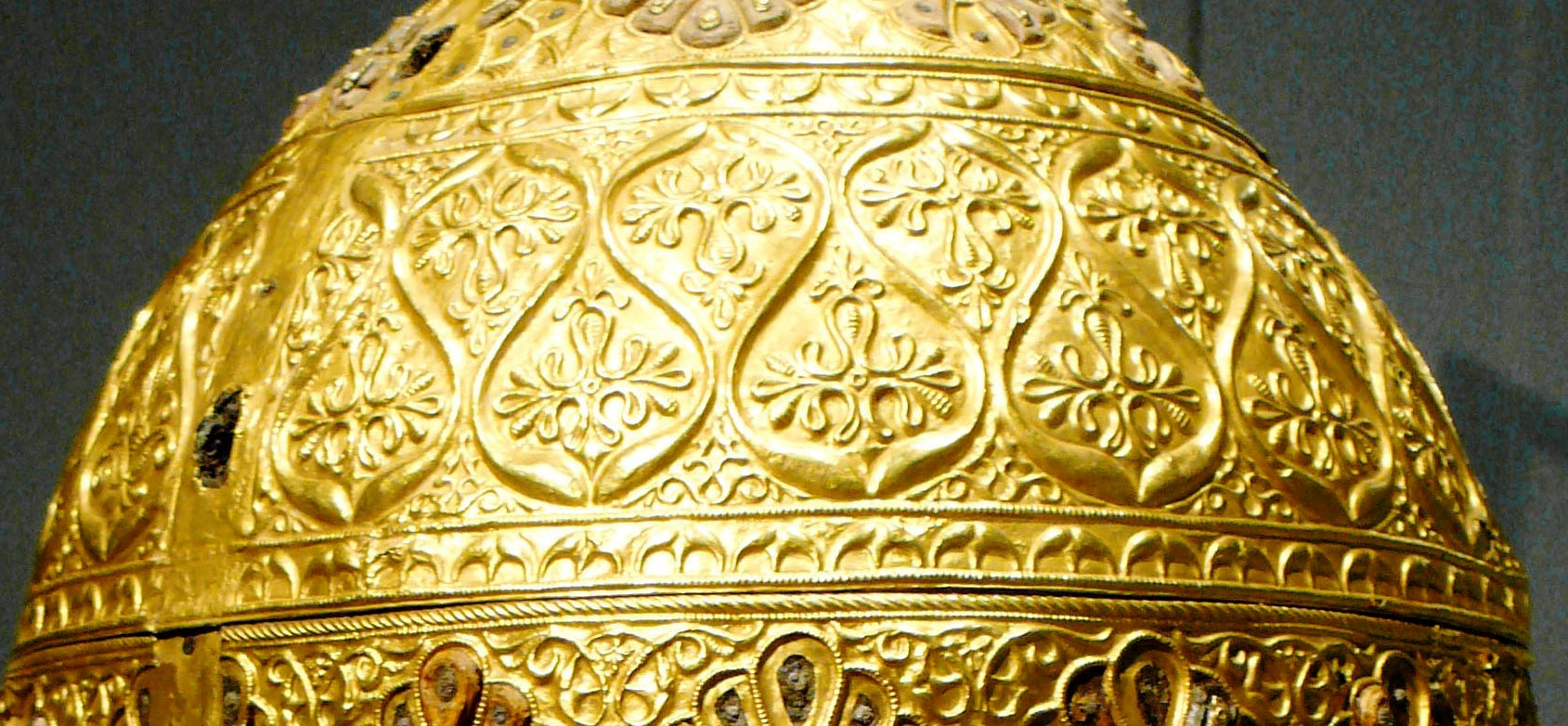
Decoration on the center band

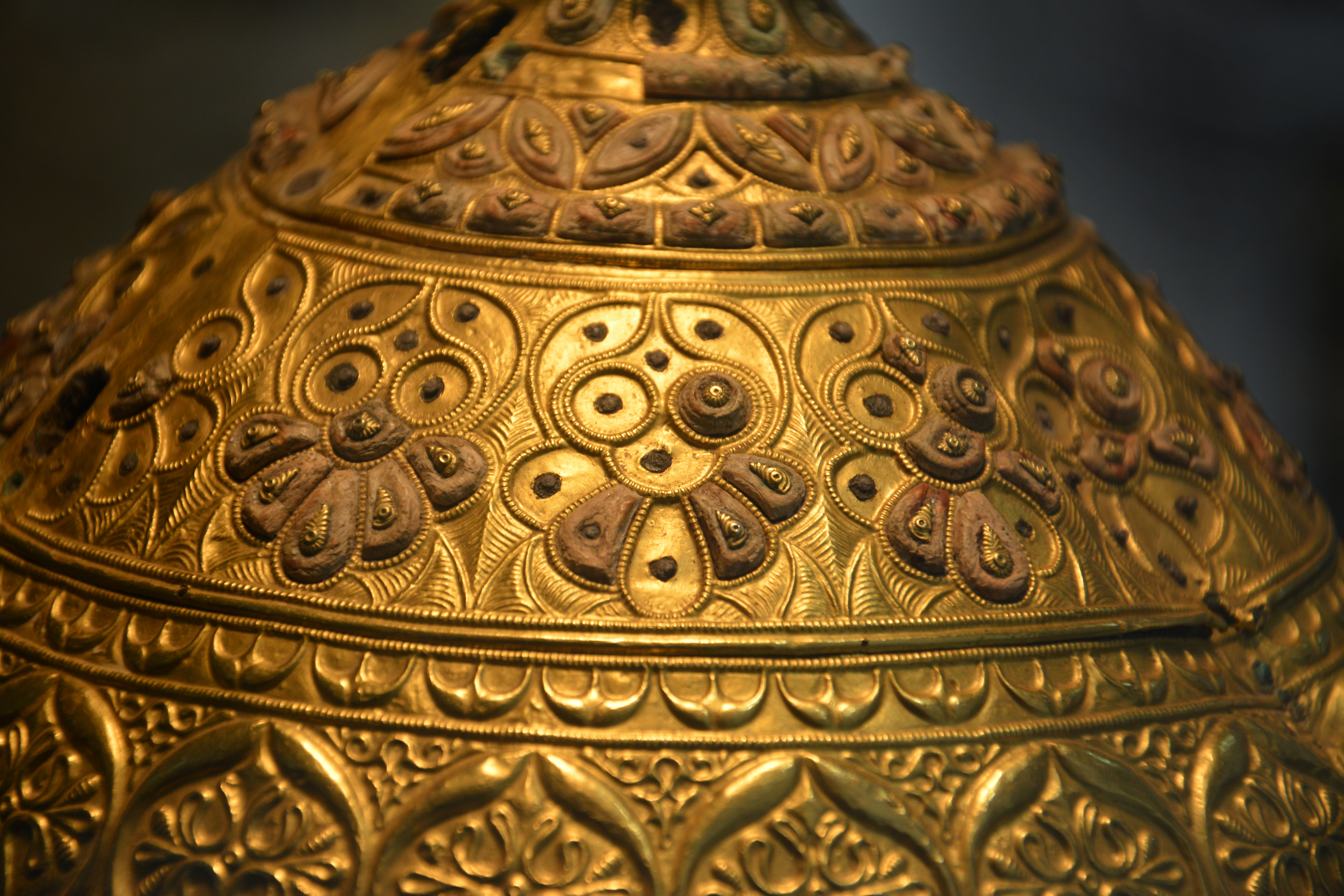
Decoration on the upper band

== Origin ==
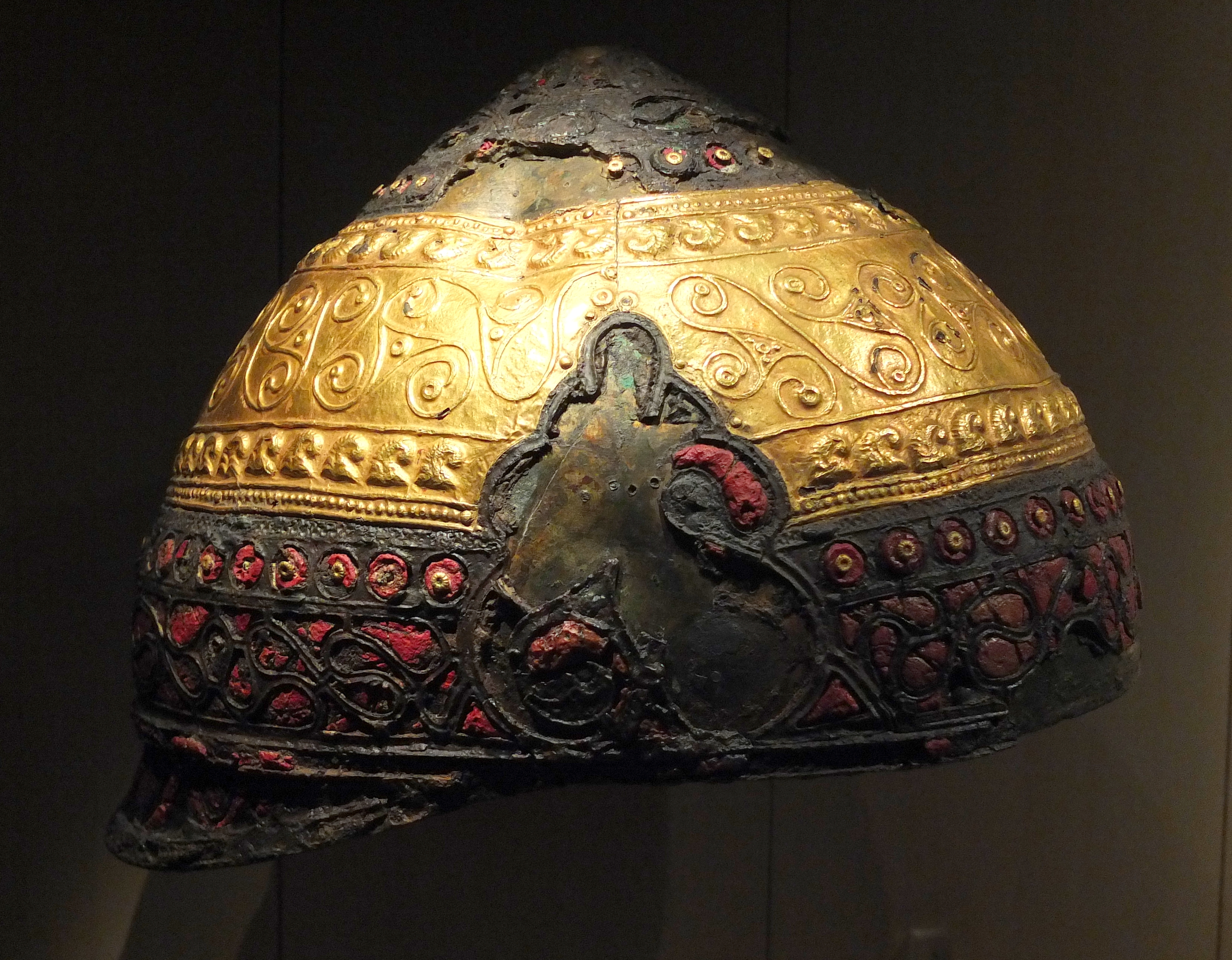
The Amfreville helmet, another Celtic prestige helmet from the Atlantic region.

Three main regions of the Celtic world have been proposed as the origin of the helmet. The first is the northern or central Adriatic region of Italy. Some think the new plant-style compositions were developed by Celtic craftsmen who settled in Italy and were influenced by Etruscan or Greek craftsmen with whom they had direct contact. The complexity of the montage and decoration may be explained by proximity to advanced metalworking centers such as those of Taranto or Campania. The objection is that all Celtic helmets from the period found in Italy were in one piece. Those with riveted neck guards have all been found in the Alps, the regions north of the Alps or the Atlantic region.

The second proposed region of origin is the North Alpine area that formed the ancient center of Celtic culture. The materials and techniques, and the general composition and decoration, seem to place the work among the best 5th century Celtic works from this region. The conical shape of the top of the helmet seems to be derived from Celtic helmets from the start of the second Iron Age. Where these were decorated, the decorations were in superimposed bands. Some details of the plant ornamentation are very similar to small Celtic ornaments from Austria, the Alpine regions and western Switzerland. This is the area where helmets with riveted neck guards are found most often.

The third possibility is that the helmet was made in the area where it was found. It is one of a small set of prestige helmets (Agris, Amfreville-sous-les-Monts, Saint-Jean-Trolimon, Montlaurès) that were mostly found in western France, the most famous being the completely decorated helmet of Amfreville-sous-les-Monts in the Eure. All were made of an iron or bronze cap covered with bands of another metal that were completely decorated. They have red ornaments, mostly coral. Riveted neck pieces are also found in this region.

Gold samples from various parts of the helmet are exceptionally pure, typically 99% gold, 0.5% silver and 0.2% copper. This degree of purity is very unusual in the ancient world. Analysis of Greek and Etruscan objects of the period shows much higher silver content. Most ancient objects with this degree of purity have been found to the southwest of the Loire, the region that includes Agris. The only comparable objects are 3rd century Celtic jewelry from this region. Probably the helmet was made in the West by craftsmen trained in the North Alpine School. The gold may well have come from mines in the west of the Massif Central, which had been in operation since at least the 5th century BC. Other high-quality works of Celtic art have been found in the Western region, so a local provenance is entirely possible.

== Sources ==
- Eluère, Christiane (1984). "Two Unique Golden Helmets". Gold Bulletin. 17 (3): 110–111. doi:10.1007/BF03216577.
- Éluère, Christiane; Gomez de Soto, José; Duval, Alain-René (1987). "Un chef-d'œuvre de l'orfèvrerie celtique : le casque d'Agris (Charente)". Bulletin de la Société Préhistorique Française (in French). 84 (1): 8–22. doi:10.3406/bspf.1987.9805.
- Gomez, J. (1983). "Nouvelles découvertes exceptionnelles de la Tène ancienne dans la grotte d'Agris, Charente". Bulletin de la Société Préhistorique Française (in French). 80 (7): 194–197. JSTOR 27918700.
- Gomez de Soto, José (2001). "Monde nord-alpin et/ou méditerranée? Actualités de l'art celtique de Gaule de l'ouest (V^{e} -IV^{e} s. av. J.-C.)". Revue Archéologique. Nouvelle série (in French). 1 (1): 212–218. JSTOR 41016785.
- Gomez De Soto, José; Verger, Stephane (2010). "Le casque d'Agris, chef-d'oeuvre de l'art celtique occidental" (PDF). L'Archéologue (in French).
- Green, Miranda (2012-12-06). The Celtic World. Routledge. ISBN 978-1-135-63243-4.
- Harding, D.W. (2007-06-11). The Archaeology of Celtic Art. Routledge. ISBN 978-1-134-26464-3.
- Koch, John T.; Minard, Antone (2012). The Celts: History, Life, and Culture. ABC-CLIO. ISBN 978-1-59884-964-6.
- Luccisano, Silvio (2005). Le casque d'Agris, tome 1 : Le sanctuaire interdit. Christophe Robakowski (Couleurs), Laurent Libessart (Dessins). Assor BD. ISBN 978-2951666054. ASIN 2951666055.
