= Agriș (disambiguation) =

Agriș may refer to the following places in Romania:

- Agriș, a commune in Satu Mare County
- Agriș, a village in the commune Iara, Cluj County
- Agriș, a tributary of the Baraolt in Covasna County
- Agriș, a tributary of the Cormoș in Covasna County
- Agriș, a tributary of the Iara in Cluj County
- Agriș (Luț), a tributary of the Luț in Mureș County
- Agriș, a tributary of the Moravița in Timiș County
- Agriș, a tributary of the Mureș in Mureș County
- Agriș, a tributary of the Nera in Caraș-Severin County

== See also ==
- Agrișu (disambiguation)
- Agris, a French commune in the Charente department
- AGRIS (International System for Agricultural Science and Technology), a global public domain database
