= Agris =

- Commune
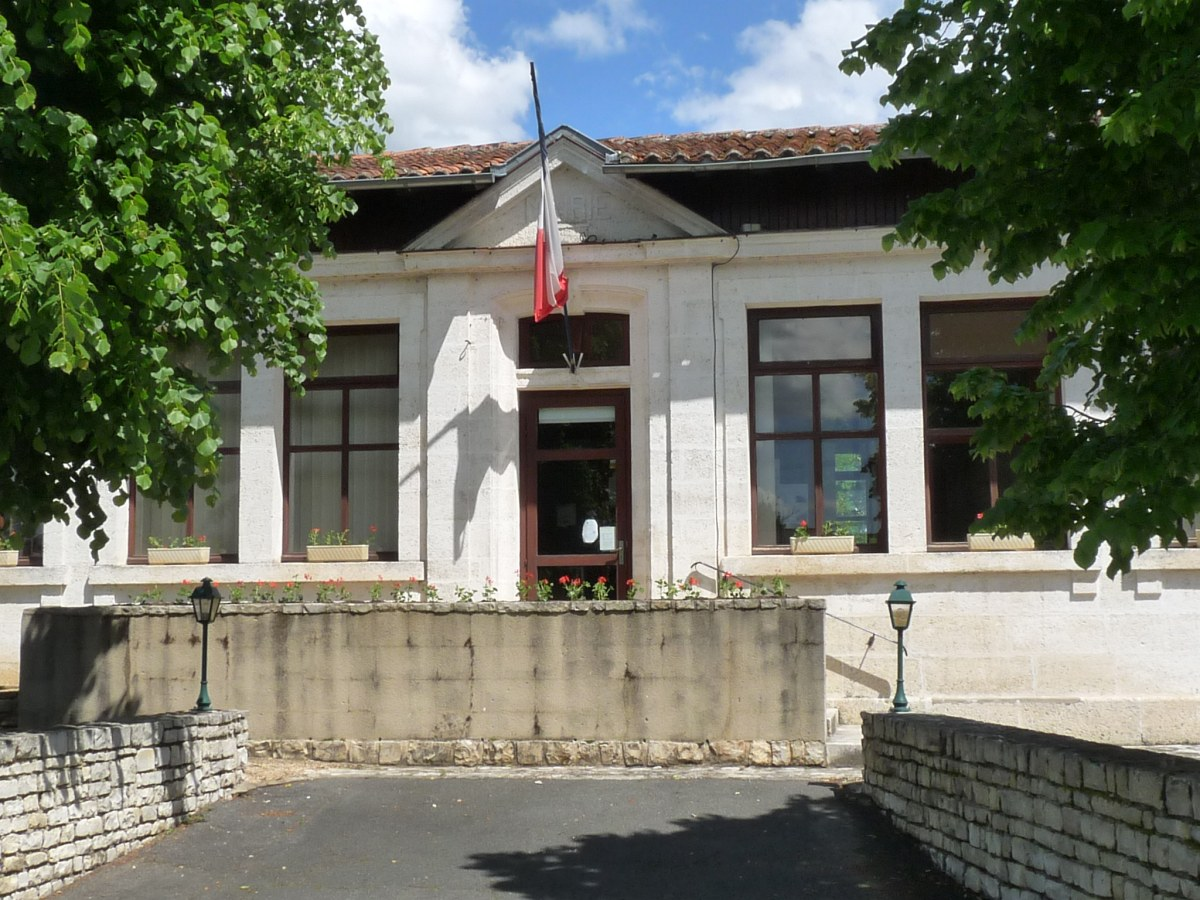
- Town Hall
- Location of Agris
- Location within France Location within Nouvelle-Aquitaine
- Coordinates: 45°46′32″N 0°20′09″E
- Country: France
- Region: Nouvelle-Aquitaine
- Department: Charente
- Arrondissement: Angoulême
- Canton: Val de Tardoire
- Intercommunality: La Rochefoucauld-Porte du Périgord

Government
  - Mayor (2020–2026): Patrick Piveteau
- Area^{1}: 18.74 km^{2} (7.24 sq mi)
- Elevation: 83 m (272 ft)
- Highest elevation: 134 m (440 ft)
- Lowest elevation: 70 m (230 ft)
- Population (2023): 891
  - Density: 47.5/km^{2} (123/sq mi)
- Time zone: UTC+01:00 (CET)
  - Summer (DST): UTC+02:00 (CEST)
- INSEE/Postal code: 16003 /16110
- ^{1} French Land Register data, which excludes lakes, ponds, glaciers > 1 km^{2} (0.386 sq mi or 247 acres) and river estuaries.

Agris (French pronunciation: [aɡʁi]; Occitan: Agrís) is a commune in the Charente department in the Nouvelle-Aquitaine region of southwestern France.

The inhabitants of the commune are known as Agritois or Agritoises, alternatively Agritauds or Agritaudes

== Geography ==
=== Location and access ===
Agris is located 19 km north-east of Angoulême and 5 km north-west of La Rochefoucauld by the D390 road which passes through the village or the D6 which passes through Pont-d'Agris.

The town is also traversed by the D11 from Vars to Chasseneuil-sur-Bonnieure and the D12 to Angoulême as well as by minor departmental roads: the D175 from Pont-d'Agris to Saint-Claud by the Bois de Bel-Air, the D40 to the nearby commune of La Rochette, and the D88 (called the Road of the Duchess) from La Rochefoucauld to Jauldes and Tourriers.

Agris is also 10 km south-west of Chasseneuil-sur-Bonnieure and 16 km south-east of Mansle.

The nearest railway station is at La Rochefoucauld which is served by the TER between Angoulême and Limoges. Angoulême Airport is 10 km south-west of the commune.

=== Hamlets and localities ===
The commune has many hamlets to the north-west of the village in the Tardoire valley. The main ones are Pont-d'Agris, located on the right bank and at the crossroads of the D6 and D11 and La Grange located on the left bank and on the D11 up to the heights of the village. On the right bank there is also the Les Camus, les Fougères, la Côte, la Brousse, les Garrauds, and on the left bank le Monac, chez Goby, les Martonnauds, les Chevilloux, which are almost part of the village. There are also les Vieilles Vaures in the south and les Treize Vents in the north

There are also many farms. The part of the forest west of the village is uninhabited.

=== Geology and terrain ===
The soil consists of limestone dating from the middle and upper Jurassic period (Callovian to Kimmeridgian from east to west). The plateau east of the Tardoire Valley is covered with alterite and flinty clay from the Massif Central close by (10 km east) and deposited during the Tertiary period. The valley is covered with alluvium and along the edges with sand and gravel terraces dating from the Quaternary period.

In the Braconne Forest there are excavations of Fosse Limousine, Fosse Mobile and Fosse Rode, (Note: The Fosse Dufay where Trou des Duffaits is found is located at La Rochette, 100 metres north of the commune) which opens up in the form of a winding gallery in the upper reef. These collapses, sinkholes, galleries, and concretions form a caving site which is part of the La Rochefoucauld karst.

The relief of the commune is that of a low plateau sloping gently towards the valley of the Tardoire, with an average altitude of 110 m. The highest point is at an altitude of 134 m to the south-west in the Braconne forest near Gros Fayant. The lowest point is 70 m located on the Tardoire opposite the town of La Rochette. The village is 80 m above sea level.

=== Hydrography ===
The commune is traversed by the Tardoire and Bandiat Valleys.

Bandiat Valley is almost always dry in summer because its waters are absorbed by the successive sinkholes of the La Rochefoucauld karst so never reach the Tardoire Valley. The base of the Valley is nothing more than a ditch along a path between the Vieilles Vaures and the village. In winter the water still reaches the Vieilles Vaures but quickly sinks underground.

Tardoire Valley is also often dry in summer for the same reasons.

=== Climate ===
As in three-quarters of the department in the south and west, the climate is oceanic Aquitaine.

=== Dialect Area ===
The commune is in the Limousin region and marks the boundary with the Saintongeais local dialect (to the West).

== Toponymy ==
There are two hypotheses for the origin of the name Agris:

1. Agris comes from the Latin Acrisium fundum or villa Acrisii meaning that the village was built around the property of a rich Gallo-Roman named Acrisius
2. Agris comes from the Latin ager meaning "field"

In the Middle Ages, Agris was called Agresio.

== History ==
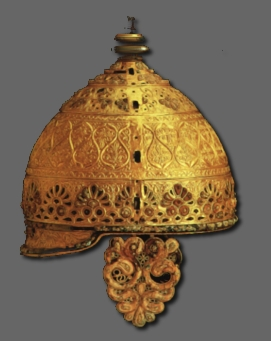
The Agris Helmet

The remains of eight people have been exhumed (five adults and three children) who were hunter-gatherers from the Mesolithic period around 7000 BC.

Aerial photos reveal traces of ancient occupation in an undetermined era.

It is certain that the occupation of the site was very ancient as evidenced by the discovery of the Agris Helmet, a ceremonial Celtic helmet dated from the 4th century BC. which was found in 1981 during archaeological excavations in Perrats Cave. This site's primary occupation dated to the Mesolithic period in 7000 BC. and was reused from the Neolithic period in the Bronze Age to the second Iron Age in the Roman period and also during the Middle Ages.

In the same site in the Perrats Cave pottery of the second Iron Age was found.

== Administration ==
Agris was created in 1793 as part of the canton of Jandes (Note: It is spelled this way on the Cassini website but it is probably meant to be Jaudes.) and the district of La Rochefoucauld but in 1801 changed to the Canton of La Rochefoucauld in the Arrondissement of Angoulême.

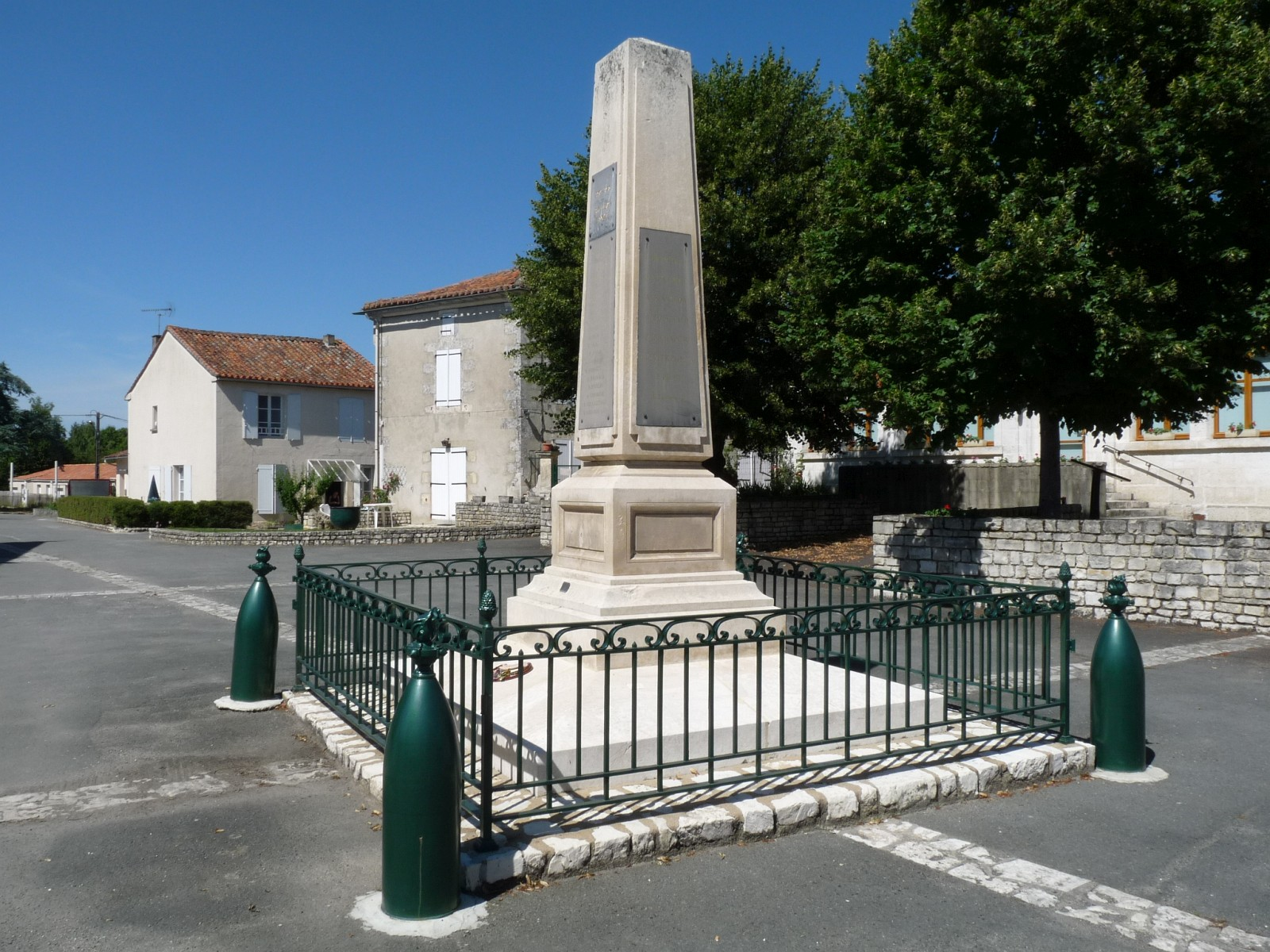
The War Memorial

List of Successive Mayors of Agris

From	To	Name	Party	Position
2001	2008	Jacky Brandy		
2008	2020	Christian Vimpère	ind.	Farmer
2020	2026	Patrick Piveteau		

== Population ==
Historical population

Year	Pop.	±% p.a.
1800	1,129	—
1806	1,116	−0.19%
1821	1,181	+0.38%
1831	1,389	+1.64%
1841	1,389	+0.00%
1846	1,457	+0.96%
1851	1,472	+0.21%
1856	1,350	−1.72%
1861	1,290	−0.91%
1866	1,308	+0.28%
1872	1,212	−1.26%
1876	1,204	−0.17%
1881	1,209	+0.08%
1886	1,182	−0.45%
1891	1,140	−0.72%
1896	1,026	−2.09%
1901	1,120	+1.77%
1906	1,125	+0.09%

Year	Pop.	±% p.a.
1911	1,108	−0.30%
1921	833	−2.81%
1926	795	−0.93%
1931	759	−0.92%
1936	788	+0.75%
1946	699	−1.19%
1954	680	−0.34%
1962	749	+1.22%
1968	740	−0.20%
1975	789	+0.92%
1982	811	+0.39%
1990	732	−1.27%
1999	711	−0.32%
2007	804	+1.55%
2012	833	+0.71%
2017	857	+0.57%
2023	891	+0.65%

Source: EHESS and INSEE

Agris had its peak population in 1851 then lost 43% of its population from 1851 to 1921. Since then the population has stabilized around 700-900 people.

== Economy ==
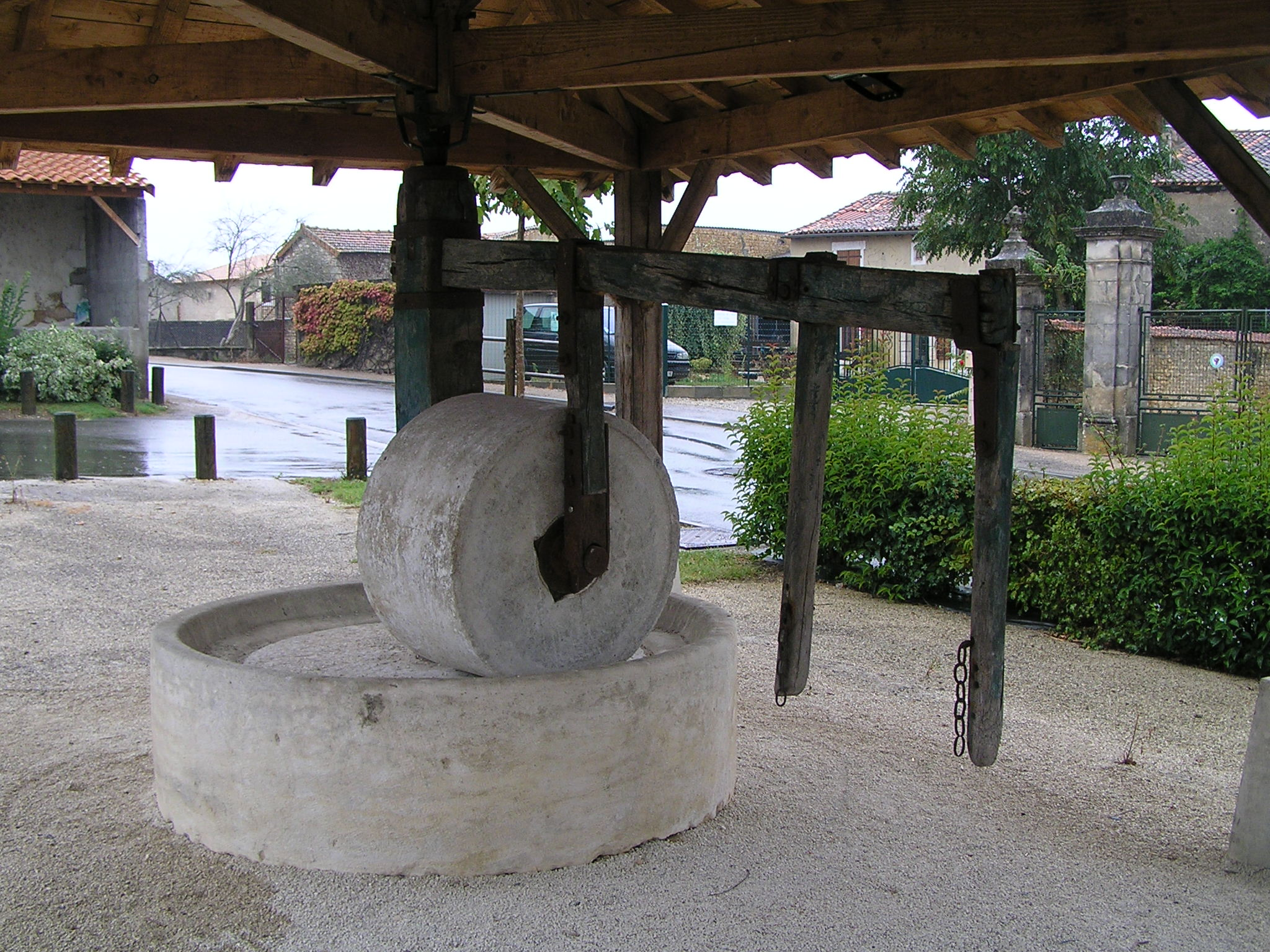
Grain Grinding Wheel

During the 19th century three stone quarries were operating in the commune: Chez les Foucauds in La Moussière and Chez les Fouilloux.

=== Shops ===
Two grocery stores, a tobacco shop, a restaurant, a bakery and a hairdresser.

=== Trades ===
A large number of tradesmen and entrepreneurs are present in the commune: electrician, motor garage, carpenter, mason, painter, plasterer-tiler, plumber, and agricultural workers.

=== Tourism ===
There are three rural cottages, with two open all year.

== Facilities, services and local life ==
Agris has a post office.

=== Education ===
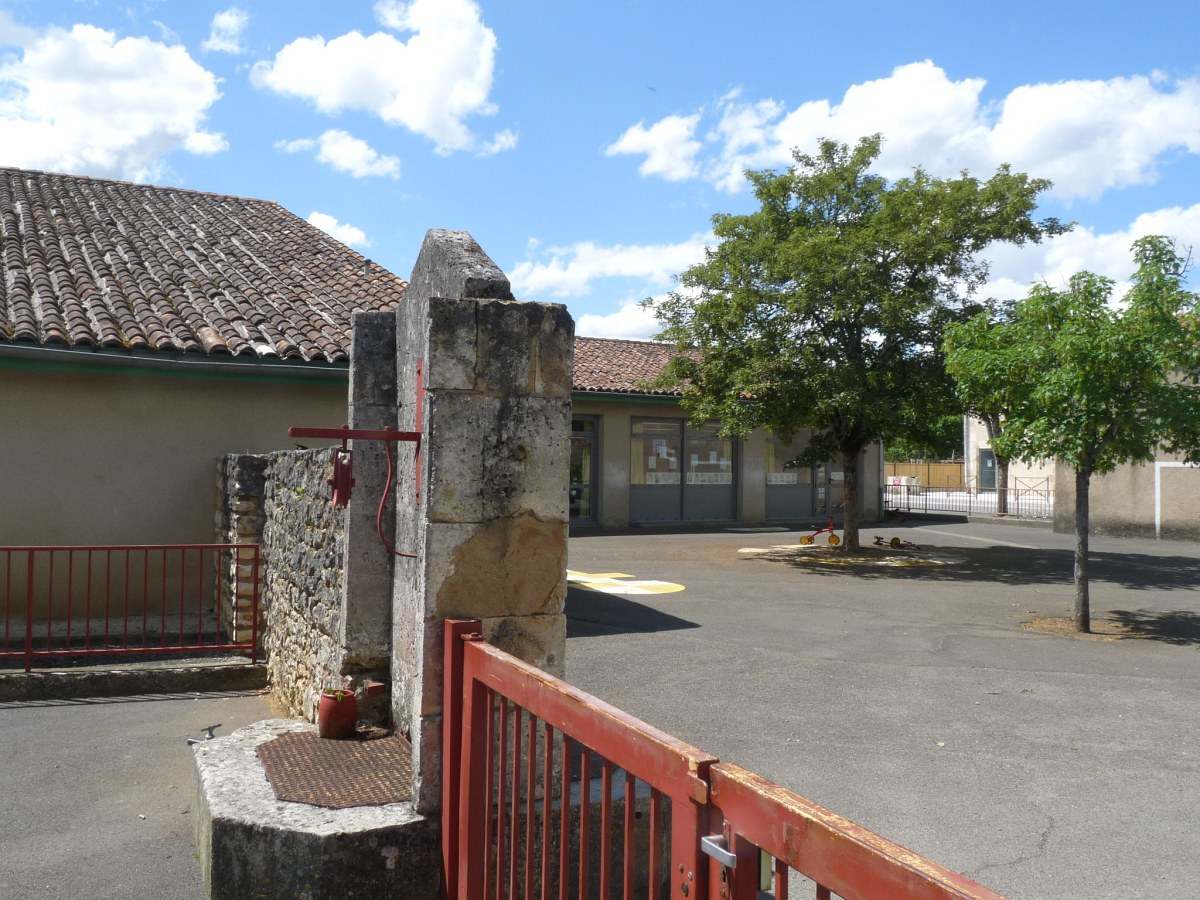
The Primary School

The school is an intercommunal teaching group between Agris and La Rochette. Agris has the Primary School and La Rochette only the elementary school. The Agris school is located in the village.

=== Sport and activities ===
The US football club of Agris plays in the Marc Labrousse Stadium.

There is also an association for playing tennis and pétanque, an equestrian centre located in Chez Pelet, a quad bike club, a motor-cycle club, a hunting society, a club for seniors, and an association of parents.

The commune has a leisure centre and a library.

There is also an autocross circuit that hosted the championship of France several times but it has been closed since 2010.

=== Health ===
There are two general practitioners and one home help service.

== Culture and heritage ==
=== Civil heritage ===
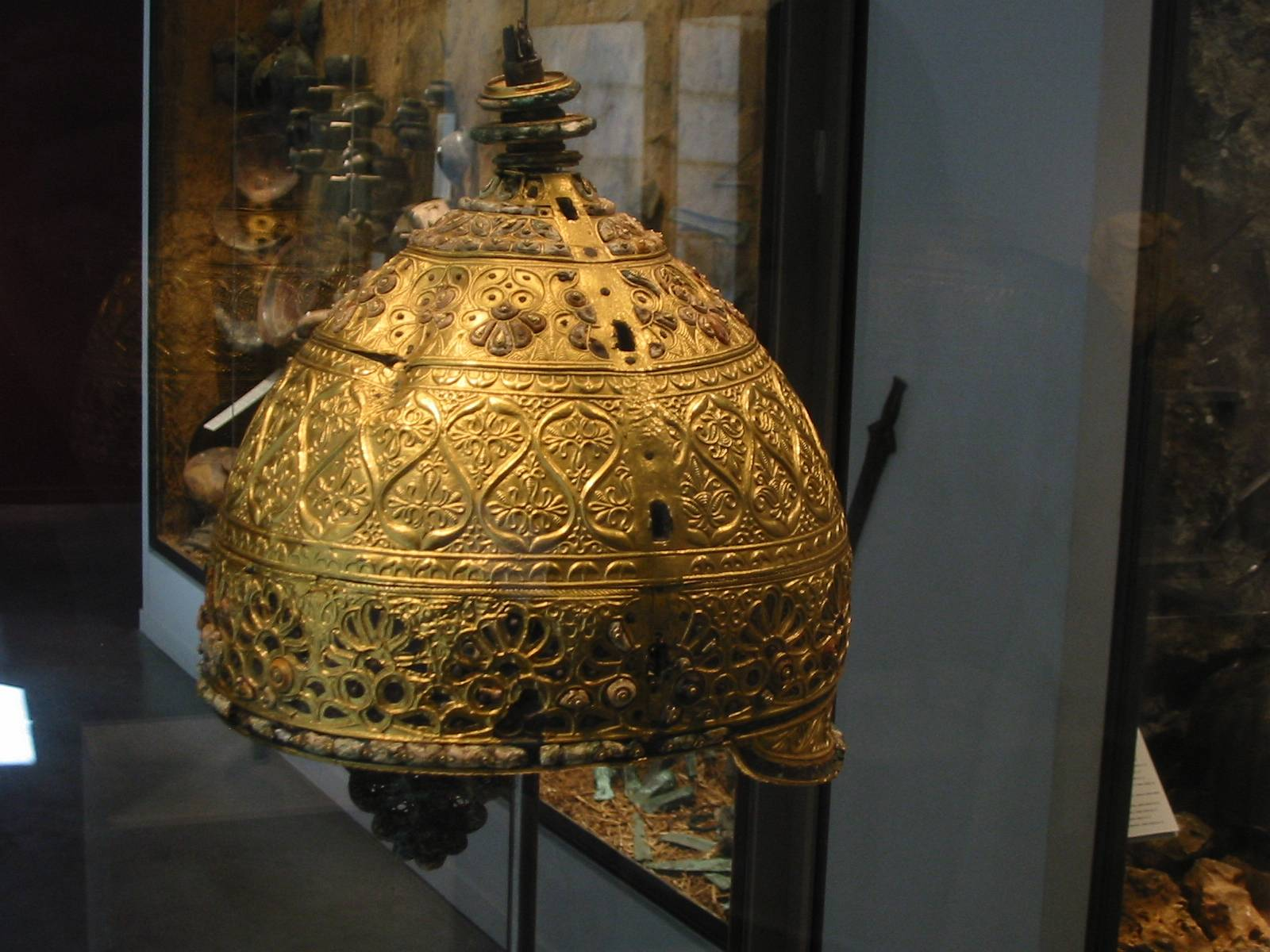
The Agris helmet at the Angoulême museum

- The Casque d'Agris (Agris helmet) is a ceremonial Celtic helmet dating from the 4th century BC which was found in 1981 during archaeological excavations in the Perrats Cave, a Late Bronze Age site. The helmet was made with a shell of riveted iron covering the neck and gold plating on bronze decorated with plant motifs. It is displayed in the Angoulême museum.
- The Fouilloux site includes a moated structure dating to the Middle Bronze Age widely open to the west where stone ballast fills the moat.
- The Statue of the seated god of Agris shows the existence of Gallo-Roman "leftist gods".
- The Chateau of Fouilloux has a portal and Puyssaguet enclosure which are notable.

=== Religious Heritage ===
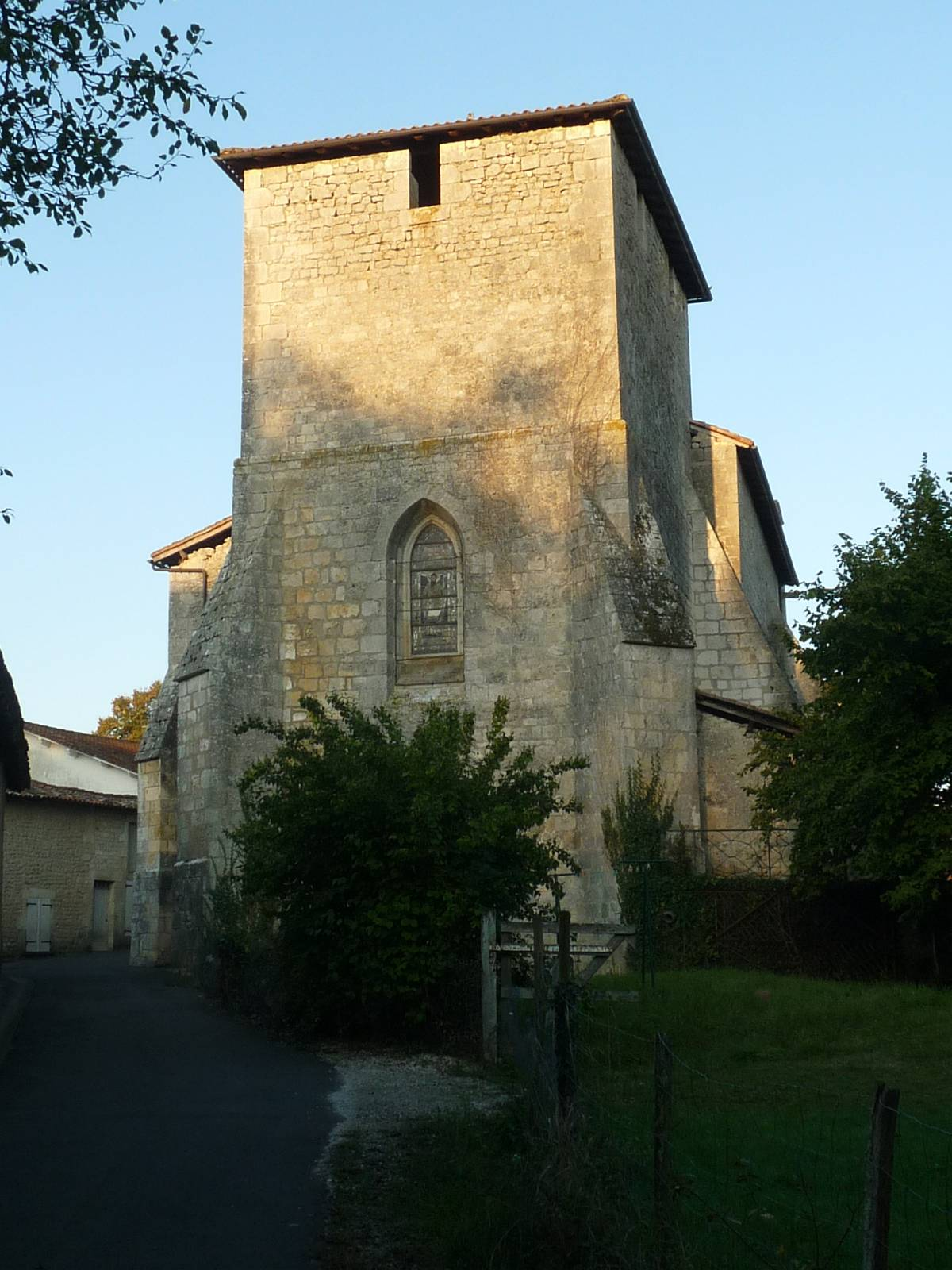
Church of Saint-Caprais of Agris

The commune has two sites that are registered as historical monuments:

- The Croix de la Tuilière (Tuilière Cross) is a wayside cross located at the intersection of the local road from Granges to Le Bourg and the local road from Granges to Le Chevilloux.
- The Parish Church of Saint Caprais (12th century). It depended on the priory of Saint-Florent de La Rochefoucauld. The church contains three items that are registered as historical objects:
  - A Harmonium (1860)
  - A Winged Tabernacle (17th century)
  - A Stoup for holy water and an Aspergillum (18th century)

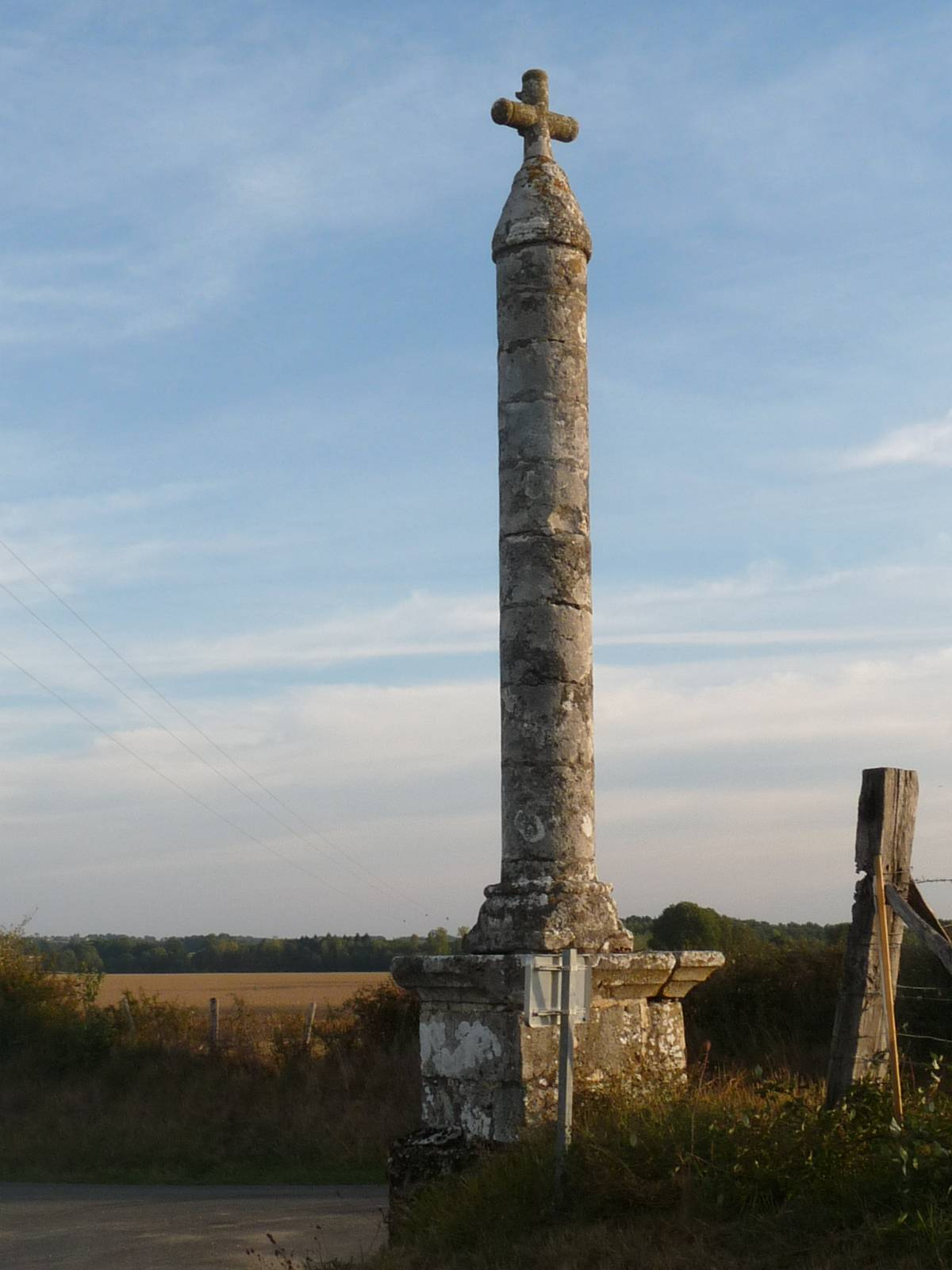
Tuilière Cross

=== Environmental heritage ===
The Braconne Forest, the Tardoire Valley, and the Bandiat Valley are of great interest for flora and fauna. They are a Natura 2000 zone.

=== Legend ===
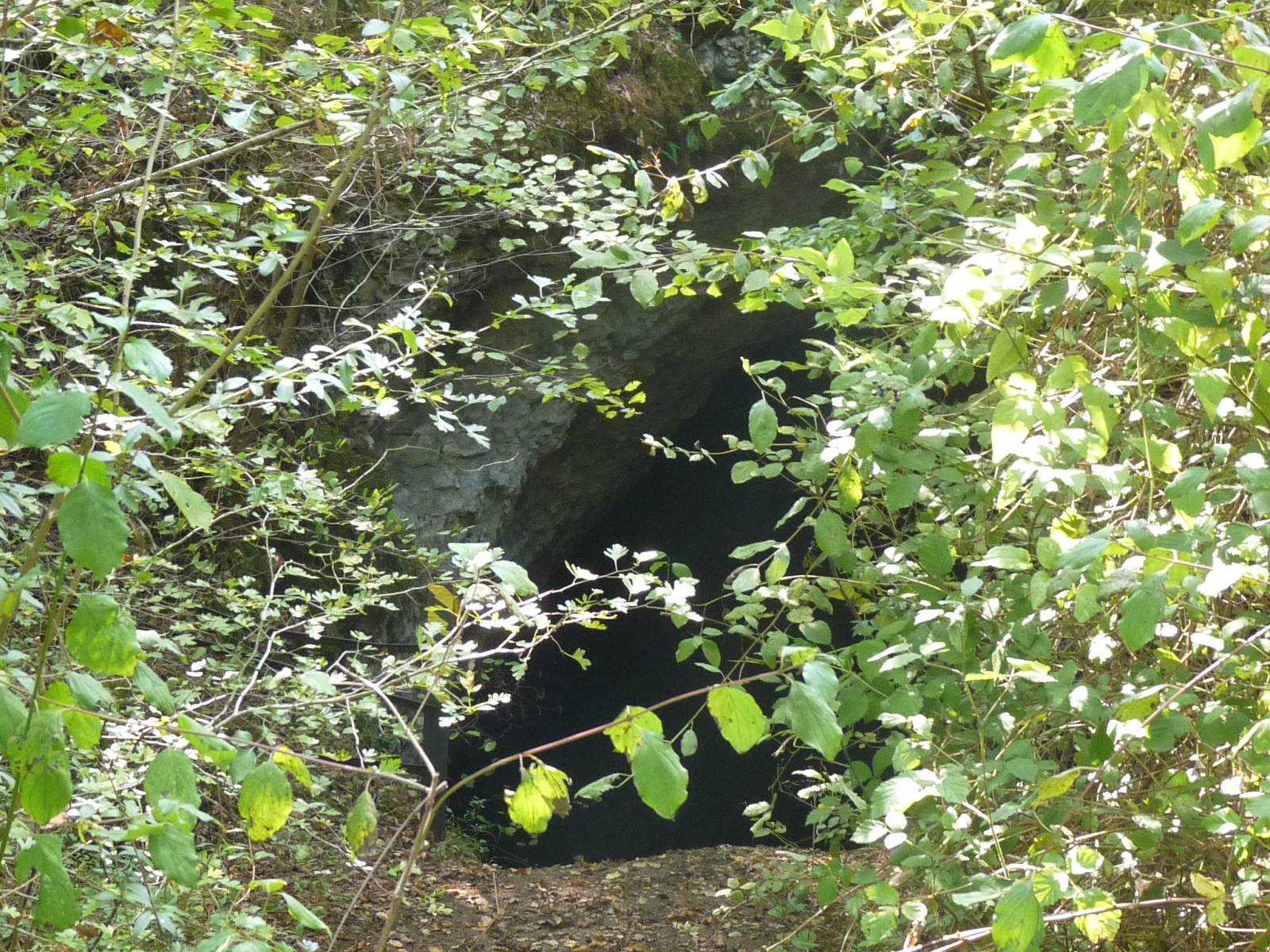
Entry to the Fosse mobile

Legend of the mobile pit: a man who killed his father and wanting to hide his corpse wandered all night to find this pit which concealed itself and moved constantly to avoid being complicit in the patricide. Exhausted, the man surrendered to police of La Rochefoucauld in the morning.

== See also ==
- Cantons of the Charente department
