= La Rochette, Charente =

La Rochette
- Commune
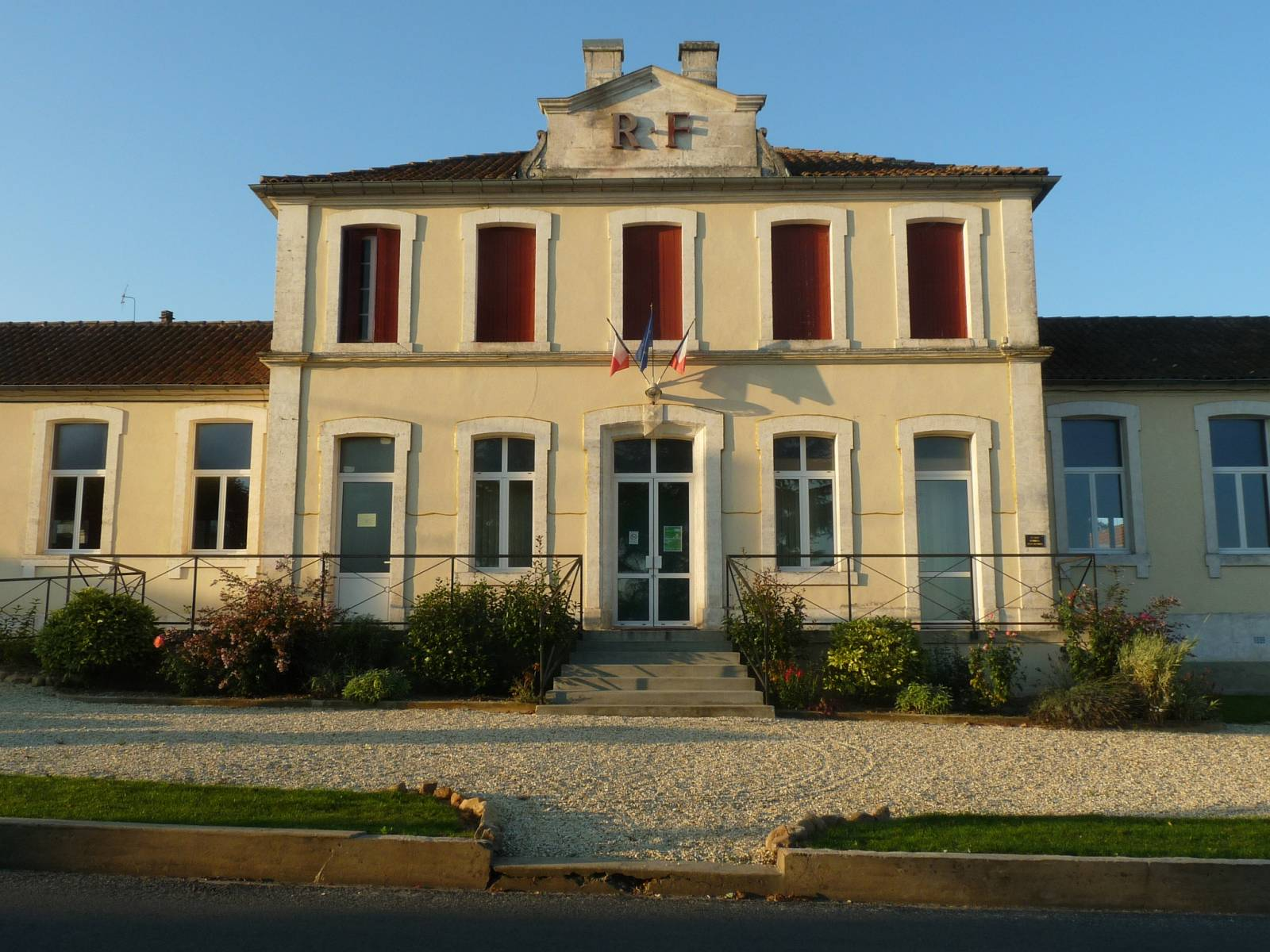
- The town hall in La Rochette
- Location of La Rochette
- Location within France Location within Nouvelle-Aquitaine
- Coordinates: 45°48′07″N 0°18′53″E
- Country: France
- Region: Nouvelle-Aquitaine
- Department: Charente
- Arrondissement: Angoulême
- Canton: Val de Tardoire
- Intercommunality: La Rochefoucauld - Porte du Périgord

Government
  - Mayor (2020–2026): Vincent Ringeade
- Area^{1}: 10.99 km^{2} (4.24 sq mi)
- Elevation: 91 m (299 ft)
- Highest elevation: 115 m (377 ft)
- Lowest elevation: 66 m (217 ft)
- Population (2023): 523
  - Density: 47.6/km^{2} (123/sq mi)
- Time zone: UTC+01:00 (CET)
  - Summer (DST): UTC+02:00 (CEST)
- INSEE/Postal code: 16282 /16110
- ^{1} French Land Register data, which excludes lakes, ponds, glaciers > 1 km^{2} (0.386 sq mi or 247 acres) and river estuaries.

La Rochette (French pronunciation: [la ʁɔʃɛt]) is a commune in the Charente department in southwestern France.

In 2016, an ancient hunter-gatherer that was excavated at La Rochette was found to carry the mtDNA haplogroup M. The Late Pleistocene specimen was dated to 28,000 years ago.

== Population ==
Historical population
Year	Pop.	±% p.a.
1968	401	—
1975	422	+0.73%
1982	436	+0.47%
1990	445	+0.26%
1999	442	−0.08%
2007	546	+2.68%
2012	547	+0.04%
2017	533	−0.52%
2023	523	−0.32%
Source: INSEE

== See also ==
- Communes of the Charente department
