= Musée d'Angoulême =

Museum in France

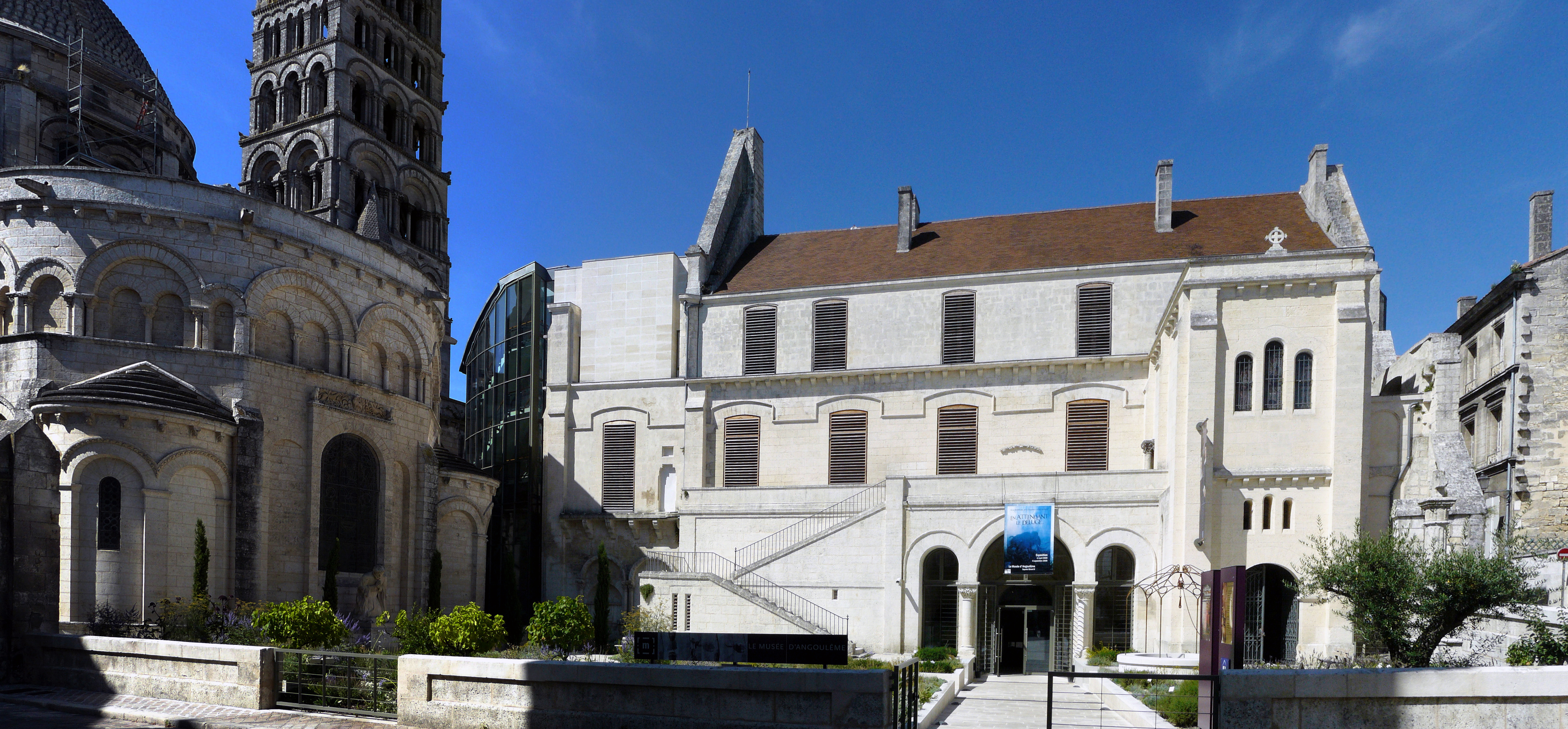
- Museum (right) and cathedral (left)

- Location within France
- Established: 1920
- Location: Square Girard II (rue Corneille), 16000 Angoulême
- Coordinates: 45.64917°N 0.15222°E
- Type: Archaeology, fine arts, African and Pacific arts
- Accreditation: Musée de France
- Website: musee-angouleme.fr/practical-information/

The Musée d'Angoulême, formerly the Musée des beaux-arts d'Angoulême, is a public museum in Angoulême, France. Located beside the Angoulême Cathedral in the heart of the historical center of the city, it is classified as a Musée de France, and has important archaeological, ethnographic and artistic collections. It also hosts temporary exhibitions and conferences.

== Origins ==
The Musée d'Angoulême has its origin in an 1838 donation of ten paintings to the city of Angoulême by François Rainguet. Starting in 1868 the French government began to send paintings that had been exhibited in the Paris Salons to Angoulême, where they were first stored in the attic of the old city hall. On 15 August 1869 a museum was opened on the ground floor of the new city hall, where it remained until 1920. On 12 September 1920 the present museum opened in two wings of the former residence of the Bishop of Angoulême. It featured paintings, sculpture and archaeology. The administrative wing continued to be used for other purposes.

== History ==
Dr Jules Lhomme (1857–1934) bequeathed a major collection of works of art and ethnography from around the world to the city. The display of this collection was inaugurated by the sculptor Émile Peyronnet, then the curator of the museum, on 17 January 1935. This is one of the best French collections of African and Oceanian works both in terms of number and of quality. In 1983 the museum opened in the whole building after renovation of the wing that had formerly been occupied by the School of Fine Arts. The entire museum was renovated between 2005 and 2008, reopening on 1 March 2008 with 1,700 square metres (18,000 sq ft) of exhibition space.

As of 2015 the Musée d'Angoulême was open all year round from Tuesday to Sunday each week, with no charge for admission. The museum provided tours, workshops and conferences.

== Archaeological and Historical Museum of the Charente ==
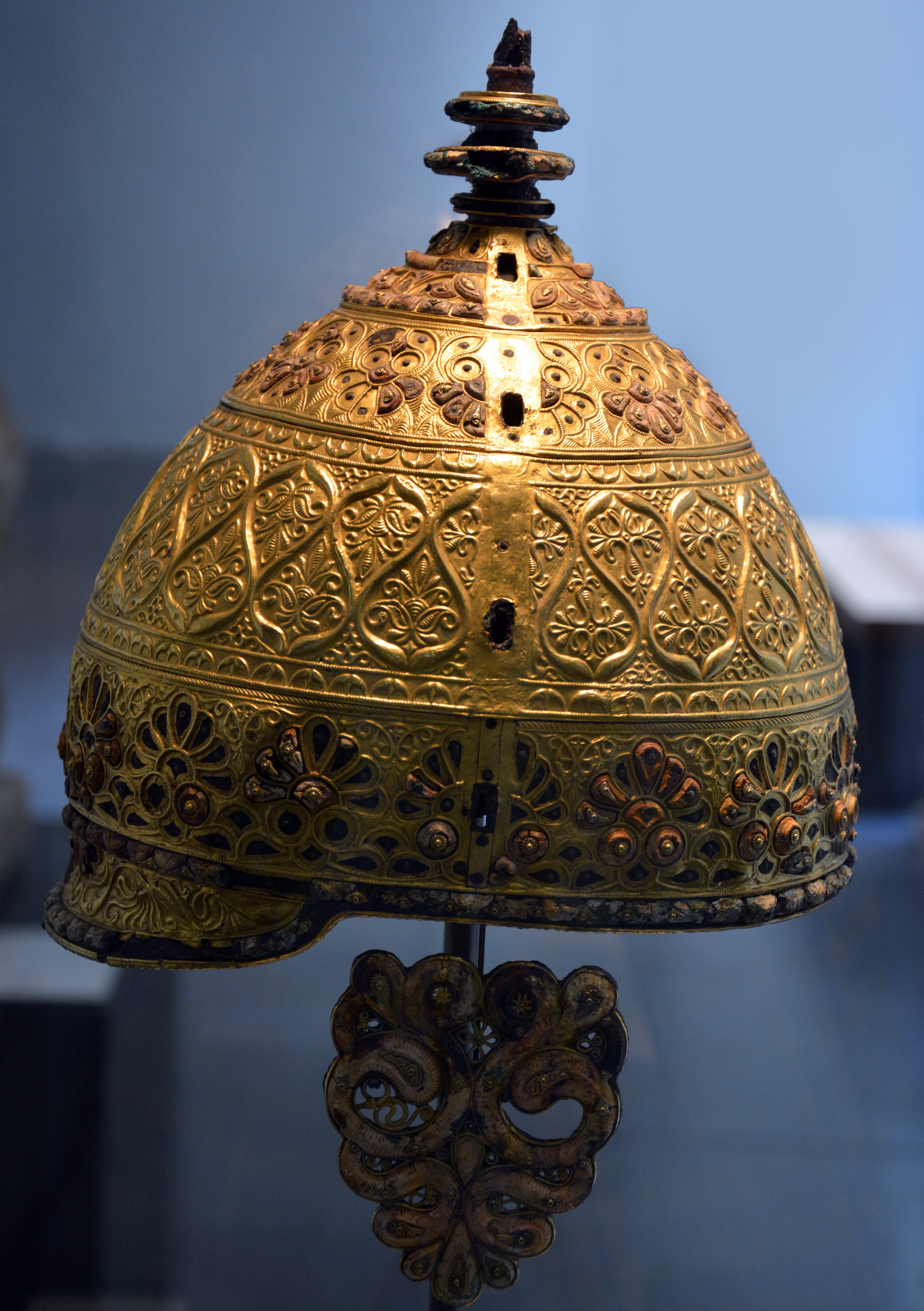
Casque d'Agris

The Musée d'Angoulême collection is predated by the collection of the Archaeological and Historical Society of the Charente, which in 1845 established a collection in the former castle of the counts of Angoulême. When the castle was demolished to make way for the new city hall the collection was moved to the basement of the Palace of Justice, then in 1876 to a large room on the ground floor of the new city hall. After World War II (1939–45) it was moved to a large house on the Rue de Montmoreau.

The city's collection is much richer in prehistory and protohistory, but the Society has a much richer lapidary collection and many medieval and renaissance artifacts such as pottery, enamels, glass, pewter and so on.

The total renovation of the Musée d'Angoulême in 2005–08 gave it room for a major gallery on Prehistory and Early History and space to present ancient sculptures and late 10th and early 11th century objects excavated from the Andone Castrum. The Society decided to entrust several major pieces to the city. These included various paleolithic objects, some neolithic ceramics, selected bronzes from Vénat (Saint-Yrieix-sur-Charente), two Gallic statues from Jarnax and several Gallo-Roman statues.

== Collections ==
The Musée d'Angoulême has a collection of archaeological objects from the Charente river basin. The display presents the geology of the region and discoveries from the different prehistoric cultures, the Roman period and from later times.

The Casque d'Agris, a ceremonial Gallic helmet from around 500 BC, is a particularly interesting object. The collection bequeathed to the museum by Dr Jules Lhomme in 1934 includes works of art and ethnography from Africa (Maghreb, Sub-Saharan Africa, Madagascar); Asia (India, Indonesia, Indochina, China and Japan); Oceania (Melanesia, Polynesia) and America (Peru, Mexico, Brazil, Canada, Alaska). The museum also has a collection of paintings, sculptures, ceramics and weapons from the Charente from the 16th to early 20th centuries.

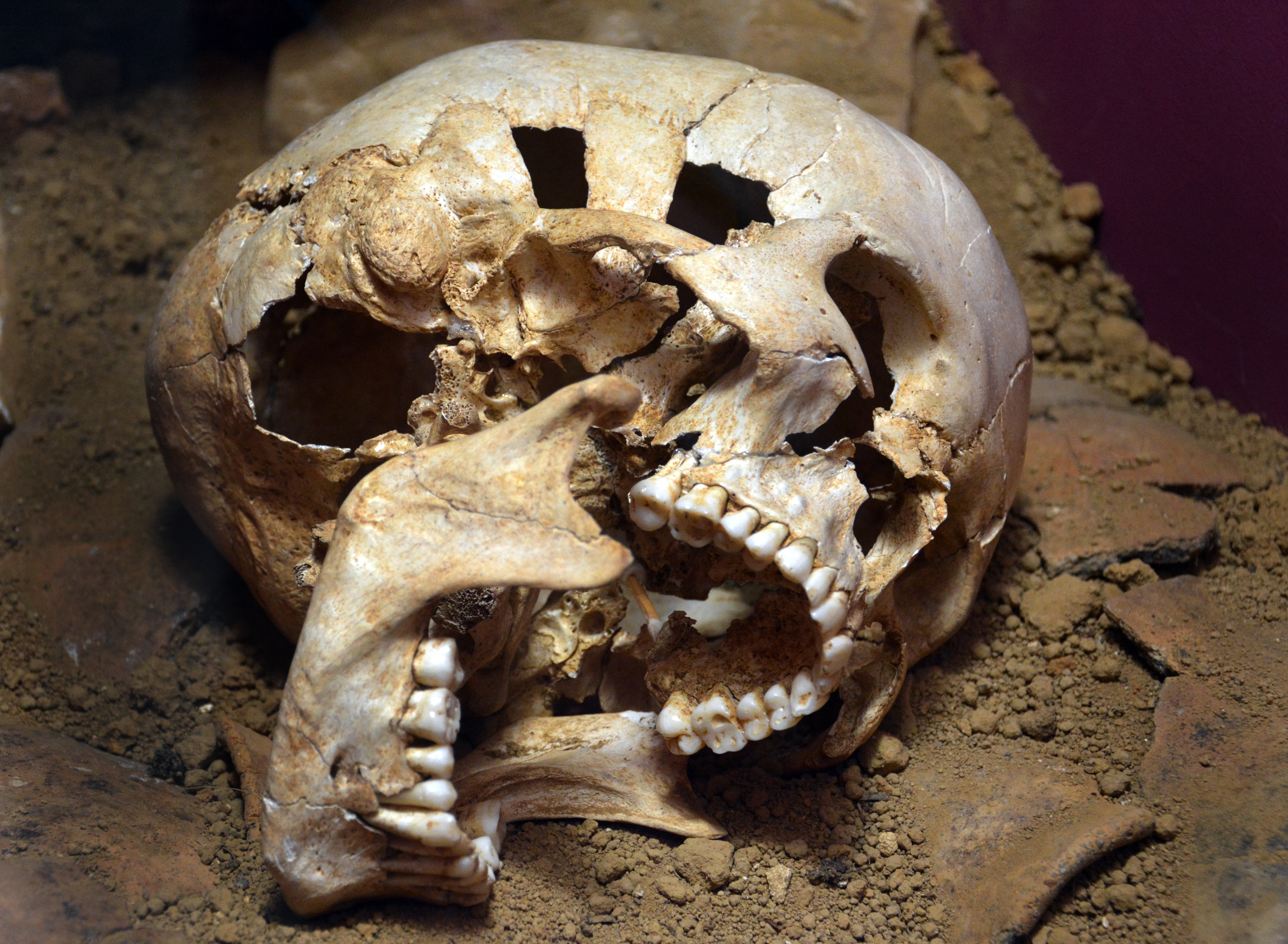
Severed head of a young woman, middle Bronze Age

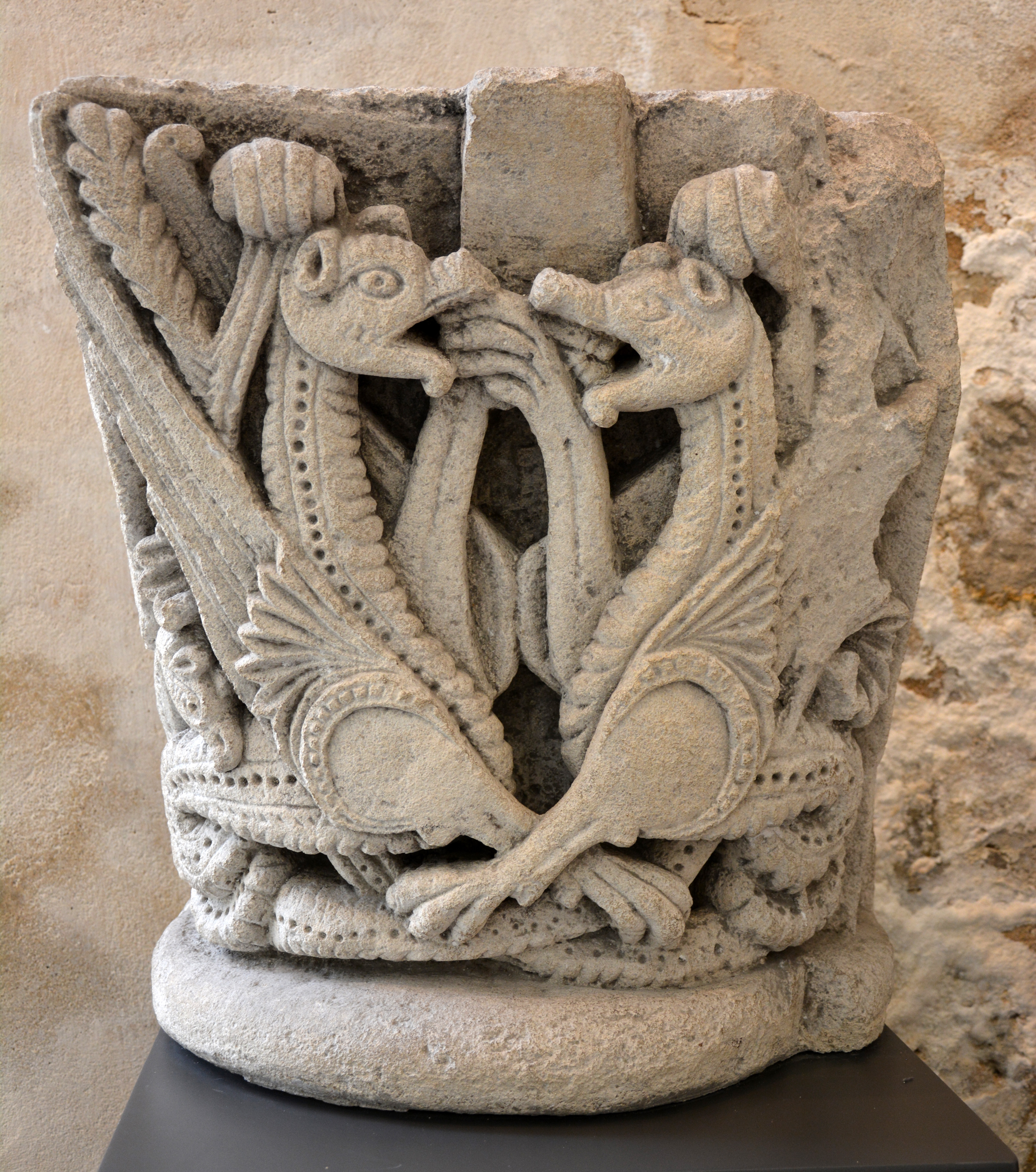
Twelfth-century capital from Abbey of Saint-Cybard

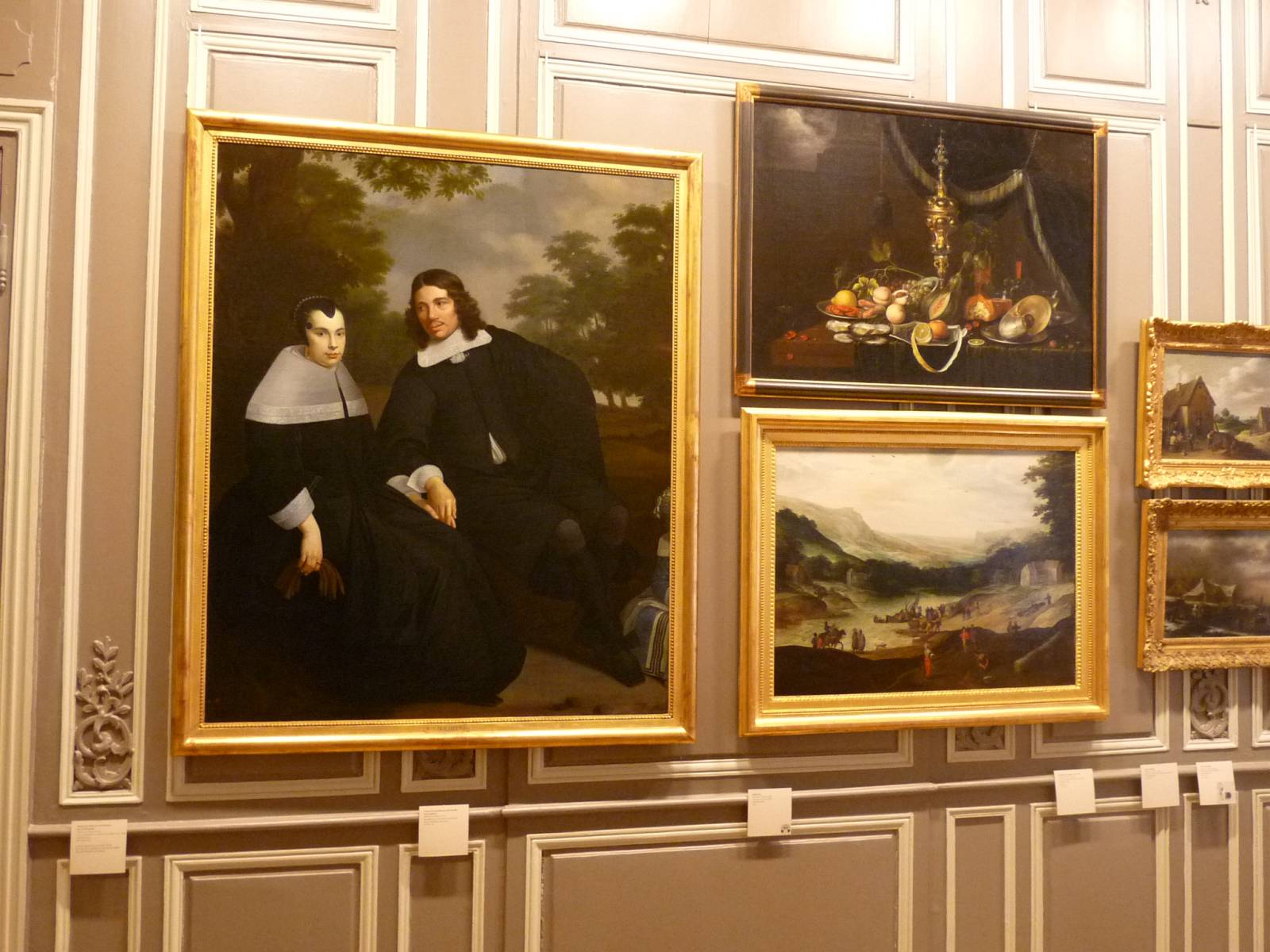
Seventeenth-century Netherlands paintings

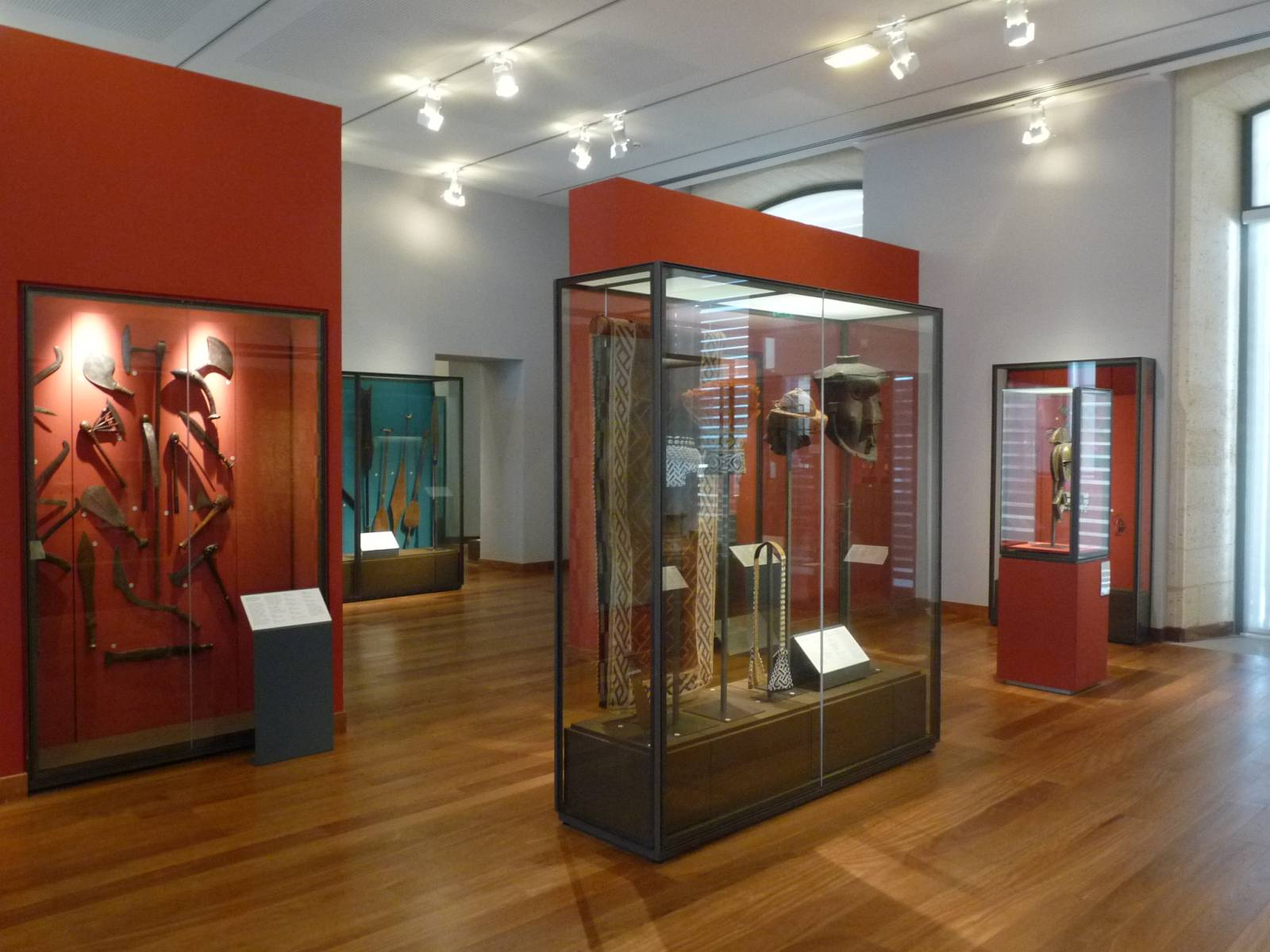
African and Oceanic exhibit

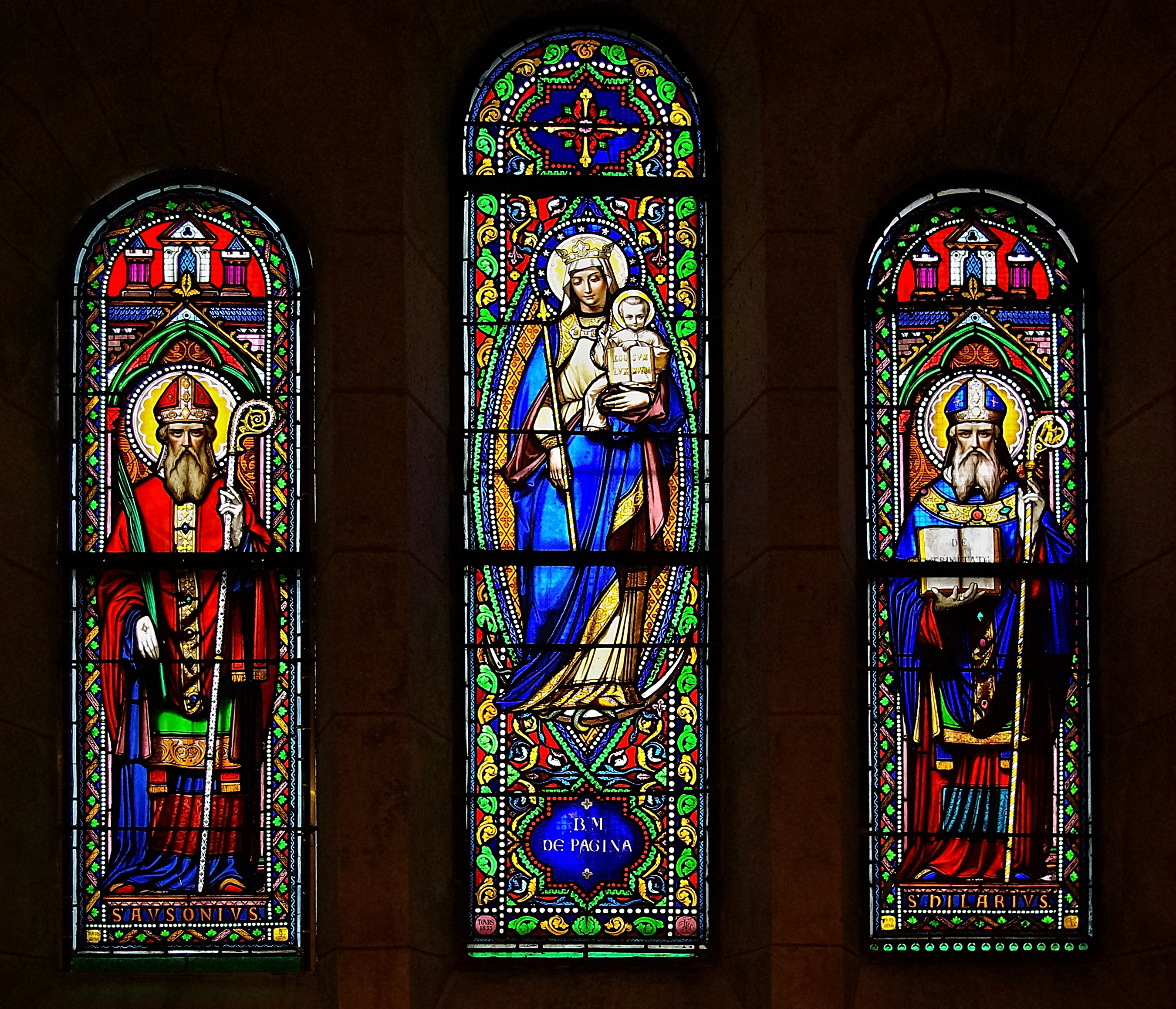
Nineteenth-century stained glass windows
