= Ağrı, Azerbaijan =

Ağrı
- Municipality
- Location within Azerbaijan
- Coordinates: 38°55′N 45°56′E
- Country: Azerbaijan
- Autonomous republic: Nakhchivan
- District: Ordubad

Population (2005)
  - Total: 291
- Time zone: UTC+4 (AZT)

Ağrı (also, Aghry) is a village in the Ordubad District of Nakhchivan, Azerbaijan. It is part of the municipality of the Vənənd village. The village is located in the right side of the Ordubad-Unus highway, 15 km away from the district center, on the left banks of the Venendchay river. Its population mainly is busy with gardening, vegetable-growing, silkworm breeding and animal husbandry. There are secondary school, club and a medical center in the village. It has a population of 291.

== Etymology ==
The village took its name from the Ağrıdağ (Aghrydagh) Mount located in the east of the Turkey. In the Turkic languages the word of ağrı / ağru means "high, height".
