= Agrișu =

Agrișu may refer to several places in Romania:

- Agrișu de Jos and Agrișu de Sus, villages in Șieu-Odorhei Commune, Bistrița-Năsăud County
- Agrișu Mare, a village in Târnova Commune, Arad County
- Agrișu Mic, a village in Hășmaș Commune, Arad County

== See also ==
- Agriș
