= Amfreville-sous-les-Monts =

- Commune
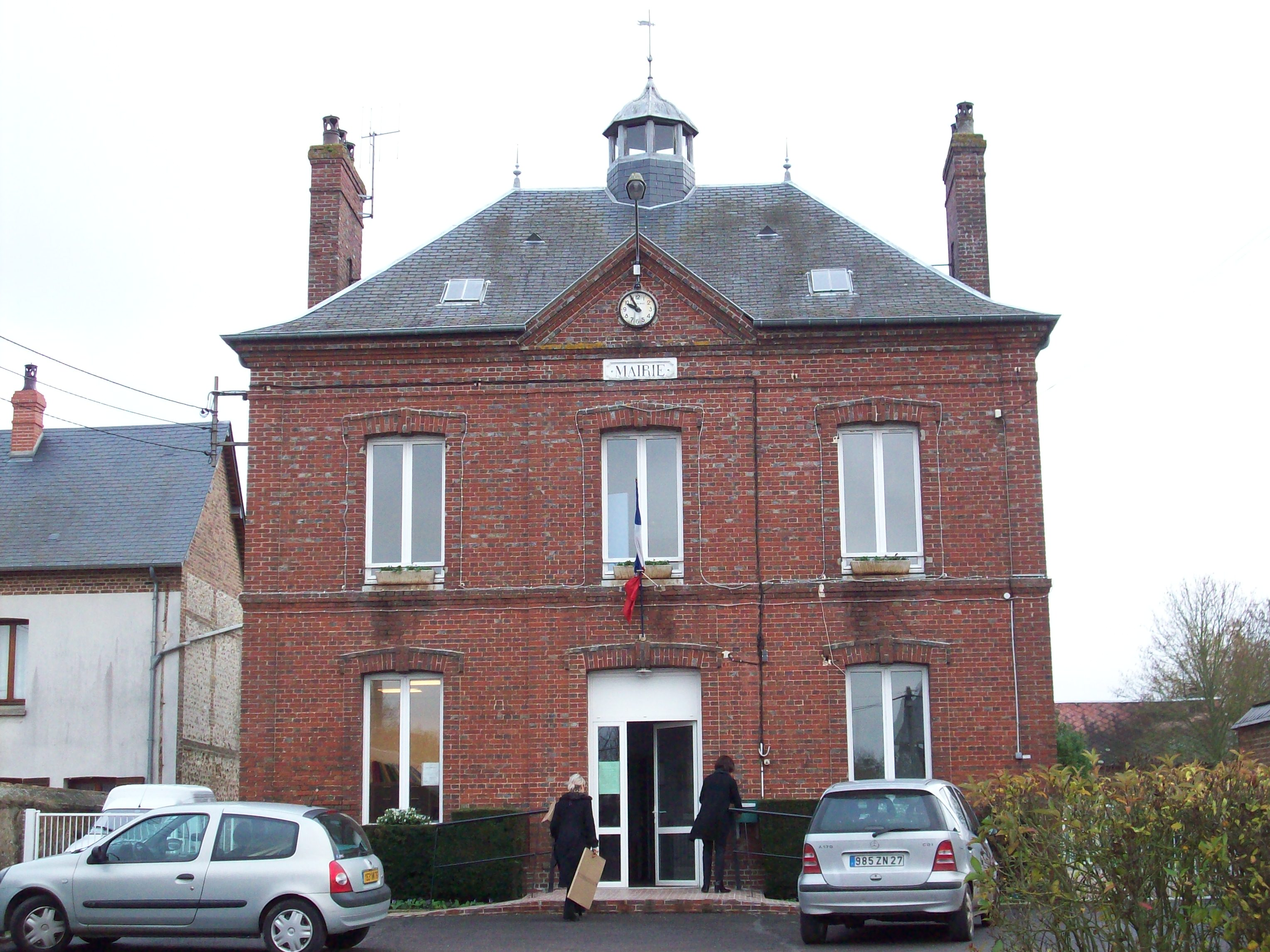
- The town hall in Amfreville-sous-les-Monts
- Location of Amfreville-sous-les-Monts
- Location within France Location within Normandy
- Coordinates: 49°18′22″N 1°15′37″E
- Country: France
- Region: Normandy
- Department: Eure
- Arrondissement: Les Andelys
- Canton: Val-de-Reuil
- Intercommunality: Seine-Eure

Government
  - Mayor (2020–2026): François Vigor
- Area^{1}: 7.52 km^{2} (2.90 sq mi)
- Elevation: 120 m (390 ft)
- Highest elevation: 157 m (515 ft)
- Lowest elevation: 7 m (23 ft)
- Population (2023): 532
  - Density: 70.7/km^{2} (183/sq mi)
- Time zone: UTC+01:00 (CET)
  - Summer (DST): UTC+02:00 (CEST)
- INSEE/Postal code: 27013 /27590
- ^{1} French Land Register data, which excludes lakes, ponds, glaciers > 1 km^{2} (0.386 sq mi or 247 acres) and river estuaries.

Amfreville-sous-les-Monts (French pronunciation: [ɑ̃fʁəvil su le mɔ̃]) is a commune in the Eure department in Normandy in north-western France. It is around 20 km southeast of Rouen.

== Population ==
Historical population
Year	Pop.	±% p.a.
1968	388	—
1975	374	−0.52%
1982	431	+2.05%
1990	445	+0.40%
1999	471	+0.63%
2007	534	+1.58%
2012	506	−1.07%
2017	494	−0.48%
2023	532	+1.24%
Source: INSEE

== See also ==
- Communes of the Eure department
