= Louis Coudouret =

Louis Fernand Coudouret
- Born: 31 May 1896; Marseille, France
- Died: 7 July 1929 (aged 33)
- Military career
- Allegiance: France
- Branch: French Army
- Service years: 1914–1928
- Rank: Lieutenant
- Unit: VB102, N112, N57, N102, N581, Spa103
- Conflicts: World War I
- Awards: Legion d'Honneur and Croix de Guerre; British Distinguished Conduct Medal; Russian Cross of St. George, Order of St. George, and Order of St. Vladimir

Lieutenant Louis Fernand Coudouret (31 May 1896 – 7 July 1929) was a World War I flying ace credited with six aerial victories over a two-year period from 4 May 1916 to 2 June 1918.

== Birth ==
Louis Fernand Coudouret was born on 31 May 1896 in Marseille, France.

== Career ==
On 15 December 1914, Coudouret volunteered for military service during World War I and was assigned to aviation duty in the French Army. On 14 April 1915, he reported for pilot training., He received Military Pilot's Brevet No. 1020 on 1 June 1915. Sent to active flying duty on 28 April 1916, he shuttled among five Western Front squadrons, scoring an aerial victory apiece in two of them while rising through the enlisted ranks.

On 1 February 1917, he was transferred to the Military Mission in the Russian Empire. Ten days later, he was commissioned as a temporary sous lieutenant (sublieutenant). While serving on the Eastern Front, he scored three more aerial victories in late 1917, bringing his total to five. On 1 April 1918, he transferred back to the Western Front. Assigned to Escadrille 103 on 18 May 1918, he scored his sixth and final victory on 2 June 1918.

== Atlantic flight, accident and death ==
Coudouret left the French Army in 1928 and made plans to cross the Atlantic Ocean from Paris to New York City with his Russian friends Count Louis de Mailly-Nesle and Captain Louis Mailloux and make what would have been the first French nonstop transatlantic flight. They used a Bernard 191GR aircraft designed by Jean Hubert. However, their first attempt — on 25 August 1928 — ended in failure when the fuel-laden plane, named La France, failed to gain altitude on takeoff from Le Bourget. It narrowly missed trees, telegraph lines, and electric power lines and scraped its landing gear along the roof of a house before the men dumped their reserve fuel, allowing the plane to climb. After circling the airfield for seven minutes, the shaken aviators landed safely.

The Government of France prohibited transatlantic flights by its citizens, deeming them a useless hazard. Coudouret nonetheless planned a second transatlantic attempt in 1929, hoping to fly from Paris to Seville, Spain, and then across the Atlantic to New York in La France. He arrived at Seville on 3 June 1929, but Spanish authorities — in deference to the French government — denied him permission to make a transatlantic flight from Spain and locked his plane in a hangar. He eventually decided to return to France and took off on 7 July 1929 bound for Angoulême. However, at an altitude of 500 metres (1,640 feet), he lost control of the plane due to engine failure and crashed at Saint-Amant-de-Bonnieure. Coudouret died of his injuries hours after the crash, but his two passengers survived.
