= Bandiat =

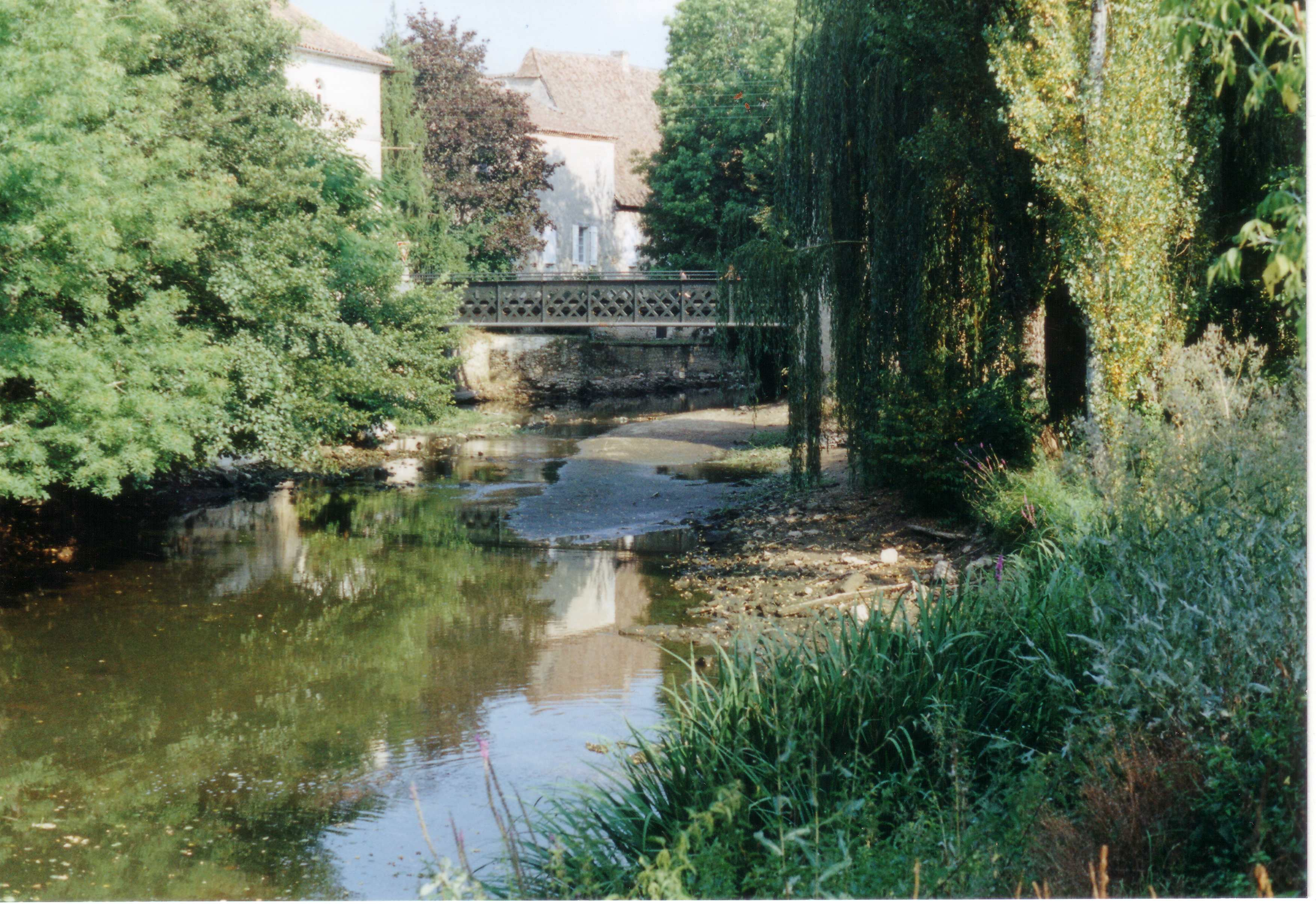

- Location within France Location within Nouvelle-Aquitaine

Location
- Country: France

Physical characteristics
- Source
  - location: Haute-Vienne
  - elevation: 440 m (1,440 ft)
- Mouth
  - location: Tardoire
  - coordinates: 45°46′41″N 0°20′21″E
- Length: 91.4 km (56.8 mi)
- Discharge
  - average: 0.6–6.0 m^{3}/s (21–212 cu ft/s)

Basin features
- Progression: Tardoire→ Bonnieure→ Charente→ Atlantic Ocean

The Bandiat (French pronunciation: [bɑ̃dja]) is a small river in western France, a left tributary of the Tardoire. It flows through the Haute-Vienne, Dordogne and Charente departments. It is 91.4 km (56.8 mi) long.

== Geography ==
The Bandiat begins its course just south of the Puy Chauvet (488 m), at roughly 440 m above sea level, near the settlement of Grand Puyconnieux (commune of Dournazac) in the Haute-Vienne department. The river flows first to the southwest and then turns northwest in the Dordogne and, at high water level, empties into the Tardoire (Charente basin) near Agris in the Charente. Otherwise, the river disappears near Les Vieilles Vaures (commune of Agris) about 5 km before reaching the Tardoire. All the water drains away in several sinkholes in the karst only to reappear near Angoulême as springs of the river Touvre, a tributary of the Charente.

== Hydrology ==
The discharge of the Bandiat was measured near Feuillade as 0.6 m³/s in the summer and 6 m³/s in the winter.

== Communes by the river ==
- Abjat-sur-Bandiat
- Nontron
- Javerlhac
- Feuillade
- Marthon
- Saint-Germain-de-Montbron
- Chazelles
- Pranzac
- Rivières
- Agris

== Gallery ==
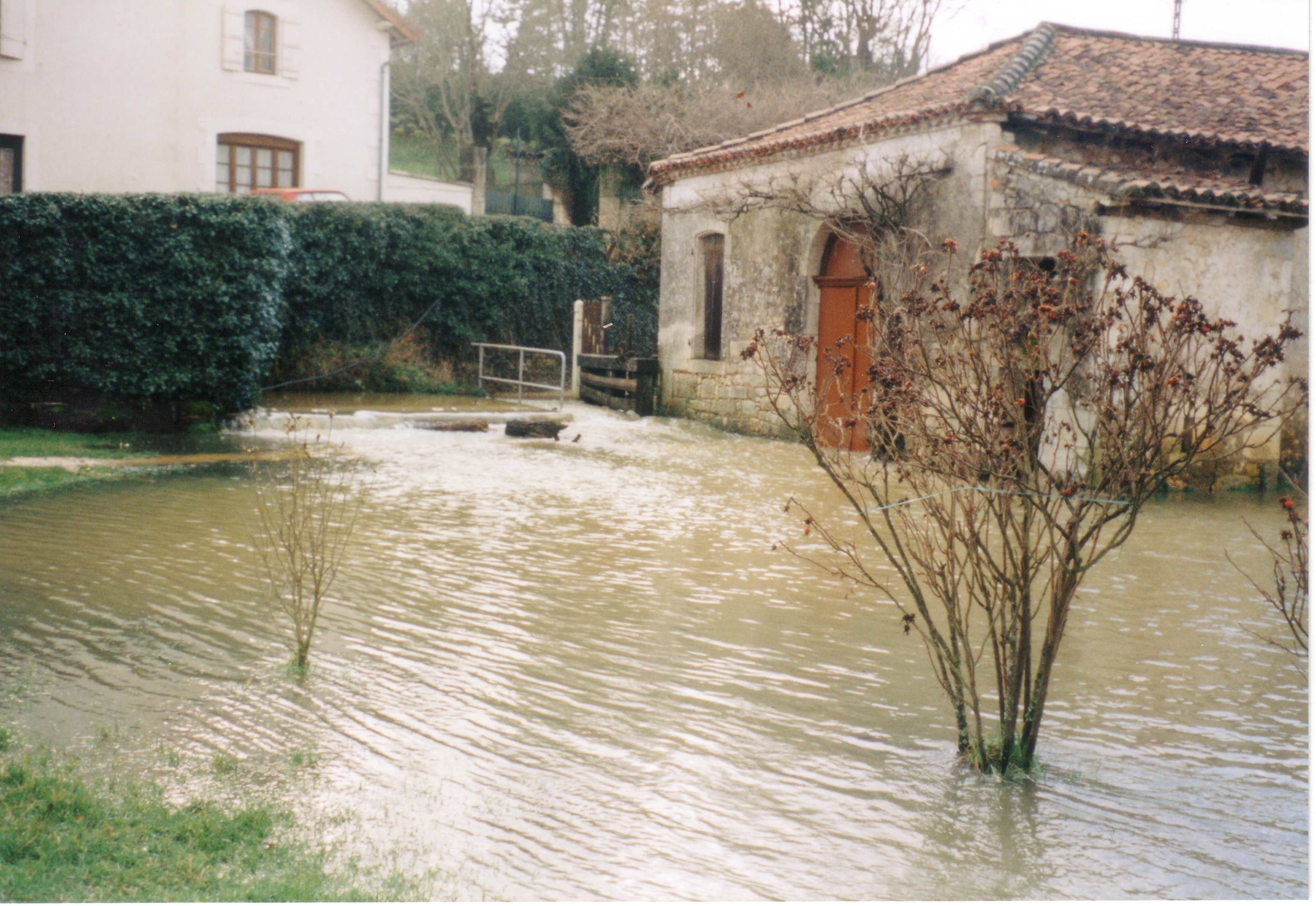
Flood in winter at the mill of Javerlhac

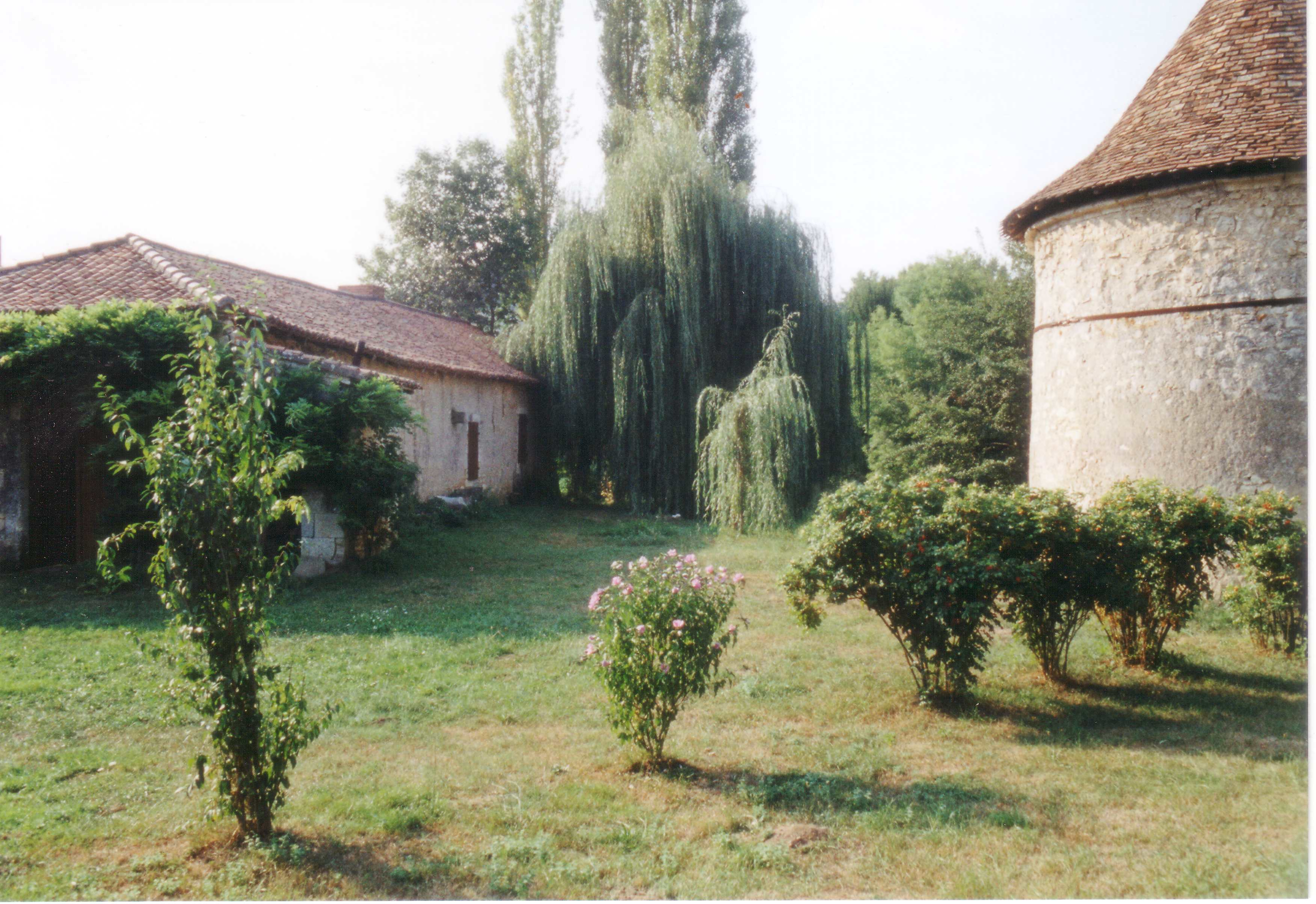
The same place in summer

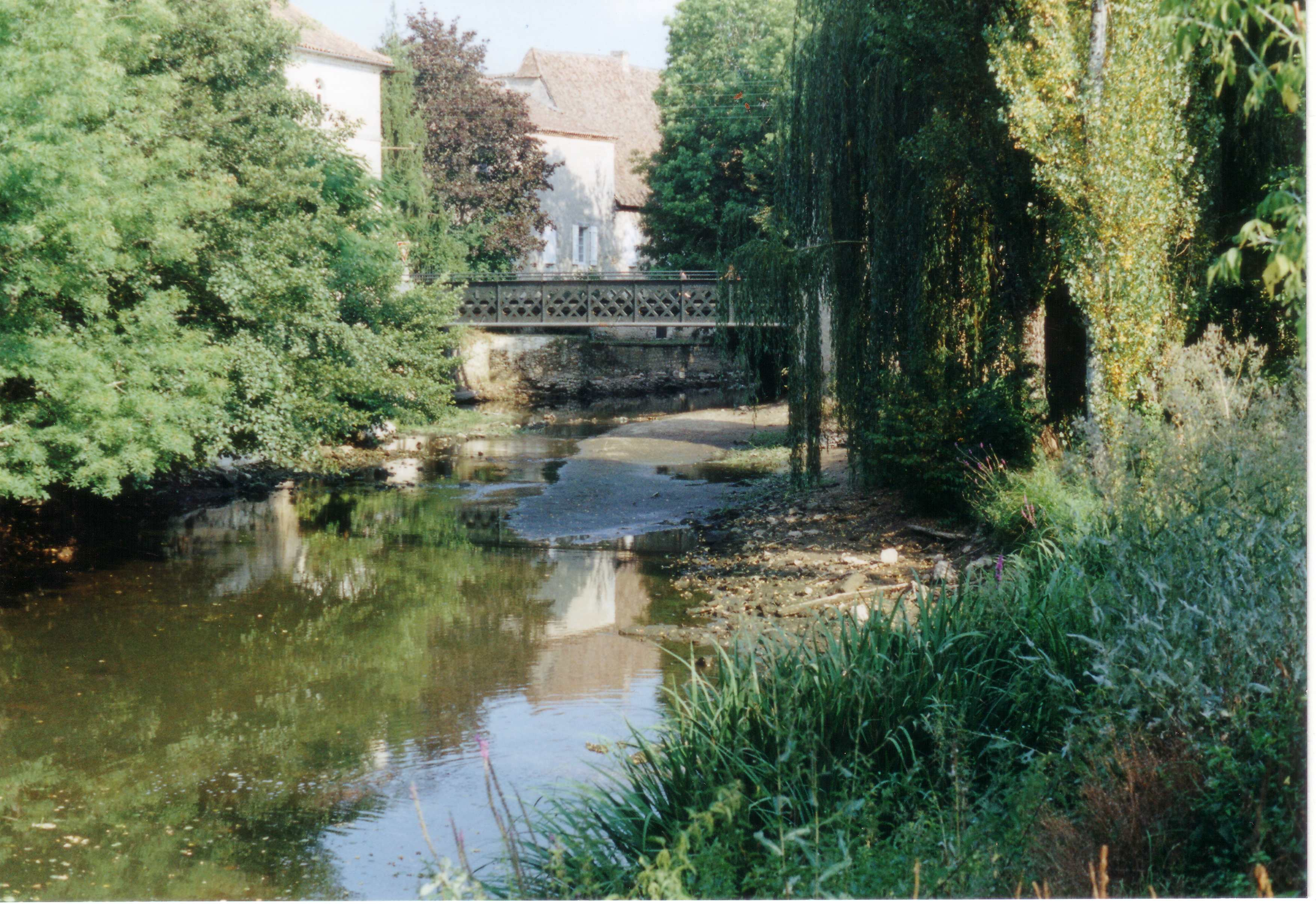
Drought in August, the mill is on the right

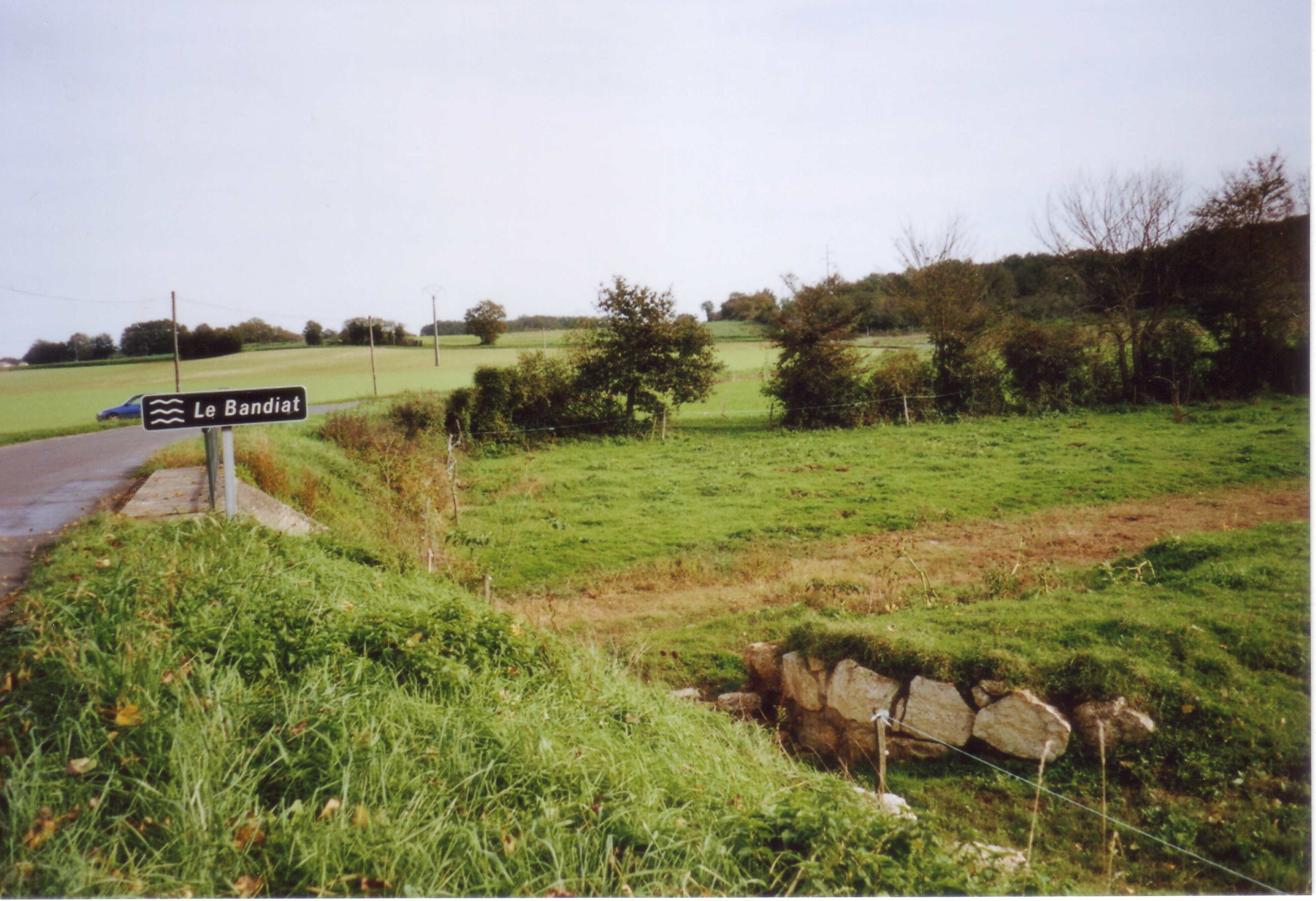
The area around Les Vieilles Vaures (commune of Agris) about 5 km from Agris. All water has disappeared in the karst of La Rochefoucauld
