= Tardoire =

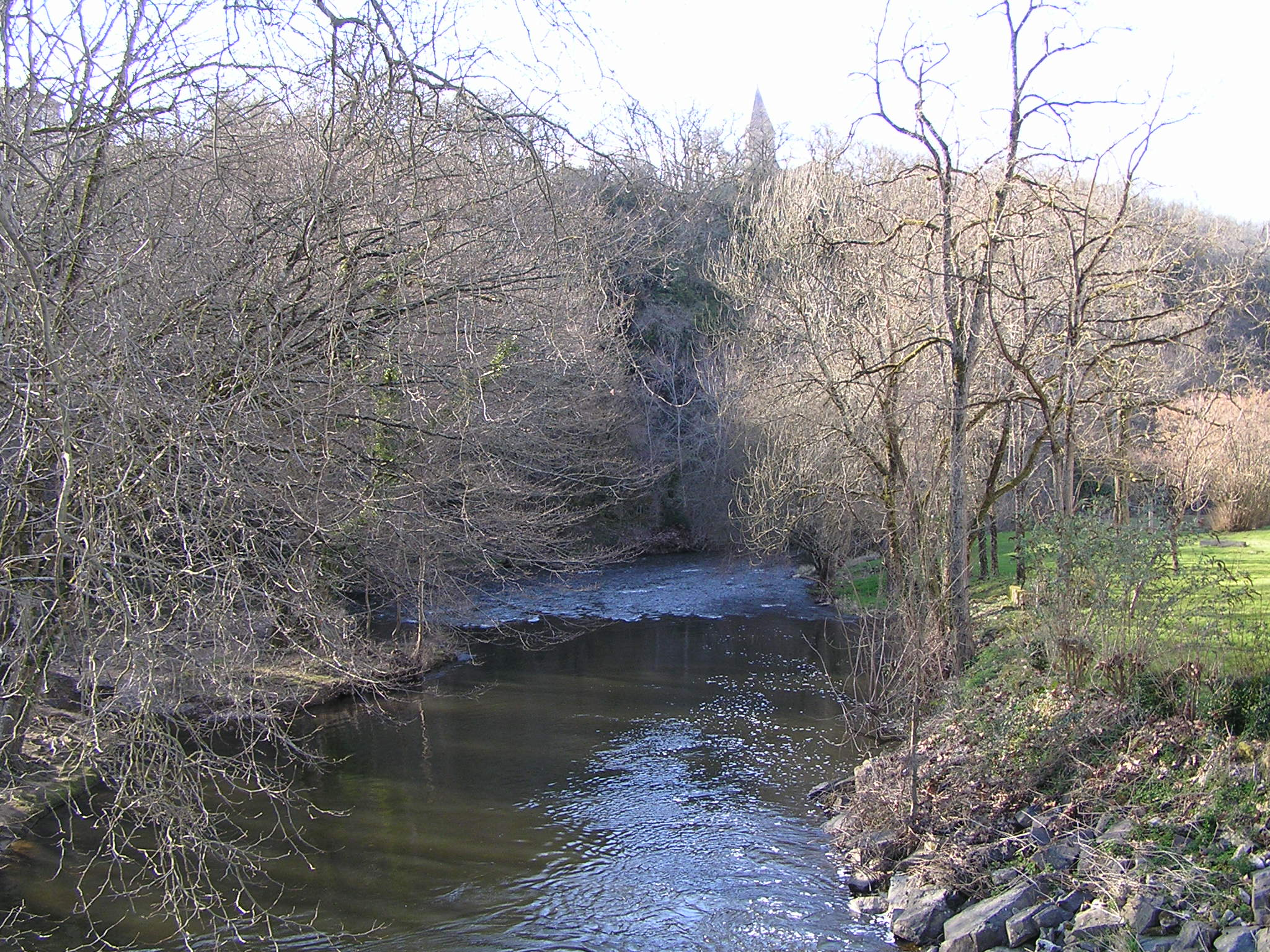
- The Tardoire at Rancogne

- Location within France Location within Nouvelle-Aquitaine

Location
- Country: France

Physical characteristics
- Source
  - location: Haute-Vienne
- Mouth
  - location: Bonnieure
  - coordinates: 45°51′45″N 0°14′31″E
- Length: 114 km (71 mi)

Basin features
- Progression: Bonnieure→ Charente→ Atlantic Ocean
- Tributaries
  - left: Bandiat

The Tardoire (French pronunciation: [taʁdwaʁ]) is a river in southwestern France, left tributary to the river Bonnieure. It is 114 km (71 mi) long. Its source is in Châlus, in the Haute-Vienne département. It flows into the Bonnieure near Saint-Ciers-sur-Bonnieure. Over much of its length, the Tardoire flows underground. Its largest tributary is the Bandiat.

It flows through the following départements and towns:

- Haute-Vienne: Châlus, Cussac
- Charente: Montbron, La Rochefoucauld, Rivières (a small municipality next to La Rochefoucauld)
