= Val-de-Bonnieure =

- Commune
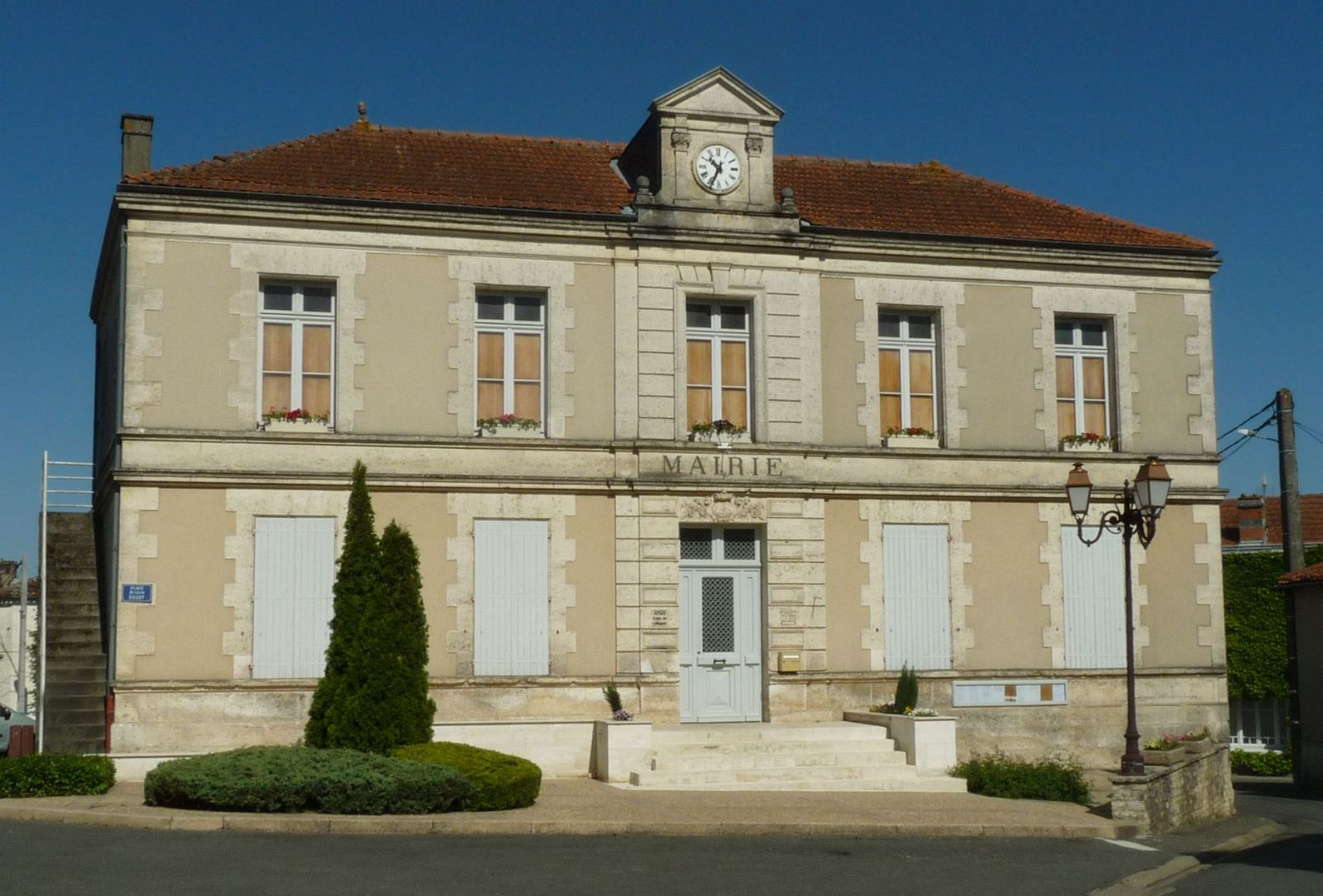
- The town hall in Val-de-Bonnieure
- Location of Val-de-Bonnieure
- Location within France Location within Nouvelle-Aquitaine
- Coordinates: 45°50′57″N 0°17′15″E
- Country: France
- Region: Nouvelle-Aquitaine
- Department: Charente
- Arrondissement: Confolens
- Canton: Boixe-et-Manslois
- Intercommunality: Cœur de Charente

Government
  - Mayor (2020–2026): Aurélie Lacroix
- Area^{1}: 28.11 km^{2} (10.85 sq mi)
- Population (2023): 1,332
  - Density: 47.39/km^{2} (122.7/sq mi)
- Time zone: UTC+01:00 (CET)
  - Summer (DST): UTC+02:00 (CEST)
- INSEE/Postal code: 16300 /16230
- ^{1} French Land Register data, which excludes lakes, ponds, glaciers > 1 km^{2} (0.386 sq mi or 247 acres) and river estuaries.

Val-de-Bonnieure (French pronunciation: [val də bɔnjœʁ], literally Vale of Bonnieure) is a commune in the department of Charente, southwestern France. The municipality was established on 1 January 2018 by merger of the former communes of Saint-Angeau (the seat), Saint-Amant-de-Bonnieure and Sainte-Colombe.

== See also ==
- Communes of the Charente department
