= Bernard 190 =

1928 French airliner

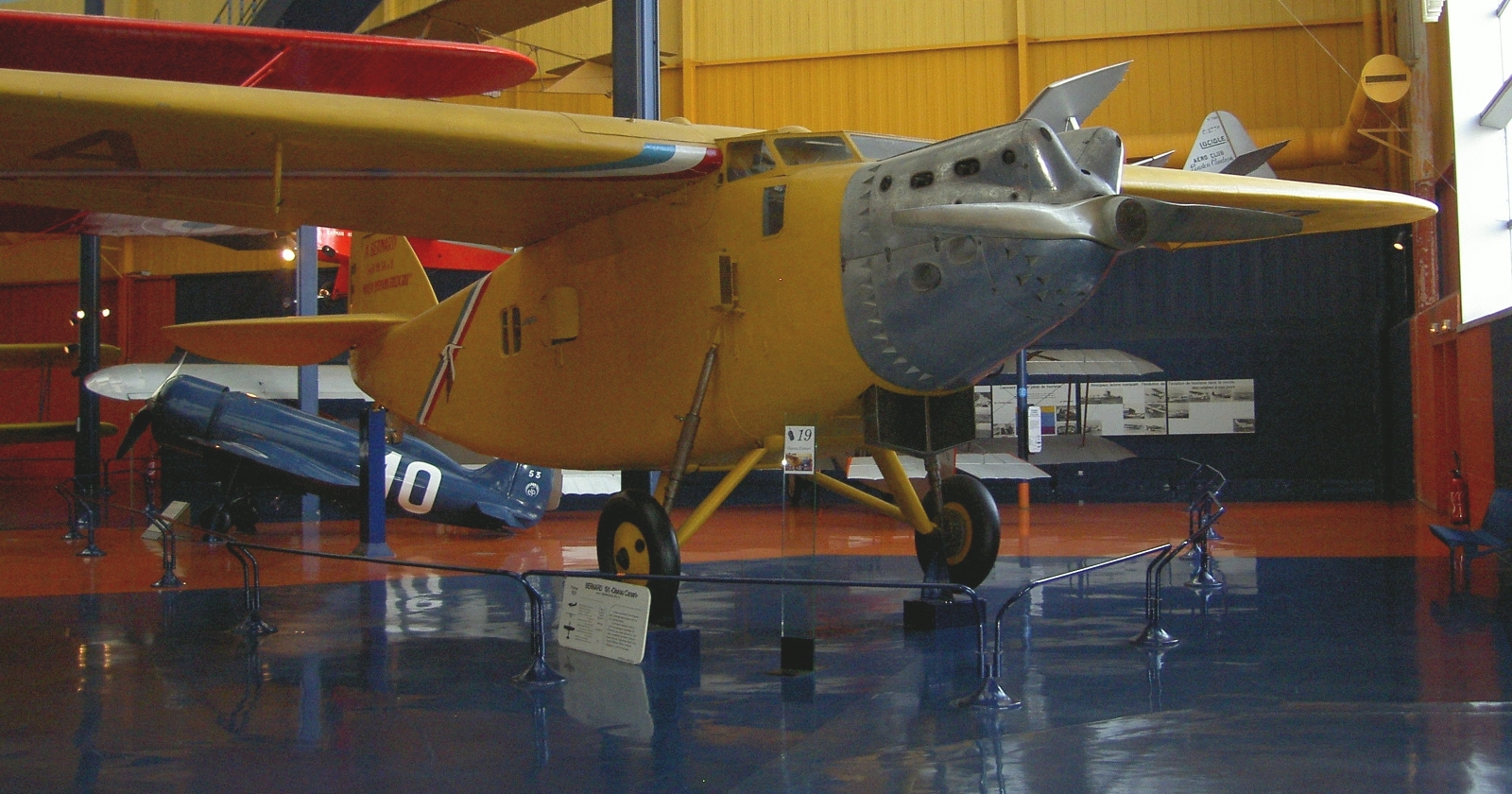
- Bernard 191GR Oiseau Canari preserved at the Musée de l'Air et de l'Espace

General information
- Type: Airliner
- Manufacturer: Bernard
- Designer: Jean Hubert
- Primary user: CIDNA
- Number built: ca. 15

History
- First flight: 1928

The Bernard 190 or Bernard-Hubert 190 was a French airliner of 1928.

== Design and characteristics ==
The Bernard 190 was a high-wing cantilever monoplane of conventional configuration, based on the Bernard 18. Compared with its predecessor, it kept the same basic design but featured redesigned tail surfaces and an enlarged cabin, and it offered its flight crew a completely enclosed cockpit. Also like its predecessor, the basic airliner model provided — the 190T — provided the basis for a long-range aircraft to be used in record attempts, the 191GR (for Grand Raid).

== Operational history ==
The eight 190Ts entered service in 1929 with CIDNA, operating on various European routes. The 190T was not popular with CIDNA, whose president had been trying for several years to purchase more efficient and economical Fokker F.VIIs. The last 190T was burnt on 3 January 1933.

The 190 is best remembered for the exploits of the three 191GRs. The first built was used by Louis Coudouret in an attempt to fly from Paris to New York City and make what would have been the first French nonstop transatlantic flight in August 1928. On 25 August, Coudouret and two other men took off from Le Bourget in the fuel-laden 191GR La France but failed to gain altitude. The plane narrowly missed trees, telegraph lines, and electric power lines and scraped its landing gear along the roof of a house before the men dumped their reserve fuel, allowing the plane to climb. After circling the airfield for seven minutes, the shaken aviators landed safely. The Government of France prohibited its citizens from making transatlantic flights, deeming them a useless hazard, but Coudouret nonetheless planned a second attempt in 1929, hoping to fly from Paris to Seville, Spain, and then across the Atlantic to New York in La France. He arrived in Seville on 3 June 1929, but Spanish authorities — in deference to the French government — denied him permission to make a transatlantic flight from Spain and locked his plane in a hangar. He eventually decided to return to France and took off on 7 July 1929 bound for Angoulême. However, at an altitude of 500 metres (1,640 feet) he lost control of the plane due to engine failure and crashed at Saint-Amant-de-Bonnieure, France. Coudouret died of his injuries hours after the crash, but his two passengers survived.

The second example was used in the first successful French aerial crossing of the North Atlantic. Painted bright yellow and dubbed Oiseau Canari ("Canary Bird") it departed Old Orchard Beach, Maine, in the United States on 13 June 1929 piloted by Jean Assolant, René Lefèvre and Armand Lotti. It completed the crossing to Oyambre Beach, near Comillas, Cantabria, Spain, in 29 hours 52 minutes, even with a stowaway (Arthur Schreiber) aboard. This aircraft is now preserved in the Musée de l'Air et de l'Espace.

The third 191GR was used by Antoine Paillard to set two world airspeed records, for 100 km (62 mi) with a 2,000 kg (4,400 lb) payload, and for 1,000 km (620 mi) with a 1,000 kg (2,200 lb) payload.

== Variants ==
190T
Single-engined airliner, powered by a 358 kW (480 hp) Gnome et Rhône 9Ady (licence-built Bristol Jupiter) radial piston engine.

191T
A single aircraft powered by a 447 kW (600 hp) Hispano-Suiza 12Lb V-12 engine.

191GR
Record-breaking aircraft, powered by 447 kW (599 hp) Hispano-Suiza 12Lb piston engine. Three built as 191G.R. No.1, 191G.R. No.2 and 191G.R. No.3.

192T
Single mailplane example for Aéropostale, powered by a 358 kW (480 hp) Gnome & Rhône 9Akx radial engine.

193T
Single-engined transport aircraft, powered by a 336 kW (451 hp) Lorraine 12Eb piston engine. Only one built.

197GR
Engine demonstrator commissioned by Lorraine-Dietrich. Lost off Rangoon 26 February 1929.

== Operators ==
France

- Aéropostale
- CIDNA

== Specifications (190T) ==
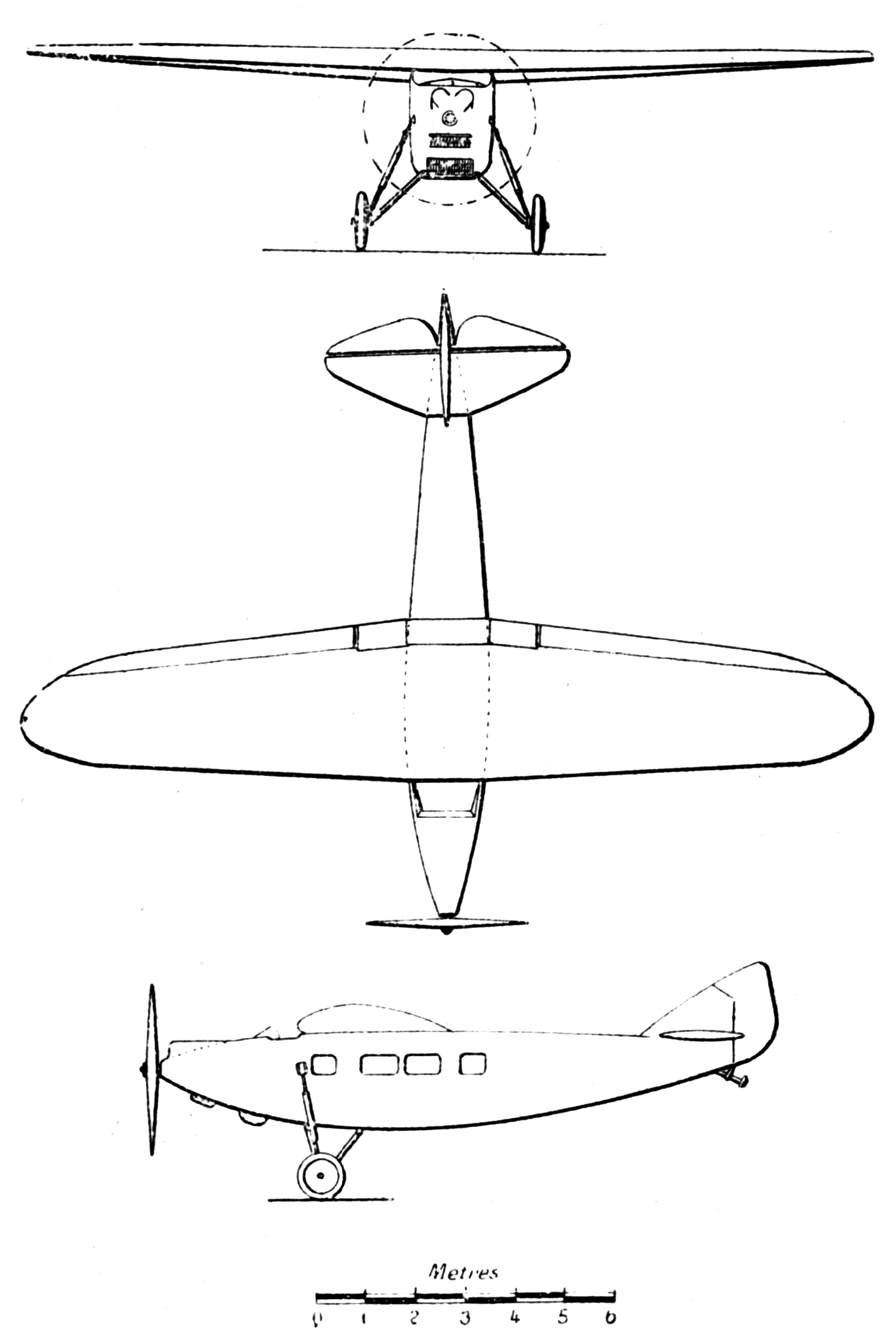
Bernard 190 3-view drawing from L'Aéronautique June,1928

Data from Jane's all the World's Aircraft 1928. Aviafrance:Bernard 190T

General characteristics

- Crew: 2
- Capacity: 8 pax
- Length: 12.58 m (41 ft 3 in)
- Wingspan: 17.3 m (56 ft 9 in)
- Height: 3.5 m (11 ft 6 in)
- Wing area: 42.909 m^{2} (461.87 sq ft)
- Empty weight: 1,780 kg (3,924 lb)
- Gross weight: 3,300 kg (7,275 lb)
- Fuel capacity: 440 kg (970 lb)
- Powerplant: 1 × Gnome & Rhône 9Ady 9-cylinder air-cooled radial piston engine, 360 kW (480 hp)
- Propellers: 2-bladed fixed pitch propeller

Performance

- Maximum speed: 220 km/h (140 mph, 120 kn)200
- Stall speed: 90 km/h (56 mph, 49 kn)
- Range: 1,000 km (620 mi, 540 nmi)
- Service ceiling: 3,700 m (12,100 ft)
- Time to altitude: 1,000 m (3,300 ft) in 7 minutes; 3,000 m (9,800 ft) in 29 minutes 30 seconds
- Wing loading: 79.25 kg/m^{2} (16.23 lb/sq ft)

== Bibliography ==
- Liron, Jean (1990). Les avions Bernard. Collection Docavia (in French). Vol. 31. Paris: Éditions Larivière. ISBN 2-84890-065-2.
- Meurillion, Louis (October 1969). ""Tango" et "Canari": les "Oiseaux" de raid de Bernard" [The "Tango" and "Canary": Bernard's Raiding "Birds"]. Le Album de Fanatique de l'Aviation (in French). No. 4. pp. 20–24. ISSN 0757-4169.
- Meurillion, Louis (November 1969). ""Tango" et "Canari": les "Oiseaux" de raid de Bernard" [The "Tango" and "Canary": Bernard's Raiding "Birds"]. Le Album de Fanatique de l'Aviation (in French). No. 5. pp. 18–19. ISSN 0757-4169.
- Meurillion, Louis (December 1969). ""L'Oiseau Canari" et l'Atlantique" [The "Canary Bird" and the Atlantic]. Le Album de Fanatique de l'Aviation (in French). No. 6. pp. 22–26. ISSN 0757-4169.
- Meurillion, Louis (January 1970). "Les derniers dérives de "l'Oiseau Tango"" [The Last Derivatives of the "Tango Bird"]. Le Album de Fanatique de l'Aviation (in French). No. 7. pp. 24–25. ISSN 0757-4169.
- Roffe, Michael; Baker, David (December 1996). "Great moments in aviation — No 19". Aeroplane Monthly. Vol. 24, no. 12. pp. 24–25. ISSN 0143-7240.
- Stroud, John (1966). European Transport Aircraft since 1910. London: Putnam.
