= Bernard SIMB V.2 =

Single-seat, single-engine French monoplane

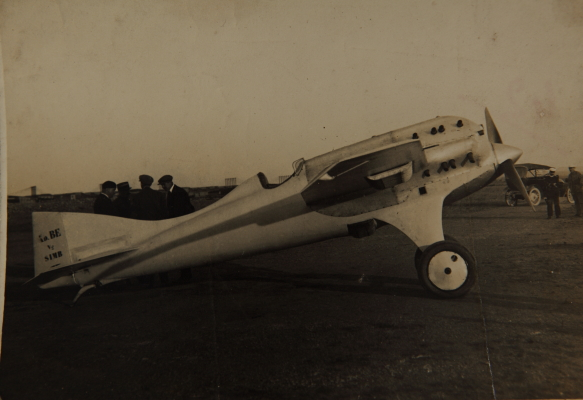

General information
- Type: High speed single seat monoplane
- National origin: France
- Manufacturer: Société Industrielle des Métaux et du Bois (SIMB)
- Designer: Jean Hubert
- Number built: 1

History
- First flight: 2 October 1924

The Bernard SIMB V.2 was a single-seat, single-engine French monoplane, built in the mid-1920s. It was originally designed for racing but was adapted for a successful attempt on the world's absolute speed record.

== Design and development ==
Design of the Bernard V.2 was begun at the same time as that of the Bernard V.1, with the intention of entering both models into the Beaumont Cup competition held in June 1924, but the V.2 was completed too late for entry and the V.1 was destroyed before the competition. Bernard then decided to use the V.2 in an attempt on the world airspeed record held for the U.S. by A. J. Williams in a Curtiss R-6 at 429 km/h (267 mph). The nickname Ferbois was often used instead of SIMB, so the V.2 sometimes appears as the Bernard-Ferbois V.2.

The V.2 was a cantilever mid-wing monoplane. Its all-wood wings were built with multicellular construction around two parallel spars and the surfaces were sanded and lacquered to reduce friction drag. In plan, the wings were straight tapered, mostly on the trailing edge, with oblique tips. The ailerons were near triangular, reaching to the wing tips; there were no flaps. Aluminium fairings blended the wing roots into the fuselage; similar fairings were used at the elevator roots. The elevators had straight, swept leading edges and were set at the top of the fuselage. They carried separate elevators with a cut-out for rudder movement. The latter was wide and almost rectangular, its upper edge blending into an almost triangular, wide chord fin.

The wooden monocoque fuselage was equally refined and polished, its oval section tapering towards the tail. Towards the nose the fuselage flattened to accommodate the three four-cylinder blocks of its 340 kW (460 hp) W-12 Hispano-Suiza 12Gb engine, driving a low-set two-blade propeller with a large spinner. This was water-cooled, with under-wing radiators from the root to half span, assisted by a single ventral radiator just aft of the undercarriage. The fixed, tricycle undercarriage had unfaired single mainwheels on a single axle, attached by bungee cord to two flat, faired, tapered legs. These legs were cross-braced with streamlined stays. The open cockpit was at the wing trailing edge. Because the Hispano engine of the V.2 was mounted lower in the nose than the Lorraine-Dietrich, another W-12, of the V.1, the central cylinder bank did not so completely obscure the pilot's forward view.

Some modifications, detailed below, were made to the V.2 before its successful attempt on the world speed record. The Bernard (or SIMB) V.3 was a proposed, unbuilt development with a retractable undercarriage and a Lorraine-Dietricht engine.

== Operational history ==
The V.2 made its first flight from Istres on 2 October 1924, piloted by Florentin Bonnet. Five more test flights followed until, despite a few small problems, the aircraft was judged ready for an attempt on the airspeed record. The V.2 returned an average speed of 393 km/h (244 mph) after four passes of a 3 km (1.9 mi) track. This was a new French national record but not the sought after world record.

During November, several test flights and alterations were made. The most significant changes were to the wings where two successive span reductions produced a final value of 9.10 m (29 ft 10 in) and an area of 10.8 m^{2} (116 ft^{2}). The ailerons were also modified. The dorsal radiator was removed and the engine moved forward under an improved cowling; the wooden propeller was replaced by a metal one made by Levasseur. The cockpit was raised and moved forward a little to improve the pilot's view. A second attempt on the speed record was made on 11 December 1924, when an average speed of 448 km/h (278 mph) was achieved. After a short delay whilst the FAI rules were debated, this was homologated as the absolute world speed record and stood for almost three years.

Later that December a full-size replica of the V.2 appeared at the Paris Aero Show claiming, in anticipation of homologation, that it was the record holder. The model differed from the real V.2 in several details. The genuine aircraft did appear once on public display, at the Petit Palace in Paris in November 1933, after which it was scrapped.

== Specifications (V.2, French speed record holder before final modifications) ==
Data from Liron

General characteristics

- Crew: 1
- Length: 6.71 m (22 ft 0 in)
- Wingspan: 9.90 m (32 ft 6 in)
- Height: 2.32 m (7 ft 7 in)
- Wing area: 11.60 m^{2} (124.9 sq ft)
- Aspect ratio: 8.2
- Airfoil: Bernard 202
- Empty weight: 1,000 kg (2,205 lb)
- Gross weight: 1,183 kg (2,608 lb)
- Powerplant: 1 × Hispano-Suiza 12Gb W-12 water-cooled piston engine, 340 kW (450 hp)
- Propellers: 2-bladed wooden

Performance

- Maximum speed: 450 km/h (280 mph, 240 kn)

== Bibliography ==
- Liron, Jean (1990). Les avions Bernard. Collection Docavia. Vol. 31. Paris: Éditions Larivière. ISBN 2-84890-065-2.
