= Javerlhac-et-la-Chapelle-Saint-Robert =

- Commune
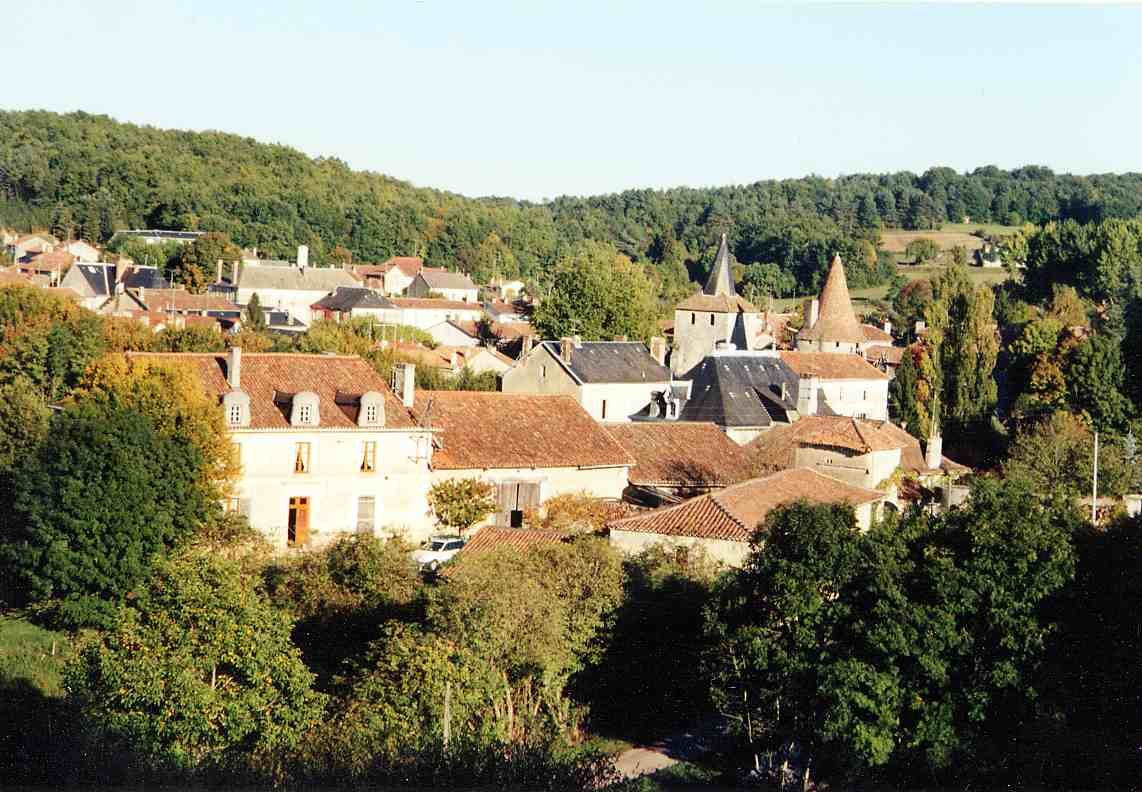
- A general view of Javerlhac

- Coat of arms
- Location of Javerlhac-et-la-Chapelle-Saint-Robert
- Location within France Location within Nouvelle-Aquitaine
- Coordinates: 45°34′14″N 0°33′41″E
- Country: France
- Region: Nouvelle-Aquitaine
- Department: Dordogne
- Arrondissement: Nontron
- Canton: Périgord Vert Nontronnais
- Intercommunality: Périgord nontronnais

Government
  - Mayor (2020–2026): Jean-Pierre Porte
- Area^{1}: 29.25 km^{2} (11.29 sq mi)
- Highest elevation: 221 m (725 ft)
- Lowest elevation: 115 m (377 ft)
- Population (2023): 830
  - Density: 28/km^{2} (73/sq mi)
- Time zone: UTC+01:00 (CET)
  - Summer (DST): UTC+02:00 (CEST)
- INSEE/Postal code: 24214 /24300
- ^{1} French Land Register data, which excludes lakes, ponds, glaciers > 1 km^{2} (0.386 sq mi or 247 acres) and river estuaries.

Javerlhac-et-la-Chapelle-Saint-Robert (French pronunciation: [ʒavɛʁlak e la ʃapɛl sɛ̃ ʁɔbɛʁ]; Occitan: Javerlhac e La Chapela Sent Robert) is a commune in the Dordogne department in Nouvelle-Aquitaine in southwestern France. Javerlhac is in the Parc naturel régional Périgord Limousin.

== Geography ==
The Bandiat river flows near the settlement of Javerlhac.

== Population ==
Historical population
Year	Pop.	±% p.a.
1968	1,129	—
1975	1,071	−0.75%
1982	1,004	−0.92%
1990	1,064	+0.73%
1999	915	−1.66%
2007	899	−0.22%
2012	892	−0.16%
2017	846	−1.05%
2023	830	−0.32%
Source: INSEE

== History ==
The two parishes and communes of Javerlhac and La Chapelle-Saint-Robert were united in 1823.

In the last century, a railway line ran between Nontron (the sub prefecture) and Angoulême in the Charente via Javerlhac. Although the rails have long since been removed and bridges demolished, part of the permanent way beginning approximately 6 kilometers from Javerlhac towards Angoulême (Charenet region) has now been converted to a cycle and horse-riding path and is also used by walkers. This track has been surfaced with asphalt but is blocked to motor vehicles and in some cases bridges have been restored or replaced to keep the path intact.

Some of the station houses along the line still remain and have been converted for various purposes. The old station house in Javerlhac is still standing and in good repair. It is now used as the fire brigade station for the part-time fire service. Firefighters are summoned by a siren which is situated on the town hall and controlled by the mayor's office. In summer months the siren can be heard almost daily as hay barns and hay ricks catch fire. The siren is tested every Sunday at midday.

The road leading to the old station from Place du 8 Mai 1945, is still called Avenue de la Gare.

The former station house, now used as a fire station

== Sights ==
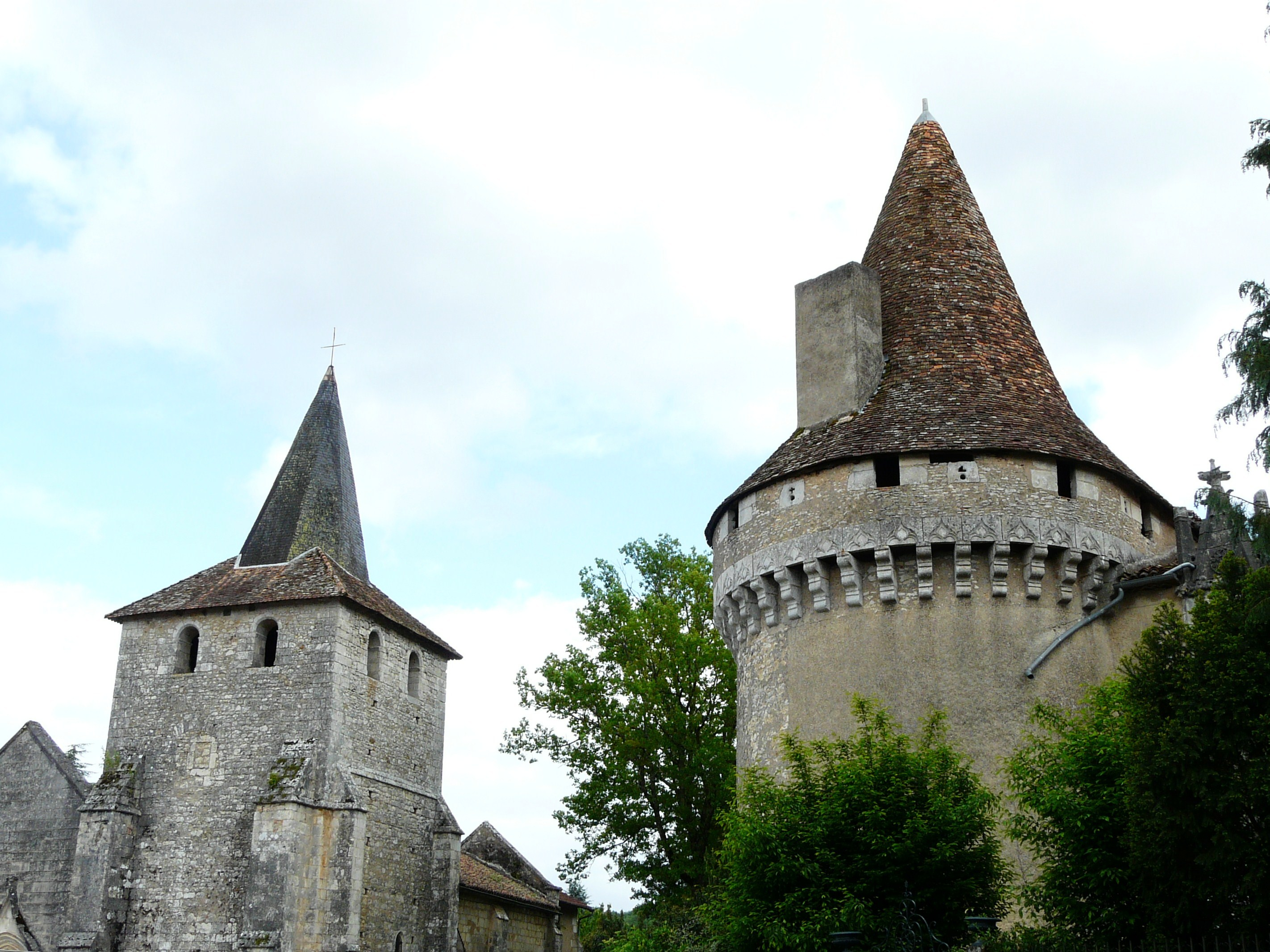
The towers of the castle of Javerlhac and church St Etienne

The château de Javerlhac dates back to the 15th century and has a water mill for the making of nut oil.

La Chapelle-Saint-Robert dates back to the 12th century, it features a Romanesque building which classifies as a historic monument.

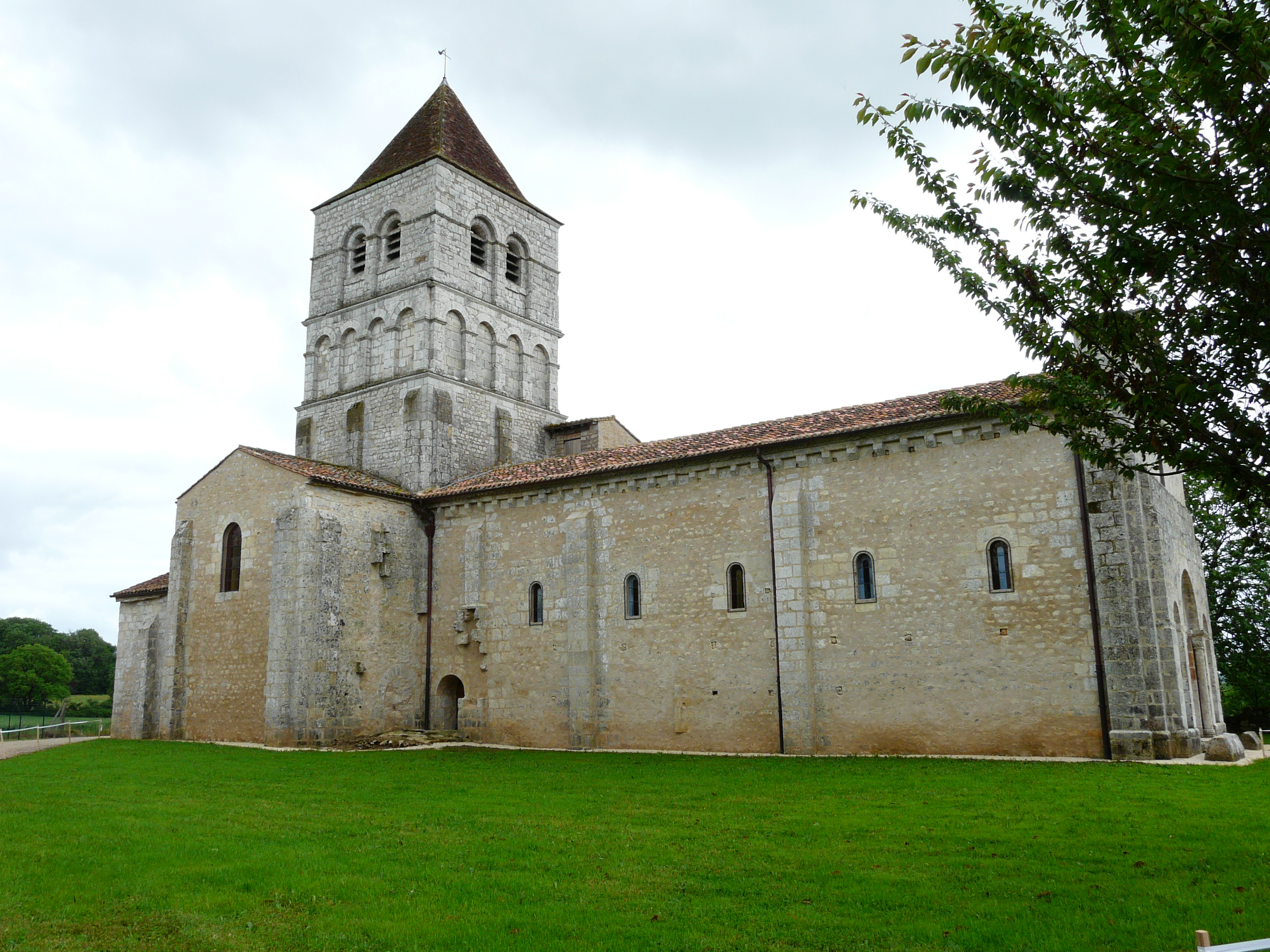
Church of La Chapelle St Robert

Close to the Mayor's office and post office there is a monument dedicated to members of the community who died in both World Wars.

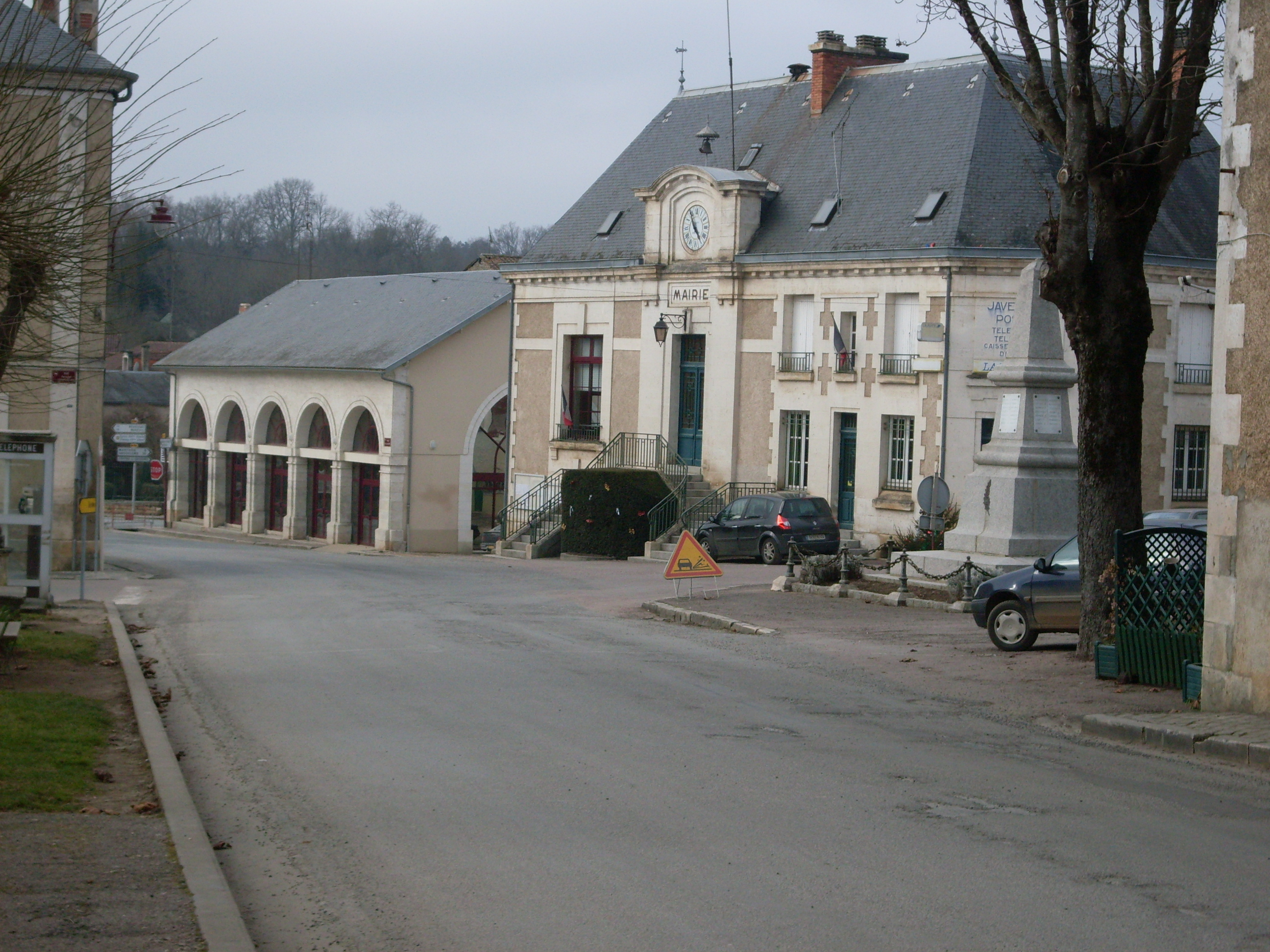
Town hall, mayor's office with the post office and on the right the monument to the victims of the World Wars

About 5 kilometers from Javerlhac on the road to Angoulême, there are 3 small memorials to members of the resistance who were shot by the Nazis in World War II. Just opposite the old church there is a mill on the river Bandiat which is still in working order although only to show tourists how it was in former days. In the grounds of the mill there is a dovecote which is still used by a number of pigeons.

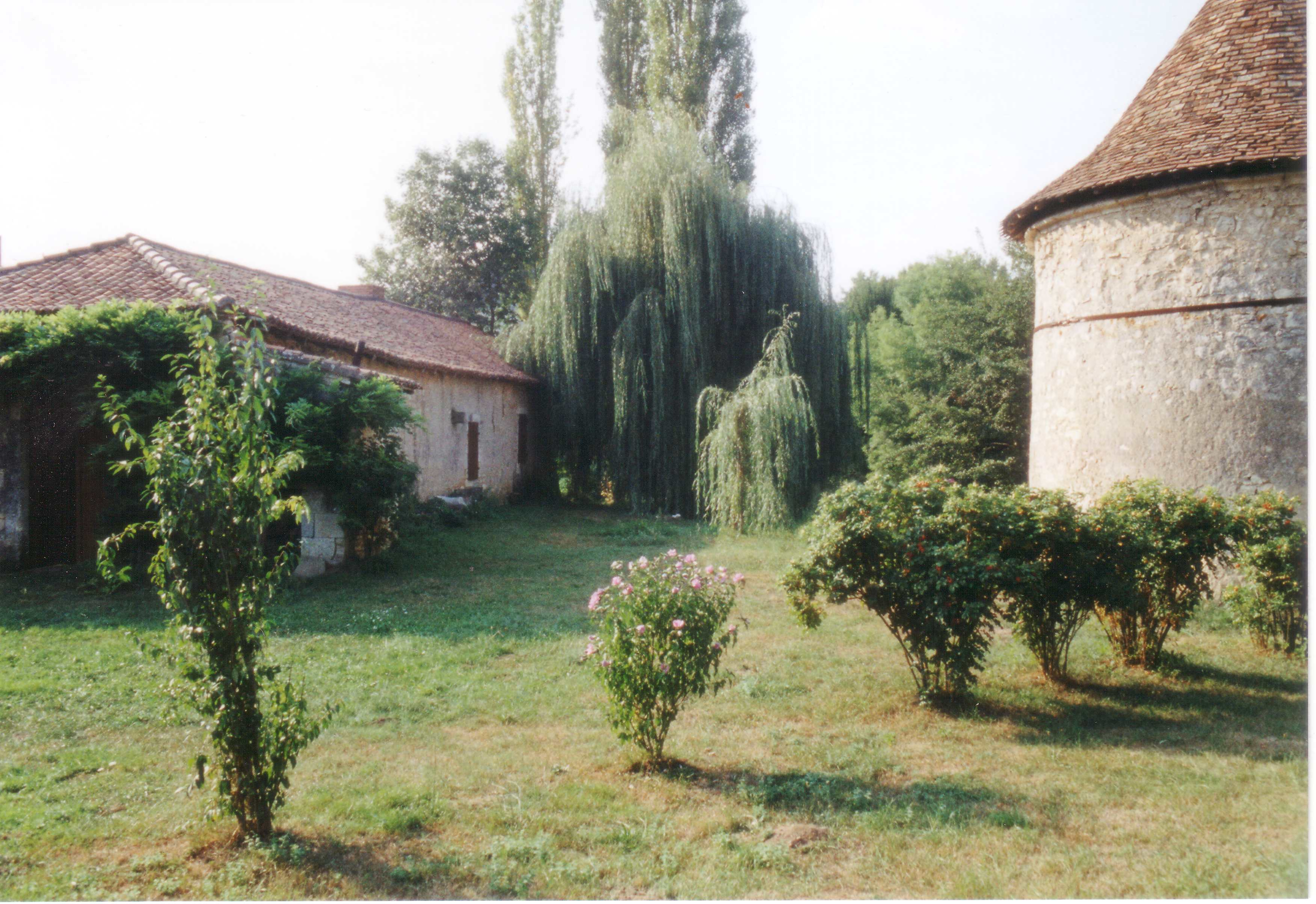
Mill and dovecote

== People ==
The painter Fernand Desmoulin (1853–1914) lived in the village of Javerlhac. Javerlhac, like most of the surrounding towns and villages is host to a small population of expatriate British families, mostly retired couples. There is also a small number of Irish and a few Dutch expatriates in the area. This is noticeable in the advertisements by some estate agents in the area where a lot of their publications and adverts are in English. Also, some banks such as Credit Agricole in nearby Nontron, and a number of notaires have signs in their windows informing customers and clients that "English is spoken here".

== See also ==
- Communes of the Dordogne department
