= Saint-Angeau =

- Part of Val-de-Bonnieure
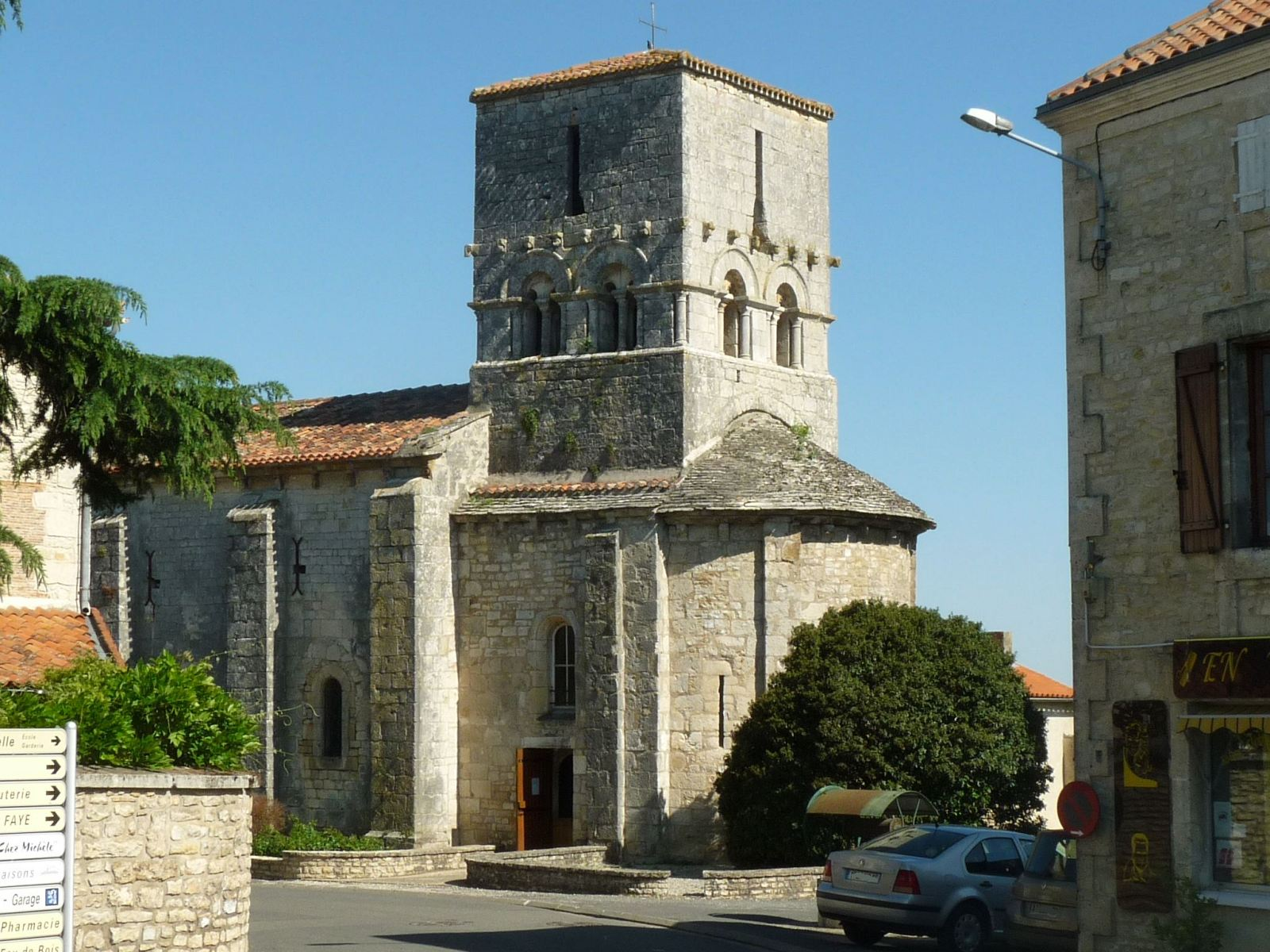

- Coat of arms
- Location of Saint-Angeau
- Location within France Location within Nouvelle-Aquitaine
- Coordinates: 45°50′57″N 0°17′15″E
- Country: France
- Region: Nouvelle-Aquitaine
- Department: Charente
- Arrondissement: Confolens
- Canton: Boixe-et-Manslois
- Commune: Val-de-Bonnieure
- Area^{1}: 10.94 km^{2} (4.22 sq mi)
- Elevation: 104 m (341 ft)
- Highest elevation: 109 m (358 ft)
- Lowest elevation: 62 m (203 ft)
- Population (2017): 740
  - Density: 68/km^{2} (180/sq mi)
- Time zone: UTC+01:00 (CET)
  - Summer (DST): UTC+02:00 (CEST)
- Postal code: 16230
- ^{1} French Land Register data, which excludes lakes, ponds, glaciers > 1 km^{2} (0.386 sq mi or 247 acres) and river estuaries.

Saint-Angeau (French pronunciation: [sɛ̃.t‿ɑ̃ʒo]) is a former commune in the Charente department in southwestern France. On 1 January 2018, it was merged into the new commune of Val-de-Bonnieure.

== Population ==
Historical population

| Year | Pop. | ±% p.a. |
|---|---|---|
| 1793 | 613 | — |
| 1821 | 691 | +0.43% |
| 1846 | 839 | +0.78% |
| 1872 | 830 | −0.04% |
| 1901 | 746 | −0.37% |
| 1926 | 649 | −0.56% |
| 1946 | 586 | −0.51% |

| Year | Pop. | ±% p.a. |
|---|---|---|
| 1962 | 561 | −0.27% |
| 1968 | 613 | +1.49% |
| 1975 | 566 | −1.13% |
| 1982 | 576 | +0.25% |
| 1990 | 579 | +0.06% |
| 1999 | 647 | +1.24% |
| 2017 | 740 | +0.75% |

Source: EHESS and INSEE (2017)

== See also ==
- Communes of the Charente department
