= Bernard 18 =

18
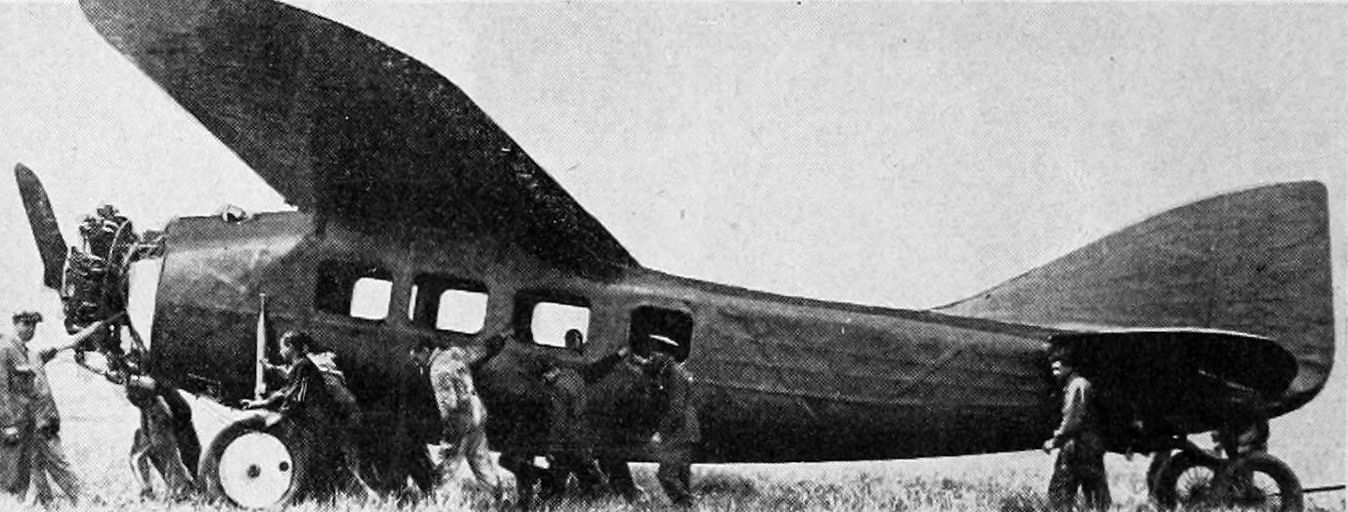
- Bernard 18GR

General information
- Type: Prototype airliner
- Manufacturer: Bernard
- Designer: Jean Hubert and Jean Galtier
- Number built: 2

The Bernard 18 was a prototype airliner developed in France in the 1920s. One of the two prototypes built was used in an abortive transatlantic crossing attempt and a number of failed attempts for aerial records.

== Development ==
The aircraft was originally developed in response to a specification for CIDNA for an eight-seat airliner, but the second incarnation of Bernard's aircraft manufacturing company went bankrupt before production could take place.

When the company was revived in 1927, it built a second example specifically for Paul Tarascon to make an attempt at the Orteig Prize. The space originally reserved for passenger seating was filled with fuel tanks to give the plane an expected range of 6,600 km (4,100 mi). It was also fitted with undercarriage that could be jettisoned after takeoff to save weight. Designated 18GR (for Grand Raid) and christened Oiseau Tango ("Tango Bird", after its bright yellow colour, intended to assist rescue efforts in case of a ditching), it was discovered that with the necessary fuel load, the aircraft could not actually become airborne. After Charles Lindbergh successfully claimed the prize, the 18GR was converted back to standard 18T configuration and sold to an operator in Canada.

== Variants ==
- 18T
- 18GR

== Specifications (18T) ==
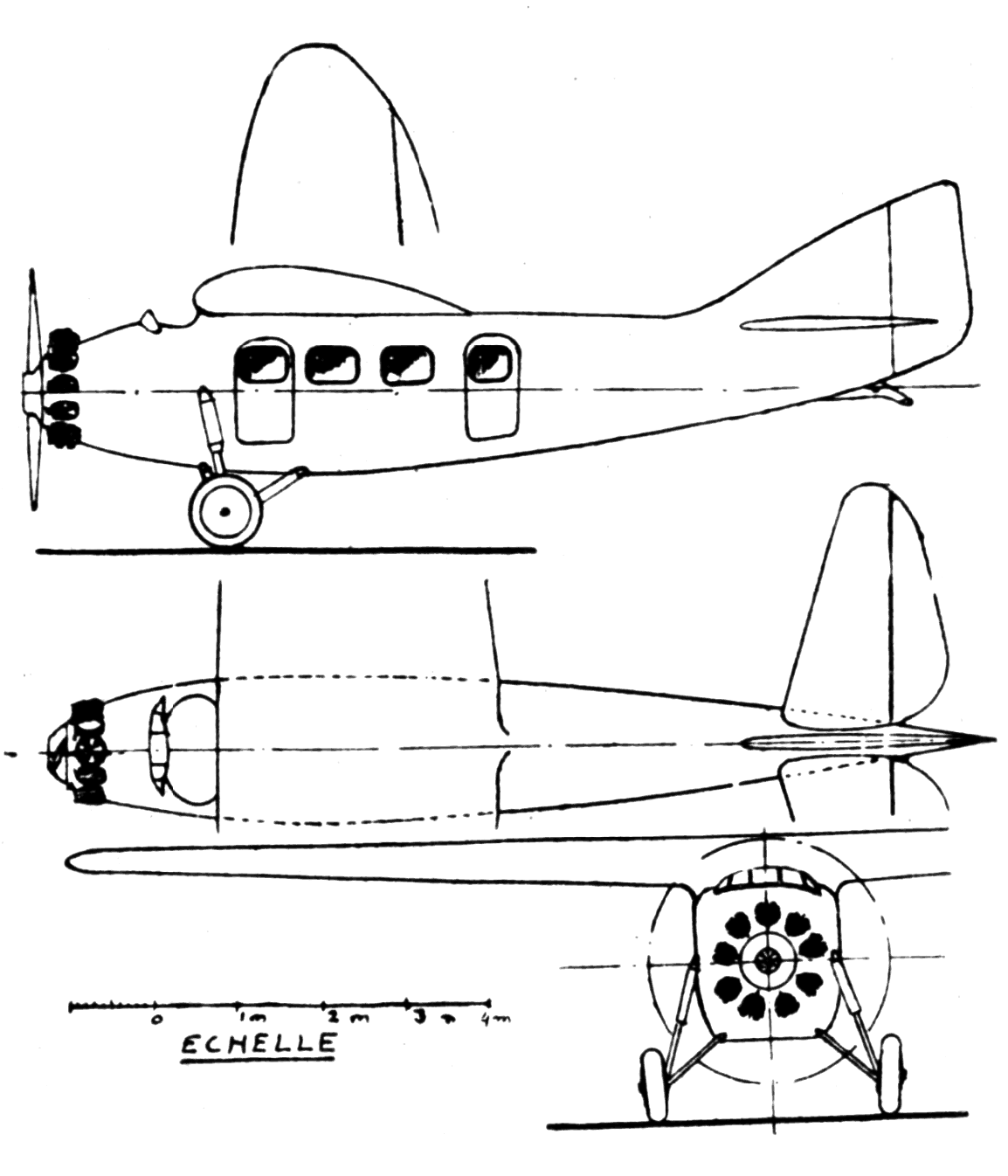
Bernard 18 3-view drawing from L'Aérophile-Salon1926

General characteristics

- Crew: two
- Capacity: eight passengers
- Length: 11.44 m (37 ft 6 in)
- Wingspan: 16.80 m (55 ft 1 in)
- Height: 3.45 m (11 ft 4 in)
- Wing area: 41.8 m^{2} (450 sq ft)
- Empty weight: 1,820 kg (4,010 lb)
- Gross weight: 2,700 kg (5,950 lb)
- Powerplant: 1 × Gnome et Rhône 9Ab air-cooled radial piston engine , 313 kW (420 hp)

Performance

- Range: 226 km (141 mi, 123 nmi)

== See also ==
Related development

- Bernard 190

Aircraft of comparable role, configuration, and era

- Focke-Wulf A 17
- Fokker F.XIV
- Kalinin K-5
- Latécoère 28
- Messerschmitt M 18
- Nieuport-Delage NiD 540

== Bibliography ==
- Liron, Jean (1990). Les avions Bernard. Collection Docavia. Vol. 31. Paris: Éditions Larivière. ISBN 2-84890-065-2.
- Taylor, Michael J. H. (1989). Jane's Encyclopedia of Aviation. London: Studio Editions. p. 154.
