= Saint-Ciers-sur-Bonnieure =

- Commune
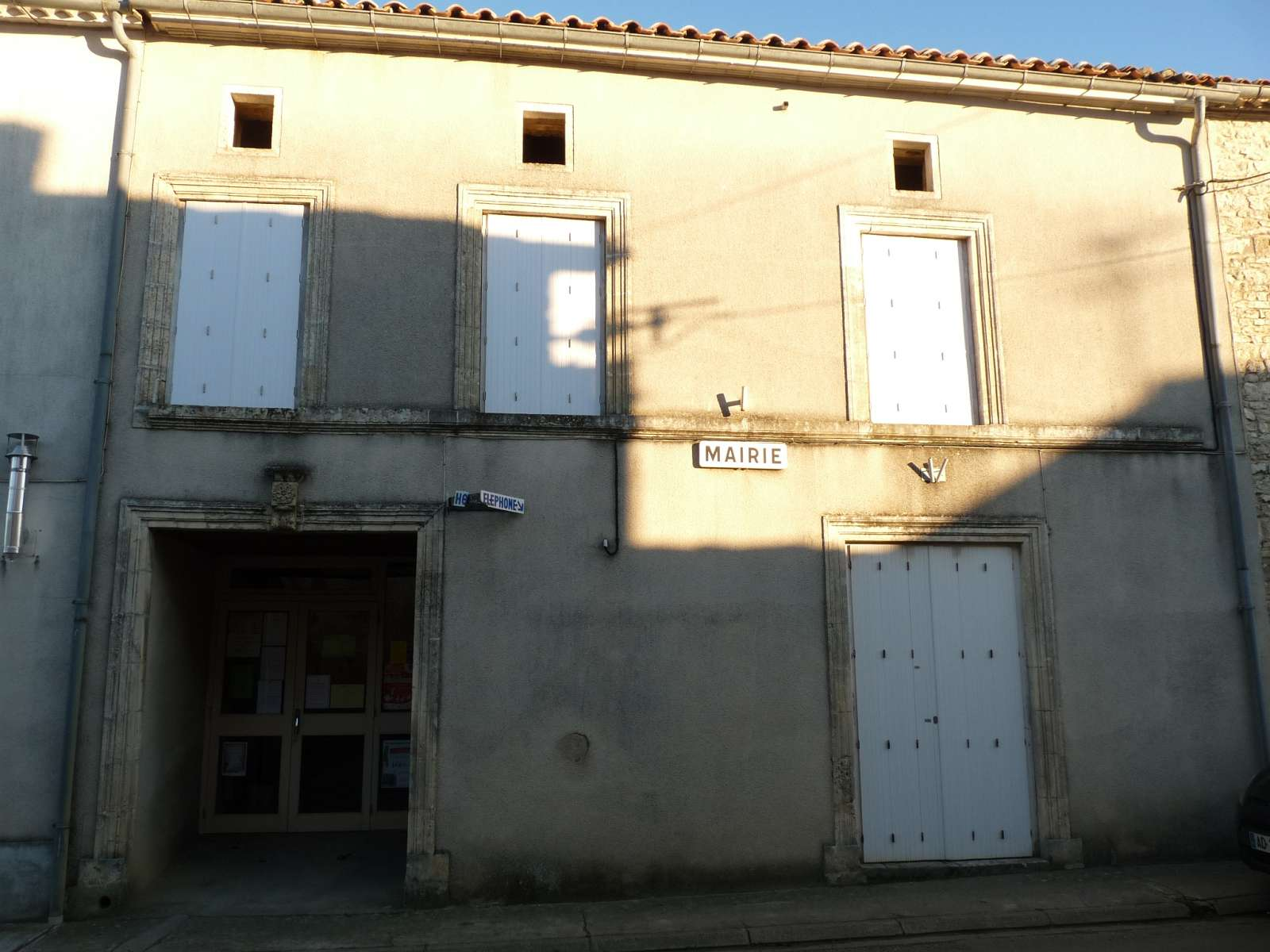
- Town hall
- Location of Saint-Ciers-sur-Bonnieure
- Location within France Location within Nouvelle-Aquitaine
- Coordinates: 45°51′38″N 0°14′43″E
- Country: France
- Region: Nouvelle-Aquitaine
- Department: Charente
- Arrondissement: Confolens
- Canton: Boixe-et-Manslois

Government
  - Mayor (2020–2026): Anne Teillet
- Area^{1}: 10.44 km^{2} (4.03 sq mi)
- Elevation: 60 m (200 ft)
- Highest elevation: 122 m (400 ft)
- Lowest elevation: 60 m (200 ft)
- Population (2023): 312
  - Density: 29.9/km^{2} (77.4/sq mi)
- Time zone: UTC+01:00 (CET)
  - Summer (DST): UTC+02:00 (CEST)
- INSEE/Postal code: 16307 /16230
- ^{1} French Land Register data, which excludes lakes, ponds, glaciers > 1 km^{2} (0.386 sq mi or 247 acres) and river estuaries.

Saint-Ciers-sur-Bonnieure (French pronunciation: [sɛ̃ sje syʁ bɔnjœʁ], literally Saint-Ciers on Bonnieure, before 1962: Saint-Ciers) is a commune in the Charente department in southwestern France.

== Population ==
Historical population
Year	Pop.	±% p.a.
1968	271	—
1975	264	−0.37%
1982	256	−0.44%
1990	240	−0.80%
1999	256	+0.72%
2007	291	+1.61%
2012	307	+1.08%
2017	334	+1.70%
2023	312	−1.13%
Source: INSEE

== See also ==
- Communes of the Charente department
