= Bernard 15 =

AB 15
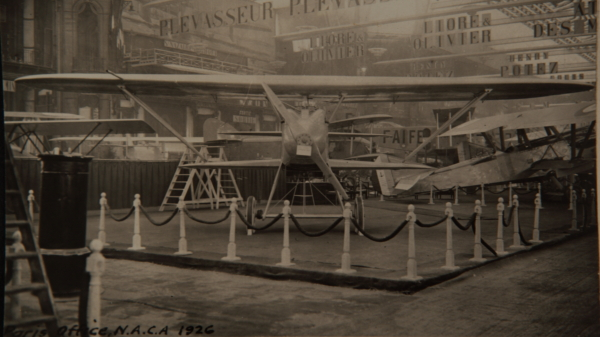

General information
- Type: Single-seat sesquiplane fighter aircraft
- National origin: France
- Manufacturer: Société Industrielle des Métaux et du Bois (SIMB), sometimes referred to as Ferbois
- Designer: Jean Hubert
- Number built: 1

History
- First flight: 1926
- Developed from: Bernard SIMB AB 14

The Bernard 15 C1 or Bernard SIMB AB 15 was a 1920s French single-seat sesquiplane fighter aircraft designed and built by the Société Industrielle des Métaux et du Bois (SIMB). With the structural failure of the earlier Bernard 14 the Bernard 15 was an improved variant with a greater span upper wing. It was powered by a Hispano-Suiza 12Hb inline piston engine and had a fixed tailskid landing gear. The performance was not an improvement on the Bernard SIMB AB 14 and only the prototype was built.

== Specifications ==
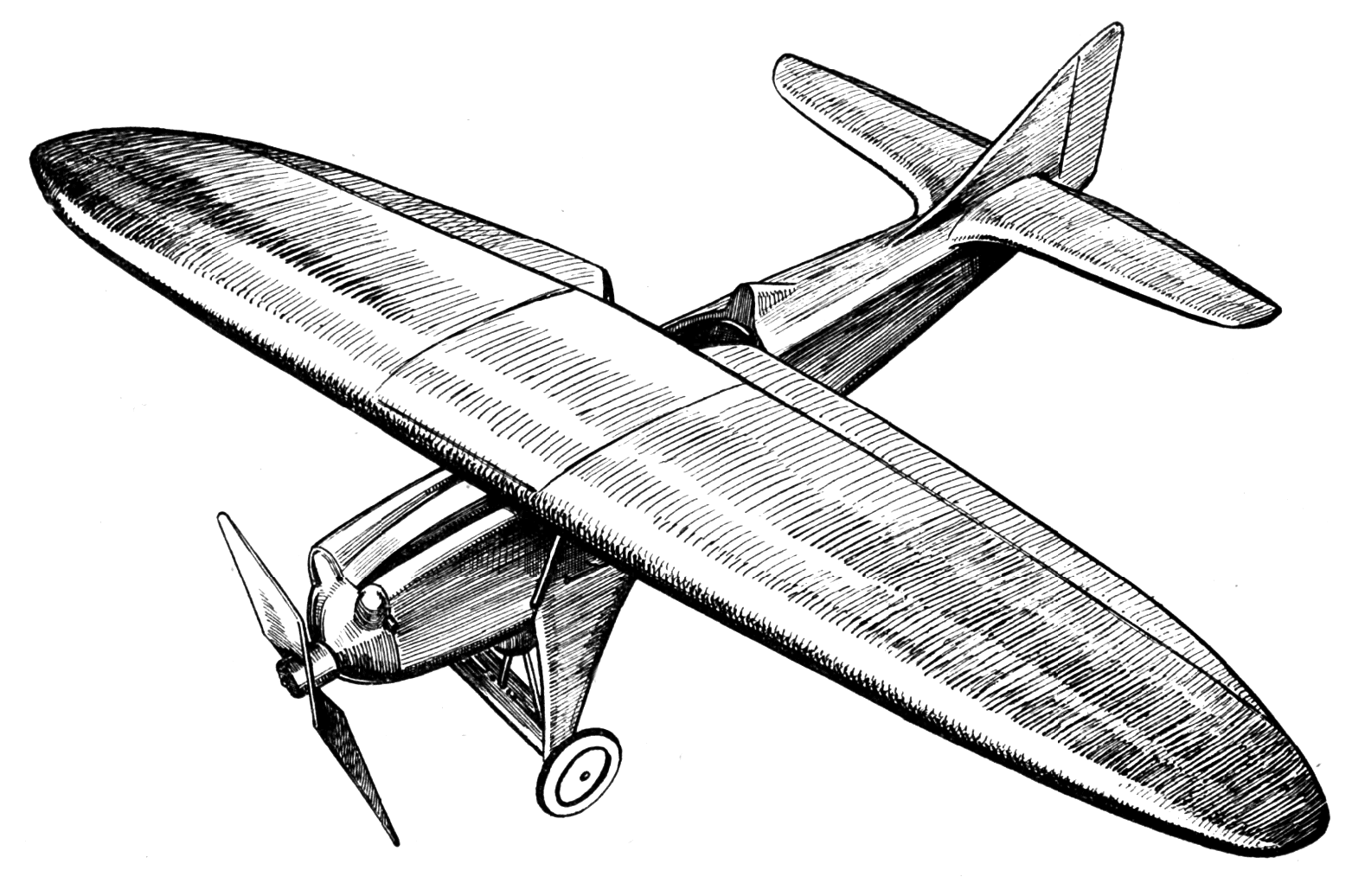
Bernard 15 perspective drawing from L'Aéronautique January,1927

Data from Illustrated Encyclopedia of Aircraft

General characteristics

- Crew: 1
- Length: 7.50 m (24 ft 7 in)
- Wingspan: 11.40 m (37 ft 5 in)
- Height: 3.10 m (10 ft 2 in)
- Wing area: 24 m^{2} (260 sq ft)
- Max takeoff weight: 1,790 kg (3,946 lb)
- Powerplant: 1 × Hispano-Suiza 12Hb inline piston engine, 370 kW (500 hp)
- Propellers: 2-bladed

Performance

- Maximum speed: 270 km/h (170 mph, 150 kn)
- Service ceiling: 7,500 m (24,600 ft)

Armament

- Guns: Two fixed Vickers .303 (7.7mm) synchronised machine-guns

== See also ==
Related development

- Bernard 14

== Bibliography ==
- Bruner, Georges (1977). "Fighters a la Francaise, Part One". Air Enthusiast (3): 85–95. ISSN 0143-5450.
- The Illustrated Encyclopedia of Aircraft (Part Work 1982-1985). Orbis Publishing.
- Liron, Jean (1990). Les avions Bernard. Collection Docavia. Vol. 31. Paris: Éditions Larivière. ISBN 2-84890-065-2.
