= Sainte-Colombe, Charente =

Sainte-Colombe
- Part of Val-de-Bonnieure
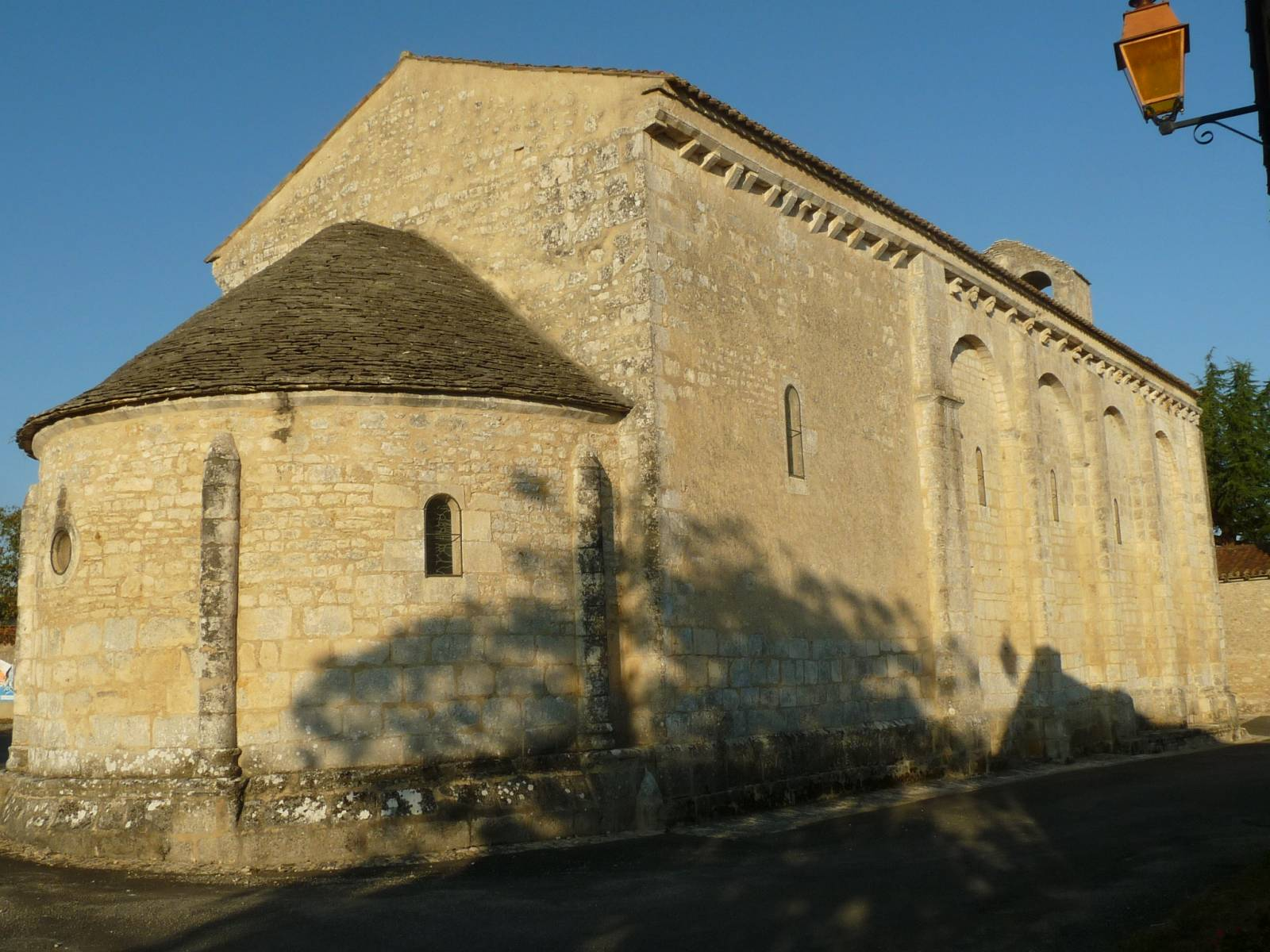
- Location of Sainte-Colombe
- Location within France Location within Nouvelle-Aquitaine
- Coordinates: 45°50′03″N 0°19′11″E
- Country: France
- Region: Nouvelle-Aquitaine
- Department: Charente
- Arrondissement: Confolens
- Canton: Boixe-et-Manslois
- Commune: Val-de-Bonnieure
- Area^{1}: 6.50 km^{2} (2.51 sq mi)
- Elevation: 78 m (256 ft)
- Highest elevation: 129 m (423 ft)
- Lowest elevation: 75 m (246 ft)
- Population (2017): 198
  - Density: 30.5/km^{2} (78.9/sq mi)
- Time zone: UTC+01:00 (CET)
  - Summer (DST): UTC+02:00 (CEST)
- Postal code: 16230
- ^{1} French Land Register data, which excludes lakes, ponds, glaciers > 1 km^{2} (0.386 sq mi or 247 acres) and river estuaries.

Sainte-Colombe (French pronunciation: [sɛ̃t kɔlɔ̃b]; Limousin: Senta Colomba) is a former commune in the Charente department in southwestern France. On 1 January 2018, it was merged into the new commune of Val-de-Bonnieure.

== Population ==
Historical population

Year	Pop.	±% p.a.
1793	445	—
1821	428	−0.14%
1846	494	+0.58%
1872	509	+0.12%
1901	359	−1.20%
1926	322	−0.43%
1946	283	−0.64%
1962	279	−0.09%

Year	Pop.	±% p.a.
1968	282	+0.18%
1975	217	−3.67%
1982	195	−1.52%
1990	174	−1.41%
1999	185	+0.68%
2006	186	+0.08%
2017	198	+0.57%

Source: EHESS and INSEE (2017)

== See also ==
- Communes of the Charente department
