= Rivières, Charente =

Rivières
- Commune
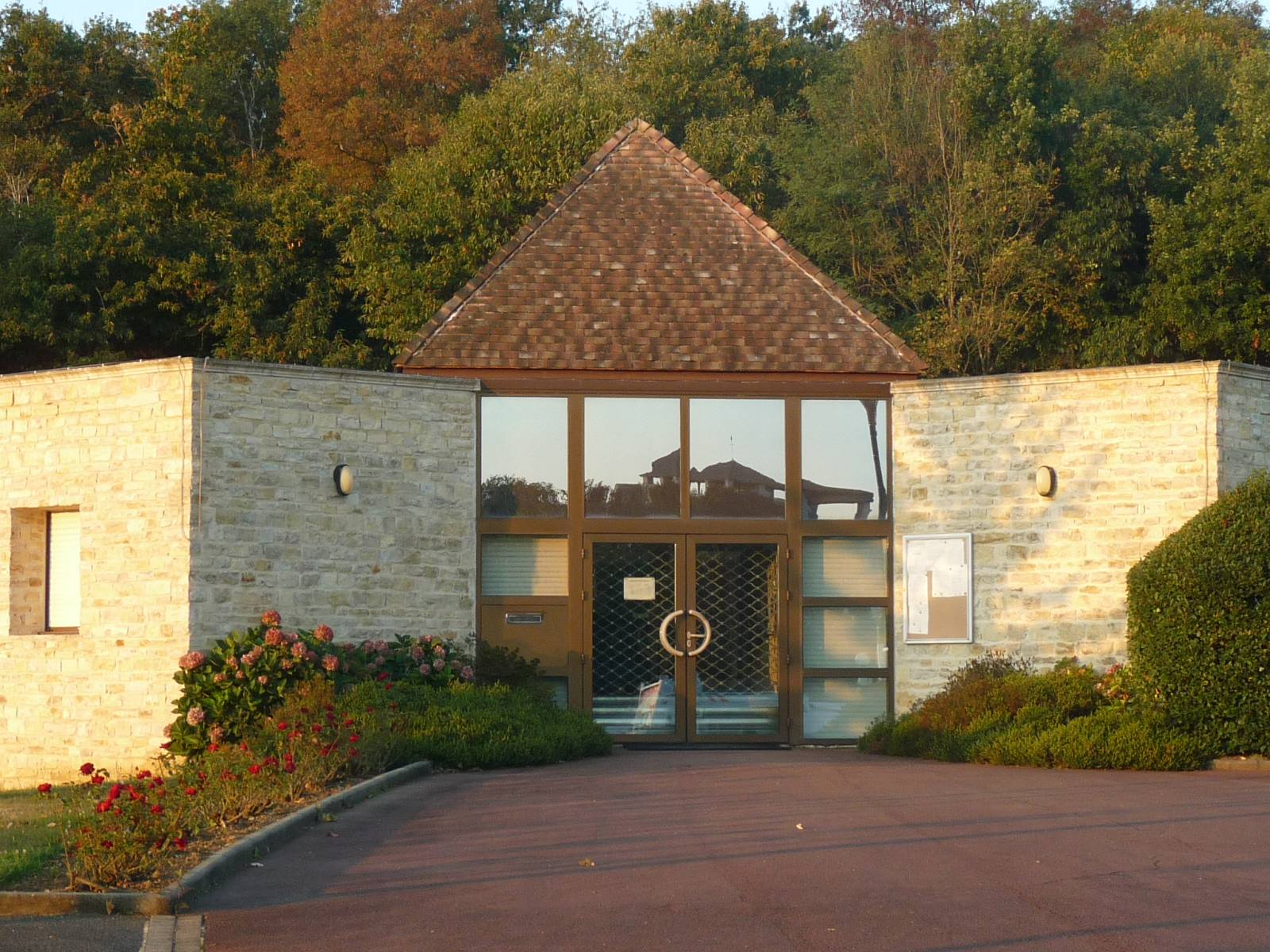
- The town hall in Rivières
- Location of Rivières
- Location within France Location within Nouvelle-Aquitaine
- Coordinates: 45°45′13″N 0°21′46″E
- Country: France
- Region: Nouvelle-Aquitaine
- Department: Charente
- Arrondissement: Angoulême
- Canton: Val de Tardoire
- Intercommunality: La Rochefoucauld - Porte du Périgord

Government
  - Mayor (2020–2026): Viviane Bourgoin-Zorzoli
- Area^{1}: 21.54 km^{2} (8.32 sq mi)
- Elevation: 108 m (354 ft)
- Highest elevation: 156 m (512 ft)
- Lowest elevation: 65 m (213 ft)
- Population (2023): 2,015
  - Density: 93.55/km^{2} (242.3/sq mi)
- Time zone: UTC+01:00 (CET)
  - Summer (DST): UTC+02:00 (CEST)
- INSEE/Postal code: 16280 /16110
- ^{1} French Land Register data, which excludes lakes, ponds, glaciers > 1 km^{2} (0.386 sq mi or 247 acres) and river estuaries.

Rivières (French pronunciation: [ʁivjɛʁ]; Occitan: Rivieras) is a commune in the Charente department in southwestern France. The names originate from the 2 rivers crossing the municipality: La Tardoire and le Bandiat.

== Population ==
Historical population
Year	Pop.	±% p.a.
1968	1,106	—
1975	1,212	+1.32%
1982	1,484	+2.93%
1990	1,587	+0.84%
1999	1,737	+1.01%
2007	1,883	+1.01%
2012	1,882	−0.01%
2017	1,999	+1.21%
2023	2,015	+0.13%
Source: INSEE

== See also ==
- Communes of the Charente department
