= Bernard SIMB AB 14 =

AB 14
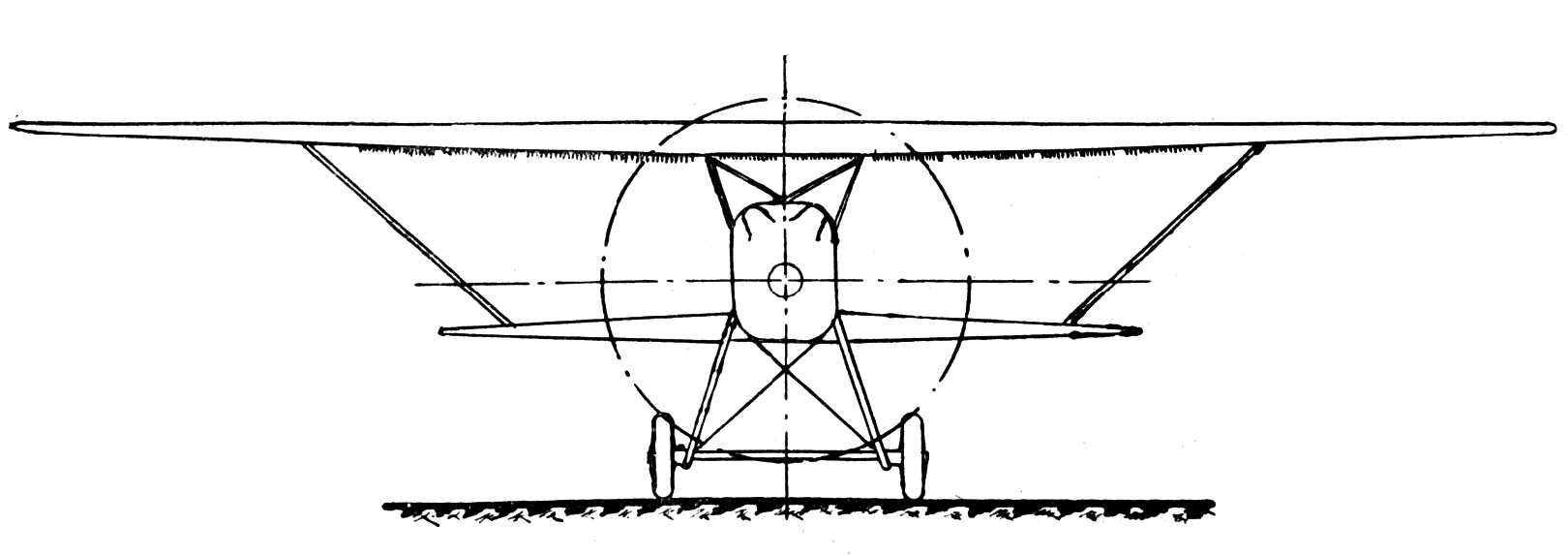

General information
- Type: Single-seat sesquiplane fighter aircraft
- National origin: France
- Manufacturer: Société Industrielle des Métaux et du Bois (SIMB), sometimes referred to as Ferbois
- Designer: Jean Hubert
- Number built: 1

History
- First flight: 1925
- Retired: 1926
- Variant: Bernard SIMB AB 15

The Bernard SIMB AB 14 was a 1920s French single-seat sesquiplane fighter aircraft designed and built by the Société Industrielle des Métaux et du Bois (SIMB). With a reluctance of the French authorities to purchase monoplanes the Bernard 14 was designed as a sesquiplane with Y-form struts bracing the wings on each side. It was powered by a Hispano-Suiza 12Hb inline piston engine and had a fixed tailskid landing gear. While on a test flight on 22 February 1926 the aircraft suffered a catastrophic structural failure of the upper wing and the only Bernard 14 was destroyed.

== Specifications ==
Data from

General characteristics

- Crew: 1
- Length: 7.40 m (24 ft 3 in)
- Wingspan: 12.50 m (41 ft 0 in)
- Height: 3.10 m (10 ft 2 in)
- Wing area: 27 m^{2} (290 sq ft)
- Empty weight: 1,240 kg (2,734 lb)
- Max takeoff weight: 1,800 kg (3,968 lb)
- Powerplant: 1 × Hispano-Suiza 12Hb inline piston engine, 370 kW (500 hp)
- Propellers: 2-bladed

Performance

- Maximum speed: 230 km/h (140 mph, 120 kn)

Armament

- Guns: Two fixed 7.7mm (0.303in) synchronised machine-guns

== Bibliography ==
- Bruner, Georges (1977). "Fighters a la Francaise, Part One". Air Enthusiast (3): 85–95. ISSN 0143-5450.
- The Illustrated Encyclopedia of Aircraft (Part Work 1982-1985). Orbis Publishing.
- Liron, Jean (1990). Les avions Bernard. Collection Docavia. Vol. 31. Paris: Éditions Larivière. ISBN 2-84890-065-2.
