= Saint-Amant-de-Bonnieure =

- Part of Val-de-Bonnieure
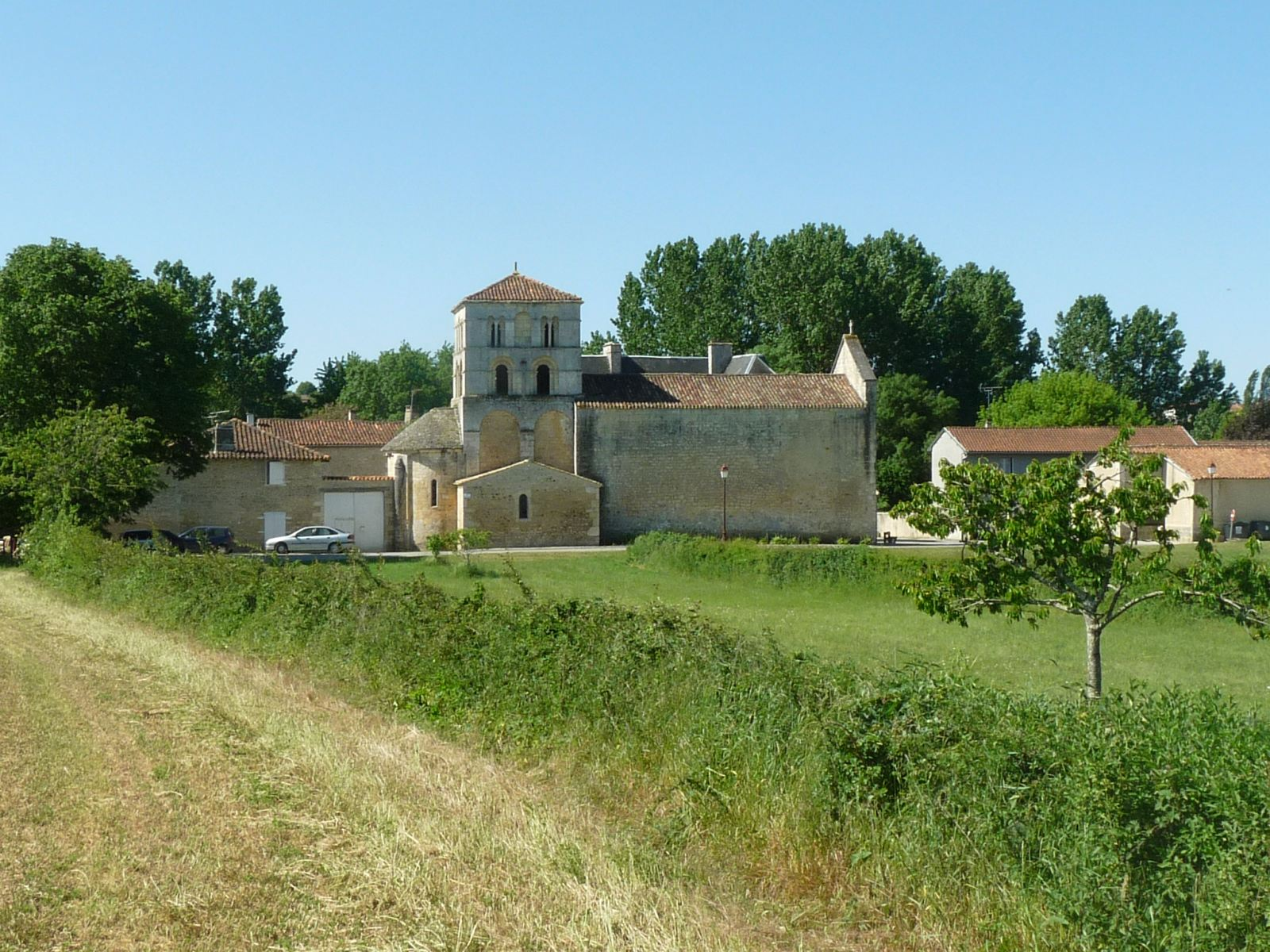

- Coat of arms
- Location of Saint-Amant-de-Bonnieure
- Location within France Location within Nouvelle-Aquitaine
- Coordinates: 45°51′11″N 0°17′39″E
- Country: France
- Region: Nouvelle-Aquitaine
- Department: Charente
- Arrondissement: Confolens
- Canton: Boixe-et-Manslois
- Commune: Val-de-Bonnieure
- Area^{1}: 10.67 km^{2} (4.12 sq mi)
- Elevation: 73 m (240 ft)
- Highest elevation: 129 m (423 ft)
- Lowest elevation: 65 m (213 ft)
- Population (2017): 363
  - Density: 34.0/km^{2} (88.1/sq mi)
- Time zone: UTC+01:00 (CET)
  - Summer (DST): UTC+02:00 (CEST)
- Postal code: 16230
- ^{1} French Land Register data, which excludes lakes, ponds, glaciers > 1 km^{2} (0.386 sq mi or 247 acres) and river estuaries.

Saint-Amant-de-Bonnieure (French pronunciation: [sɛ̃.t‿amɑ̃ də bɔnjœʁ], literally Saint-Amant of Bonnieure) is a former commune in the Charente department in southwestern France. On 1 January 2018, it was merged into the new commune of Val-de-Bonnieure.

== Population ==
Historical population

| Year | Pop. | ±% p.a. |
|---|---|---|
| 1793 | 773 | — |
| 1821 | 891 | +0.51% |
| 1846 | 857 | −0.16% |
| 1872 | 692 | −0.82% |
| 1901 | 661 | −0.16% |
| 1926 | 556 | −0.69% |
| 1946 | 446 | −1.10% |
| 1962 | 389 | −0.85% |

| Year | Pop. | ±% p.a. |
|---|---|---|
| 1968 | 357 | −1.42% |
| 1975 | 309 | −2.04% |
| 1982 | 315 | +0.28% |
| 1990 | 297 | −0.73% |
| 1999 | 315 | +0.66% |
| 2006 | 337 | +0.97% |
| 2017 | 363 | +0.68% |

Source: EHESS and INSEE (2017)

== See also ==
- Communes of the Charente department
