= Jean Hubert (aircraft designer) =

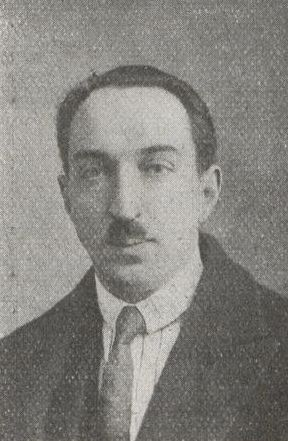
- Born: 4 November 1885; Saint-Vaast-la-Hougue, Lower Normandy France
- Died: 2 November 1927 (aged 41); Car accident at Formigny, France
- Education: Institut industriel du Nord (École Centrale de Lille)
- Occupation: Aircraft designer
- Known for: Bernard 18 Oiseau Tango; Bernard 191GR Oiseau Canari (aircraft for first flight from France to North America)
- Awards: Légion d'honneur

Jean Hubert (4 November 1885 – 2 November 1927) was a French aviation pioneer and aircraft designer. He was the Chief Engineer of Société des Avions Bernard (French: Bernard Aircraft Company).

== Biography ==
Jean Hubert was born in Saint-Vaast-la-Houghe in France. He attended school in Cherbourg then at the Institut Industriel du Nord, where he graduated in electrical engineering.

In 1908, he was one of Wilbur Wright's first passengers in his first French flights at Auvours. He expanded his experience in aircraft design at the Esnault-Pelterie Aircraft Company, then at Breguet Aviation.

At the beginning of World War I, he volunteered as a pilot in Avord Air Base, then he designed several prototypes of fighter and bomber aircraft and helped to establish an aircraft factory for producing Caudron G.3s and SPAD XIIIs.

After the war, he joined Société des Avions Bernard where he designed several aircraft prototypes.

One of his prototypes, the Bernard SIMB V.2, piloted by Florentin Bonnet won the flight airspeed record on November 11, 1924 with 448.171 km/h. When he died in 1927, his Oiseau Tango prototype was renamed "Ingénieur Hubert" in his honor.

A version of his Bernard 190 prototype dubbed "Oiseau Canari" was used in the first successful French aerial crossing of the North-Atlantic in 1929.

== Airplanes designed by Jean Hubert ==
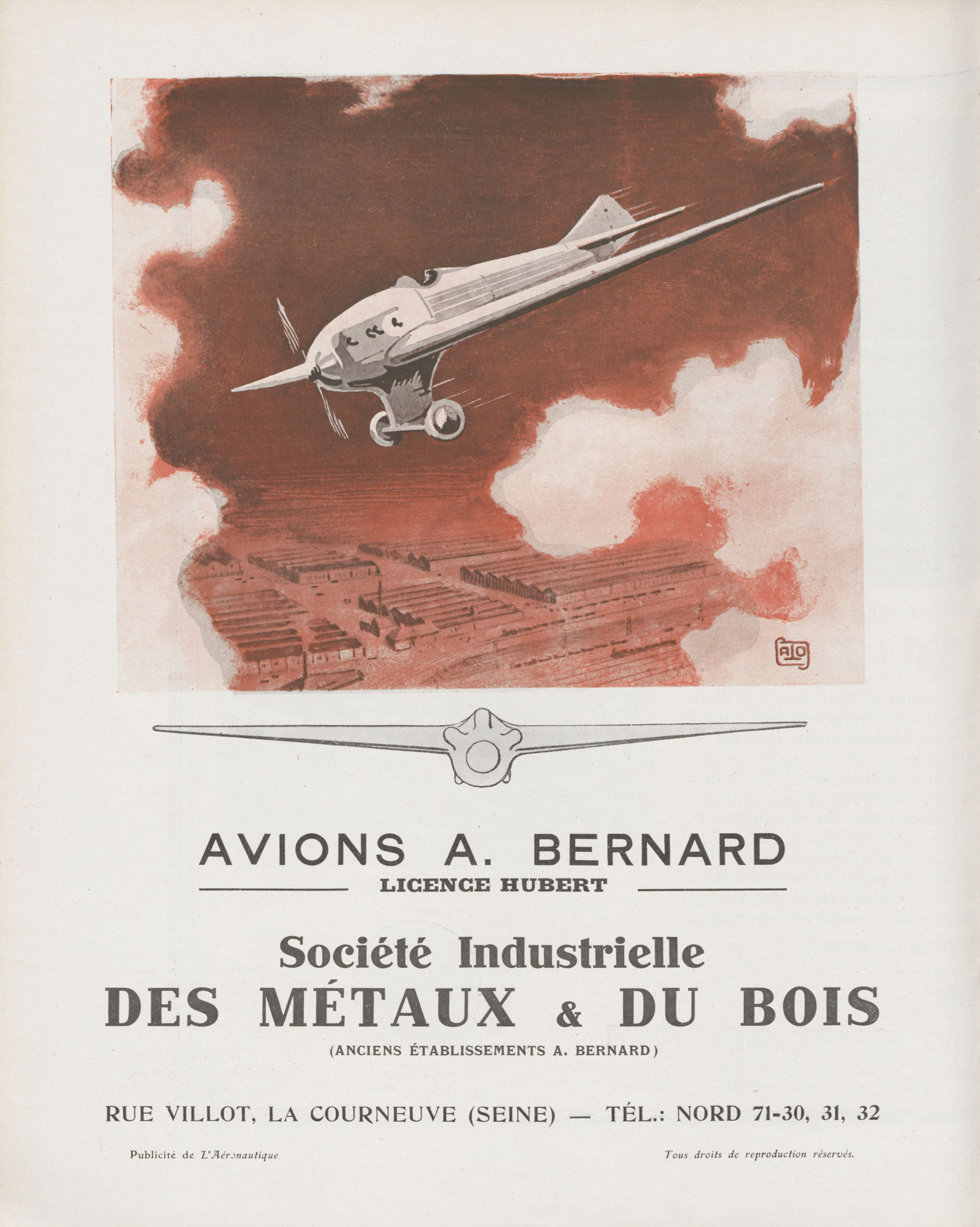
Avions Bernard Licence Hubert

- Bernard SIMB V.1 Racer. One built, 1924.
- Bernard SIMB V.2 V.1 with shorter span. One built, 1924. The V.3 was a proposed development with retractable undercarriage.
- Bernard SIMB AB 10 Revision of AB.C1, 1924.
- Bernard SIMB AB 14 Fighter. One built, 1925.
- Bernard SIMB AB 15 Fighter. One built, 1926.
- Bernard 18 Eight seat transports. Two built, 1927.
- Bernard 190 Ten seat transports, Fourteen built, 1928 (first flight).
