= Feuillade, Charente =

Feuillade
- Commune
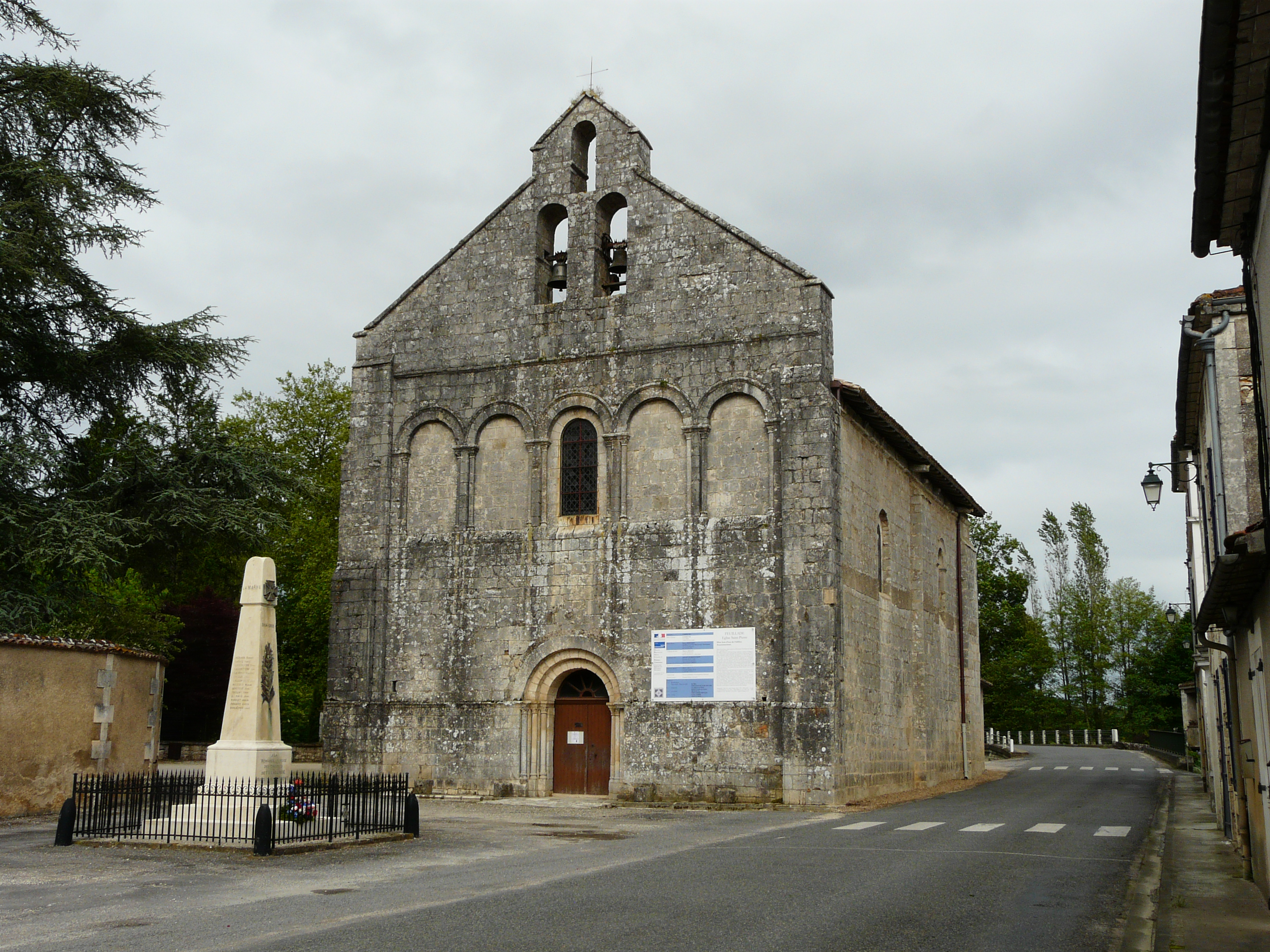
- War memorial and church of St. Peter
- Location of Feuillade
- Location within France Location within Nouvelle-Aquitaine
- Coordinates: 45°36′28″N 0°28′21″E
- Country: France
- Region: Nouvelle-Aquitaine
- Department: Charente
- Arrondissement: Angoulême
- Canton: Val de Tardoire
- Intercommunality: La Rochefoucauld - Porte du Périgord

Government
  - Mayor (2020–2026): Michel Delage
- Area^{1}: 21.83 km^{2} (8.43 sq mi)
- Elevation: 112 m (367 ft)
- Highest elevation: 201 m (659 ft)
- Lowest elevation: 102 m (335 ft)
- Population (2023): 283
  - Density: 13.0/km^{2} (33.6/sq mi)
- Time zone: UTC+01:00 (CET)
  - Summer (DST): UTC+02:00 (CEST)
- INSEE/Postal code: 16137 /16380
- ^{1} French Land Register data, which excludes lakes, ponds, glaciers > 1 km^{2} (0.386 sq mi or 247 acres) and river estuaries.

Feuillade (French pronunciation: [fœjad]; Occitan: Folhada) is a commune in the Charente department in southwestern France.

== Population ==
Historical population
Year	Pop.	±% p.a.
1968	361	—
1975	361	+0.00%
1982	355	−0.24%
1990	330	−0.91%
1999	315	−0.52%
2007	303	−0.48%
2012	292	−0.74%
2017	310	+1.20%
2023	283	−1.51%
Source: INSEE

== See also ==
- Communes of the Charente department
