= Bernard SIMB V.1 =

French airplane

General information
- Type: Racing aircraft
- National origin: France
- Manufacturer: Société Industrielle des Métaux et du Bois (SIMB)
- Designer: Jean Hubert
- Number built: 1

History
- First flight: May 1924

The Bernard SIMB V.1 was a French single seat racing monoplane designed to compete for the 1924 Beaumont Cup. It crashed on its first flight and was not rebuilt.

== Design and development ==
The Bernard V.1 is alternatively known as the SIMB V.1: the Société Industrielle des Métaux et du Bois (SIMB) was the second of several aircraft companies founded successively by Adolphe Bernard. The V.1 was a single-engine, single-seat monoplane designed to compete for the Beaumont Cup, a French competition held in 1924 requiring a 300 km (186 mi) flight round a 50 km (31 mi) circuit at Istres at an average speed of over 290 km/h (180 mph).

The V.1 had a cantilever shoulder wing of thin section, built around four spars with plywood and fabric covering. Straight edged beyond the centre section, it tapered only slightly to the oblique tips. The tailplane had curved, swept leading edges and carried split elevators with a cut-out for rudder movement. The fin was almost triangular, with a slightly convex leading edge; it carried a pointed rudder on a vertical hinge extending to the bottom of the fuselage.

The smooth, oval section fuselage was ply and fabric covered, tapering towards the tail. The pilot sat low down in a small open cockpit with narrow streamlined dorsal fairings in front and behind. His view forward was severely restricted by the central inline bank of four cylinders of the W-12 Lorraine-Dietrich 12E water-cooled piston engine. The engine was cooled by radiators in the wings, assisted for the first flight by a bank of radiators mounted between the undercarriage legs. These backward leaning legs were wide chord, faired cantilevers with large, unfaired wheels mounted on individual stub axles. The V.1's conventional undercarriage was completed by a small tailskid.

The racer was completed in nine months and taken to Istres in May 1924 to prepare for the competition. Its first flight, piloted by Florentine Bonnet, ended in disaster. It was immediately apparent that the V.1 lacked longitudinal stability, oscillating uncontrollably in altitude; these oscillations persisted even as Bonnet reduced speed and attempted to land and the V.1 crashed at 200 km/h (125 mph), sliding on its back. Bonnet was fortunate to escape unhurt. The instability was ascribed to insufficient tailplane area combined with a far forward centre of gravity. With the race only a few days away, there was no time to repair the V.1 and development was abandoned.

== Specifications ==
Data from Liron

General characteristics

- Crew: 16.50
- Wingspan: 10.50 m (34 ft 5 in)
- Height: 2.50 m (8 ft 2 in)
- Wing area: 15.50 m^{2} (166.8 sq ft)
- Empty weight: 900 kg (1,984 lb)
- Gross weight: 1,050 kg (2,315 lb)
- Powerplant: 1 × Lorraine-Dietrich 12E W-12 water-cooled piston engine, 332 kW (445 hp)
- Propellers: 2-bladed Levasseur (licence built Reed), metal, 2.45 m (8 ft 0 in) diameter

Performance

- Maximum speed: 420 km/h (260 mph, 230 kn) estimated

== Bibliography ==
- Liron, Jean (1990). Les avions Bernard. Collection Docavia. Vol. 31. Paris: Éditions Larivière. ISBN 2-84890-065-2.
