= Bonnieure =

River in France

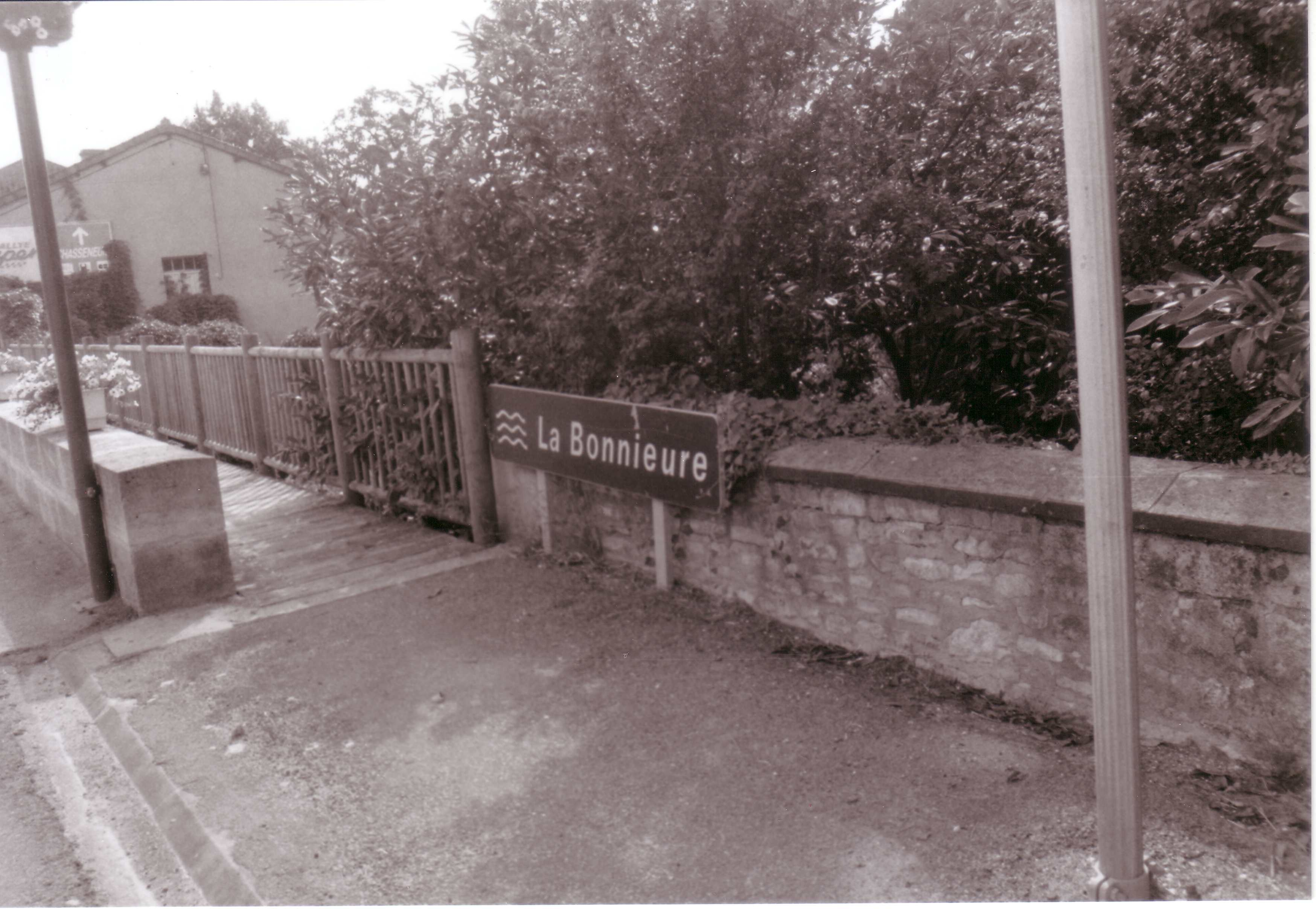

- Location within France Location within Nouvelle-Aquitaine

Location
- Country: France

Physical characteristics
- Mouth
  - location: Charente
  - coordinates: 45°52′33″N 0°12′27″E
- Length: 46.9 km (29.1 mi)
- Basin size: 203 km^{2} (78 mi^{2})
- Discharge
  - average: 1.49 m^{3}/s (53 cu ft/s)

Basin features
- Progression: Charente→ Atlantic Ocean

The Bonnieure (French pronunciation: [bɔnjœʁ]) is a river in the Charente département, southwestern France, left tributary to the river Charente. It is 46.9 km (29.1 mi) long. Its source is in Genouillac, in the east of the department. It flows into the Charente near Mansle. Another town along the Bonnieure is Chasseneuil-sur-Bonnieure. The Tardoire is a left tributary of the Bonnieure.
