= History of Charente =

French department established in 1790

Administrative map of Charente.

Charente is a French department that was established in 1790 based on geographic criteria, the upper and middle basin of the Charente River, and historical reasons. Its central part corresponds to the former diocese and then the county of Angoumois. Before the Revolution, this region did not have political, religious, or judicial unity. Its history has been closely associated with Aquitaine. However, the county of Angoumois, a royal birthplace, has had a distinct history and has played a significant role in the history of France.

Charente is rich in historical sites that reflect continuous human settlement from the Paleolithic era through the Neolithic and the Iron Age. Following a prosperous Gallo-Roman period, the early Middle Ages witnessed ongoing Christianization, while the later Middle Ages saw the construction of Romanesque churches in every village. During the Hundred Years' War, Charente served as a frontier between the territories of the King of England and the King of France, enduring significant devastation. Despite a period of prosperity, particularly under Francis I, the Wars of Religion and the Protestant exodus led to economic stagnation, which only began to recover under Napoleon III with the rise of cognac production and industrialization in Angoulême.

== Prehistory ==
=== Paleolithic ===
Coat of arms of the Charente department.

The region corresponding to present-day Charente has been inhabited since the Lower Paleolithic era, as evidenced by the discovery of numerous Acheulean hand axes in the Charente alluvium. Situated 26 kilometers south of Angoulême, at Gardes-le-Pontaroux on the right bank of the Voultron, the site of La Quina has yielded fossil remains of 27 Neanderthals, including adults and children.

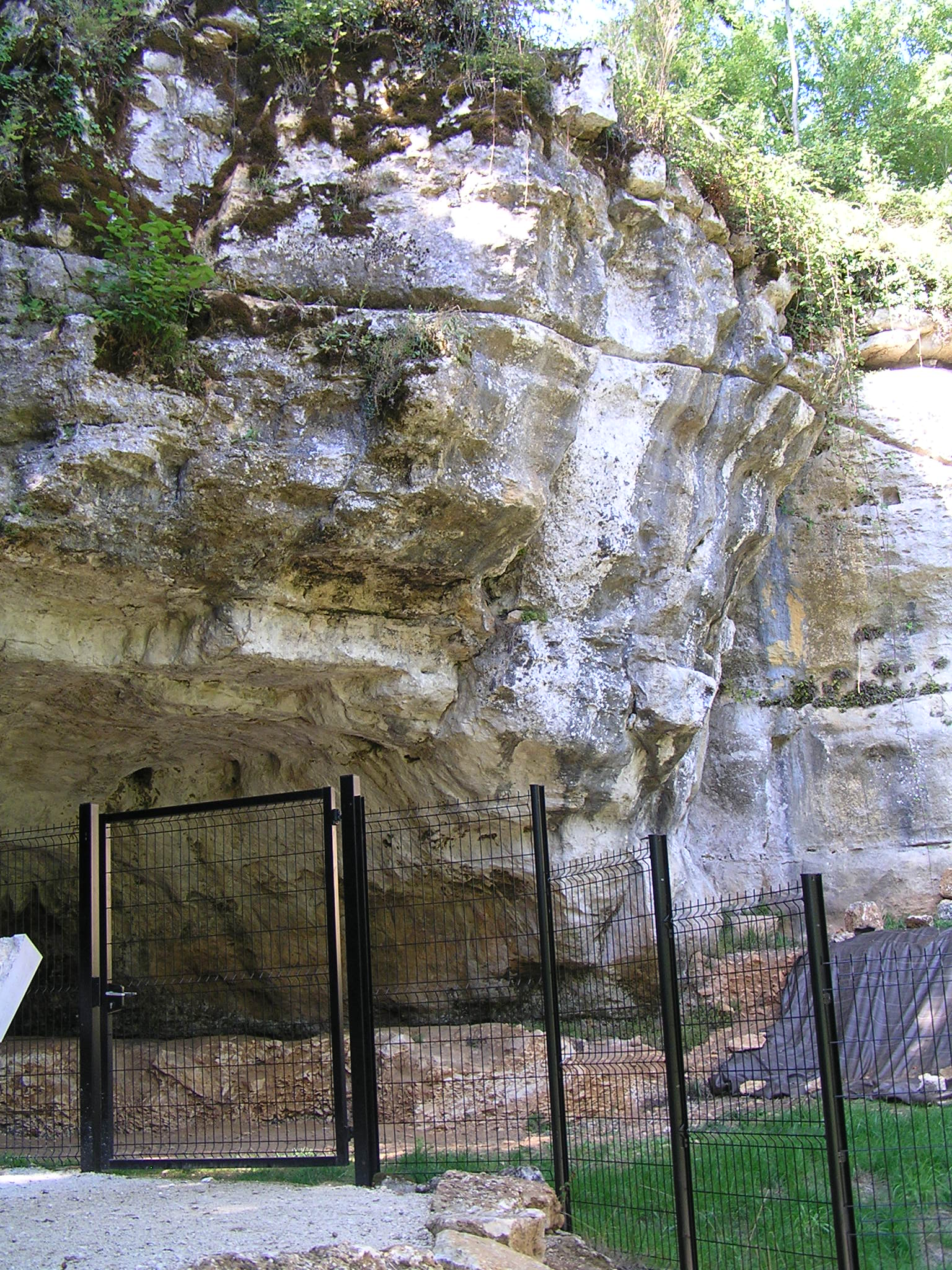
The Chaire-à-Calvin rock shelter.

The Upper Paleolithic period is evident at La Quina, where spears and ornaments, such as perforated wolf and fox teeth, have been discovered. Other significant sites include Roc de Sers, the Placard cave in Vilhonneur, the Chaire-à-Calvin shelter in Mouthiers, and the Montgaudier cave. The Visage cave in Vilhonneur, unearthed in 2005, showcases Upper Paleolithic artworks currently being studied. This decorated cave features various artworks, including a negative handprint in black paint, red and black dots, and a black line painting that may depict a human figure. Additionally, the cave contained the remains of a young adult dating around 27,000 years ago, identified as a Cro-Magnon man from the Gravettian culture.

On the left bank of the Tardoire, the Placard cave showcases a history spanning 15 millennia, from the Middle Paleolithic to the Solutrean period. It features parietal engravings of deer, horses, and aurochs, engraved reindeer bones and antlers; and a pink sandstone lamp. The Roc-de-Sers site, located in the Roc valley within a cliff cave, has revealed Aurignacian industries, a burial containing three skeletons, and sculpted friezes of horses, bison, and ibexes that are attributed to the Solutrean period.

At Mouthiers-sur-Boëme, the Chaire-à-Calvin rock shelter features a frieze of horses in the encrusted enamel, attributed to the Magdalenian culture. This culture is also evident in the Montgaudier cave near Montbron, where a carved reindeer antler baton depicting seals was discovered.

=== Neolithic ===
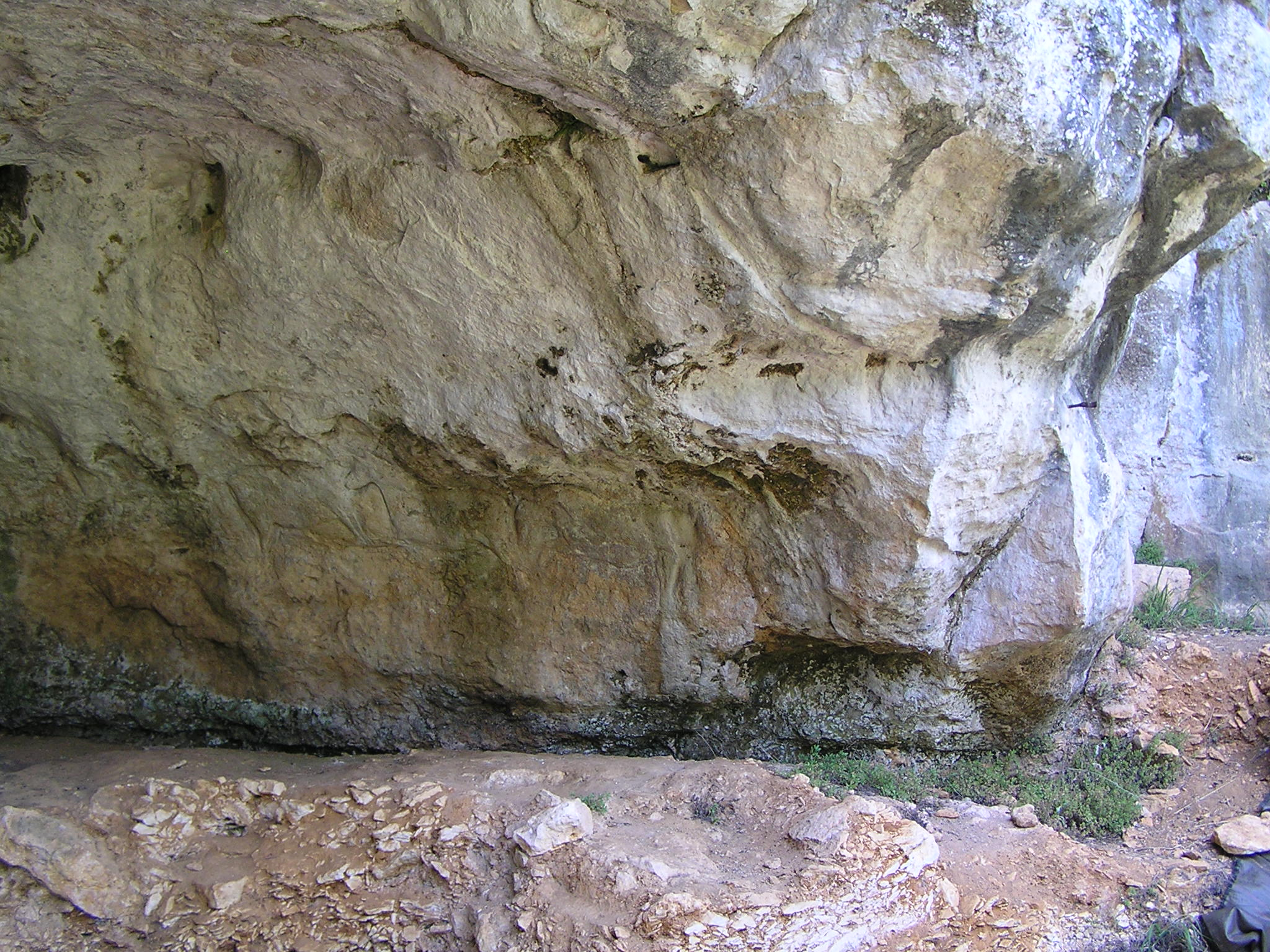
Frieze of horses.

Fortified camps from the Late Neolithic period are abundant, with examples found in Matignon, Peu-Richard in Charente saintongeaise, and Vienne-Charente cultures in the interior dating back to the 4th millennium BC. Prominent sites include Matignon at Juillac-le-Coq, Fontbelle at Segonzac, and Chenommet, where discoveries of polished axes, sickles, toothed blades, grindstones, ceramics, and evidence of basketry have been made. Animal husbandry was a key activity, as indicated by bone remains primarily from domestic animals (cattle, pigs, sheep, and goats). Additionally, burials have been found within the ditches of these camps.

Dolmens were erected during the 5th and early 4th millennia, primarily in the Middle Neolithic period. They are abundant in Charente, either standing alone or grouped, originally covered by stone tumuli known as cairns. The oldest dolmens, some of which still exist in the Boixe forest, are circular dry stone funerary chambers with access corridors. Notable examples include dolmens at Cognac (Séchebec), Saint-Brice, Saint-Fort-sur-le-Né, Saint-Germain-de-Confolens, Luxé, Chenon, and Fontenille.

Knowledge of metals began at the end of the Neolithic period and gradually spread in western France during the 3rd millennium BC. The first copper artifacts appeared with the Artenac civilization. Bell Beaker culture groups were present, with their burials discovered but few settlements.

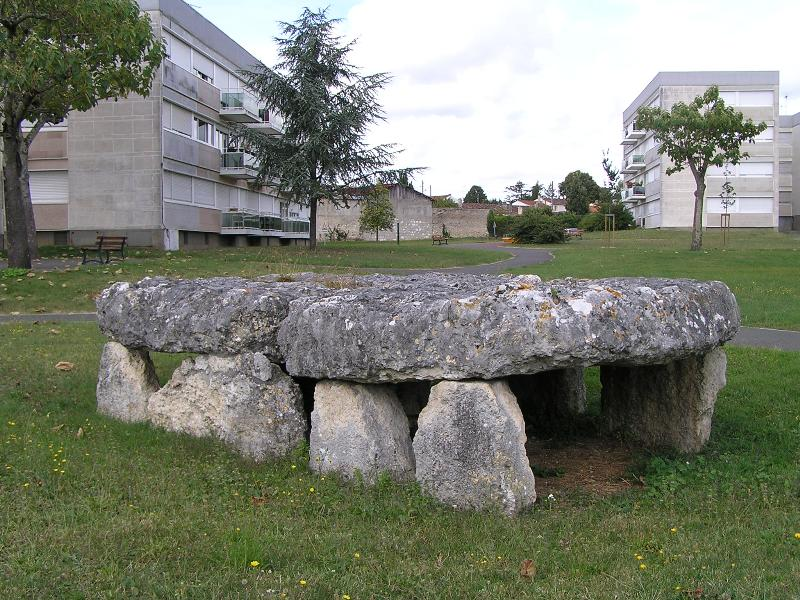
Dolmen de Séchebec, Cognac

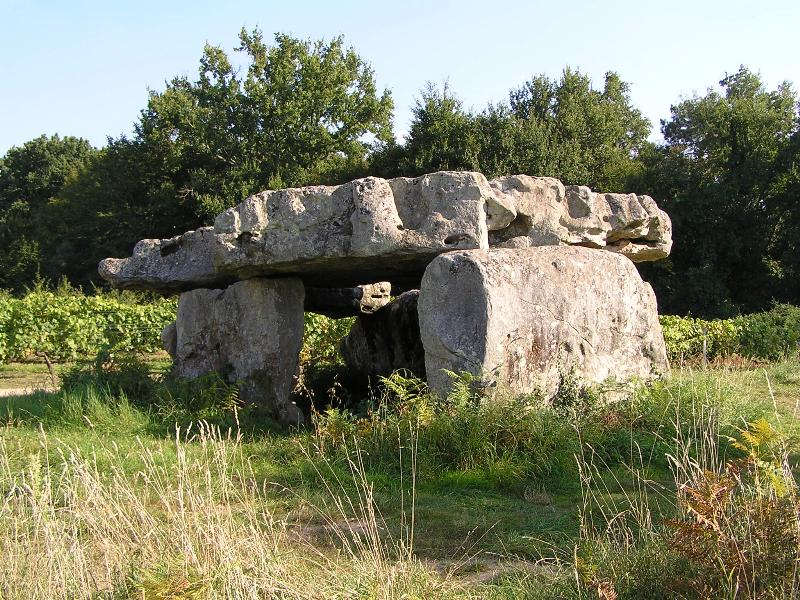
Dolmen de Garde-Épée, Saint-Brice

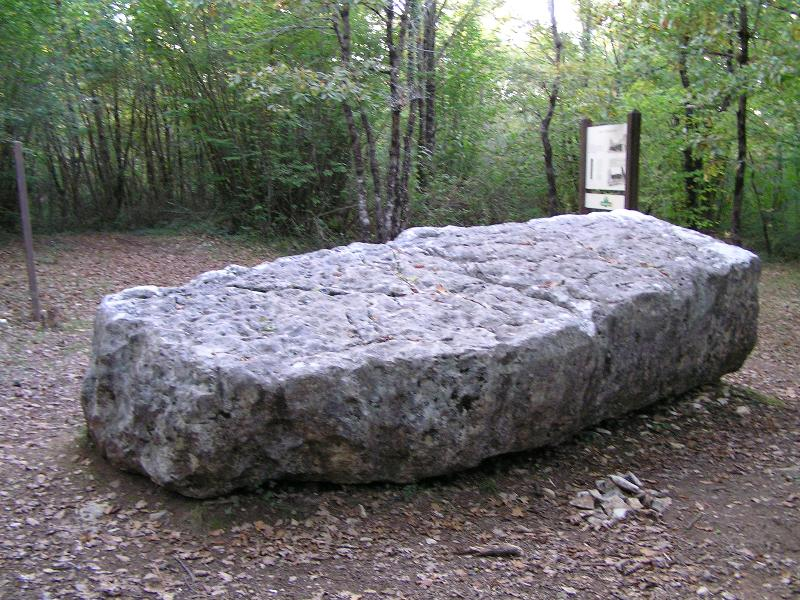
Fragment of a table from dolmen A in the Boixe forest, improperly known as the "Sacrifice Stone"

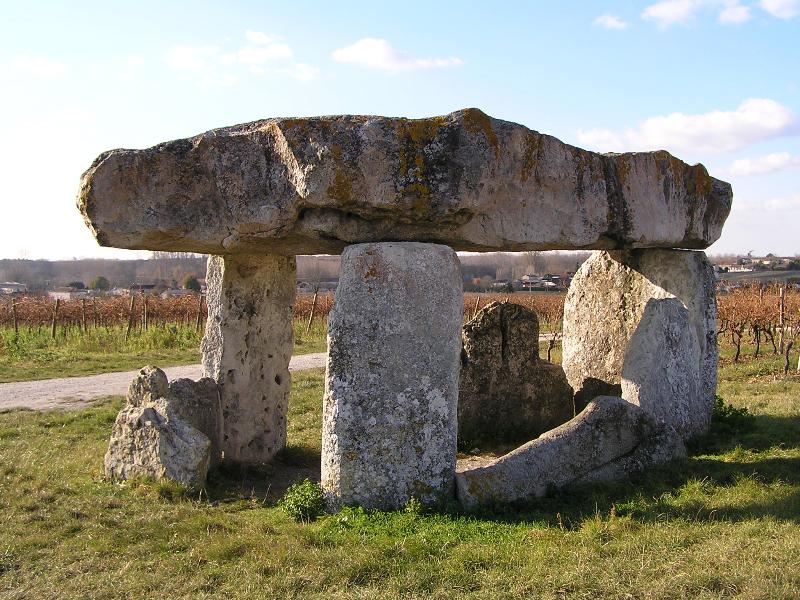
Dolmen at Saint-Fort-sur-le-Né

=== Bronze Age ===
The Bronze Age is characterized by the discovery of bronze objects in different locations. Axes were found at Montdouzil, near Châteauneuf, Montignac, Chazelles, and Rancogne. A significant discovery was the Vénat deposit at Saint-Yrieix, which contained swords, daggers, spears, jewelry, and toiletry items. Additionally, the Duffaits funeral cave at La Rochette, the Quéroy cave at Chazelles, and the Perrats cave at Agris have provided valuable insights into long-distance trade in Europe, including the presence of Baltic amber.

=== Iron Age ===
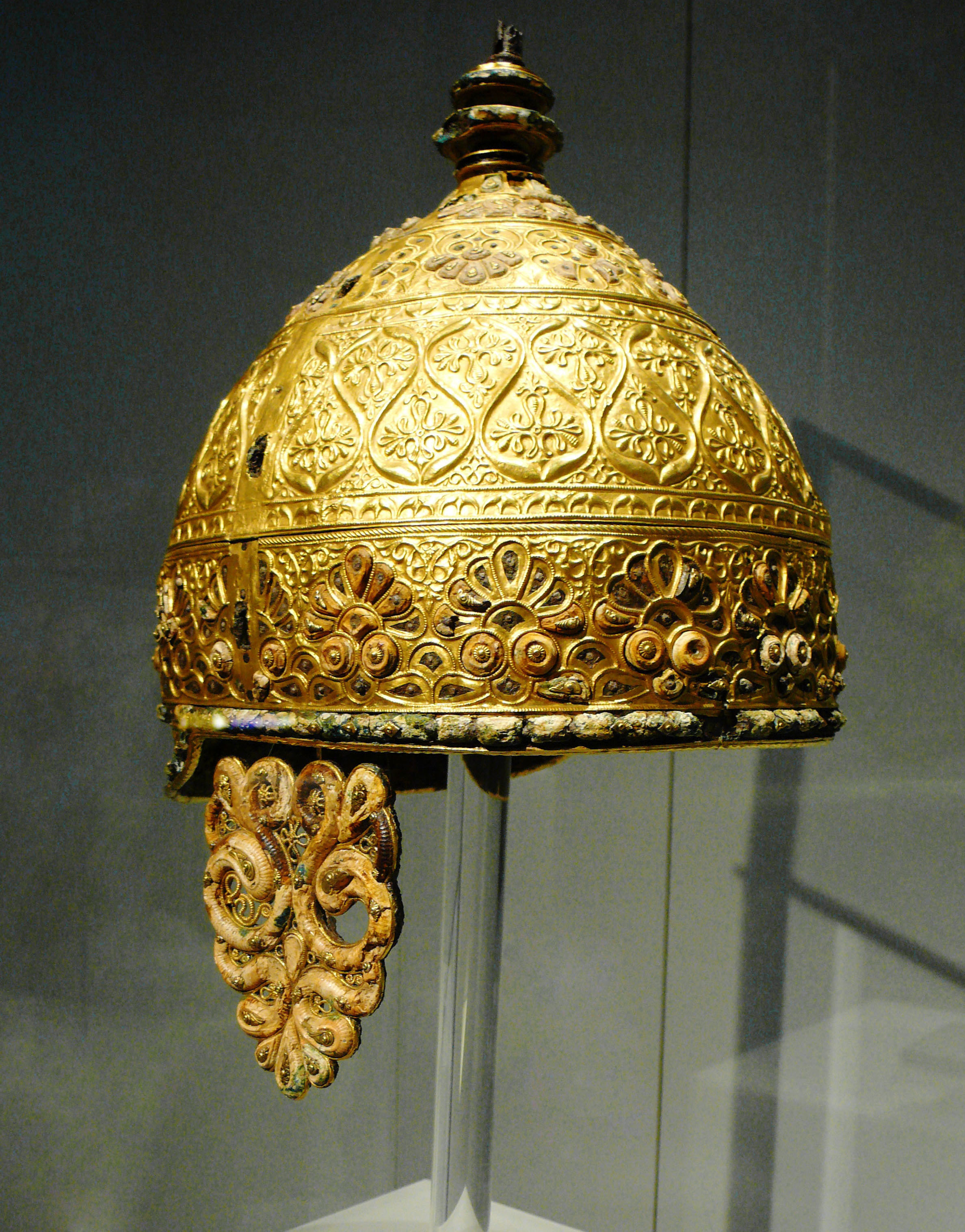
The Agris ceremonial helmet, Angoulême Museum

During the second Iron Age, the Santones inhabited the regions of Charente saintongeaise and Charente-Maritime. Angoumois was populated by an unidentified group, potentially under the influence of the neighboring Petrocorii or Lemovices. The Santones engaged in trade, particularly in salt from coastal areas that are now located inland; their main settlement was the oppidum of Pons.

Iculisma or Ecolisma (modern Angoulême) was the oppidum of the ancient people of Angoumois. Coins found in Angoumois were mostly Lemovice. Excavations, particularly of the southern rampart, have uncovered evidence of occupation dating back to the 7th century BC. The plateau has been inhabited continuously up to the present day.

Notable discoveries in the region include jewelry found in a late 6th-century BC grave at Les Planes in Saint-Yrieix, which included a torc, bracelet, ankle chains, and fibula. Another significant find is the Agris helmet, dating from the second quarter of the 4th century BC, near La Rochefoucauld. It is covered in gold and inlaid with coral, making it one of the most remarkable works of Celtic art at the Angoulême Museum.

The Perrats cave at Agris revealed ceramics and numerous other objects, as well as steles. Additionally, steles in the form of pointed obelisks were discovered at L'Isle-d'Espagnac and Roullet-Saint-Estèphe.

== From Roman Annexation to the Renaissance ==
=== Gallo-Roman Era ===
During the period of Gallic independence, the central Charente territory around Iculisma (Angoulême) was not associated with any larger group. While the Santones inhabited the west, the Lemovices and Petrocorii occupied the east, and the Pictones resided in the north, the status of the Iculisma territory was likely autonomous. The people of this region were probably clients of a neighboring group, possibly the Petrocorii or Lemovices. It was previously believed that they might be the Agesinates mentioned by Pliny the Elder in Natural History, but recent interpretations locate the Agesinates further south, near the Garonne. Consequently, the name of this Celtic tribe in Angoumois remains unknown, and their relationship with neighboring peoples is uncertain. To address this ambiguity, some contemporary scholars refer to this ancient group as the Écolismians, derived from Iculisma, the original name of Angoulême and the presumed capital of this unidentified tribe.

In 60 BC, the Helvetii, facing a Germanic invasion, intended to migrate to Saintonge, possibly with the approval of the Santones. Realizing the potential danger of this migration and the Santones' growing power, Caesar decided to invade and incorporate them in 58 BC without facing any opposition. During the rebellion in 52 BC, they heeded Vercingetorix's call to arms, with Caesar estimating their numbers at 30,000, but they arrived too late to make a significant impact.

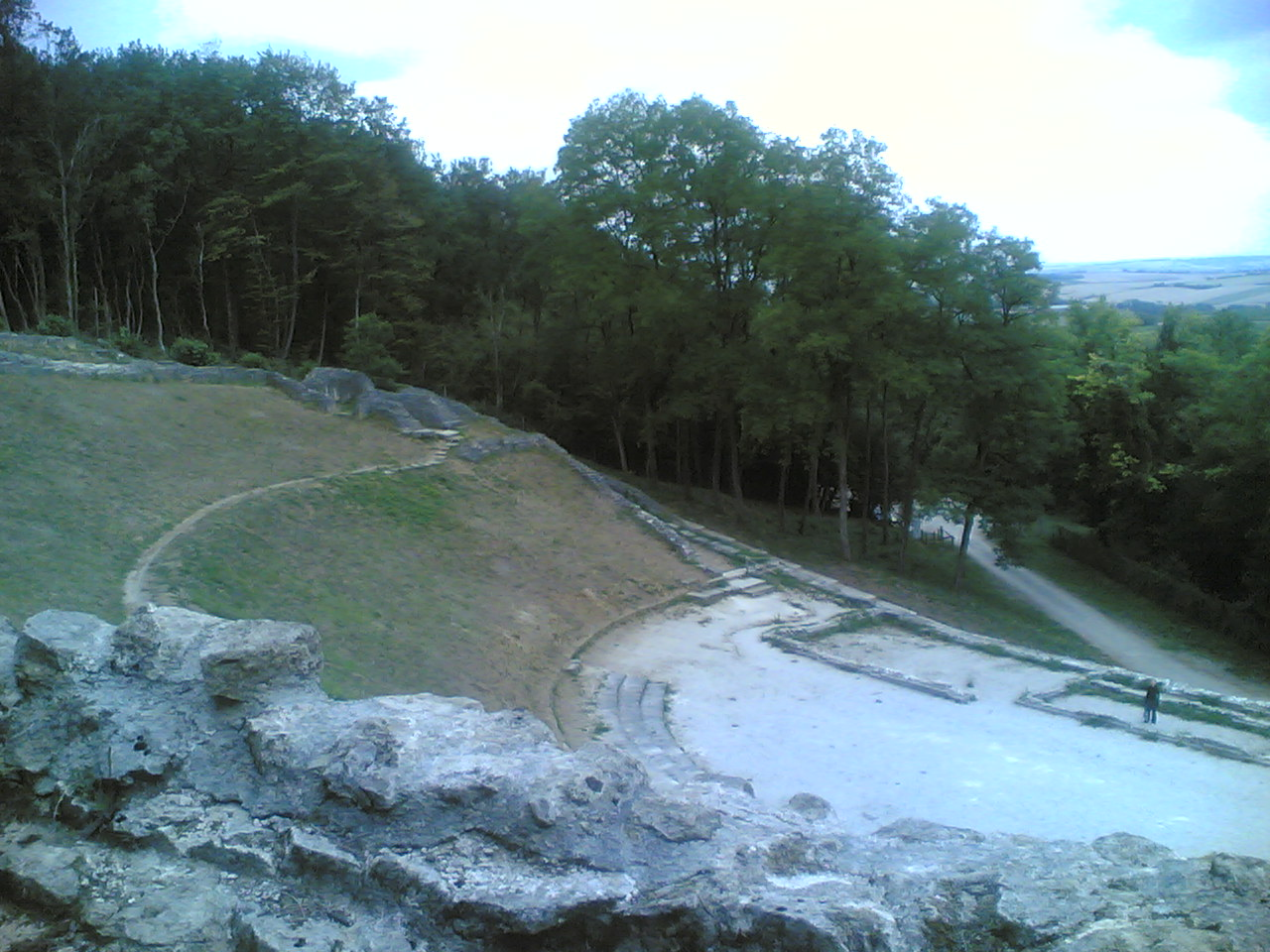
Gallo-Roman theater at Les Bouchauds.

The Romanized Charente region is intersected by the "Chemin chaussé" or "Roman Road" (Agrippa Road Lyon-Saintes) and the "Boisné Road" Périgueux-Saintes, which trace pre-Roman paths to Rome. Major north–south routes include Périgueux-Poitiers via Chassenon and Quéroy, Montignac, Mansle, Rom (known as the Chaussade), and, as indicated in the Peutinger Table, Chassenon-Mansle-Aulnay. These roads and the navigable river connecting the sea to Angoulême facilitated significant trade.

Angoumois was established as an autonomous territory (civitas) during the Late Roman Empire, with its boundaries corresponding to the first diocese of Angoulême. Numerous villas were constructed, primarily along the Charente Valley, along with settlements for retired legionaries. Significant constructions included monuments such as the temple, baths, and theater in the vicus of Chassenon, as well as the Bouchauds theater and the vicus of La Terne in Luxé.

The Christianization of Charente began in the 3rd century under Bishop Ausonius from Saintes, but it was delayed in Angoumois. The first bishop to be officially recognized was Dynamius, who was lauded by Gregory of Tours for his exemplary conduct during the Vandal siege of Angoulême in 406. This tumultuous period was marked by successive invasions, with the Visigoths, who were Christian but Arians and heavily Romanized, establishing themselves in 418 before being expelled by the Franks. The original Angoulême Cathedral was destroyed in 508 during Clovis' siege of the city.

The limited presence of Visigoths and their strong assimilation into the Gallo-Roman culture of Aquitaine resulted in few remnants of their influence in Charente. However, some indications of their presence can be found in place names such as Gourville (Gothorum villa) and a handful of unique artifacts like ornamental fibulae.

=== Early Middle Ages ===
Clovis established a count in Angoulême, likely the first counts being Maracaire and Nantinus, along with a Frankish Catholic bishop. He replaced the Arian bishop with his chaplain, Aptone, and rebuilt the church, which became the first Saint-Pierre church and the episcopal see. Following Clovis's death, his vast domains were divided among his four sons, with Angoumois going to Childebert, the King of Paris. This era saw a period of peace with limited Frankish settlement, mainly in Bouteville, Sonneville, Ambleville, Herpes, and Gensac-la-Pallue, where archaeological discoveries such as necropolises, swords, and belt buckles have been made. Despite this, the Aquitanians remained the predominant population, still heavily influenced by Gallo-Roman culture. The land was divided into large estates worked by slaves (Saint Cybard purchased 175 slaves in 558) and smaller to medium-sized properties. Charente was divided into numerous fiefs; the most significant of which were Cognac, Jarnac, and Angoulême. In 565, a Waddon is mentioned as the Count of Saintonge. Maraquier (or Maracaire) and Nantin (or Nantinus) are also documented as Counts of Angoulême during the 6th century.

During the 5th and 6th centuries, Christianization continued with hermits such as Saint Cybard, Saint Amant, Saint Fraigne, and Saint Groux. Angoulême had five places of worship within its walls and an equal number in the suburbs. The Saint-Cybard Abbey was established before conventual rules were in place, and the Saint-Amant-de-Boixe Abbey from the late 10th century.

As Charente became part of the second Aquitaine, the Moors invaded but were repelled by Charles Martel in 732. Pepin the Short initiated the reconquest of Aquitaine, which had become too independent. In 766, based in Bourges, he devastated Aquitaine up to Agen, particularly Angoumois and Périgord. At Saintes in 768, he granted the Aquitanians the benefits of Roman law. In 769, Charlemagne assembled an army and stayed at Mornac and Angeac, before defeating the last rebels led by Duke Waifer. Charlemagne advanced to the Dordogne, where he captured the remaining rebels and constructed the fortress of Franciacum (Fronsac) on the edge of the Wascon territory, which remained unconquered.

Under Charlemagne and then his son Louis the Pious, appointed as the ruler of the Kingdom of Aquitaine in 781, the region enjoyed a peace period until 838.

After 838, the situation became uncertain once again. Around 850, the Vikings sailed up Charente, destroying Saintes and Angoulême without any reaction from the Carolingians. The Aquitanian nobles then organized themselves and established the Duchy of Aquitaine, which later came under the rule of the Counts of Poitiers. The only non-hereditary counts of Angoulême identified from this period were Turpio (839–863) and his brother Emenon (863–866). In 866, Vulgrin founded the Taillefer dynasty, which lasted until 1200. In the early 11th century, the province was plagued by pestilence, vendettas, and private wars, but thanks to the Truce of God, peace was maintained from Wednesday evening to Monday, as well as during Advent and Lent. It was during this time that the castles held by the Counts of Angoulême, such as those in Marcillac, Rancogne, Angoulême, Montignac, Merpins, Villejoubert (the Andone dastrum), Villebois, Bouteville, and Archiac, were built. Other important castles in the region, not under the control of the Counts of Angoulême, included Confolens, Chabanais, Montbron, Ruffec, Jarnac, and Cognac.

=== High Middle Ages ===
Charente was adorned with several religious buildings. Each village had a Romanesque church, with the majority of these structures dating back to the 12th century.

The Count of Angoulême had control over the abbeys of Saint-Cybard in Angoulême and Saint-Amant-de-Boixe. The number of castles increased significantly, with twenty recorded in 1050 (including Merpins, Cognac, Jarnac, Ruffec, Barbezieux, and La Rochefoucauld) and twelve more by 1100 (such as Richemont, Châteauneuf, and Villebois). These initially consisted of motte-and-bailey structures, which were later replaced by stone keeps and castles in the 12th century. The Count directly controlled seven castles, while others were held by his vassals, including Jarnac, Cognac, and La Rochefoucauld. In the early 12th century, conflicts arose when the Duke of Aquitaine attempted to reclaim Saintonge and Angoumois.

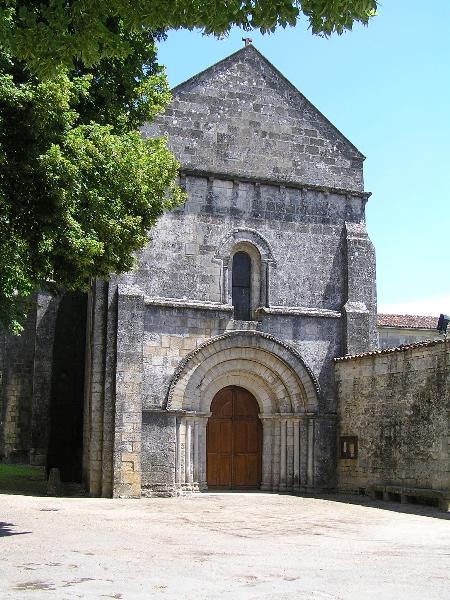
Saint-Vivien in Cherves

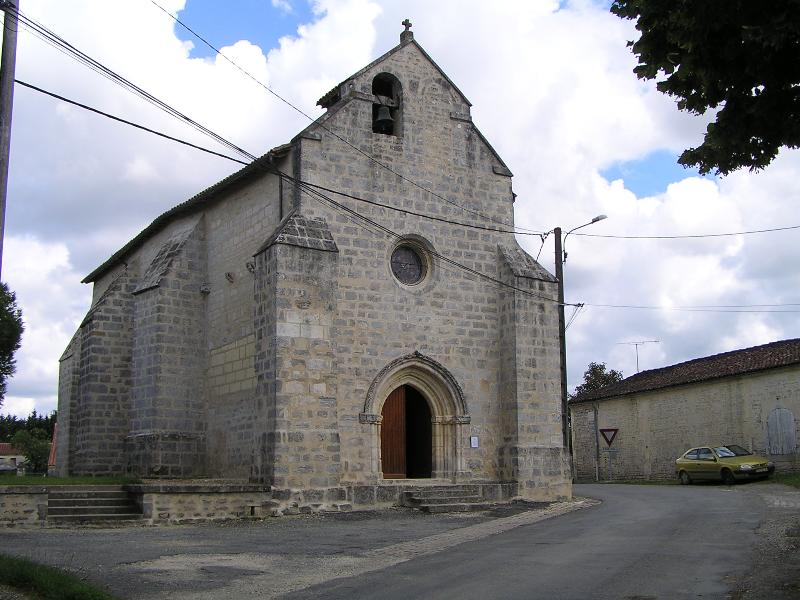
Saint-Pierre in Mesnac

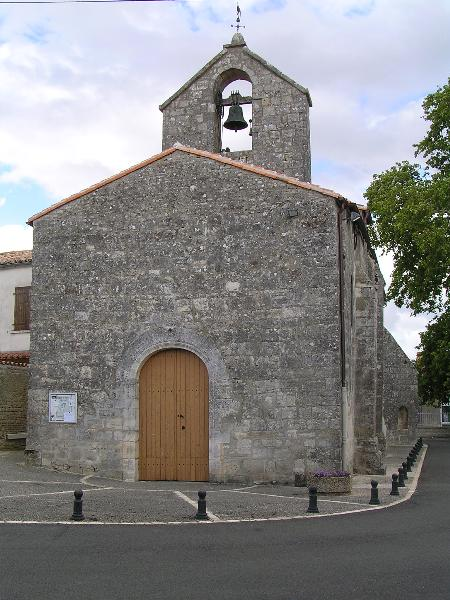
Saint-Martin in Houlette

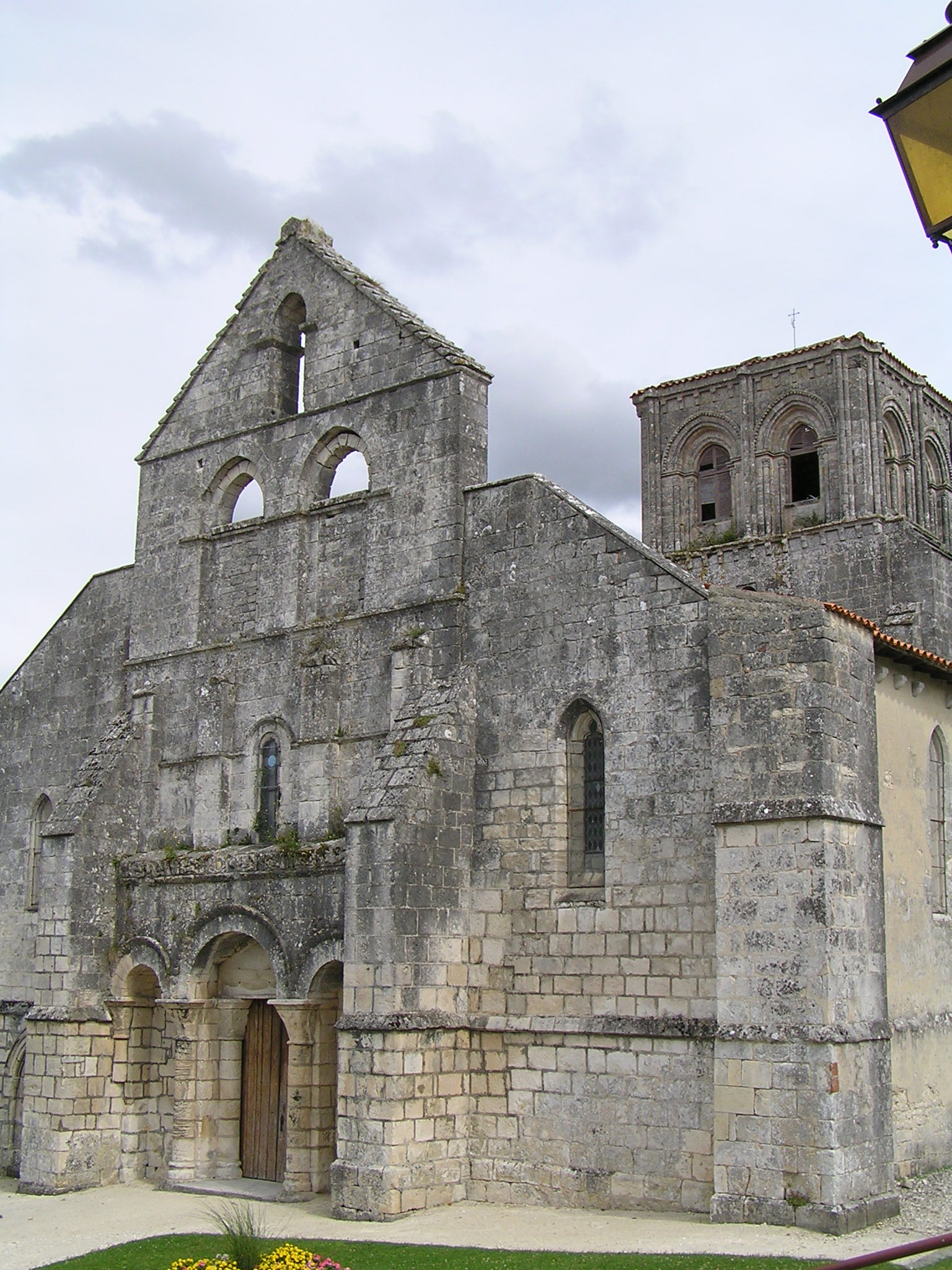
Saint-Médard in Genté

==== Charente in the Plantagenet Empire ====
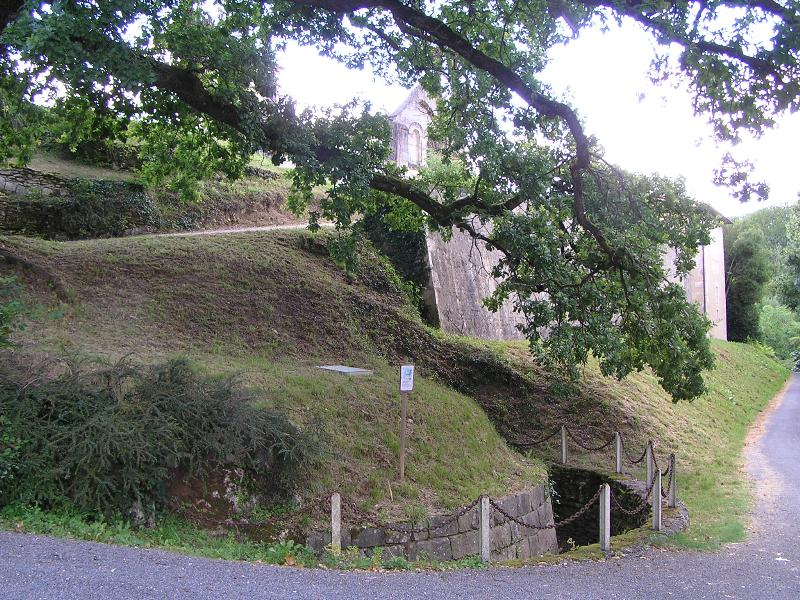
Ruins of the Château de Richemont tower razed to the ground by Richard the Lionheart.

The Duchy of Aquitaine was inherited by Eleanor of Aquitaine, who married King Louis VII of France in 1137 and later remarried Henry Plantagenet, who became Henry II of England in 1152. This brought Aquitaine, including Charente, under the control of the Plantagenet Empire. Henry II's policies led to revolts, and he eventually entrusted the duchy to his son Richard the Lionheart, who rebelled against his father. Eleanor was imprisoned, and her sons were defeated in the conflicts. In 1181, Henry II confiscated the County of Angoulême upon the death of Vulgrin III. After Richard the Lionheart's death in 1199, his brother John Lackland, who had married Isabelle, the last heiress of the Counts of Angoulême, succeeded him. When John Lackland refused to appear before Philip Augustus, who was called upon by Hugh IX of Lusignan, Isabelle's betrothed, Philip Augustus confiscated John Lackland's lands.

The Right Bank of Charente was recaptured from John Lackland between 1204 and 1210, resulting in devastation in the Charente region. A significant number of castles were burned, and several, including Richemont, Fontjoyeuse, and Boisroche, were destroyed or not rebuilt in their original locations. This destruction was reportedly carried out by Richard, the Lionheart. Following John Lackland's death in 1216, Isabelle married her first fiancé, Hugh X of Lusignan. After her father, Count Aymar, died in 1217, Isabelle inherited the county of Angoulême as the last representative of the Taillefer family. In 1241, King Louis IX granted his brother Alphonse the counties of Poitiers and Auvergne, and the conflicts persisted until the peace treaty was signed in 1258. When the last Lusignan died in 1308, King Philip IV the Fair placed his properties under sequestration.

In 1317, Joan of France, the daughter of Louis X the Quarreler, was granted the county of Angoulême as compensation for being excluded from the succession to the French throne. She managed the county until she died in 1349. However, her son did not inherit the county as the king traded it for other territories.

==== The Hundred Years' War ====
1365: France after the Treaties of Brétigny and Guérande. Territories controlled by Edward III Territories ceded by France to England under the Treaty of Brétigny. Territory of the Duchy of Brittany, allied with the English

The Hundred Years' War between the kings of France and England began in 1337. The first phase ended in 1360 with the Treaty of Brétigny, which returned all of Saintonge and Angoumois to the English. Edward the Black Prince frequently resided in Angoulême, Bouteville, and Cognac, surrounded by a splendid court. Angoumois enjoyed a few years of peace until issues arose from an extraordinary tax called the hearth tax, which was approved in 1363 and renewed in 1367. The French initiated the reconquest in 1369. In 1372, Angoulême welcomed the royal army, and Charles V granted it a communal charter in 1373, establishing a mayor and twelve aldermen, similar to the one Cognac had obtained during the time of John Lackland and renewed by Charles de La Cerda, Count of Angoulême, in 1352. Cognac was recaptured in 1375, and the river later served as a border. Many churches were fortified during this period.

After a brief truce, the Charente castles were gradually retaken: Archiac and Bourg-Charente in 1385, Merpins and Châteauneuf in 1386, and Jarnac in 1387. Some of these castles changed hands multiple times, creating a complex patchwork of fiefs controlled by either side or their allies. In 1416, the stronghold of La Roche-Chandry was recaptured from the English and destroyed; in 1417, Barbezieux met a similar fate, and in 1445, Bouteville was taken. The war in Charente finally came to an end in 1453 with the capture of Chalais, marking the conclusion of the English Aquitaine (Battle of Castillon).

Angoulême suffered a significant population decline, losing half of its residents, particularly during the Black Death from 1400 to 1407. This led to deserted villages, abandoned lands, diminished commerce, disappearing fairs, and ruined mills. To encourage agricultural activity, the lords provided favorable conditions for tenants willing to work the land.

In 1445, Count John, who had been a hostage in England since 1412, returned to find the Cognac castle abandoned and in disrepair. He began its reconstruction in 1450, restoring his county and ensuring its prosperity. He passed the county on to his son Charles de Valois in 1467. Together with his wife Louise of Savoy, they transformed Cognac into an intellectual and artistic hub.

== Modern times ==
=== From Francis I to the Wars of Religion ===
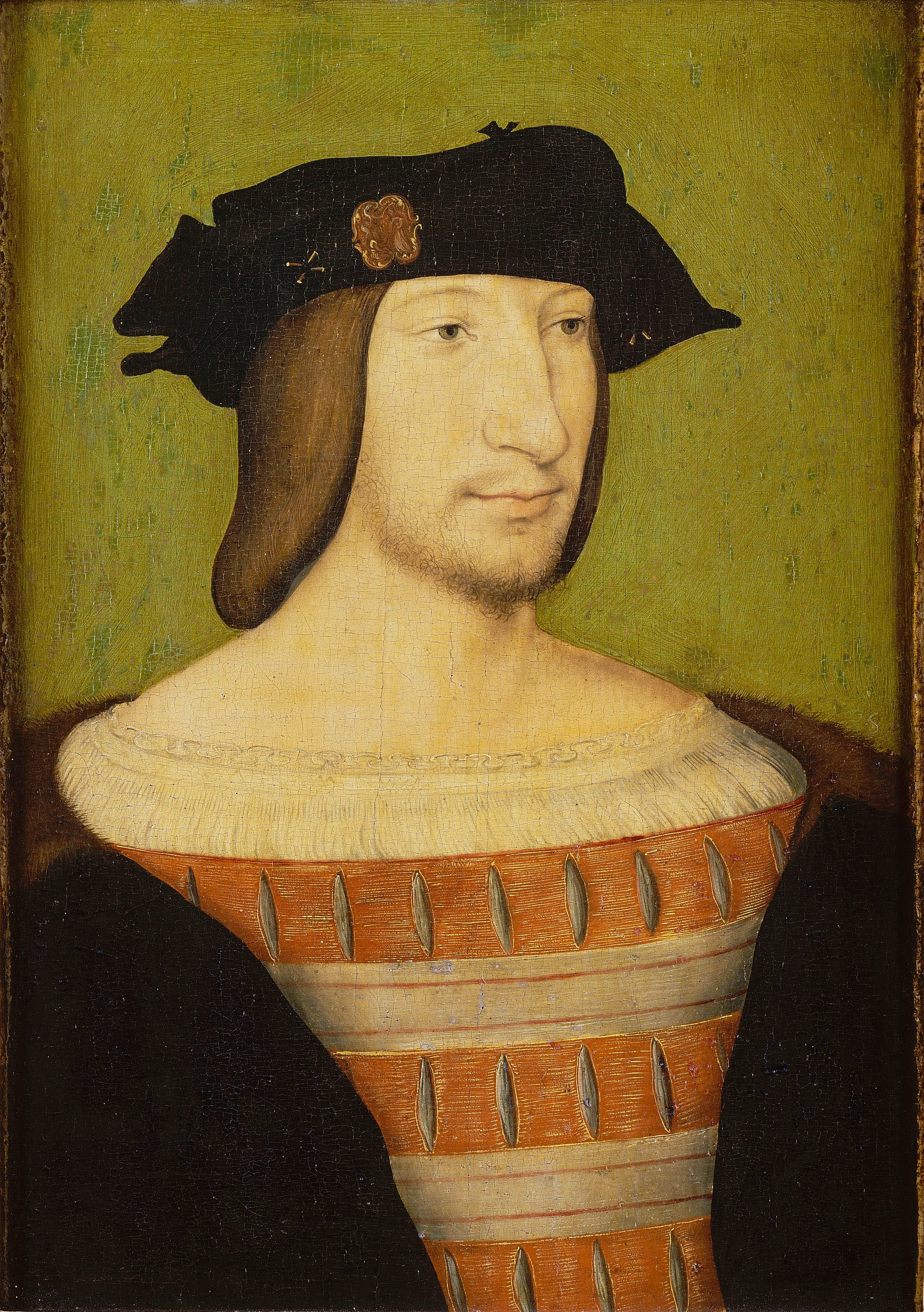
Francis I

Francis I, the son of the Count of Angoulême, was born on September 12, 1494, in Cognac. He spent his early childhood in a court led by his mother, Louise of Savoy. After his coronation in 1515, Francis continued to show interest in his beloved Charente. He completed the drainage of the marshland north of Cognac and, around 1517, added a long facade facing the quays to Cognac Castle. His sister, Marguerite of Orléans, also known as Marguerite of Angoulême, who was the mother of Jeanne d'Albret and the grandmother of the future king Henry IV, had close ties to the Protestants. Due to this connection, Francis did not persecute them at the beginning of the Reformation. In February 1514, he elevated the county of Angoulême to a duchy-peerage, combining it with the lands and lordships of Jarnac, Châteauneuf, Montignac, and Bassac. He then granted it to his mother, Louise of Savoy, who managed it until her death on September 22, 1531.

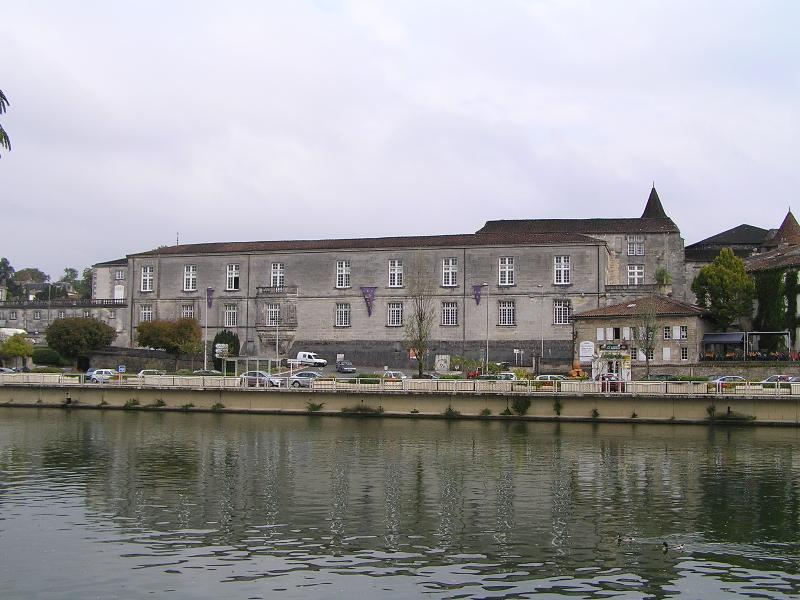
Château de Cognac facade.

Upon the death of Louise of Savoy, the duchy of Angoulême was reunited with the crown until 1540. It was then granted as an appanage to Charles of France, the sovereign's third son. The period was marked by revolts against the gabelle tax starting in 1542.

After the Edict of Compiègne in 1557, which condemned heretics to death, the Wars of Religion began in Charente in 1562 with various massacres of Protestants, notably in retaliation for the sacking they had perpetrated. During the first War of Religion, Cognac city took up arms; it was retaken in 1563 by Montpensier. In 1565, Charles IX visited during his royal tour of France (1564–1566). In 1570, the Peace of Saint-Germain-en-Laye, signed between King Charles IX and Admiral Gaspard de Coligny, granted the Protestants four strongholds, including Cognac.

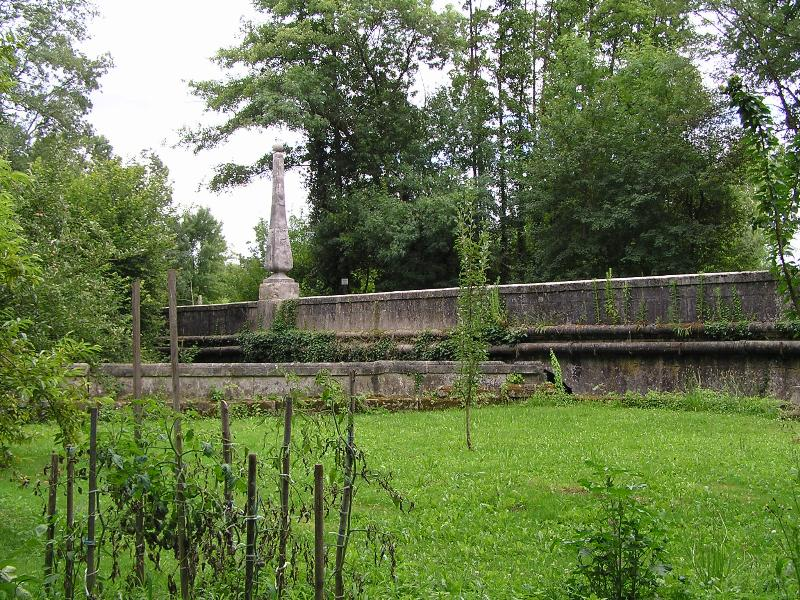
Obelisk on the Saint-Sulpice bridge

In 1567, the fifth Protestant synod took place in Verteuil-sur-Charente, following similar events in Paris and Lyon.

A significant event in Charente was the Battle of Jarnac on March 13, 1569, resulting in the death of Condé. Some troops regrouped on the bridge of Saint-Sulpice, which is now commemorated by an obelisk, before moving to La Rochelle. The Edict of Nantes, signed by Henry IV on April 13, 1598, granted Protestants the freedom to worship. As a result, temples and communities were established in all the towns of Charente, located outside the walls.

=== Charente during absolutism (17th - 18th centuries) ===
During this period, the cathedral and hundreds of ruined churches needed repair or rebuilding. Additionally, convents such as the Capuchins, Recollects, Minims, Jesuits, Carmelites, Franciscans, Ursulines, Poor Clares, and Benedictines multiplied and settled throughout the department. In the early 17th century, croquant rebellions were prevalent. The Augier house, one of the pioneering cognac trading houses, was founded in 1643. During the Fronde, despite Louis XIV, Anne of Austria, and Mazarin visiting Angoulême in 1650 to secure its allegiance, Condé rebelled, and La Rochefoucauld laid siege to Cognac.

From 1620 onwards, the right to Protestant worship was fiercely contested, leading to the destruction of temples and the deprivation of freedom of worship for Reformed worshipers whose lord had abandoned the faith. The dragonnades, which followed the revocation of the Edict of Nantes by the Edict of Fontainebleau in 1685, coerced Protestants to either convert or emigrate, with many choosing to relocate to Germany, Switzerland, the New World, Canada, and particularly the West Indies. It took the Charente economy over a hundred years to recover from the departure of nearly half of its artisans.

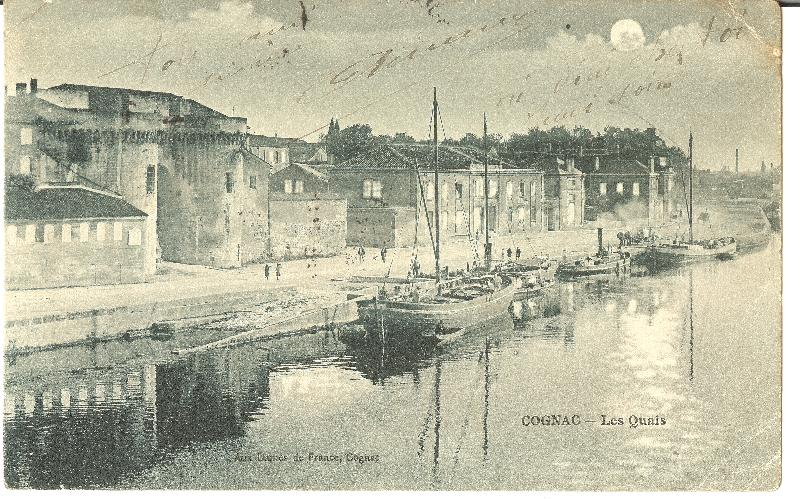
Gabares in the port of Cognac.

During a period of relative peace, the region faced challenges in recovering from sackings, massacres, and the departure of Protestants. The Charente region was predominantly agricultural, focusing on the production of cereals, with lesser importance placed on hemp, truffles, saffron, and pastures. The Cognac region emerged as a significant producer of distilled wine for export around 1630. Despite setbacks such as the frost of 1709, which required replanting, production, and the area of vineyards (156,000 hectares in 1780) continued to grow.

The years leading up to the Revolution were characterized by a series of poor harvests due to a drought in 1785, floods in 1786, and hail on July 13, 1788.

== The Revolutionary Period ==
=== The Revolution: 1789-1799 ===
Map of Charente (1790).

Local grievance books presented general demands such as the unification of regulations, voting on taxes, and several specific requests, including the separation of Angoulême from Limousin. Parishioners from Angoumois took a keen interest in drafting the grievance books, with between 40% and 50% of household heads participating. The bourgeoisie influence was significant, with 90% of the presidents of parish assemblies and 80% of the deputies to the bailiwick assemblies being bourgeois. This influence was evident in the politicization of the Angoumois grievance books, which were among the most advanced in the center-west of the kingdom. Equality before taxes was demanded in 88% of them, a third requested the regular convening of an assembly, and one in four wanted deputies to vote individually rather than by order. However, the seigneurial regime was less criticized in Charente than in Poitou. Finally, divisions within the clergy emerged, as the Bishop of Angoulême was elected deputy by a narrow margin, with parish priests not following voting instructions and casting their votes for members of the lower clergy.

After the storming of the Bastille, the region was impacted by the Great Fear of the summer of 1789. In Charente, it began in Ruffec and quickly spread in all directions, reaching Saintes within two days. This period allowed for some anti-seigneurial actions and led to the formation of numerous national guards.

In 1790, the department of Charente was established, consisting of six districts (Angoulême, Barbezieux, Confolens, Cognac, La Rochefoucauld, Ruffec) and forty-four cantons. Barbezieux sought to merge with Saintonge, while Cognac requested a court of equal status to Angoulême to gain independence.

In 1791, the Jacobin Club was established, with 18 patriotic societies in Charente promoting new ideals. The Civil Constitution of the Clergy found acceptance in the countryside, with 60% of Charentais clergy taking the oath, rising to over 80% in the northern part of the department. However, it faced rejection in towns influenced by the Bishop of Angoulême.

Church properties were sold in large lots, while national properties confiscated from emigrants were sold in numerous small lots, often purchased by bourgeois and wealthy peasants. Additionally, monuments were sold off as quarries, such as the Jarnac castle and the Abbey of Notre-Dame de La Couronne. From 1791 to 1793, six districts (Ruffec, Confolens, La Rochefoucauld, Angoulême, Barbezieux, and Cognac) in Charente department contributed 10 battalions of national volunteers and 3 companies.

The volunteer levies initially consisted of two battalions, with one battalion earning distinction at Jemappes and the other during the Italian campaign. From 1791 to 1793, 45,000 Charentais were enlisted. The department showed enthusiasm by providing 4,000 men out of the 900 requested in 1792 and an additional 5,566 men out of the 4,640 requested the following year during the mass levy. However, support for the Revolution was not unanimous, as riots broke out in the Confolens region.

The Reign of Terror was relatively moderate, resulting in only sixty-eight death sentences, with forty-nine issued by the Paris tribunal. These sentences were primarily based on denunciations by revolutionary committees, notably the one led by La Rochefoucauld. Deputy Harmand, the representative on a mission, maintained a moderate approach in dealing with counter-revolutionaries but spearheaded a vigorous dechristianization campaign. During this period, nearly 200 priests renounced their priesthood within two months.

=== The Consulate (1799-1804) and the First Empire (1804-1814) ===
The Consulate facilitated pacification after a tumultuous decade. Angoulême's administrative authority was enhanced with the appointment of a prefect, and the Diocese of Angoulême encompassed Charente and Dordogne. All other officials, such as subprefects, were from Charente and mostly already in their positions.

In 1799, all churches were reopened for worship, and Protestant worship was officially permitted in Jarnac, serving as the ecclesiastical headquarters for the four districts with 3,260 declared Protestants. During the First Empire, conscription imposed a significant burden, leading to an increase in the number of draft evaders and deserters, although it remained around the national average of approximately 20%. In the Confolens region, known for its bocage landscape, resistance to conscription was more pronounced compared to the rest of the department, with 423 draft evaders and 42 deserters in 1811.

== Contemporary Period ==
=== The 19th Century and the Industrial Revolution ===
During this period, Charente showed hesitancy or indifference towards national political events, despite the steady progress of liberal opinions. The royalist Viscount Delalot, defeated in the general elections of 1824, was elected by the Charente department college to the Chamber of Deputies on November 24, 1827. In the elections of April 1848, Charente elected four republican deputies and five right-wing candidates. In the December 1848 elections, with 111,338 registered voters and 95,027 votes cast, Louis-Napoléon Bonaparte received 90,360 votes, Cavaignac received 3,168 votes, and Ledru-Rollin received 1,011 votes. Alfred de Vigny, residing in Maine-Giraud, described Charente as "nothing but a Bonapartist Vendée." In 1877, six Bonapartist deputies were elected, with the seventh being Auguste Duclaud, a republican in Confolens. A by-election in 1888 led to violent confrontations when Paul Déroulède ran, initially defeated but later elected in the general elections in 1889.

In the early 19th century, as metallurgy advanced, the paper industry in Angoulême stagnated, and the cognac trade declined by half. Angoulême, an industrial town known for its foundry, numerous paper mills, and various manufacturing industries, including the renowned charentaises felt slippers, saw steady growth without any significant events.

Viticulture has been the principal economic activity in the Cognac region since the 17th century, resulting in the accumulation of considerable wealth. This is evident in the numerous chateaus and manors built or renovated during this period, thanks to the 1860 trade treaty. The vineyard area expanded from 50,000 hectares in 1817 to 116,000 hectares in 1876. The crisis caused by the appearance of phylloxera, which destroyed grapevines from 1875 onwards, resulted in ruin and rural exodus. American plants, resistant to the disease, helped reconstitute the vineyard twenty years later. During this period, the development of livestock farming in Charente-Limousin was focused on the meat and milk production. This was achieved through the establishment of cooperative and private dairies across the department.

A dense railway network was established in Angoulême with the construction of the Paris-Bordeaux line by the Orleans railway company in 1852. The Angoulême-Cognac-Saintes line was also built by the Charentes Railway Company in 1867, with six of the eighteen largest shareholders being local spirits trading companies. Additionally, the small lines of the CFD (Chemins de Fer Départementaux, humorously referred to as "Compagnie Foutue D'avance") were part of the railway network.

After reaching a peak of over 50,000 tons per year at the port of l'Houmeau in Angoulême, traffic and navigation on the Charente River started to decrease.

In 1881, when the school laws were promulgated, there were 854 schools in Charente. Over the subsequent 20 years, 300 new schools were constructed. Two teacher training colleges were also established in 1884 for female teachers and in 1885 for male teachers. The Charente region had five communal colleges at the time, including Angoulême, which became a royal college in 1840 and a lycée in 1848.

=== 20th Century ===
==== World War I ====
During World War I, with the mobilization of all young men, women and older men took over all jobs in farms and factories in Angoulême that were converted for the war effort. The national powder factory and the Ruelle Foundry each employed 10,000 workers. In 1917, the Mayoux couple, both teachers, published the inaugural pacifist brochure. They were subsequently tried for defeatism and dismissed from their teaching posts.

==== Interwar Period ====
The Charente countryside did not recover from the significant number of casualties sustained during the war, with the population dropping from 347,061 in 1911 to 309,279 in 1936.

Charente attempted to maintain political unity by organizing a "Republican Congress" in 1919, led by Édouard Martell and James Hennessy, to establish a "Republican and Agricultural Union" list for the legislative election on March 16, 1919. However, in 1924, Charente elected 3 out of 5 deputies to the conservative right "National Bloc" due to left-wing division. The Radical Socialist Party gained prominence in Charente during this time. The 1936 election campaign was marked by violence. However, the Popular Front emerged victorious with 4 out of 5 deputies, including 3 radicals and 1 USR (Socialist Republican Union) René Gounin, who later became a senator. In the April 1939 by-election, Marcel Déat was elected in the second round against a communist. Shortly after, Marcel Déat revealed his pro-Hitler neo-socialism through articles in the journal L'Œuvre.

==== World War II ====
Following the commencement of hostilities between Europe's major powers and France's declaration of war against Nazi Germany on September 3, 1939, followed by Germany's invasion of France, Belgium, Luxembourg, and the Netherlands on May 10, 1940, Charente became a refuge for thousands of displaced persons during the so-called Phoney War.

The department was divided by the demarcation line after the armistice on June 22, 1940, with the western part in the occupied zone and the eastern part in the free zone. The demarcation line ran approximately north–south a few kilometers east of Angoulême and had fourteen crossing points.

Resistance in Charente started with secret crossings and an initial act of sabotage on September 20, 1941, when two students tried to set fire to a depot at Angoulême station. In 1941, elected officials were dismissed and suspects arrested. In October 1942, the Jews of Angoulême were rounded up and deported.

In 1942 and 1943, maquis groups organized and united, mostly affiliated with the Bir Hacheim maquis (Armée secrète) and the FTP (Francs-Tireurs et Partisans). The Cognac air base was bombed on December 13, 1943. The FFI (French Forces of the Interior), with 2,936 members in 1944, increased their operations. Many convoys were immobilized due to sabotage, and the Angoulême station was bombed on June 15, 1944. Despite severe reprisals, German columns were halted or delayed. Angoulême and the rest of Charente were liberated by the end of August 1944. Cognac was liberated on September 1, with General de Gaulle visiting on September 13. Subsequently, 1,800 fighters moved to the southern part of the La Rochelle siege, where fighting continued until May 8, 1945.

Charente mourned a total of 3,565 victims, which included 249 individuals who were executed and 345 who died in deportation (with 377 other deportees eventually returning). Additionally, there were 910 victims in the partisan army, 156 victims of bombings, 1,835 military casualties, and 70 STO (Compulsory Work Service) conscripts (with 738 out of the 11,785 prisoners of war not returning).

==== Post-War Period ====
The aftermath of World War II was characterized by the influence of key figures such as Félix Gaillard, a deputy; Guy Pascaud, a senator; Pierre Marcilhacy, a senator; Jean Monnet, known as the "father of Europe;" and François Mitterrand.

The Angoulême region experienced a revival of its traditional industries, particularly castings, paper mills, brick factories, and slipper manufacturing (charentaises).

The Cognac region experienced significant prosperity starting in 1950, thanks to the resumption of free trade. The National Interprofessional Cognac Bureau (BNIC) was established in 1946. The entire sector, encompassing viticulture, trade, and packaging industries (glassmaking, cooperage, cardboard manufacturing, and the production of corks and labels), flourished during this period. In 1971, cognac houses started selling their products to global distributors, and by 1974, they were facing a crisis of overproduction.

=== Contemporary Period ===
The industry in the region continues to rely on extractive activities, including clay extraction for brick and tile manufacturing in the Roumazières-Loubert area (which accounts for one-sixth of French tile production). Additionally, gray marl is supplied to the Lafarge cement plant in La Couronne, gypsum is extracted in Cherves-Richemont for use by the Placoplatre plant, and there are also smaller operations for white clay, building stone, and aggregates.

While the foundry and paper industries have declined, the powder factory, now known as SNPE, continues to thrive. Leroy-Somer, a manufacturer of electric motors, also represents the electrical industry. The CNBDI (National Comic Book and Image Center) was established in 1990 and transformed into La Cité in 2008. Additionally, the Digital Imaging Department (DIN) evolved into the Digital Imaging Laboratory (LIN) in 1996, and the Image and Sound High School (LISA) was established, contributing to the growth of the animation industry sector.

The agri-food sector (IAA) has experienced a decline in dairy and meat processing industries, while livestock farming remains significant. The cognac trade has transformed as most cognac houses were acquired by global distributors, shifting decision-making away from the region. Despite these challenges, the cognac industry has adapted by expanding into other areas and focusing on exports (cooperage, glassmaking, cardboard, labels, and packaging).

Charente, with a population of 349,535 in 2007, has not experienced demographic growth for over 200 years. Rural areas, particularly Charente Limousine and Southern Charente, are experiencing depopulation. The cities of Angoulême and Cognac saw growth between 1954 and 1975, with the Angoulême metropolitan area now housing a third of the department's population. From 1950, the department faced 40 years of net migration balance as young adults left, leading to high unemployment of 9.8% by the end of 2009. However, the migration balance turned positive from 1999 onwards. The population of Charente is aging significantly, especially in rural areas, due to increased life expectancy and the return of retirees.

== See also ==
- Angoumois
- Charente (river)
- Charente
- Cognac
- National Volunteers (France)

== Bibliography ==
=== General literature ===
- Combes, Jean; Luc, Michel (1986). La Charente de la Préhistoire à nos jours (ouvrage collectif). L'histoire par les documents (in French). St-Jean-d'Y, Imprimerie Bordessoules. ISBN 2-903504-21-0. Archived from the original on August 28, 2015.
- Martin-Buchey, Jules (1996). Géographie historique et communale de la Charente (in French). Vol. 1: Arrondissement d'Angoulême. Éditions de la Tour Gile. ISBN 2-878022-6-88.
- Mouchet, Gaston (1893). La Charente Collection "La France par départements" (in French). Paris: Editions Picard et Kaan. Archived from the original on December 24, 2018.
- Vernou, Christian (1993). La Charente. Carte archéologique de la Gaule (in French). Paris: Maison des Sciences de l'Homme. ISBN 2-87754-025-1.

=== Angoulême and Angoumois ===
- Dubourg-Noves, Pierre (1990). Histoire d'Angoulême et de ses alentours. Univers de la France et des pays francophones (in French). Toulouse: Éditions Privat. ISBN 2-7089-8246-X. Archived from the original on December 19, 2015.
- Michon, Jean-Hippolyte; de La Pile, Vigier; de Corlieu, François (1976) [1846]. Histoire de l'Angoumois. Suivie du recueil en forme d'histoire de ce qui se trouve par écrit de la ville et des comtes d'Angoulême (in French). Paris: Laffitte. ISBN 2-86276-384-5. Archived from the original on September 18, 2021.
- Munier, Étienne (1780). L'Angoumois à la fin de l'Ancien Régime (in French).

=== Archaeology ===
- Charente (in French). Société française d'archéologie. 1995.

=== Cognac and Cognaçais ===
- Cousin, Abbé (1882). Histoire de Cognac, Jarnac, Segonzac et d'un grand nombre de localités (in French). Bordeaux: Imprimerie G. Gounouilhou. Archived from the original on May 9, 2023.
- Martin-Civat, Pierre (1980). Histoire de Cognac et des Cognaçais, des origines à nos jours (in French). Vol. I.
- Martin-Civat, Pierre (1992). Histoire de Cognac et des Cognaçais, des origines à nos jours (in French). Vol. II.
- Marvaud, François (1870). Étude historique sur la ville de Cognac (in French). Vol. 1. Niort: L. Clouzot. Archived from the original on May 21, 2023.
- Marvaud, François (1870). Étude historique sur la ville de Cognac (in French). Vol. 2. Niort: L. Clouzot. Archived from the original on May 21, 2023.

=== French Revolution ===
- Jézéquel, Jean (1992). La Charente révolutionnaire : 1789-1799 (in French). Société archéologique et historique de la Charente.

=== Economic and social history ===
- Bureau, Abbé Pierre (2003). Les émigrés charentais : 1791-1814 (in French). Afterword by Marie Dumont-Vergereau. PULIM. ISBN 2-84287-252-5.
- Baptiste, René (1995). Histoire de la CFDT en Charente (in French). Union départementale CFDT.
- La CGT en Charente (in French). Institut CGT d'histoire sociale. 1995.
- Debord, André (1984). La société laïque dans les pays de la Charente xe-xiie s. (in French). Picard. ISBN 2-7084-0112-2. Archived from the original on September 12, 2021.
- Le Diraison, Henry; Renaud, Yvette (1996). Chemins de fer de Charente : au temps de la vapeur (in French). CDDP de la Charente. ISBN 2-903770-40-9.
- Léger, Alain (2000). Les Indésirables : l'histoire oubliée des Espagnols en pays charentais (in French). Le Croît vif. ISBN 2-907967-57-6.
- Michon, Jean-Hippolyte (1844). Statistique monumentale de la Charente (in French). Preface by Bruno Sépulchre. Paris: Derache. Archived from the original on May 29, 2015.

=== World War II ===
- Association Résistance et Mémoire (2005). La Résistance en Charente (in French). SCEREN & La Documentation française. ISBN 2-915742-05-7.
- Baudet, Jacques; Marquis, Hugues (2014). La Charente dans la guerre 1939-1945 (in French). Sayat: De Borée. ISBN 978-2 812 907 388.
- Farisy, Jacques (2009). La ligne de démarcation dans le département de la Charente : 1940-1943 (in French). Geste éditions. ISBN 978-2-84561-573-1.
- Hontarrède, Guy (2004). La Charente dans la Seconde Guerre mondiale : dictionnaire historique (in French). Le Croît vif. ISBN 2-907967-78-9.
- Troussard, Raymond (1981). Le Maquis charentais Bir Hacheim (in French). SAJIC Angoulême.

=== External links ===
- "Site de la Société archéologique et historique de la Charente" (in French).
