= Moulins-sur-Tardoire =

- Commune
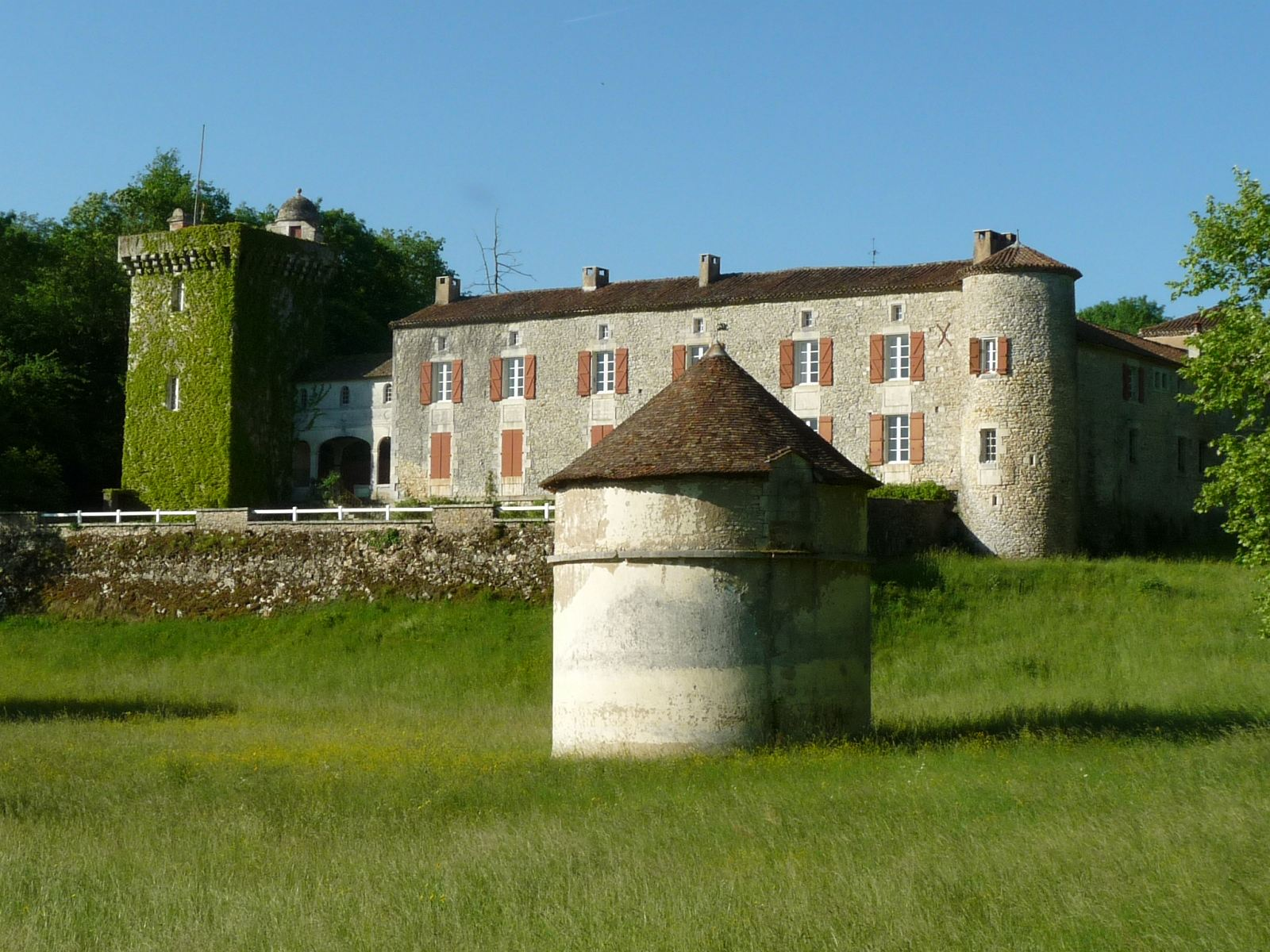
- The chateau in Rancogne
- Location of Moulins-sur-Tardoire
- Location within France Location within Nouvelle-Aquitaine
- Coordinates: 45°40′56″N 0°25′15″E
- Country: France
- Region: Nouvelle-Aquitaine
- Department: Charente
- Arrondissement: Angoulême
- Canton: Val de Tardoire
- Intercommunality: La Rochefoucauld - Porte du Périgord
- Area^{1}: 21.88 km^{2} (8.45 sq mi)
- Highest elevation: 138 m (453 ft)
- Lowest elevation: 81 m (266 ft)
- Population (2023): 821
  - Density: 37.5/km^{2} (97.2/sq mi)
- Time zone: UTC+01:00 (CET)
  - Summer (DST): UTC+02:00 (CEST)
- INSEE/Postal code: 16406 /16220
- ^{1} French Land Register data, which excludes lakes, ponds, glaciers > 1 km^{2} (0.386 sq mi or 247 acres) and river estuaries.

Moulins-sur-Tardoire is a commune in the department of Charente, southwestern France. It was established on 1 January 2019 by merger of the former communes of Vilhonneur (the seat) and Rancogne.

== See also ==
- Communes of the Charente department
