= Vilhonneur =

- Part of Moulins-sur-Tardoire
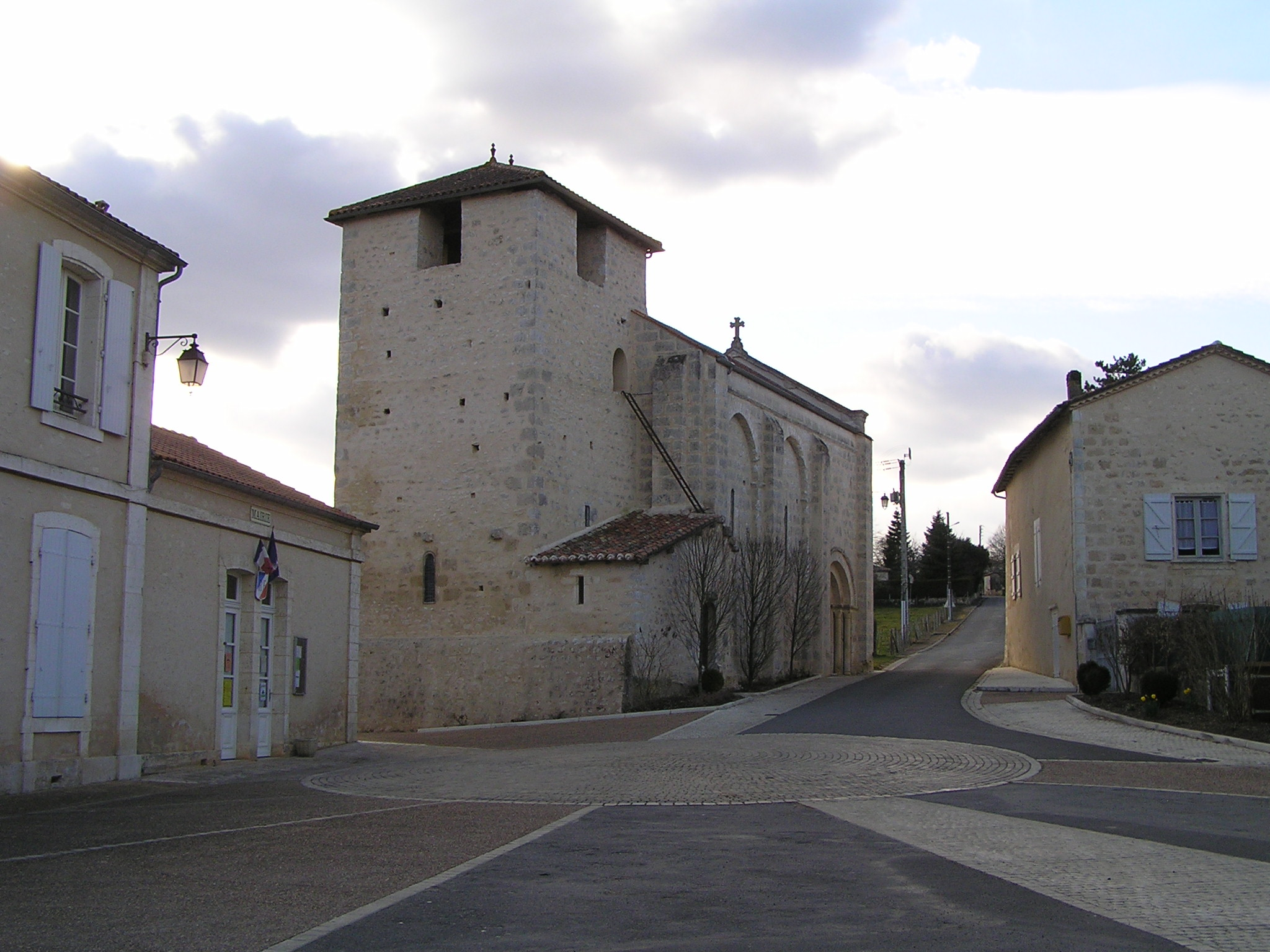
- Location of Vilhonneur
- Location within France Location within Nouvelle-Aquitaine
- Coordinates: 45°40′56″N 0°25′15″E
- Country: France
- Region: Nouvelle-Aquitaine
- Department: Charente
- Arrondissement: Angoulême
- Canton: Val de Tardoire
- Commune: Moulins-sur-Tardoire
- Area^{1}: 9.36 km^{2} (3.61 sq mi)
- Elevation: 90 m (300 ft)
- Highest elevation: 137 m (449 ft)
- Lowest elevation: 87 m (285 ft)
- Population (2019): 416
  - Density: 44.4/km^{2} (115/sq mi)
- Time zone: UTC+01:00 (CET)
  - Summer (DST): UTC+02:00 (CEST)
- Postal code: 16220
- ^{1} French Land Register data, which excludes lakes, ponds, glaciers > 1 km^{2} (0.386 sq mi or 247 acres) and river estuaries.

Vilhonneur (French pronunciation: [vilɔnœʁ]; Occitan: Vilonor) is a former commune in the Charente department in southwestern France. On 1 January 2019, it was merged into the new commune Moulins-sur-Tardoire.

== History ==
Vilhonneur was located on the Angoulême-Limoges Roman road, which was also known as the "English Road" (chemin des Anglais).

The Rochebertier tower is mentioned in a confession to Philip the Bold in 1276. A medieval castle, of which exist only traces of the foundations, is located on a hillock. The present castle was built by the Chambes (aka Jambes) family in the late sixteenth century.

== Population ==
Historical population

Year	Pop.	±% p.a.
1793	340	—
1821	436	+0.89%
1846	426	−0.09%
1872	432	+0.05%
1901	420	−0.10%
1926	364	−0.57%
1946	312	−0.77%

Year	Pop.	±% p.a.
1962	294	−0.37%
1968	286	−0.46%
1975	286	+0.00%
1982	319	+1.57%
1990	318	−0.04%
1999	276	−1.56%
2019	416	+2.07%

Source: EHESS and INSEE (2019)

== Sights ==
The town has two prehistoric caves of an exceptional nature.

The Placard cave, at Rochebertier, was discovered in 1853 and has been dated to the Magdalenian and Solutrean periods. New paintings were discovered in 1990, identical to those in the Pech Merle cave at Lot.

The "Face" cave (grotte du Visage) was discovered in November 2005 during a caving expedition. It contains engravings as well as human and animal bones dating from the Upper Paleolithic period (around 25 000 years BCE).

At the site of the old Roman ford there is still the 50 cm-wide stone bridge, which was characteristic of the Tardoire and Bandiat valleys.

== See also ==
- Communes of the Charente department
