= Plaizac =

- Part of Rouillac
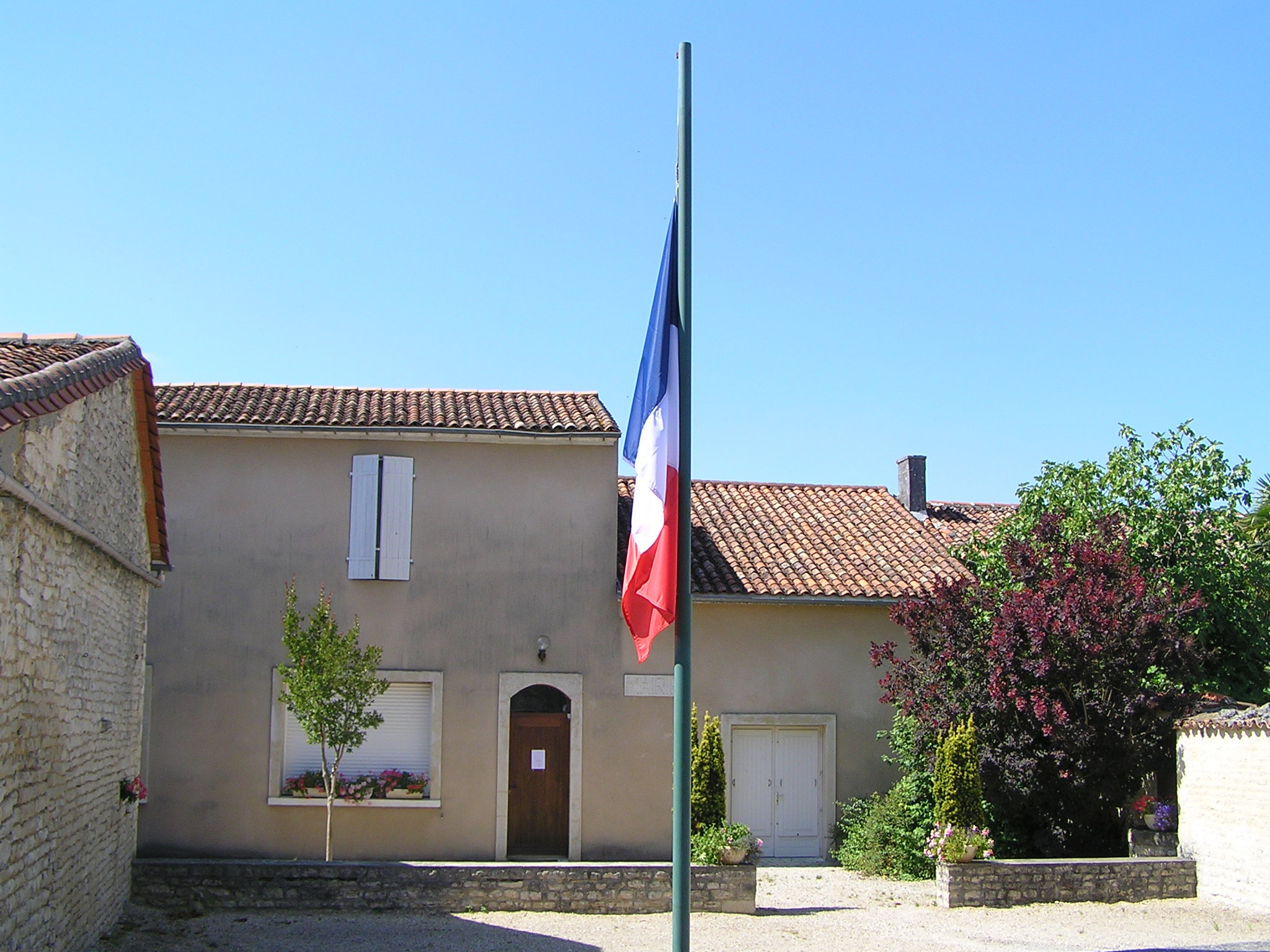
- Town hall
- Location of Plaizac
- Location within France Location within Nouvelle-Aquitaine
- Coordinates: 45°45′21″N 0°07′19″W
- Country: France
- Region: Nouvelle-Aquitaine
- Department: Charente
- Arrondissement: Cognac
- Canton: Val de Nouère
- Commune: Rouillac
- Area^{1}: 3.98 km^{2} (1.54 sq mi)
- Elevation: 87 m (285 ft)
- Highest elevation: 123 m (404 ft)
- Lowest elevation: 62 m (203 ft)
- Population (2023): 135
  - Density: 33.9/km^{2} (87.9/sq mi)
- Time zone: UTC+01:00 (CET)
  - Summer (DST): UTC+02:00 (CEST)
- Postal code: 16170
- ^{1} French Land Register data, which excludes lakes, ponds, glaciers > 1 km^{2} (0.386 sq mi or 247 acres) and river estuaries.

Plaizac (French pronunciation: [plɛzak]) is a former commune in the Charente department in southwestern France. On 1 January 2016, it was merged into the commune Rouillac.

== See also ==
- Communes of the Charente department
