= Rouillac, Charente =

Commune in Nouvelle-Aquitaine, France

Rouillac
- Commune
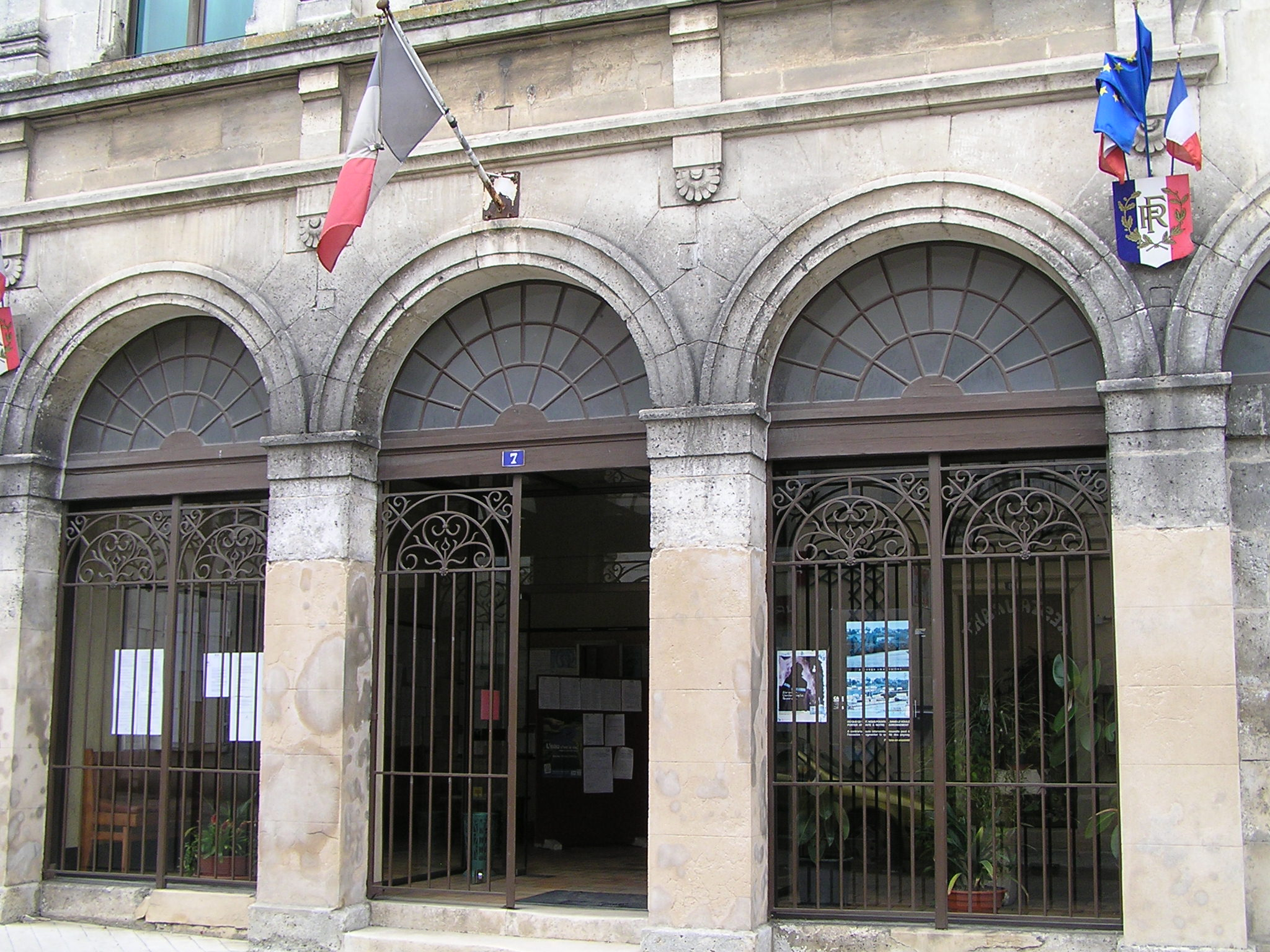
- Town hall

- Coat of arms
- Location of Rouillac
- Location within France Location within Nouvelle-Aquitaine
- Coordinates: 45°46′36″N 0°03′43″W
- Country: France
- Region: Nouvelle-Aquitaine
- Department: Charente
- Arrondissement: Cognac
- Canton: Val de Nouère
- Intercommunality: Rouillacais

Government
  - Mayor (2020–2026): Dominique Mancia
- Area^{1}: 56.61 km^{2} (21.86 sq mi)
- Highest elevation: 186 m (610 ft)
- Lowest elevation: 62 m (203 ft)
- Population (2023): 2,919
  - Density: 51.56/km^{2} (133.5/sq mi)
- Time zone: UTC+01:00 (CET)
  - Summer (DST): UTC+02:00 (CEST)
- INSEE/Postal code: 16286 /16170
- ^{1} French Land Register data, which excludes lakes, ponds, glaciers > 1 km^{2} (0.386 sq mi or 247 acres) and river estuaries.

Rouillac (French pronunciation: [ʁujak]) is a commune in the Charente department in southwestern France. On 1 January 2016, the former communes Plaizac and Sonneville were merged into Rouillac. On 1 January 2019, the former commune Gourville was merged into Rouillac.

== Population ==
Historical population
Year	Pop.	±% p.a.
1968	2,456	—
1975	2,560	+0.59%
1982	2,692	+0.72%
1990	2,606	−0.41%
1999	2,724	+0.49%
2007	2,767	+0.20%
2012	2,893	+0.89%
2017	2,976	+0.57%
2023	2,919	−0.32%
Populations of the area corresponding with the commune of Rouillac at 1 January 2025. Source: INSEE

== See also ==
- Communes of the Charente department
