= Gourville =

- Part of Rouillac
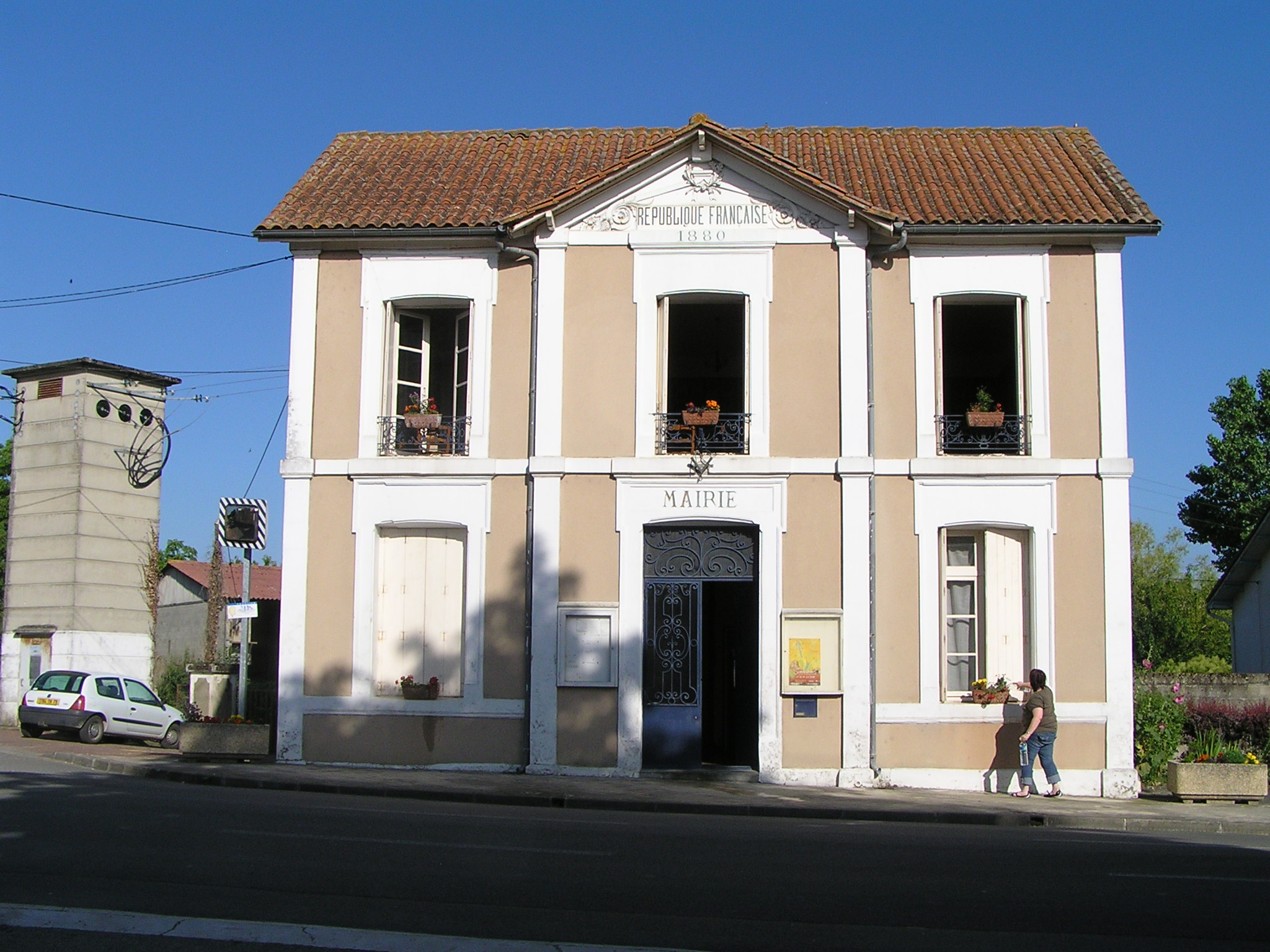
- Town hall
- Location of Gourville
- Location within France Location within Nouvelle-Aquitaine
- Coordinates: 45°49′51″N 0°00′50″W
- Country: France
- Region: Nouvelle-Aquitaine
- Department: Charente
- Arrondissement: Cognac
- Canton: Val de Nouère
- Commune: Rouillac
- Area^{1}: 12.92 km^{2} (4.99 sq mi)
- Elevation: 124 m (407 ft)
- Highest elevation: 155 m (509 ft)
- Lowest elevation: 55 m (180 ft)
- Population (2019): 661
  - Density: 51.2/km^{2} (133/sq mi)
- Time zone: UTC+01:00 (CET)
  - Summer (DST): UTC+02:00 (CEST)
- Postal code: 16170
- ^{1} French Land Register data, which excludes lakes, ponds, glaciers > 1 km^{2} (0.386 sq mi or 247 acres) and river estuaries.

Gourville (French pronunciation: [ɡuʁvil]) is a former commune in the Charente department in southwestern France. On 1 January 2019, it was merged into the commune Rouillac.

== Population ==
Historical population

Year	Pop.	±% p.a.
1793	1,115	—
1821	1,158	+0.14%
1846	1,112	−0.16%
1872	1,132	+0.07%
1886	862	−1.93%
1901	671	−1.66%
1926	587	−0.53%
1946	514	−0.66%

Year	Pop.	±% p.a.
1962	516	+0.02%
1968	550	+1.07%
1975	487	−1.72%
1982	534	+1.32%
1990	543	+0.21%
1999	589	+0.91%
2006	626	+0.87%
2019	661	+0.42%

Source: EHESS and INSEE (2019)

== See also ==
- Communes of the Charente department
