= Rancogne =

- Part of Moulins-sur-Tardoire
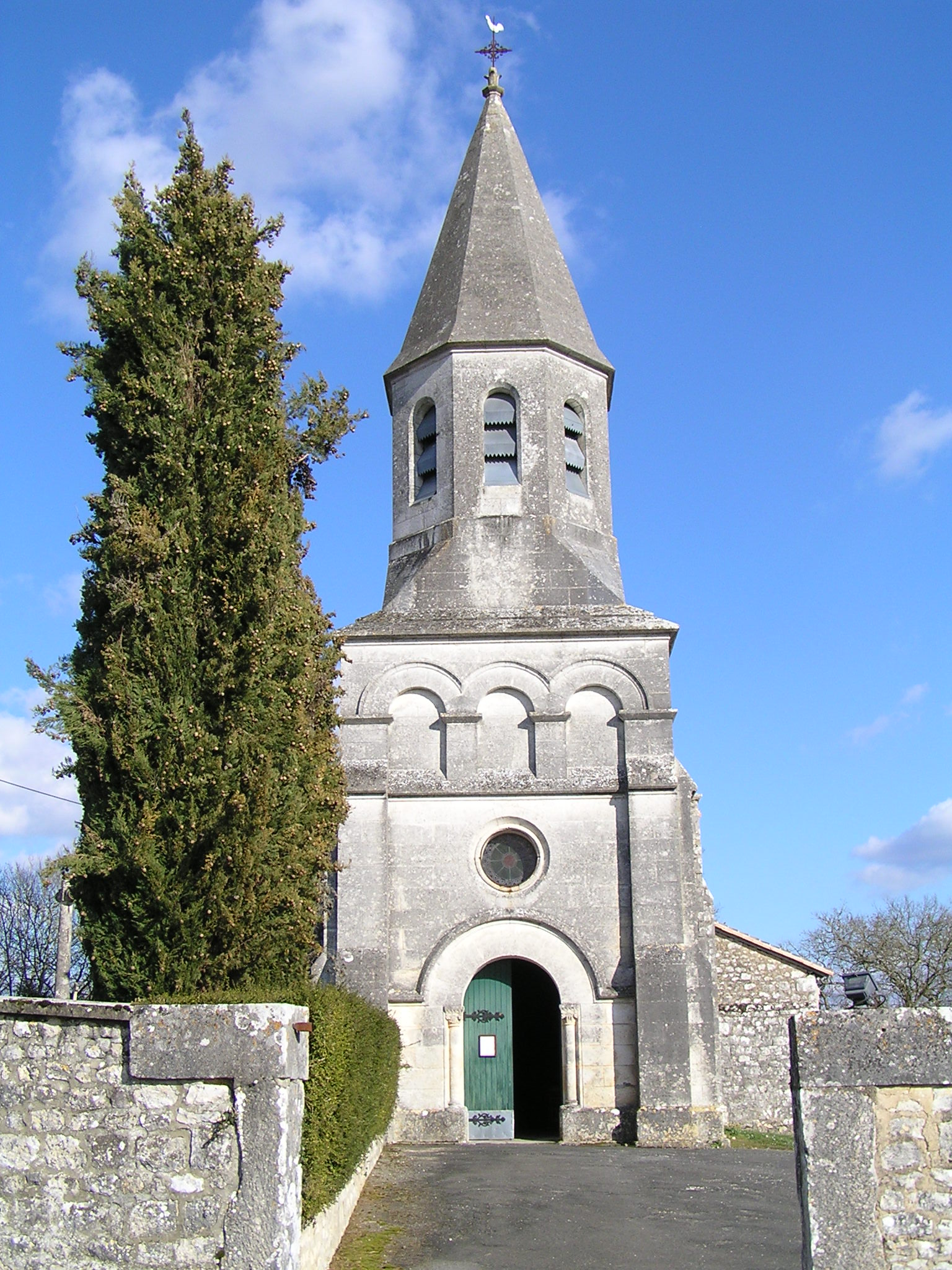
- Location of Rancogne
- Location within France Location within Nouvelle-Aquitaine
- Coordinates: 45°41′51″N 0°24′15″E
- Country: France
- Region: Nouvelle-Aquitaine
- Department: Charente
- Arrondissement: Angoulême
- Canton: Val de Tardoire
- Commune: Moulins-sur-Tardoire
- Area^{1}: 12.52 km^{2} (4.83 sq mi)
- Highest elevation: 136 m (446 ft)
- Lowest elevation: 81 m (266 ft)
- Population (2019): 354
  - Density: 28.3/km^{2} (73.2/sq mi)
- Time zone: UTC+01:00 (CET)
  - Summer (DST): UTC+02:00 (CEST)
- Postal code: 16110
- ^{1} French Land Register data, which excludes lakes, ponds, glaciers > 1 km^{2} (0.386 sq mi or 247 acres) and river estuaries.

Rancogne (French pronunciation: [ʁɑ̃kɔɲ]; Occitan: Ranconha) is a former commune in the Charente department in southwestern France. On 1 January 2019, it was merged into the new commune Moulins-sur-Tardoire.

== Population ==
Historical population

Year	Pop.	±% p.a.
1793	401	—
1821	458	+0.48%
1846	514	+0.46%
1872	391	−1.05%
1901	380	−0.10%
1926	322	−0.66%
1946	270	−0.88%
1962	259	−0.26%

Year	Pop.	±% p.a.
1968	252	−0.46%
1975	239	−0.75%
1982	264	+1.43%
1990	315	+2.23%
1999	330	+0.52%
2006	357	+1.13%
2019	354	−0.06%

Source: EHESS and INSEE (2019)

== See also ==
- Communes of the Charente department
