= Montgaudier Cave =

Prehistoric cave in Montbron, Charente, France

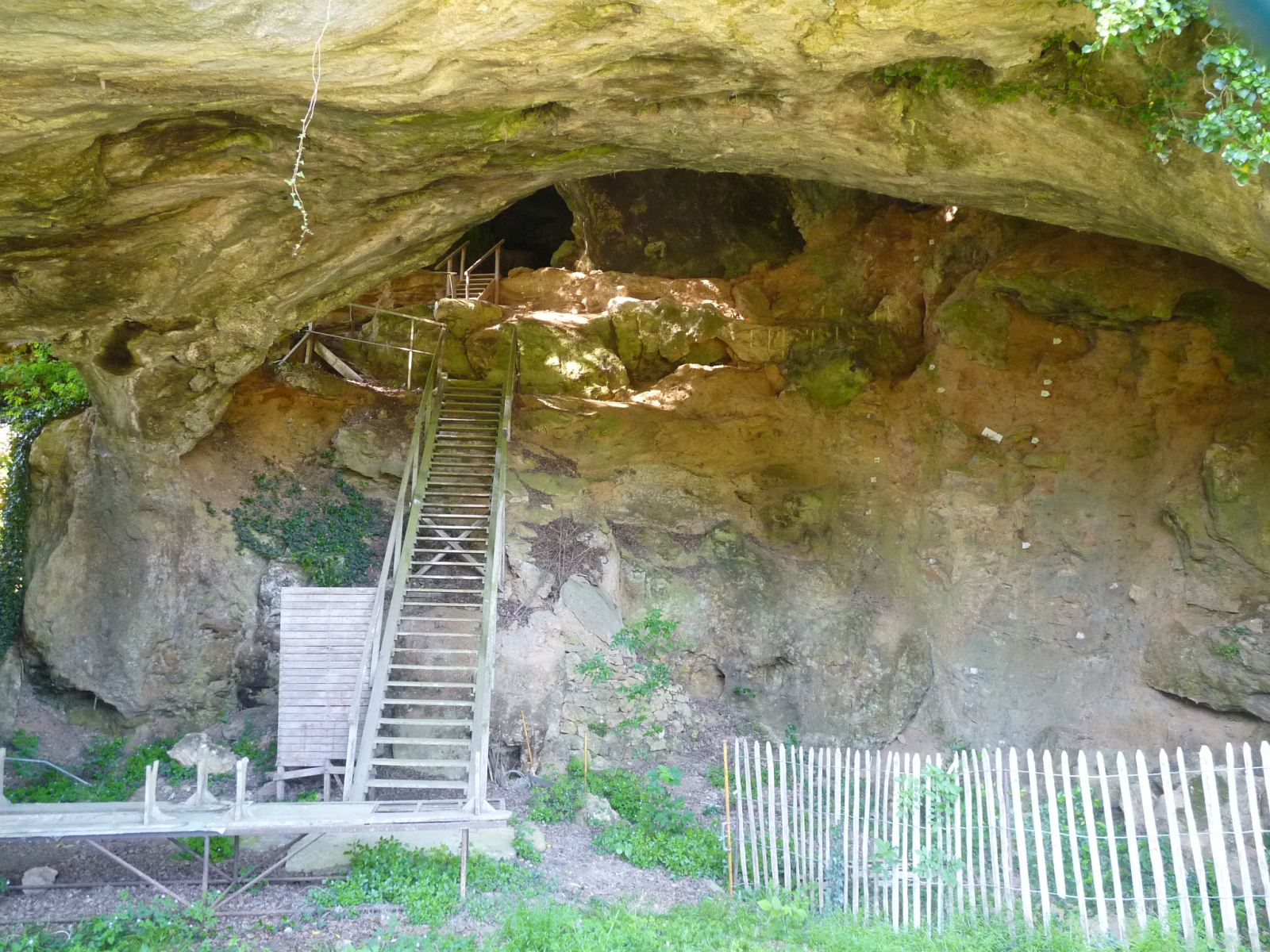
- Interior of the cave

- Location within Nouvelle-Aquitaine
- Interactive map of Montgaudier Cave
- Location: Montbron, Charente, Nouvelle-Aquitaine, France
- Coordinates: 45.667500°N 0.469722°E
- Elevation: 100 metres (330 ft)
- Geology: Limestone
- Features: Neanderthal and Homo sapiens remains, parietal and portable art, lithic and bone artifacts
- Valley: Tardoire
- Protection: Classified site since 1942

The Montgaudier Cave is a prehistoric site in Montbron, Charente, France, occupied from the Mousterian (Middle Paleolithic) to the Magdalenian (Upper Paleolithic). It has yielded Neanderthal and Homo sapiens remains, ancient faunal bones, extensive lithic and bone artifacts, and significant examples of parietal art and portable art.

== Location ==
Located in western Montbron, 27 kilometres (17 mi) east of Angoulême in Charente, the Montgaudier Cave is 3 kilometres (1.9 mi) from the Dordogne and 11 kilometres (6.8 mi) from Haute-Vienne. It opens into a cliff overlooking the Tardoire River, upstream from the Placard Cave, beneath a northeast-facing concave bank supporting Montgaudier Castle.

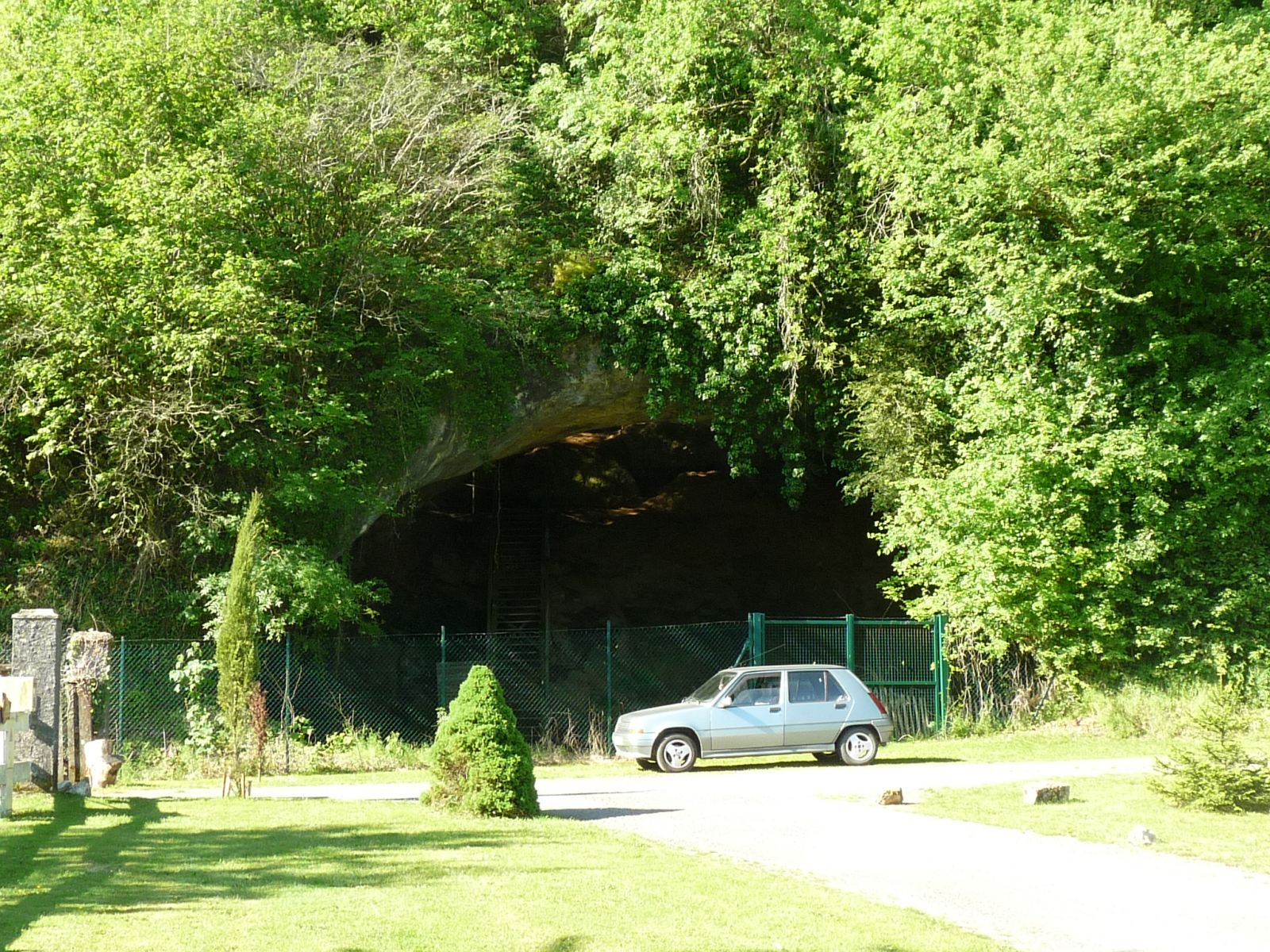
The cave entrance at the valley level.

== History ==
Excavations at Montgaudier began before 1850 with Édouard Lartet, followed by the Marquis de Vibraye, Tremeau de Rochebrune, Abbé Bourgeois, Abbé Delaunay, Fermond, and Albert Gaudry from 1867 to 1886. Further digs continued until 1959. In 1966, Louis Duport, at Jean Piveteau's request, resumed excavations, systematizing prior findings and discovering a Neanderthal jawbone (12–14½ years old) in 1974. The site has been a classified site since 1942.

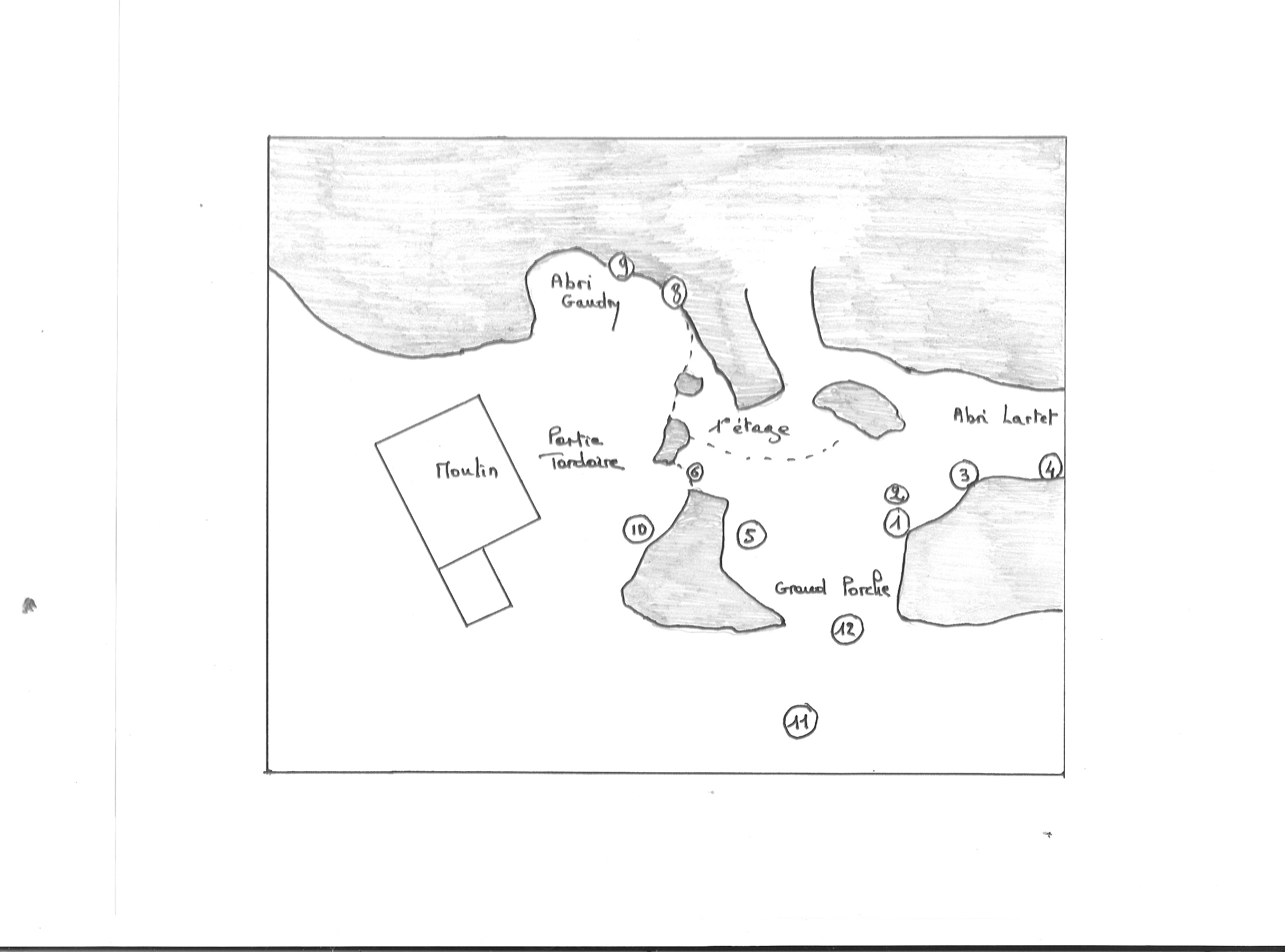
Schematic plan of the Montgaudier Cave.

== Topography ==
The cave comprises a complex system of shelters and cavities, accessed via 13 metres (43 ft)-wide, 10 metres (33 ft)-high porch leading to 20 metres (66 ft)-long cavity. Key areas include the Lartet Shelter (west) and the Tardoire section (east), encompassing the Gaudry and Paignon Shelters. Locus 12, excavated by Duport in 1983–1984, revealed a Magdalenian layer after test pits. Locus 11, 3 metres (9.8 ft) in front of the porch, indicates a post-Magdalenian vault collapse and an ancient Tardoire riverbed.

== Stratigraphy ==
The Great Porch contains approximately 30 sedimentary levels, dated to about 80,000 years ago, corresponding to loci 1–3, 5–6. The Lartet Shelter (locus 4) has six layers with an intact Mousterian level. The Gaudry Shelter (loci 8–9) includes nine layers, with Upper Magdalenian (layers 1–2) and possible Aurignacian (layer 5). A Quina-type Mousterian hearth exists in the Tardoire section. Locus 12 has four levels, including Magdalenian (layer 2) and possibly Gravettian (layer 4). The complex stratigraphy reflects extensive human activity across multiple periods.

== Ancient fauna ==
Locus 12 yielded bones of herbivores (horse, wild boar, deer, roe deer, fallow deer) and carnivores (cave lion, gray wolf, spotted hyena, cave bear, Arctic fox), radiocarbon-dated to 12,820 years BP (Magdalenian). Saiga antelope remains were also found. Layer 13 contains archaic fauna: Ursus deningeri (ancestor of Ursus spelaeus), Crocuta crocuta intermedia, and steppe rhinoceros (Dicerorhinus hemitoechus). These findings suggest a diverse paleoenvironment.

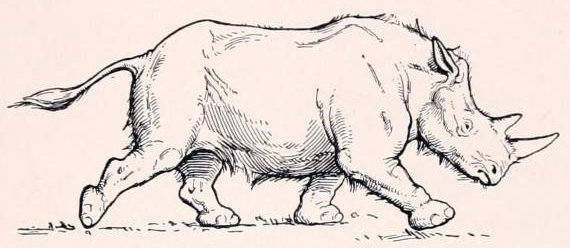
Steppe rhinoceros

== Human presence ==
The cave was occupied from the Mousterian to Magdalenian, with possible brief Upper Solutrean use of the Paignon Shelter. In 1974, a Neanderthal jawbone (12–14½ years old, likely Riss glaciation) was found, possibly from the Lartet Shelter. In 1988, a child's molar (8 years ±2, Middle Magdalenian) was discovered in locus 12. In 1968, two Homo sapiens skulls (young adult and child, 8–12 years) from the Gaudry Shelter were dated to Magdalenian V–VI, with a skull fragment from the Paignon Shelter's Magdalenian layer.

== Tools and artifacts ==
=== Acheulean ===
Layer 13 yielded flint and pebble tools predating the Riss glaciation, resembling worked pebbles.

=== Mousterian ===
The Lartet Shelter produced 3,144 objects, including 402 tools (80% scrapers, Charentian Mousterian, Ferrassie/Quina types). A paved floor (~30 square metres (320 sq ft)) and hearth were found, with another Quina-type hearth in the Tardoire section.

=== Aurignacian ===
Layer 5 (Tardoire section) contains a busked burin and sparse artifacts, indicating limited Aurignacian presence.

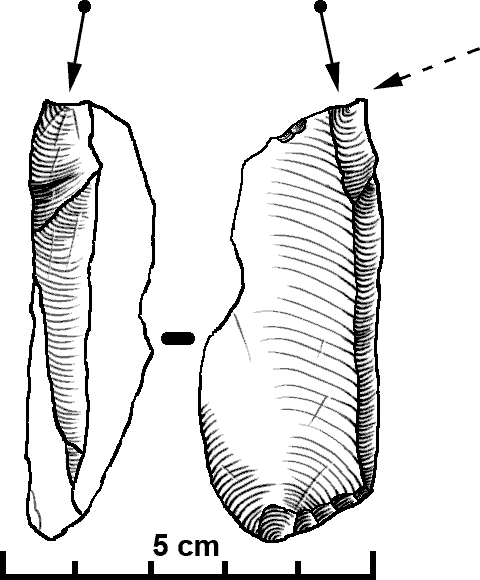
Drawing of a dihedral burin

=== Gravettian ===
Locus 6 (layer 4) yielded 650 objects, including 72 tools (scrapers, burins, awls) and a bone spear point. Middle Gravettian Noailles burins suggest Noaillian/Rayssian facies.

=== Solutrean ===
Sparse notched points, similar to those at Placard Cave, provide insufficient evidence for Solutrean occupation.

=== Magdalenian ===
Artifacts include scrapers, knives, bone awls, ivory smoothers, and a barbed harpoon (locus 12). The Paignon Shelter contains a hearth with engraved plaques.

=== Neolithic ===
A Neolithic axe blade, bowl, and Bell Beaker vessel with hatched bands were found.

== Parietal art ==
In 1978, a bovid engraving with signs, attributed to Magdalenian Style III, was uncovered on a collapsed block, reflecting symbolic or ritualistic expression.

== Portable art ==
=== Middle Magdalenian ===
The Paignon Shelter yielded an engraved sandstone (reindeer, bison, feline, salmon) and ornaments, including a bone pendant (13,320 years BP) and a pierced horse incisor with triangle engravings.

=== Final Magdalenian ===
In 1886, Eugène Paignon found a bâton percé (reindeer antler, 30 centimetres (12 in)) engraved with seals, salmon, and eels. Other artifacts include engraved ivory, a bone with a horse frieze, and ibex-decorated antler. Perforated shells and antler pieces served as ornaments. These objects suggest advanced artistic and symbolic practices.

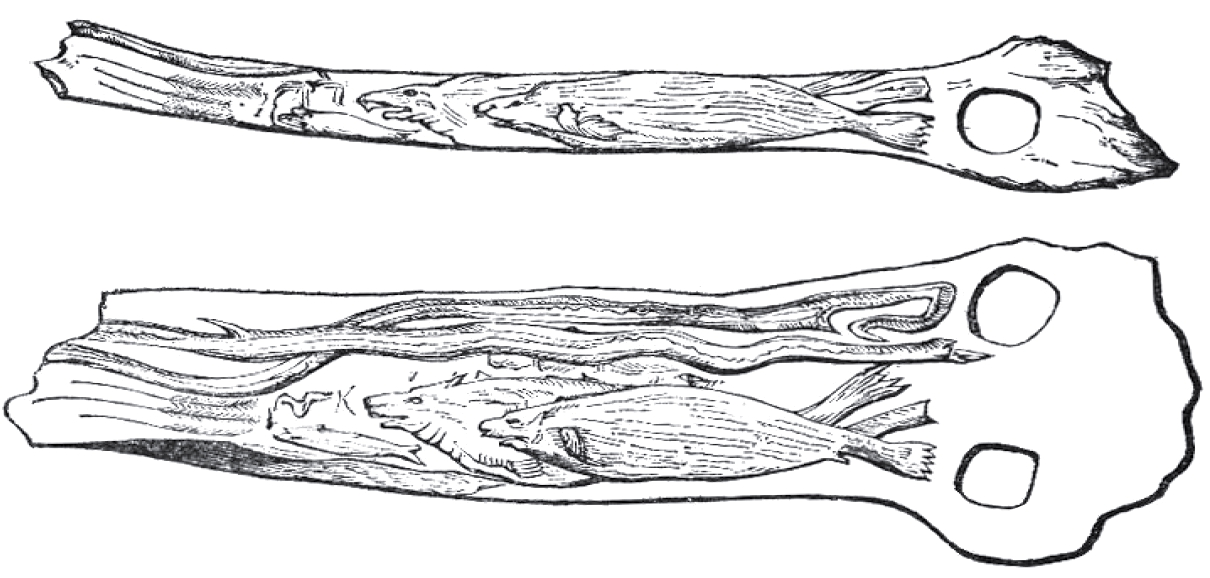
Drawing of the engraved bâton percé.

== See also ==
- Aurignacian
- Magdalenian
- Mousterian
- Gravettian
- Neanderthal
- Cro-Magnon
- Prehistoric art
- Paleolithic Europe
- Charente

== Bibliography ==
- Dujardin, Véronique. "Bibliographie des principaux sites paléolithiques du département de la Charente, section « Montbron, Montgaudier »" [Bibliography of the main Paleolithic sites in the Charente department, section "Montbron, Montgaudier"]. vdujardin.com (in French).
- Airvaux, Jean; Duport, Louis; Lévêque, François (1999). Un siècle de recherches préhistoriques en Charente. La Charente Paléolithique dans son contexte régional [A century of prehistoric research in Charente. Paleolithic Charente in its regional context] (in French). Angoulême: Association pour la valorisation du patrimoine préhistorique de la Charente.
- Airvaux, Jean (2002). L'art préhistorique du Poitou-Charentes [Prehistoric art of Poitou-Charentes] (in French). Paris: La Maison des Roches. ISBN 2-912691-13-3.
- David, P.; Pintaud, R. (1957). "La grotte de Montgaudier" [The Montgaudier Cave]. Actes du Congrès préhistorique de France, XVe session, Poitiers-Angoulême, 1956 (in French).
- Debénath, André (2006). Néandertaliens et Cro-Magnons, les temps glaciaires dans le bassin de la Charente [Neanderthals and Cro-Magnons, the glacial times in the Charente basin] (in French). Paris: Le Croît Vif. p. 356. ISBN 2-916104-00-3.
- Duport, Louis (1977). Dix années de fouilles à Montgaudier, 1966-1976 [Ten years of excavations at Montgaudier, 1966-1976] (in French). Angoulême: Comité d'animation culturelle d'Angoulême et de la Charente.
- Nadaillac, Albert de (1887). "La grotte de Mongaudier" [The Montgaudier Cave]. Compte-rendu de l'Académie des Inscriptions et des Belles Lettres (in French). 31 (1).
