= Sonneville =

- Part of Rouillac
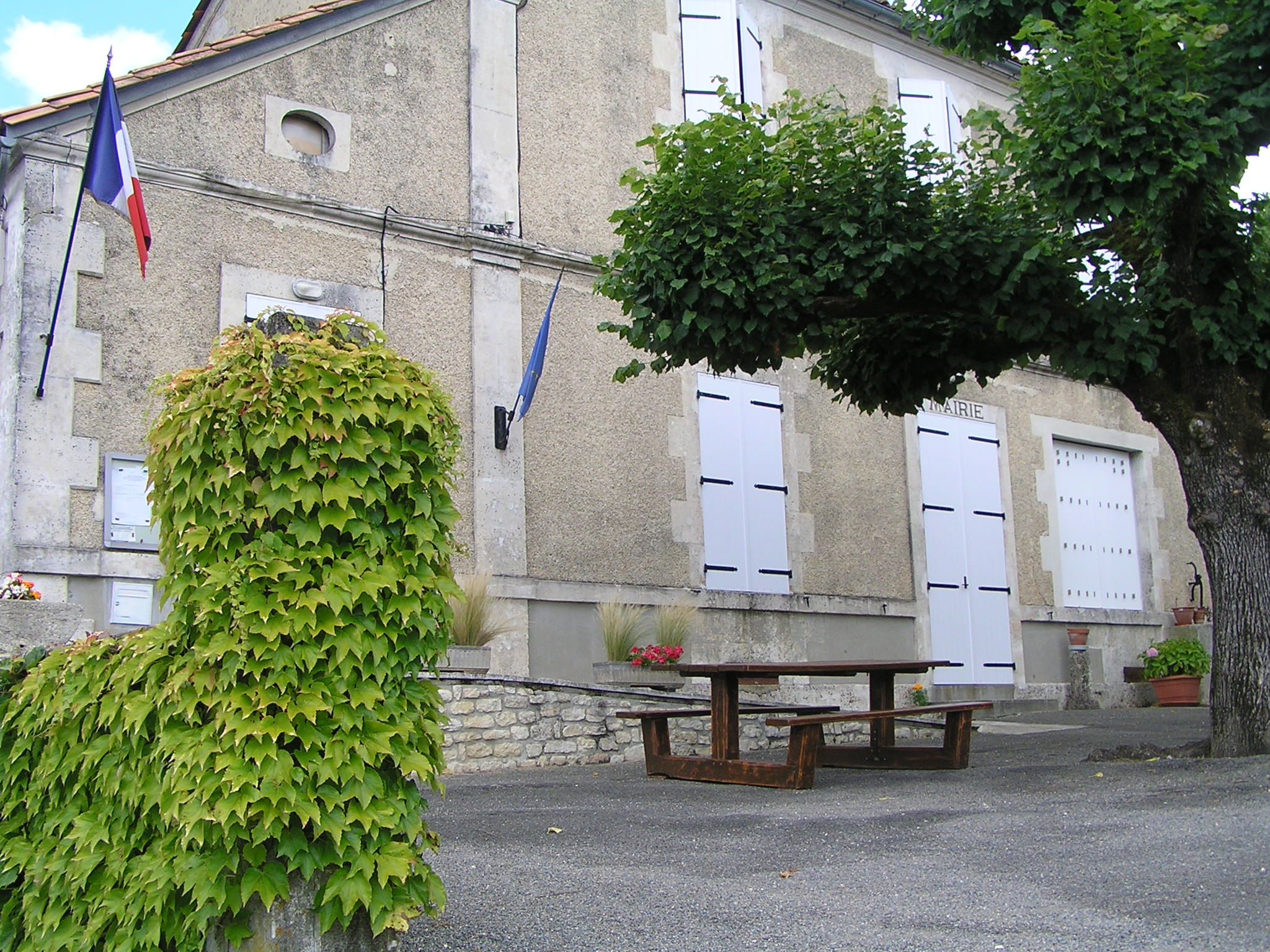
- Town hall
- Location of Sonneville
- Location within France Location within Nouvelle-Aquitaine
- Coordinates: 45°48′16″N 0°07′58″W
- Country: France
- Region: Nouvelle-Aquitaine
- Department: Charente
- Arrondissement: Cognac
- Canton: Val de Nouère
- Commune: Rouillac
- Area^{1}: 10.43 km^{2} (4.03 sq mi)
- Elevation: 115 m (377 ft)
- Highest elevation: 161 m (528 ft)
- Lowest elevation: 68 m (223 ft)
- Population (2019): 227
  - Density: 21.8/km^{2} (56.4/sq mi)
- Time zone: UTC+01:00 (CET)
  - Summer (DST): UTC+02:00 (CEST)
- Postal code: 16170
- ^{1} French Land Register data, which excludes lakes, ponds, glaciers > 1 km^{2} (0.386 sq mi or 247 acres) and river estuaries.

Sonneville is a former commune in the Charente department in southwestern France. On 1 January 2016, it was merged into the commune Rouillac.

== Population ==
Historical population

Year	Pop.	±% p.a.
1793	489	—
1821	505	+0.12%
1846	504	−0.01%
1872	485	−0.15%
1901	365	−0.98%
1926	308	−0.68%
1946	260	−0.84%

Year	Pop.	±% p.a.
1962	274	+0.33%
1968	251	−1.45%
1975	246	−0.29%
1982	233	−0.77%
1990	217	−0.89%
1999	218	+0.05%
2019	227	+0.20%

Source: EHESS and INSEE (2019)

== See also ==
- Communes of the Charente department
