= La Chaire a Calvin =

Cave and archaeological site in France

Coordinates: 45.5553°N 0.1158°E

La Chaire-à-Calvin
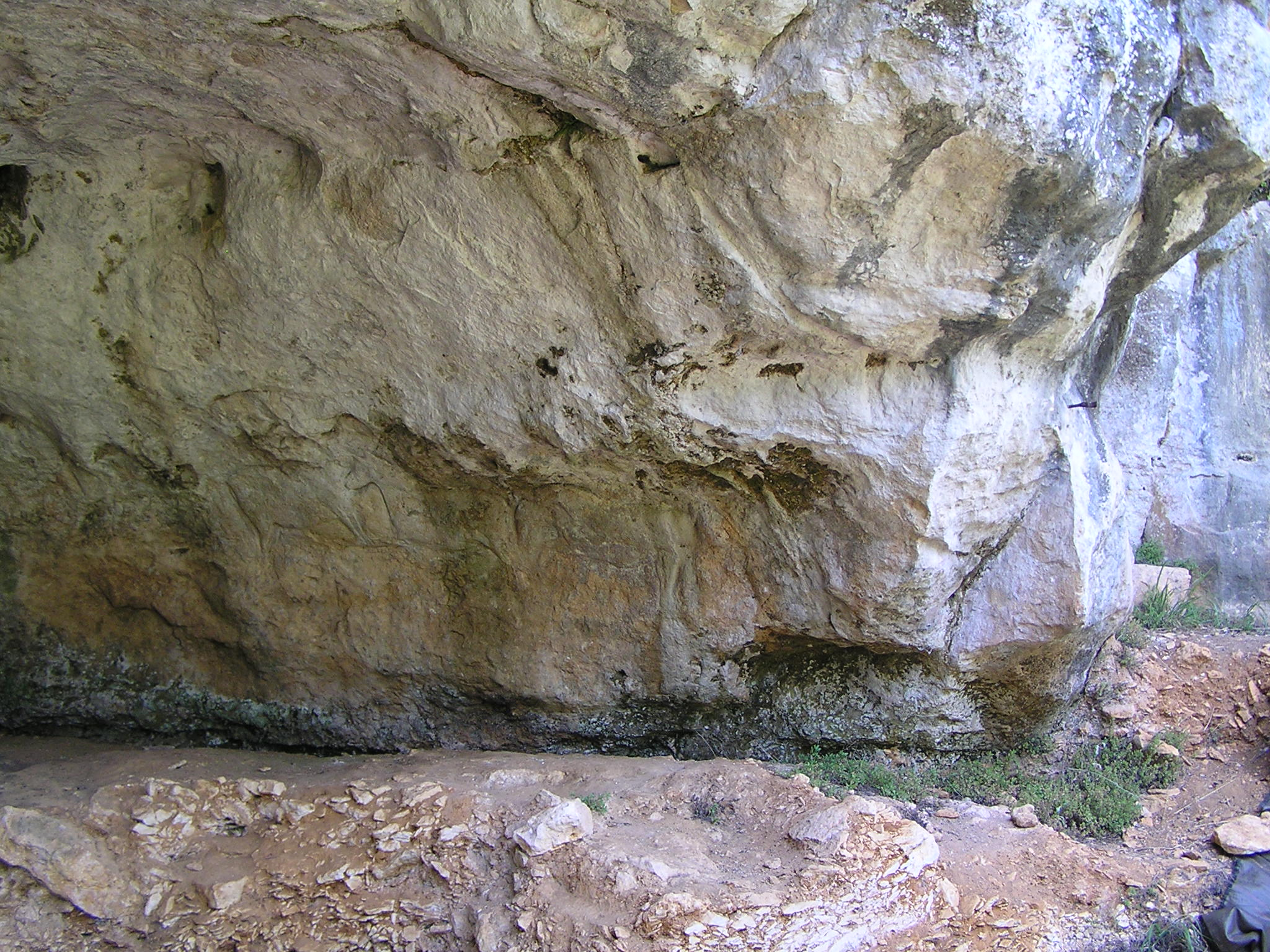
- La frise de chevaux de la Chaire à Calvin
- Interactive map of La Chaire-à-Calvin
- Location: Mouthiers-sur-Boëme, Charente, France

La Chaire a Calvin is a rock shelter near the village of Mouthiers-sur-Boëme in the Département of Charente, situated in the valley of the Gersac stream. The shelter is on a cliff which faces south east. The rock face of this rock-shelter has a sculpted frieze dated to the Magdalenian period; approximately 15000 years BP.

This site was studied by Pierre David from 1924 onwards, who discovered the frieze in 1926. It was further studied by Bouvier in the 1960s.

== Archaeology ==
This site contains the remains of rhinoceros, red deer, beaver, wolf, Saiga Antelope, tarpan, reindeer and aurochs, as well as fox, hare and indeterminate birds. The remains of Saiga Antelope were the most numerous animal remains discovered, they have been dated to around 16 000BP.

The only human remains discovered are a single molar, discovered in 1933 and attributed to the Magdelenian.

Artifacts found include bone needles, squared bone spear head; a shellfish necklace and some pearls. Stone artifacts include bladelets, chisels and scrapers.

The lithics industry associated with the site appears to be Magdelenian, although it is not sure from which stage of the Magdelenian, at least one point which may be azilian was found in bed 1. Burins and end-scrapers are very common.

Some bone tools have also been recovered, including needles and spear-heads. Perforated beads were discovered which indicate some long-distance exchange with contemporary groups.

== The Parietal Art ==
The frieze is the only example of parietal art still visible in Charente. The frieze includes depictions of an aurochs without its head, a pregnant tarpan, and a mating scene of tarpans. Some traces of orange-red paint were found when the frieze was discovered. Pierre David published a description of the frieze in 1928 and 1929.

== In History ==
John Calvin, a Presbyterian reformer, preached on a rock platform near this shelter when he was living in Angouleme in 1520.
