= Balzac, Charente =

Balzac
- Commune
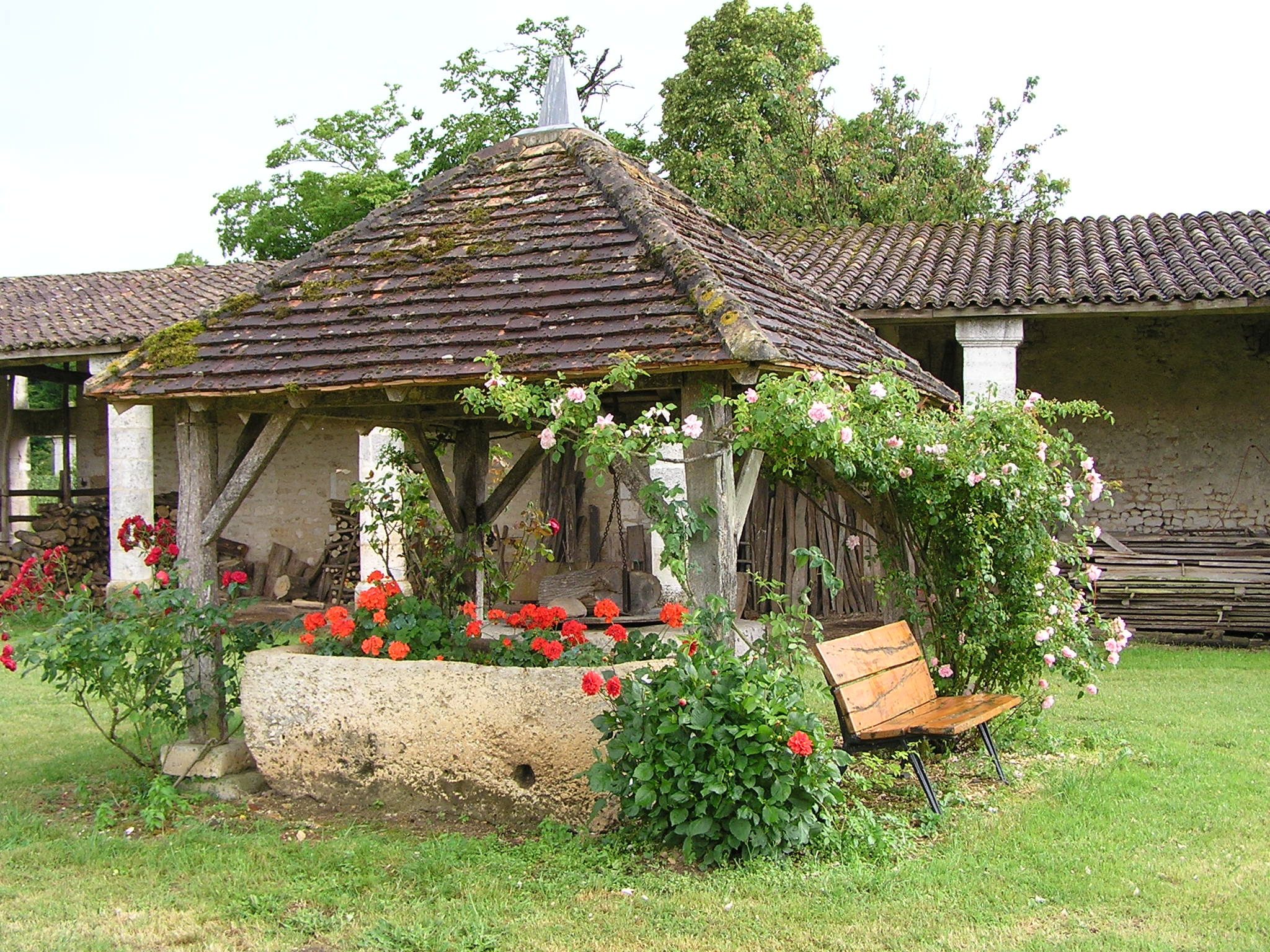
- Old well in front of the Chateau

- Coat of arms
- Location of Balzac
- Location within France Location within Nouvelle-Aquitaine
- Coordinates: 45°42′38″N 0°08′14″E
- Country: France
- Region: Nouvelle-Aquitaine
- Department: Charente
- Arrondissement: Angoulême
- Canton: Gond-Pontouvre
- Intercommunality: CA Grand Angoulême

Government
  - Mayor (2020–2026): Jean-Claude Courari
- Area^{1}: 9.64 km^{2} (3.72 sq mi)
- Elevation: 40 m (130 ft)
- Highest elevation: 102 m (335 ft)
- Lowest elevation: 30 m (98 ft)
- Population (2023): 1,410
  - Density: 146/km^{2} (379/sq mi)
- Time zone: UTC+01:00 (CET)
  - Summer (DST): UTC+02:00 (CEST)
- INSEE/Postal code: 16026 /16430
- ^{1} French Land Register data, which excludes lakes, ponds, glaciers > 1 km^{2} (0.386 sq mi or 247 acres) and river estuaries.

Balzac (French pronunciation: [balzak]) is a commune in the Charente department in the Nouvelle-Aquitaine region of south-western France.

== Geography ==
Balzac is located some 7 km north-west of Angoulême. Access to the commune is by the D737 from Angoulême which passes through the east of the commune and the town continuing north to Montignac-Charente. The D105 branches off the D737 north of the town and goes east to Champniers. The D406 also branches off the D737 and goes west to Vindelle. Apart from the town there are the hamlets of Coursac, La Chapelle, Les Chabots, and Les Courlis in the commune. The commune is mostly farmland with a small forest in the south-west and a significant urban area for the town.

=== Geology and terrain ===
Balzac occupies the interior of a wide bend of the Charente. The bedrock of the large eastern half of the commune, which is the highest in altitude, consists of limestone dating from the Upper Jurassic (Kimmeridgian) period.

The centre of the town, between Labbés, Genin, and Texier, is located on old alluvium from the Quaternary period.

The western part of the commune, between La Chapelle and Chabots, contains other alluvial deposits which form a low terrace. The river bed (floodplain) is itself made up of more recent alluvium (silt, sandy clay, and peat).

The terrain that separates the valley of the Charente from that of the Argence forms a kind of long cliff, very high and steep in its northern part, which is the concave side of the bend in the river near the villages of Coursac and Font-Saint-Martin, which gradually decreases in height to end at the foot of the Chateau of Balzac.

The highest point in the commune is at an altitude of 102 m east at Puylebin to the east of Coursac. The lowest point is 30 m on the Charente river at the confluence of the Argence. The village is about 60 m above sea level.

=== Hydrography ===
The river Charente forms the entire south, west, and north-west border of the commune as it flows around the commune and continues south-east to eventually join the Atlantic Ocean at Rochefort. The Argence flows from the north-east and forms much of the eastern border where it joins the Charente in the south-eastern corner of the commune.

=== Climate ===
The climate is oceanic Aquitaine and similar to the town of Cognac where the departmental weather station is located.

Comparison of local Meteorological data with other cities in France
Town	Sunshine (hours/yr)	Rain (mm/yr)	Snow (days/yr)	Storm (days/yr)	Fog (days/yr)
National average	1,973	770	14	22	40
Balzac	2,027	763	3	23	54
Paris	1,661	637	12	18	10
Nice	2,724	767	1	29	1
Strasbourg	1,693	665	29	29	56
Brest	1,605	1,211	7	12	75

Climate data for Cognac
Month	Jan	Feb	Mar	Apr	May	Jun	Jul	Aug	Sep	Oct	Nov	Dec	Year
Mean daily maximum °C (°F)	9.4 (48.9)	11.0 (51.8)	14.4 (57.9)	16.9 (62.4)	20.8 (69.4)	24.3 (75.7)	26.8 (80.2)	26.7 (80.1)	23.5 (74.3)	19.0 (66.2)	13.0 (55.4)	9.8 (49.6)	18.0 (64.4)
Daily mean °C (°F)	6.1 (43.0)	6.9 (44.4)	9.7 (49.5)	11.9 (53.4)	15.8 (60.4)	19.0 (66.2)	21.1 (70.0)	20.9 (69.6)	17.9 (64.2)	14.4 (57.9)	9.3 (48.7)	6.6 (43.9)	13.3 (55.9)
Mean daily minimum °C (°F)	2.8 (37.0)	2.8 (37.0)	4.9 (40.8)	6.9 (44.4)	10.6 (51.1)	13.6 (56.5)	15.3 (59.5)	15.0 (59.0)	12.3 (54.1)	9.9 (49.8)	5.6 (42.1)	3.3 (37.9)	8.6 (47.5)
Average precipitation mm (inches)	70.5 (2.78)	51.4 (2.02)	57.2 (2.25)	69.6 (2.74)	63.8 (2.51)	50.6 (1.99)	47.4 (1.87)	45.3 (1.78)	59.3 (2.33)	79.5 (3.13)	85.1 (3.35)	83.1 (3.27)	762.8 (30.03)
Average precipitation days (≥ 1 mm)	11.6	9.2	10.1	11.2	10.5	7.4	6.9	6.5	8.0	11.2	11.5	11.6	115.7
Mean monthly sunshine hours	77.3	111.1	160.2	179.3	211.4	351.4	254.6	239.4	219.3	141.6	91.4	89.6	2,026.6
Source: Meteorological data for Cognac - 59m altitude, from 1981 to 2010 January 2015 (in French)

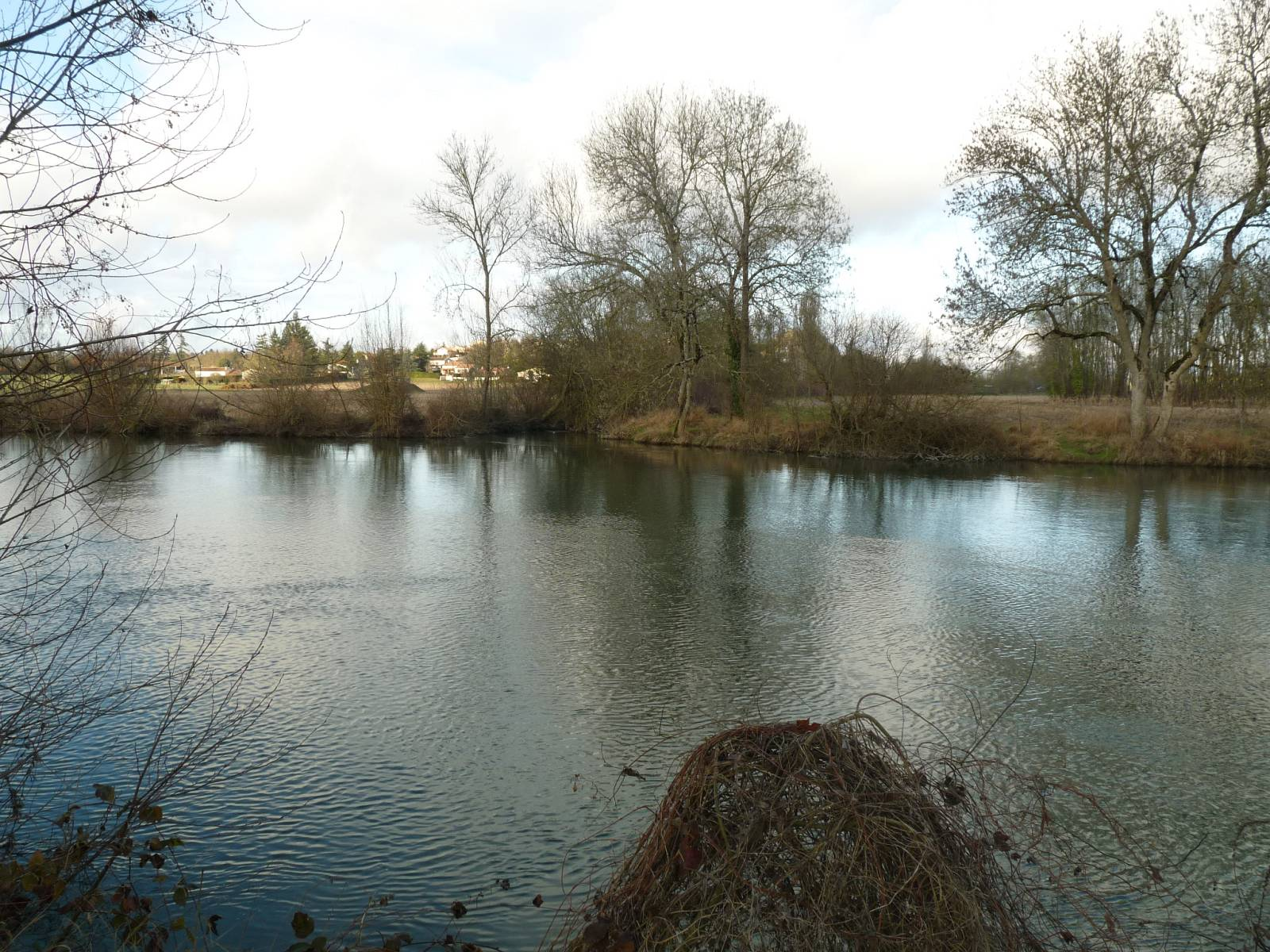
Confluence of the Argence with the Charente

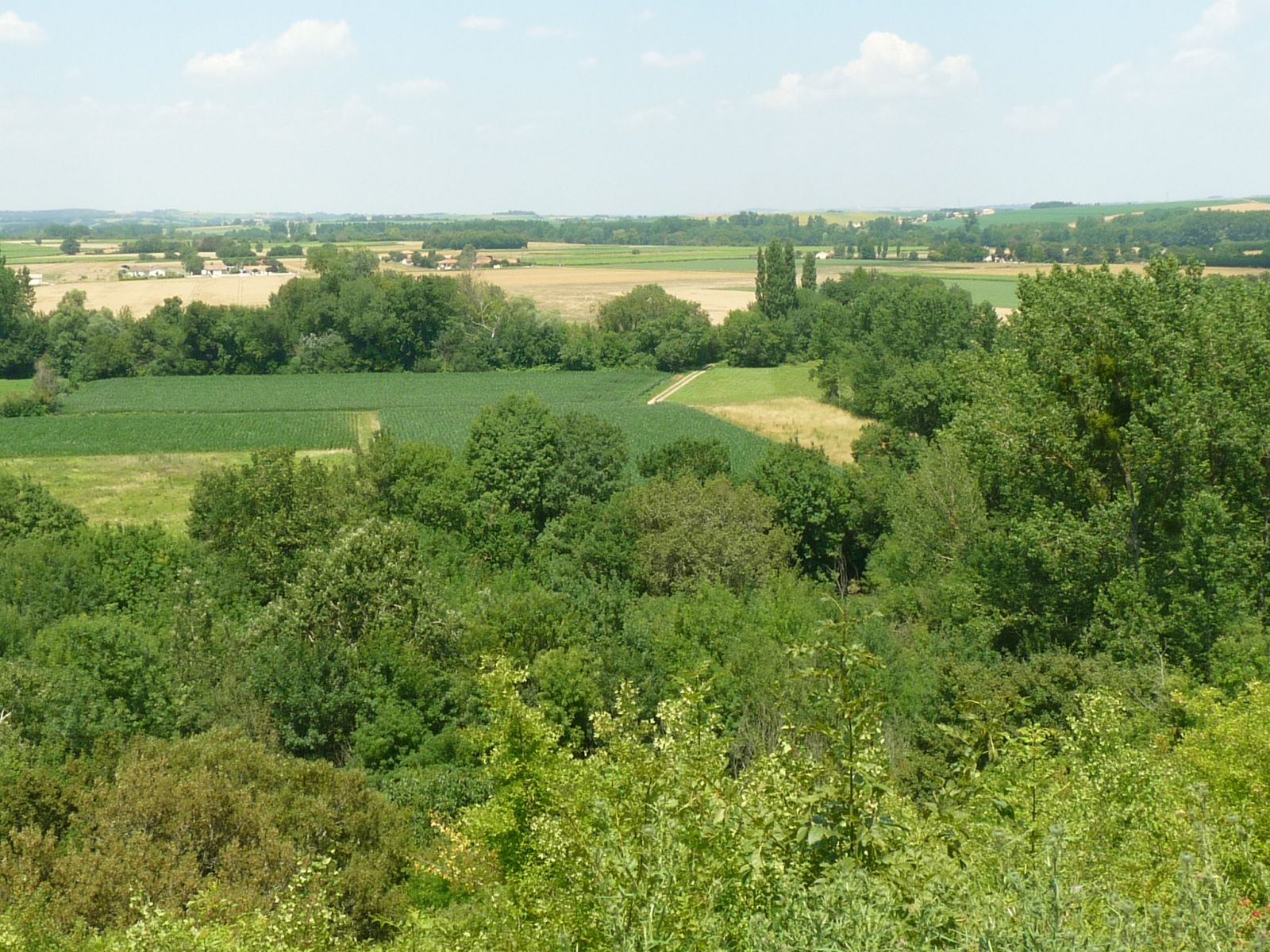
View of Font-Saint-Martin in the Charente Valley

== Toponymy ==
Old forms of the name Balzac are Balazacum and Balazaco in 1298.

According to Dauzat, the origin of the name Balzac dates back to a Gallo-Roman person Ballitius, which itself is derived from Ballius, to which is added the suffix -acum which would give Ballitiacum or "Domain of Ballitius". According to other sources, Balatius was the name of a Gallic man, derived from Balatos.

== History ==
Aerial archaeology has revealed evidence of a Neolithic Bronze Age Promontory fort on the slopes of Coursac in a position dominating the Charente.

A Chateau existed in the 12th century and Balzac was a former fief under the Bishopric of Angoulême and the barony of Tourriers which was acquired in 1398 by Guy de La Rochefoucauld. From the 12th to the 17th century the chateau passed through many hands. The present chateau was rebuilt on the same site in 1600 by Guillaume Guez and his wife who left from time to time for their house in Angoulême. It was the residence of the family Guez de Balzac and Jean-Louis Guez de Balzac, the "Restorer of the French Language", lived there.

From 4 March to 29 August 1619 Marie de' Medici was hosted there by the Guez family, "not wishing to stay elsewhere until the peace that made her son Louis XIII". The castle became the crossroads for personalities of the time during her stay - such as Cardinal Richelieu, the Duke of Épernon, the Cardinal de La Rochefoucauld, and the Count of Bethune.

The road to Vars was a transport route by donkey for Salt to the port of Basseau. The name la Montée des Sauniers (Ascent of Salt workers) above Coursac came from this.

Formerly the Terrier de Bourguignol, then called the Plantier de Bourguignone, located near the Pont Suraud (Suraud Bridge) on the Argence was a dolmen called the Tomb of Bourguignon which was still visible in 1760.

At the beginning of the 20th century cherries and peas from Balzac were particularly appreciated from Angoulême to Paris. The fields provided milk feeding two major dairy factories in the commune, run by Messrs. Hortolan and Rochier.

=== Heraldry ===
Arms of Balzac	Coat of Arms Blazon: Quarterly, at 1 and 4 Vert, a bouquet in Sable; at 2 and 3 Argent a bugle-horn of Or stringed the same.

== Administration ==
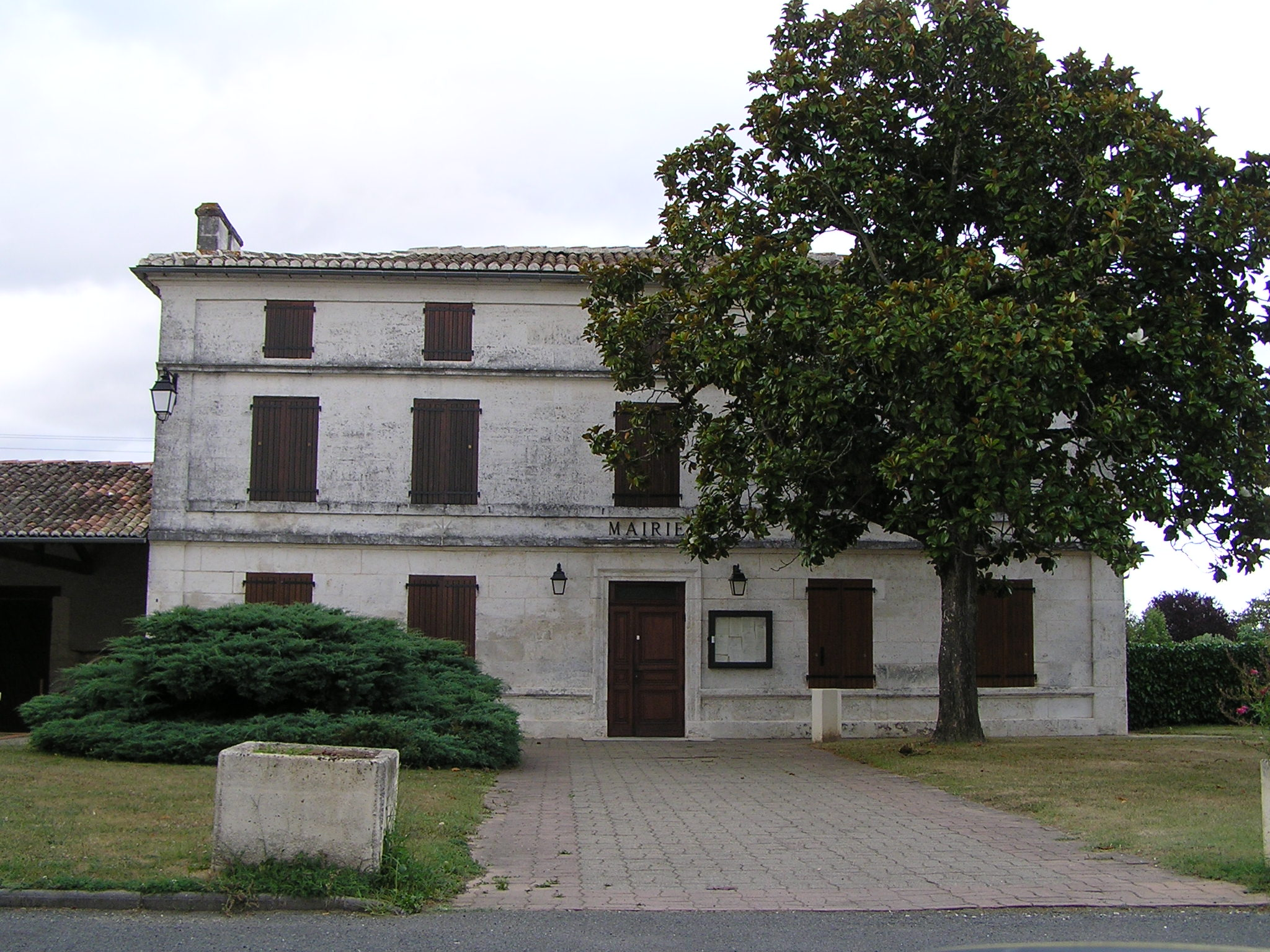
The Town Hall

List of Successive Mayors

From	To	Name
1995	2026	Jean-Claude Courari

== Demography ==
The inhabitants of the commune are known as Balzatois or Balzatoises in French. Balzac lost 30% of its population in the second half of the 19th century which then stabilised and experienced consistent growth in the last quarter of the 20th century.

Historical population

Year	Pop.	±% p.a.
1793	957	—
1800	1,016	+0.86%
1806	905	−1.91%
1821	961	+0.40%
1831	1,000	+0.40%
1841	968	−0.32%
1846	942	−0.54%
1851	928	−0.30%
1856	918	−0.22%
1861	838	−1.81%
1866	815	−0.56%
1872	785	−0.62%
1876	780	−0.16%
1881	768	−0.31%
1886	798	+0.77%
1891	727	−1.85%
1896	705	−0.61%
1901	688	−0.49%

Year	Pop.	±% p.a.
1906	708	+0.57%
1911	644	−1.88%
1921	612	−0.51%
1926	605	−0.23%
1931	623	+0.59%
1936	613	−0.32%
1946	621	+0.13%
1954	644	+0.46%
1962	606	−0.76%
1968	687	+2.11%
1975	809	+2.36%
1982	934	+2.07%
1990	1,185	+3.02%
1999	1,237	+0.48%
2007	1,246	+0.09%
2012	1,326	+1.25%
2017	1,337	+0.17%
2023	1,410	+0.89%

Source: EHESS and INSEE

== Facilities ==
=== Education ===
The school is an Inter-communal Educational Grouping (RPI) with Vindelle. Balzac has a primary school (Nursery and from CP to CE2) and Vindelle has an elementary school (from CE2 to CM2). The Jean Caillard High School for Balzac is located in Genins.

== Sites and monuments ==
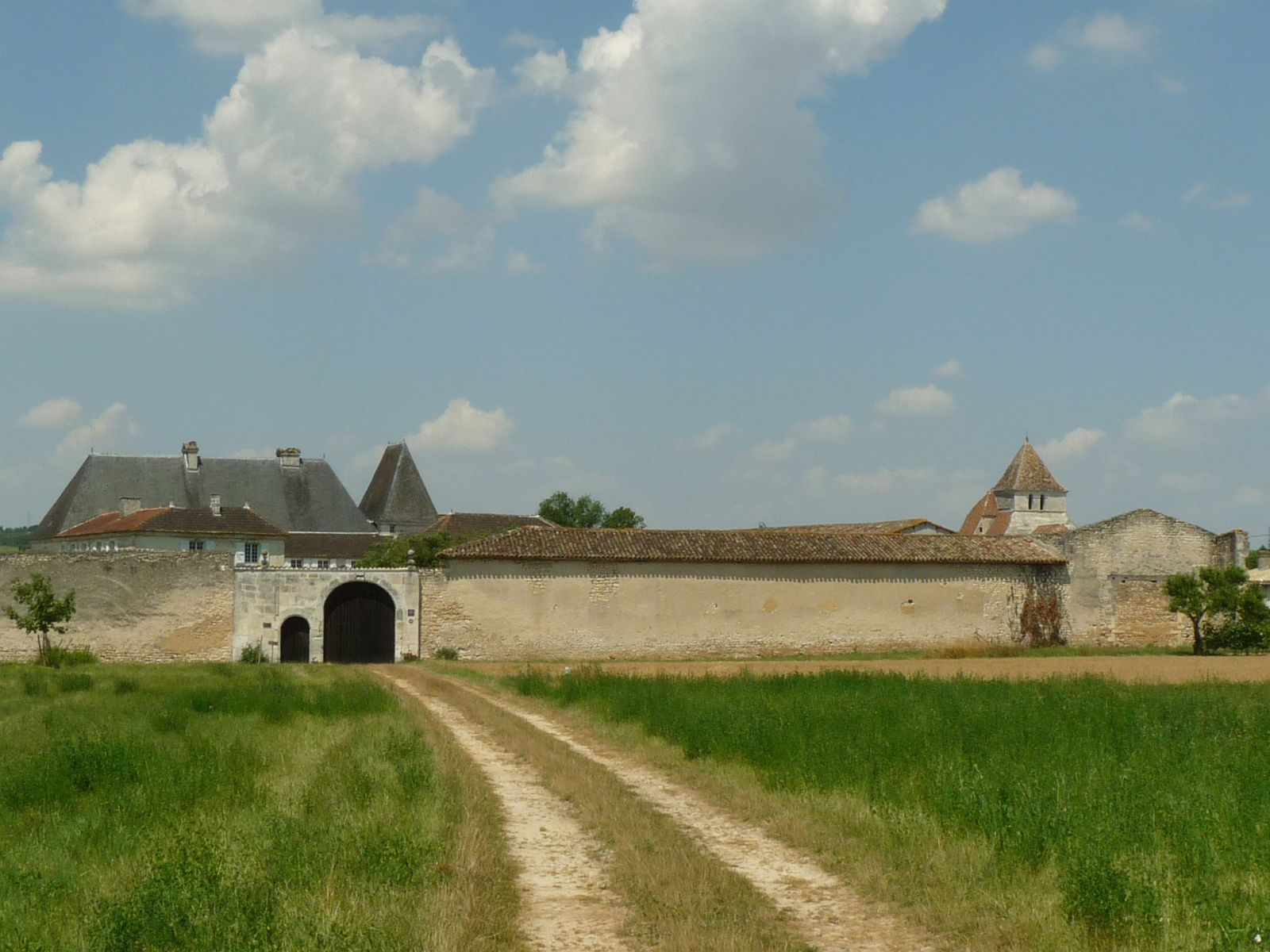
The Chateau of Balzac

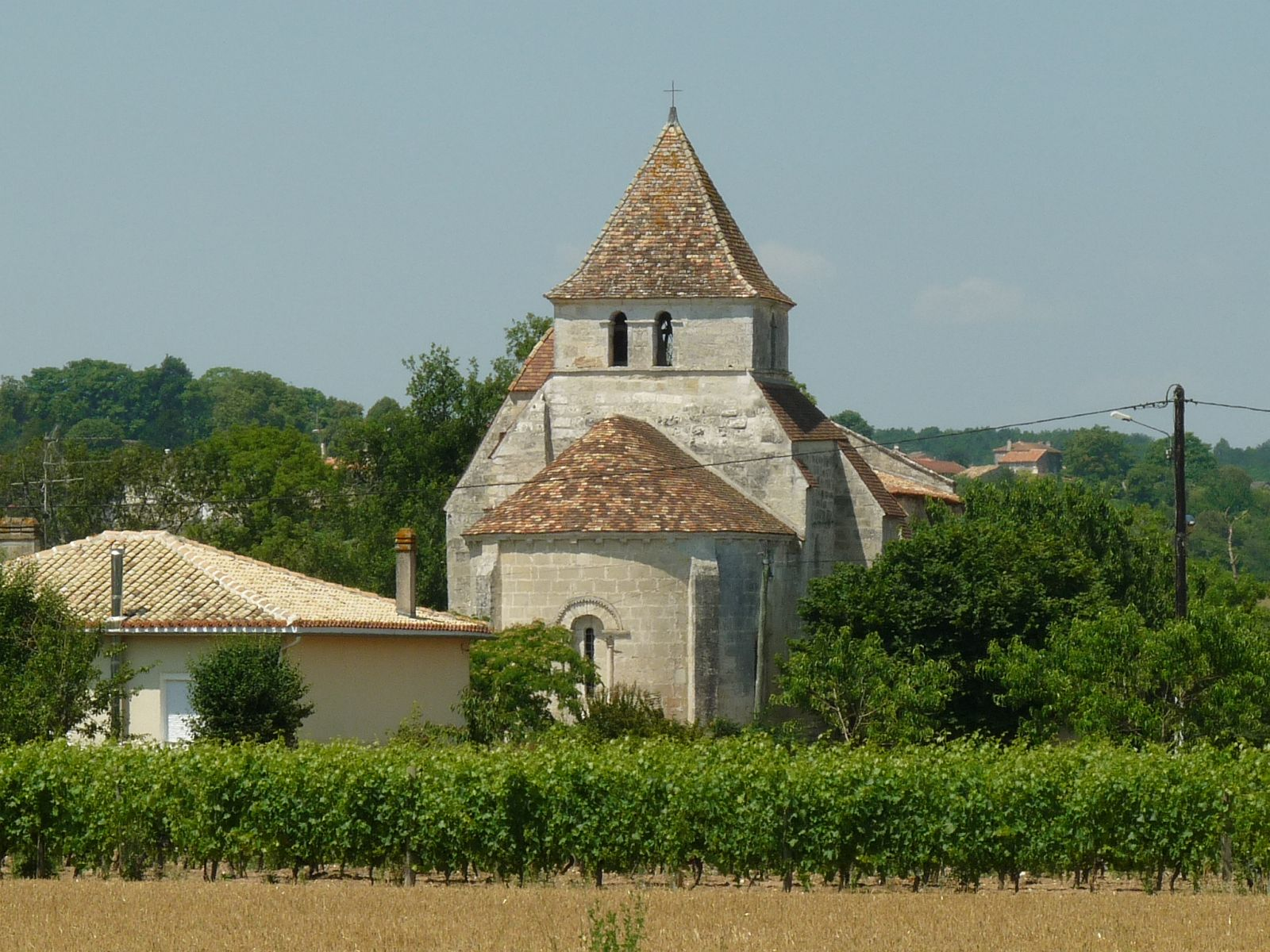
The Church of Saint Martin

- The Chateau of Balzac (17th century) is registered as an historical monument. was built by the father of Jean-Louis Guez de Balzac. This chateau has lodgings which overlook the Charente and is surrounded by a park enclosed by walls with pierced portals. There are also a canal, a fishpond, a lavoir, and a feudal church.
- The Parish church of Saint Martin is located in the town next to the castle. It is of Romanesque architecture and dates from the 12th century.

Balzac is also the location of the headquarters of the Community of communes of Braconne and Charente.

=== Chateau of Balzac Picture Gallery ===
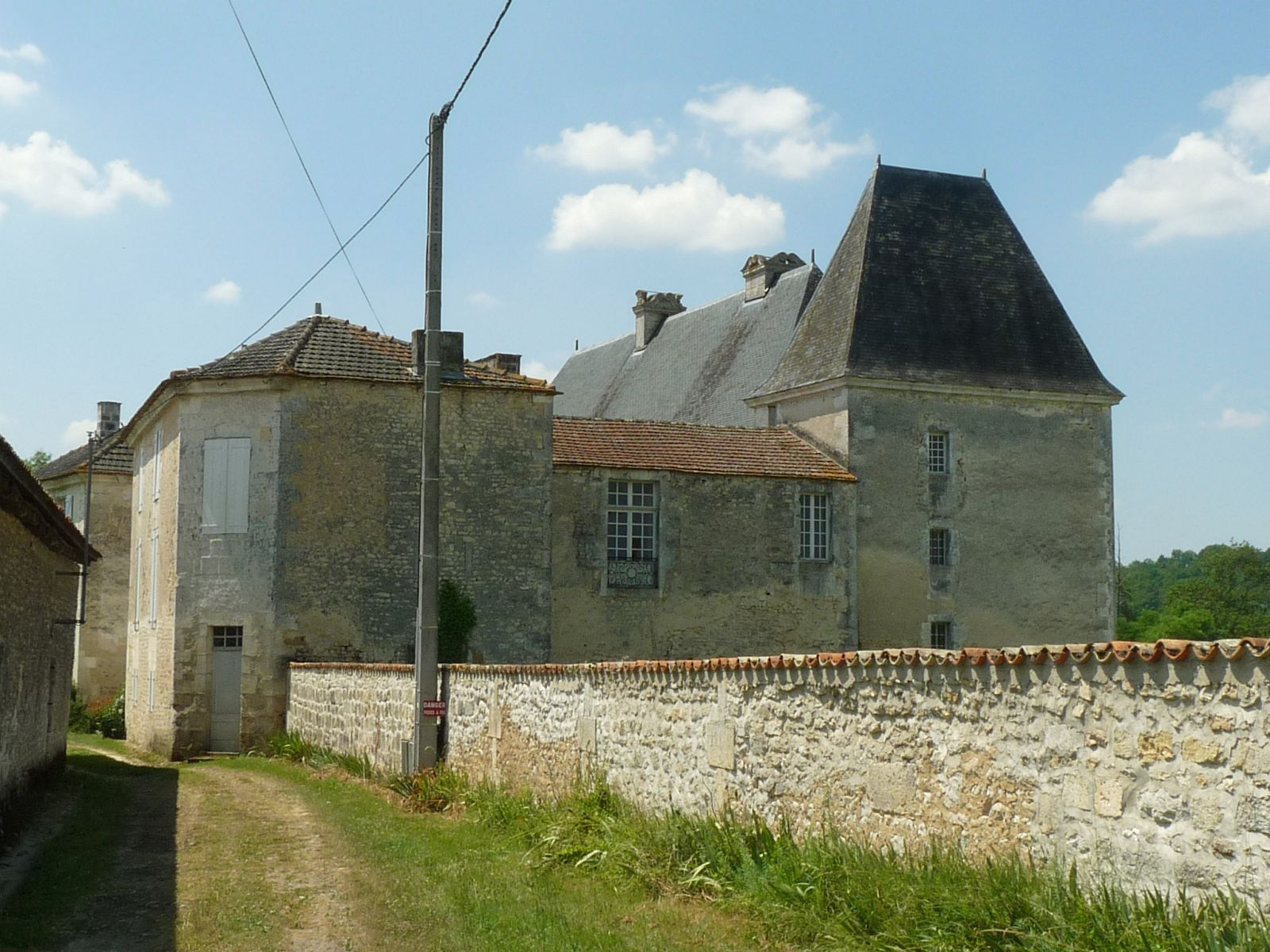
The Chateau

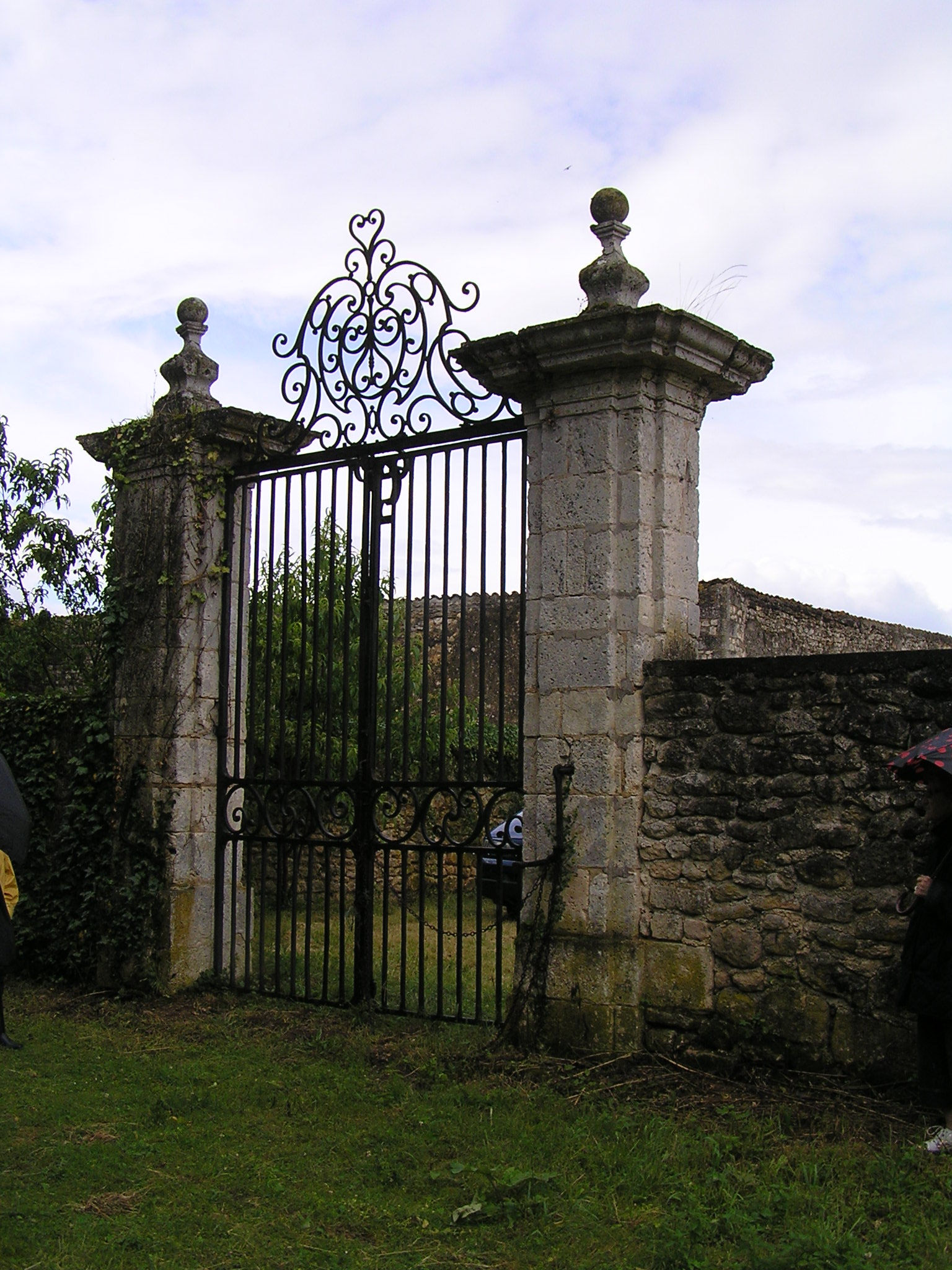
Gate at the Chateau entrance

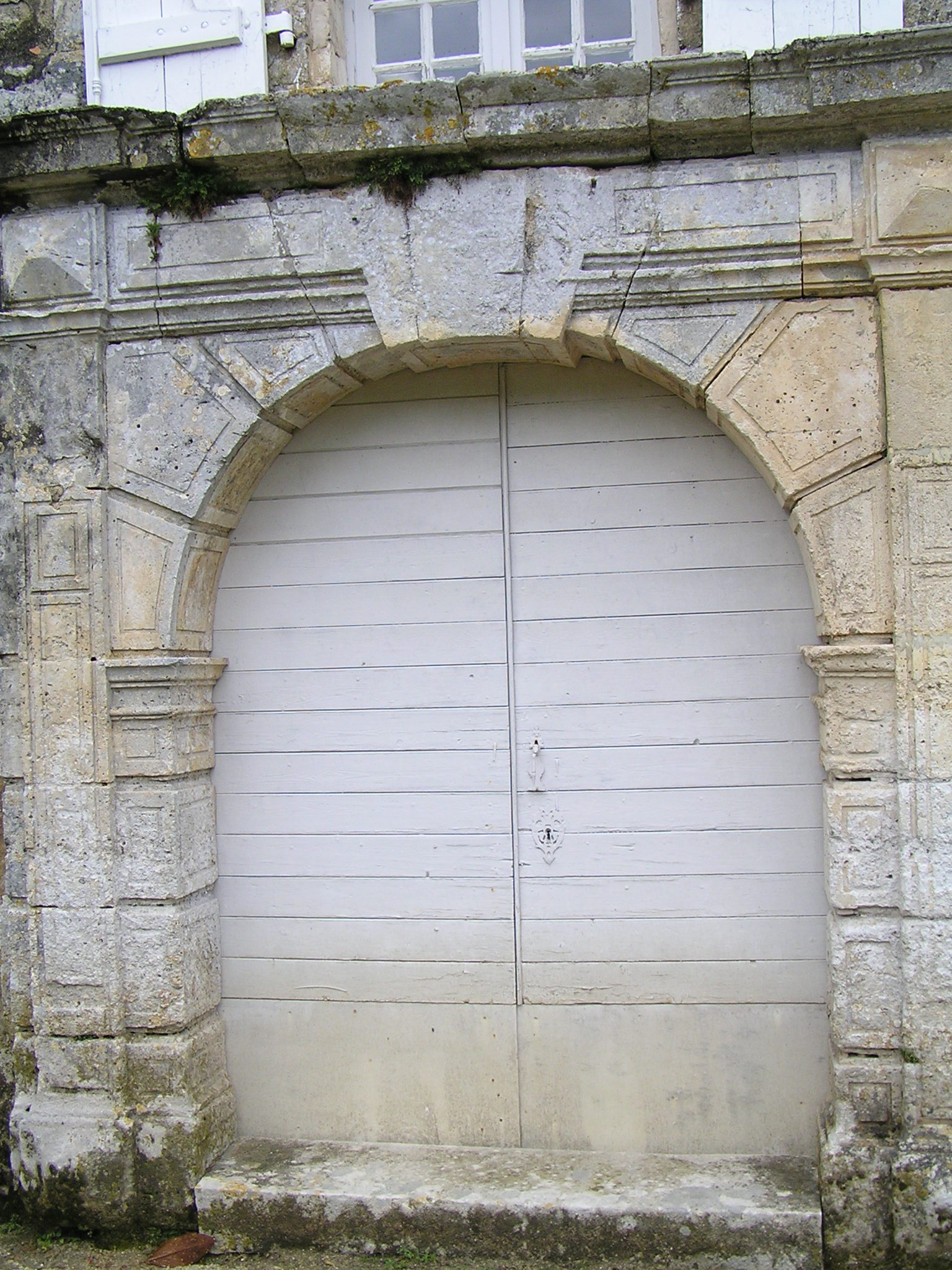
Entrance to the Chateau

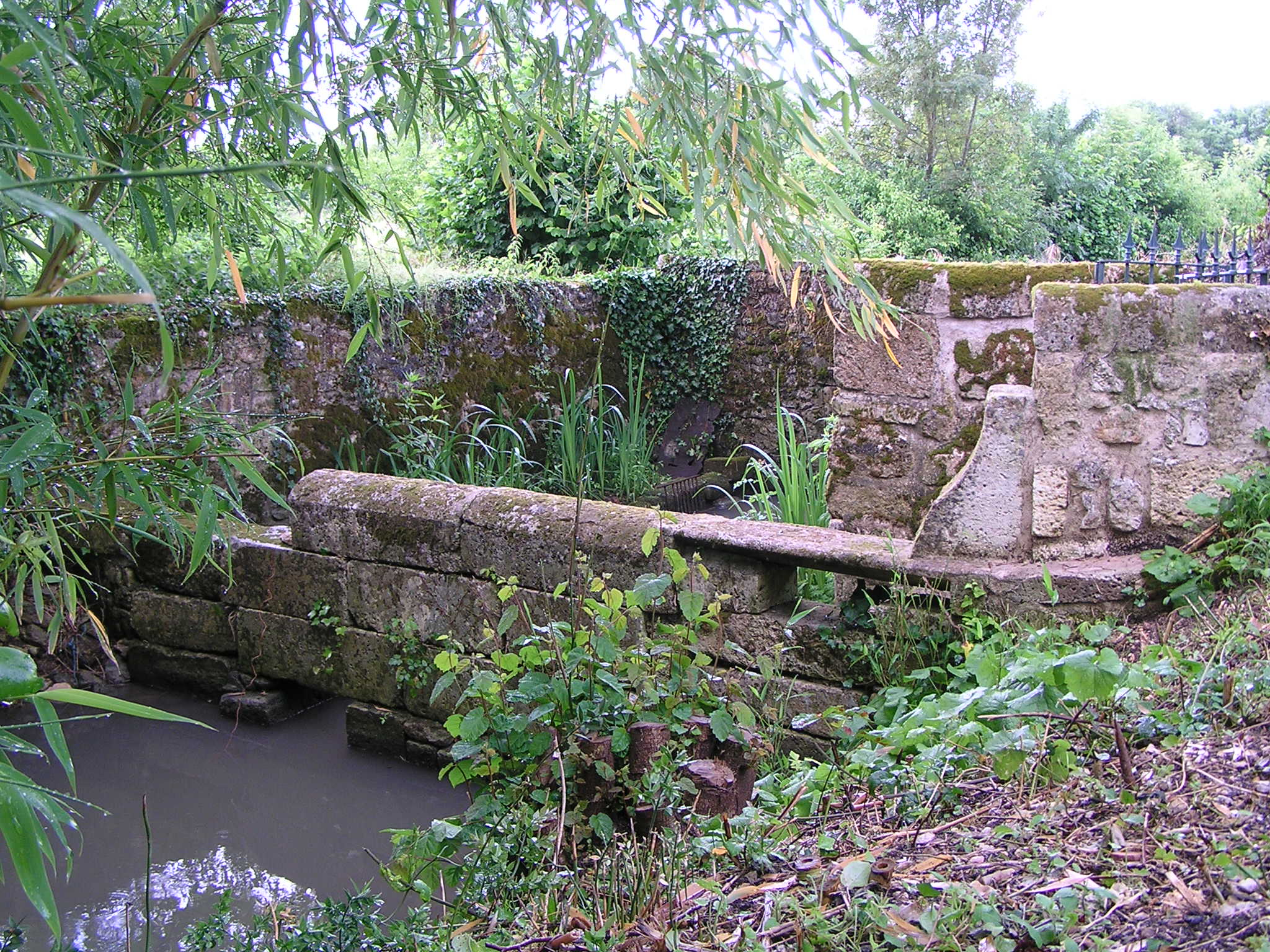
The Lavoir in the Chateau

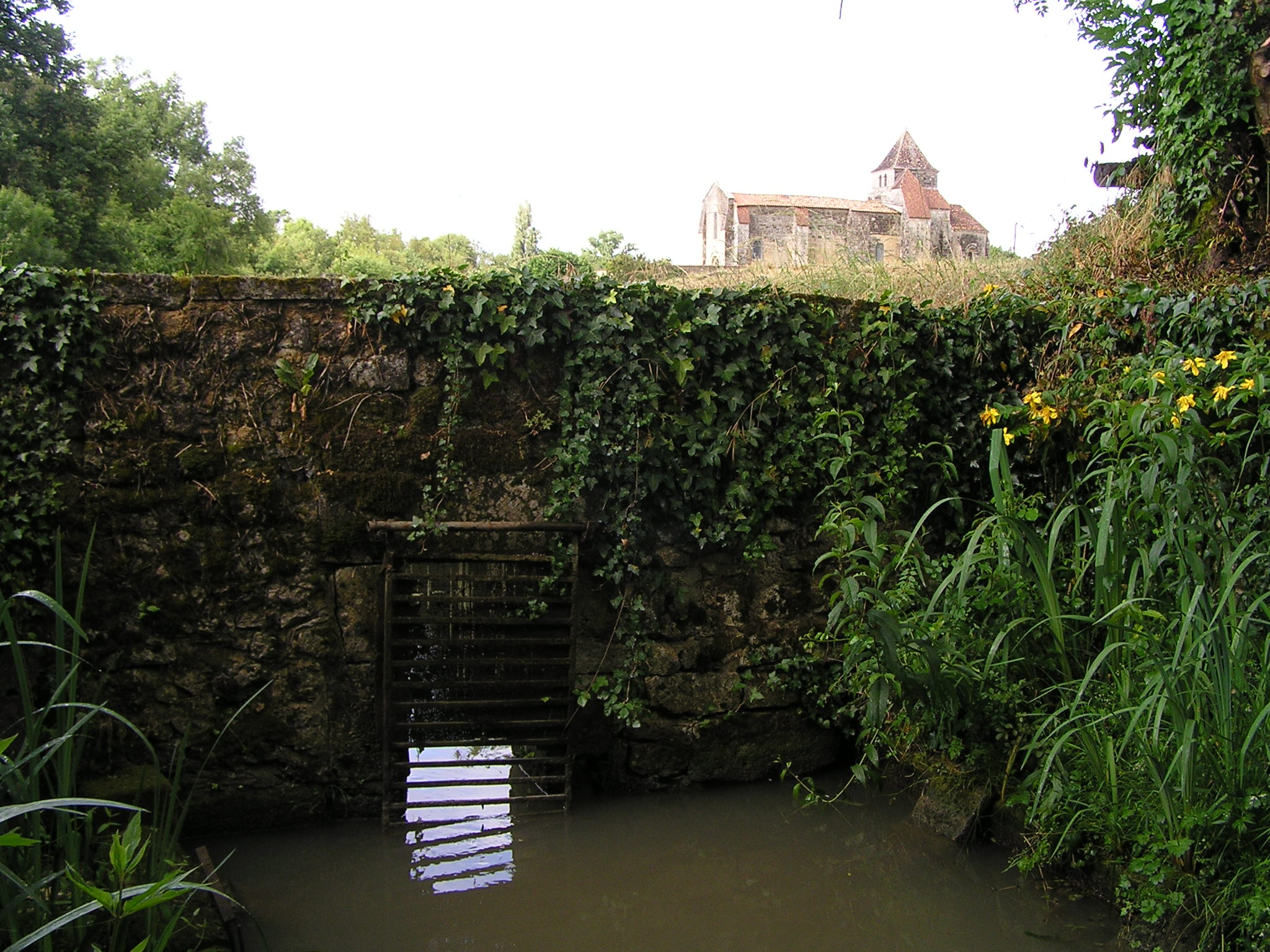
The fishpond

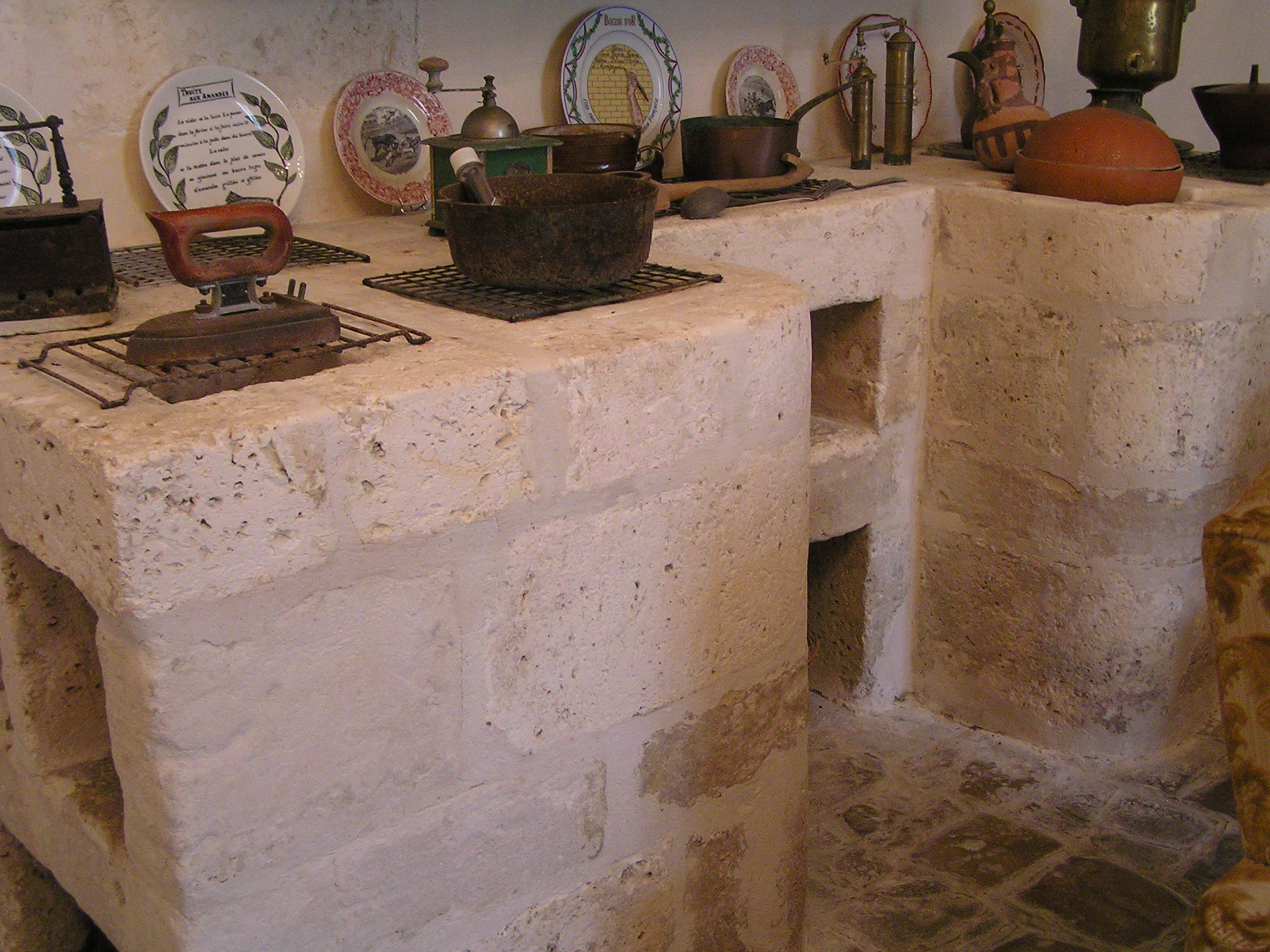
The kitchen in the Chateau

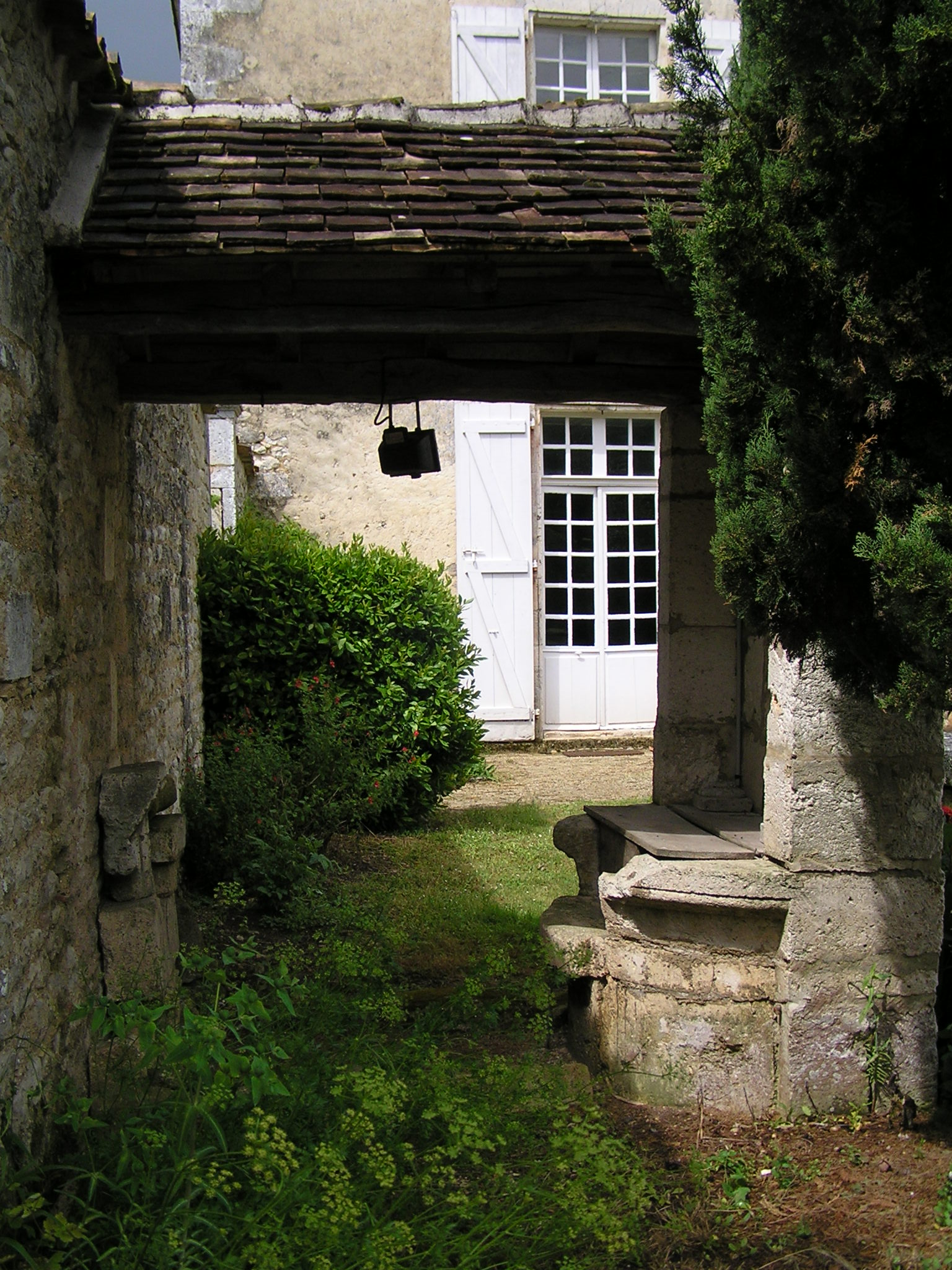
The well in front of the Chateau

== Notable people linked to the commune ==
- Jean-Louis Guez de Balzac (1597–1654), French writer, lived in the Château of Balzac.

== See also ==
- Communes of the Charente department
