= Château de Montignac =

Ruined castle in Charente, France

Coordinates: 45°47′4″N 0°7′26″E

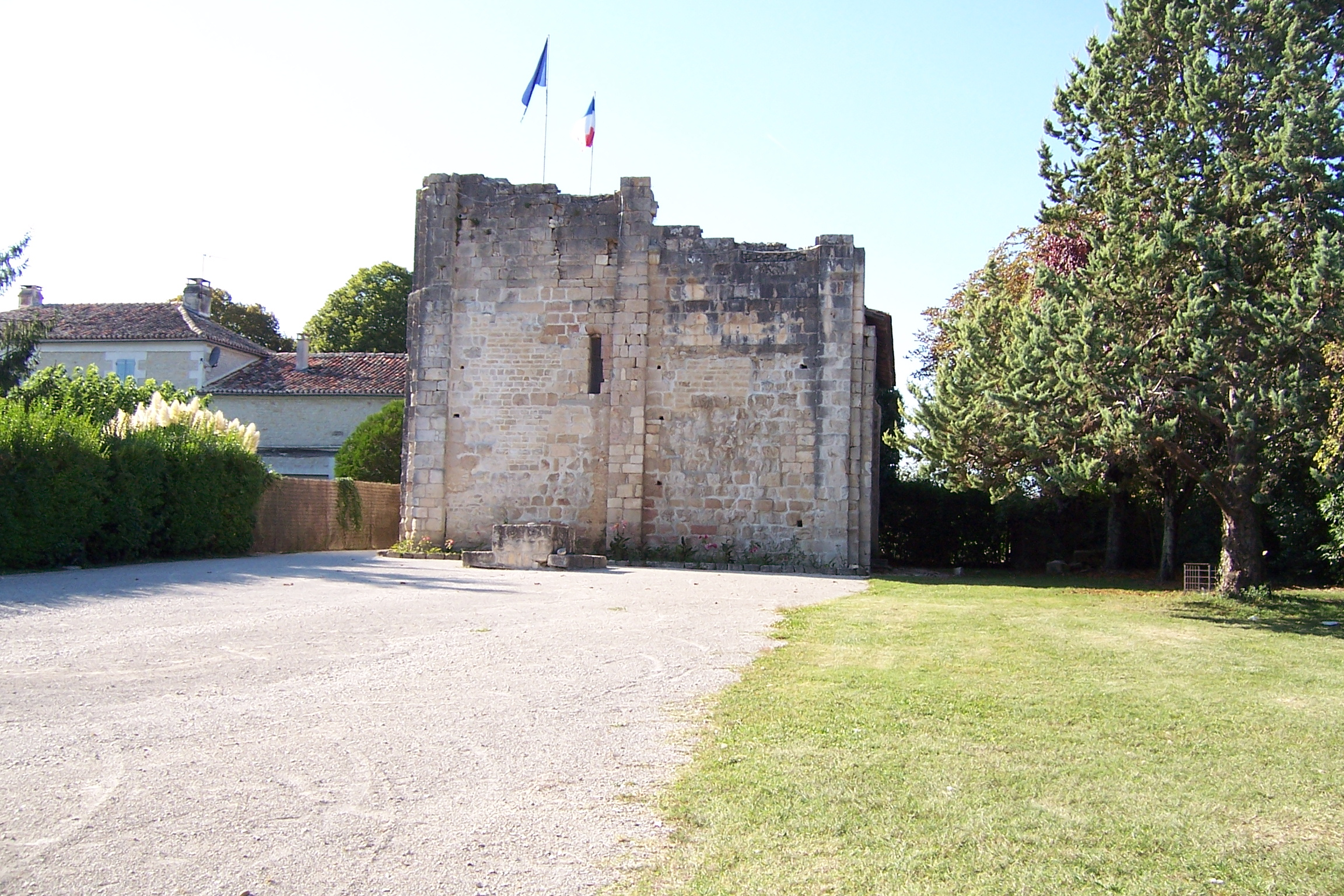
The keep of Montignac-Charente

The Château de Montignac is a ruined castle in the commune of Montignac-Charente, in the Charente département of France. The castle is the property of the commune and has been listed since 1962 as a monument historique by the French Ministry of Culture.

== History ==
A fortified camp existed at Montignac in the 9th century, during the Norman invasions. The castle is located at the crossroads of two important roads, the Via Agrippa from Saintes to Lyon where it crosses the Charente, and Via Chaussada from Périgueux to Poitiers.

The castle was built and rebuilt several times in the 12th and 13th centuries. It was then a fief of the bishop of Angoulême. William II of Angoulême obtained from the bishop of Angoulême, the fief and right to build a castle, with the stones of the Andone Castrum.

In the 12th century, ownership of the castle was disputed between Gerard de Blaye, helped by the lords of Saintonge and Poitou, and Vulgrain II of Angoulême, supported by the Duke of Aquitaine. The latter was able to resume building and in 1140 he built the square keep and the walled enclosure. The round towers dates to the 13th century. Renaud II, Lord of Pons, held the castle of Montignac, in the right of his wife Marguerite, lady of Montignac, the only child and heiress of Taleyrand, Lord of Montignac.

Montignac passed to the Lusignan family in 1218, when Hugh X of Lusignan asserted the right to the castle of his wife, Isabella, heiress of Angoulême. In 1243, he bequeathed the castle to his son, Guillaume de Lusignan.

In 1350, it was in the hands of Pierre II d'Amboise, viscount of Thouars, before being bought by the La Rochefoucauld family on 13 January 1399. Montignac became a barony in the 15th century and was preserved by the La Rochefoucaulds until the French Revolution. The remains of the castle were dismantled around 1840 and the chapel dedicated to Saint-Marie was destroyed between 1940 and 1950.

== Architecture ==
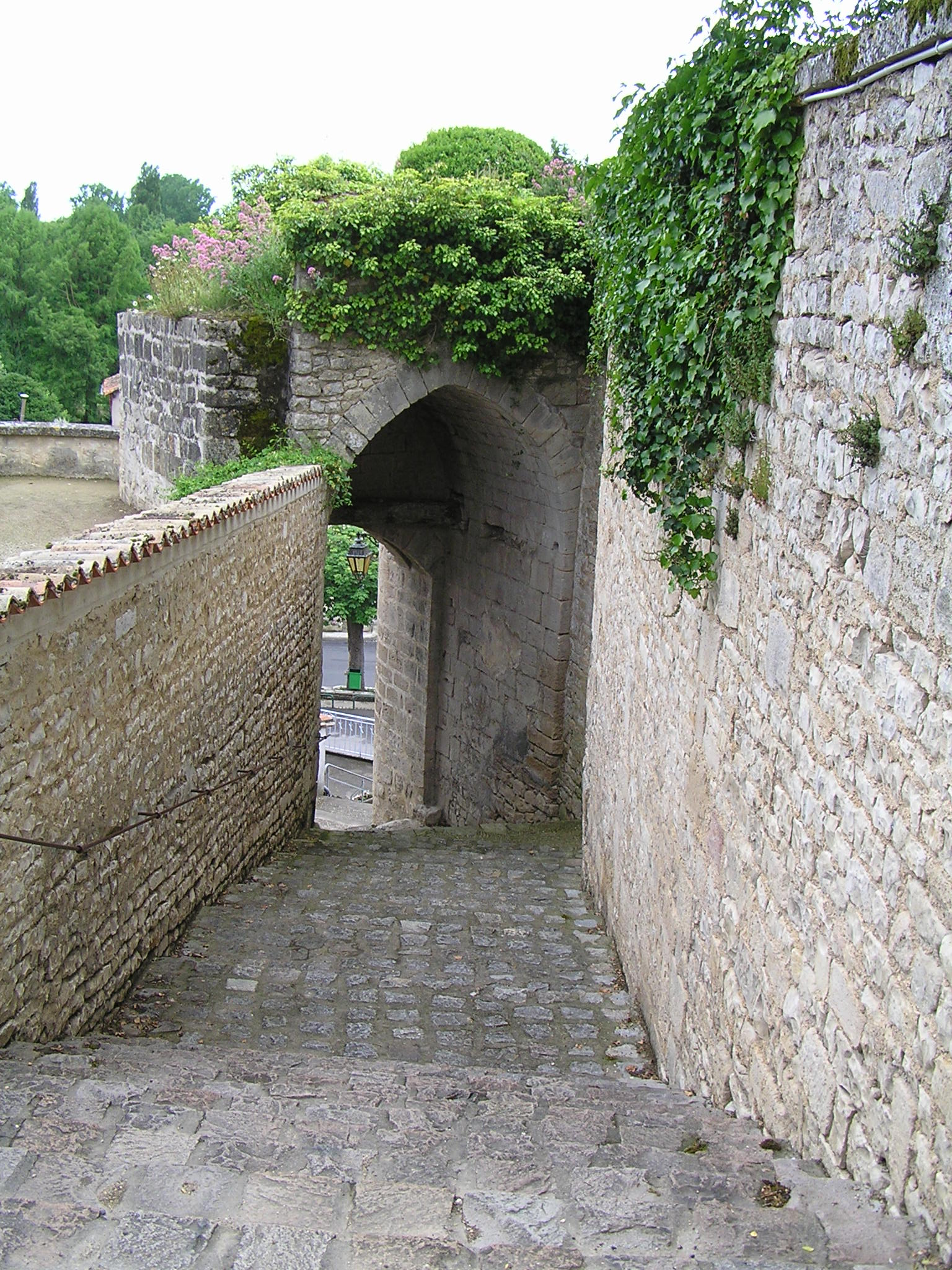
Inside the keep

Of the enceinte, there remain the gateway with a portcullis and two round towers on top of an escarpment, the western part of the enceinte and a round tower.

The present fairground corresponds to the lower courtyard.

A 13th-century watercolour shows that there were also two towers covered by "pepperpots".

The priory of Saint Étienne, dating from 1030, was demolished in 1960 and its stones were partly used to rebuild the keep. The latter forms an imposing structure from which the view extends across the valley of the Charente.

== See also ==
- List of castles in France
