= Gond-Pontouvre =

- Commune
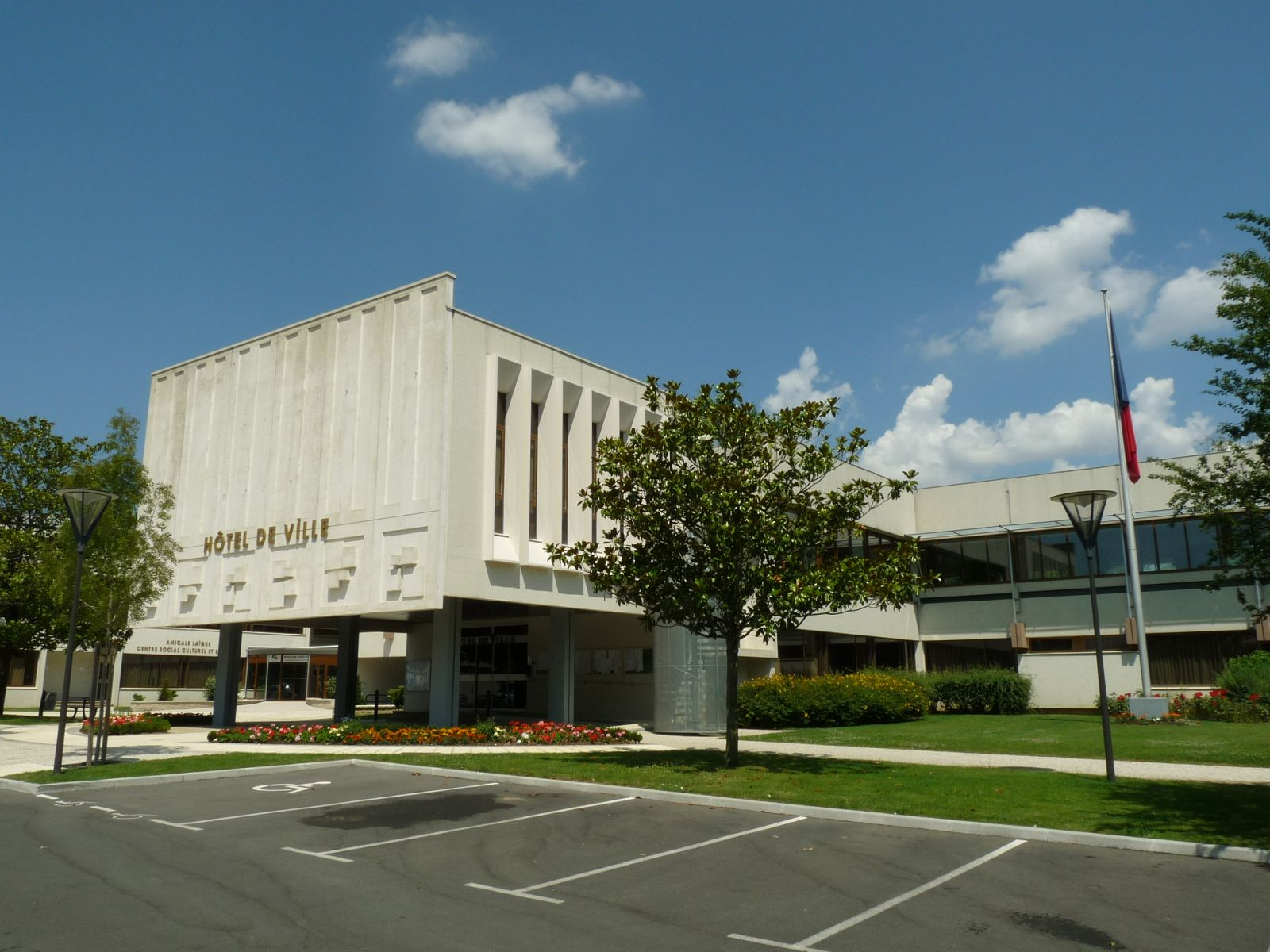
- The town hall in Gond-Pontouvre
- Location of Gond-Pontouvre
- Location within France Location within Nouvelle-Aquitaine
- Coordinates: 45°40′09″N 0°09′51″E
- Country: France
- Region: Nouvelle-Aquitaine
- Department: Charente
- Arrondissement: Angoulême
- Canton: Gond-Pontouvre
- Intercommunality: Grand Angoulême

Government
  - Mayor (2020–2026): Gérard Dezier
- Area^{1}: 7.45 km^{2} (2.88 sq mi)
- Highest elevation: 94 m (308 ft)
- Lowest elevation: 27 m (89 ft)
- Population (2023): 5,862
  - Density: 787/km^{2} (2,040/sq mi)
- Time zone: UTC+01:00 (CET)
  - Summer (DST): UTC+02:00 (CEST)
- INSEE/Postal code: 16154 /16160
- ^{1} French Land Register data, which excludes lakes, ponds, glaciers > 1 km^{2} (0.386 sq mi or 247 acres) and river estuaries.

Gond-Pontouvre (French pronunciation: [ɡɔ̃ pɔ̃tuvʁ]) is a commune in the Charente department in southwestern France. It is about 3 km north of the centre of Angoulême.

== Population ==
Historical population

| Year | Pop. | ±% p.a. |
|---|---|---|
| 1793 | 867 | — |
| 1800 | 905 | +0.61% |
| 1806 | 999 | +1.66% |
| 1821 | 1,110 | +0.70% |
| 1831 | 1,258 | +1.26% |
| 1841 | 1,392 | +1.02% |
| 1846 | 1,429 | +0.53% |
| 1851 | 1,503 | +1.01% |
| 1856 | 1,403 | −1.37% |
| 1861 | 1,744 | +4.45% |
| 1866 | 1,851 | +1.20% |
| 1872 | 1,828 | −0.21% |
| 1876 | 2,165 | +4.32% |
| 1881 | 2,357 | +1.71% |
| 1886 | 2,546 | +1.55% |
| 1891 | 2,567 | +0.16% |
| 1896 | 2,884 | +2.36% |
| 1901 | 2,958 | +0.51% |

| Year | Pop. | ±% p.a. |
|---|---|---|
| 1906 | 3,125 | +1.10% |
| 1911 | 3,363 | +1.48% |
| 1921 | 3,552 | +0.55% |
| 1926 | 3,685 | +0.74% |
| 1931 | 3,868 | +0.97% |
| 1936 | 4,136 | +1.35% |
| 1946 | 4,736 | +1.36% |
| 1954 | 5,032 | +0.76% |
| 1962 | 5,399 | +0.88% |
| 1968 | 5,426 | +0.08% |
| 1975 | 5,310 | −0.31% |
| 1982 | 6,286 | +2.44% |
| 1990 | 6,019 | −0.54% |
| 1999 | 5,971 | −0.09% |
| 2007 | 6,044 | +0.15% |
| 2012 | 5,892 | −0.51% |
| 2017 | 6,010 | +0.40% |
| 2023 | 5,862 | −0.41% |

Source: EHESS and INSEE (1968–2023)

== See also ==
- Communes of the Charente department
