= Andone Castrum =

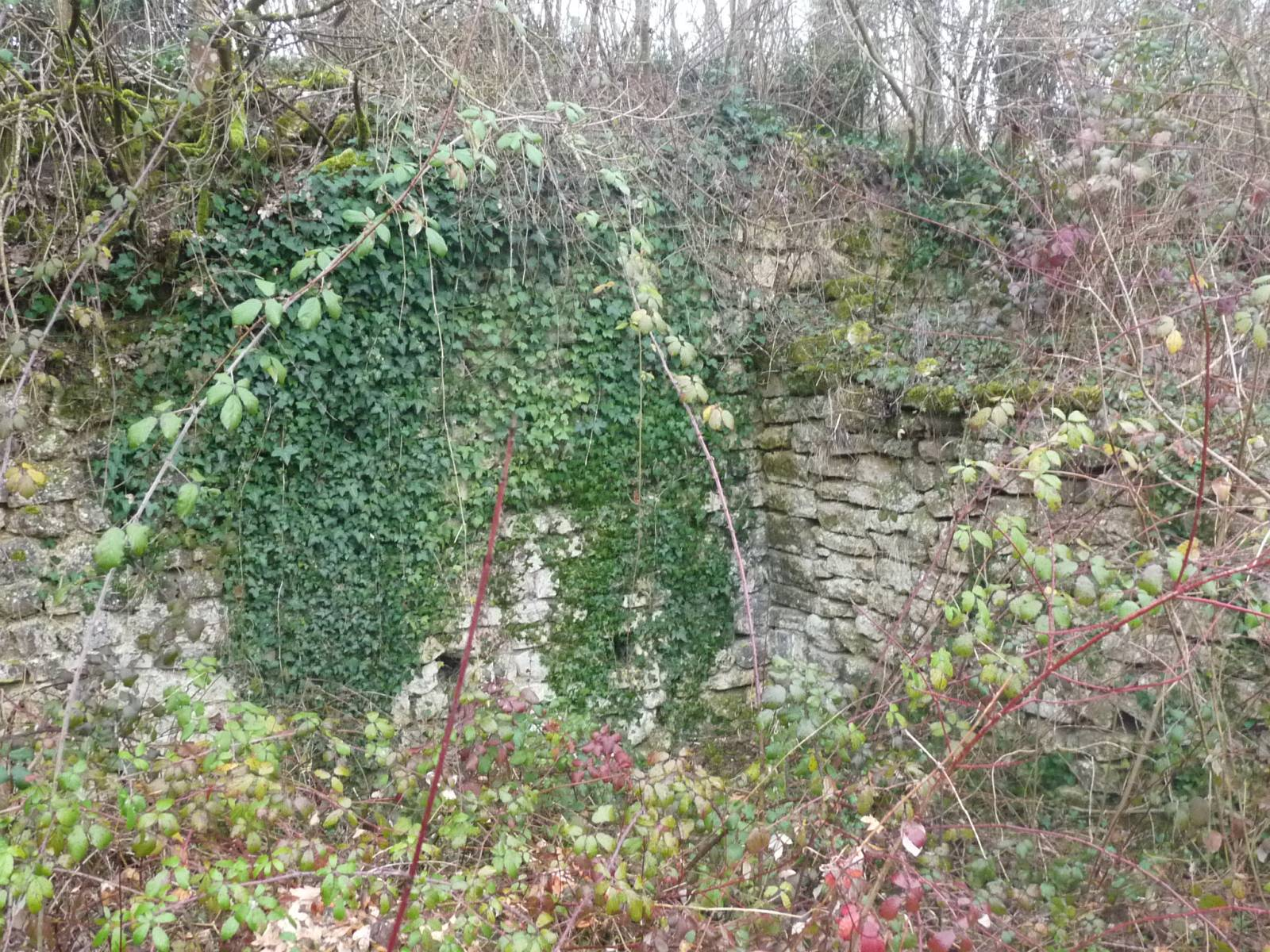
- Overgrown wall of the fort in 2010

- Location within France
- 45.79139°N 0.16472°E
- Periods: 10th – 11th centuries
- Location: Villejoubert, Charente, France

Site notes
- Height: 10 metres (33 ft)
- Area: 2 hectares (4.9 acres)
- Owner: Private

Designations
- Designation: Monument historique as of 13 August 1986

The Andone Castrum (French: Castrum d'Andone or d'Andonne) is a ruined fortification in Villejoubert, Charente, France. It dates from the 11th century.

== Location ==
The Andone (Note: The name Andone came into use in the 15th century. Older forms from the records of the abbey of Saint-Amant-de-Boixe around 1100 are Auzona and Anzona.) castrum was built in the medieval diocese of Angoulême. It is now 2 kilometres (1.2 mi) to the south of the Boixe forest, but in the 10th century the forest was much larger, and began no more than 1 kilometre (0.62 mi) away. It is about 3 kilometres (1.9 mi) to the east of Montignac on the Charente River, which meanders from north to south. It lay to the north of the great road from Saintes via Limoges to Lyon, which crossed the Charente at Montignac. The castrum is in an isolated location on a natural mound known as the "butte de la Garenne". The site was occupied by an Iron Age necropolis, and then by a Gallo-Roman villa. The villa was abandoned in the 4th century.

== History ==
Around 950 Angoulême went through a disturbed period as the Carolingian political structures disintegrated. Count Guillaume II Taillefer resigned his power as Count of Angoulême. around 945 and became a monk at the Abbey of Saint-Cybard. He left a bastard son, Arnaud Manzer, but was succeeded by his cousin, Count Bernard of Périgord. After Bernard's death in 962 there was a power struggle between Bernard's sons and Arnaud Manzer. Arnaud established himself of Count of Angoulême in 975. It seems that he reoccupied Andone during this period of struggle.

The site was most likely occupied from around 970–980 until 1028. The site may have been abandoned in part due to lacks of an interior water supply or to the cramped interior. More important, the transfer of the count's residence to Montignac, on the banks of the Charente, may have been due to the count's wish to ally himself to the bishop who controlled that area. The move seems to have taken place at the same time as the move of the monastery of Saint-Amant-de-Boixe, which had been close to Andone.

The site has been relatively undisturbed since being abandoned. Between 1971 and 1995 André Debord undertook an investigation of the castrum. His findings were reviewed, reinterpreted and published in 2009 under the direction of Luc Bourgeois. The excavation gives useful insights into daily life around the year 1000 in an aristocratic home. The fort has been classified Monument historique since 13 August 1986.

== Structure ==
The fortification was surrounded by a stone wall, around which there was a 1.5 metres (4 ft 11 in) walkway, then a large U-shape ditch up to 11.3 metres (37 ft) wide. It was thought by Debord that there may have been a second moat, but this has been shown to be incorrect. The surrounding woods contained oak, beech and maple, which were used indiscriminately for fuel. The woods had clearings for pasture or crops.

The stone wall was jointed with mortar, and may have had a walkway on top protected by a parapet. The wall was protected by an earth rampart on the outside. The irregular oval outline of the wall, in 14 juxtaposed sections, conforms to the shape of the hill. The remains of the wall are about 2 metres (6 ft 7 in) wide but rise no more than 4 metres (13 ft) above their foundations. They may have originally been 10 to 11 metres (33 to 36 ft) high. There were two gates, 2 to 3 metres (6 ft 7 in to 9 ft 10 in) wide, giving access to the enclosed space from the east and the west.

The enclosure was about 1,200 square metres (13,000 sq ft) in area and held seven stone buildings and two courts. In the northeast there was a long room connected to two others, which appears to have been the base of the ducal hall. There was no fireplace on the ground floor, so there may have been a second-floor room above, about 20 by 11 metres (66 by 36 ft). The ground level would have been a service area. In the south there were four buildings, of which three shared the same facade. The function of the smaller buildings to the south is not clear, but they may have been used for workshops, storage and for housing the count's staff. The stone construction is unusual, since most buildings of that period in France were of wood, other than the great royal residences.

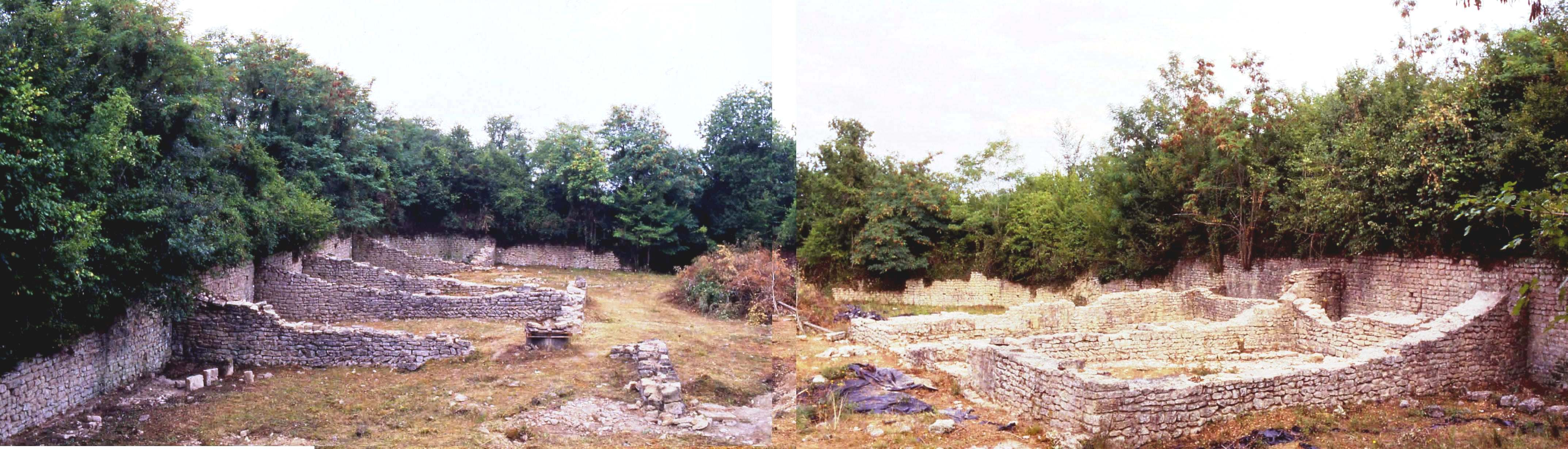
View from the east in 2004, ducal hall to the right

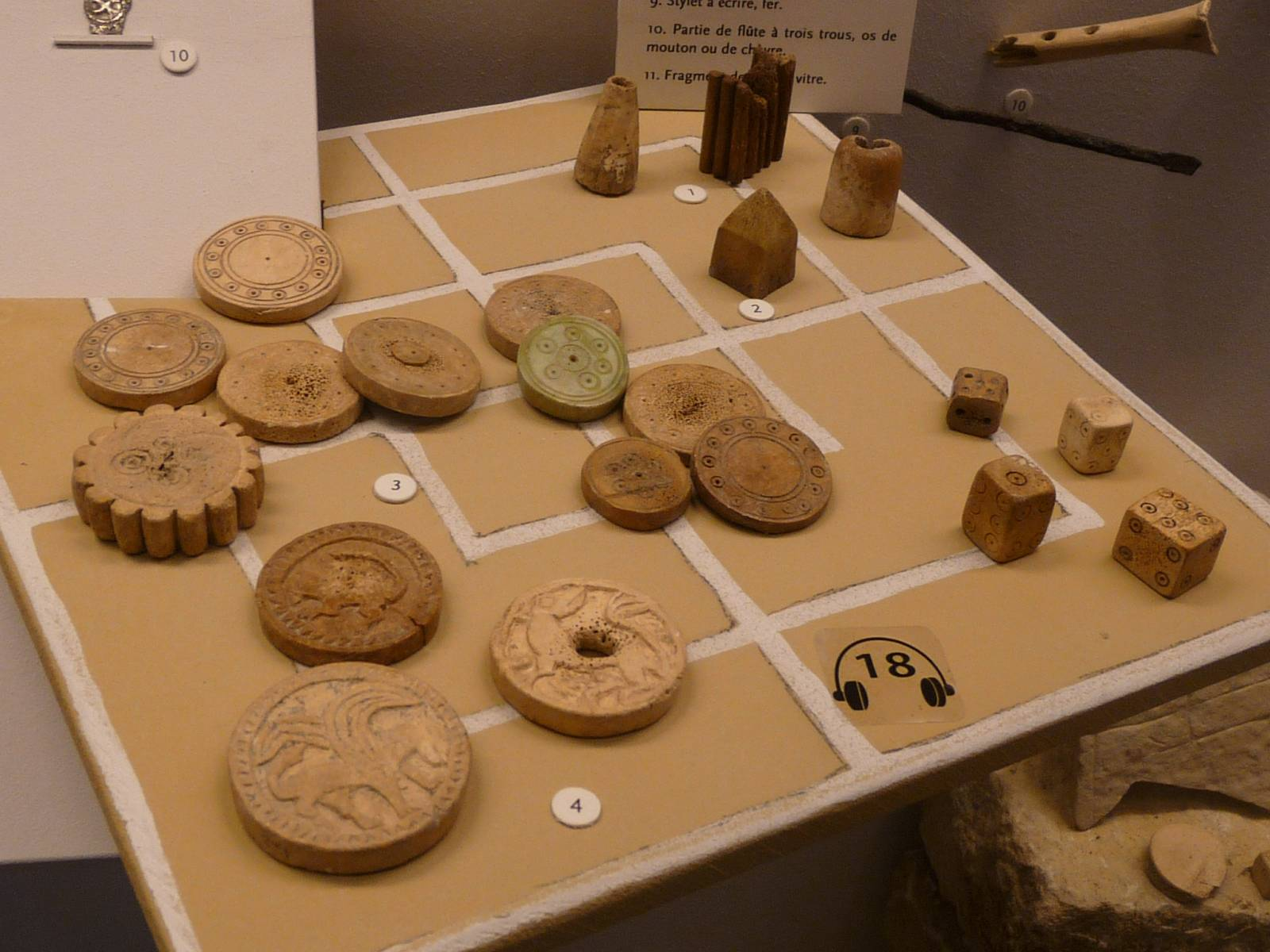
Game pieces, now preserved in the Musée d'Angoulême

== Lifestyle ==
Findings include coins, tools, weapons, many horse fittings, small glass vessels, flat glass plates, furniture of stone, bone and wood, ceramic vessels and small earthenware objects. There is evidence of weaving and a smithy, with abundant metal objects. These include ironwork from doors, furniture and chests. The weapons do not include swords or lances, and suggest hunting rather than combat. Locally made chess pieces give evidence of an aristocratic lifestyle.

80% of the domestic animals used for meat were pigs, the remainder being cattle and sheep. Wild game accounted for 4% of the total, including deer (63%), hare (20%), birds (10%) and wild boar (6%). The remains of four horses and seven donkeys were found, as well as a few bones of dog, squirrel, badger, cats and black rats, which were numerous.

== Sources ==
- Baudry, Marie-Pierre (2015). "Château fort, motte dit castrum d'Andone" (in French). Région Poitou-Charentes, Inventaire du patrimoine culturel.
- "Castrum d'Andonne". Mérimée (in French). Ministry of Culture.
- Debord, André (1984). "Les fouilles du castrum d'Andone" (PDF). Aquitania (in French). I. Bordeaux. Archived from the original (PDF) on 2016-03-04.
- Lodewijckx, Marc (1996-01-01). Archaeological and historical aspects of West-European societies: album amicorum André Van Doorselaer. Leuven University Press. ISBN 978-90-6186-722-7.
- Lorans, Elisabeth (2012). "Luc Bourgeois (dir.), Une résidence des comtes d'Angoulême autour de l'an Mil : le castrum d'Andone (Fouilles d'André Debord), Caen, Publications du CRAHM, 2009, 560 p". Revue archéologique du Centre de la France (in French). 51.
