= Saint-Yrieix-sur-Charente =

- Commune
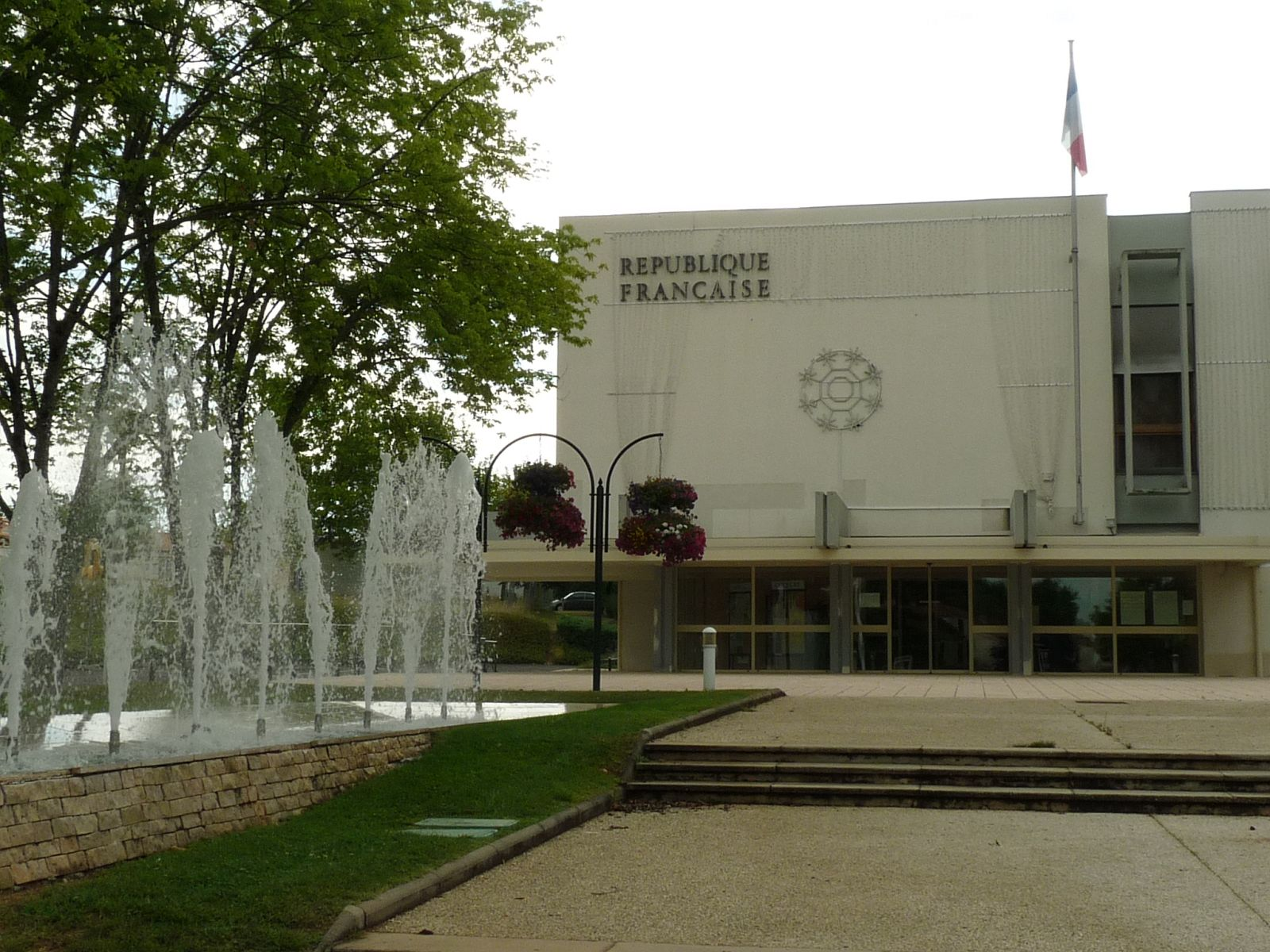
- Town hall

- Coat of arms
- Location of Saint-Yrieix-sur-Charente
- Location within France Location within Nouvelle-Aquitaine
- Coordinates: 45°40′33″N 0°07′41″E
- Country: France
- Region: Nouvelle-Aquitaine
- Department: Charente
- Arrondissement: Angoulême
- Canton: Gond-Pontouvre
- Intercommunality: Grand Angoulême

Government
  - Mayor (2020–2026): Jean-Jacques Fournié
- Area^{1}: 14.65 km^{2} (5.66 sq mi)
- Elevation: 175 m (574 ft)
- Highest elevation: 103 m (338 ft)
- Lowest elevation: 27 m (89 ft)
- Population (2023): 7,539
  - Density: 514.6/km^{2} (1,333/sq mi)
- Time zone: UTC+01:00 (CET)
  - Summer (DST): UTC+02:00 (CEST)
- INSEE/Postal code: 16358 /16710
- ^{1} French Land Register data, which excludes lakes, ponds, glaciers > 1 km^{2} (0.386 sq mi or 247 acres) and river estuaries.

Saint-Yrieix-sur-Charente (French pronunciation: [sɛ̃tiʁje syʁ ʃaʁɑ̃t]; Occitan: Sent Iriès de Charanta) is a commune in the Charente department, southwestern France.

== Population ==
Historical population

Year	Pop.	±% p.a.
1793	597	—
1800	698	+2.26%
1806	678	−0.48%
1821	776	+0.90%
1831	812	+0.45%
1841	804	−0.10%
1846	878	+1.78%
1851	841	−0.86%
1856	878	+0.86%
1861	916	+0.85%
1866	937	+0.45%
1872	918	−0.34%
1876	923	+0.14%
1881	1,178	+5.00%
1886	1,316	+2.24%
1891	1,500	+2.65%
1896	1,471	−0.39%
1901	1,577	+1.40%

Year	Pop.	±% p.a.
1906	1,705	+1.57%
1911	1,817	+1.28%
1921	1,827	+0.05%
1926	1,873	+0.50%
1931	2,018	+1.50%
1936	2,206	+1.80%
1946	2,749	+2.22%
1954	2,907	+0.70%
1962	3,078	+0.72%
1968	3,531	+2.31%
1975	4,035	+1.92%
1982	5,317	+4.02%
1990	6,436	+2.42%
1999	6,373	−0.11%
2007	6,960	+1.11%
2012	7,124	+0.47%
2017	7,274	+0.42%
2023	7,539	+0.60%

Source: EHESS and INSEE (1968-2023)

== See also ==
- Communes of the Charente department
