= Canton of Gond-Pontouvre =

Coordinates: 45.68°N 0.16°E

- Canton
- Situation of the canton of Gond-Pontouvre in the department of Charente
- Country: France
- Region: Nouvelle-Aquitaine
- Department: Charente
- No. of communes: {{{nbcomm}}}
- Population (2023): 20,092
- INSEE code: 1614

The canton of Gond-Pontouvre is an administrative division of the Charente department, southwestern France. Its borders were not modified at the French canton reorganisation which came into effect in March 2015. Its seat is in Gond-Pontouvre.

It consists of the following communes:

1. Balzac
2. Champniers
3. Gond-Pontouvre
4. Saint-Yrieix-sur-Charente
