= La Boixe =

- Commune
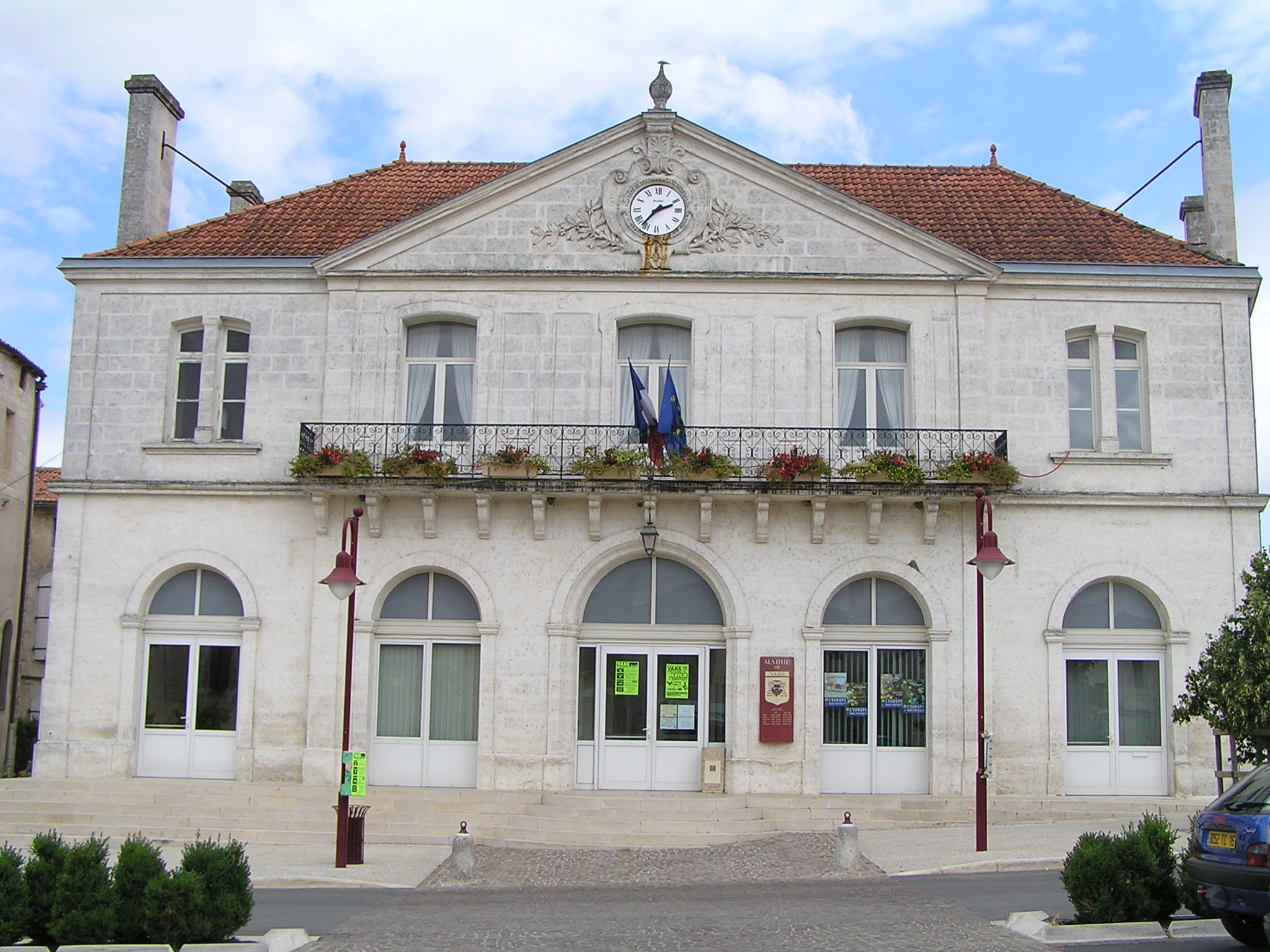
- Town hall in Vars
- Location of La Boixe
- Location within France Location within Nouvelle-Aquitaine
- Coordinates: 45°45′47″N 0°07′29″E
- Country: France
- Region: Nouvelle-Aquitaine
- Department: Charente
- Arrondissement: Confolens
- Canton: Boixe-et-Manslois
- Intercommunality: CC Cœur de Charente

Government
  - Mayor (2025–2026): Jean-Marc de Lustrac
- Area^{1}: 36.09 km^{2} (13.93 sq mi)
- Highest elevation: 153 m (502 ft)
- Lowest elevation: 35 m (115 ft)
- Population (2023): 2,841
  - Density: 78.72/km^{2} (203.9/sq mi)
- Time zone: UTC+01:00 (CET)
  - Summer (DST): UTC+02:00 (CEST)
- INSEE/Postal code: 16393 /16330
- ^{1} French Land Register data, which excludes lakes, ponds, glaciers > 1 km^{2} (0.386 sq mi or 247 acres) and river estuaries.

La Boixe (French pronunciation: [la bwaks]) is a commune in the Charente department in southwestern France. It was formed on 1 January 2025, with the merger of Vars and Montignac-Charente.

== Population ==
Population data refer to the commune in its geography as of January 2025.

Historical population
Year	Pop.	±% p.a.
1968	1,914	—
1975	2,049	+0.98%
1982	2,323	+1.81%
1990	2,220	−0.57%
1999	2,268	+0.24%
2007	2,655	+1.99%
2012	2,686	+0.23%
2017	2,809	+0.90%
2023	2,841	+0.19%
Source: INSEE

== See also ==
- Communes of the Charente department
