= Champniers, Charente =

Champniers
- Commune
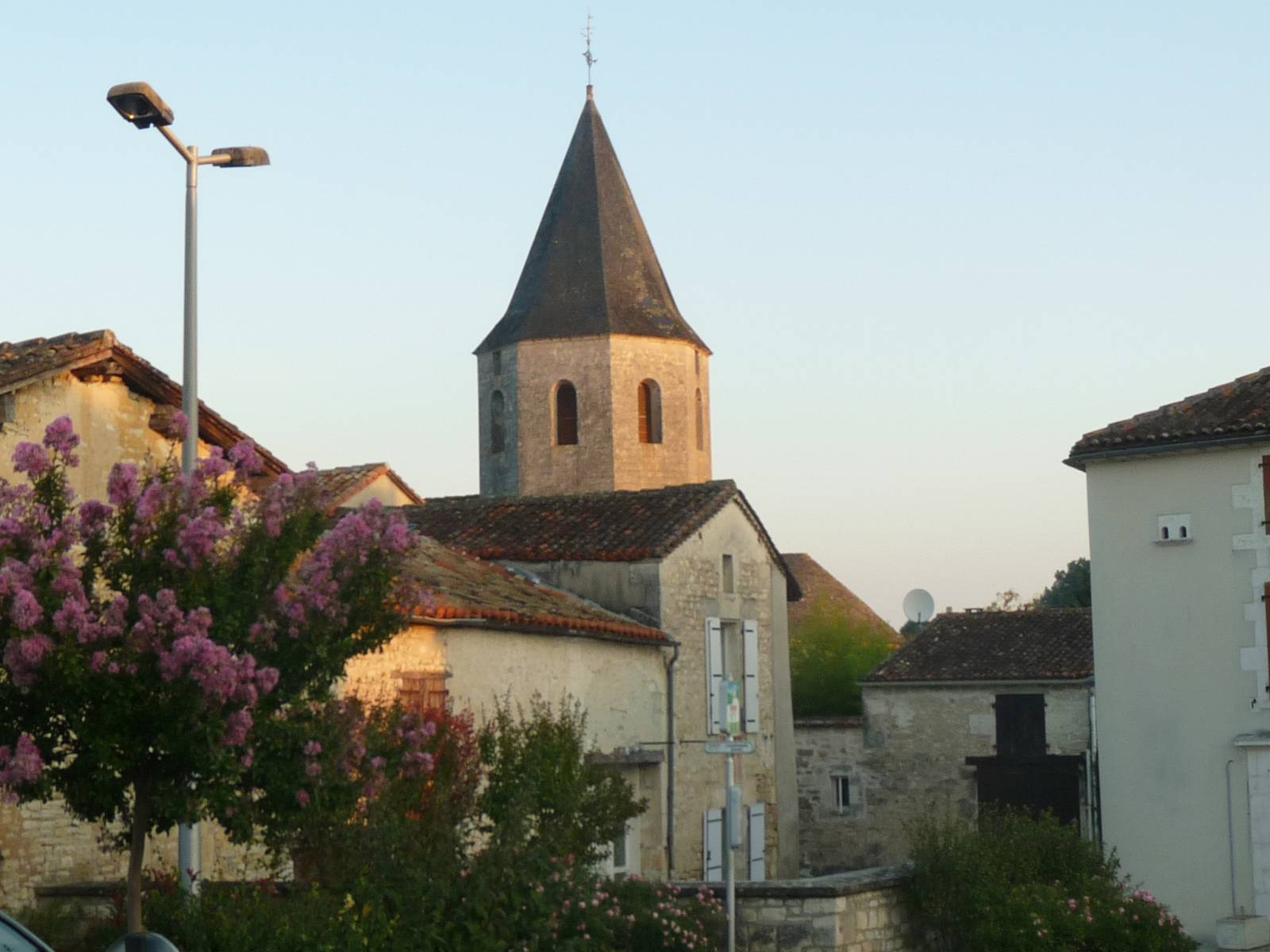
- The church in Champniers

- Coat of arms
- Location of Champniers
- Location within France Location within Nouvelle-Aquitaine
- Coordinates: 45°42′57″N 0°12′23″E
- Country: France
- Region: Nouvelle-Aquitaine
- Department: Charente
- Arrondissement: Angoulême
- Canton: Gond-Pontouvre
- Intercommunality: CA Grand Angoulême

Government
  - Mayor (2020–2026): Michaël Laville
- Area^{1}: 45.29 km^{2} (17.49 sq mi)
- Elevation: 112 m (367 ft)
- Highest elevation: 163 m (535 ft)
- Lowest elevation: 31 m (102 ft)
- Population (2023): 5,281
  - Density: 116.6/km^{2} (302.0/sq mi)
- Time zone: UTC+01:00 (CET)
  - Summer (DST): UTC+02:00 (CEST)
- INSEE/Postal code: 16078 /16430
- ^{1} French Land Register data, which excludes lakes, ponds, glaciers > 1 km^{2} (0.386 sq mi or 247 acres) and river estuaries.

Champniers (French pronunciation: [ʃɑ̃pnje] or [ʃɑ̃nje]) is a commune in the Charente department in southwestern France.

== Population ==
Historical population

Year	Pop.	±% p.a.
1793	3,879	—
1800	4,233	+1.26%
1806	4,404	+0.66%
1821	4,132	−0.42%
1831	4,554	+0.98%
1841	4,062	−1.14%
1846	4,128	+0.32%
1851	4,102	−0.13%
1856	3,848	−1.27%
1861	3,648	−1.06%
1866	3,560	−0.49%
1872	3,388	−0.82%
1876	3,362	−0.19%
1881	3,255	−0.64%
1886	2,934	−2.06%
1891	2,846	−0.61%
1896	2,730	−0.83%
1901	2,719	−0.08%

Year	Pop.	±% p.a.
1906	2,595	−0.93%
1911	2,626	+0.24%
1921	2,337	−1.16%
1926	2,313	−0.21%
1931	2,333	+0.17%
1936	2,431	+0.83%
1946	2,277	−0.65%
1954	2,383	+0.57%
1962	2,613	+1.16%
1968	2,762	+0.93%
1975	3,493	+3.41%
1982	4,094	+2.29%
1990	4,358	+0.78%
1999	4,604	+0.61%
2007	5,001	+1.04%
2012	5,171	+0.67%
2017	5,151	−0.08%
2023	5,281	+0.42%

Source: EHESS and INSEE (1968-2023)

== See also ==
- Communes of the Charente department
