= Vars, Charente =

Vars
- Part of La Boixe
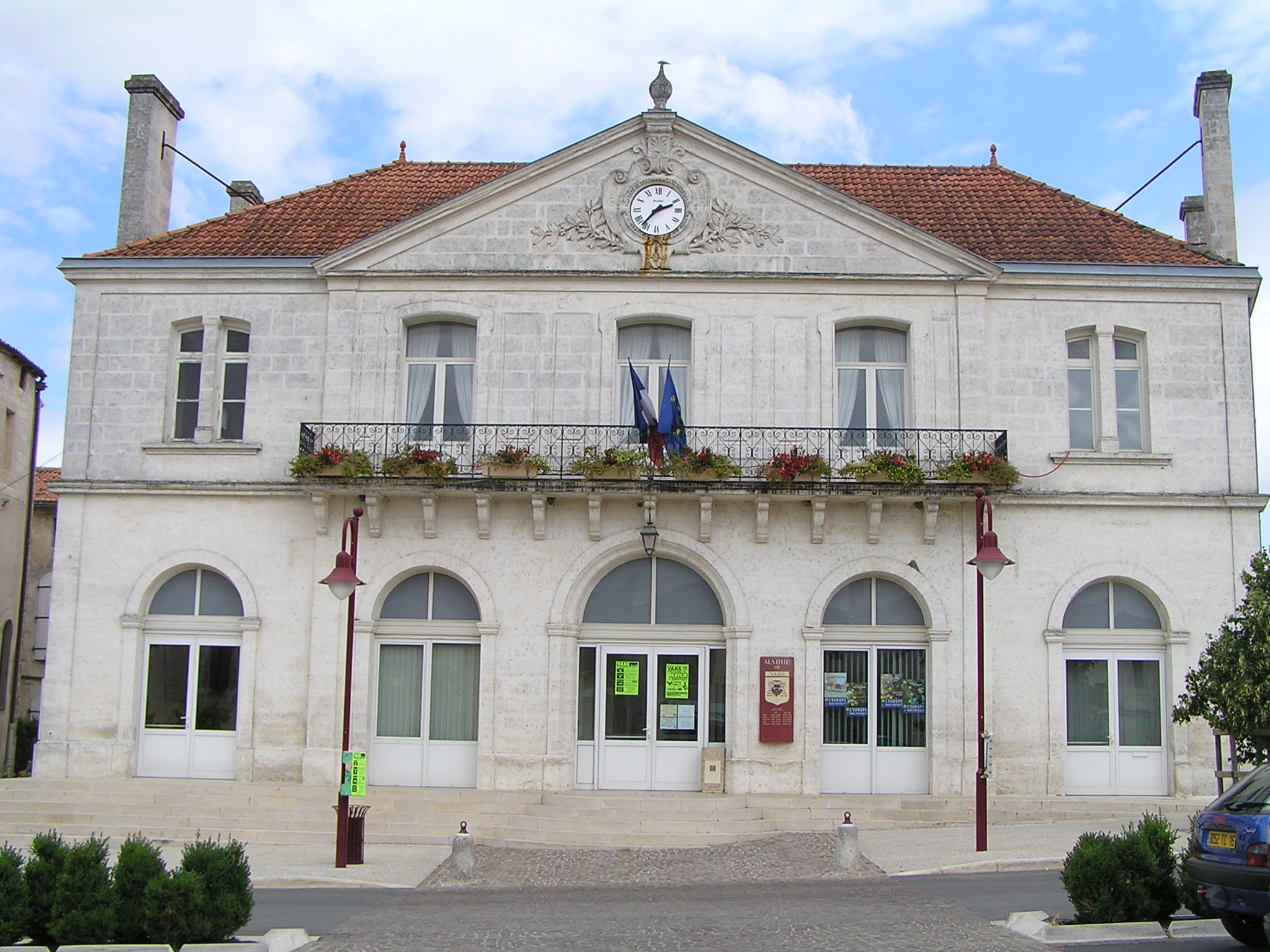
- Town hall

- Coat of arms
- Location of Vars
- Location within France Location within Nouvelle-Aquitaine
- Coordinates: 45°45′47″N 0°07′29″E
- Country: France
- Region: Nouvelle-Aquitaine
- Department: Charente
- Arrondissement: Confolens
- Canton: Boixe-et-Manslois
- Commune: La Boixe
- Area^{1}: 27.46 km^{2} (10.60 sq mi)
- Elevation: 42 m (138 ft)
- Highest elevation: 153 m (502 ft)
- Lowest elevation: 35 m (115 ft)
- Population (2022): 2,163
  - Density: 78.77/km^{2} (204.0/sq mi)
- Time zone: UTC+01:00 (CET)
  - Summer (DST): UTC+02:00 (CEST)
- Postal code: 16330
- ^{1} French Land Register data, which excludes lakes, ponds, glaciers > 1 km^{2} (0.386 sq mi or 247 acres) and river estuaries.

Vars (French pronunciation: [vaʁs]) is a former commune in the Charente department in southwestern France. It was merged with Montignac-Charente to form La Boixe on 1 January 2025.

== Population ==
Historical population

Year	Pop.	±% p.a.
1793	1,689	—
1800	1,858	+1.37%
1806	1,796	−0.56%
1821	1,978	+0.65%
1831	1,987	+0.05%
1841	2,035	+0.24%
1846	1,941	−0.94%
1851	2,076	+1.35%
1856	1,869	−2.08%
1861	1,903	+0.36%
1866	2,011	+1.11%
1872	1,948	−0.53%
1876	1,948	+0.00%
1881	1,934	−0.14%
1886	1,713	−2.40%
1891	1,561	−1.84%
1896	1,551	−0.13%
1901	1,570	+0.24%

Year	Pop.	±% p.a.
1906	1,557	−0.17%
1911	1,408	−1.99%
1921	1,157	−1.94%
1926	1,225	+1.15%
1931	1,166	−0.98%
1936	1,202	+0.61%
1946	1,178	−0.20%
1954	1,092	−0.94%
1962	1,089	−0.03%
1968	1,306	+3.07%
1975	1,340	+0.37%
1982	1,551	+2.11%
1990	1,511	−0.33%
1999	1,567	+0.41%
2007	1,892	+2.38%
2012	1,985	+0.96%
2017	2,081	+0.95%

Source: EHESS and INSEE (1968-2017)

== See also ==
- Communes of the Charente department
