= Montignac-Charente =

- Part of La Boixe
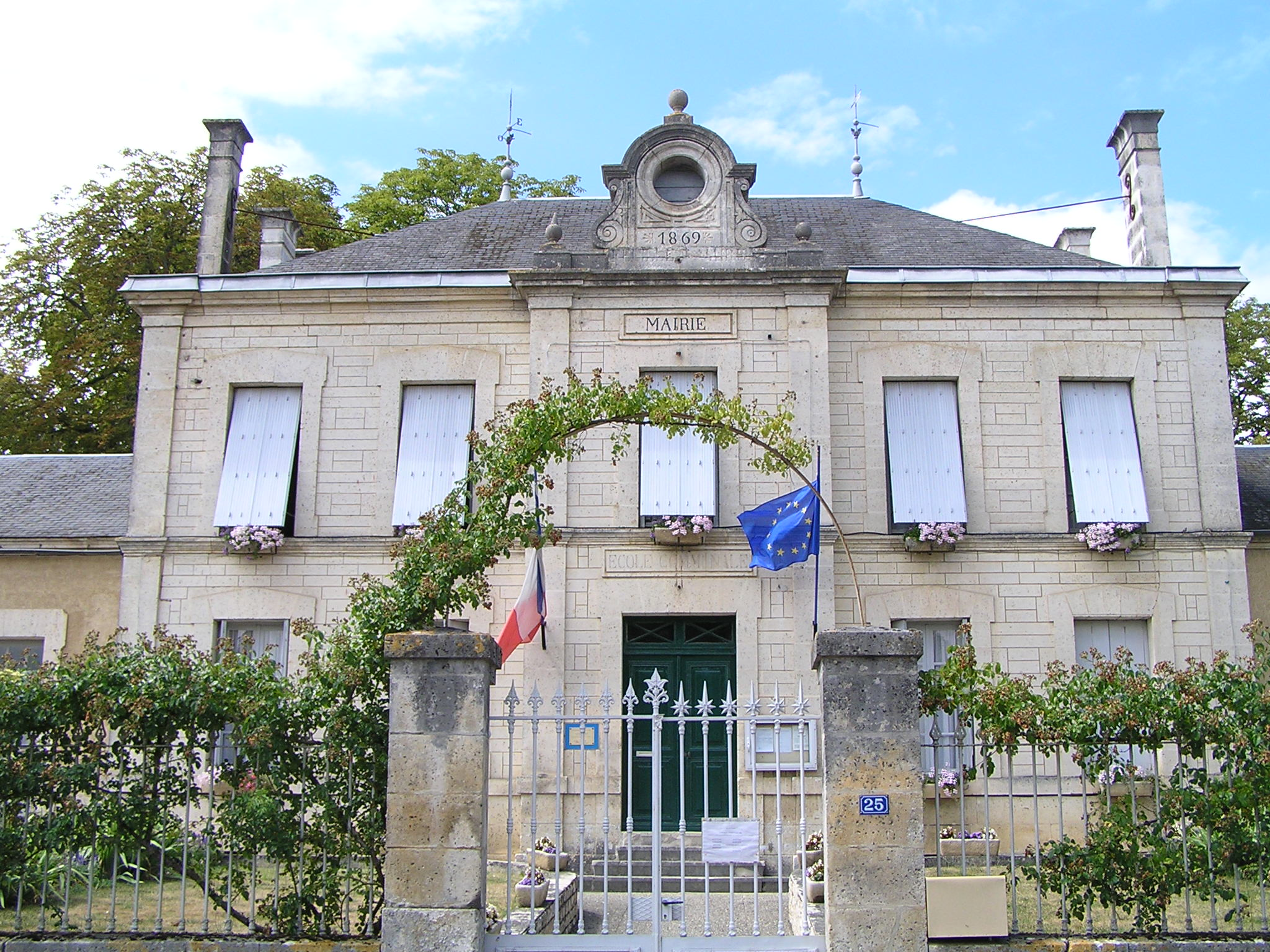
- Town hall

- Coat of arms
- Location of Montignac-Charente
- Location within France Location within Nouvelle-Aquitaine
- Coordinates: 45°47′03″N 0°07′32″E
- Country: France
- Region: Nouvelle-Aquitaine
- Department: Charente
- Arrondissement: Confolens
- Canton: Boixe-et-Manslois
- Commune: La Boixe
- Area^{1}: 8.63 km^{2} (3.33 sq mi)
- Elevation: 42 m (138 ft)
- Highest elevation: 90 m (300 ft)
- Lowest elevation: 39 m (128 ft)
- Population (2022): 699
  - Density: 81.0/km^{2} (210/sq mi)
- Time zone: UTC+01:00 (CET)
  - Summer (DST): UTC+02:00 (CEST)
- Postal code: 16330
- ^{1} French Land Register data, which excludes lakes, ponds, glaciers > 1 km^{2} (0.386 sq mi or 247 acres) and river estuaries.

Montignac-Charente (French pronunciation: [mɔ̃tiɲak ʃaʁɑ̃t]) is a former commune in the Charente department in southwestern France. It was merged with Vars to form La Boixe on 1 January 2025.

== Population ==
Historical population
| Year | Pop. | ±% p.a. |
|---|---|---|
| 1968 | 608 | — |
| 1975 | 709 | +2.22% |
| 1982 | 772 | +1.22% |
| 1990 | 709 | −1.06% |
| 1999 | 701 | −0.13% |
| 2009 | 731 | +0.42% |
| 2014 | 712 | −0.53% |
| 2020 | 712 | +0.00% |
Source: INSEE

== Sights and monuments ==
- Château de Montignac - keep and remains of an 11th-13th century castle, listed since 1962 as a monument historique by the Ministry of Culture.
- The bronze bell in the parish church of Notre-Dame weighs 200 kg and dates from 1666 and has been classified by the French Ministry of Culture as a monument historique since 1944. It is engraved:

SANCTA+MARIA+ORA+PRO+NOBIS+ME+FRANÇOIS CAZIER+PRETRE+CURE+DE L'EGLISE+DE+NOSTRE+DAME+DE+MONTIGNAC+CHARANTE+PARRIN+TRES+HAUT+TRES PUISSANT+ET+TRES ILLUSTRE+MESSIRE CHARLES+DUC DE LA ROCHEFOUCAULD+PAIR+DE+FRANCE+MARRINE+TRES HAUTE+ET+TRES PUISSANTE DAME AGNES+DUPLESSIS+DE+LEANCOURT+PRINCESSE+DE+MARSILLAC FABRICEURS+MES+CHARLES+THINON+ET PIERRE+PAPPOT
P.CHARPENTIER M'A FONDU EN 1666.

== See also ==
- Communes of the Charente department
