= Roman Road from Saintes to Périgueux =

Roman ancient roads in France

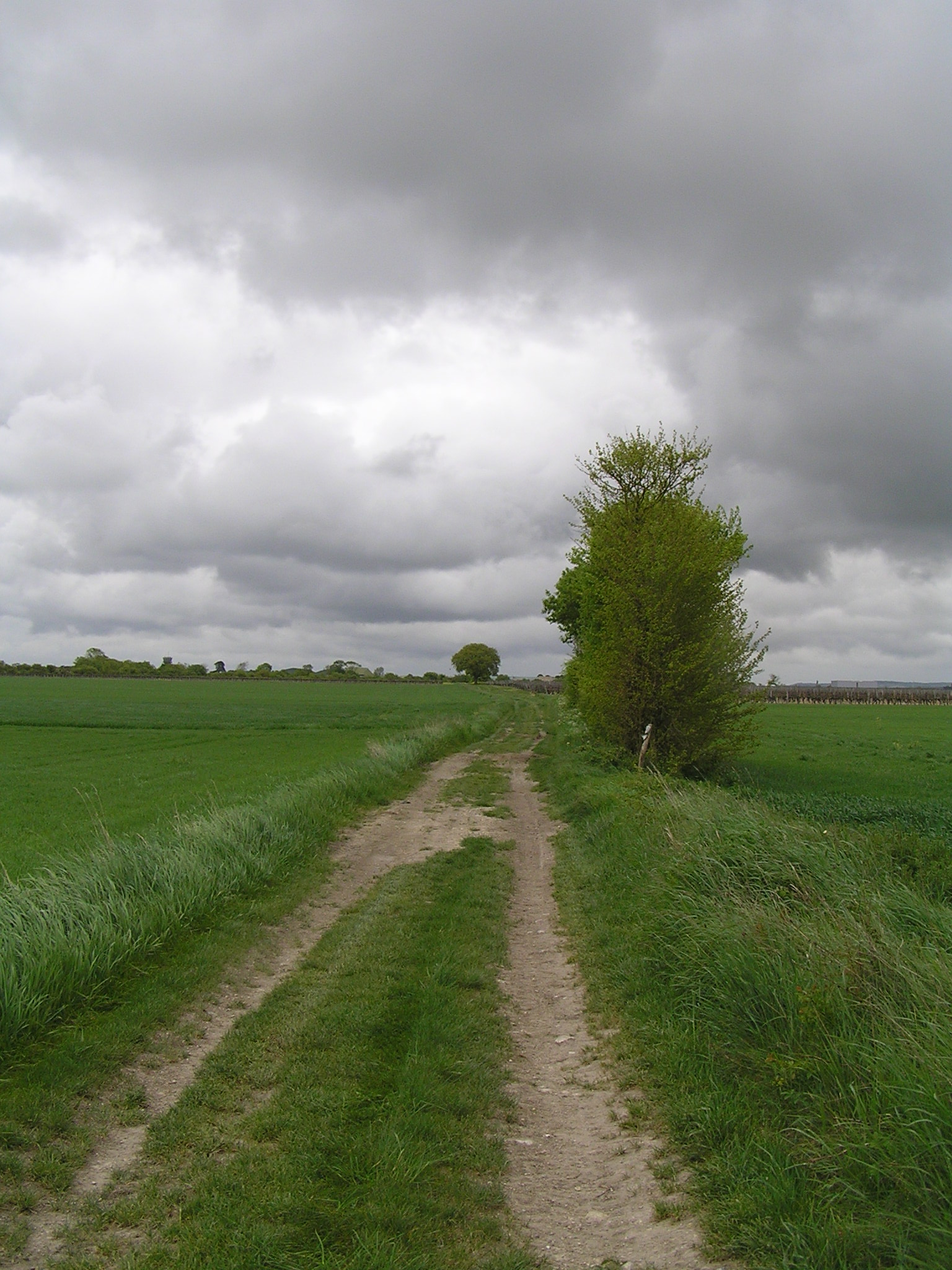

Route information
- Component highways: Remains of a Roman road, the Chemin Boisné, south of Cognac (Charente) between the D731 and the D47.

Location
- Regions: Gallia Aquitania

Roman Road from Saintes to Périgueux comprises Roman or ancient roads, both hypothetical and verified, connecting the ancient cities of Mediolanum Santonum (present-day Saintes) and Vesunna (Vésone, the current district of Périgueux) in France. Specific segments of these primary and secondary routes are referenced in written sources such as the Peutinger Table. These routes have been corroborated through archaeological and epigraphical evidence. Since the 18th century, they have been the subject of considerable conjecture. (Note: Recent reference documents on Roman roads are : Walser, Gerold, ed. (1986). Corpus Inscriptionum Latinarum [17]. Miliaria Imperii Romani. Pars secunda, Miliaria provinciarum Narbonensis Galliarum Germaniarum. Berlin, New York: Berlin-Brandenburgische Akademie der Wissenschaften. ISBN 978-3-11-004592-5.; Carte archéologique de la Gaule [Pré-inventaire archéologique] [Carte archéologique de la Gaule [Archaeological pre-inventory] [Archaeological map of Gaul]] (in French). Paris: Académie des Inscriptions et Belles-Lettres. 1988. OCLC 636991617.)

The area in question encompasses three departments: Charente-Maritime, Charente, and Dordogne.

The route between Saintes and Périgueux with the best-known route is called the Chemin Boisné (or Chemin Boisne (Note: IGN map on Géoportail)) in its passage through Charente. Another variant, passing further south through Pons and clearly of Roman construction, is recognized up to Guimps in Charente. However, continuing this route to Périgueux via Brossac, Aubeterre-sur-Dronne, or Ribérac remains hypothetical.

== History ==
It is plausible that the road corresponding to Chemin Boisné was initiated during the reign of Augustus and continued in the 2nd century to establish a connection between the Atlantic coast, Saintes, and the Domitian Way via Périgueux, Sarlat, Rodez, and Nîmes. The southward route to Italy was more consistently passable than the route through Lyon, which crossed the Alps. This route probably reused, in whole or in part, a pre-existing Gallic road.

In the Charente section, the name Chemin Boisné is documented in all land registries and numerous medieval documents. The earliest known transcription dates to 1297, indicating that it was already used as a proper name. It also appears as Chemin Boine or Boine. François Marvaud, while focusing on the Cognac region, mentions using the term Chemin Boine from the "gates of Périgueux."

The term Boisné is thought to derive from the French words "bounded" or "remarkable for its boundary stones." It may refer to additional boundary markings beyond the usual milestone markers or a boundary marked by the Count of Angoulême to designate the road's location.

Charlemagne undertook the repair of bridges along the route, and Louis the Pious ordered the repair of twelve bridges in a capitulary from 830. By the 5th century, roads that had not been maintained for a considerable period had deteriorated significantly, and many bridges had become unusable.

The term boyne, which signifies "boundary stone", was documented by Auguste-François Lièvre exclusively in Charente. Additionally, the Occitan language employs the term boina with a similar denotation. (Note: The Limousin dialect (Occitan) is used in the area between Villebois-Lavalette and Périgueux. Before the Hundred Years' War, Occitan was also the language between Saintes and Villebois.) In 1826, the route was still designated as Chomi Bouinat. Numerous other historical pathways in Charente were also referenced as chemin Boyne by extension.

Some sources have proposed a link between the toponym Boisné and Villebois-Lavalette. Indeed, it has been suggested that Boisné refers to the segment of the route between Ville-Bois and the Né, although this is not corroborated by any citations. Furthermore, the origin of this name appears to be uncertain.

== Route ==
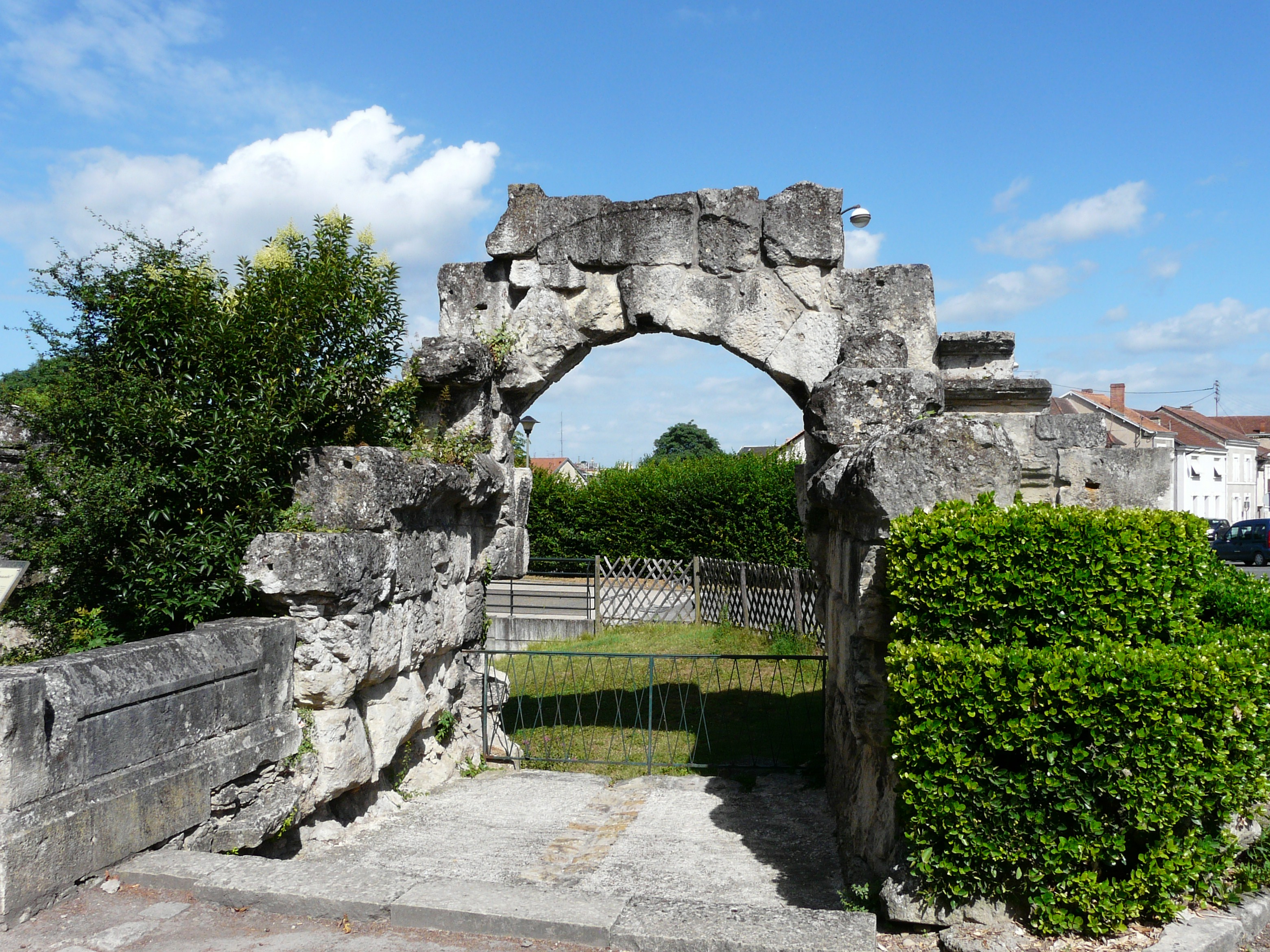
The remains of the Norman Gate in Périgueux, Vésone.

P. Barrière's account indicates that the route departed from Périgueux via the Normande gate, traversing the present-day Denis-Papin and Pierre-Sémard streets. It then proceeded through the modern-day Toulon district, where a milestone was discovered, and continued along the road from Périgueux to Bordeaux until reaching the Beauronne bridge in Chancelade. It subsequently deviated to the north, traversing the vicinity of the erstwhile Merlande priory and subsequently Bussac. In the eighteenth century, Count-archaeologist Wlgrin de Taillefer provided a detailed account of the route's trajectory. He described it as passing more to the east through the Vignéras Valley, close to the original location of the aforementioned milestone. It then crossed the ridge where the ancient Angoulême route traversed, traversed the Beauronne (south of Château-l'Évêque), and rejoined the original route north of La Chapelle-Gonaguet, in the vicinity of Crébantiéras.

The route crossed the Dronne at Port-d'Ambon (or Pont d'Ambon) and Rochereil, situated to the south of Creyssac, via a bridge or ford. The route's precise path can only be discerned through the use of aerial photography, which reveals that it partially follows the D2 and then the D106. Between La Pouge and Les Pouzes, the route is elevated.

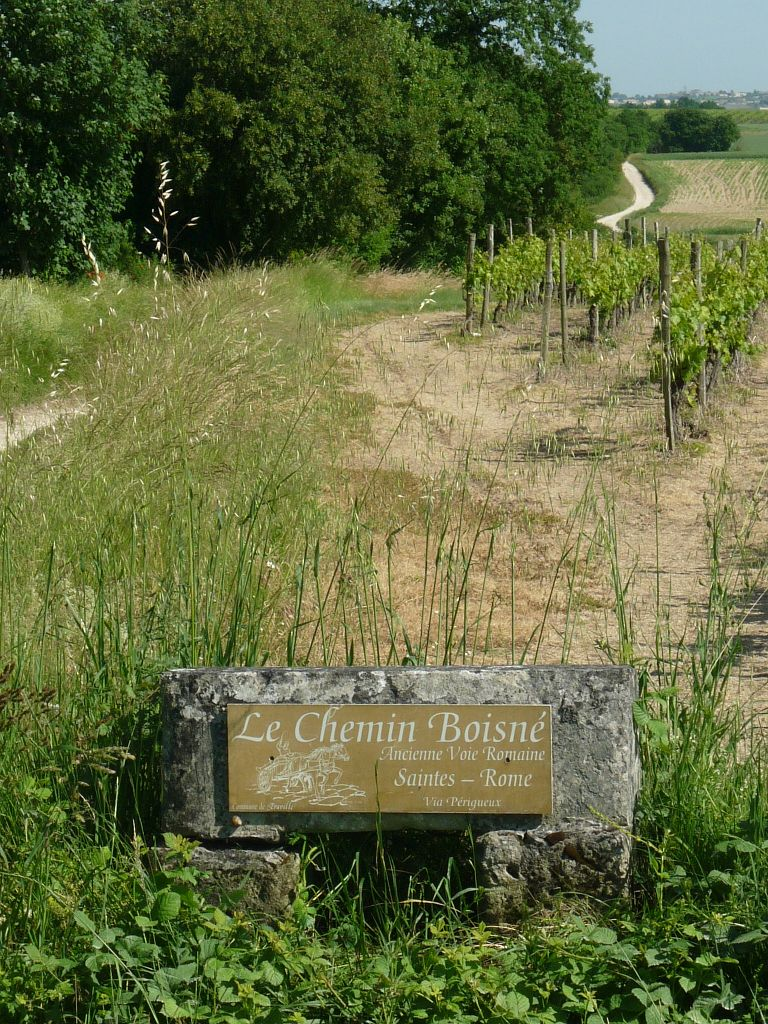
The Chemin Boisné crossing the D699 at Birac.

The river Charente is crossed by the route at a ford, at Pas de Fontaine or Pas Vieux, in the commune of Champagne-et-Fontaine. This Roman road traverses the Charente department for a distance of 60 km, and its route is meticulously documented, as it is designated as Chemin Boisné or Boisne on all cartographic representations. Its trajectory is encompassed by the designation "RD 23", traversing the southern periphery of Villebois-Lavalette, before being incorporated into the network by "RD 22", "RD 5", and subsequently "RD 22", traversing the northern periphery of Voulgézac and the southern periphery of Claix.

Upon crossing national road 10, the route follows the GR 4, passing to the south of Châteauneuf-sur-Charente through the commune of Bouteville and subsequently crossing Mainxe and Gensac-la-Pallue. A notable feature of the route is the presence of numerous Roman villas, particularly in Malaville, Bouteville, and Nonaville.

It is worthy of note that between Saintes and Périgueux, Chemin Boisné is in precise alignment with the geological layers of limestone from the Cretaceous period, particularly between Cognac and Dordogne, where it occupies the terrace between two cuestas: the northern one of Turonian age and the southern one of Campanian age. (Note: BRGM map under Géoportail.)

=== Location of Sarrum ===
It is postulated that the location between Villebois-Lavalette and Charmant is the site of one of the two stages referenced on the Peutinger Table, designated as Sarrum. Abbé Michon posits a more proximate location in relation to Charmant. A-F. Lièvre situates the site near Vesne (in the commune of Voulgézac) or Puygâti (in the commune of Chadurie). Archaeologist Jacques Dassié has narrowed the area of interest to a radius of approximately six kilometers surrounding the Château de la Mercerie, situated between Ronsenac and Magnac-Lavalette-Villars. Several Roman remains have been unearthed across the region, including evidence of residential villas and military installations. However, despite extensive research, no definitive findings have been identified within this specified range.

=== Location of Condate ===
The second stage is Condate, which is thought to be situated off the main road along the Charente River. Archaeologists Michon and Marvaud have proposed that it should be located at Merpins, which is a suitable site (given that it is a Roman fort) despite the fact that there are some copying errors on the Peutinger Table. The distances on the Peutinger Table here are in leagues, as in all of Aquitaine, rather than in miles.

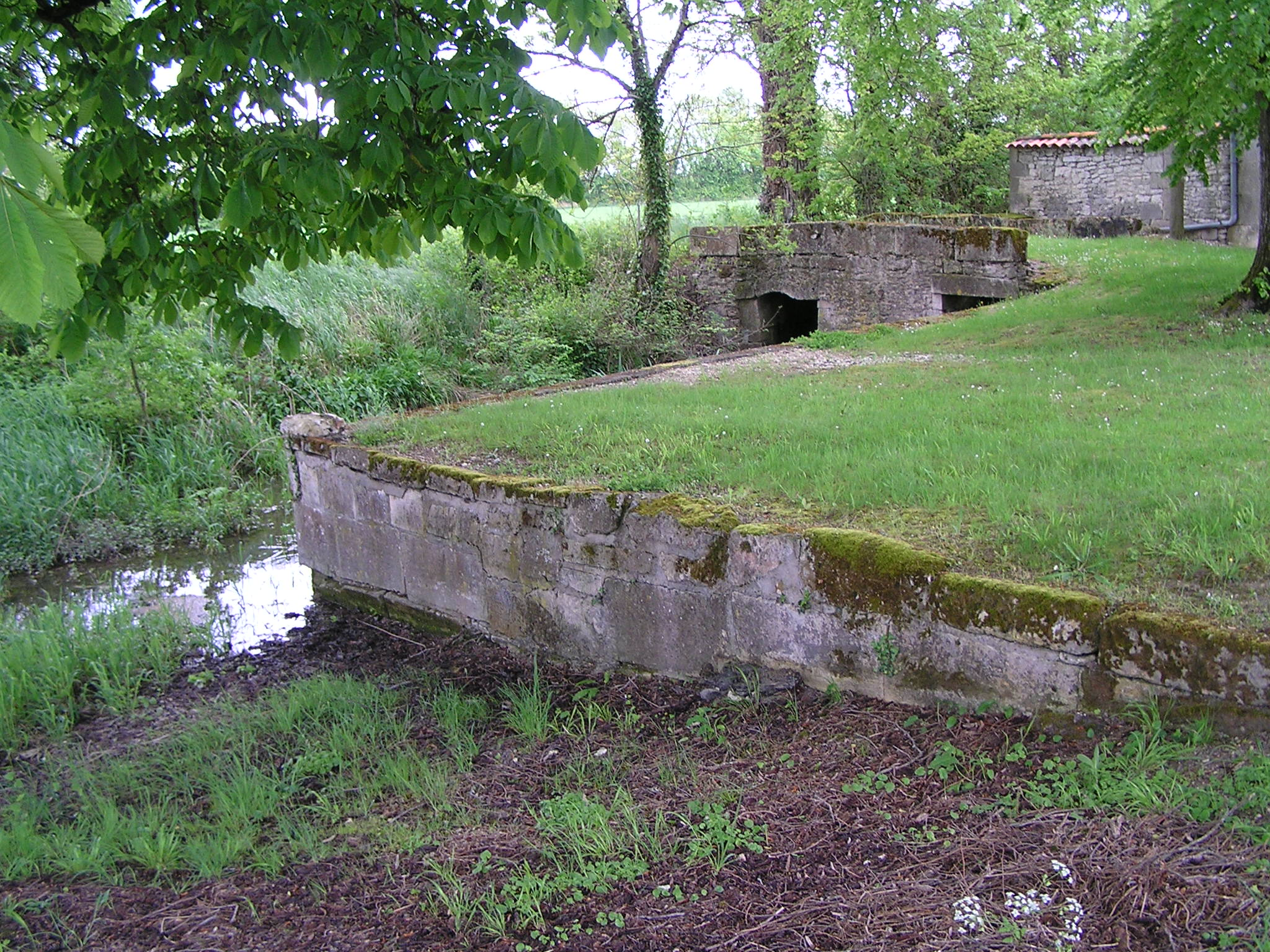
The passage from Né to l'Anglade.

A-F. Lièvre posits that the location of Condate is likely to be either La Frenade or L'Anglade on the Né River, where archaeological evidence has been uncovered. The term "Anglade", akin to "Condate", may signify the confluence of two branches of the Né.

The Boisné route persists along the left bank of the Charente, adhering to the RD 147 until it reaches the Charente-Maritime region. It then traverses the Né at Port-de-Jappe in Gimeux via a paved ford.

The route subsequently proceeds towards Brives-sur-Charente, Courcoury, and ultimately reaches Saintes, entering through Diconche. In the Charente-Maritime region, it is designated as Chemin Chaussé, Chemin du Grand Chaussée, or Route des Romains.

=== Branches ===
A route originating in Périgueux diverged northwest from the Saintes route, leading towards Gout-Rossignol or Fontaine. This route crossed the Lizonne at Pas de Pompeigne and proceeded towards Iculisma, potentially traversing Germanicomagus and Avedonacum. This route may represent one of the few Roman roads that passed through Iculisma.

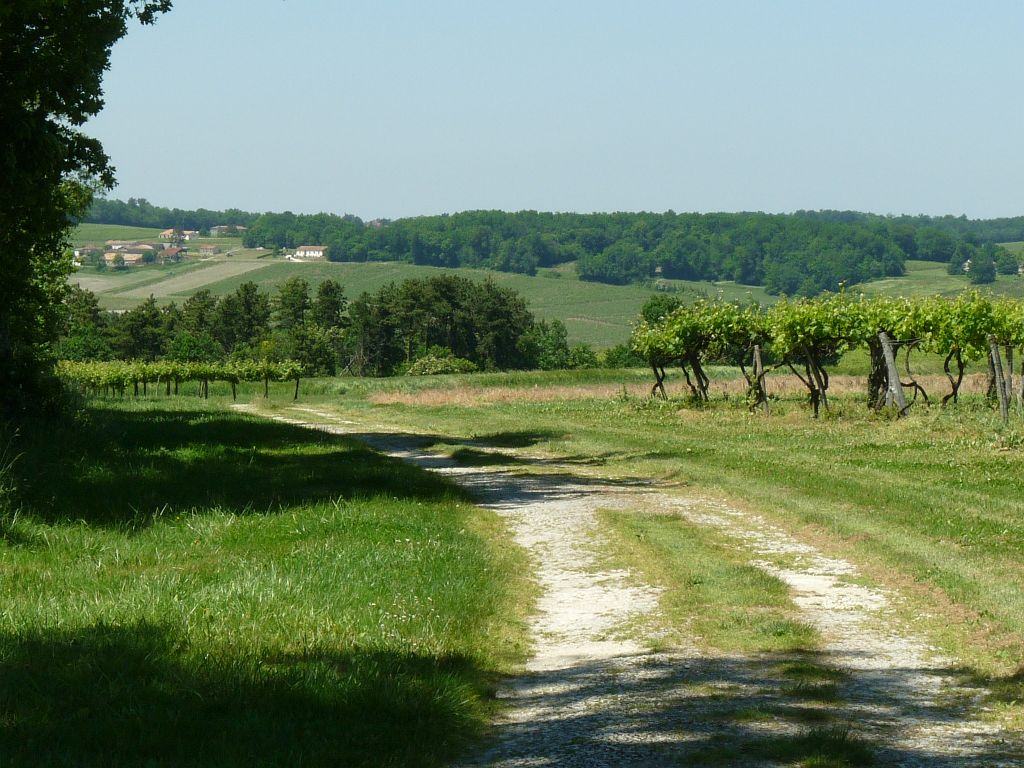
The Chemin de la Faye towards Birac.

Another branch diverged from the Saintes route near Plassac, traversing the Boisné route in a southerly direction but at a higher elevation. This route passed through Jurignac, Birac, Bouteville, and crossed the Né towards Saint-Fort. It then joined the D.731 at Echebrune, ultimately reaching Pons. It is plausible that this route extended to the coast at Novioregum via Gémozac. It is possible that this route was in use before the Roman era, as it is known to have been referred to as the Chemin de la Faye (meaning "ridge road") during that period.

=== Alternative route via Pons ===
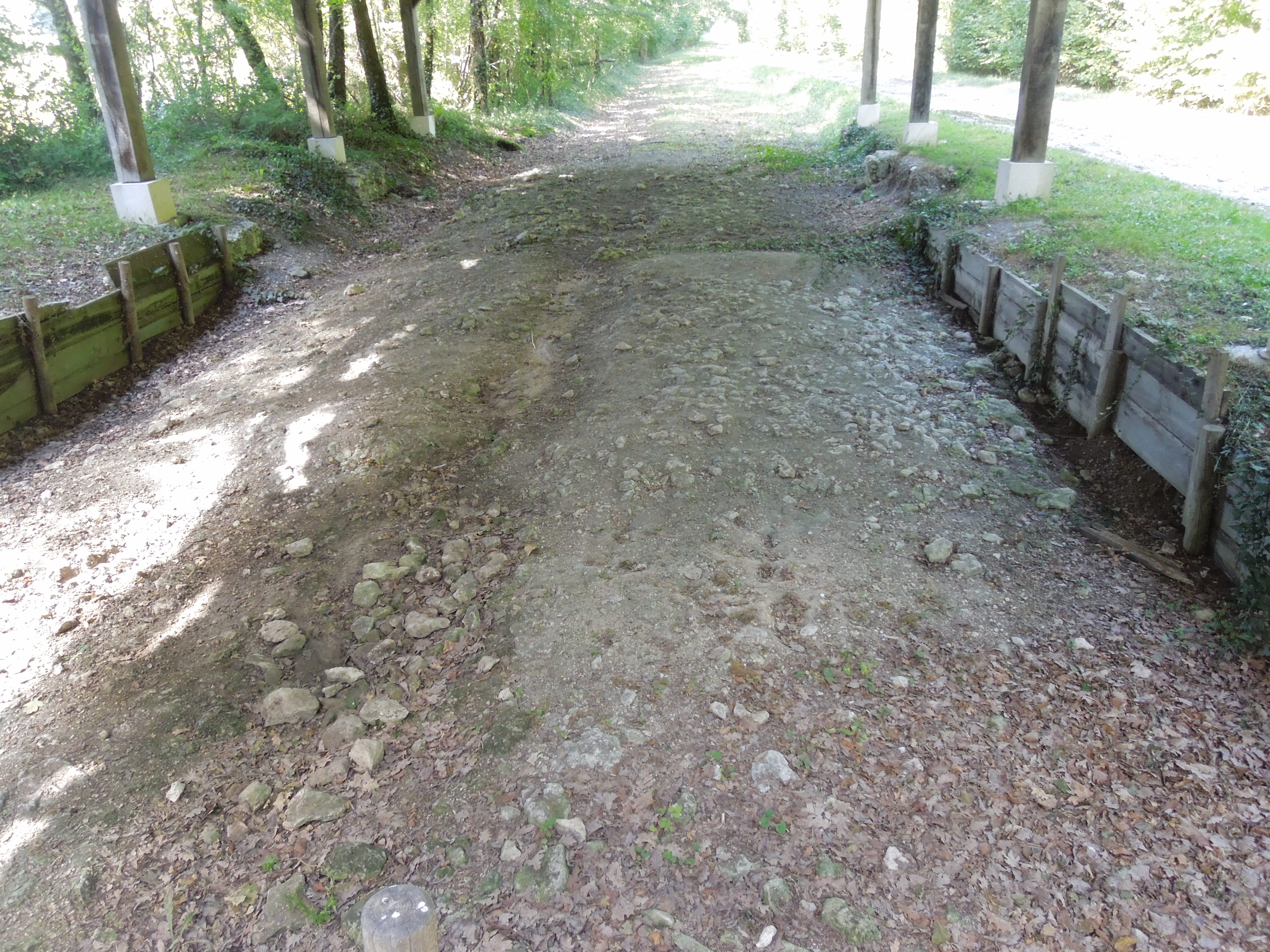
Cross-section of the Roman road between Neuillac and Neulles.

A Roman route connected Saintes to Pons and Avy, where the Coutras route diverged and headed southeast towards Neuillac. At this point, a cross-section of the route is displayed, continuing to Guimps in Charente. The route frequently follows the straight municipal boundaries that divided former Roman estates that later became villages.

The terrain to the east of Guimps is more rugged, which makes it challenging to trace the route. A-F. Lièvre posits that it traversed through Challignac, then proceeded in a southerly direction, crossing the Tude at Peudry (in Saint-Martial) and continuing towards Ribérac (where Roman remains have been discovered at Villetoureix). It is possible that it followed this route via Aubeterre-sur-Dronne.

Joseph Piveteau, of the Société archéologique et historique de la Charente, also studied a route between Guimps, Reignac, Condéon, Brossac, passing near the villa de la Coue d'Auzenat, Chalais and Aubeterre.

== Milestones ==
=== The Grande Borne ===
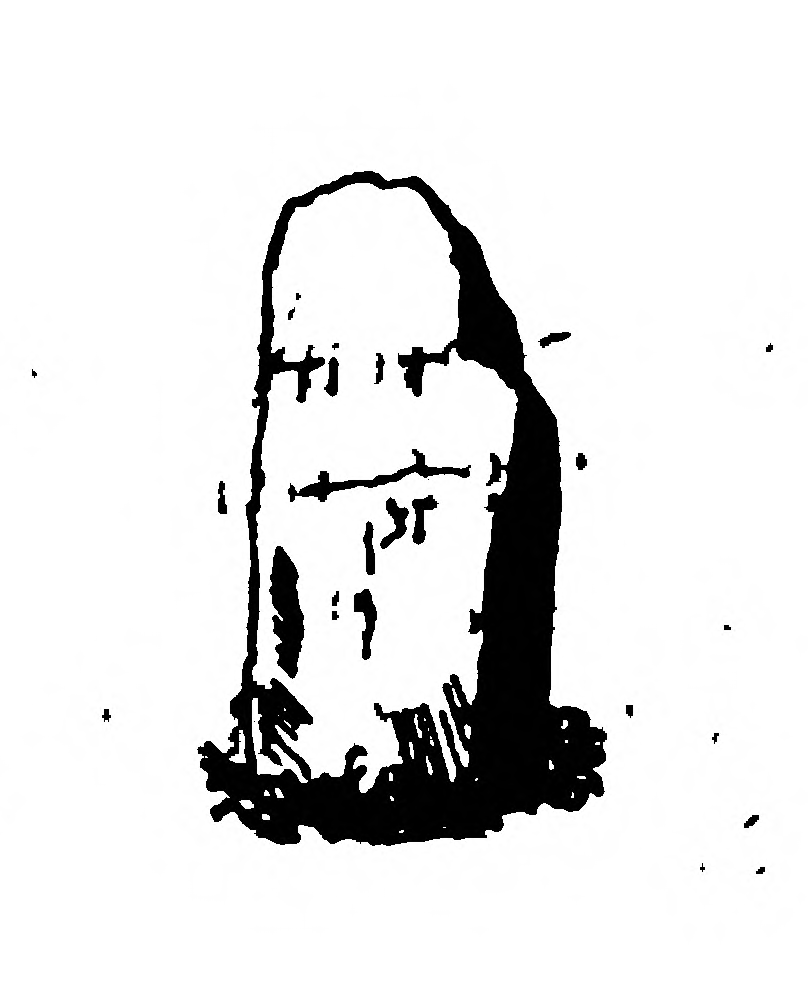
The Grande Borne at Gensac-la-Pallue (1844), now no longer in existence.

South of Cognac, on the road between La Frenade and Parveau (now an airbase), there was a flat, square stone known locally as the Grande Borne, Grosse Boune, or Grosse Boueno, located between L'Ormeau (Note: Current crossroads of the lane with the road from Cognac to Gimeux (D.47), known as les Six-Chemins (45°38′56″N 0°17′21″W)) and Bellevue. Some authors, such as François-Marie Bourignon in 1801 and later François Marvaud in 1863, deciphered some letters on it, suggesting that it could have been a milestone, although Jean-Hippolyte Michon doubted this in 1844. The stone has now disappeared.

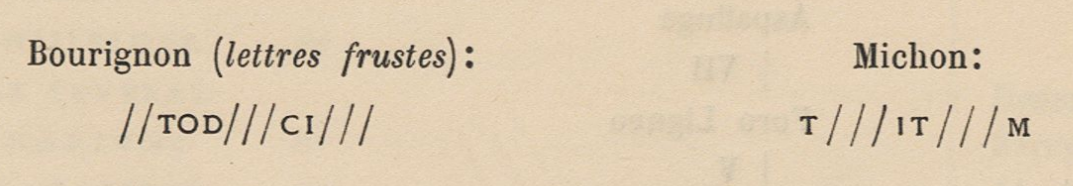
Reading of the inscription, as published in CIL XIII in 1907.

=== Borne of Toulon ===
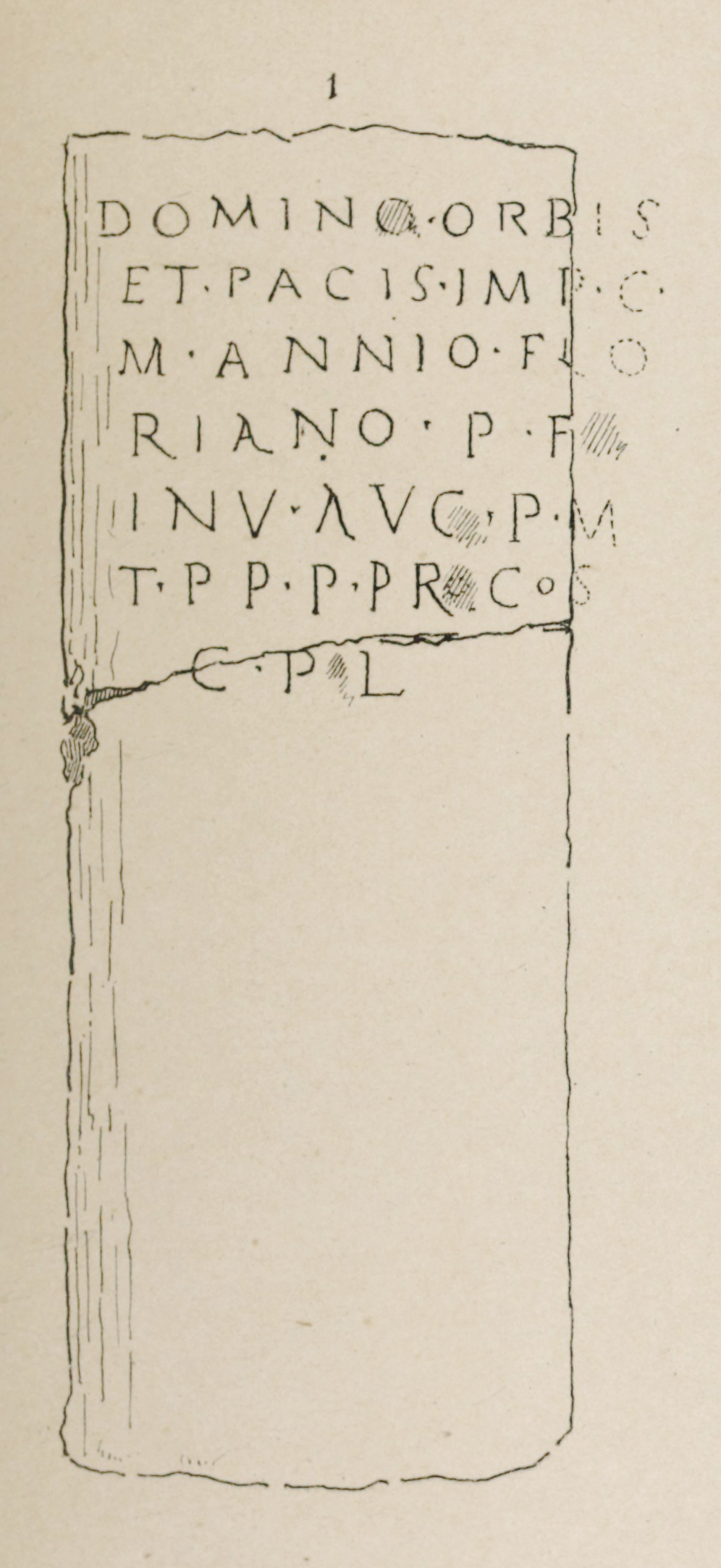
The Toulon milestone (1893), based on a drawing by Auguste Allmer revised by Espérandieu.

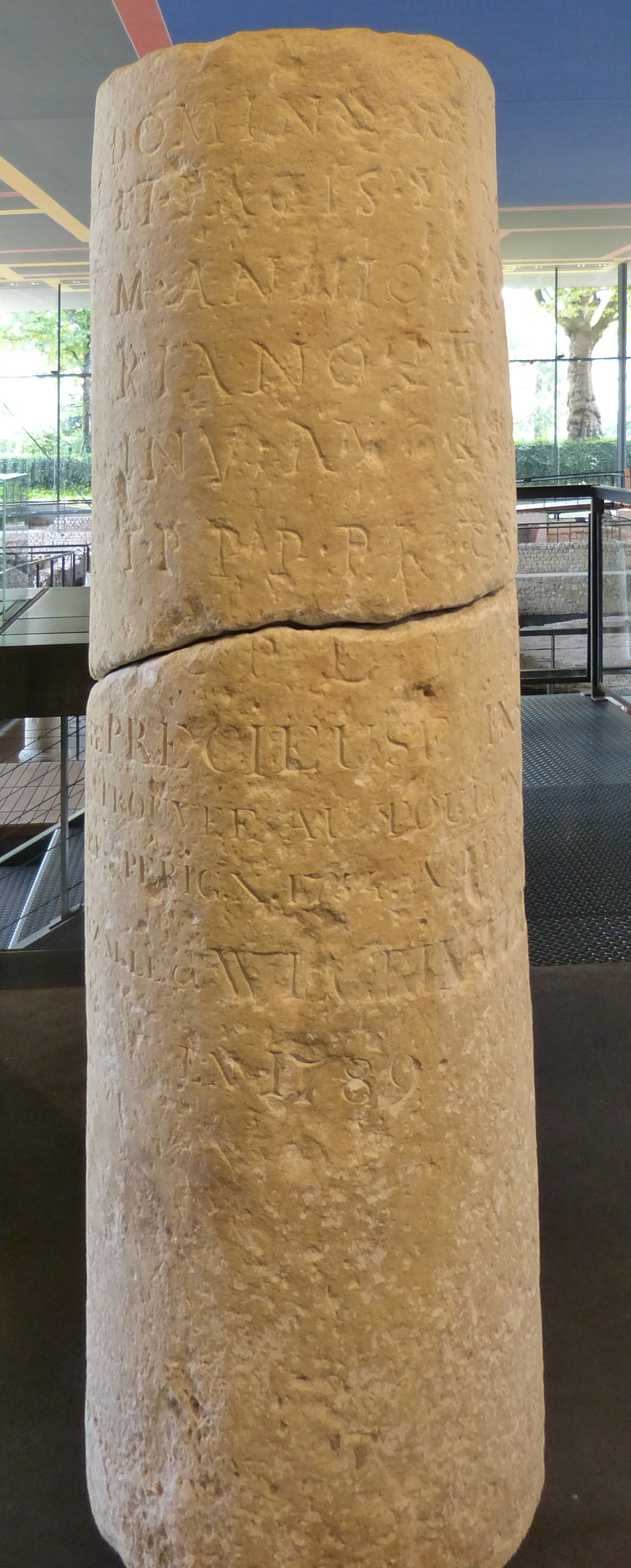
The Toulon milestone at the Vesunna Gallo-Roman Museum.

A "precious" milestone (Note: The name used here is that of Espérandieu, Emile (1893). Musée de Périgueux. Inscriptions antiques [Museum of Périgueux. Ancient inscriptions] (in French). Périgueux: Impr. de la Dordogne. pp. 11–13. See also: Mommsen, Theodor; von Domaszewski, Alfred, eds. (1907). orpus Inscriptionum Latinarum [13]. Inscriptiones Trium Galliarum et Germaniarum Latinae. Partis secundae. Fasciculus II. Miliaria Galliarum et Germaniarum. Berlin-Brandenburgische Akademie der Wissenschaften.; Walser, Gerold, ed. (1986). Corpus Inscriptionum Latinarum [17]. Miliaria Imperii Romani. Pars secunda, Miliaria provinciarum Narbonensis Galliarum Germaniarum. Berlin, New York: Berlin-Brandenburgische Akademie der Wissenschaften. ISBN 978-3-11-004592-5.; Gaillard, Hervé; Girardy-Caillat, Claudine; Chevillot, Christian; Berthault, Frédéric (1997). La Dordogne. [1]. Paris: Académie des inscriptions et belles-lettres. ISBN 978-2-87754-051-3.) was discovered in Périgueux before 1754, near the source of the Toulon stream (according to Jean Lebeuf in 1756), or possibly further north (according to Henry Wlgrin de Taillefer in 1826) in the direction of the valley south of Vignéras (perhaps in the Champcevinel district – although no author has formally located it there) or towards the Château de Barbadeau. (Note: See page 654 archive where Taillefer, returning to his first route, hypothesises a road running from south of Barbadaud 45°12′24″N 0°41′43″E as far as Beaurone 45°13′30″N 0°40′18″E, thus avoiding the valley in question by the west.)

This is one of the few milestones to bear a dedication to Emperor Florian of 276, who tried to seize power by force but whose reign lasted only a few months. Émile Espérandieu considered the inscription's title "Master of the Universe and Peace" (Domino orbis et pacis) to be an "excessive" title for Florian.

Although the inscription does not specify a distance, it probably marked the first league – either 2,222 meters (Roman league) or 2,450 meters (Gallic league) – from the Gallo-Roman sanctuary and temple dedicated to Vesunna, partially preserved by the Vésone tower. However, given the uncertainty about its original location, it could have been on the main road to Bordeaux, the road to Saintes, (Note: See the summary map on the Regnum Francorum Onlinesite archive or the three indications on the Roman Itineraries in France site on the pages ‘from Bordeaux to Périgueux’ archive, ‘from Périgueux to Limoges’ archive and ‘from Saintes to Périgueux’ archive.) or even before a branch road northwest of the ancient city of Petrocorii. A.-F. Lièvre, who favored one of Taillefer's hypotheses, (Note: Referred to as the ‘Vignéras hypothesis’ on the reconstructed route, in the link at the bottom of the page.) placed the milestone further north in the valley, possibly on a route leading to Poitiers and Nantes, via Brantôme, Bouëx, Montignac-Charente, Mansle, and Rom.

The stone has been on display (Note: The museum confirms that it retains it (on 3 February 2014, by email), although no information is given in online sites, catalogues or inventories.) at the Vesunna Gallo-Roman Museum in Périgueux since 2003 (previous inventory, n° 251).

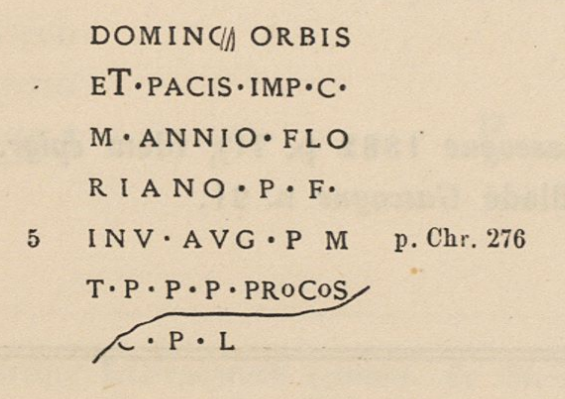
Reading of the inscription, as published in CIL XIII in 1907.

=== Chadenac Milestone ===
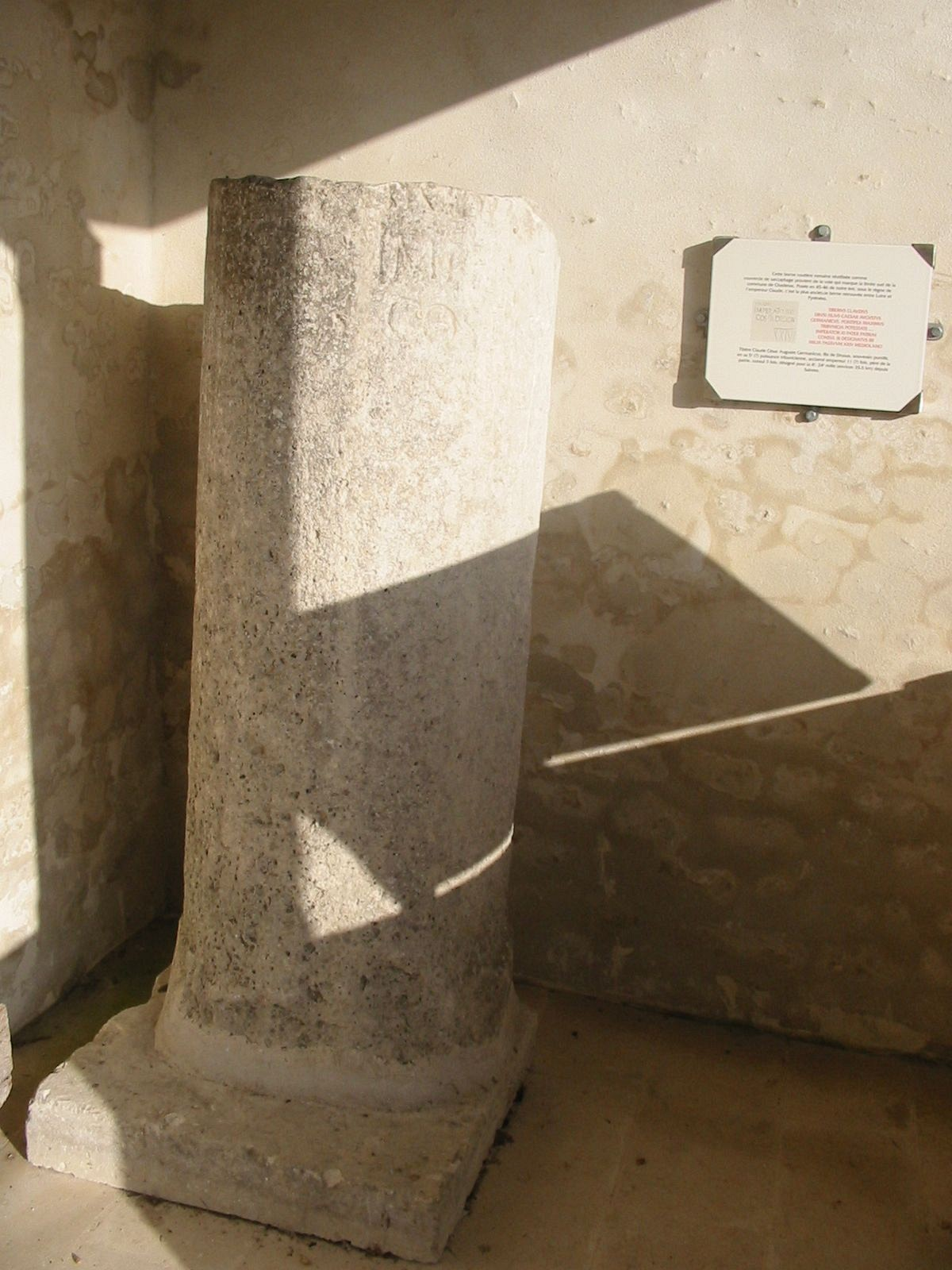
The Chadenac milestone.

In 1863, a Roman milestone was found in the old cemetery of Chadenac (Charente-Maritime), near the Roman road from Pons to Guimps, where a cross-section can be seen between Neuillac and Neulles. It had been transformed into a sarcophagus basin in late antiquity or the early Middle Ages, after being reshaped to cut off the first lines of the inscription.

The inscription dates from 45-46 AD (under Emperor Claudius) and shows the number XXIV. (Note: See more details on the Petrae database (Louis Maurin, 2014) archive, a geolocalised view (45°32′31″N 0°26′38″W) on Street View archive, and also other milestones in the list of French milestones protected as historic monuments (the monument in question being owned by the commune and within the protection perimeter of the Saint-Martin church).)

In 1893, Auguste-François Lièvre first interpreted it as 24 leagues, a local unit used by the Romans throughout Aquitaine. He thought that the milestone referred to the Saintes-Coutras route, although Chadenac was not on this route, and that this distance marked the fines (border) between the Santones and the Bituriges.

The Gallic league hypothesis was further examined by Jacques Dassié, who also proposed that this distance marked the fines, but that of the city of Petrocorii, a boundary he placed at Aubeterre-sur-Dronne, through which he believed the route passed. He suggested that the unit used was the Gallic league of 2,416 meters rather than the Romanised league of 2,222 meters. These ideas, published in 1999, have not been taken up in more recent archaeological publications, such as those by Louis Maurin in 2000 and 2014.

Louis Maurin, author of La Carte archéologique de la Gaule de la Charente-Maritime, and the editors of the CIL suggest that the distance of 24, partially preserved on the text, is expressed in miles, counted from Mediolanum (Saintes) towards Guimps. (Note: [Ti(berius) Claudius] / [Drusi f(ilius) Caes(ar) Aug(ustus)] / [Germanicus, pont(ifex) max(imus)], / ṭṛịḅụṇ[ic(ia) potest(ate) ---], / imperatọṛ XI, [p(ater) p(atriae)], / co(n)s(ul) I̅I̅I̅ design(atus) [IIII], / (milia passuum) X̅X̅I̅V̅ Ṃ[ed(iolano)] Translation by Louis Maurin (2014) : Tiberius Claudius Caesar Augustus Germanicus, son of Drusus, sovereign pontiff, in his 5th (?) tribunic power, acclaimed imperator 11 (?) times, father of the fatherland, consul 3 times, designated for the 4th. 24th mile from Mediolanum.) Although the point of origin (either Fines or Saintes) and the unit remain controversial, this interpretation implies that the milestone was moved about 6 km (Note: Perhaps as far as Périgueux via Aubeterre, as is sometimes envisaged.) (Note: 24 miles is 35 kilometres. Chadenac is only 29 kilometres from Saintes, via Pons.) from its original location along the ancient road near the southern border of the commune.

Discovered in 1863 during the first excavations of the Gallo-Roman cemetery at the "Terrier de la Chapelle" (a chapel dedicated to Saint Sône, destroyed in the 18th century), some 600 meters east-south-east of the village, (Note: Around 45°32′17″N 0°25′58″W.) the milestone was initially moved to the roadside near the site. In the twentieth century, it was moved to its present location, where it can be seen in a shed with other relics near the church of Saint-Martin.

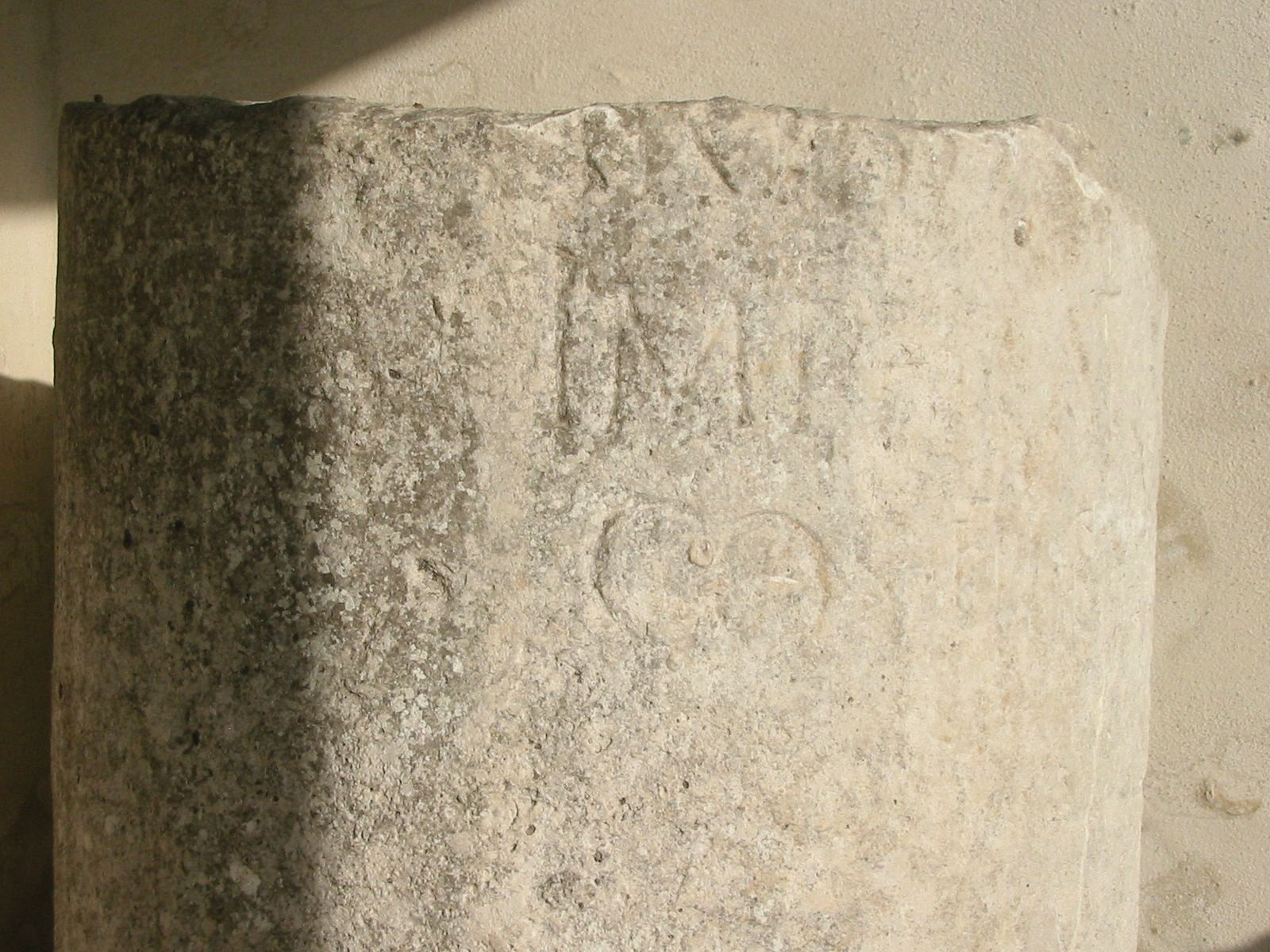
Registration details.

=== Unfound milestones ===
It is thought that a milestone was found in the commune of Éraville (Charente), where the Boisné road crosses the Biau, but there is no archaeological evidence of this.

== See also ==
- Roman roads
- Tabula Peutingeriana
- Saintes • Périgueux
- Roman Road of Agrippa (Saintes–Lyon)

== Bibliography ==
- Dassié, Jacques (1999). La grande lieue gauloise [The great Gallic league]. Gallia (in French). Vol. 56. CNRS Éditions. pp. 285–311. doi:10.3406/galia.1999.3011. Archived from the original on October 1, 2024.
- Prade, Marcel (1998). Histoire du chemin Boisne [History of Chemin Boisne] (in French). Éditions la Péruse. ISBN 2-907588-38-9.
