= Gallo-Roman villa at La Coue d'Auzenat =

Remains of a Gallo-Roman villa in the commune of Brossac

Gallo-Roman Villa at La Coue d'Auzenat
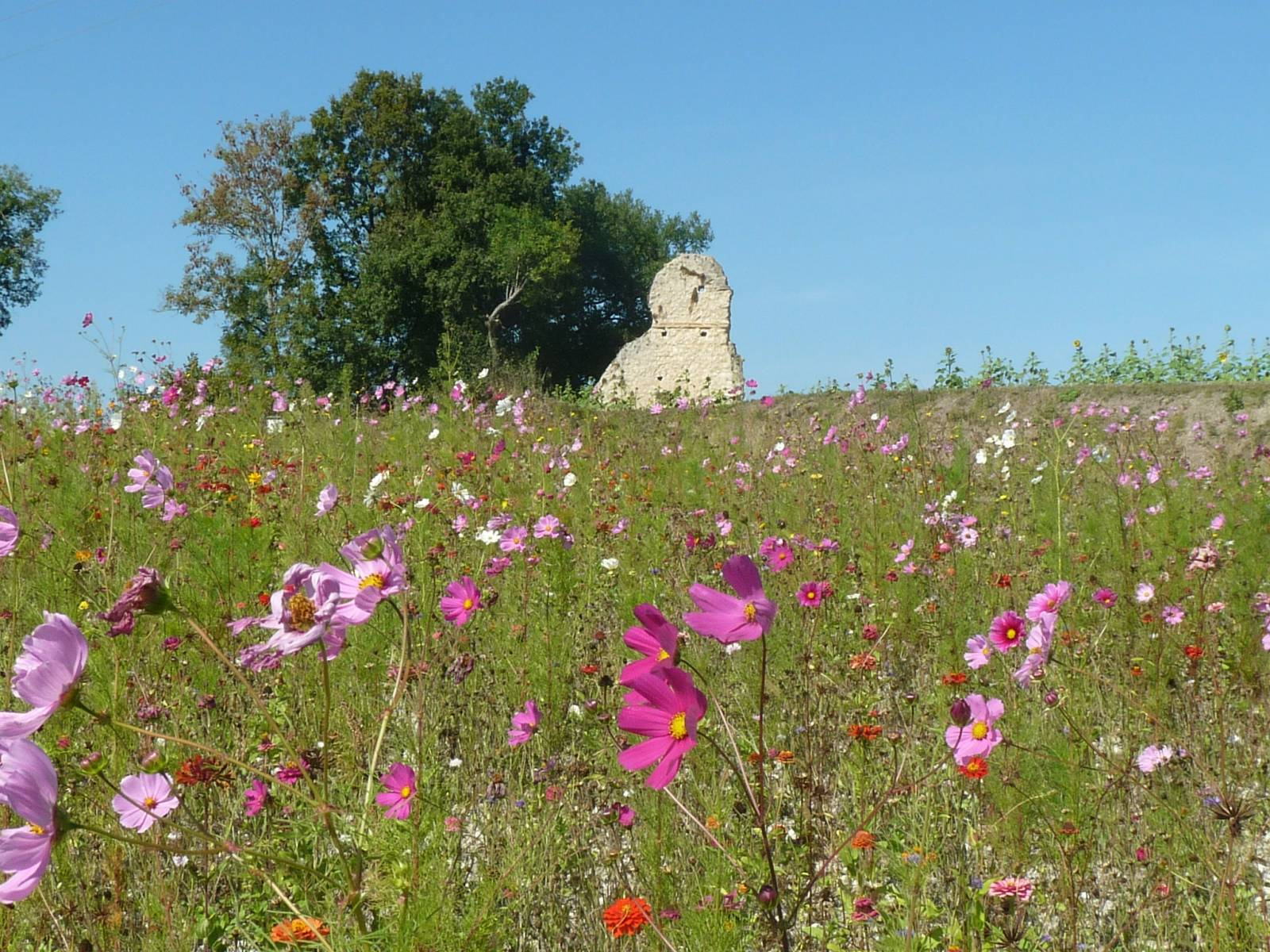
- Lacou Dauzena Roman ruins at Brossac (16), France

- Location within France
- 45°19′52″N 0°01′42″W
- Location: Charente

Site notes
- Elevation: 107 m (351 ft)

The Gallo-Roman villa at La Coue d'Auzenat, also spelled Lacou Dausena, is the remains of a Gallo-Roman villa in the commune of Brossac, in the Charente département of southwestern France.

== Location ==
The remains of this Gallo-Roman villa are located 48 km south of Angoulême and 1 km east of Brossac in the direction of Brie-sous-Chalais, at a place called La Coue d'Auzenat.

The villa lies less than 500 m northeast of a likely Roman or ancient road linking Saintes to Périgueux and Cahors, passing through Pons, Guimps, Condéon, Brossac, and Ribérac.

== Toponymy ==
In 1278, a text reported by Jacques Duguet mentions las Couz d'Ouvenac, an Occitan expression meaning “the walls of Ouvenac”.

In the 17th century, private archives mention “le village de Cosse, autrement dit de l'Auzenac” or “la prise du cou d'Auzenac”.

Abbé Jean Hippolyte Michon, a 19th-century Charentais archaeologist who detailed the site in 1844, mentioned the poet Ausonius, a landowner in the region, who he believed gave his name to the place.

== Architecture ==
In 1844, Abbé Michon described a corps de logis measuring 57.40 m by 22 m, which seems to have continued into the sloping ground. The structure is oriented south-east to north-west.

The second floor is marked by a 2.85 m-high base. The stones were joined with a very strong cement, similar to that found at Chassenon or La Berche. Michon also found fragments of mosaics.

The walls probably correspond to the urbana area of a Gallo-Roman villa, i.e. the master's house. Not far away would have been the rustica area.

Construction techniques suggest that the building dates from before the 2nd century, under the Antonines or later under the Severans.

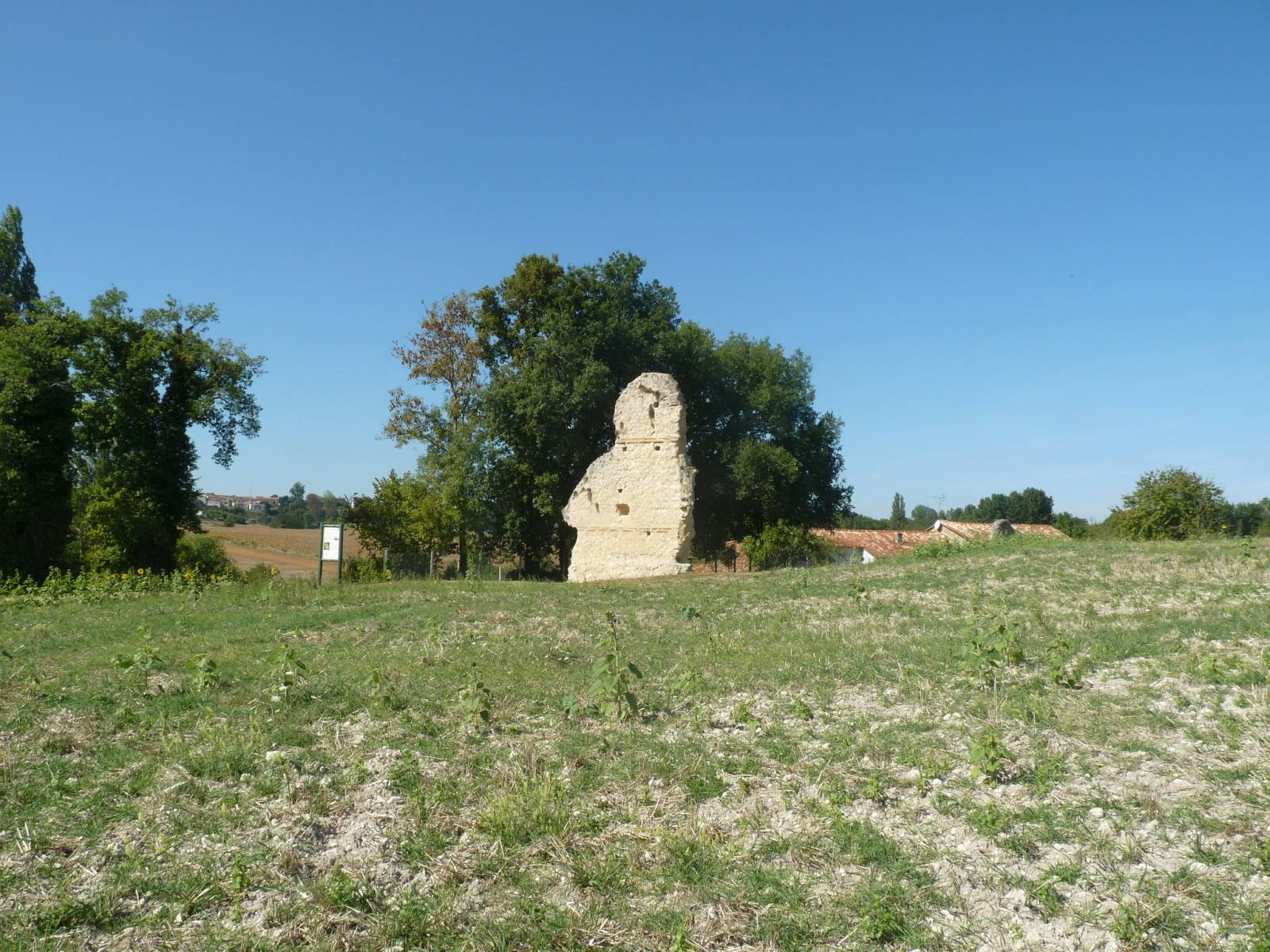
The site seen from the south

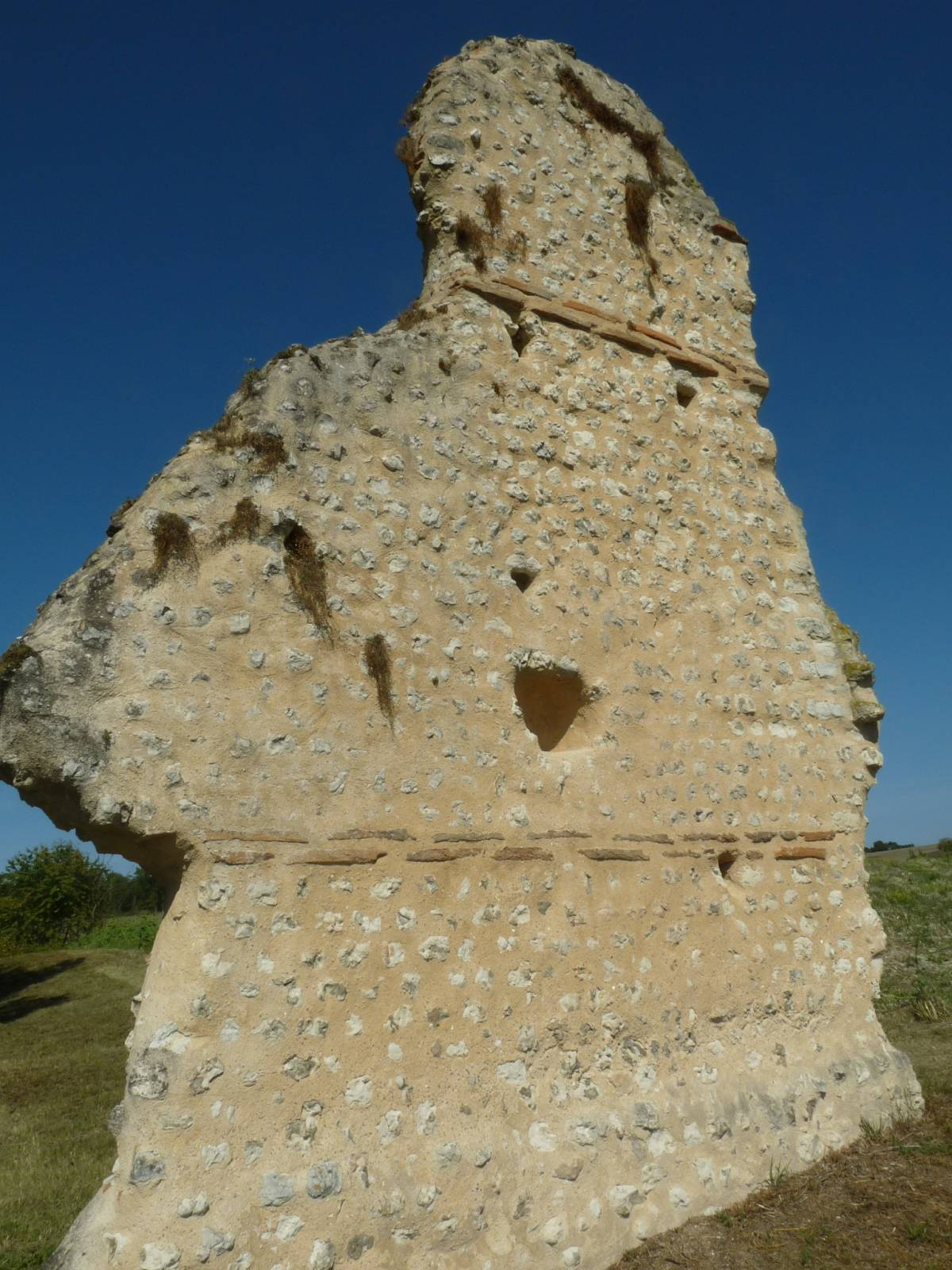
South-east wall, exterior face

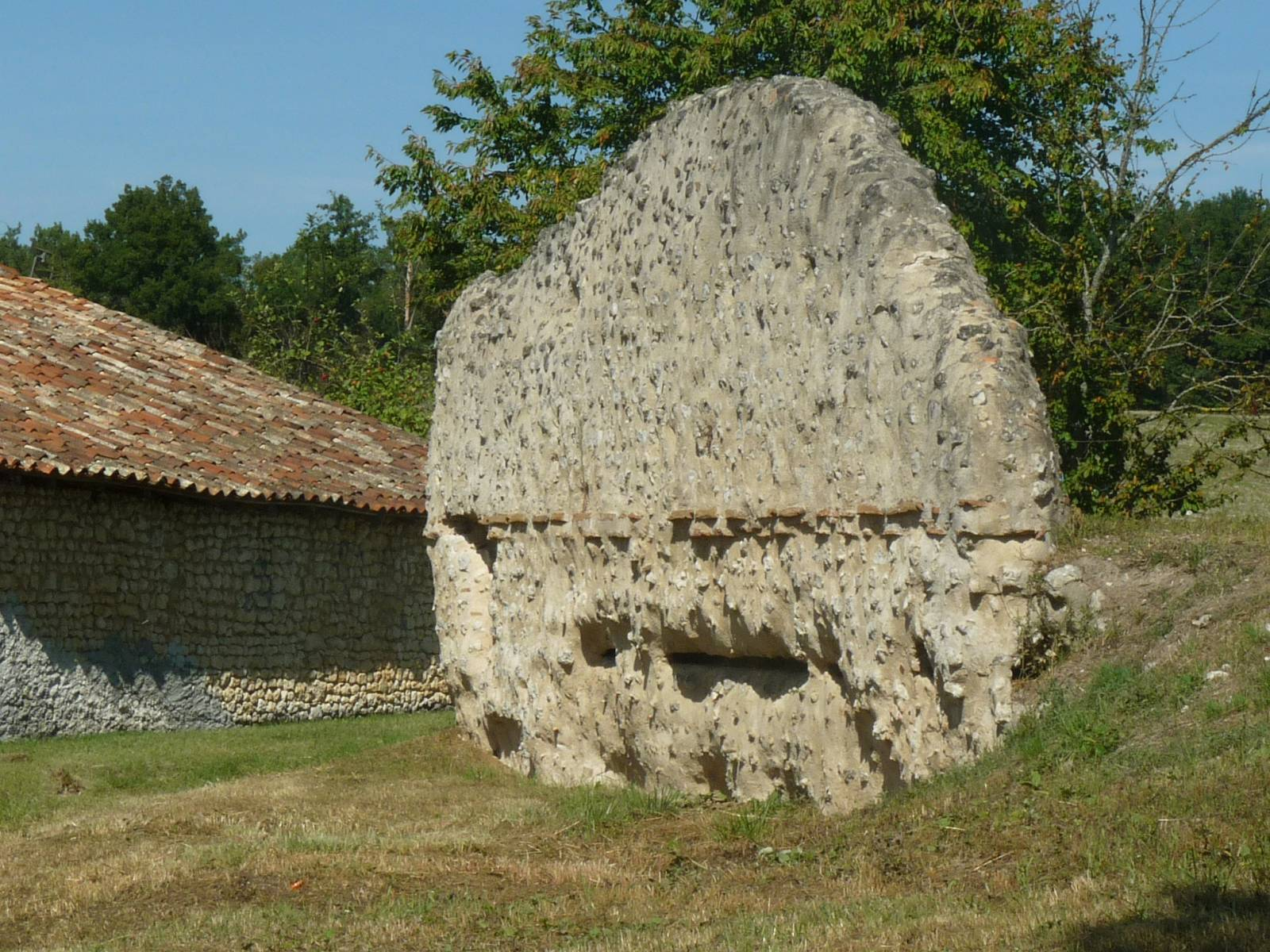
Northwest wall, inside face

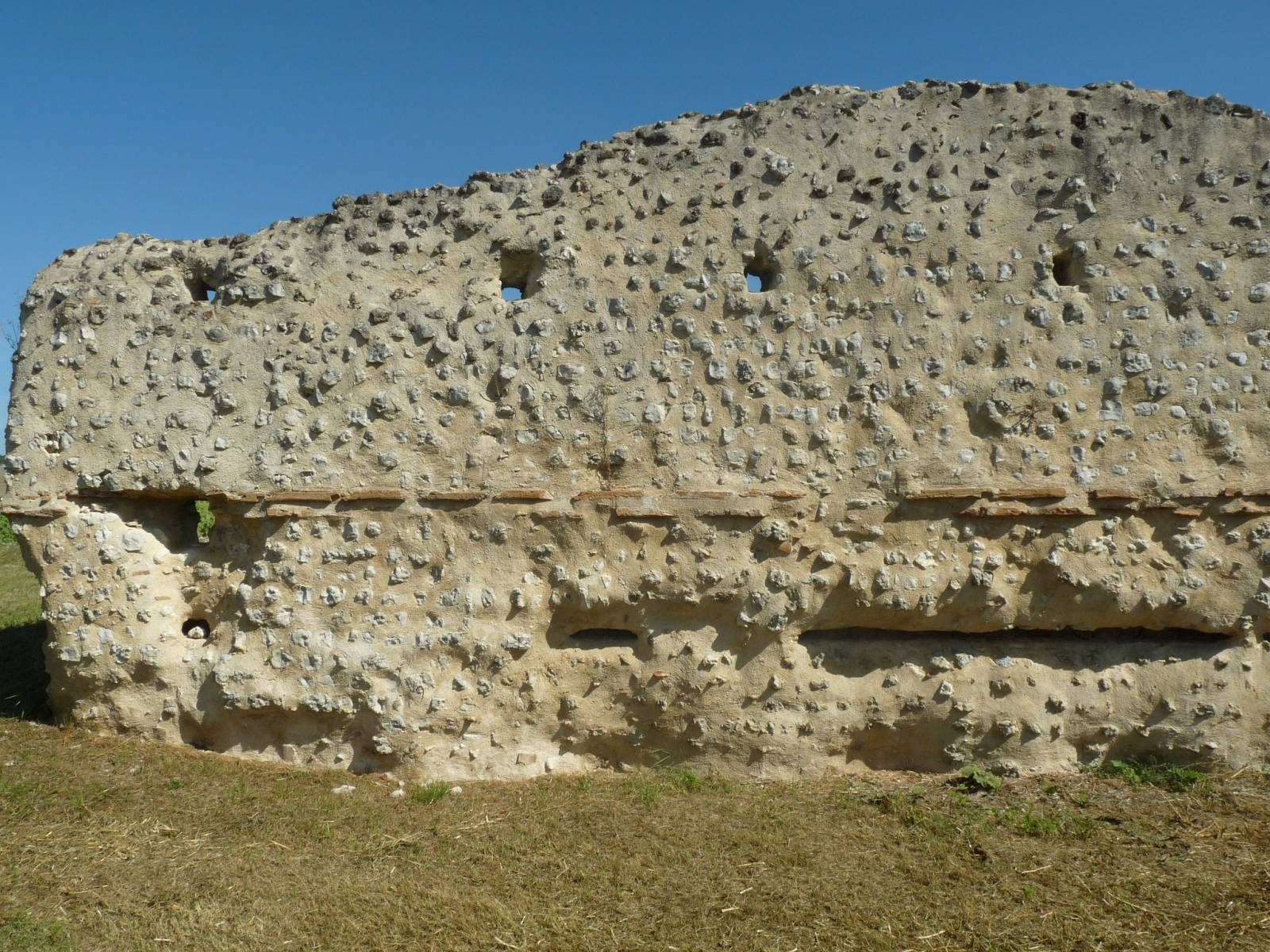
North-east wall, inside face

== Aqueduct ==
At 62 m north of the villa, Abbé Michon also discovered an aqueduct that brought water from a fountain 1 km away on a hilltop called Fontenelle. Fragments of a lead pipe were found inside this aqueduct.

The Fontenelles spring was located near the hamlet of Chez Rabanier, and the aqueduct followed the Coulée des Fontenelles.

At the foot of the villa, the aqueduct is divided into channels dug into the thickness of the walls at their base. They are 25 cm wide and 12 cm high. These walls rest on two thin 25 cm walls. The channels are made of bricks with flanges.

This is the source of the Viveronne, a tributary of the Tude at Chalais.

== Protection ==
The remains of the villa were listed as a historic monument in 1875, as were those of the aqueduct in 1889.

The Charente General Council has owned the site since 1980.

== See also ==
- Roman Gaul
- Roman villa
- History of Charente

== Bibliography ==
- Vernou, Christian (1993). La Charente [Charente] (in French). Paris: Maison des Sciences de l'Homme. p. 74.
- "Mairie de Brossac" [Brossac Town Hall]. brossac.fr (in French).
