= Château de la Mercerie =

Castle in Nouvelle-Aquitaine, France

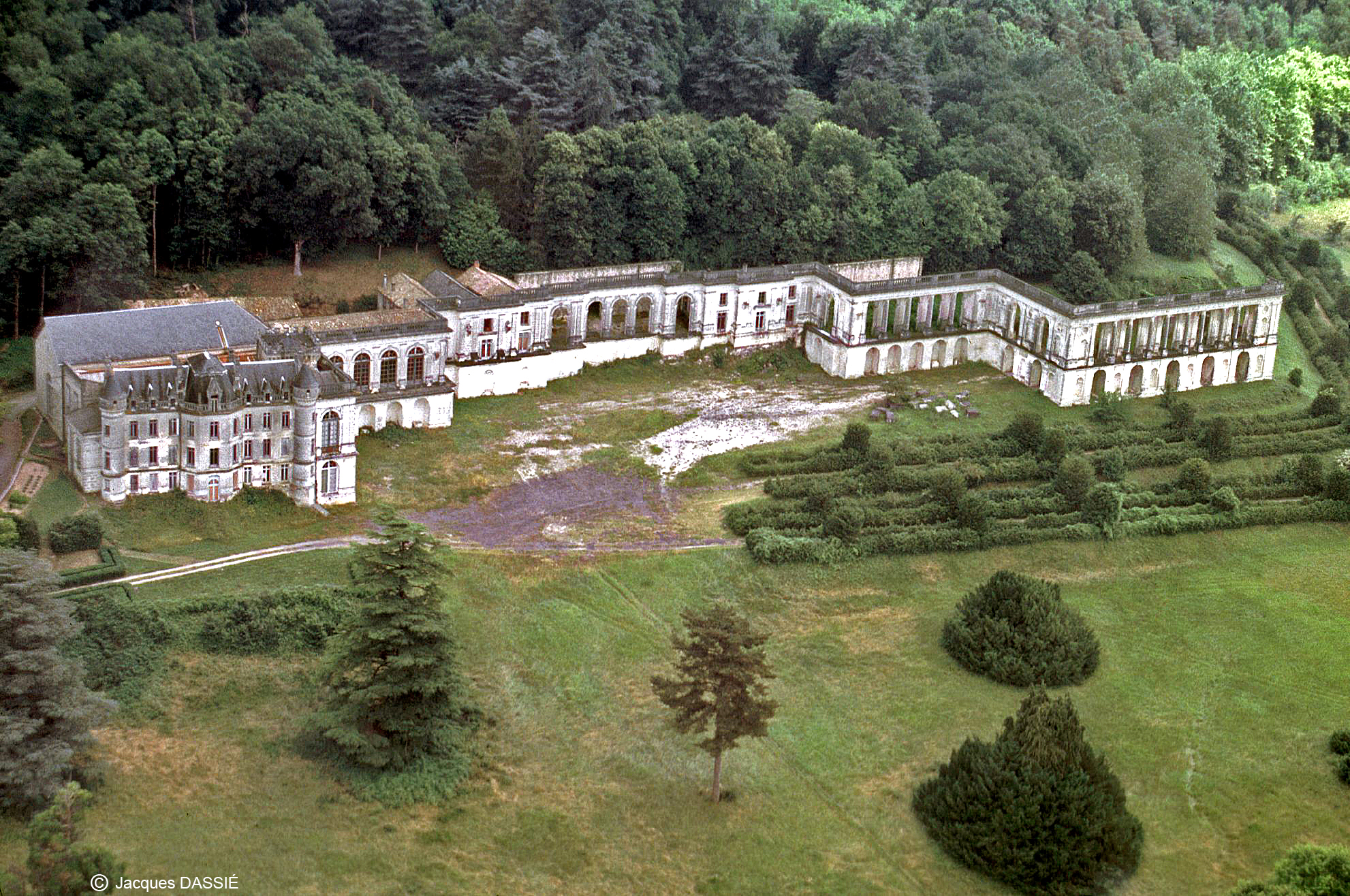
- General view of the Château de La Mercerie

- Location within France

General information
- Type: Castle
- Architectural style: Italian Renaissance and Neo-Gothic
- Location: Magnac-Lavalette-Villars, Nouvelle-Aquitaine, France
- Coordinates: 45°30′05″N 0°14′32″E
- Completed: 19th century
- Owner: Société Foncière Volta

Website
- www.chateaudelamercerie.fr

Château de la Mercerie is located in the commune of Magnac-Lavalette-Villars, Charente, France.

Enlarged in the 20th century in a classical Italian Renaissance style by two men, but never completed, it is nicknamed the Versailles charentais.

== Location ==
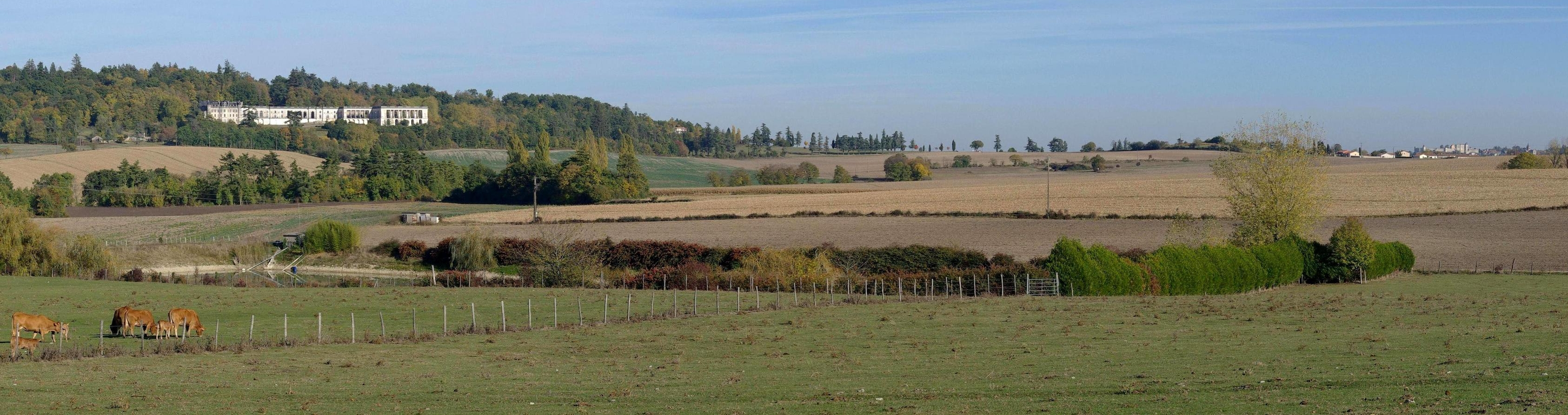
View from the west

Located 5 km north-west of Villebois-Lavalette and 17 km south-east of Angoulême, not far from the Dordogne department, the château is built on the slopes of Puy de Magnac, a landmark on the watershed between the Charente and Garonne rivers. It is visible from many parts of southern Charente.

It can be reached via the D.81 from Angoulême and Torsac, or the D.5 from Villebois.

== History ==
From the 16th to the 18th century, the Rousseau family were lords of La Mercerie. The family was ennobled in 1595 by the appointment of Gilles Rousseau as the King's squire.

The neo-Gothic château, built in the late 19th century, replaces the former dwelling.

In 1924, thanks to the generosity of their uncle, the Réthoré brothers, Raymond, an industrialist and later a Gaullist MP for the Charente, and Alphonse, a self-taught architect, bought the 600-hectare estate from the Mesnaud de Saint-Paul family, who had inherited the property through the 1799 marriage of Paul Mesnaud de Saint-Paul (born in Laplaud on October 20, 1766; died in Voulgézac on February 12, 1838), to Marie-Julie Rousseau de Magnac de la Mercerie.

In 1939, the two brothers undertook the extension of the château and planned to transform it into the Versailles charentais by building a long façade in the Italian Renaissance style, which took place mainly in 1947 with the help of workers but stopped in 1975 for lack of funds.

All the 19th-century rooms were lavishly decorated, with furniture, paintings, and sculpture collections. At the sale of the furniture of the 11th Duchesse de La Rochefoucauld (1866-1933) at the eponymous Château Charentais, he acquired furniture presumed to have come from the Count, then Prince Orlov (1787-1862), which can be seen on a Braun postcard depicting the château's grand salon around 1900.

Raymond Réthoré travels and brings back paintings, marble, woodwork, statues, chandeliers, panelling, and other treasures from abroad, and even, for a time, an Italian restorer is put in charge of the collections. For a time, he was attached to the cabinet of Charles de Gaulle, President of the French Republic, and invited important French and foreign personalities to visit this major project.

The two brothers did not succeed in bequeathing the château to the Département, the Assemblée Nationale, or the City of Angoulême, although the latter accepted the 2,068 volumes of the library, which included a significant collection of rare books on architecture.

They died in 1983 (Alphonse) and 1986 (Raymond) respectively, but their unrelated heirs had to sell the collections to pay off their debts at auction in 1987, and in 1988 the château was acquired by Bernard Baruch Steinitz (1933-2012), a famous Parisian antique dealer, who unfortunately did little to maintain it.

In 2002, a restoration project was drawn up by Isabel Guérin, with the aim of revitalizing the site and making it suitable for contemporary art collections.

In 2008, the château was sold to the Parisian property company Volta.

In 2011, a 75-year emphyteutic lease was signed on August 22nd between the company and the commune of Magnac-Lavalette.

With the help of a volunteer association, Saint-Étienne Patrimoine, the commune then undertook the restoration of the built parts and works of art in order to open the château to summer visitors from 2013 onwards.

The Italian restorer is in charge of the collections for four months of the year.

A one-ton Triumph of Christ is hoisted to the 8.70m high ceiling.

=== Arboretum ===
In addition, the château is surrounded by some 50 hectares of woodland, planted with rare plant species brought back by Raymond Réthoré from his travels to create an arboretum, as well as a rose garden.

A total of 30,000 m3 of earth had to be removed to create the 40-hectare extended gardens.

=== Protection ===
The entire built and unbuilt parts of the château and its outbuildings were listed as historic monuments on October 19, 2012, while the previous decree of 1988 only covered the château's south-west façade and all the interior decorations designed by the Réthoré brothers: the chambre called de Béruges, the salon central, the salon called le Vernet, the vestibule, the mahogany gallery, the grande galerie known as azulejos, the galerie des Vernet, Raymond Réthoré's study, the salon and library and the two brothers' bedrooms on the second floor has been cancelled.

== Architecture ==
The château comprises two parts. The complex faces southwest.

The oldest part, the primitive mansion, is located to the extreme left of the present building's north-west façade; it dates from the late 19th century and is neo-Gothic in style.

In 1947, a 220-meter-wide, 20-meter-deep, 15-meter-high facade was added to the south-east of the original manor house - which was to be demolished for the sake of stylistic unity - imitating Italian Renaissance architecture and bearing a certain resemblance to the facades of the Château de Bizy in Vernon, rebuilt around 1860 by architect William Henry White, said to have been inspired by the Villa Albani in Rome.

Views of the château

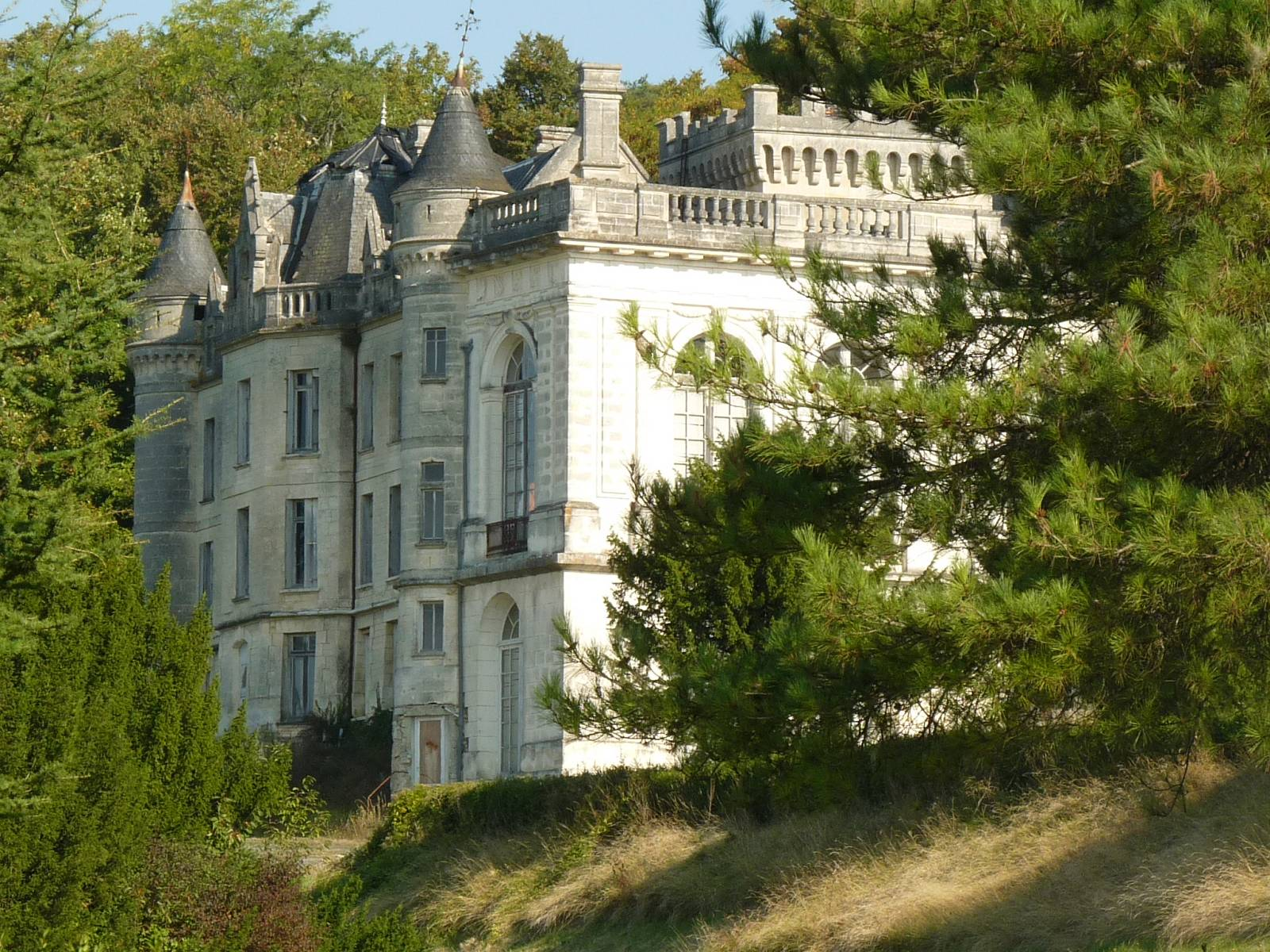
The 19th century château

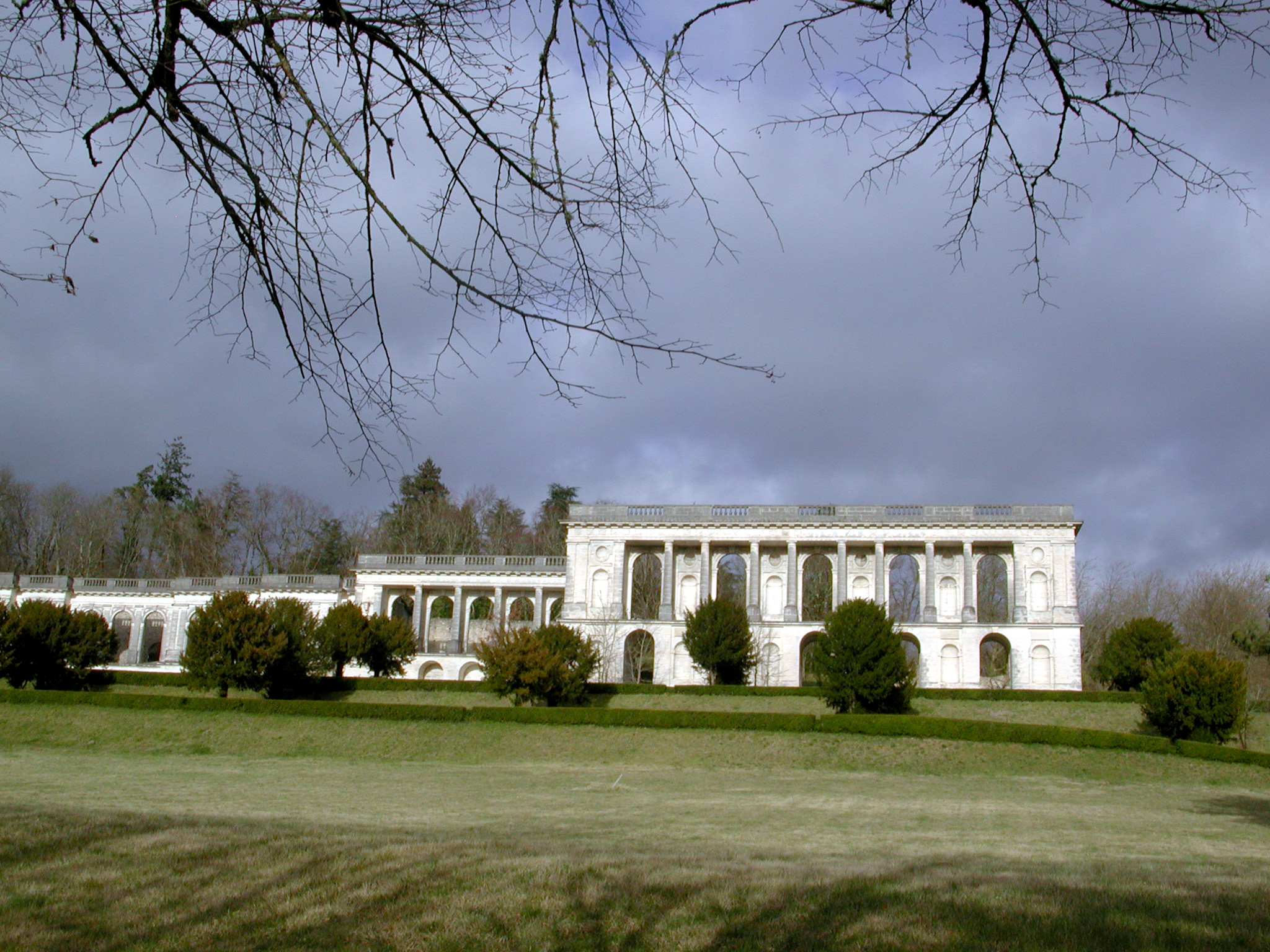
The extension

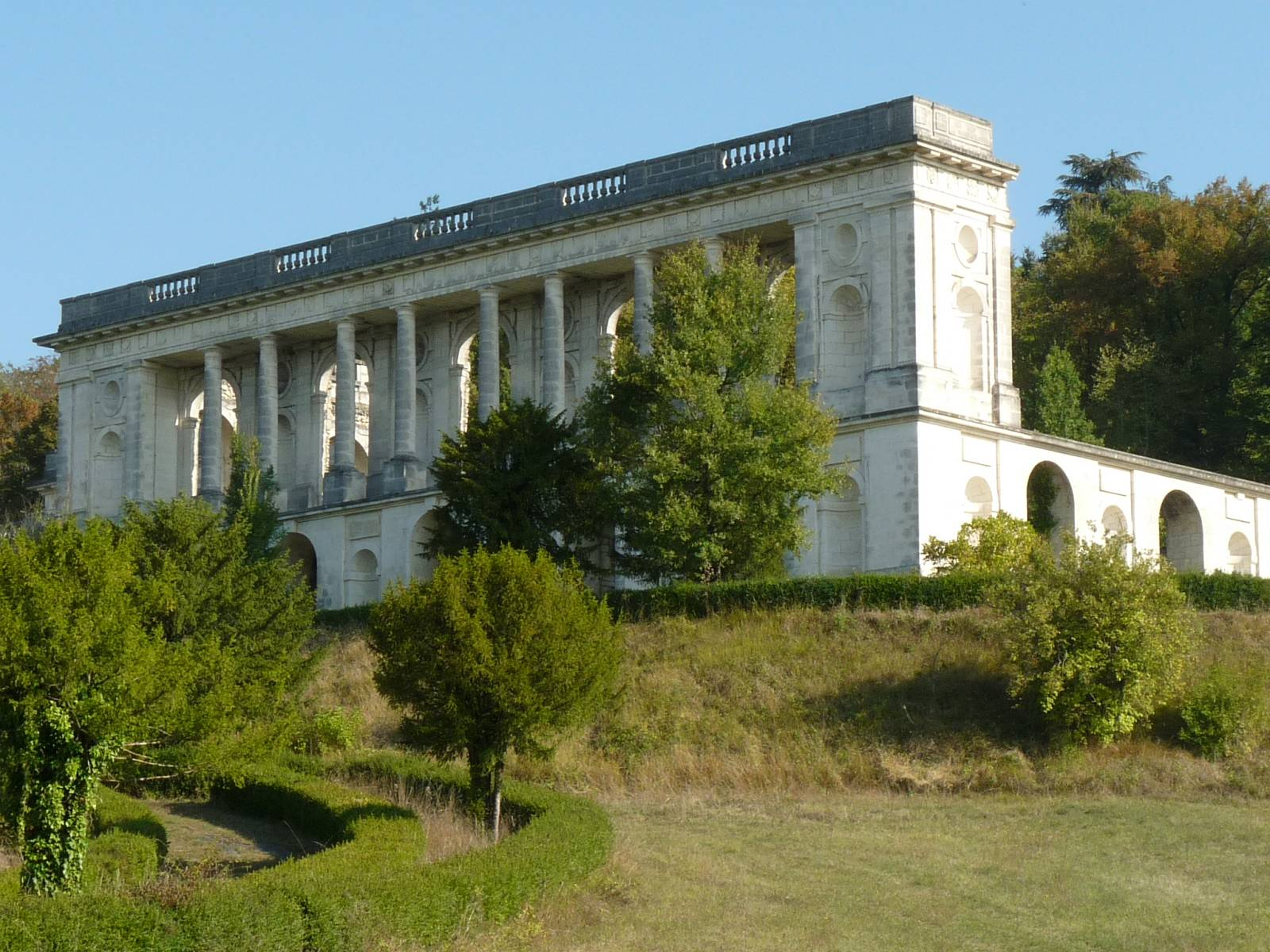
View of the east wing

== Bibliography ==
- Groensteen, Thierry (2013). La Mercerie, une folie charentaise [La Mercerie, a Charentaise folly] (in French). Brussels: Les Impressions Nouvelles. ISBN 9782874491689.
