= Neulles =

- Commune
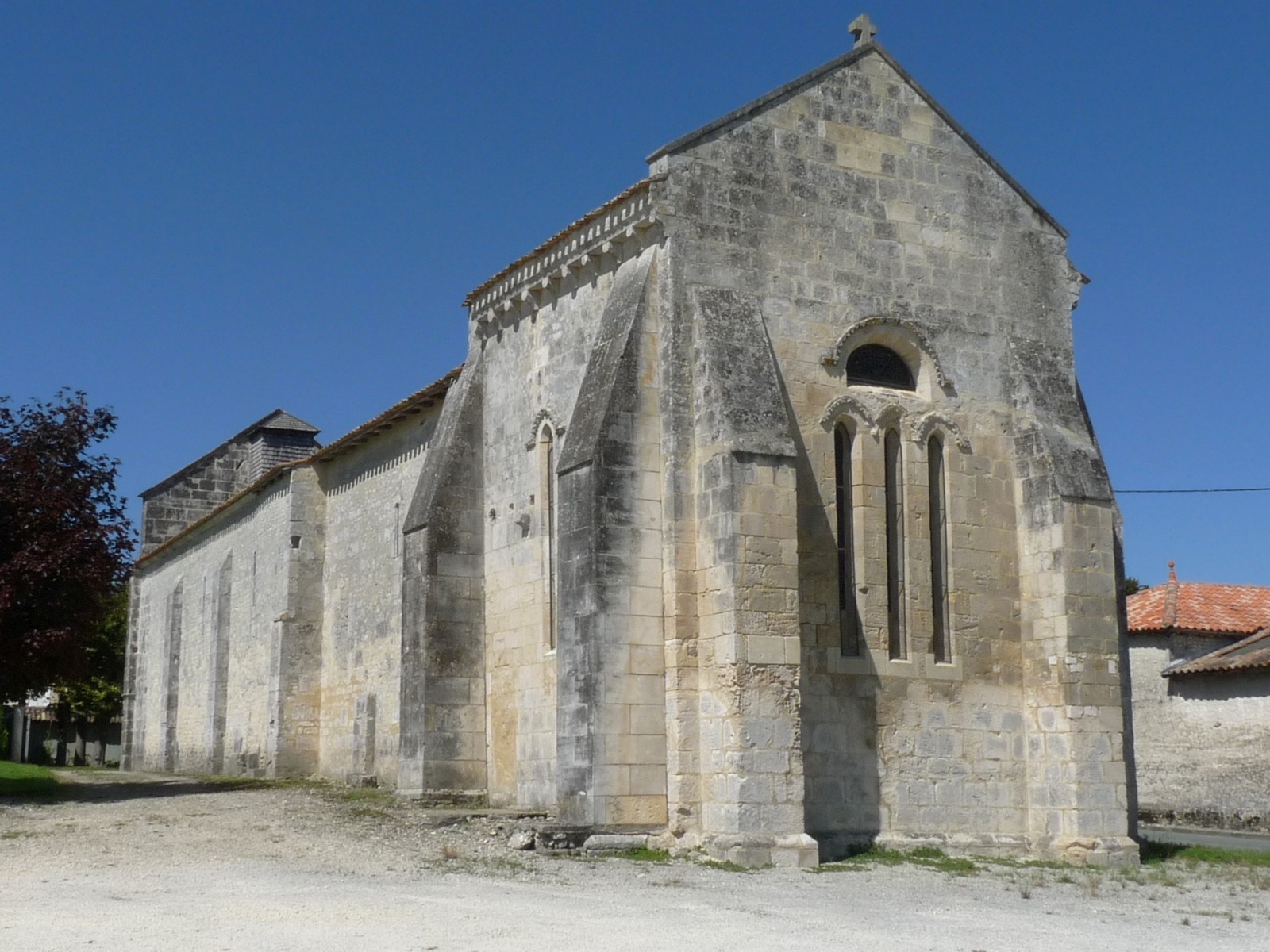
- The church in Neulles
- Location of Neulles
- Location within France Location within Nouvelle-Aquitaine
- Coordinates: 45°30′14″N 0°24′59″W
- Country: France
- Region: Nouvelle-Aquitaine
- Department: Charente-Maritime
- Arrondissement: Jonzac
- Canton: Jonzac

Government
  - Mayor (2020–2026): Jean Reynal
- Area^{1}: 5.9 km^{2} (2.3 sq mi)
- Elevation: 35 m (115 ft)
- Highest elevation: 59 m (194 ft)
- Lowest elevation: 24 m (79 ft)
- Population (2023): 165
  - Density: 28/km^{2} (72/sq mi)
- Time zone: UTC+01:00 (CET)
  - Summer (DST): UTC+02:00 (CEST)
- INSEE/Postal code: 17259 /17500
- ^{1} French Land Register data, which excludes lakes, ponds, glaciers > 1 km^{2} (0.386 sq mi or 247 acres) and river estuaries.

Neulles (French pronunciation: [nœl]) is a commune of the Charente-Maritime department in southwestern France.

== Population ==
Historical population
Year	Pop.	±% p.a.
1968	176	—
1975	168	−0.66%
1982	170	+0.17%
1990	155	−1.15%
1999	139	−1.20%
2007	138	−0.09%
2012	153	+2.09%
2017	148	−0.66%
2023	165	+1.83%
Source: INSEE

== See also ==
- Communes of the Charente-Maritime department
