= Villebois-Lavalette =

- Commune
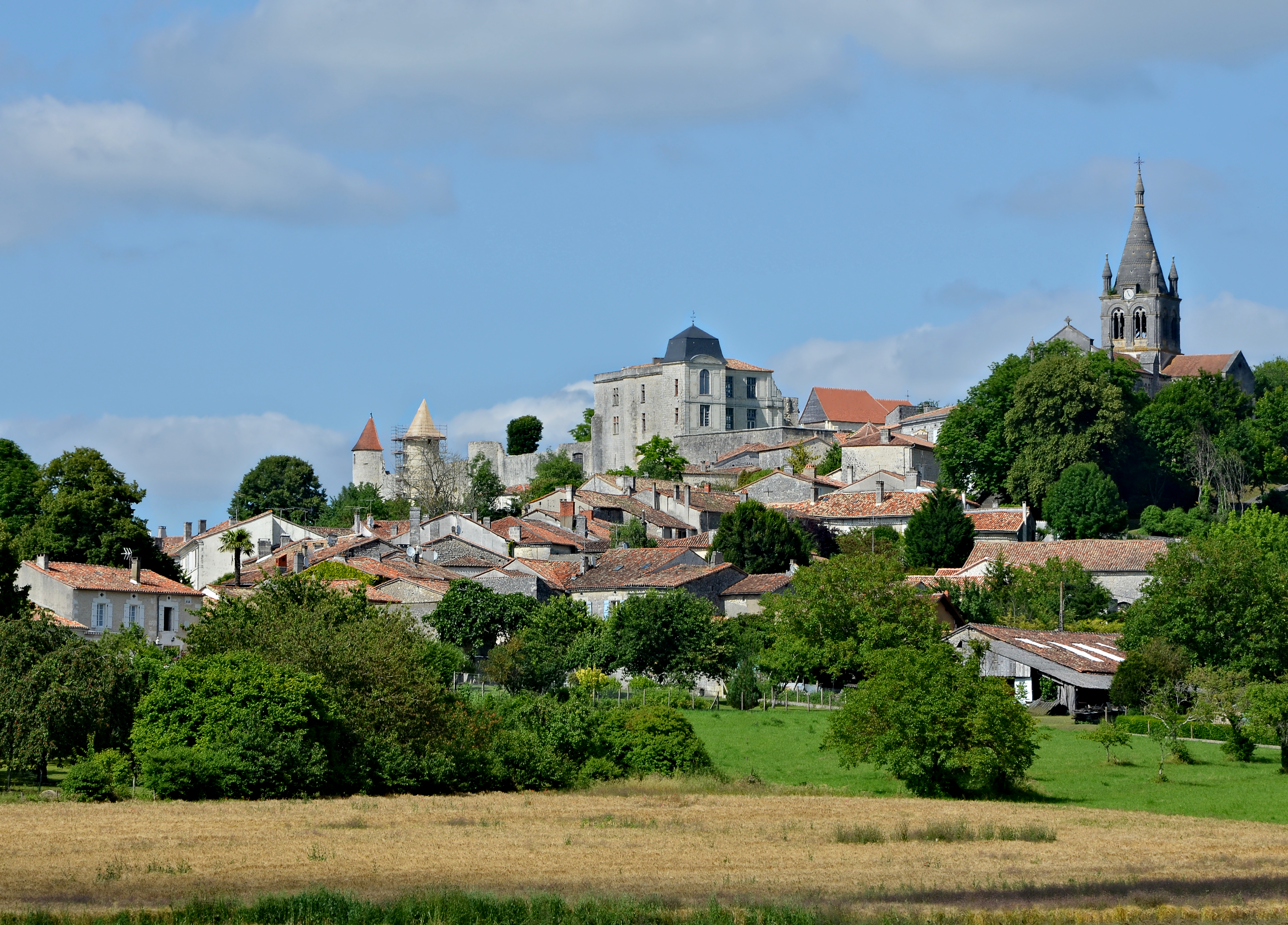
- A general view of Villebois-Lavalette

- Coat of arms
- Location of Villebois-Lavalette
- Location within France Location within Nouvelle-Aquitaine
- Coordinates: 45°29′01″N 0°16′50″E
- Country: France
- Region: Nouvelle-Aquitaine
- Department: Charente
- Arrondissement: Angoulême
- Canton: Tude-et-Lavalette

Government
  - Mayor (2020–2026): Patrick Vergez
- Area^{1}: 7.20 km^{2} (2.78 sq mi)
- Elevation: 192 m (630 ft)
- Highest elevation: 198 m (650 ft)
- Lowest elevation: 103 m (338 ft)
- Population (2023): 717
  - Density: 99.6/km^{2} (258/sq mi)
- Time zone: UTC+01:00 (CET)
  - Summer (DST): UTC+02:00 (CEST)
- INSEE/Postal code: 16408 /16320
- ^{1} French Land Register data, which excludes lakes, ponds, glaciers > 1 km^{2} (0.386 sq mi or 247 acres) and river estuaries.

Villebois-Lavalette (French pronunciation: [vilbwa lavalɛt]) is a commune in the Charente department in southwestern France. It was the seat of the former Canton of Villebois-Lavalette, and is located on a prominent hill which has a château dating back to Roman times.

In the centre of the old town, there is an old wooden covered market that dates back to the 16th century. It was restored in the 19th century and is now a historic monument. There is a small, but lively market every Saturday morning. A 17th-century sundial can be seen on a house that overlooks the market hall.

The town is a reasonably small one with banks, cash machines, newsagent, 2 chemists, 2 boulangeries, a tourism office, garages, a large supermarket, doctors/dentists, builder's supply store, cafe, hotel and restaurant.

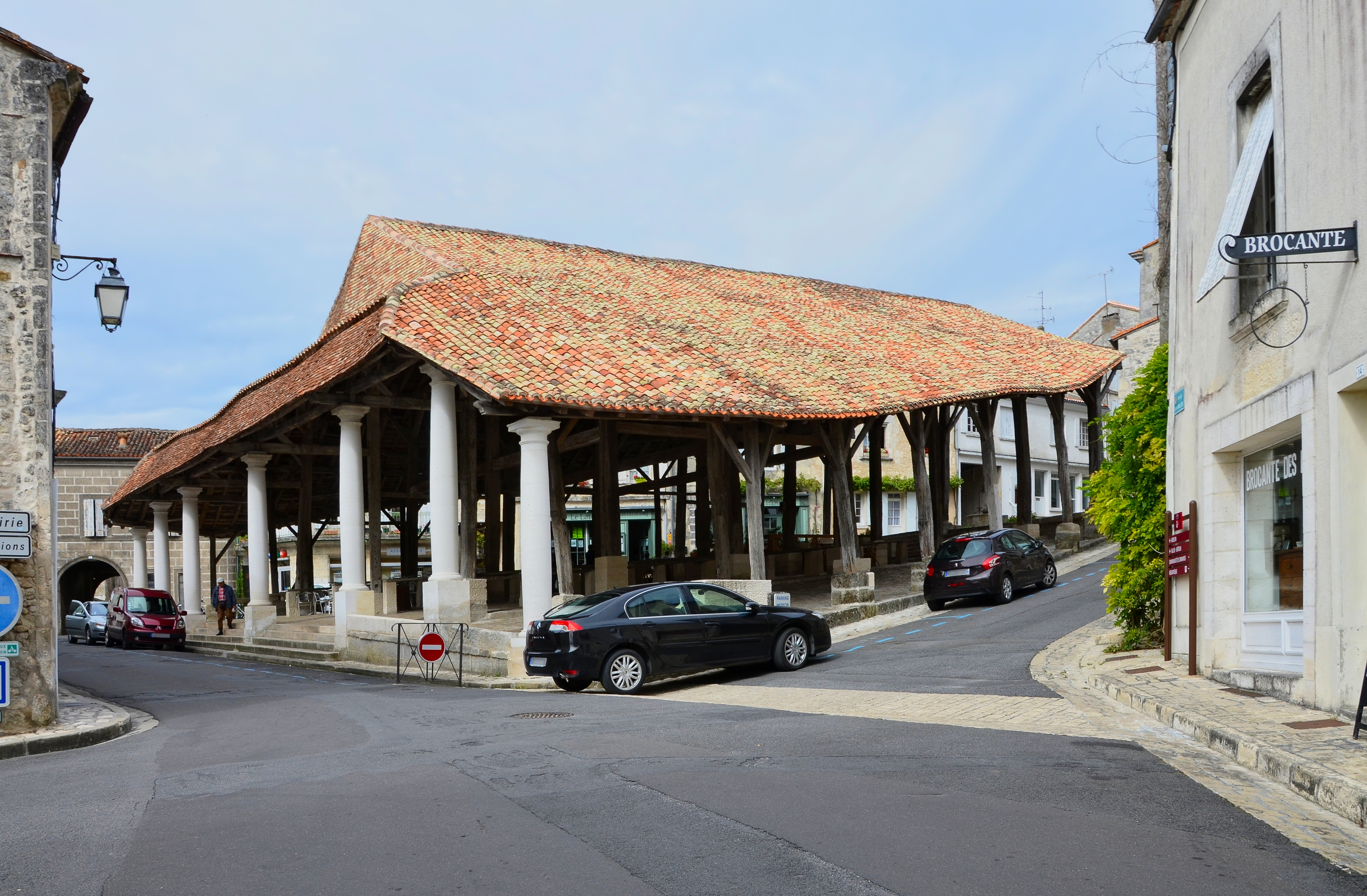
The 17th century covered wooden market on market day

== History ==
The town gets its name from its location on the main Roman road from Périgueux to Saintes. It is thought to be named after a "town located in the woods next to the river Ne" (Ville - town, boisne - wood next to Ne). There is another possible explanation - that it was originally called "Villa bovis" or place of the ox.

The 180-metre-high hill upon which the town and château are now located had been the site of a Gallic oppidum and a Roman castrum until in the 8th century, a château was started to be built by the Fulcher family. It was continued by the Helie family and finally completed in the 12th century by the Ithier family.

Ithier was a powerful lord who participated in the Crusades and erected a Romanesque chapel in the château close to the outside wall that was used by pilgrims of Santiago de Compostela as refuge and accommodation.

In the 13th century, the Lusignan family (the Count of Angoulême), added 2 parts to the primitive chapel, enlarged the château's enclosure and walls, and built 7 towers to turn it into a formidable fortress.

Because of its commanding position, it became a much sought after location. In the Hundred Years' War, the English occupied it until it was reclaimed by the Duke of Berry in 1376. During the Wars of Religion, the town and château was taken by the Protestants until they were overthrown by the Catholics.

In 1589, the Knight of Aubeterre (leader of the League of Angoumois), transformed the château into a garrison for troops. The Duke of Epernon besieged it and forced out the troops by using large canons.

In 1597, Jean Louis de Nogaret de La Valette, Duke of Epernon, Governor of the Angoumois from 1554 to 1642, acquired the land around the town and established it as a duchy under the name of Lavalette. So from 1622 onwards, the town took the name Villebois-Lavalette.

The Duke of Navaille purchased the château in 1660 and rebuilt a princely castle. Only one wall was kept of the original fortress.

During the French Revolution, the château was besieged and damaged. It became an army food storage supply centre and prison. After the revolution it became the main prison for several surrounding departments.

In 1822, a fire destroyed half of the château. Only the north wing and a few sections of the outside wall survived. It was then used as a school until 1912.

From 1914 to 1998, it was owned by the Fleurry family who then sold it in 1998 to a Mr Torres.

It has been partially restored and is now open for visits from May to September.

== Population ==
Historical population
Year	Pop.	±% p.a.
1968	663	—
1975	772	+2.20%
1982	749	−0.43%
1990	765	+0.26%
1999	730	−0.52%
2007	759	+0.49%
2012	740	−0.51%
2017	744	+0.11%
2023	717	−0.61%
Source: INSEE

== See also ==
- Communes of the Charente department
