= Neuillac =

- Commune
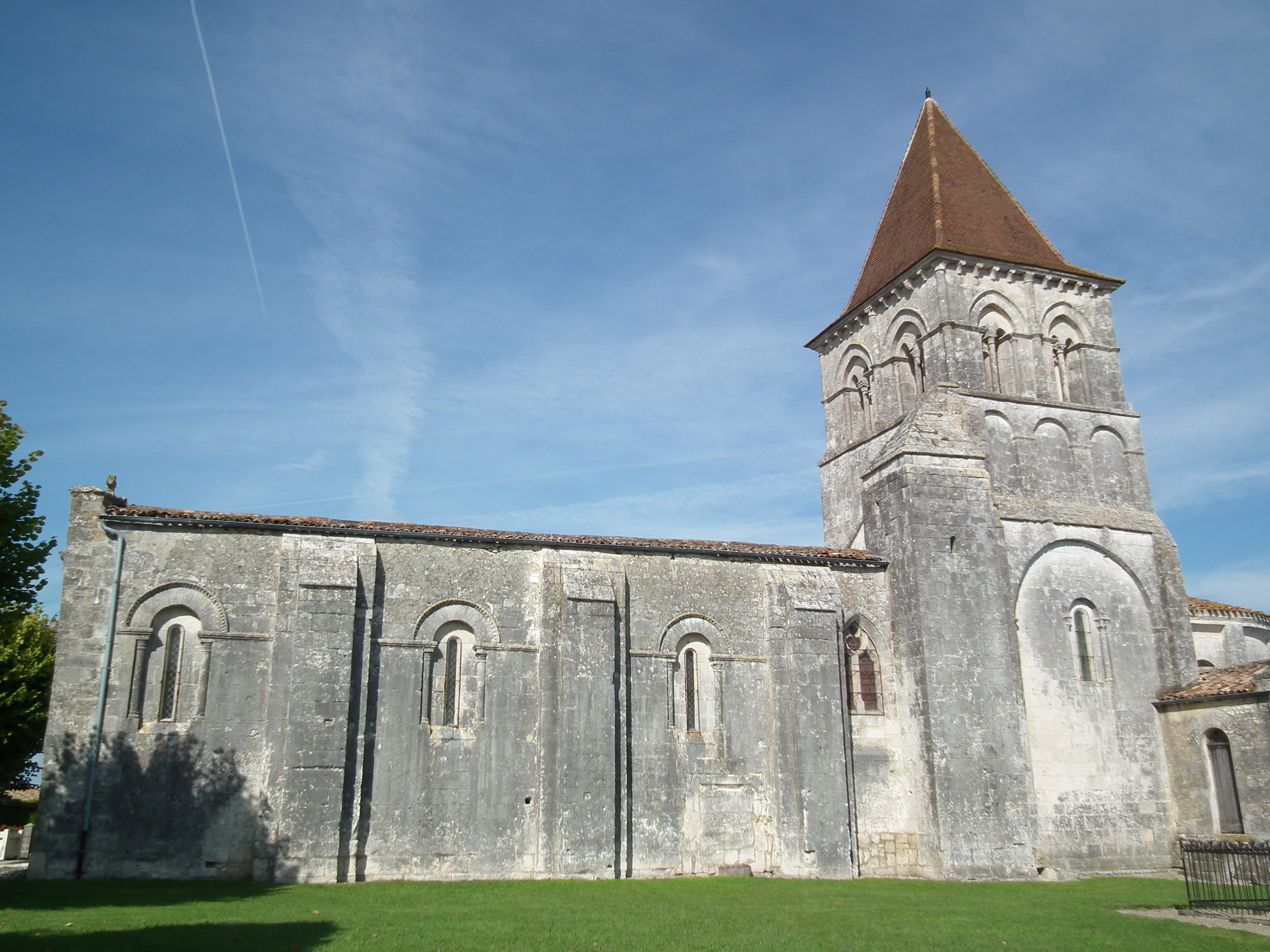
- The church in Neuillac
- Location of Neuillac
- Location within France Location within Nouvelle-Aquitaine
- Coordinates: 45°31′07″N 0°23′51″W
- Country: France
- Region: Nouvelle-Aquitaine
- Department: Charente-Maritime
- Arrondissement: Jonzac
- Canton: Jonzac

Government
  - Mayor (2020–2026): Didier Lefevre-Farcy
- Area^{1}: 10.57 km^{2} (4.08 sq mi)
- Elevation: 40 m (130 ft)
- Highest elevation: 66 m (217 ft)
- Lowest elevation: 28 m (92 ft)
- Population (2023): 321
  - Density: 30.4/km^{2} (78.7/sq mi)
- Time zone: UTC+01:00 (CET)
  - Summer (DST): UTC+02:00 (CEST)
- INSEE/Postal code: 17258 /17520
- ^{1} French Land Register data, which excludes lakes, ponds, glaciers > 1 km^{2} (0.386 sq mi or 247 acres) and river estuaries.

Neuillac (French pronunciation: [nœjak]) is a commune in the Charente-Maritime department in the Nouvelle-Aquitaine region in southwestern France.

== Population ==
Historical population
| Year | Pop. | ±% p.a. |
|---|---|---|
| 1968 | 302 | — |
| 1975 | 286 | −0.77% |
| 1982 | 237 | −2.65% |
| 1990 | 214 | −1.27% |
| 1999 | 258 | +2.10% |
| 2007 | 278 | +0.94% |
| 2012 | 310 | +2.20% |
| 2017 | 302 | −0.52% |
| 2023 | 321 | +1.02% |
Source: INSEE

== See also ==
- Communes of the Charente-Maritime department
