= Ithier =

Ithier may refer to:

== Given name ==
- Ithier of Arles (died 981), French archbishop
- Ithier, Count of Rethel (died 1171), French nobleman

== Surname ==
- Doug Ithier (born 1974), Australian footballer
- Jean-Marc Ithier (born 1965), Mauritian footballer
- Rafael Ithier (1926–2025), Puerto Rican salsa musician
- Vicente Ithier (born 1962), Puerto Rican basketball player
