= Bouteville =

- Commune
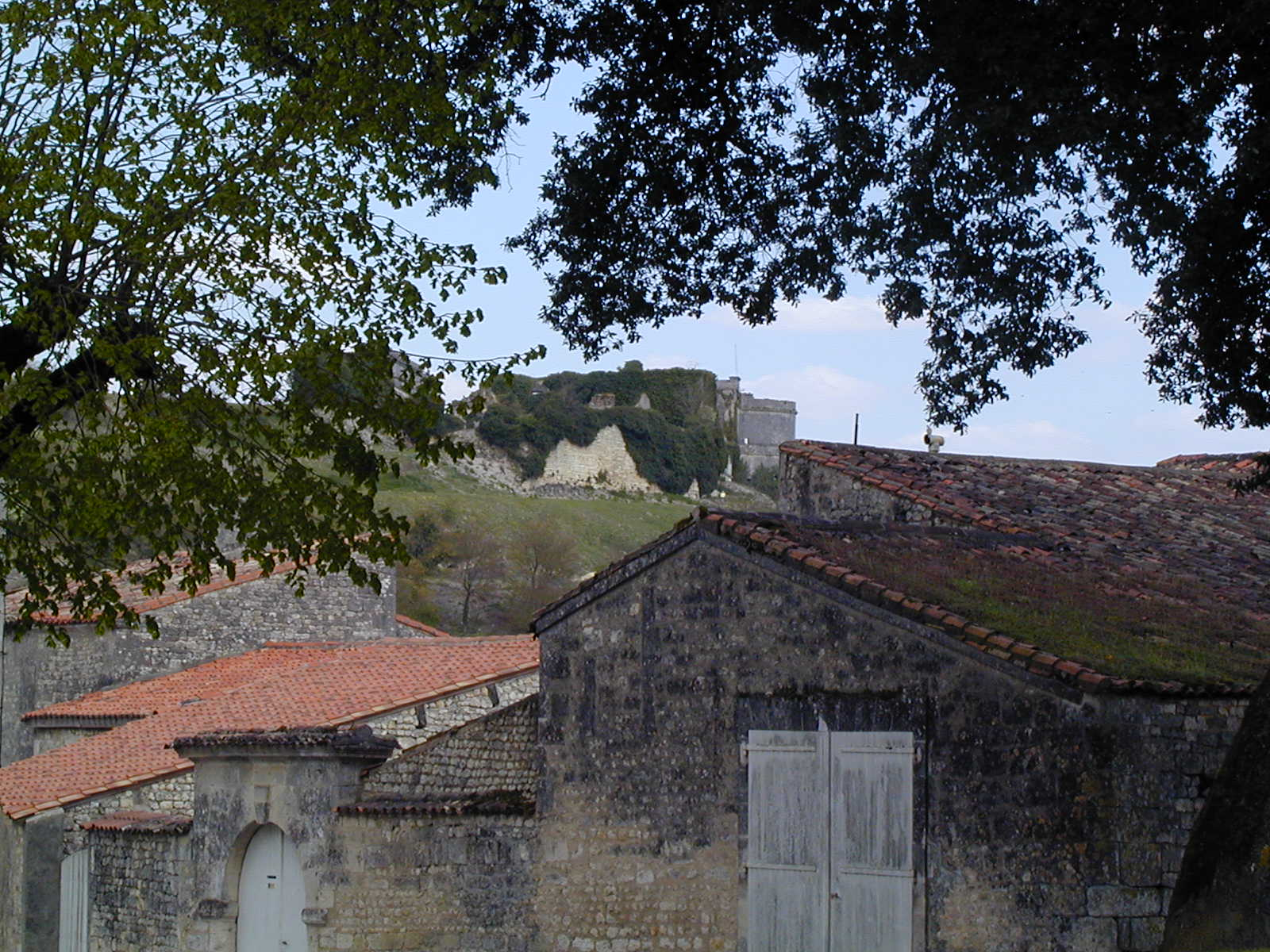
- Chateau

- Coat of arms
- Location of Bouteville
- Location within France Location within Nouvelle-Aquitaine
- Coordinates: 45°36′01″N 0°08′06″W
- Country: France
- Region: Nouvelle-Aquitaine
- Department: Charente
- Arrondissement: Cognac
- Canton: Charente-Champagne
- Intercommunality: CA Grand Cognac

Government
  - Mayor (2020–2026): Jacques Deslias
- Area^{1}: 12.07 km^{2} (4.66 sq mi)
- Elevation: 90 m (300 ft)
- Highest elevation: 152 m (499 ft)
- Lowest elevation: 34 m (112 ft)
- Population (2023): 313
  - Density: 25.9/km^{2} (67.2/sq mi)
- Time zone: UTC+01:00 (CET)
  - Summer (DST): UTC+02:00 (CEST)
- INSEE/Postal code: 16057 /16120
- ^{1} French Land Register data, which excludes lakes, ponds, glaciers > 1 km^{2} (0.386 sq mi or 247 acres) and river estuaries.

Bouteville (French pronunciation: [butvil]) is a commune in the Charente department in southwestern France. It contains the ruins of a medieval castle.

== Population ==
Historical population
Year	Pop.	±% p.a.
1968	459	—
1975	428	−0.99%
1982	388	−1.39%
1990	398	+0.32%
1999	343	−1.64%
2007	337	−0.22%
2012	330	−0.42%
2017	322	−0.49%
2023	313	−0.47%
Source: INSEE

== See also ==
- Communes of the Charente department
