= Chadenac =

- Commune
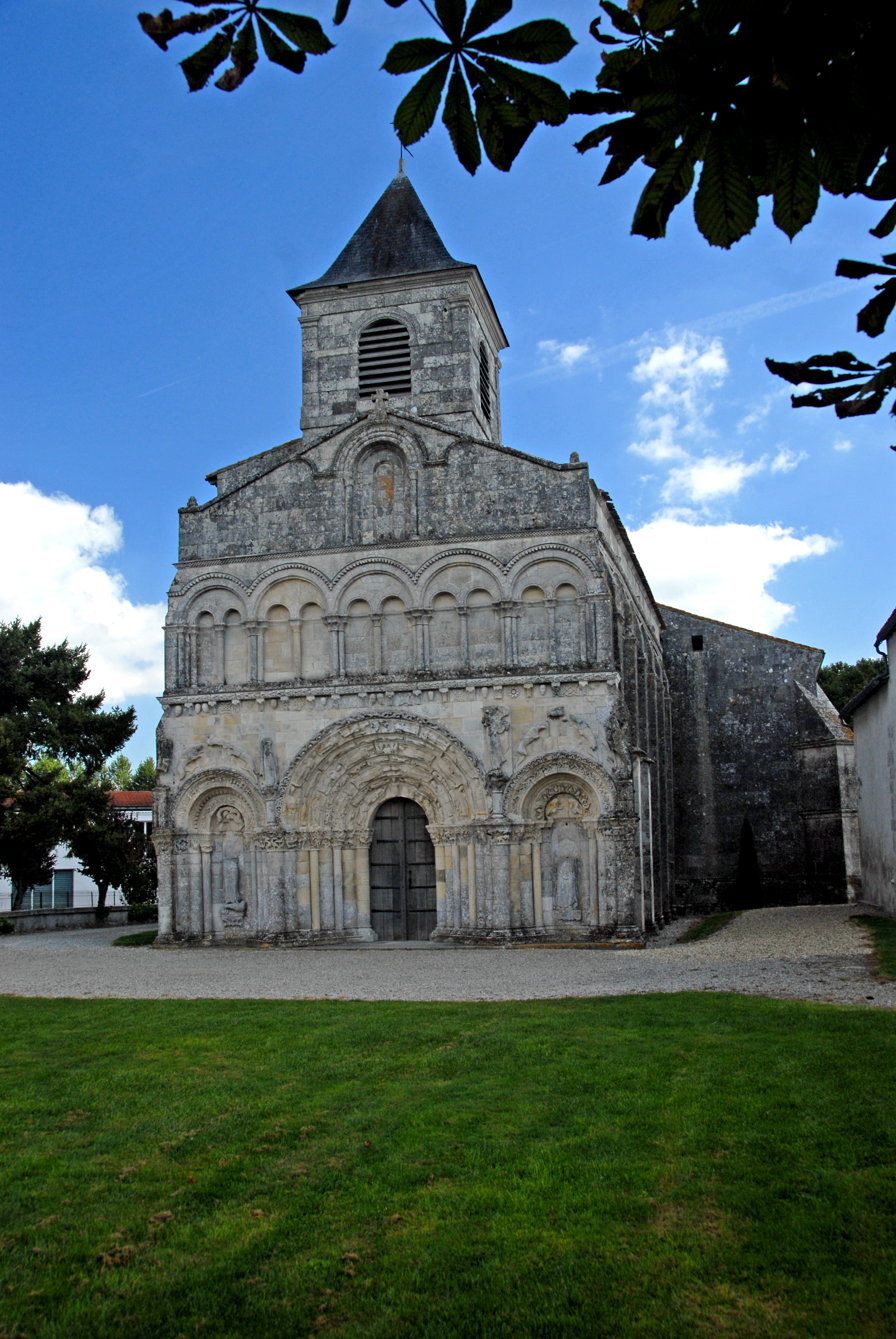
- The church in Chadenac
- Location of Chadenac
- Location within France Location within Nouvelle-Aquitaine
- Coordinates: 45°32′32″N 0°26′27″W
- Country: France
- Region: Nouvelle-Aquitaine
- Department: Charente-Maritime
- Arrondissement: Jonzac
- Canton: Pons
- Intercommunality: Haute-Saintonge

Government
  - Mayor (2020–2026): Patrick Chatelain
- Area^{1}: 14.11 km^{2} (5.45 sq mi)
- Highest elevation: 112 m (367 ft)
- Lowest elevation: 32 m (105 ft)
- Population (2023): 518
  - Density: 36.7/km^{2} (95.1/sq mi)
- Time zone: UTC+01:00 (CET)
  - Summer (DST): UTC+02:00 (CEST)
- INSEE/Postal code: 17078 /17800
- ^{1} French Land Register data, which excludes lakes, ponds, glaciers > 1 km^{2} (0.386 sq mi or 247 acres) and river estuaries.

Chadenac (French pronunciation: [ʃadnak]) is a commune in the Charente-Maritime department in the Nouvelle-Aquitaine region, in the former province of Saintonge in southwestern France. Chadenac has a notable romanesque church and a small museum containing Merovingian and Roman artefacts. It lies 8 km from Jonzac and 9 km from Pons off the D142 road, close to the Way of St. James.

== Population ==
Historical population
Year	Pop.	±% p.a.
1968	531	—
1975	473	−1.64%
1982	429	−1.39%
1990	424	−0.15%
1999	425	+0.03%
2007	410	−0.45%
2012	425	+0.72%
2017	498	+3.22%
2023	518	+0.66%
Source: INSEE

Inhabitants are known as Chadenacais (M) and Chadenacaises (F) in French.

== See also ==
- Communes of the Charente-Maritime department
