= Gensac-la-Pallue =

- Commune
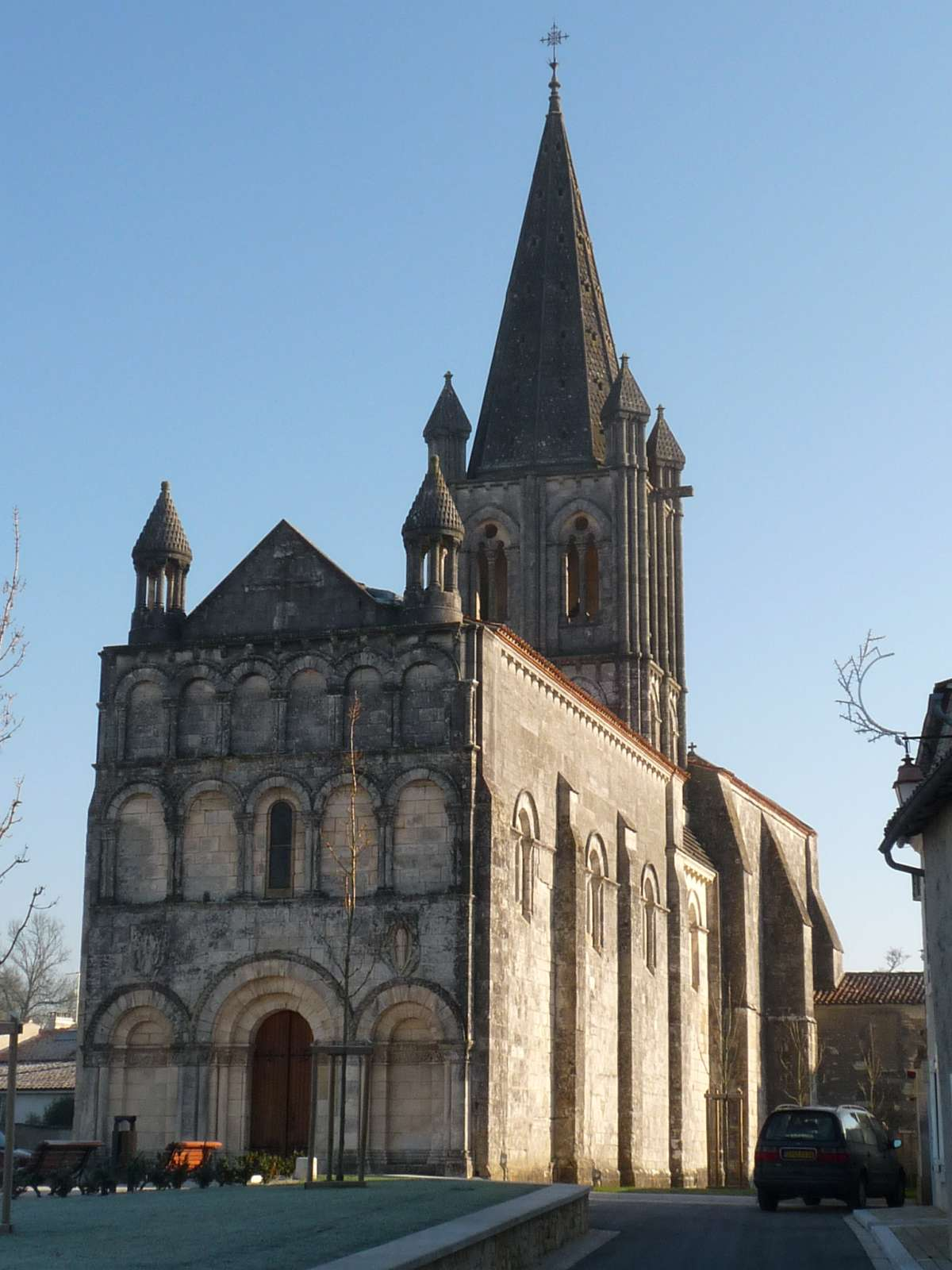
- The church in Gensac-la-Pallue

- Coat of arms
- Location of Gensac-la-Pallue
- Location within France Location within Nouvelle-Aquitaine
- Coordinates: 45°39′06″N 0°15′05″W
- Country: France
- Region: Nouvelle-Aquitaine
- Department: Charente
- Arrondissement: Cognac
- Canton: Charente-Champagne
- Intercommunality: CA Grand Cognac

Government
  - Mayor (2022–2026): Cédric Dupuy
- Area^{1}: 19.23 km^{2} (7.42 sq mi)
- Elevation: 23 m (75 ft)
- Highest elevation: 50 m (160 ft)
- Lowest elevation: 7 m (23 ft)
- Population (2023): 1,627
  - Density: 84.61/km^{2} (219.1/sq mi)
- Time zone: UTC+01:00 (CET)
  - Summer (DST): UTC+02:00 (CEST)
- INSEE/Postal code: 16150 /16130
- ^{1} French Land Register data, which excludes lakes, ponds, glaciers > 1 km^{2} (0.386 sq mi or 247 acres) and river estuaries.

Gensac-la-Pallue (French pronunciation: [ʒɑ̃sak la paly]) is a commune in the Charente department in southwestern France.

== Population ==
Historical population
Year	Pop.	±% p.a.
1968	979	—
1975	1,297	+4.10%
1982	1,613	+3.16%
1990	1,701	+0.67%
1999	1,613	−0.59%
2007	1,604	−0.07%
2012	1,603	−0.01%
2017	1,549	−0.68%
2023	1,627	+0.82%
Source: INSEE

== See also ==
- Communes of the Charente department
