= Brossac =

- Commune
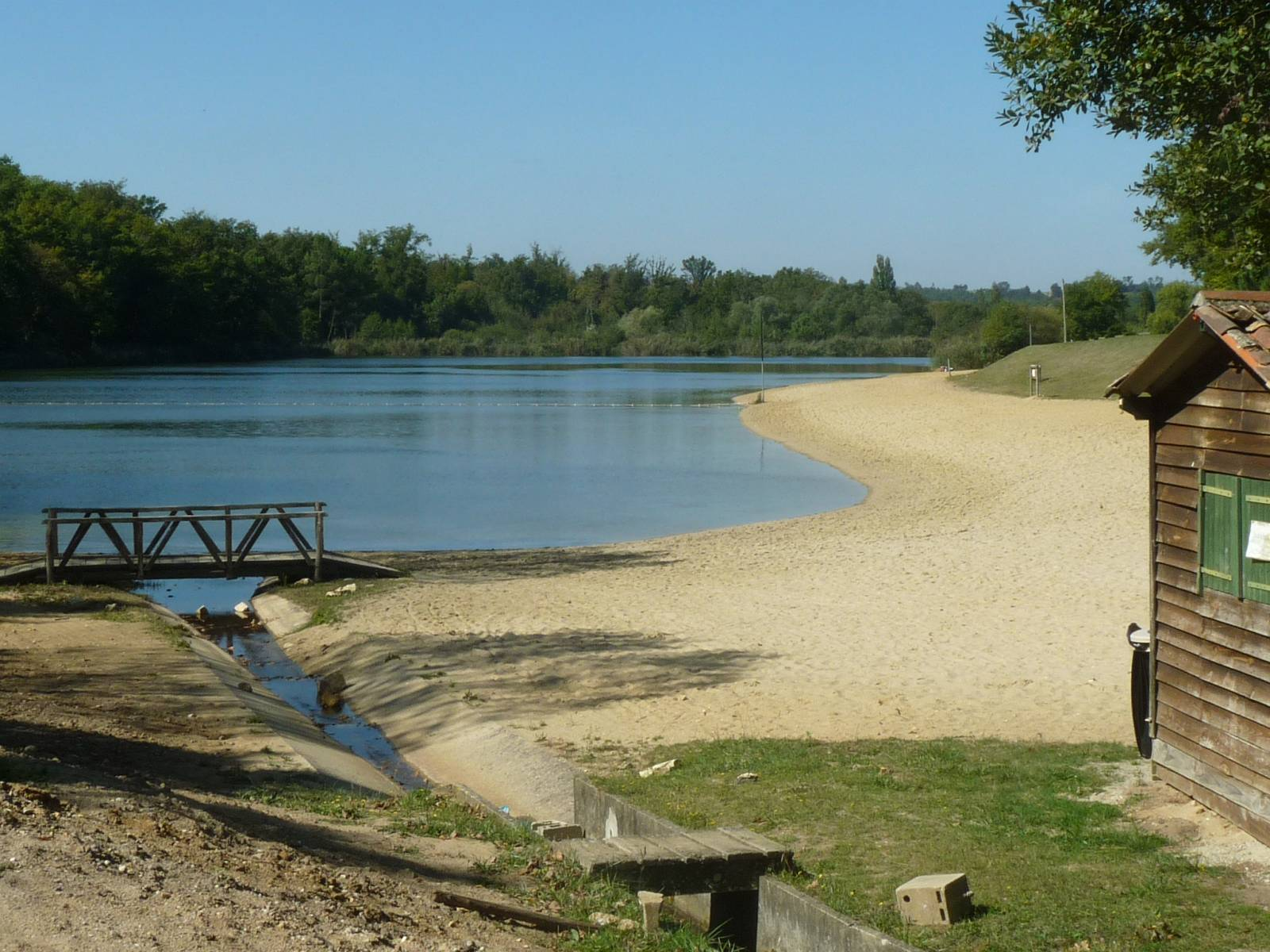
- Vallier Pond
- Location of Brossac
- Location within France Location within Nouvelle-Aquitaine
- Coordinates: 45°19′56″N 0°02′36″W
- Country: France
- Region: Nouvelle-Aquitaine
- Department: Charente
- Arrondissement: Cognac
- Canton: Charente-Sud
- Intercommunality: 4B Sud-Charente

Government
  - Mayor (2020–2026): Didier Maudet
- Area^{1}: 21.84 km^{2} (8.43 sq mi)
- Elevation: 159 m (522 ft)
- Highest elevation: 184 m (604 ft)
- Lowest elevation: 75 m (246 ft)
- Population (2023): 482
  - Density: 22.1/km^{2} (57.2/sq mi)
- Time zone: UTC+01:00 (CET)
  - Summer (DST): UTC+02:00 (CEST)
- INSEE/Postal code: 16066 /16480
- ^{1} French Land Register data, which excludes lakes, ponds, glaciers > 1 km^{2} (0.386 sq mi or 247 acres) and river estuaries.

Brossac (French pronunciation: [bʁɔsak]) is a commune in the Charente department in southwestern France.

== Population ==
Historical population
Year	Pop.	±% p.a.
1968	778	—
1975	679	−1.93%
1982	635	−0.95%
1990	593	−0.85%
1999	524	−1.37%
2007	549	+0.58%
2012	520	−1.08%
2017	486	−1.34%
2023	482	−0.14%
Source: INSEE

== Castle of Brossac ==
The written sources describing defensive functions of that premises dates back to the early Middle Ages. The castle was to control the surrounding fiefs and a former Romanian road Saintes – Périgueux – Cahors. Dating from the old Middle Ages the premises and the castle as a part of a Durfort's fief were in a possession of Vigier de La Cour Family. Nextly, in 1725 the premises and the castle fell under the rule of de Lafaye Family. The family started to use an epithet Bourgoin after the location name. During the French Revolution in 1789, Pierre de Lafaye du Bourgoin hold a position of a lawyer in Bordeoux Parliament, a seneschal judge in Brossac. In 1874 Pierre-François de Lafaye du Bourgoin re – constructed the small castle into a manor house in the style of Napoleon the 3rd. Lately, there was an artist painter, Mrs. Alexandra Blonde, who lived there.
