= Guimps =

- Commune
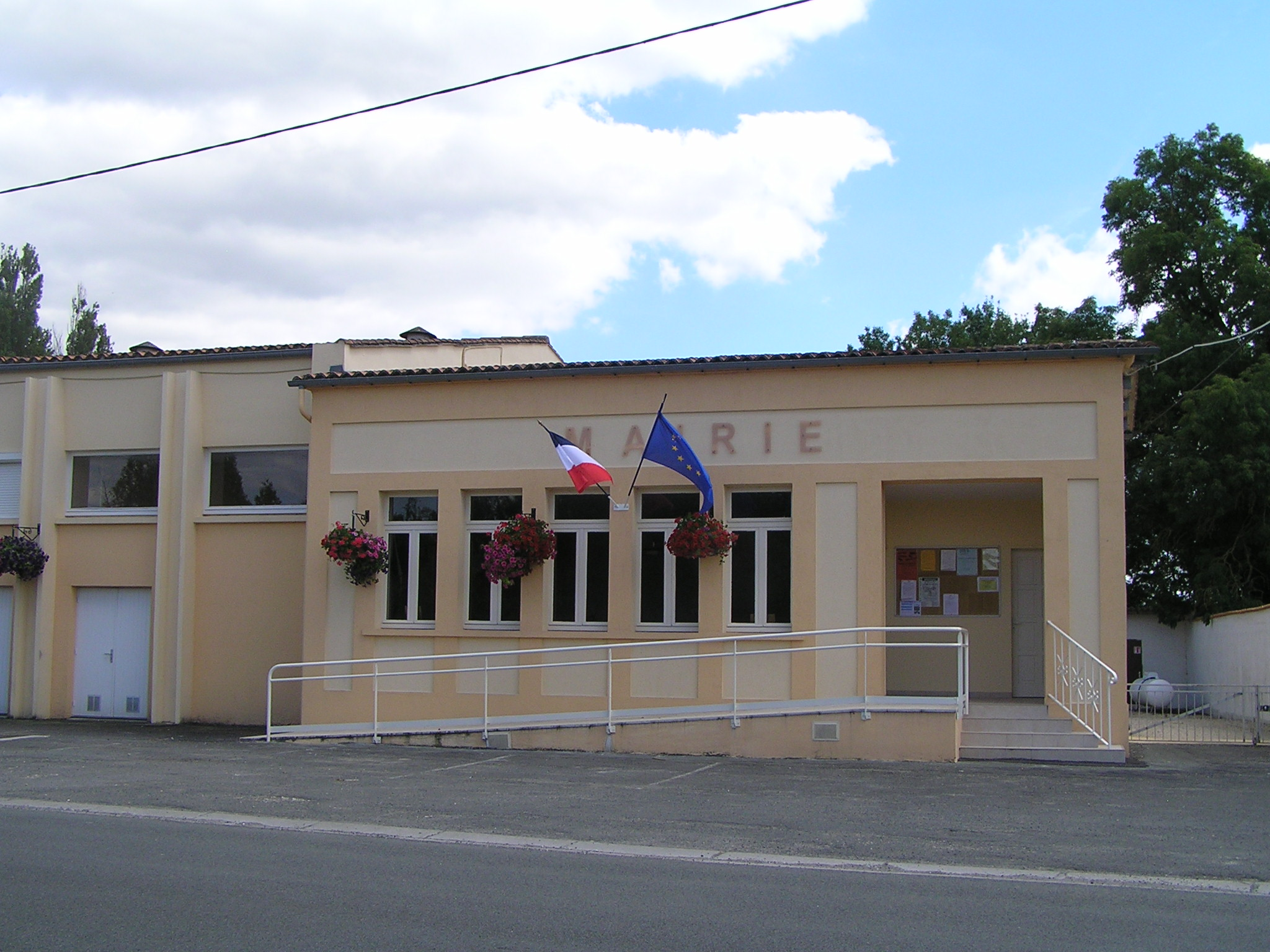
- Town hall
- Location of Guimps
- Location within France Location within Nouvelle-Aquitaine
- Coordinates: 45°27′51″N 0°14′45″W
- Country: France
- Region: Nouvelle-Aquitaine
- Department: Charente
- Arrondissement: Cognac
- Canton: Charente-Sud

Government
  - Mayor (2020–2026): Line Baudouin
- Area^{1}: 12.60 km^{2} (4.86 sq mi)
- Elevation: 76 m (249 ft)
- Highest elevation: 108 m (354 ft)
- Lowest elevation: 49 m (161 ft)
- Population (2023): 497
  - Density: 39.4/km^{2} (102/sq mi)
- Time zone: UTC+01:00 (CET)
  - Summer (DST): UTC+02:00 (CEST)
- INSEE/Postal code: 16160 /16300
- ^{1} French Land Register data, which excludes lakes, ponds, glaciers > 1 km^{2} (0.386 sq mi or 247 acres) and river estuaries.

Guimps (French pronunciation: [ɡɛ̃]) is a commune in the Charente department in southwestern France.

== Population ==
Historical population
Year	Pop.	±% p.a.
1968	603	—
1975	546	−1.41%
1982	478	−1.88%
1990	508	+0.76%
1999	495	−0.29%
2007	498	+0.08%
2012	474	−0.98%
2017	477	+0.13%
2023	497	+0.69%
Source: INSEE

== See also ==
- Communes of the Charente department
