= Cherves-Richemont =

- Part of Val-de-Cognac
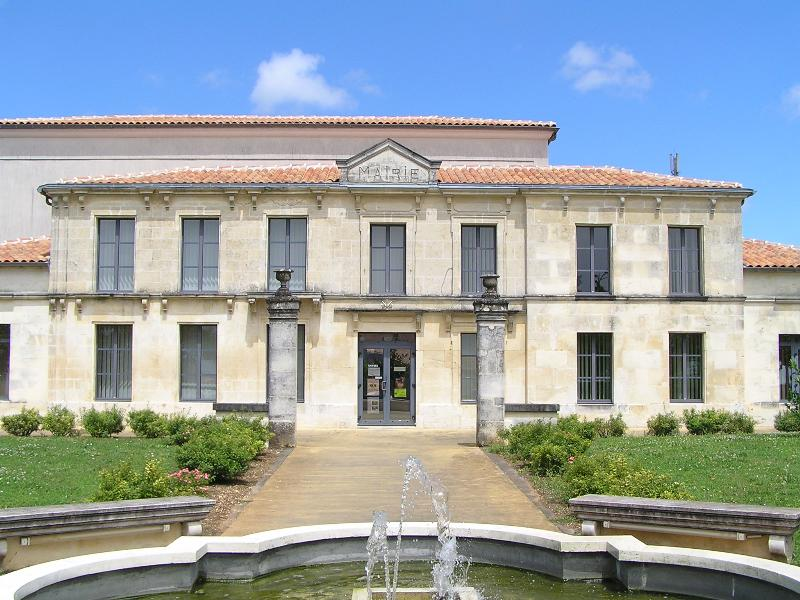
- Town hall

- Coat of arms
- Location of Cherves-Richemont
- Location within France Location within Nouvelle-Aquitaine
- Coordinates: 45°44′39″N 0°21′07″W
- Country: France
- Region: Nouvelle-Aquitaine
- Department: Charente
- Arrondissement: Cognac
- Canton: Cognac-1
- Commune: Val-de-Cognac
- Area^{1}: 37.94 km^{2} (14.65 sq mi)
- Elevation: 28 m (92 ft)
- Highest elevation: 73 m (240 ft)
- Lowest elevation: 5 m (16 ft)
- Population (2021): 2,285
  - Density: 60.23/km^{2} (156.0/sq mi)
- Time zone: UTC+01:00 (CET)
  - Summer (DST): UTC+02:00 (CEST)
- Postal code: 16370
- ^{1} French Land Register data, which excludes lakes, ponds, glaciers > 1 km^{2} (0.386 sq mi or 247 acres) and river estuaries.

Cherves-Richemont (French pronunciation: [ʃɛʁv ʁiʃmɔ̃]) is a former commune in the Charente department in southwestern France. It was formed by the merger of Cherves-de-Cognac (before 1956: Cherves) with Richemont in January 1973. On 1 January 2024, it was merged into the new commune of Val-de-Cognac.

== Population ==
Population of Cherves
Year	Pop.	±%
1800	985	—
1841	1,523	+54.6%
1866	2,120	+39.2%
1886	1,813	−14.5%
1901	2,355	+29.9%
1921	1,759	−25.3%
1936	1,565	−11.0%
1954	1,854	+18.5%
1962	2,082	+12.3%
1968	2,093	+0.5%

Population of Richemont
Year	Pop.	±%
1800	163	—
1841	289	+77.3%
1866	412	+42.6%
1886	382	−7.3%
1901	420	+9.9%
1921	323	−23.1%
1936	355	+9.9%
1954	317	−10.7%
1962	296	−6.6%
1968	272	−8.1%

Population of Cherves-Richemont
Year	Pop.	±% p.a.
1975	2,602	—
1982	2,665	+0.34%
1990	2,528	−0.66%
1999	2,447	−0.36%
2007	2,437	−0.05%
2012	2,433	−0.03%
2017	2,344	−0.74%
Source: INSEE

== See also ==
- Communes of the Charente department
