= Gérald Guillemin =

French organ builder (1948–2026)

- Born: 1948; Paris, France
- Died: 13 July 2026 (aged 77–78)
- Occupation: Organ builder

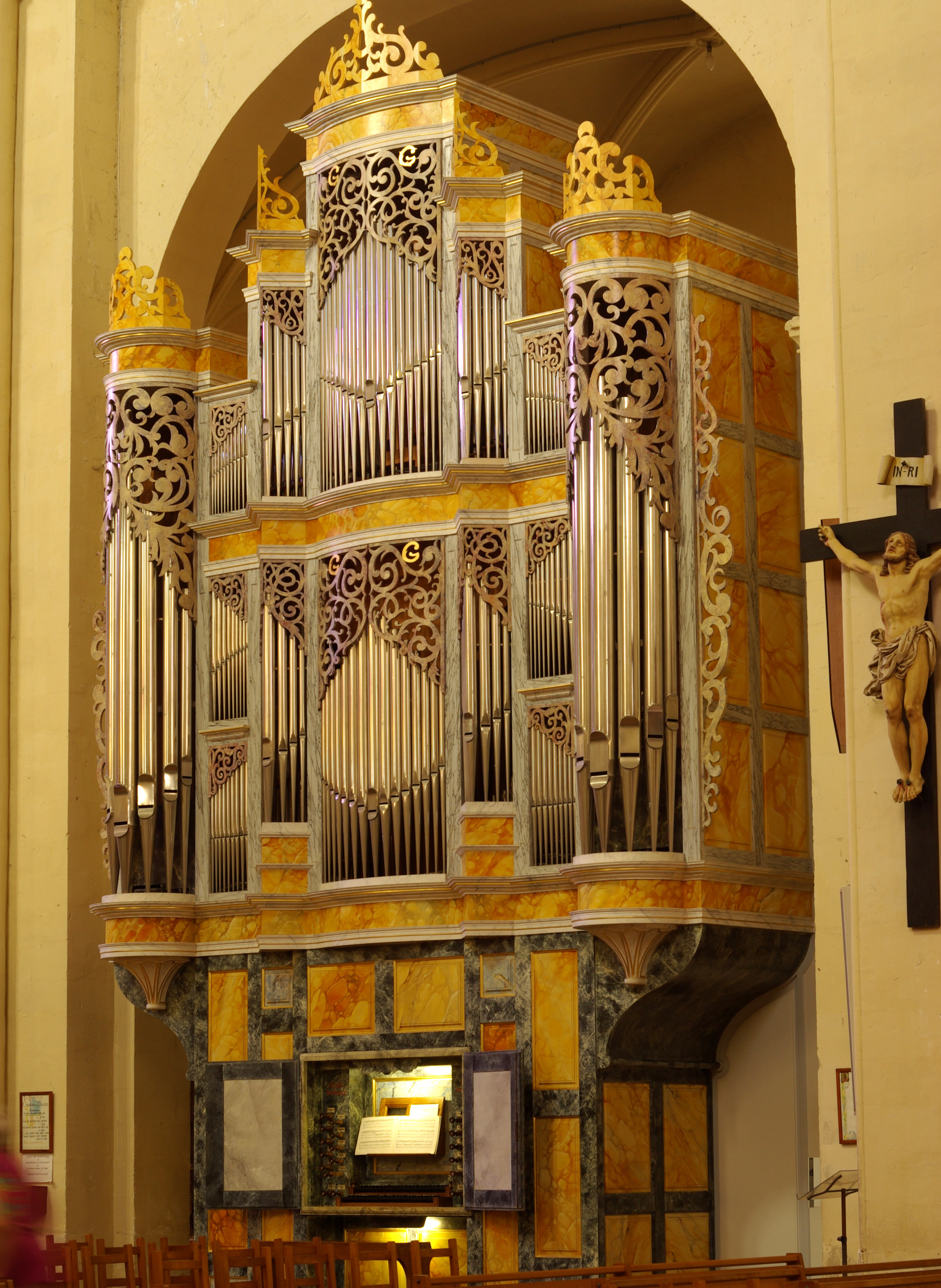
Orgue Guillemin at the Église Saint-Pierre et Saint-Paul in Chavagnes-en-Paillers.

Gérald Guillemin (French: [ʒeʁˈald ɡijmˈɛ̃]; 1948 – 13 July 2026) was a French organ builder.

Guillemin established his organ-building business in Malaucène in 1976, building organs for churches in Montpellier, Chavagnes-en-Paillers, Aubusson, Wasquehal, and Mérignac.

Guillemin died on 13 July 2026.
