= Fleurac =

Fleurac may refer to the following places in France:

- Fleurac, Charente, a commune of the Charente département
- Fleurac, Dordogne, a commune of the Dordogne département
