= Mainxe =

Commune in Charente, France

- Part of Mainxe-Gondeville
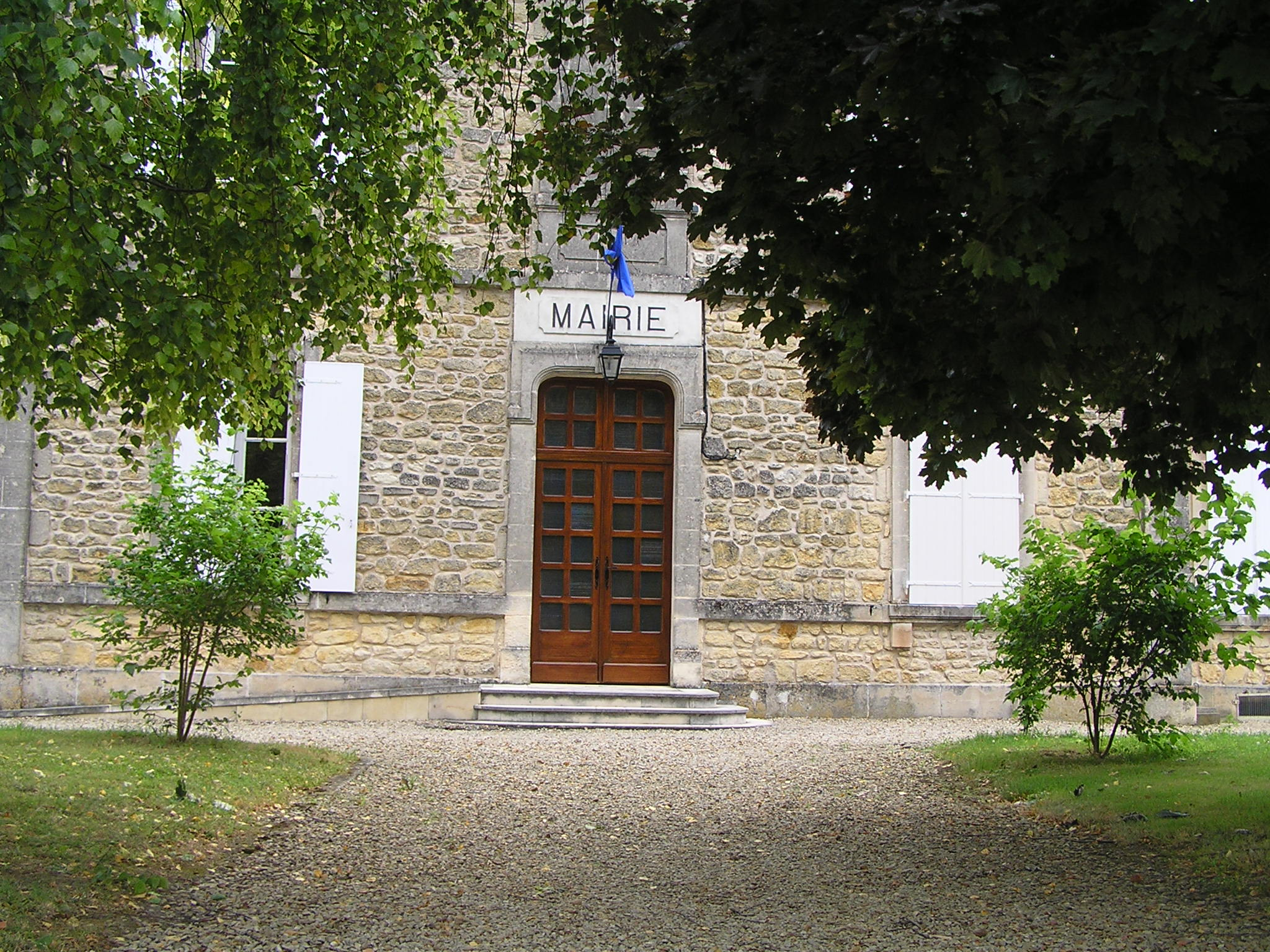
- Town hall
- Location of Mainxe
- Location within France Location within Nouvelle-Aquitaine
- Coordinates: 45°38′34″N 0°11′17″W
- Country: France
- Region: Nouvelle-Aquitaine
- Department: Charente
- Arrondissement: Cognac
- Canton: Jarnac
- Commune: Mainxe-Gondeville
- Area^{1}: 10.10 km^{2} (3.90 sq mi)
- Highest elevation: 58 m (190 ft)
- Lowest elevation: 9 m (30 ft)
- Population (2023): 682
  - Density: 67.5/km^{2} (175/sq mi)
- Time zone: UTC+01:00 (CET)
  - Summer (DST): UTC+02:00 (CEST)
- Postal code: 16200
- ^{1} French Land Register data, which excludes lakes, ponds, glaciers > 1 km^{2} (0.386 sq mi or 247 acres) and river estuaries.

Mainxe (French pronunciation: [mɛ̃ks]) is a former commune in the Charente department in southwestern France. On 1 January 2019, it was merged into the new commune Mainxe-Gondeville.

== See also ==
- Communes of the Charente department
