= Boisbreteau =

- Commune
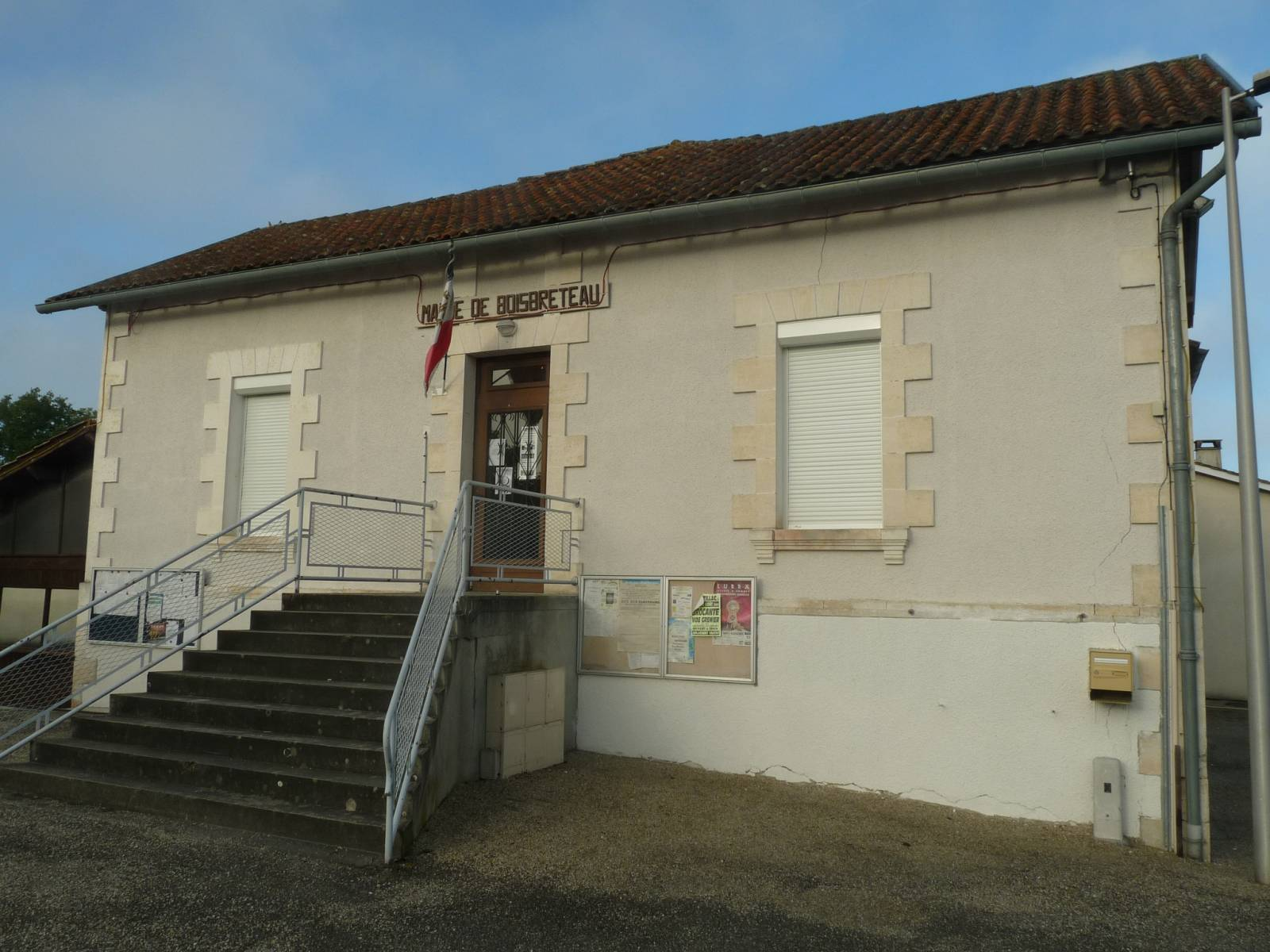
- Town hall
- Location of Boisbreteau
- Location within France Location within Nouvelle-Aquitaine
- Coordinates: 45°19′27″N 0°09′03″W
- Country: France
- Region: Nouvelle-Aquitaine
- Department: Charente
- Arrondissement: Cognac
- Canton: Charente-Sud

Government
  - Mayor (2020–2026): Gaël Tétoin
- Area^{1}: 15.16 km^{2} (5.85 sq mi)
- Elevation: 150 m (490 ft)
- Highest elevation: 157 m (515 ft)
- Lowest elevation: 79 m (259 ft)
- Population (2023): 136
  - Density: 8.97/km^{2} (23.2/sq mi)
- Time zone: UTC+01:00 (CET)
  - Summer (DST): UTC+02:00 (CEST)
- INSEE/Postal code: 16048 /16480
- ^{1} French Land Register data, which excludes lakes, ponds, glaciers > 1 km^{2} (0.386 sq mi or 247 acres) and river estuaries.

Boisbreteau (French pronunciation: [bwabʁəto]) is a commune in the Charente department in southwestern France.

== History ==
The first church was built prior to Boisbreteau 9th century, destroyed in the 14th century, repaired in the 15th century and banned in 1784 on the eve of the Revolution.

A priory was built in the 13th century. The foundation of the priory of Cluniac Notre Dame Boisbreteau date is unknown but a licensee Wilelmus mentioned in 1270.

While the Hundred Years' War ravaged the kingdom of France since 1337 and especially since the English naval victory at Sluys in 1340, from the late 14th century, the priory of Cluniac finds himself ruined by the English and was purely and simply deleted. It was at this time that the parish became part of Boisbreteau priory of Saint-Vivien Saintes.

The research has assumed that the Priory was probably the site of the present church of St. Macrina.

In the 15th century the land belonged to the family Boibreteau Frondebœuf until marriage to Isabella of Frondebœuf Curzay with John, Lord of Parsay July 18, 1491 and is still by marriage they spent in 1609 to Bring the family The Wolf and the Rocquart, then to the Stone-Saulnier Closure lords Rouillac, Gondeville Sonneville Boisbreteau, and other places.

== Population ==
Historical population
Year	Pop.	±% p.a.
1968	182	—
1975	174	−0.64%
1982	153	−1.82%
1990	148	−0.41%
1999	122	−2.12%
2007	124	+0.20%
2012	126	+0.32%
2017	136	+1.54%
2023	136	+0.00%
Source: INSEE

== See also ==
- Communes of the Charente department
