= Saint-Sulpice-de-Cognac =

- Part of Val-de-Cognac
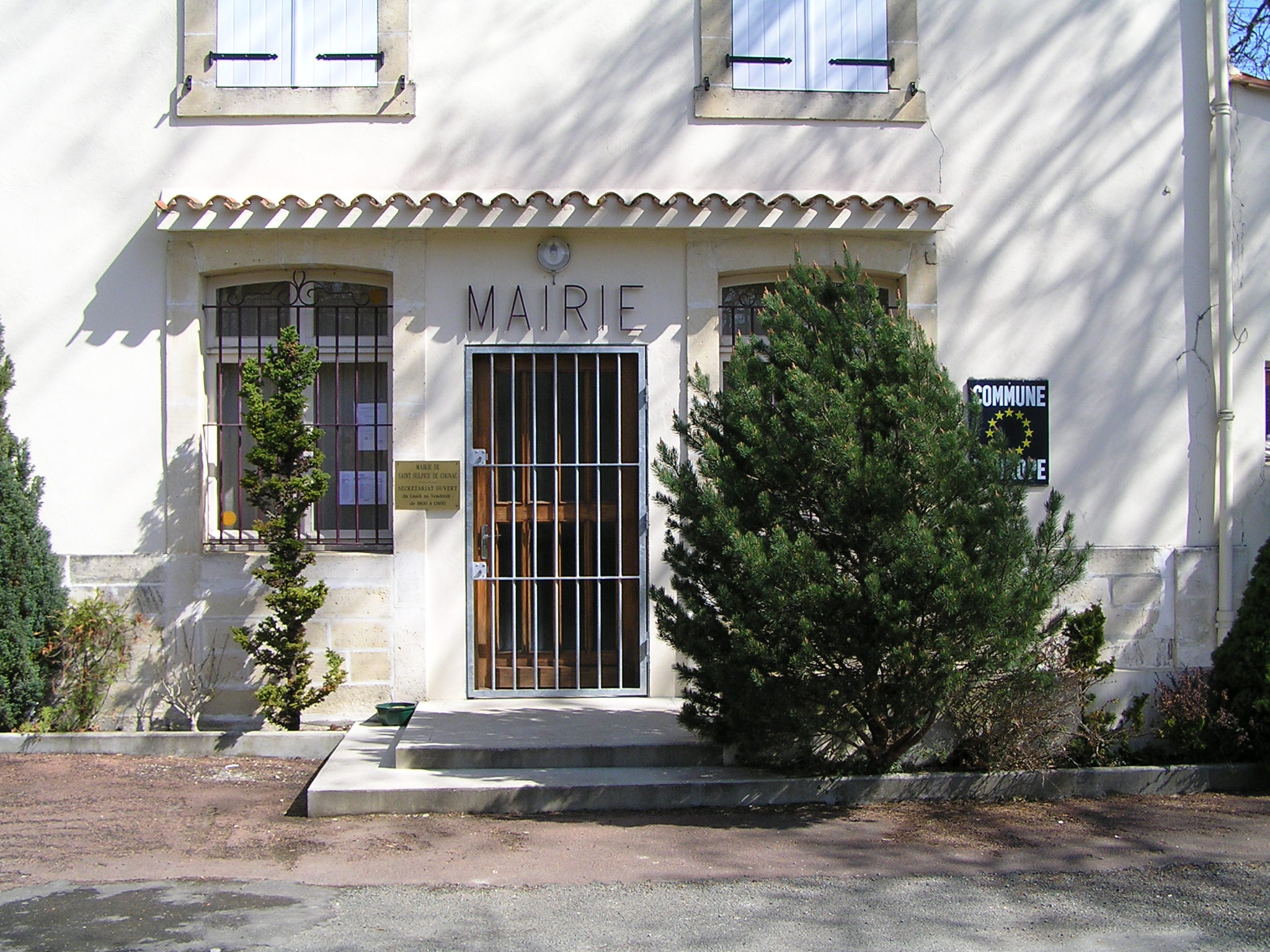
- Town hall
- Location of Saint-Sulpice-de-Cognac
- Location within France Location within Nouvelle-Aquitaine
- Coordinates: 45°45′38″N 0°22′51″W
- Country: France
- Region: Nouvelle-Aquitaine
- Department: Charente
- Arrondissement: Cognac
- Canton: Cognac-1
- Commune: Val-de-Cognac
- Area^{1}: 23.82 km^{2} (9.20 sq mi)
- Elevation: 40 m (130 ft)
- Highest elevation: 104 m (341 ft)
- Lowest elevation: 10 m (33 ft)
- Population (2021): 1,183
  - Density: 49.66/km^{2} (128.6/sq mi)
- Time zone: UTC+01:00 (CET)
  - Summer (DST): UTC+02:00 (CEST)
- Postal code: 16370
- ^{1} French Land Register data, which excludes lakes, ponds, glaciers > 1 km^{2} (0.386 sq mi or 247 acres) and river estuaries.

Saint-Sulpice-de-Cognac (French pronunciation: [sɛ̃ sylpis də kɔɲak], lit. 'Saint-Sulpice of Cognac') is a former commune in the Charente department in the Nouvelle-Aquitaine region in southwestern France. On 1 January 2024, it was merged into the new commune of Val-de-Cognac.

== Population ==
Historical population
Year	Pop.	±% p.a.
1968	1,004	—
1975	1,009	+0.07%
1982	1,119	+1.49%
1990	1,206	+0.94%
1999	1,193	−0.12%
2009	1,275	+0.67%
2014	1,252	−0.36%
2020	1,186	−0.90%
Source: INSEE

Its inhabitants are known as Saint-Sulpiciens and Saint-Sulpiciennes in French.

== Climate ==
Saint-Sulpice-de-Cognac, as the whole region of Cognac, is located in the western part of the department of Charente and has a marine climate.

== See also ==
- Communes of the Charente department
