= Chassors =

- Commune
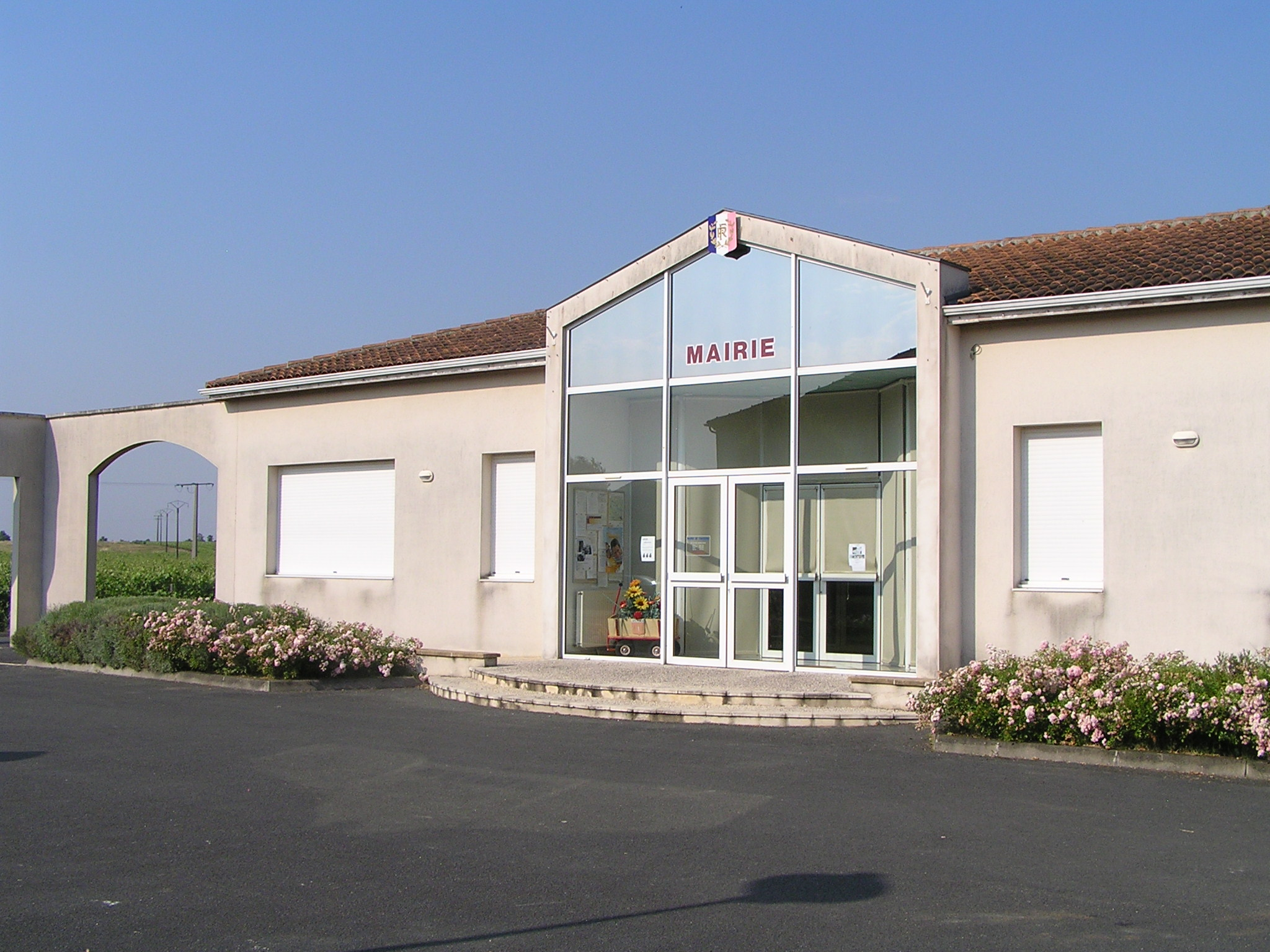
- Town hall

- Coat of arms
- Location of Chassors
- Location within France Location within Nouvelle-Aquitaine
- Coordinates: 45°42′43″N 0°12′07″W
- Country: France
- Region: Nouvelle-Aquitaine
- Department: Charente
- Arrondissement: Cognac
- Canton: Jarnac
- Intercommunality: CA Grand Cognac

Government
  - Mayor (2020–2026): Patrick Lafarge
- Area^{1}: 13.21 km^{2} (5.10 sq mi)
- Elevation: 43 m (141 ft)
- Highest elevation: 62 m (203 ft)
- Lowest elevation: 13 m (43 ft)
- Population (2023): 1,123
  - Density: 85.01/km^{2} (220.2/sq mi)
- Time zone: UTC+01:00 (CET)
  - Summer (DST): UTC+02:00 (CEST)
- INSEE/Postal code: 16088 /16200
- ^{1} French Land Register data, which excludes lakes, ponds, glaciers > 1 km^{2} (0.386 sq mi or 247 acres) and river estuaries.

Chassors (French pronunciation: [ʃasɔʁ]) is a commune in the Charente department in southwestern France.

== Population ==
Historical population
Year	Pop.	±% p.a.
1968	823	—
1975	911	+1.46%
1982	1,014	+1.54%
1990	1,105	+1.08%
1999	1,061	−0.45%
2007	1,104	+0.50%
2012	1,123	+0.34%
2017	1,102	−0.38%
2023	1,123	+0.32%
Source: INSEE

== See also ==
- Communes of the Charente department
