= Louzac-Saint-André =

- Commune
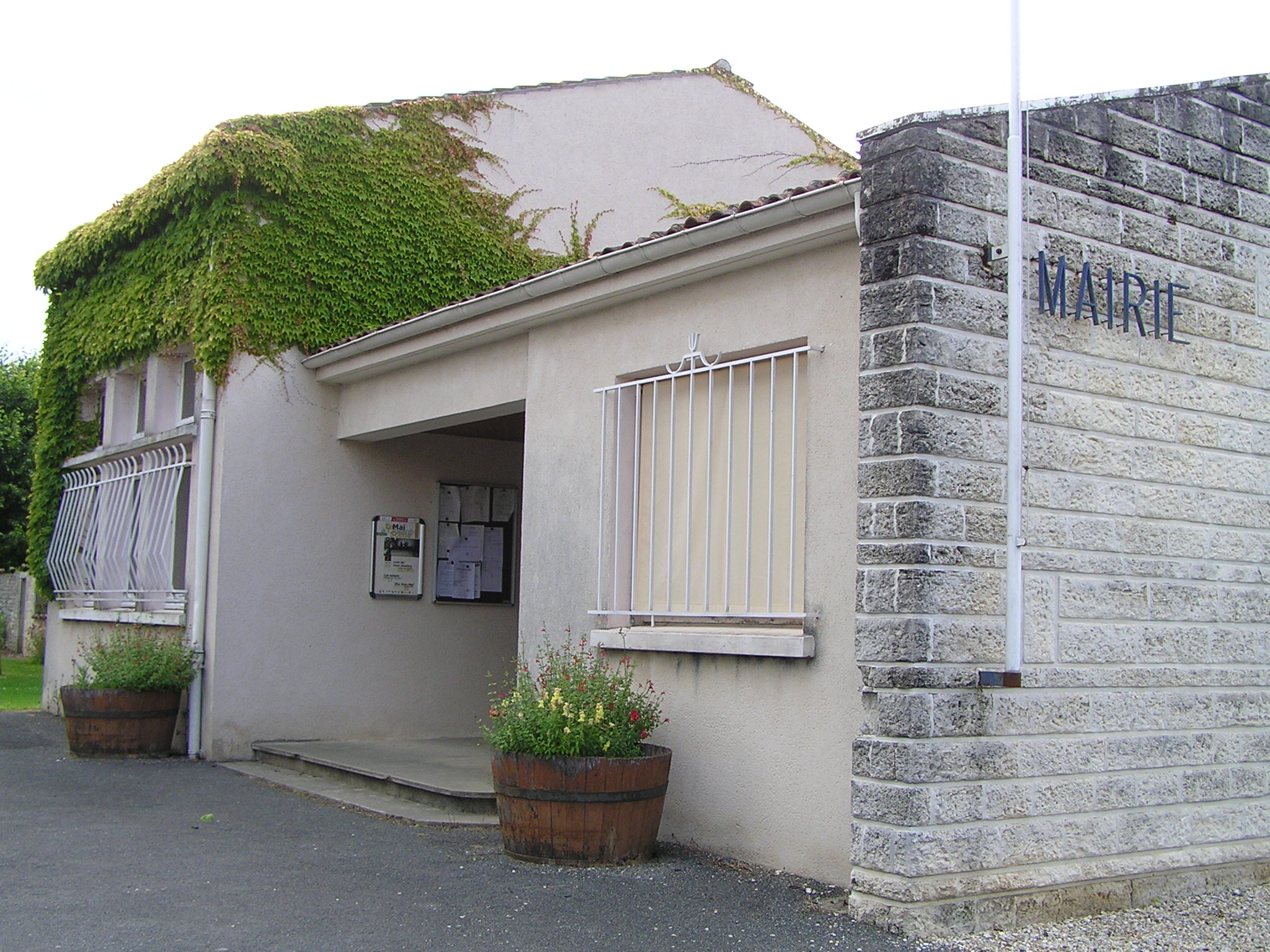
- Town hall
- Location of Louzac-Saint-André
- Location within France Location within Nouvelle-Aquitaine
- Coordinates: 45°42′51″N 0°24′37″W
- Country: France
- Region: Nouvelle-Aquitaine
- Department: Charente
- Arrondissement: Cognac
- Canton: Cognac-1
- Intercommunality: CA Grand Cognac

Government
  - Mayor (2020–2026): Lilian Jousson
- Area^{1}: 10.04 km^{2} (3.88 sq mi)
- Elevation: 74 m (243 ft)
- Highest elevation: 89 m (292 ft)
- Lowest elevation: 20 m (66 ft)
- Population (2023): 946
  - Density: 94.2/km^{2} (244/sq mi)
- Time zone: UTC+01:00 (CET)
  - Summer (DST): UTC+02:00 (CEST)
- INSEE/Postal code: 16193 /16100
- ^{1} French Land Register data, which excludes lakes, ponds, glaciers > 1 km^{2} (0.386 sq mi or 247 acres) and river estuaries.

Louzac-Saint-André (French pronunciation: [luzak sɛ̃.t‿ɑ̃dʁe]) is a commune in the Charente department in southwestern France.

== Population ==
Historical population
Year	Pop.	±% p.a.
1968	607	—
1975	755	+3.17%
1982	747	−0.15%
1990	953	+3.09%
1999	991	+0.44%
2007	996	+0.06%
2012	1,024	+0.56%
2017	995	−0.57%
2023	946	−0.84%
Source: INSEE

== See also ==
- Communes of the Charente department
