= Foussignac =

- Commune
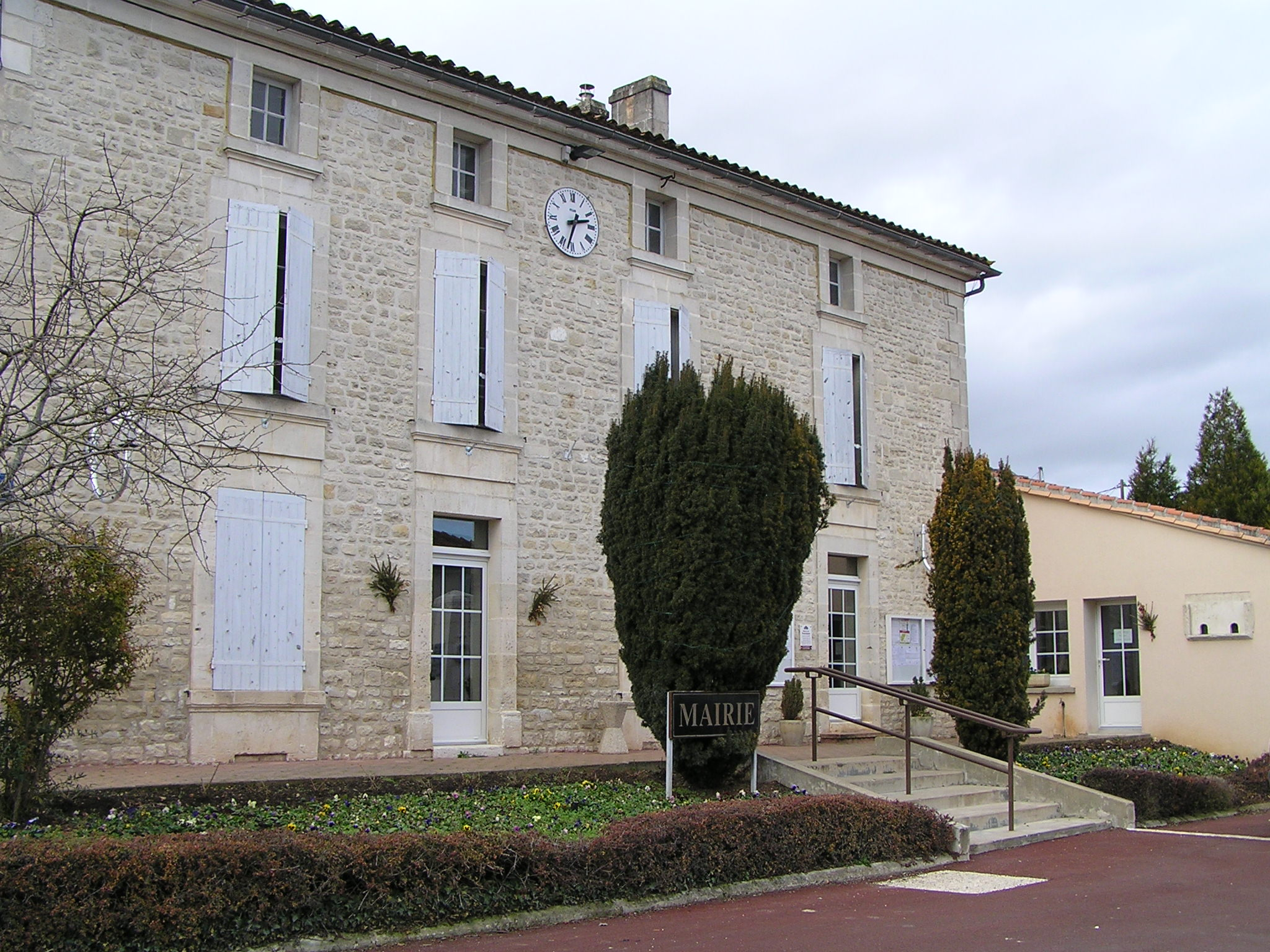
- Town hall

- Coat of arms
- Location of Foussignac
- Location within France Location within Nouvelle-Aquitaine
- Coordinates: 45°42′51″N 0°07′22″W
- Country: France
- Region: Nouvelle-Aquitaine
- Department: Charente
- Arrondissement: Cognac
- Canton: Jarnac
- Intercommunality: CA Grand Cognac

Government
  - Mayor (2020–2026): Georges Henri Devige
- Area^{1}: 15.14 km^{2} (5.85 sq mi)
- Elevation: 68 m (223 ft)
- Highest elevation: 114 m (374 ft)
- Lowest elevation: 24 m (79 ft)
- Population (2023): 661
  - Density: 43.7/km^{2} (113/sq mi)
- Time zone: UTC+01:00 (CET)
  - Summer (DST): UTC+02:00 (CEST)
- INSEE/Postal code: 16145 /16200
- ^{1} French Land Register data, which excludes lakes, ponds, glaciers > 1 km^{2} (0.386 sq mi or 247 acres) and river estuaries.

Foussignac (French pronunciation: [fusiɲak]) is a commune in the Charente department in southwestern France.

== Population ==
Historical population
Year	Pop.	±% p.a.
1968	406	—
1975	488	+2.66%
1982	523	+0.99%
1990	543	+0.47%
1999	551	+0.16%
2007	591	+0.88%
2012	592	+0.03%
2017	635	+1.41%
2023	661	+0.67%
Source: INSEE

== See also ==
- Communes of the Charente department
