= Les Métairies =

- Commune
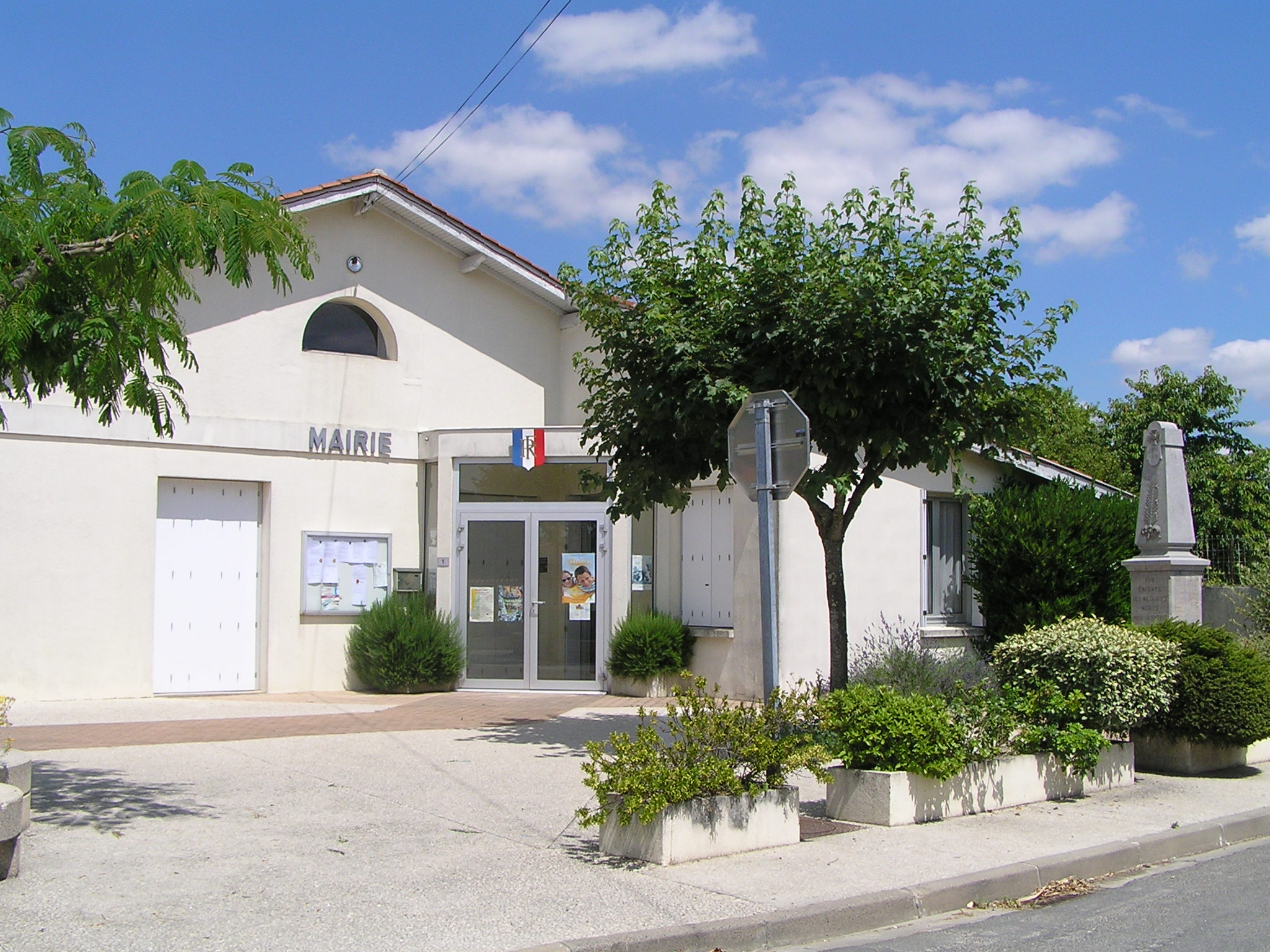
- Town hall
- Location of Les Métairies
- Location within France Location within Nouvelle-Aquitaine
- Coordinates: 45°42′19″N 0°09′52″W
- Country: France
- Region: Nouvelle-Aquitaine
- Department: Charente
- Arrondissement: Cognac
- Canton: Jarnac
- Intercommunality: CA Grand Cognac

Government
  - Mayor (2020–2026): Jean-Luc Marin
- Area^{1}: 5.18 km^{2} (2.00 sq mi)
- Elevation: 25 m (82 ft)
- Highest elevation: 48 m (157 ft)
- Lowest elevation: 17 m (56 ft)
- Population (2023): 707
  - Density: 136/km^{2} (353/sq mi)
- Time zone: UTC+01:00 (CET)
  - Summer (DST): UTC+02:00 (CEST)
- INSEE/Postal code: 16220 /16200
- ^{1} French Land Register data, which excludes lakes, ponds, glaciers > 1 km^{2} (0.386 sq mi or 247 acres) and river estuaries.

Les Métairies (French pronunciation: [le meteʁi]) is a commune in the Charente department in southwestern France.

== Population ==
Historical population
Year	Pop.	±% p.a.
1968	318	—
1975	384	+2.73%
1982	416	+1.15%
1990	533	+3.15%
1999	530	−0.06%
2007	532	+0.05%
2012	640	+3.77%
2017	727	+2.58%
2023	707	−0.46%
Source: INSEE

== See also ==
- Communes of the Charente department
