= Houlette =

- Commune
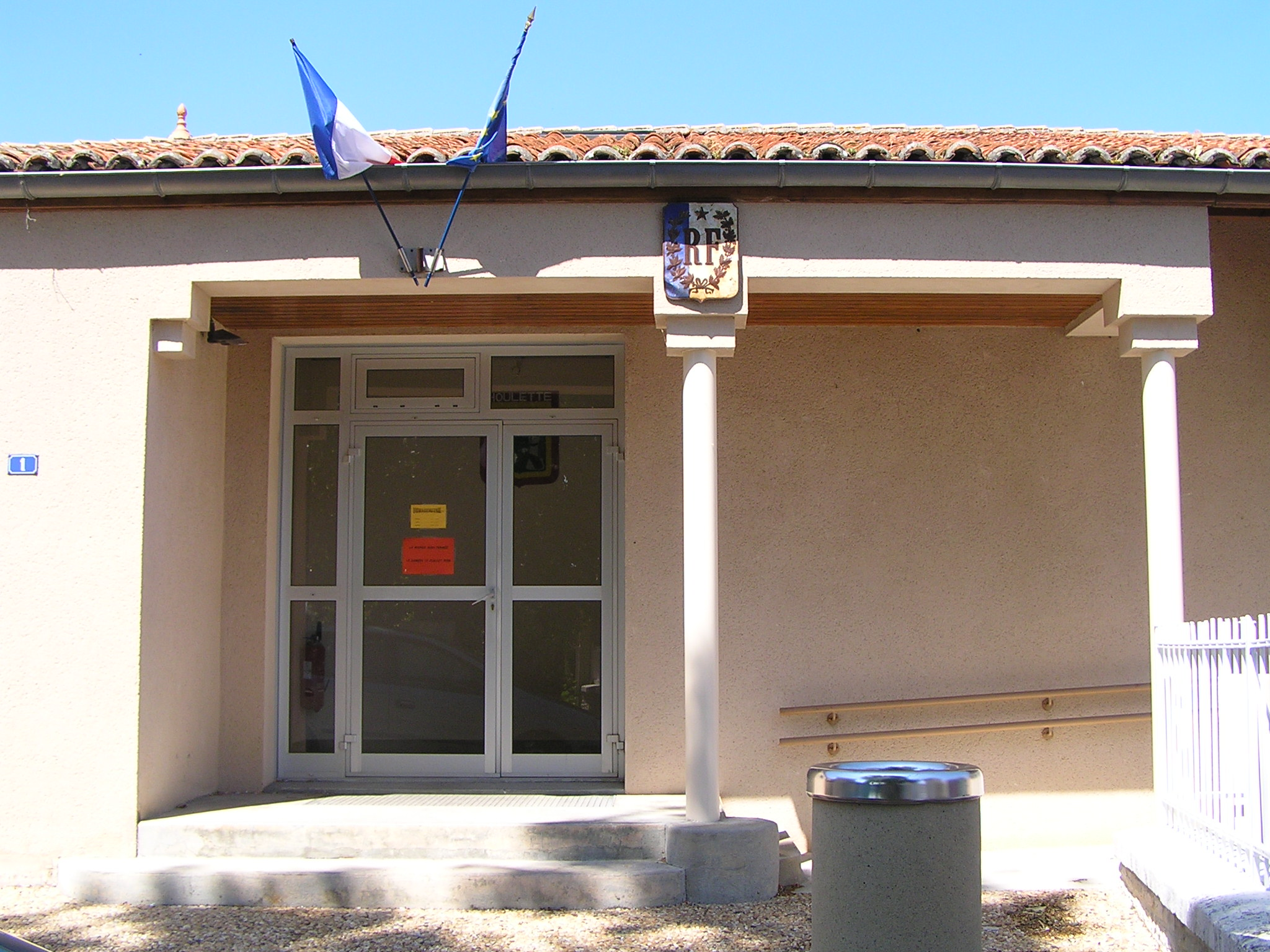
- Town hall

- Coat of arms
- Location of Houlette
- Location within France Location within Nouvelle-Aquitaine
- Coordinates: 45°45′40″N 0°12′40″W
- Country: France
- Region: Nouvelle-Aquitaine
- Department: Charente
- Arrondissement: Cognac
- Canton: Jarnac
- Intercommunality: CA Grand Cognac

Government
  - Mayor (2020–2026): Annick-Franck Martaud
- Area^{1}: 7.15 km^{2} (2.76 sq mi)
- Elevation: 37 m (121 ft)
- Highest elevation: 41 m (135 ft)
- Lowest elevation: 18 m (59 ft)
- Population (2023): 398
  - Density: 55.7/km^{2} (144/sq mi)
- Time zone: UTC+01:00 (CET)
  - Summer (DST): UTC+02:00 (CEST)
- INSEE/Postal code: 16165 /16200
- ^{1} French Land Register data, which excludes lakes, ponds, glaciers > 1 km^{2} (0.386 sq mi or 247 acres) and river estuaries.

Houlette (French pronunciation: [ulɛt]) is a commune in the Charente department in southwestern France.

== Population ==
Historical population
Year	Pop.	±% p.a.
1968	302	—
1975	338	+1.62%
1982	320	−0.78%
1990	373	+1.93%
1999	388	+0.44%
2007	385	−0.10%
2012	387	+0.10%
2017	368	−1.00%
2023	398	+1.31%
Source: INSEE

== See also ==
- Communes of the Charente department
