= Réparsac =

- Commune
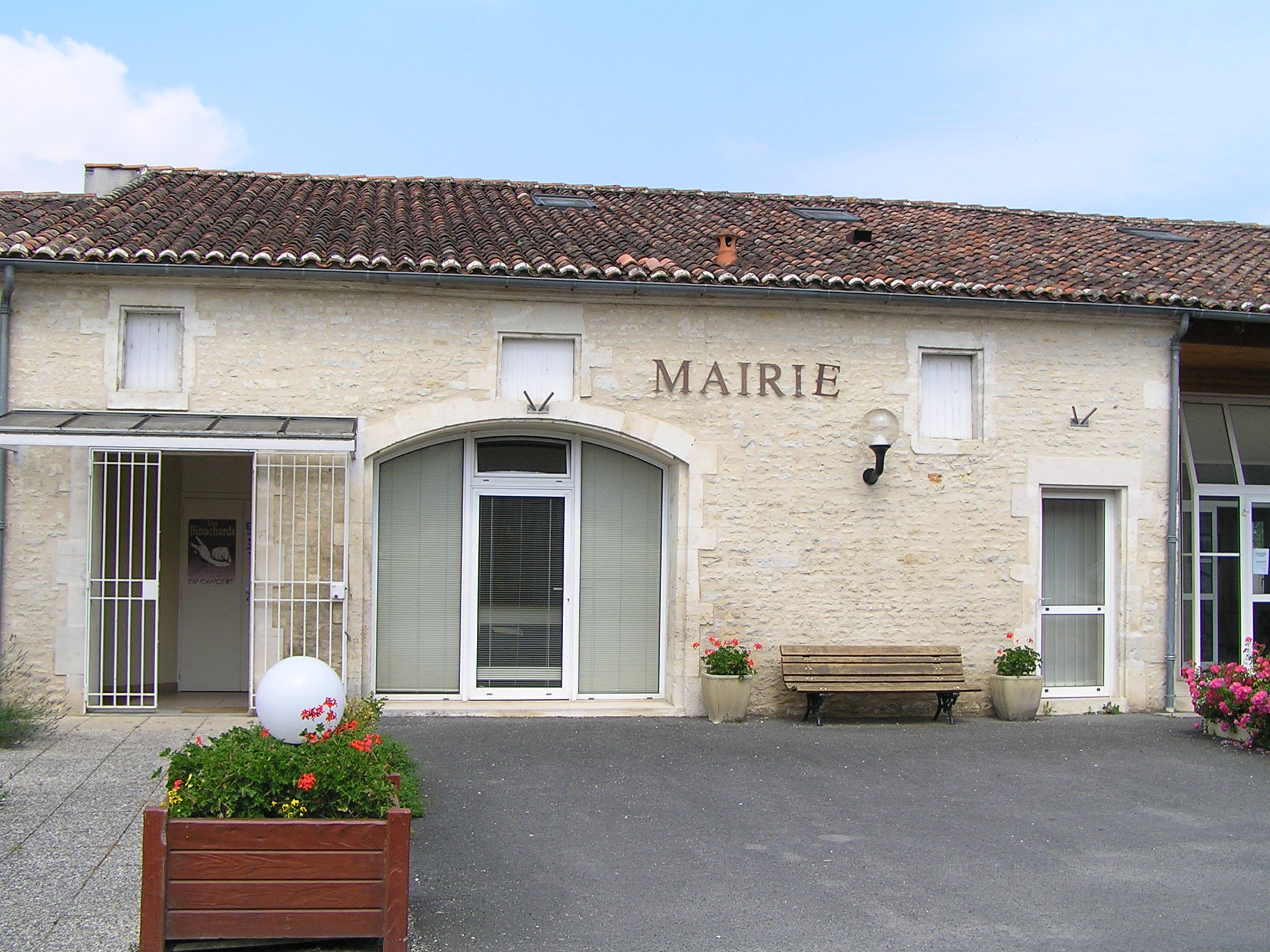
- Town hall
- Location of Réparsac
- Location within France Location within Nouvelle-Aquitaine
- Coordinates: 45°43′52″N 0°14′06″W
- Country: France
- Region: Nouvelle-Aquitaine
- Department: Charente
- Arrondissement: Cognac
- Canton: Jarnac
- Intercommunality: CA Grand Cognac

Government
  - Mayor (2020–2026): Christian Meunier
- Area^{1}: 11.06 km^{2} (4.27 sq mi)
- Elevation: 28 m (92 ft)
- Highest elevation: 38 m (125 ft)
- Lowest elevation: 10 m (33 ft)
- Population (2023): 631
  - Density: 57.1/km^{2} (148/sq mi)
- Time zone: UTC+01:00 (CET)
  - Summer (DST): UTC+02:00 (CEST)
- INSEE/Postal code: 16277 /16200
- ^{1} French Land Register data, which excludes lakes, ponds, glaciers > 1 km^{2} (0.386 sq mi or 247 acres) and river estuaries.

Réparsac (French pronunciation: [ʁepaʁsak]) is a commune in the Charente department in southwestern France.

== Population ==
Historical population
Year	Pop.	±% p.a.
1968	451	—
1975	458	+0.22%
1982	490	+0.97%
1990	531	+1.01%
1999	506	−0.53%
2007	570	+1.50%
2012	636	+2.22%
2017	601	−1.13%
2023	631	+0.82%
Source: INSEE

== See also ==
- Communes of the Charente department
