= Bassac, Charente =

Bassac
- Commune
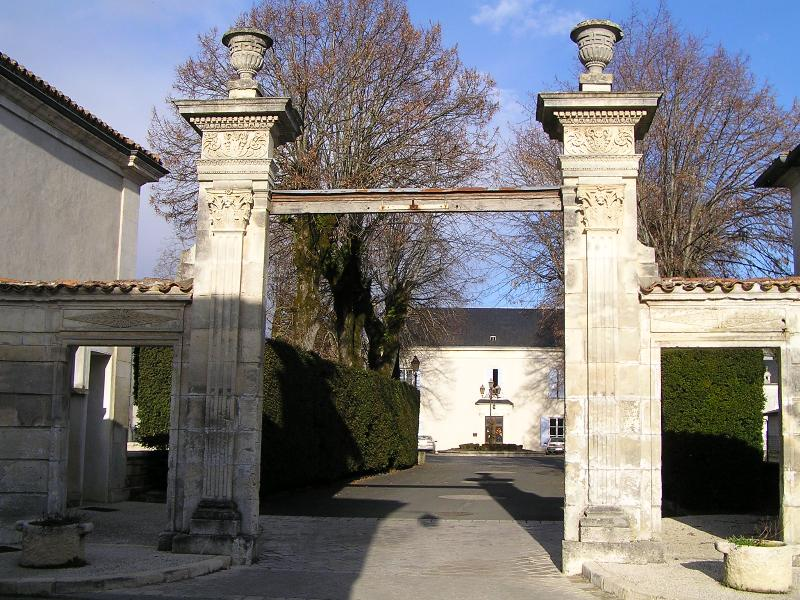
- Town hall

- Coat of arms
- Location of Bassac
- Location within France Location within Nouvelle-Aquitaine
- Coordinates: 45°39′51″N 0°06′20″W
- Country: France
- Region: Nouvelle-Aquitaine
- Department: Charente
- Arrondissement: Cognac
- Canton: Jarnac
- Intercommunality: CA Grand Cognac

Government
  - Mayor (2020–2026): Nicole Roy
- Area^{1}: 7.62 km^{2} (2.94 sq mi)
- Elevation: 20 m (66 ft)
- Highest elevation: 38 m (125 ft)
- Lowest elevation: 12 m (39 ft)
- Population (2023): 529
  - Density: 69.4/km^{2} (180/sq mi)
- Time zone: UTC+01:00 (CET)
  - Summer (DST): UTC+02:00 (CEST)
- INSEE/Postal code: 16032 /16120
- ^{1} French Land Register data, which excludes lakes, ponds, glaciers > 1 km^{2} (0.386 sq mi or 247 acres) and river estuaries.

Bassac (French pronunciation: [basak]) is a commune in the Charente department in southwestern France. It has Bassac Abbey, founded more than 1000 years ago (in the year 1002), partially restored in the late 20th century, and sold in 2015 to a trust ("société civile immobilièree") for renovation.

== Population ==
Historical population
Year	Pop.	±% p.a.
1968	509	—
1975	513	+0.11%
1982	478	−1.00%
1990	464	−0.37%
1999	461	−0.07%
2007	533	+1.83%
2012	550	+0.63%
2017	524	−0.96%
2023	529	+0.16%
Source: INSEE

== See also ==
- Communes of the Charente department
