= Bréville, Charente =

Bréville
- Commune
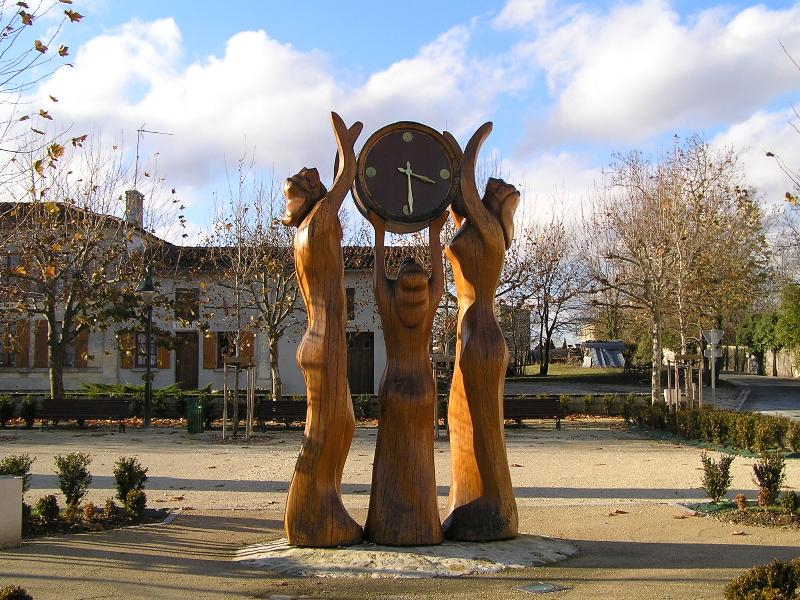
- The sculpture in the main square in Bréville

- Coat of arms
- Location of Bréville
- Location within France Location within Nouvelle-Aquitaine
- Coordinates: 45°47′50″N 0°15′39″W
- Country: France
- Region: Nouvelle-Aquitaine
- Department: Charente
- Arrondissement: Cognac
- Canton: Cognac-1
- Intercommunality: CA Grand Cognac

Government
  - Mayor (2020–2026): Mehdi Kalaï
- Area^{1}: 15.39 km^{2} (5.94 sq mi)
- Highest elevation: 31 m (102 ft)
- Lowest elevation: 15 m (49 ft)
- Population (2023): 436
  - Density: 28.3/km^{2} (73.4/sq mi)
- Time zone: UTC+01:00 (CET)
  - Summer (DST): UTC+02:00 (CEST)
- INSEE/Postal code: 16060 /16370
- ^{1} French Land Register data, which excludes lakes, ponds, glaciers > 1 km^{2} (0.386 sq mi or 247 acres) and river estuaries.

Bréville (French pronunciation: [bʁevil]) is a commune in the Charente department in southwestern France.

== Population ==
Historical population
Year	Pop.	±% p.a.
1968	491	—
1975	434	−1.75%
1982	495	+1.90%
1990	495	+0.00%
1999	512	+0.38%
2007	505	−0.17%
2012	516	+0.43%
2017	466	−2.02%
2023	436	−1.10%
Source: INSEE

== See also ==
- Communes of the Charente department
