= Gondeville =

Commune in Charente, France

- Part of Mainxe-Gondeville
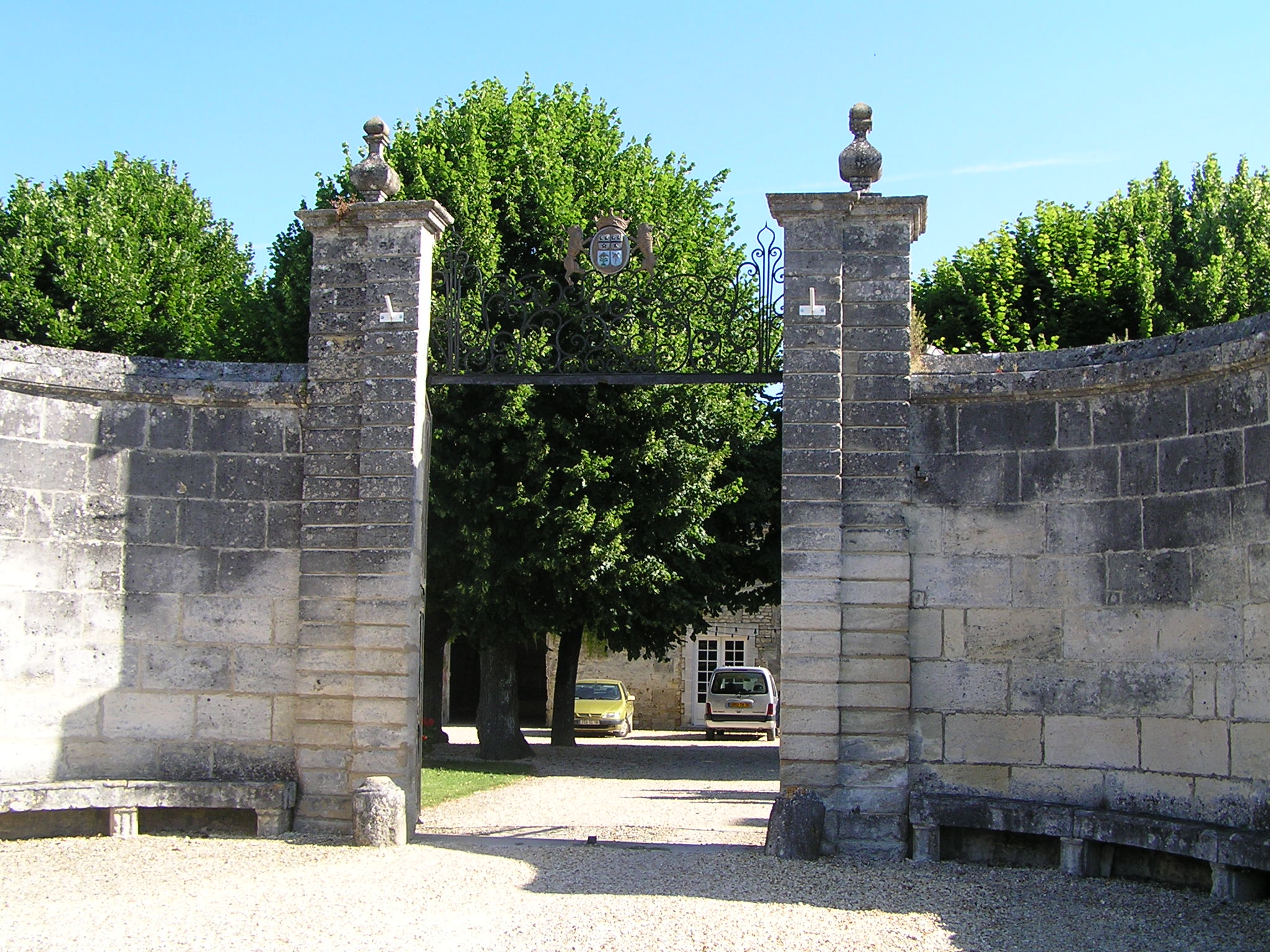
- Gate of the town hall

- Coat of arms
- Location of Gondeville
- Location within France Location within Nouvelle-Aquitaine
- Coordinates: 45°40′19″N 0°08′57″W
- Country: France
- Region: Nouvelle-Aquitaine
- Department: Charente
- Arrondissement: Cognac
- Canton: Jarnac
- Commune: Mainxe-Gondeville
- Area^{1}: 5.46 km^{2} (2.11 sq mi)
- Highest elevation: 40 m (130 ft)
- Lowest elevation: 11 m (36 ft)
- Population (2023): 513
  - Density: 94.0/km^{2} (243/sq mi)
- Time zone: UTC+01:00 (CET)
  - Summer (DST): UTC+02:00 (CEST)
- Postal code: 16200
- ^{1} French Land Register data, which excludes lakes, ponds, glaciers > 1 km^{2} (0.386 sq mi or 247 acres) and river estuaries.

Gondeville (French pronunciation: [ɡɔ̃dvil]) is a former commune in the Charente department in southwestern France. On January 1, 2019, it was merged into the new commune Mainxe-Gondeville.

== See also ==
- Communes of the Charente department
