= Mainxe-Gondeville =

- Commune
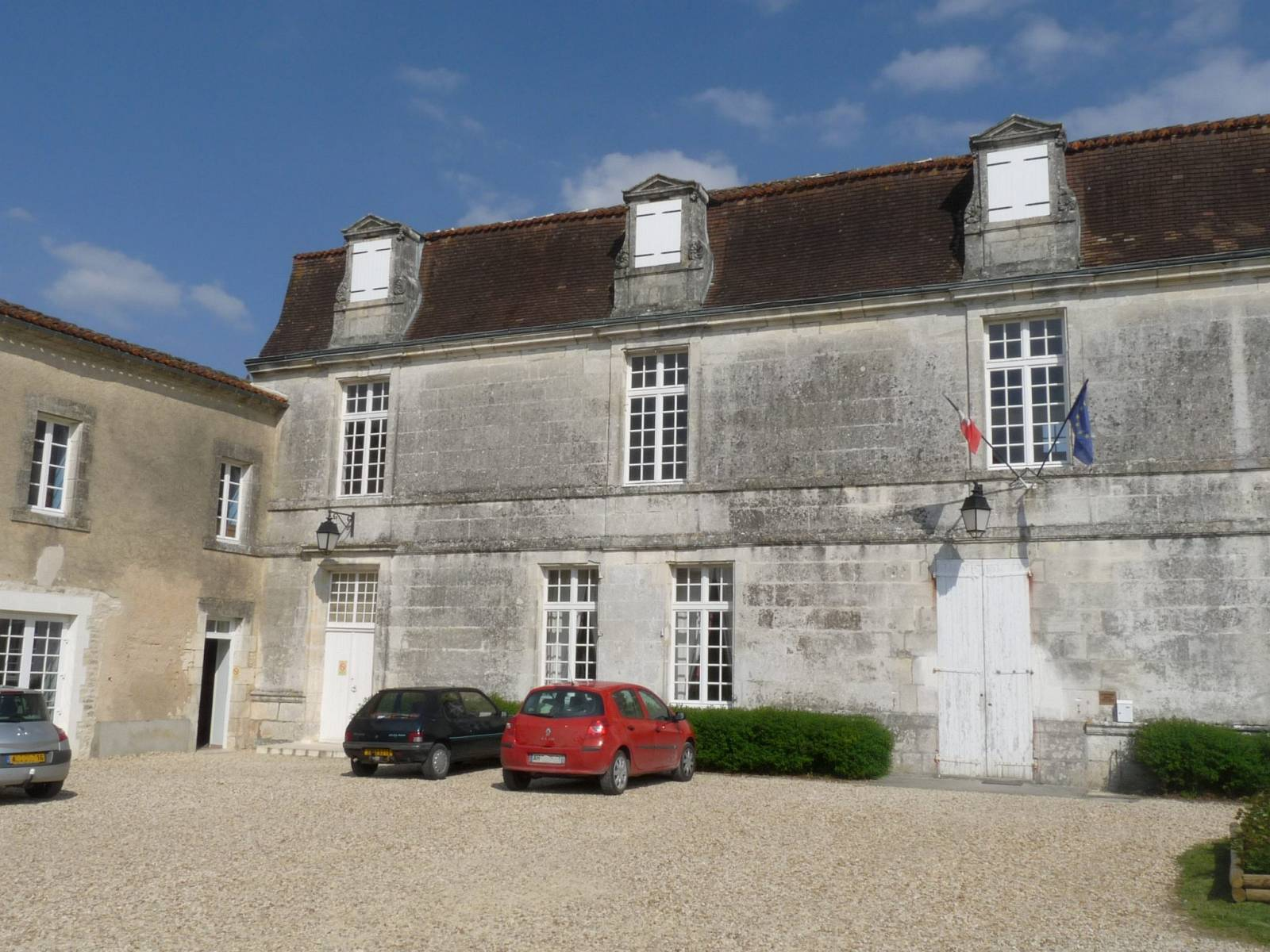
- The town hall in Mainxe-Gondeville
- Location of Mainxe-Gondeville
- Location within France Location within Nouvelle-Aquitaine
- Coordinates: 45°40′19″N 0°08′57″W
- Country: France
- Region: Nouvelle-Aquitaine
- Department: Charente
- Arrondissement: Cognac
- Canton: Jarnac
- Intercommunality: CA Grand Cognac

Government
  - Mayor (2020–2026): Elisabeth Dumont
- Area^{1}: 15.56 km^{2} (6.01 sq mi)
- Population (2023): 1,195
  - Density: 76.80/km^{2} (198.9/sq mi)
- Time zone: UTC+01:00 (CET)
  - Summer (DST): UTC+02:00 (CEST)
- INSEE/Postal code: 16153 /16200
- ^{1} French Land Register data, which excludes lakes, ponds, glaciers > 1 km^{2} (0.386 sq mi or 247 acres) and river estuaries.

Mainxe-Gondeville (French pronunciation: [mɛ̃ks ɡɔ̃dvil]) is a commune in the department of Charente, southwestern France. It was established on 1 January 2019 by merger of the former communes of Gondeville (the seat) and Mainxe.

== See also ==
- Communes of the Charente department
