= Communauté d'agglomération du Grand Cognac =

Grand Cognac
- Communauté d'agglomération
- Interactive map of Grand Cognac
- Coordinates: 45°43′N 00°20′W
- Country: France
- Region: Nouvelle-Aquitaine
- Department: Charente
- No. of communes: {{{nbcomm}}}
- Established: 2017
- Area: 754.3 km^{2} (291.2 sq mi)
- Population (2019): 69,262
  - Density: 91.82/km^{2} (237.8/sq mi)
- Website: www.grand-cognac.fr

Communauté d'agglomération du Grand Cognac is the communauté d'agglomération, an intercommunal structure, centred on the town of Cognac. It is located in the Charente department, in the Nouvelle-Aquitaine region, southwestern France. Created in 2017, its seat is in Cognac. Its area is 754.3 km^{2}. Its population was 69,262 in 2019, of which 18,670 in Cognac proper.

== Composition ==
The communauté d'agglomération consists of the following 55 communes:

1. Angeac-Champagne
2. Angeac-Charente
3. Ars
4. Bassac
5. Bellevigne
6. Birac
7. Bonneuil
8. Bourg-Charente
9. Bouteville
10. Boutiers-Saint-Trojan
11. Bréville
12. Champmillon
13. Chassors
14. Châteaubernard
15. Châteauneuf-sur-Charente
16. Cognac
17. Criteuil-la-Magdeleine
18. Fleurac
19. Foussignac
20. Gensac-la-Pallue
21. Genté
22. Gimeux
23. Graves-Saint-Amant
24. Hiersac
25. Houlette
26. Jarnac
27. Javrezac
28. Juillac-le-Coq
29. Julienne
30. Lignières-Ambleville
31. Louzac-Saint-André
32. Mainxe-Gondeville
33. Mérignac
34. Merpins
35. Mesnac
36. Les Métairies
37. Mosnac-Saint-Simeux
38. Moulidars
39. Nercillac
40. Réparsac
41. Saint-Brice
42. Sainte-Sévère
43. Saint-Fort-sur-le-Né
44. Saint-Laurent-de-Cognac
45. Saint-Même-les-Carrières
46. Saint-Preuil
47. Saint-Simon
48. Salles-d'Angles
49. Segonzac
50. Sigogne
51. Triac-Lautrait
52. Val-de-Cognac
53. Verrières
54. Vibrac
