= Triac-Lautrait =

- Commune
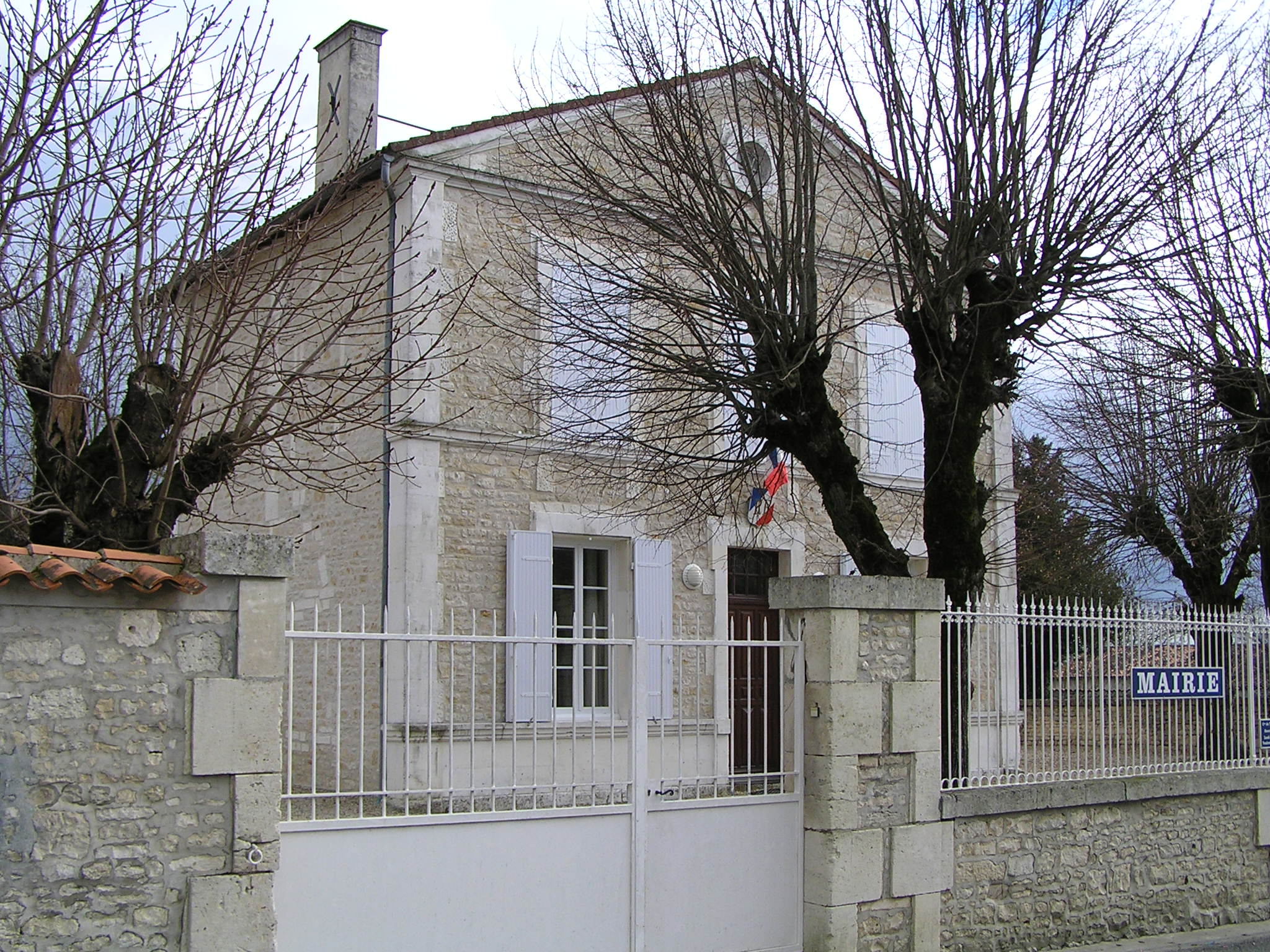
- Town hall

- Coat of arms
- Location of Triac-Lautrait
- Location within France Location within Nouvelle-Aquitaine
- Coordinates: 45°41′26″N 0°07′31″W
- Country: France
- Region: Nouvelle-Aquitaine
- Department: Charente
- Arrondissement: Cognac
- Canton: Jarnac
- Intercommunality: CA Grand Cognac

Government
  - Mayor (2020–2026): Sébastien Bretaud
- Area^{1}: 6.4 km^{2} (2.5 sq mi)
- Elevation: 12 m (39 ft)
- Highest elevation: 49 m (161 ft)
- Lowest elevation: 12 m (39 ft)
- Population (2023): 462
  - Density: 72/km^{2} (190/sq mi)
- Time zone: UTC+01:00 (CET)
  - Summer (DST): UTC+02:00 (CEST)
- INSEE/Postal code: 16387 /16200
- ^{1} French Land Register data, which excludes lakes, ponds, glaciers > 1 km^{2} (0.386 sq mi or 247 acres) and river estuaries.

Triac-Lautrait (French pronunciation: [tʁijak lotʁɛ]) is a commune in the Charente department in southwestern France.

== Population ==
Historical population
Year	Pop.	±% p.a.
1968	344	—
1975	339	−0.21%
1982	342	+0.13%
1990	401	+2.01%
1999	398	−0.08%
2007	444	+1.38%
2012	452	+0.36%
2017	453	+0.04%
2023	462	+0.33%
Source: INSEE

== See also ==
- Communes of the Charente department
