= Val-de-Cognac =

- Commune
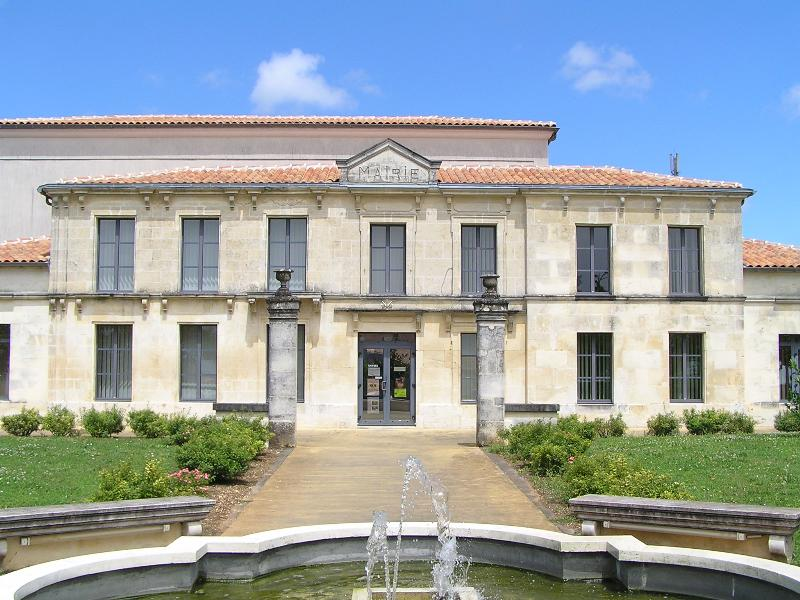
- Town hall in Cherves-Richemont
- Location of Val-de-Cognac
- Location within France Location within Nouvelle-Aquitaine
- Coordinates: 45°44′39″N 0°21′07″W
- Country: France
- Region: Nouvelle-Aquitaine
- Department: Charente
- Arrondissement: Cognac
- Canton: Cognac-1
- Intercommunality: CA Grand Cognac

Government
  - Mayor (2024–2026): Jean-Marc Girardeau
- Area^{1}: 61.76 km^{2} (23.85 sq mi)
- Highest elevation: 104 m (341 ft)
- Lowest elevation: 5 m (16 ft)
- Population (2023): 3,471
  - Density: 56.20/km^{2} (145.6/sq mi)
- Time zone: UTC+01:00 (CET)
  - Summer (DST): UTC+02:00 (CEST)
- INSEE/Postal code: 16097 /16370
- Website: val-de-cognac.com
- ^{1} French Land Register data, which excludes lakes, ponds, glaciers > 1 km^{2} (0.386 sq mi or 247 acres) and river estuaries.

Val-de-Cognac (French pronunciation: [val də kɔɲak], lit. 'Vale of Cognac') is a commune in the Charente department in southwestern France. It was formed on 1 January 2024, with the merger of Cherves-Richemont and Saint-Sulpice-de-Cognac.

== History ==
On 1 January 2024, Cherves-Richemont and Saint-Sulpice-de-Cognac merged to create the new commune of Val-de-Cognac. This merger was validated by the two municipal councils on 26 April 2023 and endorsed by a prefectural decree of 25 September.

== Geography ==
The new commune of Val-de-Cognac is located in the far west of the Charente department, in the small agricultural region of Cognaçais and the micro-country of Borderies. It is located 41.3 km (25.7 mi) from Angoulême, prefecture of the department, and 6.2 km (3.9 mi) from Cognac, the sub-prefecture. The commune is also part of the Cognac living area.

== Population ==
Population data refer to the commune in its geography as of January 2025.

Historical population
Year	Pop.	±% p.a.
1968	3,097	—
1975	3,611	+2.22%
1982	3,784	+0.67%
1990	3,734	−0.17%
1999	3,640	−0.28%
2007	3,689	+0.17%
2012	3,700	+0.06%
2017	3,560	−0.77%
2023	3,471	−0.42%
Source: INSEE

== See also ==
- Communes of the Charente department
