= Bassac Abbey =

Monastery in Charente, France

Bassac Abbey Abbaye Saint-Étienne de Bassac
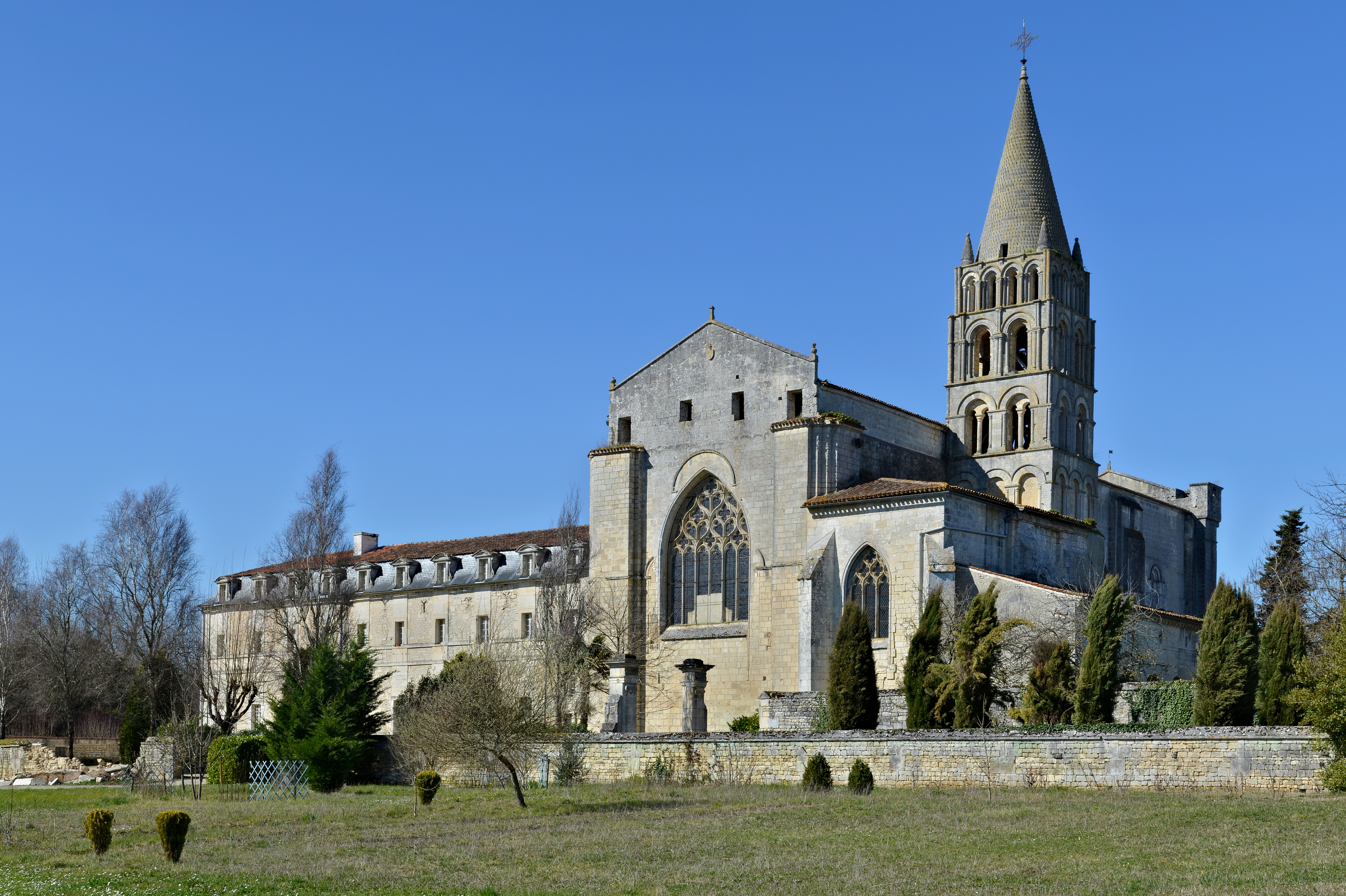
- ESE view of the abbey (12th–18th centuries), Bassac, Charente, France

Religion
- Affiliation: Catholic Church
- Diocese: Charente
- Province: Poitou-Charentes
- Ecclesiastical or organizational status: existing
- Year consecrated: 1002

Location
- Location: Bassac, Charente
- Interactive map of Bassac Abbey; Abbaye Saint-Étienne de Bassac
- Coordinates: 45.661836°N 0.105384°W

Website
- abbayebassac.com

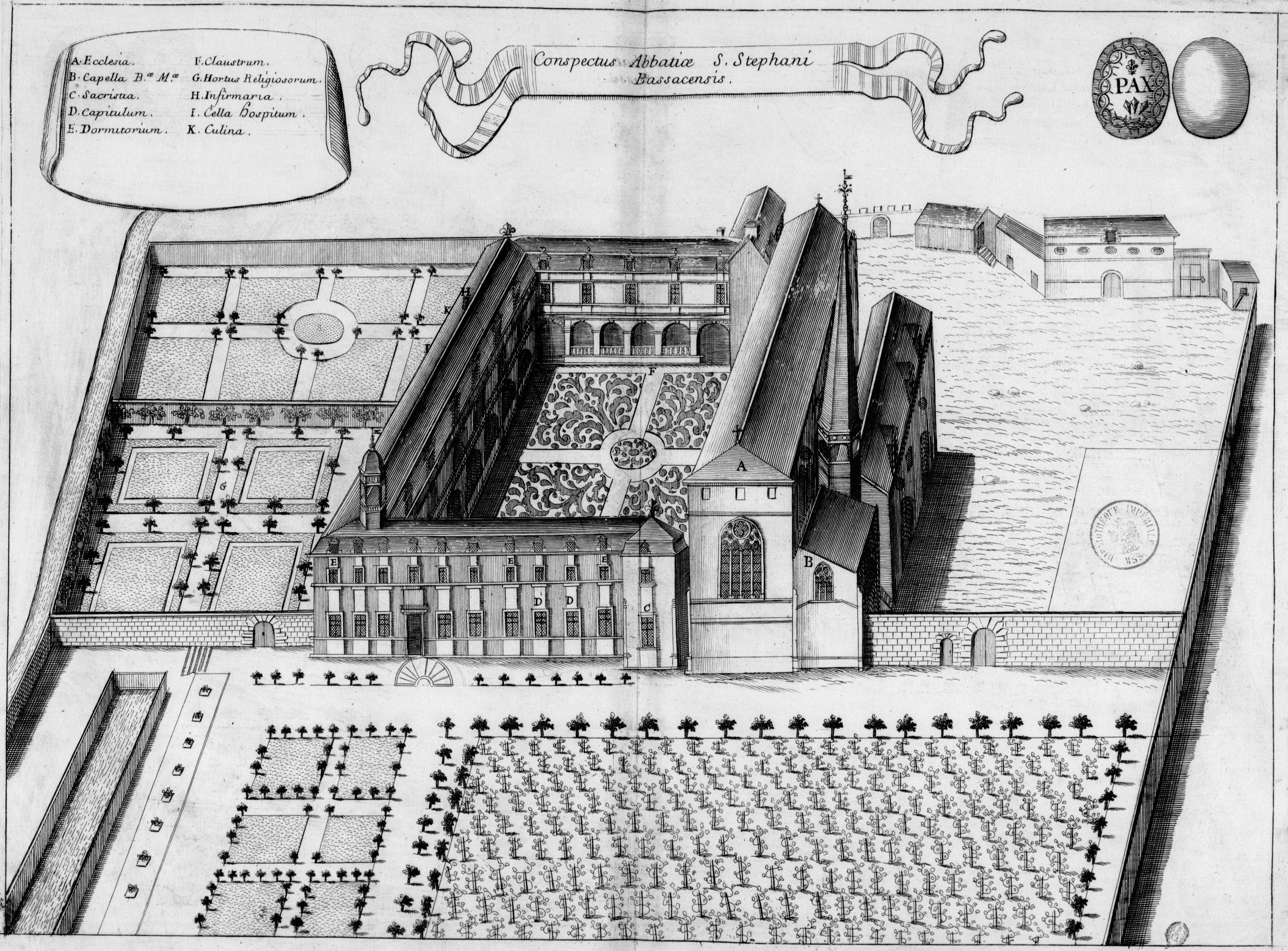
The abbey from the Monasticon Gallicanum (17th century)

Bassac Abbey (French: Abbaye Saint-Étienne de Bassac) is a former Benedictine monastery in Bassac, Charente, France, in the former diocese of Saintes.

The abbey was founded in 1002 by Wardrade Lorichès, count of la Marche and first known Lord of Jarnac, and his wife Rixendis on their return from a pilgrimage to Rome. Both were later buried in the abbey church, which was consecrated in around 1015 by Grimoard, Bishop of Angoulême, and his brother Iso, Bishop of Saintes. In 1095 the abbey was made subordinate to the abbey of Saint-Jean-d'Angély by Pope Urban II but regained its independence in 1246. Bassac Abbey was largely reconstructed under Guillaume de Vibrac, abbot from 1247 to 1286.

It was suppressed in 1791 during the French Revolution. The buildings were sold off as biens nationaux ("state property") except for the church, which became the parish church.

From 1947 to 2012 the surviving buildings were occupied and partly restored by the Congrégation des frères missionnaires de Sainte-Thérèse de l’Enfant Jésus. The site was sold in 2015 to a trust ("société civile immobilièree") for renovation as a "cultural and spiritual space of international dimensions" ("espace culturel et spirituel de dimension internationale").

== See also ==
- Plantagenet style
