= Julienne, Charente =

Julienne
- Commune
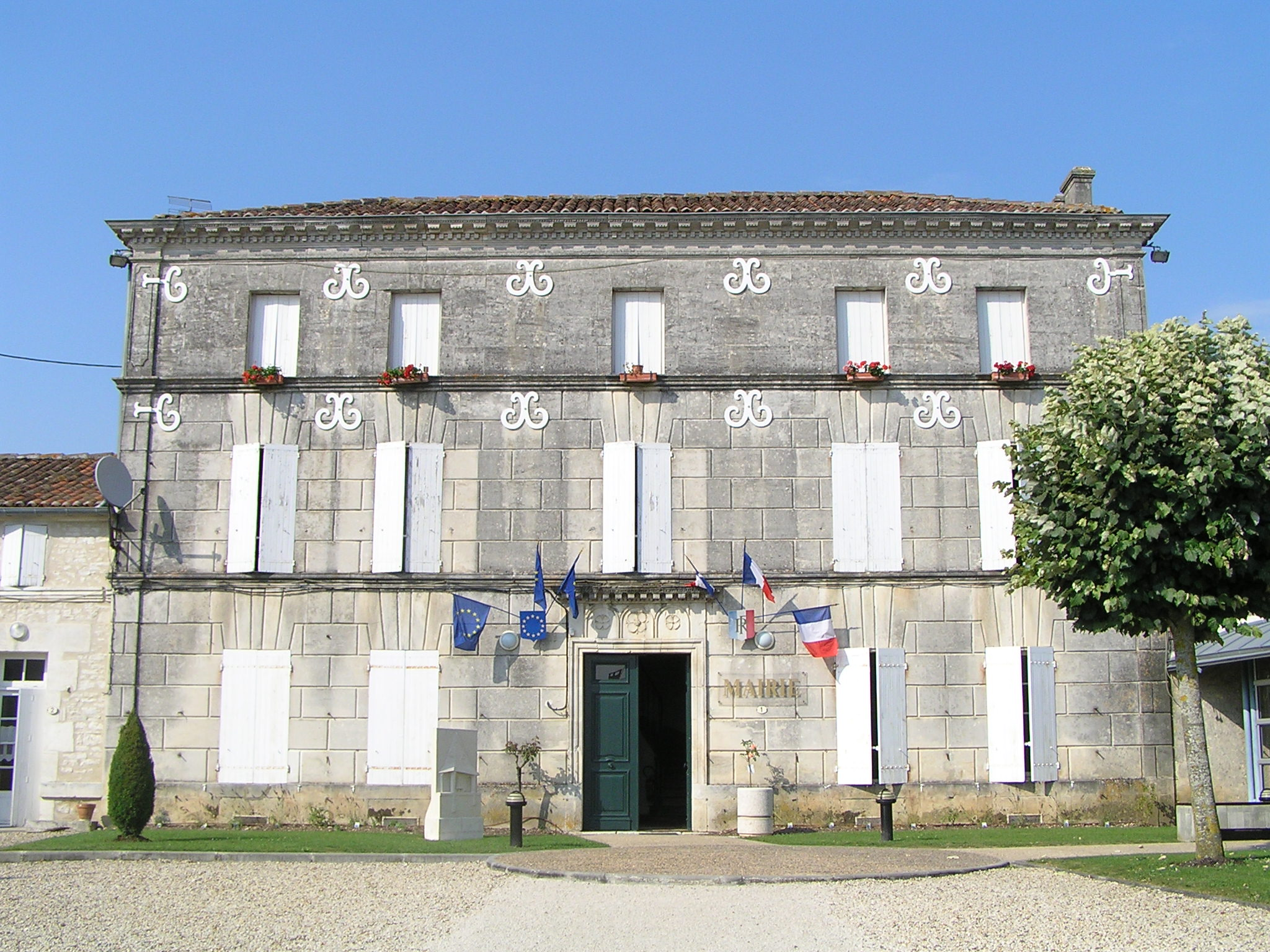
- Town hall

- Coat of arms
- Location of Julienne
- Location within France Location within Nouvelle-Aquitaine
- Coordinates: 45°41′49″N 0°13′46″W
- Country: France
- Region: Nouvelle-Aquitaine
- Department: Charente
- Arrondissement: Cognac
- Canton: Jarnac
- Intercommunality: CA Grand Cognac

Government
  - Mayor (2020–2026): Jean-Marc Lacombe
- Area^{1}: 6.30 km^{2} (2.43 sq mi)
- Elevation: 17 m (56 ft)
- Highest elevation: 51 m (167 ft)
- Lowest elevation: 8 m (26 ft)
- Population (2023): 560
  - Density: 89/km^{2} (230/sq mi)
- Time zone: UTC+01:00 (CET)
  - Summer (DST): UTC+02:00 (CEST)
- INSEE/Postal code: 16174 /16200
- ^{1} French Land Register data, which excludes lakes, ponds, glaciers > 1 km^{2} (0.386 sq mi or 247 acres) and river estuaries.

Julienne (French pronunciation: [ʒyljɛn]) is a commune in the Charente department in southwestern France.

== Population ==
Historical population
Year	Pop.	±% p.a.
1968	280	—
1975	307	+1.32%
1982	296	−0.52%
1990	381	+3.21%
1999	395	+0.40%
2007	432	+1.13%
2012	482	+2.21%
2017	508	+1.06%
2023	560	+1.64%
Source: INSEE

== See also ==
- Communes of the Charente department
