= Sigogne =

- Commune
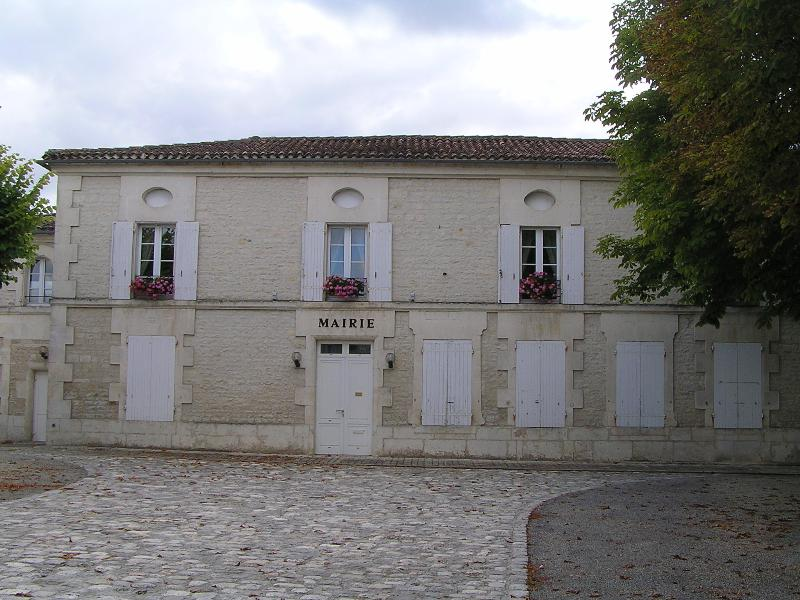
- Town hall

- Coat of arms
- Location of Sigogne
- Location within France Location within Nouvelle-Aquitaine
- Coordinates: 45°44′16″N 0°09′25″W
- Country: France
- Region: Nouvelle-Aquitaine
- Department: Charente
- Arrondissement: Cognac
- Canton: Jarnac
- Intercommunality: CA Grand Cognac

Government
  - Mayor (2020–2026): Jean-Philippe Roy
- Area^{1}: 22.16 km^{2} (8.56 sq mi)
- Elevation: 79 m (259 ft)
- Highest elevation: 91 m (299 ft)
- Lowest elevation: 20 m (66 ft)
- Population (2023): 961
  - Density: 43.4/km^{2} (112/sq mi)
- Time zone: UTC+01:00 (CET)
  - Summer (DST): UTC+02:00 (CEST)
- INSEE/Postal code: 16369 /16200
- ^{1} French Land Register data, which excludes lakes, ponds, glaciers > 1 km^{2} (0.386 sq mi or 247 acres) and river estuaries.

Sigogne (French pronunciation: [siɡɔɲ]) is a commune in the Charente department in southwestern France.

== Population ==
Historical population
Year	Pop.	±% p.a.
1968	950	—
1975	914	−0.55%
1982	883	−0.49%
1990	946	+0.87%
1999	896	−0.60%
2007	1,009	+1.50%
2012	972	−0.74%
2017	992	+0.41%
2023	961	−0.53%
Source: INSEE

== See also ==
- Communes of the Charente department
