= Nercillac =

- Commune
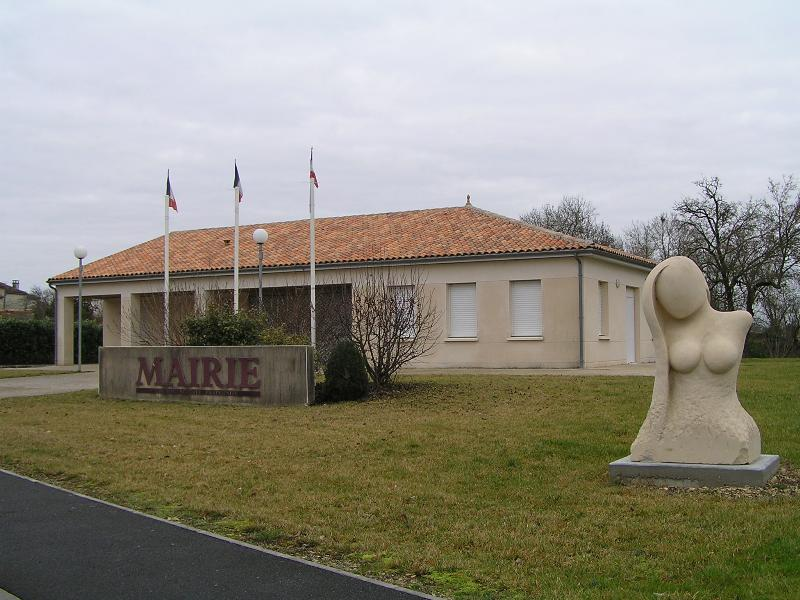
- Town hall

- Coat of arms
- Location of Nercillac
- Location within France Location within Nouvelle-Aquitaine
- Coordinates: 45°42′58″N 0°14′42″W
- Country: France
- Region: Nouvelle-Aquitaine
- Department: Charente
- Arrondissement: Cognac
- Canton: Jarnac
- Intercommunality: CA Grand Cognac

Government
  - Mayor (2020–2026): Bernard Dupont
- Area^{1}: 16.35 km^{2} (6.31 sq mi)
- Elevation: 29 m (95 ft)
- Highest elevation: 34 m (112 ft)
- Lowest elevation: 8 m (26 ft)
- Population (2023): 1,051
  - Density: 64.28/km^{2} (166.5/sq mi)
- Time zone: UTC+01:00 (CET)
  - Summer (DST): UTC+02:00 (CEST)
- INSEE/Postal code: 16243 /16200
- ^{1} French Land Register data, which excludes lakes, ponds, glaciers > 1 km^{2} (0.386 sq mi or 247 acres) and river estuaries.

Nercillac (French pronunciation: [nɛʁsijak]) is a commune in the Charente department in southwestern France.

== History ==
Pot shards and tegulae in Varaize near the edge of Soloire are signs of Gallo-Roman populations. Le Cluniac priory of Notre Dame located in Montour was founded in the eleventh century by the lords of Cognac and redesigned in the fifteenth century. It has been the object of pilgrimages until the Revolution, when it was sold to an individual. It was destroyed in the twentieth century. The lords lived in the home of Tignoux. Count Nercillac emigrated and returned after the restoration.

== Population ==
Historical population
Year	Pop.	±% p.a.
1968	764	—
1975	804	+0.73%
1982	1,047	+3.84%
1990	1,159	+1.28%
1999	1,050	−1.09%
2007	1,019	−0.37%
2012	1,045	+0.51%
2017	1,081	+0.68%
2023	1,051	−0.47%
Source: INSEE

== Gallery ==
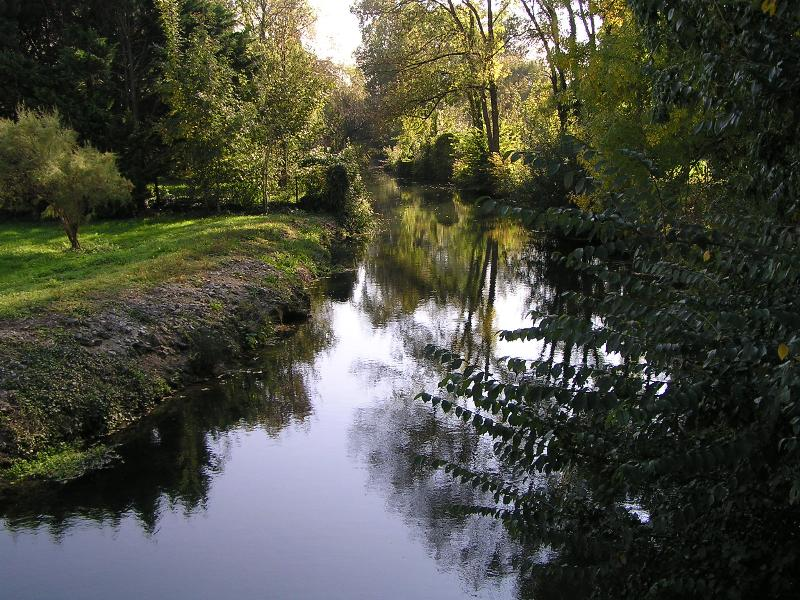
Soloire river

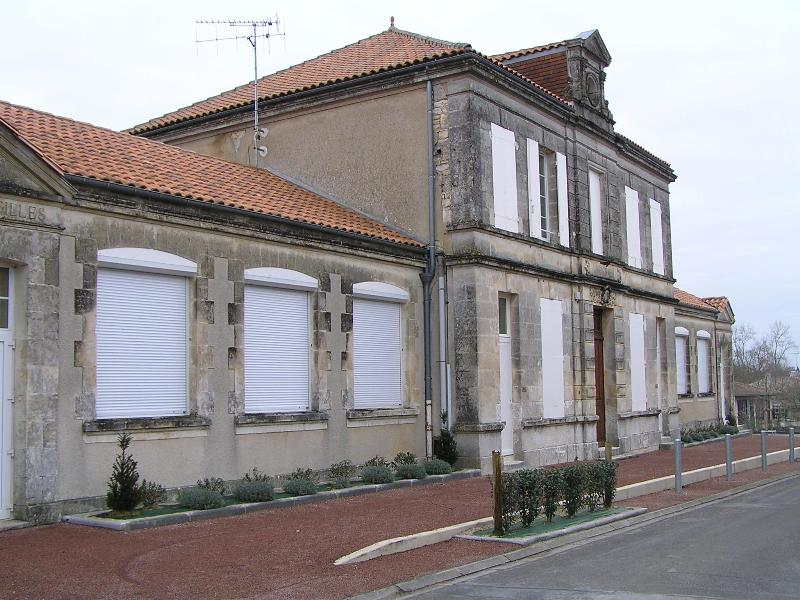
School and town hall

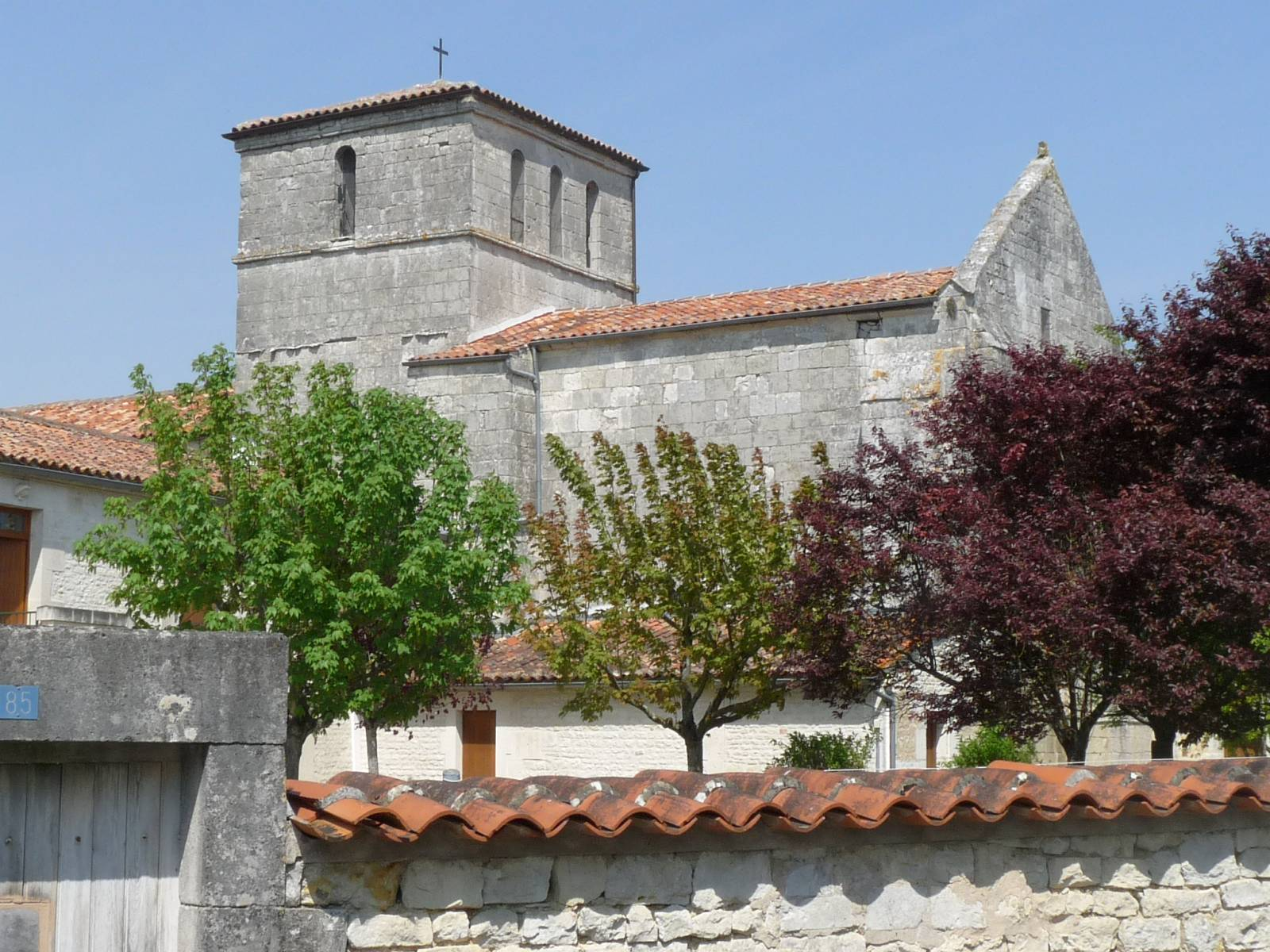
Nercillac church

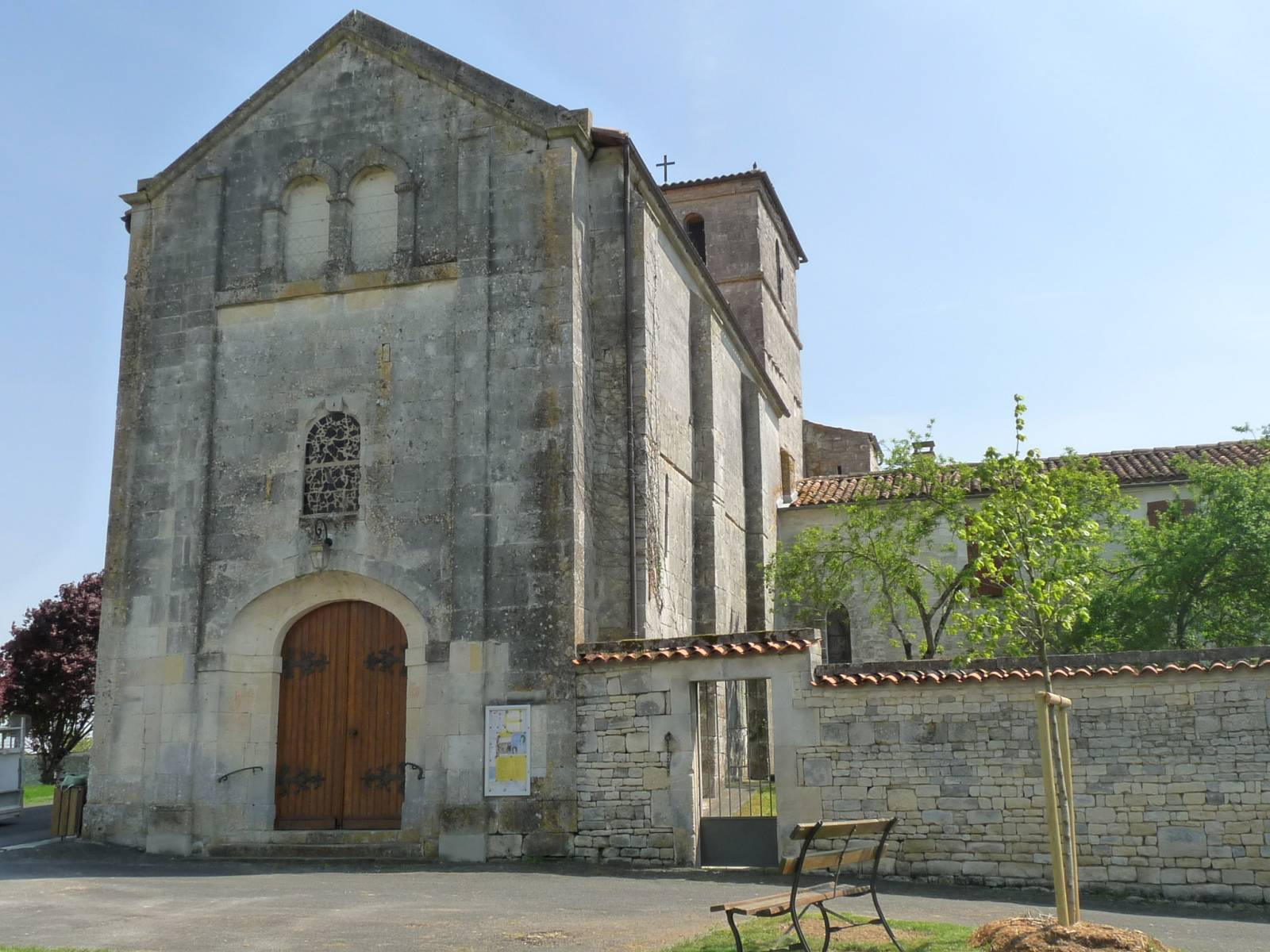

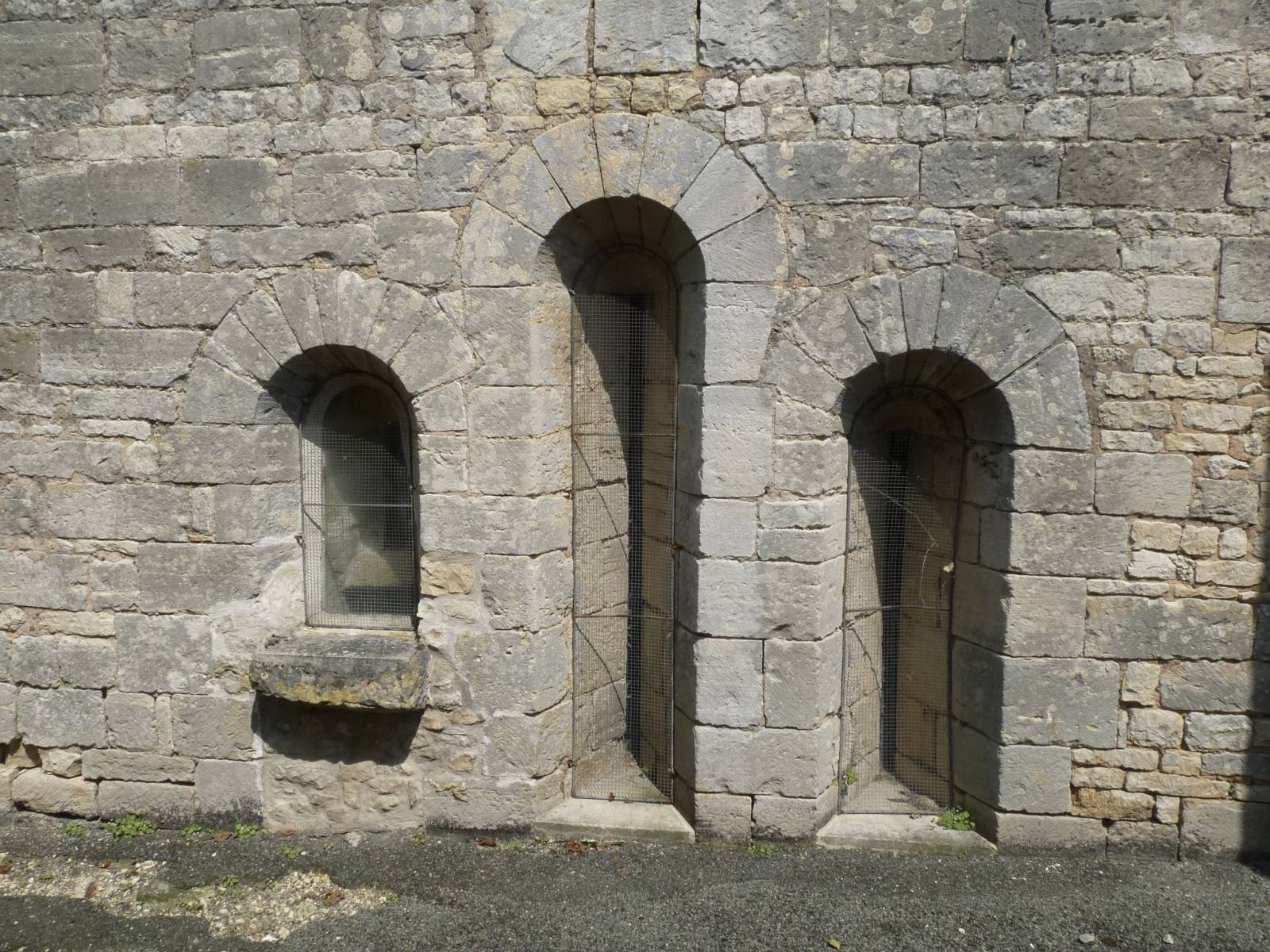
Building behind the church

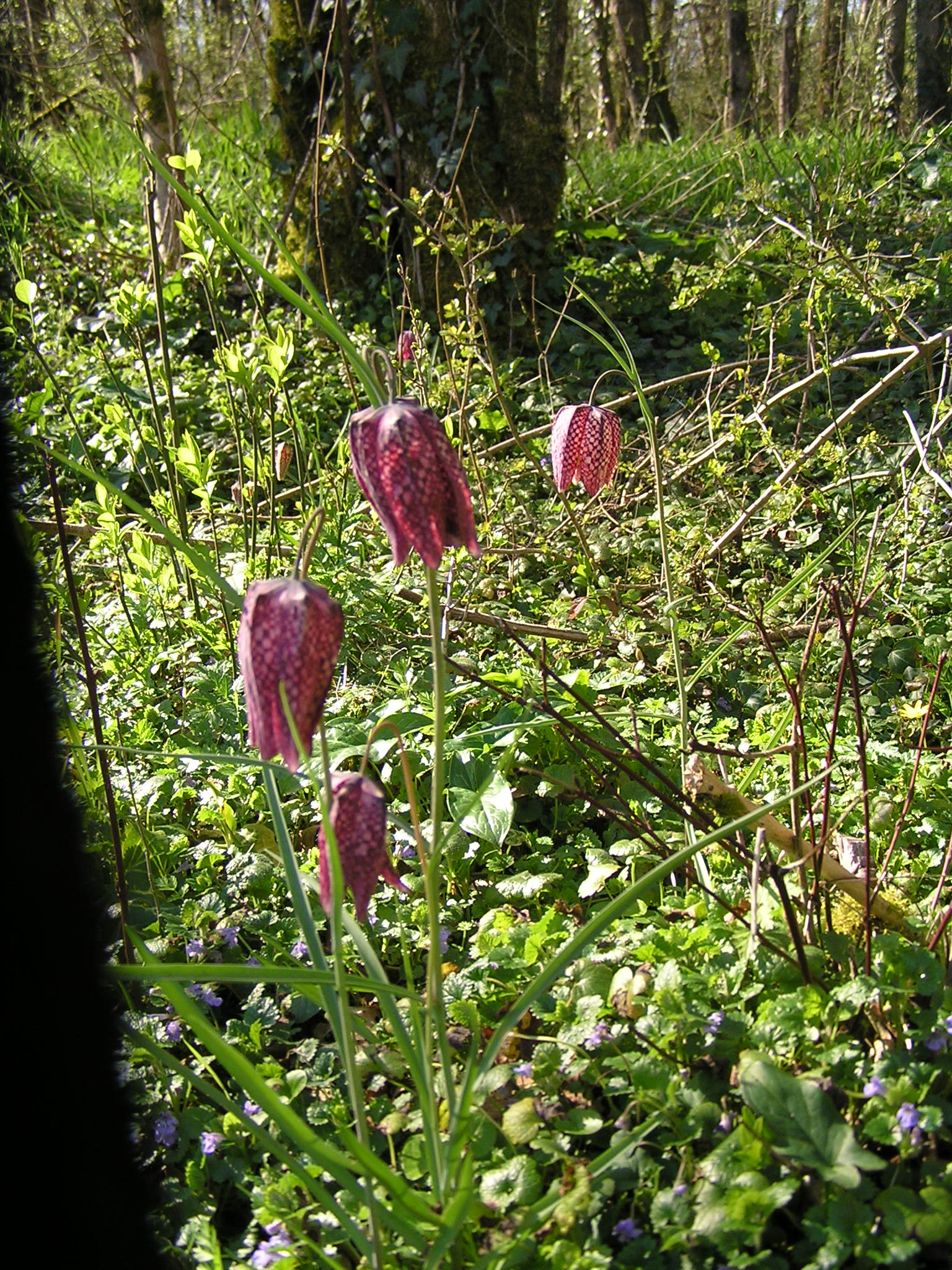
Fritillary guinea

== See also ==
- Communes of the Charente department
