= Boutiers-Saint-Trojan =

- Commune
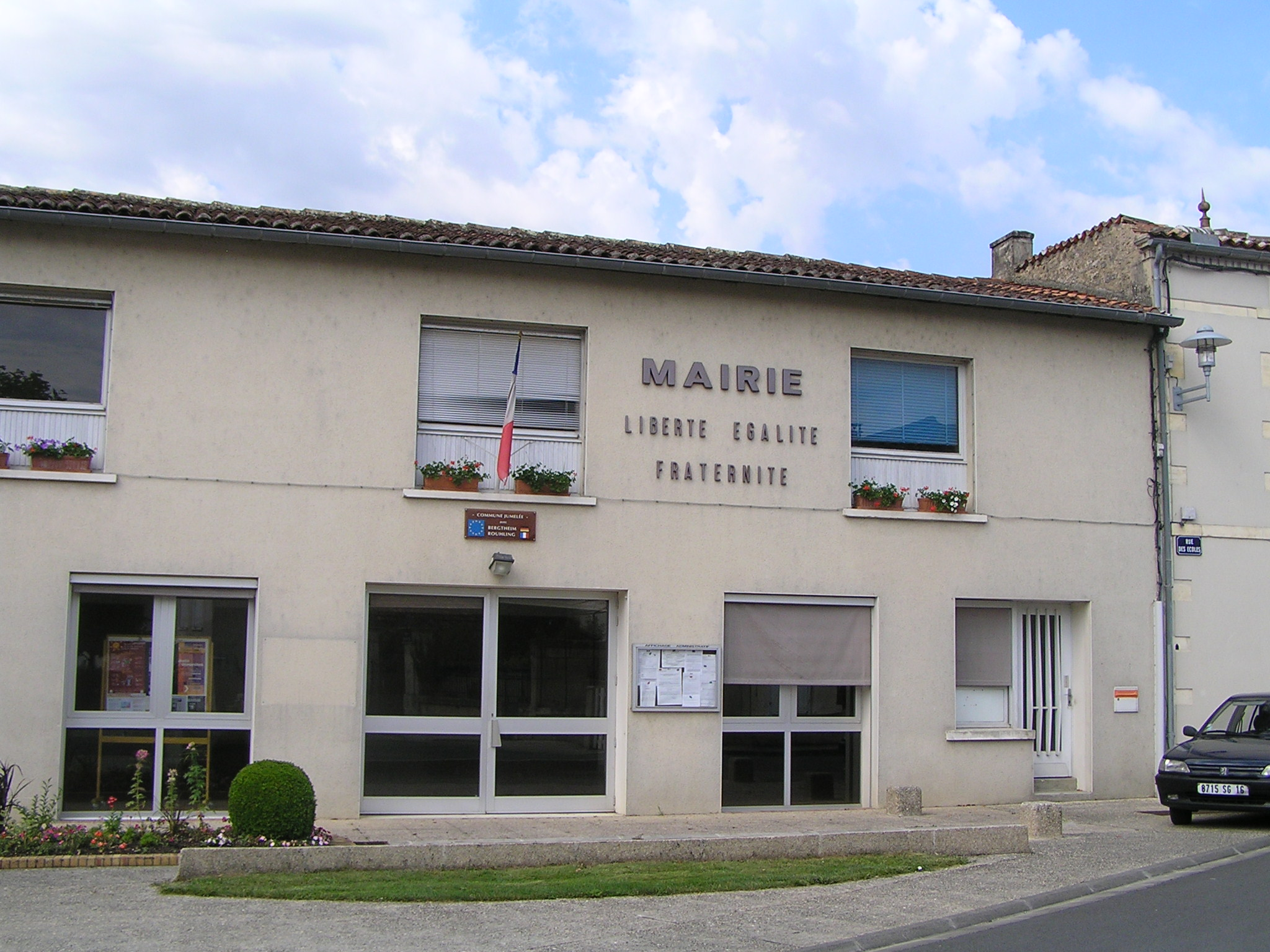
- Town hall
- Location of Boutiers-Saint-Trojan
- Location within France Location within Nouvelle-Aquitaine
- Coordinates: 45°42′49″N 0°17′52″W
- Country: France
- Region: Nouvelle-Aquitaine
- Department: Charente
- Arrondissement: Cognac
- Canton: Cognac-1
- Intercommunality: CA Grand Cognac

Government
  - Mayor (2020–2026): Jean-François Bruchon
- Area^{1}: 7.13 km^{2} (2.75 sq mi)
- Elevation: 46 m (151 ft)
- Highest elevation: 49 m (161 ft)
- Lowest elevation: 5 m (16 ft)
- Population (2023): 1,387
  - Density: 195/km^{2} (504/sq mi)
- Time zone: UTC+01:00 (CET)
  - Summer (DST): UTC+02:00 (CEST)
- INSEE/Postal code: 16058 /16100
- ^{1} French Land Register data, which excludes lakes, ponds, glaciers > 1 km^{2} (0.386 sq mi or 247 acres) and river estuaries.

Boutiers-Saint-Trojan (French pronunciation: [butje sɛ̃ tʁɔʒɑ̃]) is a commune in the Charente department, southwestern France.

== Population ==
Historical population
Year	Pop.	±% p.a.
1968	1,011	—
1975	1,288	+3.52%
1982	1,313	+0.28%
1990	1,478	+1.49%
1999	1,379	−0.77%
2007	1,319	−0.55%
2012	1,452	+1.94%
2017	1,430	−0.30%
2023	1,387	−0.51%
Source: INSEE

== See also ==
- Communes of the Charente department
