= Sainte-Sévère =

- Commune
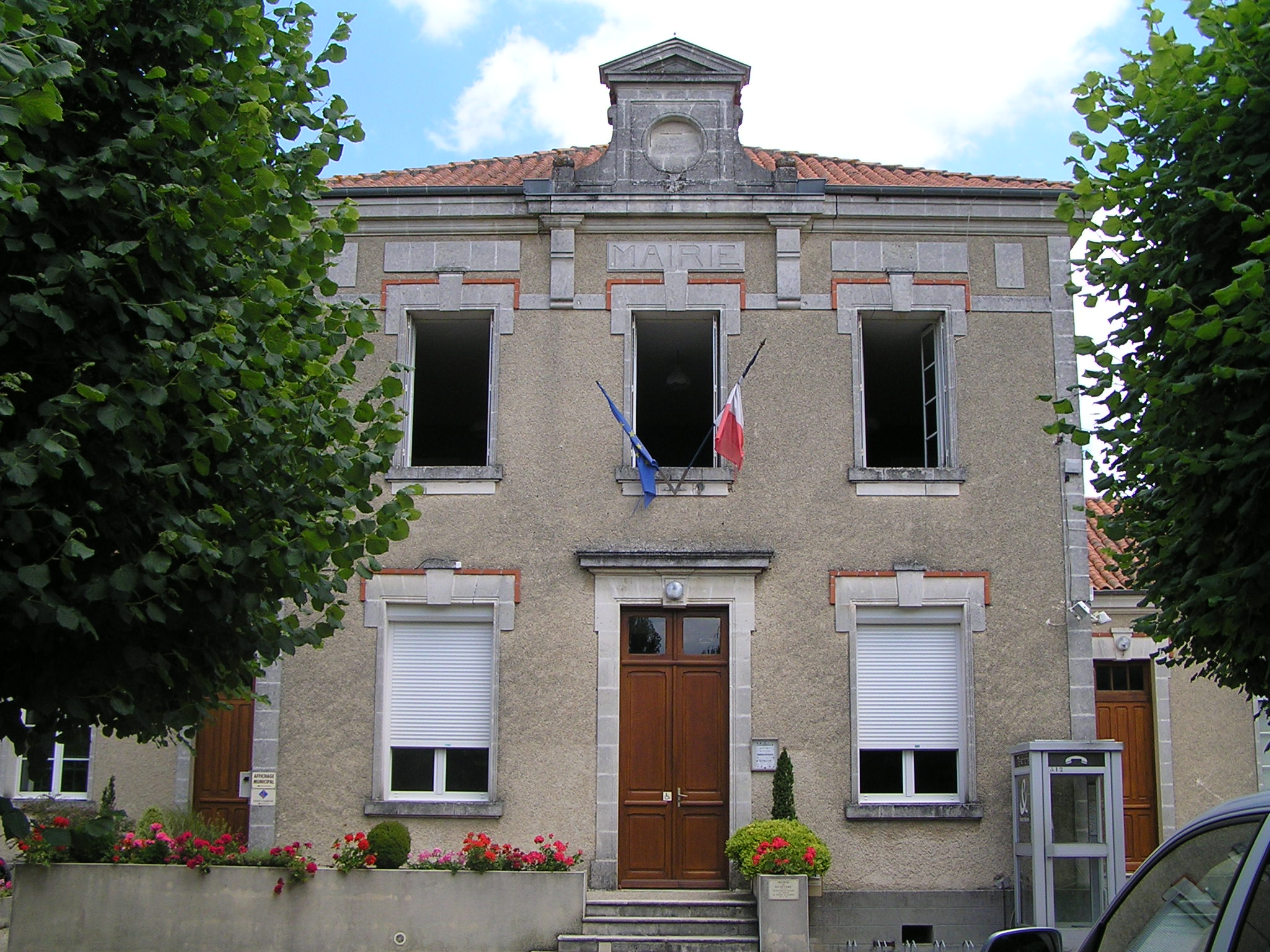
- Town hall
- Location of Sainte-Sévère
- Location within France Location within Nouvelle-Aquitaine
- Coordinates: 45°45′13″N 0°14′14″W
- Country: France
- Region: Nouvelle-Aquitaine
- Department: Charente
- Arrondissement: Cognac
- Canton: Jarnac
- Intercommunality: CA Grand Cognac

Government
  - Mayor (2020–2026): Séverine Caillé
- Area^{1}: 18.31 km^{2} (7.07 sq mi)
- Highest elevation: 31 m (102 ft)
- Lowest elevation: 11 m (36 ft)
- Population (2023): 519
  - Density: 28.3/km^{2} (73.4/sq mi)
- Time zone: UTC+01:00 (CET)
  - Summer (DST): UTC+02:00 (CEST)
- INSEE/Postal code: 16349 /16200
- ^{1} French Land Register data, which excludes lakes, ponds, glaciers > 1 km^{2} (0.386 sq mi or 247 acres) and river estuaries.

Sainte-Sévère (French pronunciation: [sɛ̃t sevɛʁ]) is a commune in the Charente department in southwestern France.

== Population ==
Historical population
Year	Pop.	±% p.a.
1968	474	—
1975	499	+0.74%
1982	509	+0.28%
1990	578	+1.60%
1999	550	−0.55%
2007	541	−0.21%
2012	546	+0.18%
2017	524	−0.82%
2023	519	−0.16%
Source: INSEE

== See also ==
- Communes of the Charente department
