= Mérignac, Charente =

Mérignac
- Commune
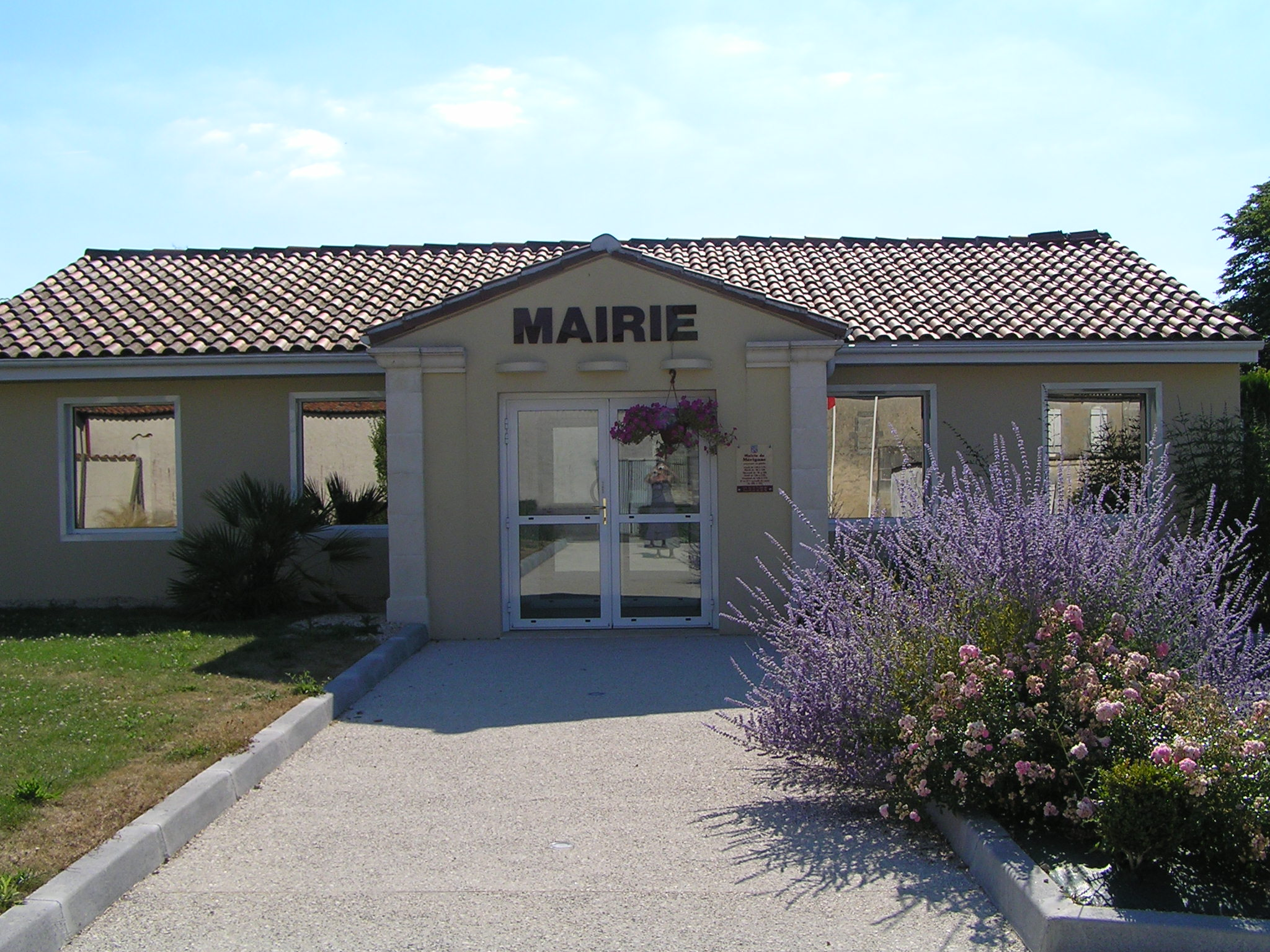
- Town hall

- Coat of arms
- Location of Mérignac
- Location within France Location within Nouvelle-Aquitaine
- Coordinates: 45°41′59″N 0°04′45″W
- Country: France
- Region: Nouvelle-Aquitaine
- Department: Charente
- Arrondissement: Cognac
- Canton: Jarnac
- Intercommunality: CA Grand Cognac

Government
  - Mayor (2020–2026): Jean-Christophe Cor
- Area^{1}: 18.51 km^{2} (7.15 sq mi)
- Elevation: 40 m (130 ft)
- Highest elevation: 101 m (331 ft)
- Lowest elevation: 23 m (75 ft)
- Population (2023): 805
  - Density: 43.5/km^{2} (113/sq mi)
- Time zone: UTC+01:00 (CET)
  - Summer (DST): UTC+02:00 (CEST)
- INSEE/Postal code: 16216 /16200
- ^{1} French Land Register data, which excludes lakes, ponds, glaciers > 1 km^{2} (0.386 sq mi or 247 acres) and river estuaries.

Mérignac (French pronunciation: [meʁiɲak]) is a commune in the Charente department in southwestern France.

== Population ==
Historical population
Year	Pop.	±% p.a.
1968	747	—
1975	806	+1.09%
1982	728	−1.44%
1990	751	+0.39%
1999	717	−0.51%
2007	702	−0.26%
2012	743	+1.14%
2017	839	+2.46%
2023	805	−0.69%
Source: INSEE

== See also ==
- Communes of the Charente department
