= Fleurac, Charente =

Fleurac
- Commune
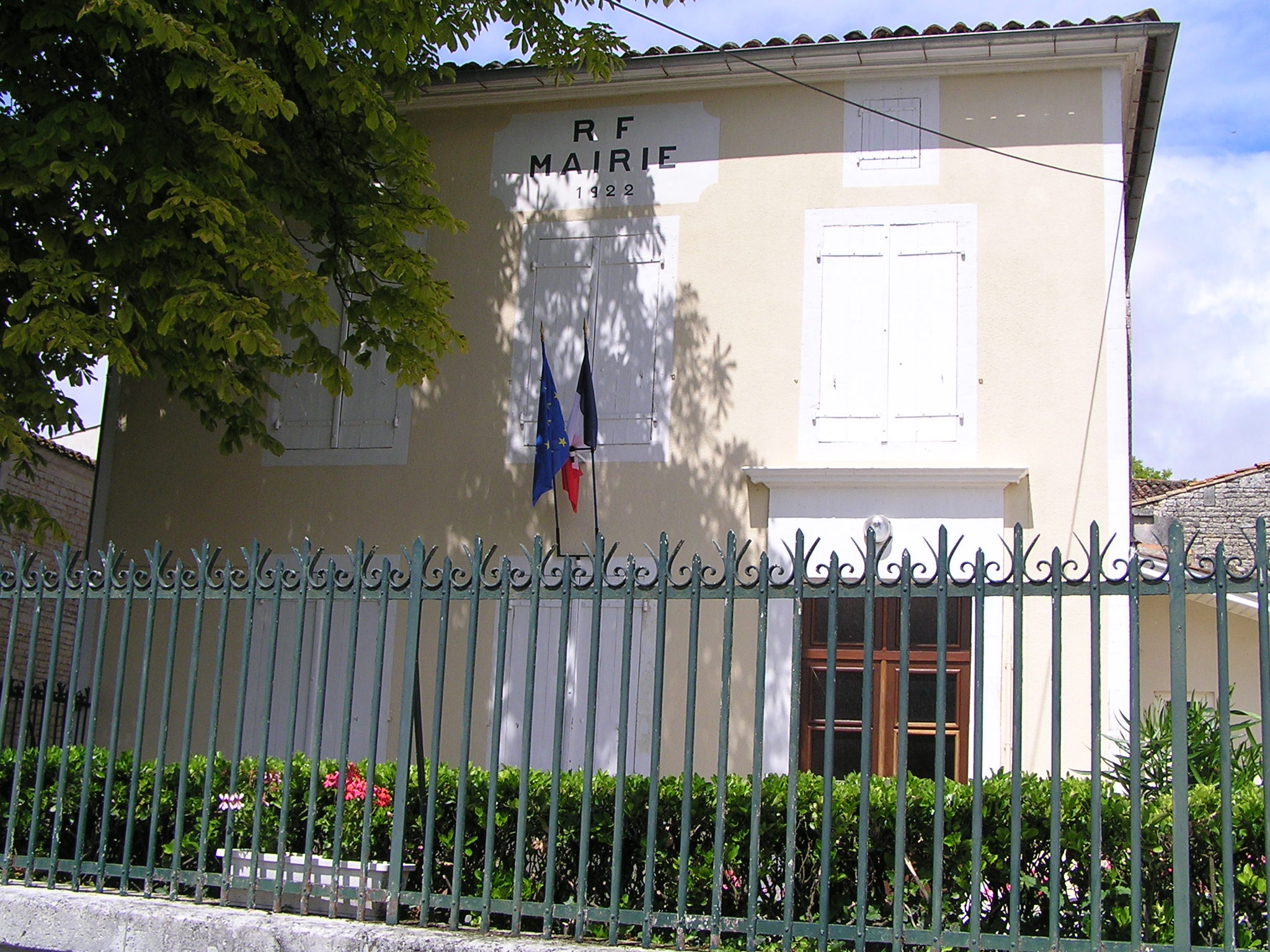
- Town hall
- Location of Fleurac
- Location within France Location within Nouvelle-Aquitaine
- Coordinates: 45°43′18″N 0°04′56″W
- Country: France
- Region: Nouvelle-Aquitaine
- Department: Charente
- Arrondissement: Cognac
- Canton: Jarnac
- Intercommunality: CA Grand Cognac

Government
  - Mayor (2020–2026): Michel Ecalle
- Area^{1}: 2.17 km^{2} (0.84 sq mi)
- Elevation: 64 m (210 ft)
- Highest elevation: 92 m (302 ft)
- Lowest elevation: 49 m (161 ft)
- Population (2023): 201
  - Density: 92.6/km^{2} (240/sq mi)
- Time zone: UTC+01:00 (CET)
  - Summer (DST): UTC+02:00 (CEST)
- INSEE/Postal code: 16139 /16200
- ^{1} French Land Register data, which excludes lakes, ponds, glaciers > 1 km^{2} (0.386 sq mi or 247 acres) and river estuaries.

Fleurac (French pronunciation: [flœʁak]) is a commune in the Charente department in southwestern France.

== Population ==
Historical population
Year	Pop.	±% p.a.
1968	251	—
1975	257	+0.34%
1982	238	−1.09%
1990	244	+0.31%
1999	232	−0.56%
2007	229	−0.16%
2012	244	+1.28%
2017	242	−0.16%
2023	201	−3.05%
Source: INSEE

== See also ==
- Communes of the Charente department
