= Canton of Jarnac =

Coordinates: 45.68°N 0.17°W

- Canton
- Situation of the canton of Jarnac in the department of Charente
- Country: France
- Region: Nouvelle-Aquitaine
- Department: Charente
- No. of communes: {{{nbcomm}}}
- Population (2023): 16,199
- INSEE code: 1615

The canton of Jarnac is an administrative division of the Charente department, southwestern France. Its borders were modified at the French canton reorganisation which came into effect in March 2015. Its seat is in Jarnac.

It consists of the following communes:

1. Bassac
2. Bourg-Charente
3. Chassors
4. Fleurac
5. Foussignac
6. Houlette
7. Jarnac
8. Julienne
9. Mainxe-Gondeville
10. Mérignac
11. Les Métairies
12. Nercillac
13. Réparsac
14. Sainte-Sévère
15. Saint-Même-les-Carrières
16. Sigogne
17. Triac-Lautrait
