= Canton of Cognac-1 =

Coordinates: 45.70°N 0.33°W

- Canton
- Situation of the canton of Cognac-1 in the department of Charente
- Country: France
- Region: Nouvelle-Aquitaine
- Department: Charente
- No. of communes: {{{nbcomm}}}
- Population (2023): 16,334
- INSEE code: 1611

The canton of Cognac-1 is an administrative division of the Charente department, southwestern France. It was created at the French canton reorganisation which came into effect in March 2015. Its seat is in Cognac.

It consists of the following communes:

1. Boutiers-Saint-Trojan
2. Bréville
3. Cognac (partly)
4. Louzac-Saint-André
5. Mesnac
6. Saint-Brice
7. Val-de-Cognac
