= Né (river) =

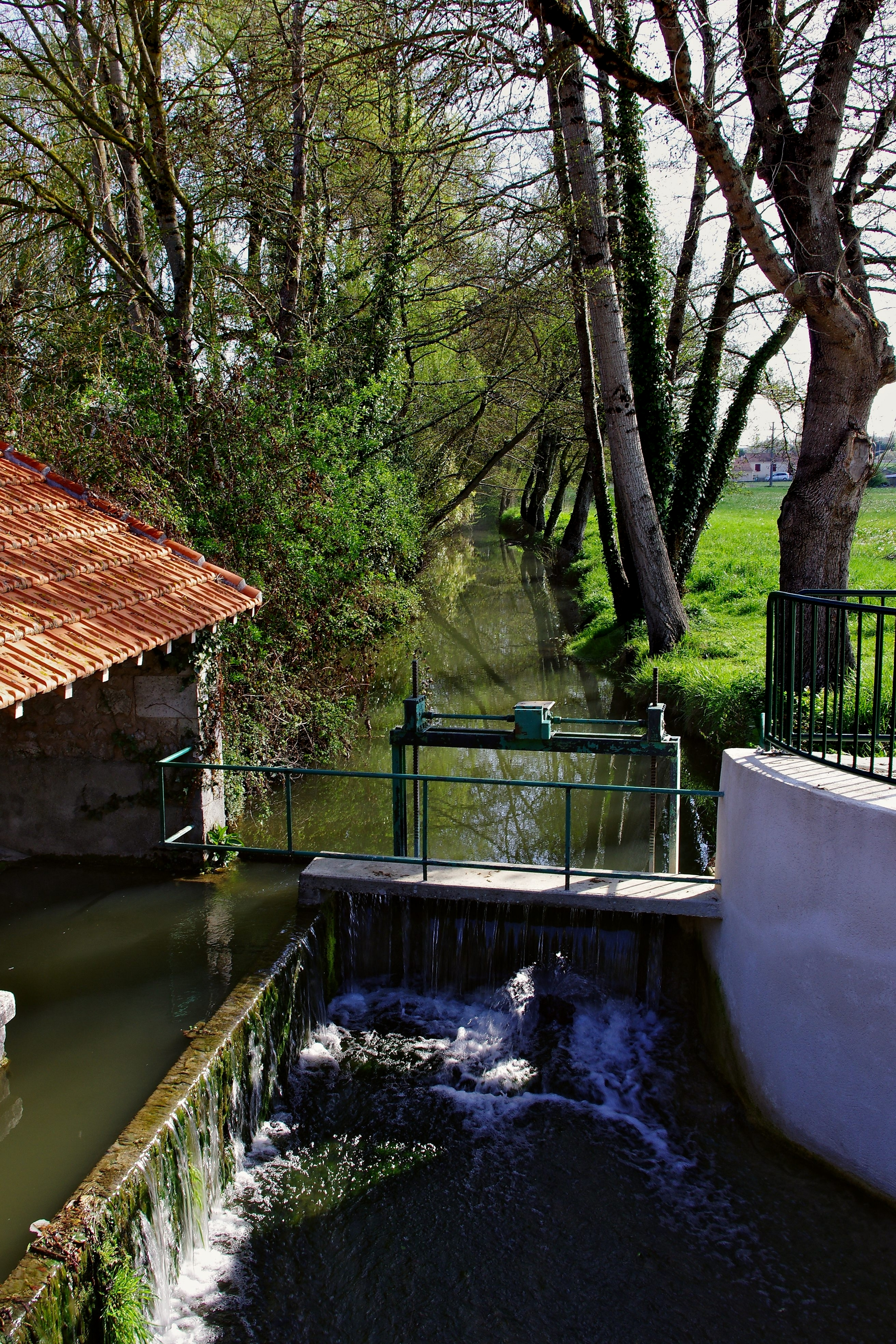
- The Né at the bridge to Blanzac

- Location within France Location within Nouvelle-Aquitaine

Location
- Country: France

Physical characteristics
- Source
  - location: Baraud
- Mouth
  - location: Charente
  - coordinates: 45°41′00″N 0°24′39″W
- Length: 66.1 km (41.1 mi)

Basin features
- Progression: Charente→ Atlantic Ocean

The Né (French pronunciation: [ne]) is a 66.1-kilometre (41.1 mi) river in the Charente and Charente-Maritime départements, in southwestern France. It is a left tributary of the Charente.

== Communes and cantons crossed ==
The Né flows through 25 communes and 6 cantons:

In upstream to downstream order, Bécheresse (source), Voulgézac, Pérignac, Coteaux du Blanzacais, Val-des-Vignes, Ladiville, Bellevigne, Vignolles, Saint-Médard, Barbezieux-Saint-Hilaire, Lagarde-sur-le-Né, Lachaise, Criteuil-la-Magdeleine, Verrières, Saint-Palais-du-Né, Cierzac, Saint-Fort-sur-le-Né, Germignac, Saint-Martial-sur-Né, Celles, Salles-d'Angles, Gimeux, Ars, Merpins and Salignac-sur-Charente (confluence).

The Né runs through the cantons of Charente-Sud, Boëme-Échelle, Charente-Champagne, Jonzac, Cognac-2 and Thénac.

== Hydronymy and names ==
The ancient forms are "aquam vocatam Net" around 1090, "usque ad Ne" around 1145, "in riberia Neti et in terris ultra Netum" in the 12th century, "prope Nedum" in 1229, "prope fluvium Ne" in the first quarter of the 13th century, "in loco qui dicitur Capd Nedi" around 1300. The name may have a Celtic root.

The Né gives its name to four municipalities: Lagarde-sur-le-Né, Saint-Fort-sur-le-Né, Saint-Martial-sur-Né, Saint-Palais-du-Né.
