= Vibrac =

Vibrac may refer to:

- Vibrac, Charente
- Vibrac, Charente-Maritime
