= Touzac =

Touzac may refer to the following places in France:

- Touzac, Charente, a commune in the Charente department
- Touzac, Lot, a commune in the Lot department
