= Saint-Preuil =

- Commune
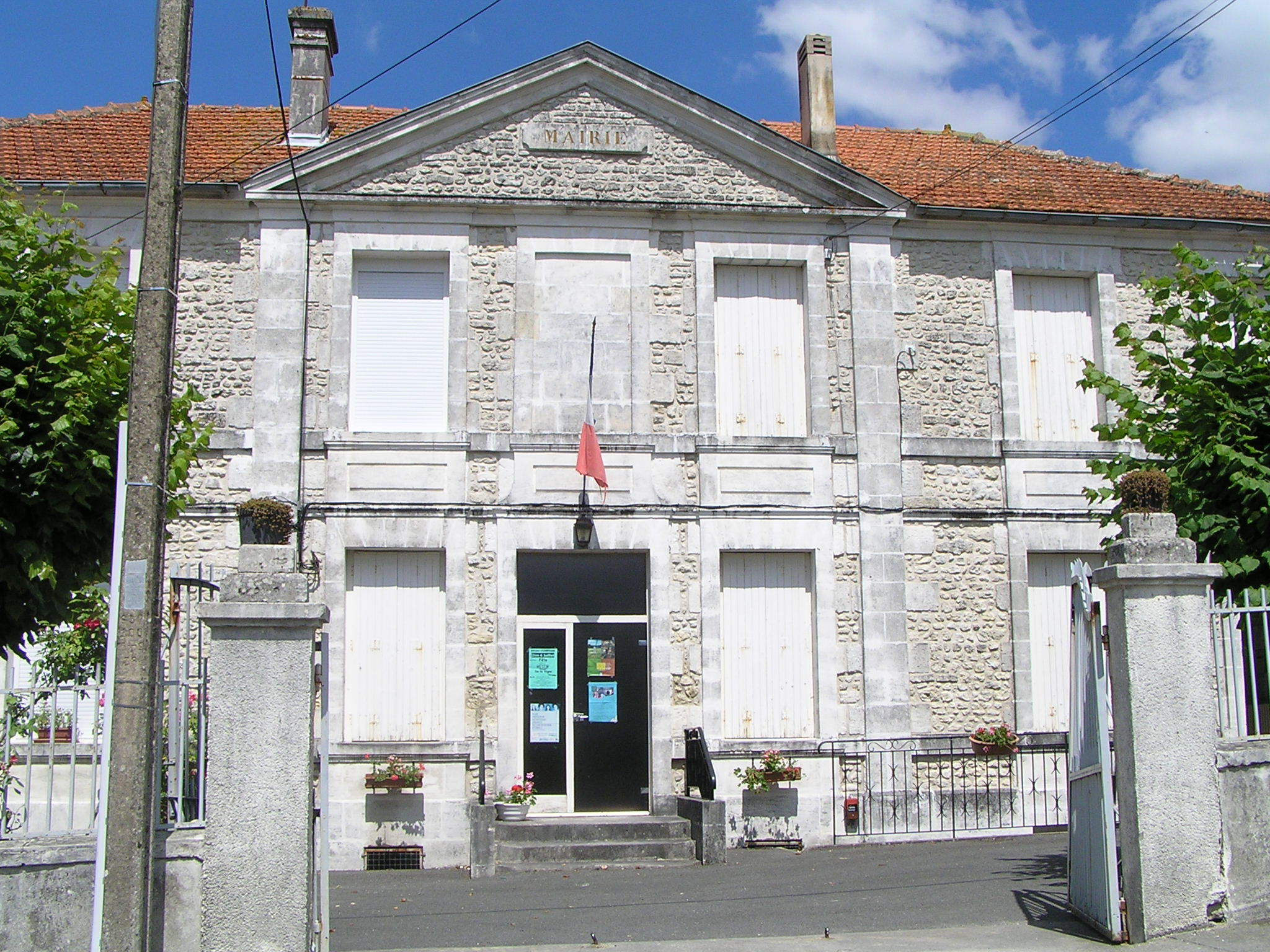
- Town hall
- Location of Saint-Preuil
- Location within France Location within Nouvelle-Aquitaine
- Coordinates: 45°35′49″N 0°10′15″W
- Country: France
- Region: Nouvelle-Aquitaine
- Department: Charente
- Arrondissement: Cognac
- Canton: Charente-Champagne
- Intercommunality: CA Grand Cognac

Government
  - Mayor (2020–2026): Marie-Jeanne Vian
- Area^{1}: 12.39 km^{2} (4.78 sq mi)
- Elevation: 96 m (315 ft)
- Highest elevation: 146 m (479 ft)
- Lowest elevation: 40 m (130 ft)
- Population (2023): 306
  - Density: 24.7/km^{2} (64.0/sq mi)
- Time zone: UTC+01:00 (CET)
  - Summer (DST): UTC+02:00 (CEST)
- INSEE/Postal code: 16343 /16130
- ^{1} French Land Register data, which excludes lakes, ponds, glaciers > 1 km^{2} (0.386 sq mi or 247 acres) and river estuaries.

Saint-Preuil (French pronunciation: [sɛ̃ pʁœj]) is a commune in the Charente department in southwestern France.

== Population ==
Historical population
Year	Pop.	±% p.a.
1968	408	—
1975	368	−1.46%
1982	317	−2.11%
1990	288	−1.19%
1999	289	+0.04%
2007	300	+0.47%
2012	282	−1.23%
2017	292	+0.70%
2023	306	+0.78%
Source: INSEE

== See also ==
- Communes of the Charente department
