= Châteaubernard =

- Commune
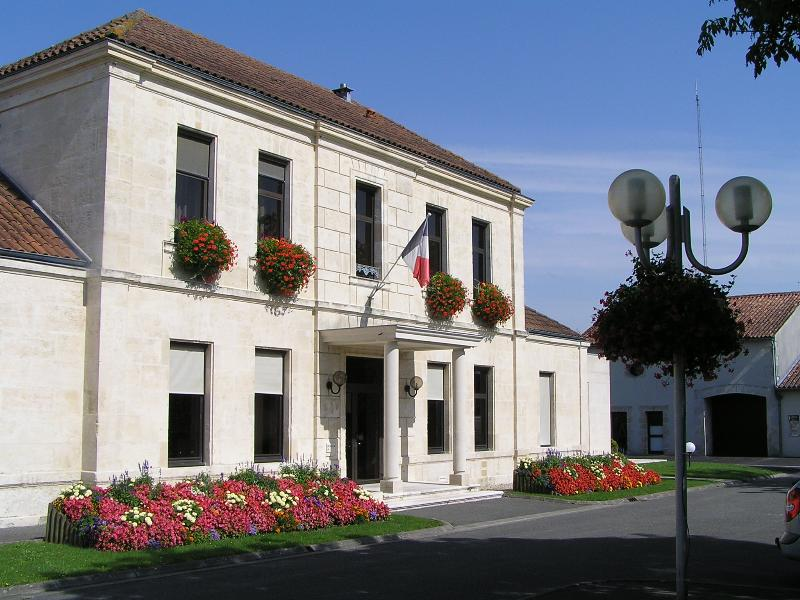
- Town hall

- Coat of arms
- Location of Châteaubernard
- Location within France Location within Nouvelle-Aquitaine
- Coordinates: 45°40′24″N 0°18′47″W
- Country: France
- Region: Nouvelle-Aquitaine
- Department: Charente
- Arrondissement: Cognac
- Canton: Cognac-2
- Intercommunality: CA Grand Cognac

Government
  - Mayor (2020–2026): Pierre Yves Briand
- Area^{1}: 13.31 km^{2} (5.14 sq mi)
- Elevation: 40 m (130 ft)
- Highest elevation: 53 m (174 ft)
- Lowest elevation: 7 m (23 ft)
- Population (2023): 3,878
  - Density: 291.4/km^{2} (754.6/sq mi)
- Time zone: UTC+01:00 (CET)
  - Summer (DST): UTC+02:00 (CEST)
- INSEE/Postal code: 16089 /16100
- ^{1} French Land Register data, which excludes lakes, ponds, glaciers > 1 km^{2} (0.386 sq mi or 247 acres) and river estuaries.

Châteaubernard (French pronunciation: [ʃatobɛʁnaʁ]) is a commune in the Charente department in southwestern France.

== Population ==
Historical population

Year	Pop.	±% p.a.
1793	252	—
1800	264	+0.67%
1806	250	−0.90%
1821	261	+0.29%
1831	305	+1.57%
1841	314	+0.29%
1872	898	+3.45%
1876	982	+2.26%
1881	914	−1.42%
1886	1,023	+2.28%
1891	1,140	+2.19%
1896	1,280	+2.34%
1901	1,408	+1.92%
1906	1,463	+0.77%
1911	1,462	−0.01%
1921	1,415	−0.33%

Year	Pop.	±% p.a.
1926	1,437	+0.31%
1931	1,451	+0.19%
1936	1,383	−0.96%
1946	1,915	+3.31%
1954	2,869	+5.18%
1962	3,459	+2.37%
1968	3,486	+0.13%
1975	3,852	+1.44%
1982	3,957	+0.38%
1990	3,769	−0.61%
1999	3,532	−0.72%
2007	3,884	+1.19%
2012	3,666	−1.15%
2017	3,714	+0.26%
2023	3,878	+0.72%

Source: EHESS and INSEE (1968-2023)

== See also ==
- Communes of the Charente department
