= Touzac, Charente =

Touzac
- Part of Bellevigne
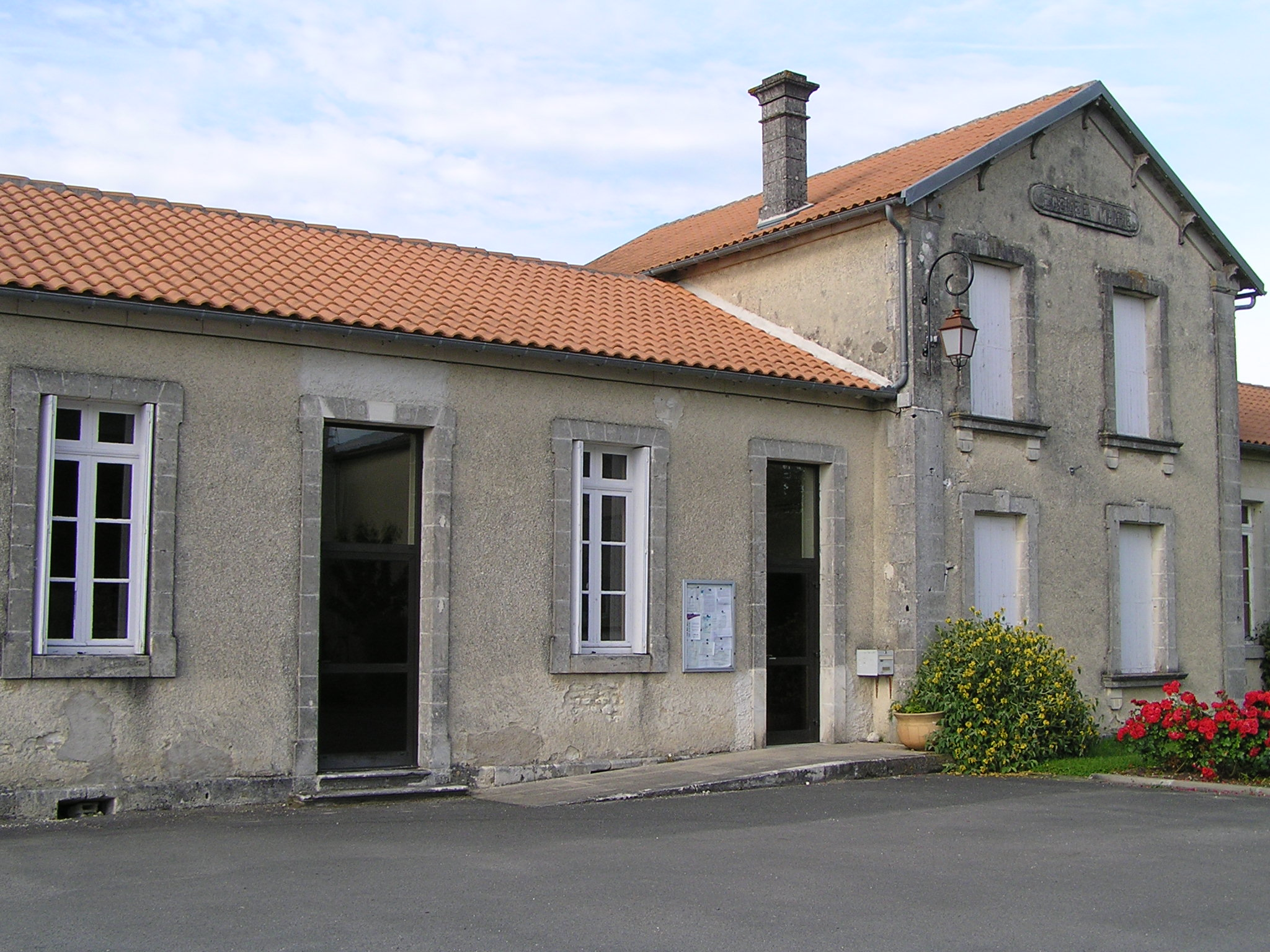
- Town hall
- Location of Touzac
- Location within France Location within Nouvelle-Aquitaine
- Coordinates: 45°33′05″N 0°09′17″W
- Country: France
- Region: Nouvelle-Aquitaine
- Department: Charente
- Arrondissement: Cognac
- Canton: Charente-Champagne
- Commune: Bellevigne
- Area^{1}: 15.65 km^{2} (6.04 sq mi)
- Elevation: 92 m (302 ft)
- Highest elevation: 151 m (495 ft)
- Lowest elevation: 36 m (118 ft)
- Population (2023): 380
  - Density: 24/km^{2} (63/sq mi)
- Time zone: UTC+01:00 (CET)
  - Summer (DST): UTC+02:00 (CEST)
- Postal code: 16120
- ^{1} French Land Register data, which excludes lakes, ponds, glaciers > 1 km^{2} (0.386 sq mi or 247 acres) and river estuaries.

Touzac (French pronunciation: [tuzak]) is a former commune in the Charente department in southwestern France. On 1 January 2017, it was merged into the new commune Bellevigne.

== See also ==
- Communes of the Charente department
