= Châteauneuf-sur-Charente =

- Commune
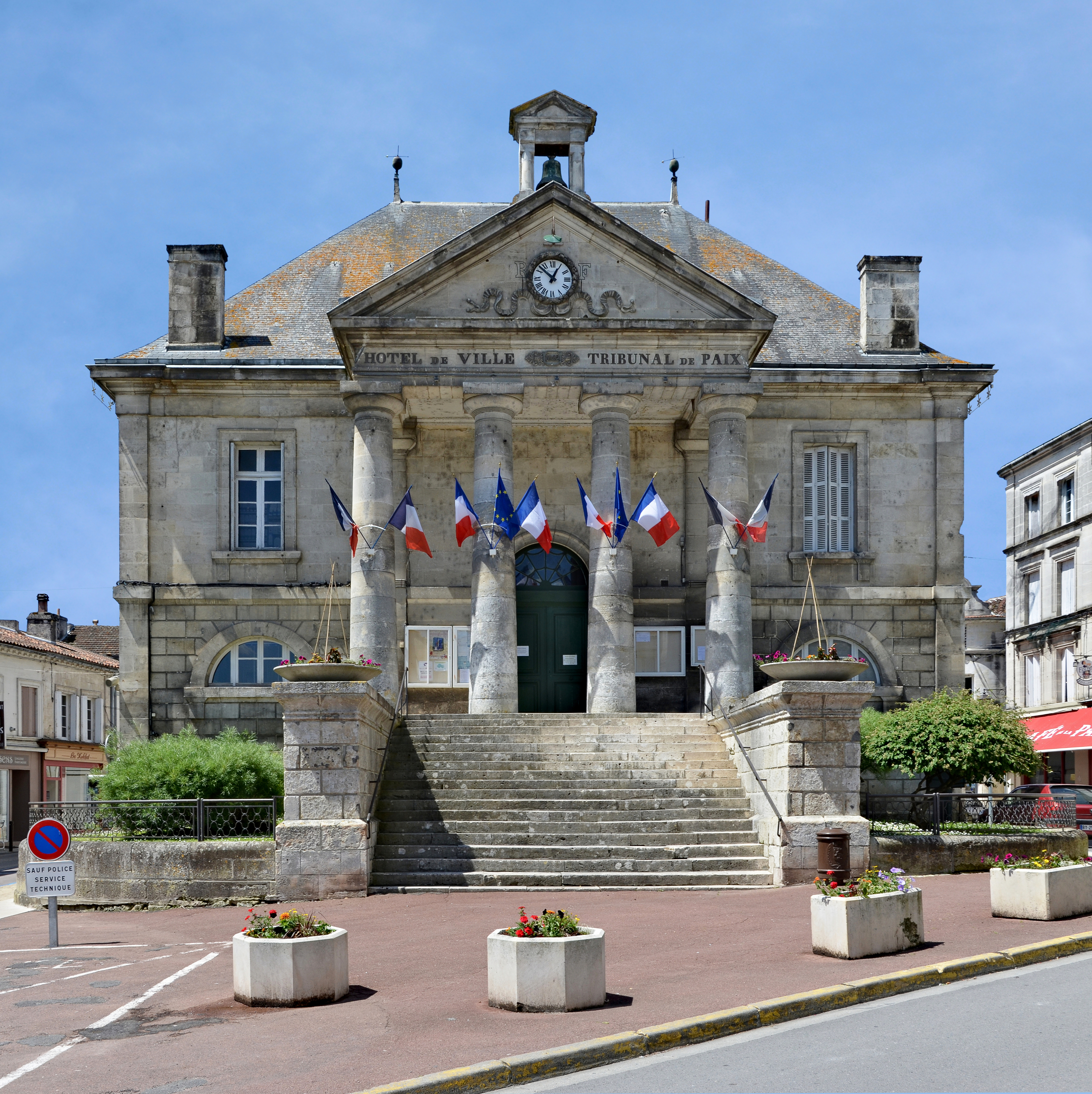
- Town hall

- Coat of arms
- Location of Châteauneuf-sur-Charente
- Location within France Location within Nouvelle-Aquitaine
- Coordinates: 45°35′58″N 0°03′09″W
- Country: France
- Region: Nouvelle-Aquitaine
- Department: Charente
- Arrondissement: Cognac
- Canton: Charente-Champagne
- Intercommunality: CA Grand Cognac

Government
  - Mayor (2020–2026): Jean-Louis Lévesque
- Area^{1}: 24.02 km^{2} (9.27 sq mi)
- Highest elevation: 99 m (325 ft)
- Lowest elevation: 16 m (52 ft)
- Population (2023): 3,550
  - Density: 148/km^{2} (383/sq mi)
- Time zone: UTC+01:00 (CET)
  - Summer (DST): UTC+02:00 (CEST)
- INSEE/Postal code: 16090 /16120
- ^{1} French Land Register data, which excludes lakes, ponds, glaciers > 1 km^{2} (0.386 sq mi or 247 acres) and river estuaries.

Châteauneuf-sur-Charente (French pronunciation: [ʃɑtonœf syʁ ʃaʁɑ̃t]; literally 'Châteauneuf on Charente') is a commune in Charente, a department in southwestern France. It is the seat of the canton of Charente-Champagne, and part of the Communauté d'agglomération du Grand Cognac.

The town is on the banks of the Charente, on the left bank of a large meander.

== Church ==
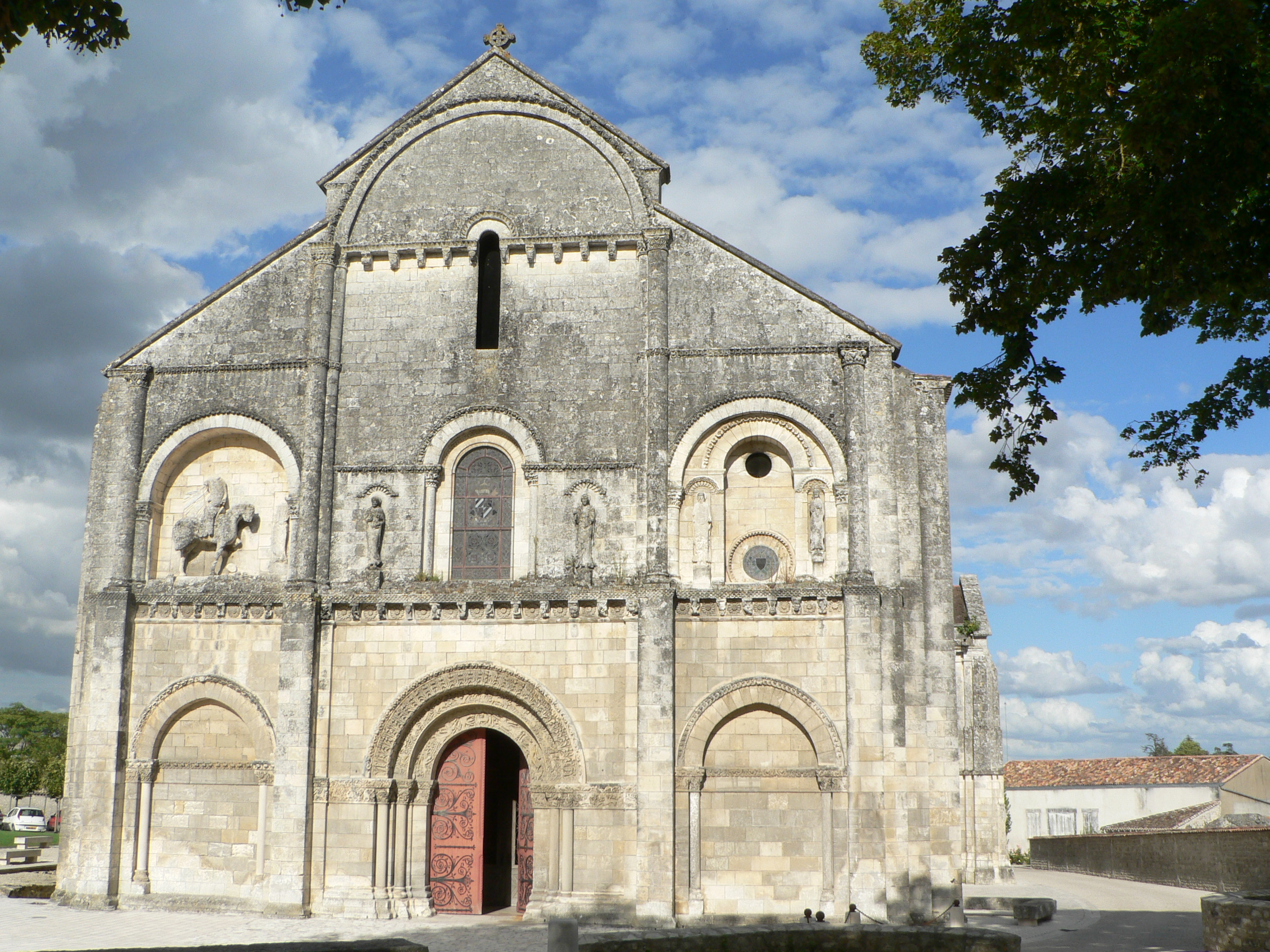
The church of Châteauneuf

The parish church of St. Peter has a facade divided into three arcades. The church is partly 12th century, partly 15th century. There is a square bell tower at the north end of the transept.

== Population ==
Historical population

Year	Pop.	±% p.a.
1793	2,156	—
1800	2,184	+0.18%
1806	2,153	−0.24%
1821	2,277	+0.37%
1831	2,346	+0.30%
1841	2,336	−0.04%
1846	2,739	+3.23%
1851	3,030	+2.04%
1856	3,034	+0.03%
1861	3,565	+3.28%
1866	3,541	−0.14%
1872	3,750	+0.96%
1876	3,774	+0.16%
1881	3,204	−3.22%
1886	3,174	−0.19%
1891	2,888	−1.87%
1896	2,783	−0.74%
1901	2,870	+0.62%

Year	Pop.	±% p.a.
1906	2,996	+0.86%
1911	3,025	+0.19%
1921	2,808	−0.74%
1926	2,876	+0.48%
1931	3,020	+0.98%
1936	2,975	−0.30%
1946	3,002	+0.09%
1954	3,015	+0.05%
1962	3,285	+1.08%
1968	3,475	+0.94%
1975	3,500	+0.10%
1982	3,554	+0.22%
1990	3,522	−0.11%
1999	3,422	−0.32%
2007	3,451	+0.11%
2012	3,432	−0.11%
2017	3,536	+0.60%
2023	3,550	+0.07%

Source: EHESS and INSEE (1968-2023)

== See also ==
- Communes of the Charente department
