= Graves-Saint-Amant =

- Commune
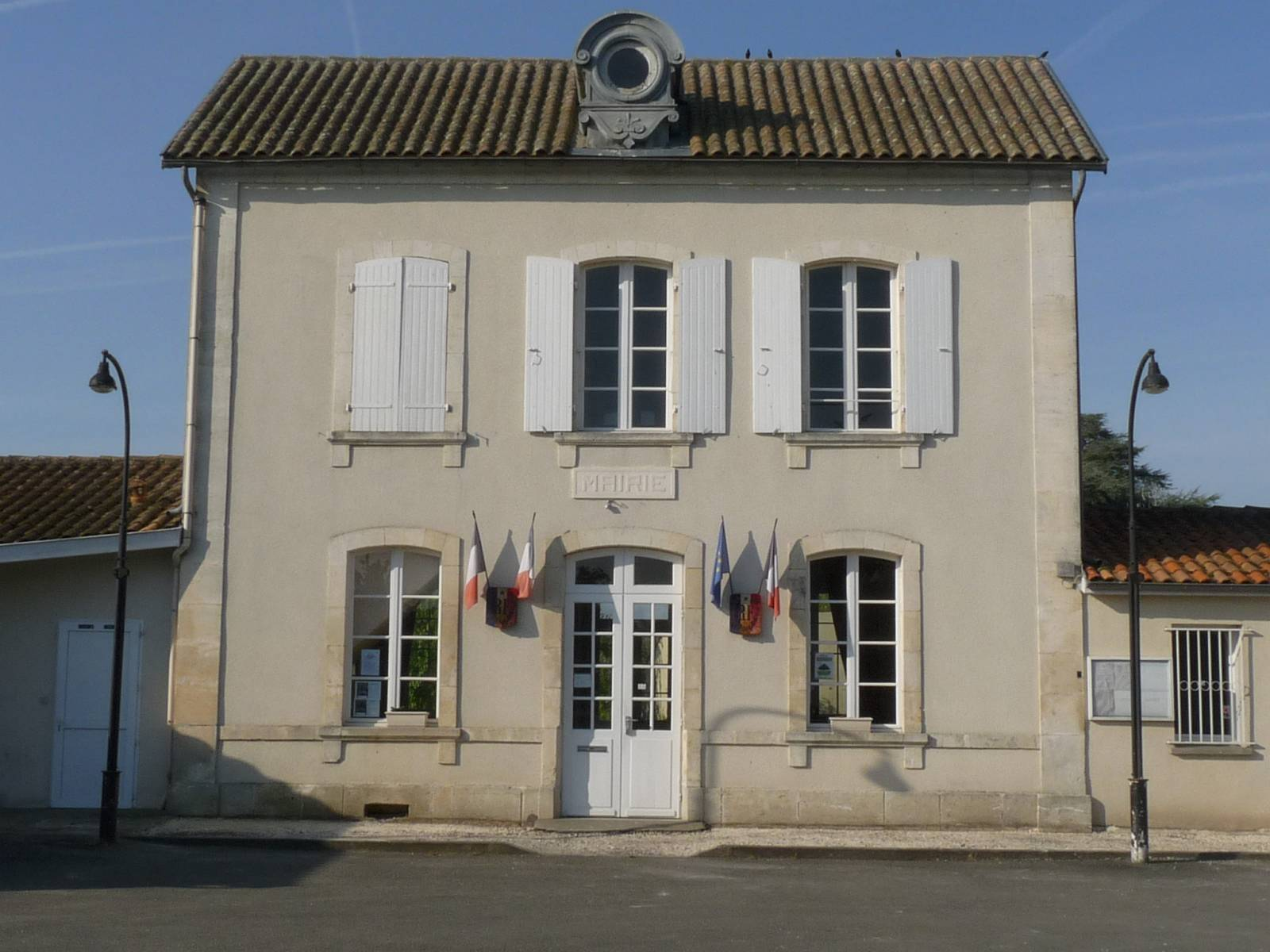
- The town hall in Graves-Saint-Amant

- Coat of arms
- Location of Graves-Saint-Amant
- Location within France Location within Nouvelle-Aquitaine
- Coordinates: 45°38′40″N 0°05′34″W
- Country: France
- Region: Nouvelle-Aquitaine
- Department: Charente
- Arrondissement: Cognac
- Canton: Charente-Champagne
- Intercommunality: CA Grand Cognac

Government
  - Mayor (2020–2026): Christian Jobit
- Area^{1}: 8.99 km^{2} (3.47 sq mi)
- Elevation: 22 m (72 ft)
- Highest elevation: 97 m (318 ft)
- Lowest elevation: 14 m (46 ft)
- Population (2023): 326
  - Density: 36.3/km^{2} (93.9/sq mi)
- Time zone: UTC+01:00 (CET)
  - Summer (DST): UTC+02:00 (CEST)
- INSEE/Postal code: 16297 /16120
- ^{1} French Land Register data, which excludes lakes, ponds, glaciers > 1 km^{2} (0.386 sq mi or 247 acres) and river estuaries.

Graves-Saint-Amant (French pronunciation: [ɡʁav sɛ̃.t‿amɑ̃]) is a commune in the Charente department in southwestern France.

== Population ==
Historical population
Year	Pop.	±% p.a.
1968	398	—
1975	358	−1.50%
1982	330	−1.16%
1990	370	+1.44%
1999	338	−1.00%
2007	317	−0.80%
2012	339	+1.35%
2017	334	−0.30%
2023	326	−0.40%
Source: INSEE

== See also ==
- Communes of the Charente department
