= Lagarde-sur-le-Né =

- Commune
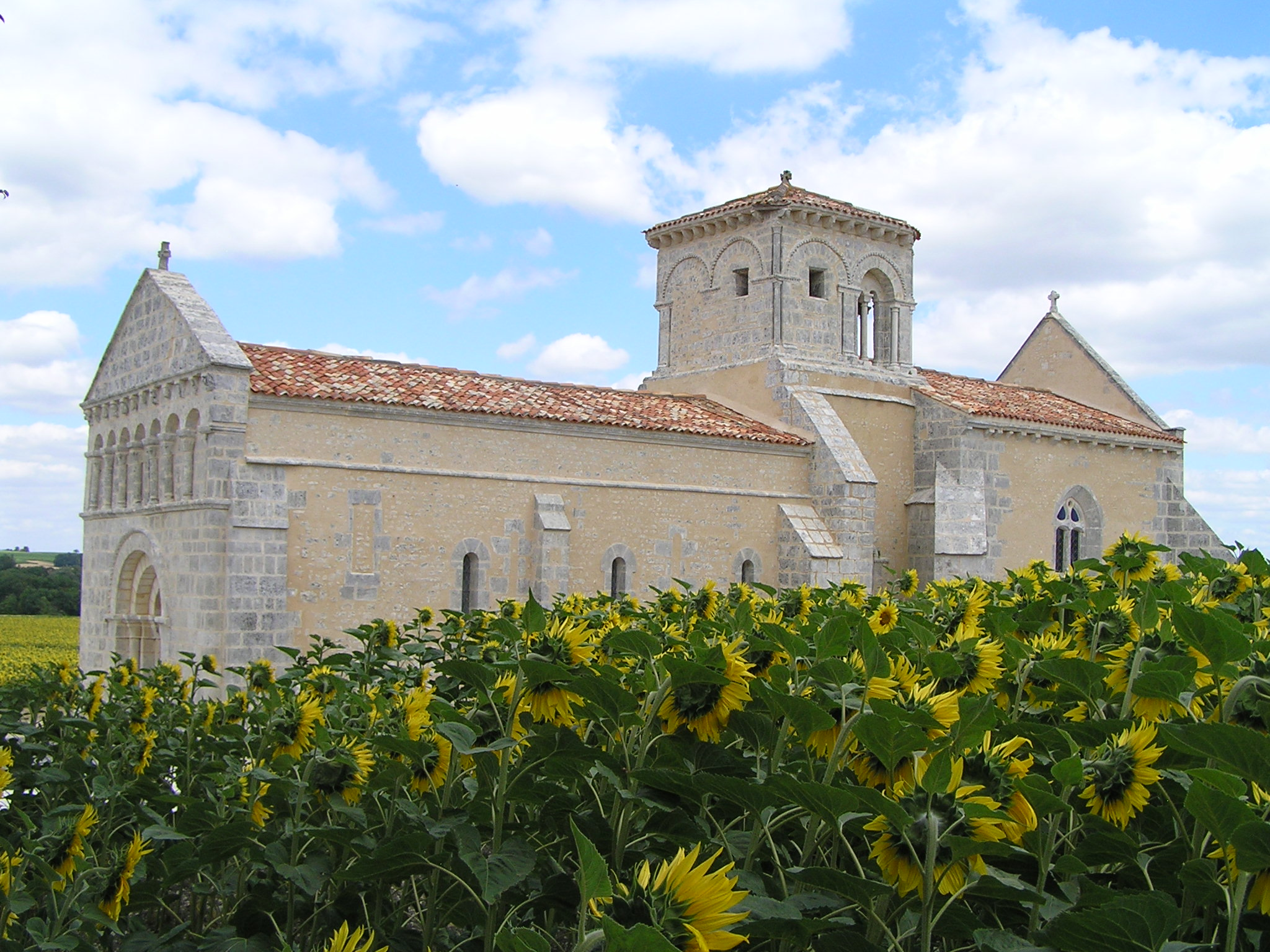
- The church in Lagarde-sur-le-Né
- Location of Lagarde-sur-le-Né
- Location within France Location within Nouvelle-Aquitaine
- Coordinates: 45°30′44″N 0°12′10″W
- Country: France
- Region: Nouvelle-Aquitaine
- Department: Charente
- Arrondissement: Cognac
- Canton: Charente-Sud
- Intercommunality: 4B Sud-Charente

Government
  - Mayor (2020–2026): Alain Testaud
- Area^{1}: 4.12 km^{2} (1.59 sq mi)
- Elevation: 49 m (161 ft)
- Highest elevation: 68 m (223 ft)
- Lowest elevation: 30 m (98 ft)
- Population (2023): 189
  - Density: 45.9/km^{2} (119/sq mi)
- Time zone: UTC+01:00 (CET)
  - Summer (DST): UTC+02:00 (CEST)
- INSEE/Postal code: 16178 /16300
- ^{1} French Land Register data, which excludes lakes, ponds, glaciers > 1 km^{2} (0.386 sq mi or 247 acres) and river estuaries.

Lagarde-sur-le-Né (French pronunciation: [laɡaʁd syʁ lə ne], literally Lagarde on the Né) is a commune in the Charente department in southwestern France.

== Population ==
Historical population
| Year | Pop. | ±% p.a. |
|---|---|---|
| 1968 | 164 | — |
| 1975 | 146 | −1.65% |
| 1982 | 169 | +2.11% |
| 1990 | 169 | +0.00% |
| 1999 | 174 | +0.32% |
| 2007 | 179 | +0.35% |
| 2012 | 174 | −0.57% |
| 2017 | 184 | +1.12% |
| 2023 | 189 | +0.45% |
Source: INSEE

== See also ==
- Communes of the Charente department
