= Bonneuil, Charente =

Bonneuil
- Commune
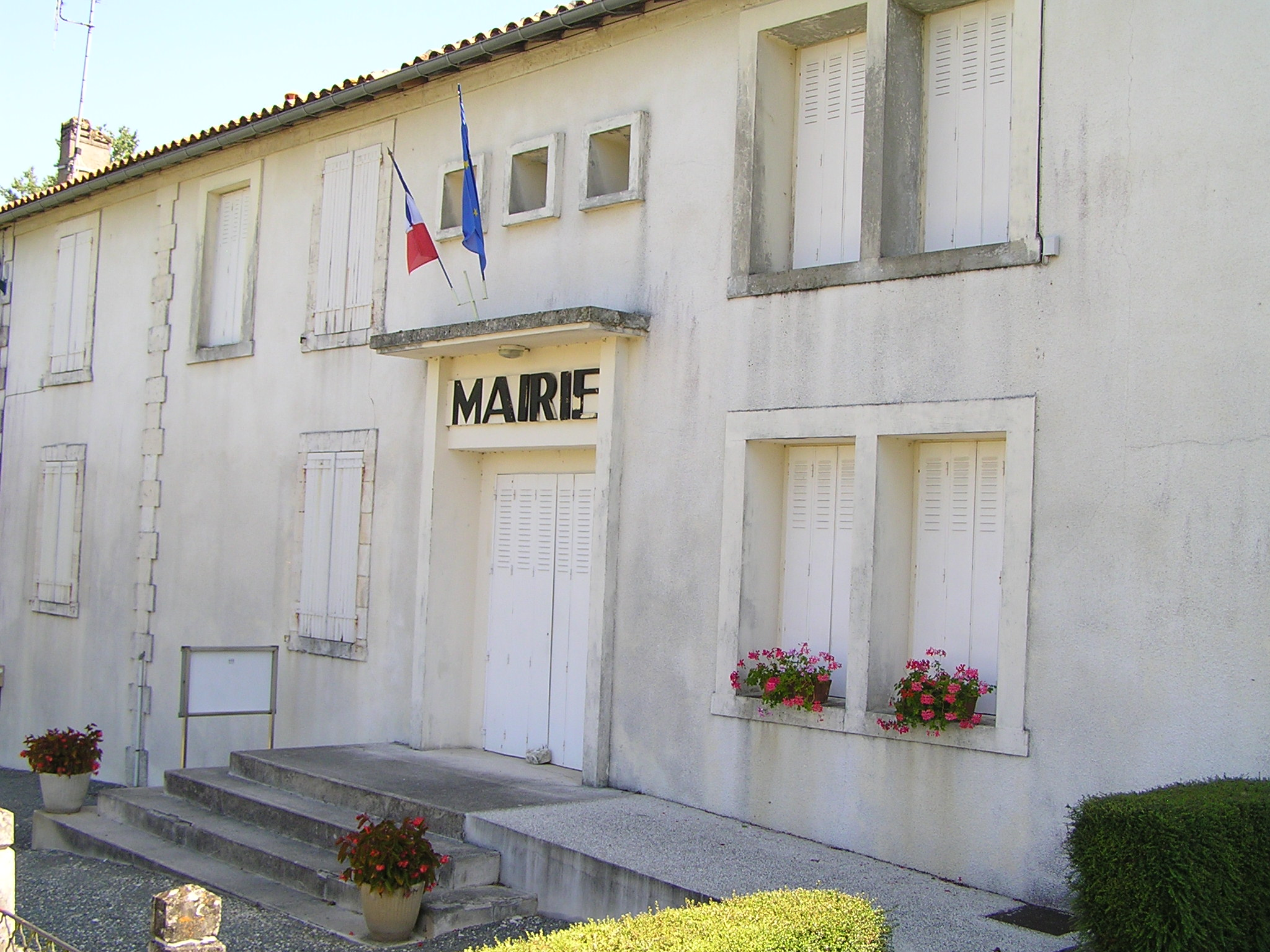
- Town hall
- Location of Bonneuil
- Location within France Location within Nouvelle-Aquitaine
- Coordinates: 45°34′37″N 0°08′20″W
- Country: France
- Region: Nouvelle-Aquitaine
- Department: Charente
- Arrondissement: Cognac
- Canton: Charente-Champagne
- Intercommunality: CA Grand Cognac

Government
  - Mayor (2020–2026): Bruno Naudin-Berthier
- Area^{1}: 13.58 km^{2} (5.24 sq mi)
- Elevation: 100 m (330 ft)
- Highest elevation: 154 m (505 ft)
- Lowest elevation: 58 m (190 ft)
- Population (2023): 247
  - Density: 18.2/km^{2} (47.1/sq mi)
- Time zone: UTC+01:00 (CET)
  - Summer (DST): UTC+02:00 (CEST)
- INSEE/Postal code: 16050 /16120
- ^{1} French Land Register data, which excludes lakes, ponds, glaciers > 1 km^{2} (0.386 sq mi or 247 acres) and river estuaries.

Bonneuil (French pronunciation: [bɔnœj]) is a commune in the Charente department in southwestern France.

== Population ==
Historical population
Year	Pop.	±% p.a.
1968	373	—
1975	345	−1.11%
1982	302	−1.88%
1990	245	−2.58%
1999	248	+0.14%
2007	246	−0.10%
2012	262	+1.27%
2017	260	−0.15%
2023	247	−0.85%
Source: INSEE

== See also ==
- Communes of the Charente department
