= Angeac-Charente =

- Commune
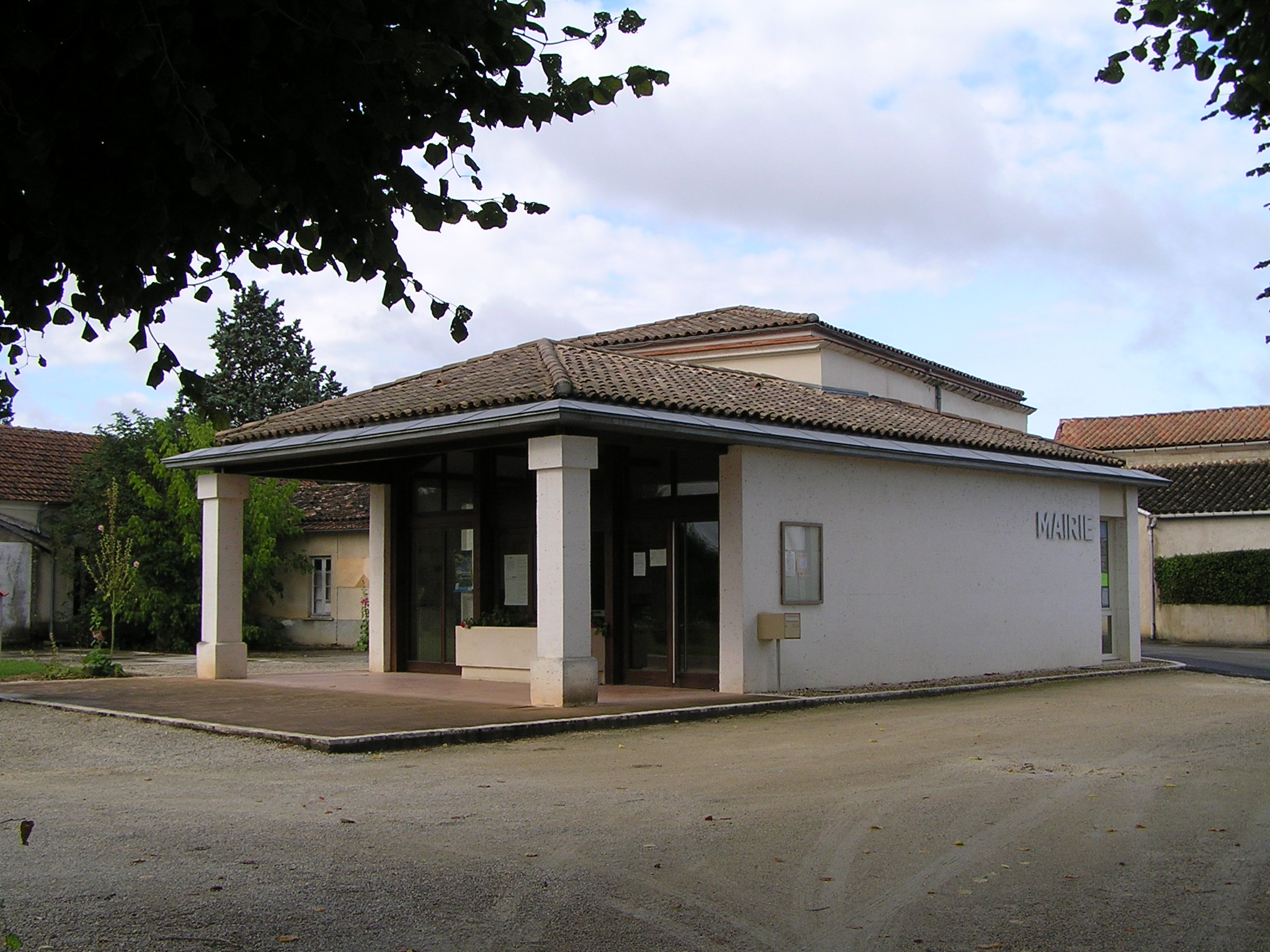
- Town hall

- Coat of arms
- Location of Angeac-Charente
- Location within France Location within Nouvelle-Aquitaine
- Coordinates: 45°37′53″N 0°04′26″W
- Country: France
- Region: Nouvelle-Aquitaine
- Department: Charente
- Arrondissement: Cognac
- Canton: Charente-Champagne
- Intercommunality: CA Grand Cognac

Government
  - Mayor (2022–2026): Hélène Brisson
- Area^{1}: 10.81 km^{2} (4.17 sq mi)
- Elevation: 25 m (82 ft)
- Highest elevation: 100 m (330 ft)
- Lowest elevation: 15 m (49 ft)
- Population (2023): 287
  - Density: 26.5/km^{2} (68.8/sq mi)
- Time zone: UTC+01:00 (CET)
  - Summer (DST): UTC+02:00 (CEST)
- INSEE/Postal code: 16013 /16120
- ^{1} French Land Register data, which excludes lakes, ponds, glaciers > 1 km^{2} (0.386 sq mi or 247 acres) and river estuaries.

Angeac-Charente (French pronunciation: [ɑ̃ʒak ʃaʁɑ̃t]) is a commune in the Charente department in southwestern France.

== Population ==
Historical population
Year	Pop.	±% p.a.
1968	389	—
1975	393	+0.15%
1982	378	−0.55%
1990	387	+0.29%
1999	399	+0.34%
2007	379	−0.64%
2012	365	−0.75%
2017	329	−2.06%
2023	287	−2.25%
Source: INSEE

== See also ==
- Communes of the Charente department
