= Saint-Palais-du-Né =

- Commune
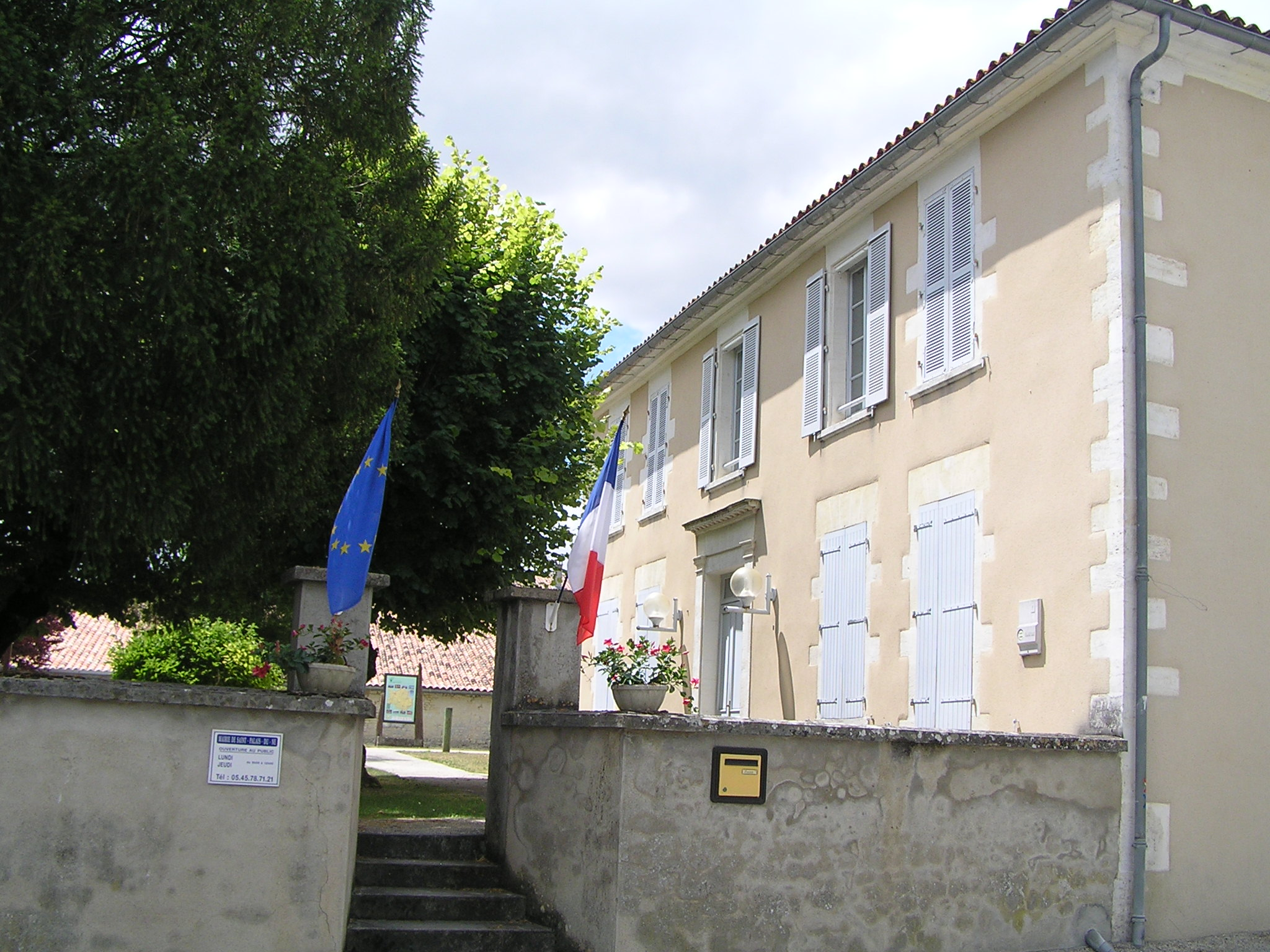
- Town hall

- Coat of arms
- Location of Saint-Palais-du-Né
- Location within France Location within Nouvelle-Aquitaine
- Coordinates: 45°32′56″N 0°16′46″W
- Country: France
- Region: Nouvelle-Aquitaine
- Department: Charente
- Arrondissement: Cognac
- Canton: Charente-Sud

Government
  - Mayor (2020–2026): Allain Dubroca
- Area^{1}: 13.6 km^{2} (5.3 sq mi)
- Elevation: 31 m (102 ft)
- Highest elevation: 86 m (282 ft)
- Lowest elevation: 21 m (69 ft)
- Population (2023): 305
  - Density: 22.4/km^{2} (58.1/sq mi)
- Time zone: UTC+01:00 (CET)
  - Summer (DST): UTC+02:00 (CEST)
- INSEE/Postal code: 16342 /16300
- ^{1} French Land Register data, which excludes lakes, ponds, glaciers > 1 km^{2} (0.386 sq mi or 247 acres) and river estuaries.

Saint-Palais-du-Né (French pronunciation: [sɛ̃ palɛ dy ne], literally Saint-Palais of the Né) is a commune in the Charente department in southwestern France.

== Population ==
Historical population
Year	Pop.	±% p.a.
1968	294	—
1975	288	−0.29%
1982	311	+1.10%
1990	282	−1.22%
1999	287	+0.20%
2007	277	−0.44%
2012	287	+0.71%
2017	289	+0.14%
2023	305	+0.90%
Source: INSEE

== See also ==
- Communes of the Charente department
