= Birac, Charente =

Birac
- Commune
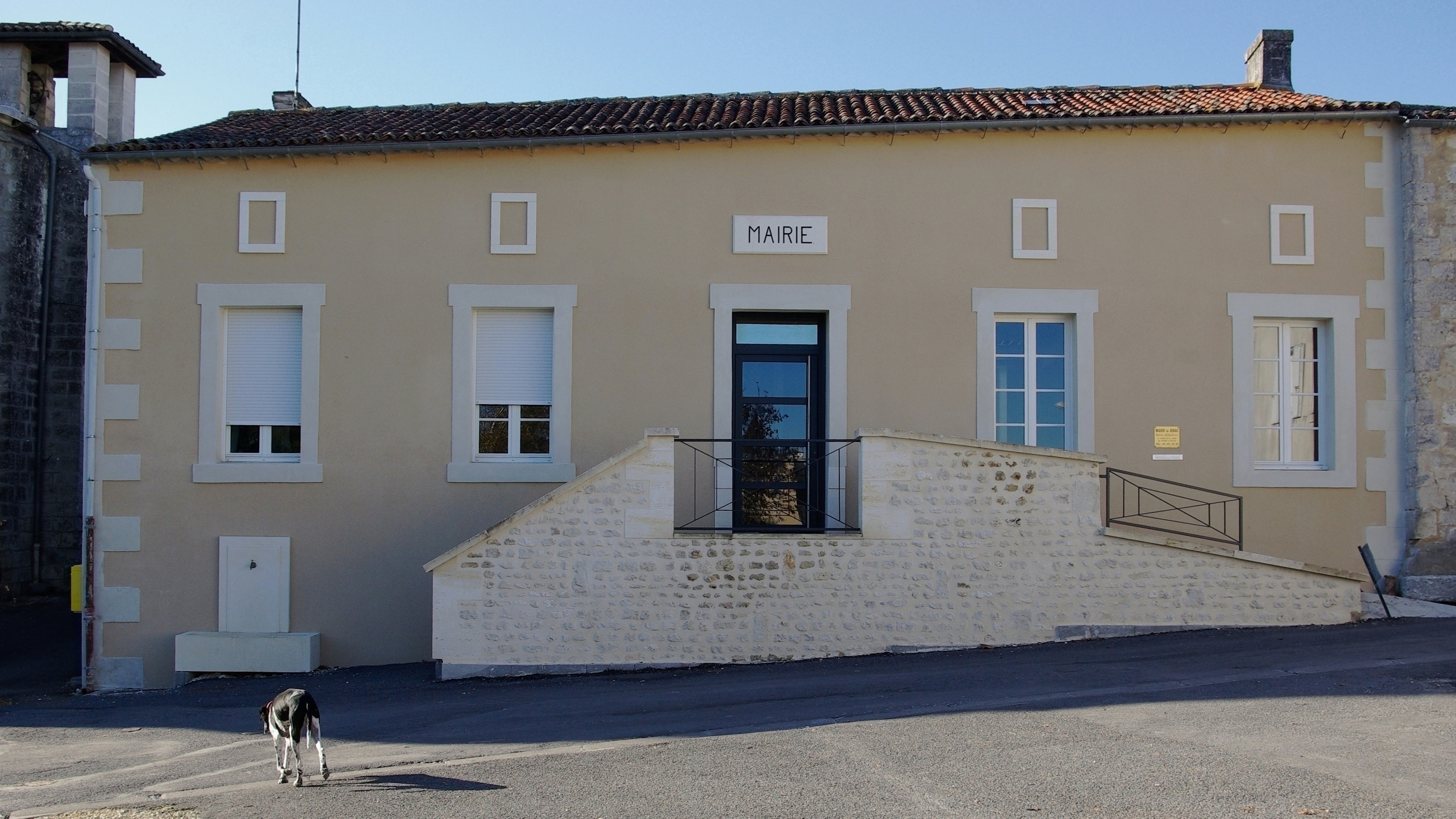
- Town hall
- Location of Birac
- Location within France Location within Nouvelle-Aquitaine
- Coordinates: 45°33′40″N 0°03′43″W
- Country: France
- Region: Nouvelle-Aquitaine
- Department: Charente
- Arrondissement: Cognac
- Canton: Charente-Champagne
- Intercommunality: CA Grand Cognac

Government
  - Mayor (2020–2026): Ludovic Pasierb
- Area^{1}: 11.84 km^{2} (4.57 sq mi)
- Elevation: 76 m (249 ft)
- Highest elevation: 131 m (430 ft)
- Lowest elevation: 49 m (161 ft)
- Population (2023): 374
  - Density: 31.6/km^{2} (81.8/sq mi)
- Time zone: UTC+01:00 (CET)
  - Summer (DST): UTC+02:00 (CEST)
- INSEE/Postal code: 16045 /16120
- ^{1} French Land Register data, which excludes lakes, ponds, glaciers > 1 km^{2} (0.386 sq mi or 247 acres) and river estuaries.

Birac (French pronunciation: [biʁak]) is a commune in the Charente department in southwestern France.

== Population ==
Historical population
Year	Pop.	±% p.a.
1968	246	—
1975	237	−0.53%
1982	221	−0.99%
1990	234	+0.72%
1999	214	−0.99%
2007	249	+1.91%
2012	368	+8.13%
2017	361	−0.38%
2023	374	+0.59%
Source: INSEE

== See also ==
- Communes of the Charente department
