= Saint-Martial-sur-Né =

- Commune
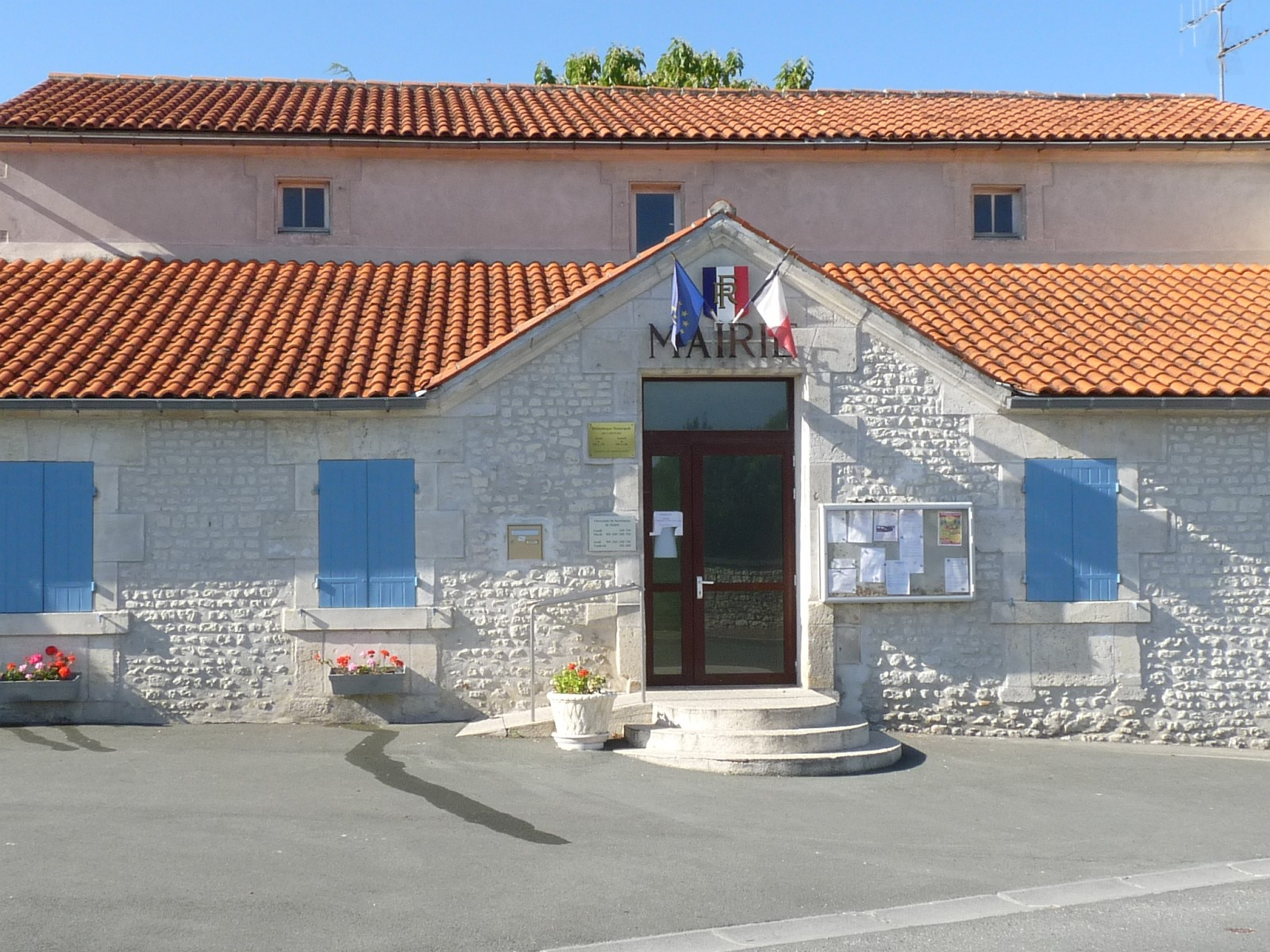
- The town hall in Saint-Martial-sur-Né
- Location of Saint-Martial-sur-Né
- Location within France Location within Nouvelle-Aquitaine
- Coordinates: 45°34′59″N 0°21′47″W
- Country: France
- Region: Nouvelle-Aquitaine
- Department: Charente-Maritime
- Arrondissement: Jonzac
- Canton: Jonzac

Government
  - Mayor (2020–2026): Christiane Brua
- Area^{1}: 11.6 km^{2} (4.5 sq mi)
- Elevation: 35 m (115 ft)
- Highest elevation: 68 m (223 ft)
- Lowest elevation: 12 m (39 ft)
- Population (2023): 425
  - Density: 36.6/km^{2} (94.9/sq mi)
- Time zone: UTC+01:00 (CET)
  - Summer (DST): UTC+02:00 (CEST)
- INSEE/Postal code: 17364 /17520
- ^{1} French Land Register data, which excludes lakes, ponds, glaciers > 1 km^{2} (0.386 sq mi or 247 acres) and river estuaries.

Saint-Martial-sur-Né (French pronunciation: [sɛ̃ maʁsjal syʁ ne], literally Saint-Martial on Né) is a commune in the Charente-Maritime department in the Nouvelle-Aquitaine region in southwestern France. The river Né, a tributary of the Charente, flows through the commune.

== Population ==
Historical population
Year	Pop.	±% p.a.
1968	414	—
1975	402	−0.42%
1982	367	−1.29%
1990	328	−1.39%
1999	354	+0.85%
2007	357	+0.11%
2012	442	+4.36%
2017	452	+0.45%
2023	425	−1.02%
Source: INSEE

== See also ==
- Communes of the Charente-Maritime department
