= Saint-Fort-sur-le-Né =

- Commune
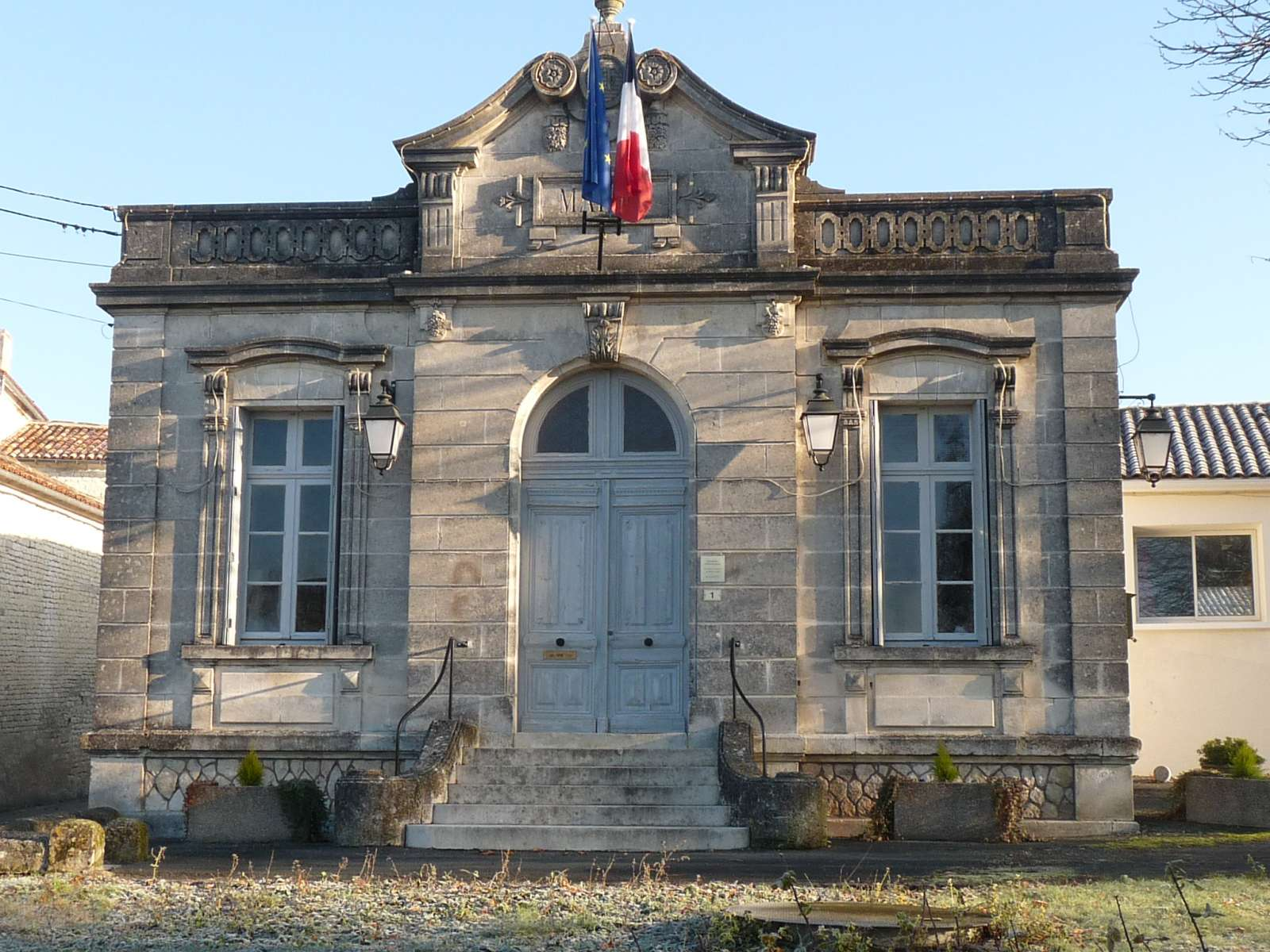
- The town hall in Saint-Fort-sur-le-Né

- Coat of arms
- Location of Saint-Fort-sur-le-Né
- Location within France Location within Nouvelle-Aquitaine
- Coordinates: 45°34′41″N 0°18′14″W
- Country: France
- Region: Nouvelle-Aquitaine
- Department: Charente
- Arrondissement: Cognac
- Canton: Charente-Champagne
- Intercommunality: CA Grand Cognac

Government
  - Mayor (2020–2026): Gilbert Rambeau
- Area^{1}: 6.80 km^{2} (2.63 sq mi)
- Elevation: 21 m (69 ft)
- Highest elevation: 65 m (213 ft)
- Lowest elevation: 16 m (52 ft)
- Population (2023): 386
  - Density: 56.8/km^{2} (147/sq mi)
- Time zone: UTC+01:00 (CET)
  - Summer (DST): UTC+02:00 (CEST)
- INSEE/Postal code: 16316 /16130
- ^{1} French Land Register data, which excludes lakes, ponds, glaciers > 1 km^{2} (0.386 sq mi or 247 acres) and river estuaries.

Saint-Fort-sur-le-Né (French pronunciation: [sɛ̃ fɔʁ syʁ lə ne], literally Saint-Fort on the Né) is a commune in the Charente department in southwestern France.

== Population ==
The people from Saint-Fort-sur-le-Né are called the Saint-Fortais.

Historical population
Year	Pop.	±% p.a.
1968	464	—
1975	406	−1.89%
1982	419	+0.45%
1990	402	−0.52%
1999	386	−0.45%
2007	399	+0.41%
2012	407	+0.40%
2017	372	−1.78%
2023	386	+0.62%
Source: INSEE

== Economy ==
Viticulture is Saint-Fort-sur-le-né's main production.

== See also ==
- Communes of the Charente department
