= Saint-Simon, Charente =

Saint-Simon
- Commune
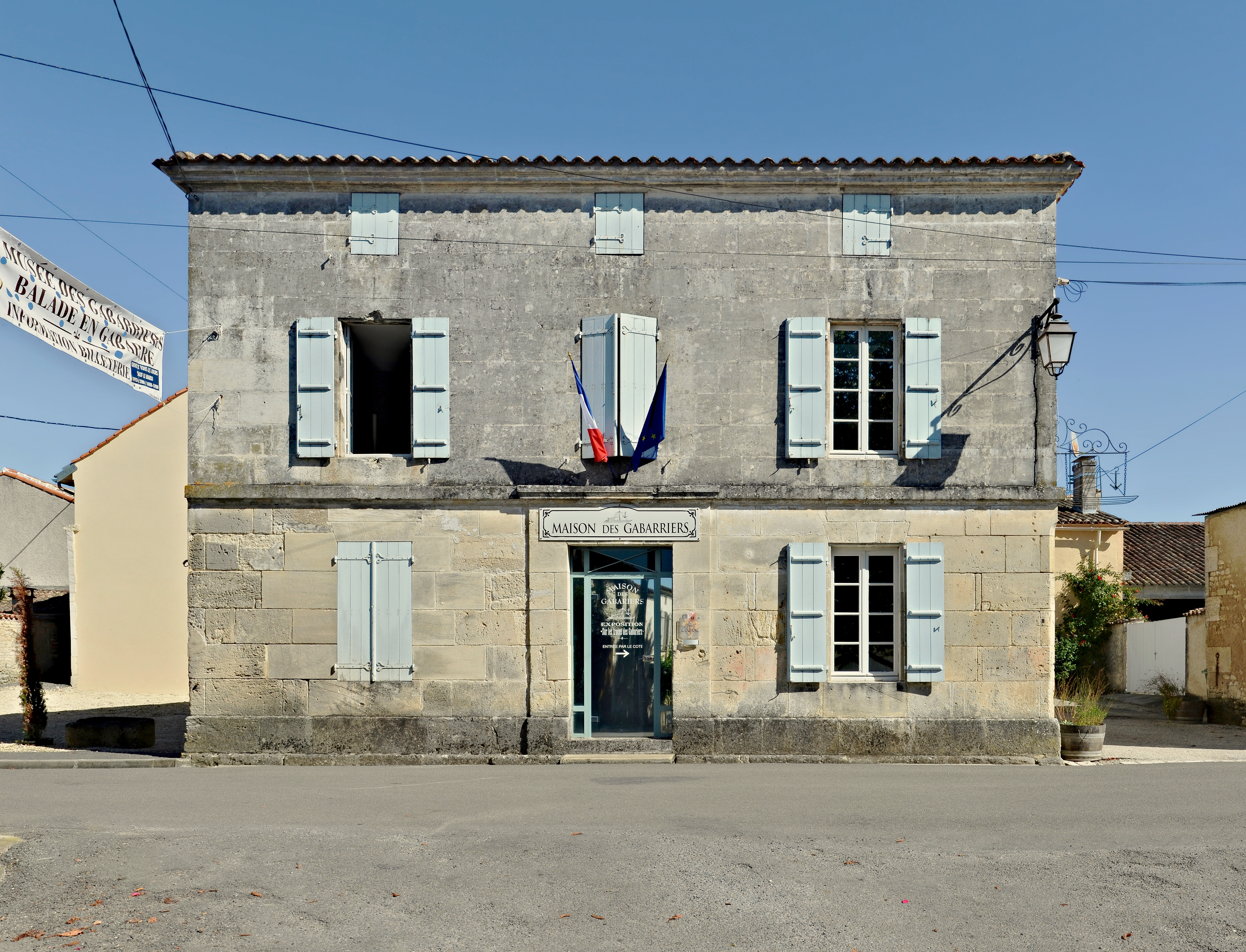
- The city hall is a local museum too

- Coat of arms
- Location of Saint-Simon
- Location within France Location within Nouvelle-Aquitaine
- Coordinates: 45°39′02″N 0°04′29″W
- Country: France
- Region: Nouvelle-Aquitaine
- Department: Charente
- Arrondissement: Cognac
- Canton: Charente-Champagne
- Intercommunality: CA Grand Cognac

Government
  - Mayor (2020–2026): Jean-Jacques Delage
- Area^{1}: 3.77 km^{2} (1.46 sq mi)
- Elevation: 20 m (66 ft)
- Highest elevation: 53 m (174 ft)
- Lowest elevation: 15 m (49 ft)
- Population (2023): 233
  - Density: 61.8/km^{2} (160/sq mi)
- Time zone: UTC+01:00 (CET)
  - Summer (DST): UTC+02:00 (CEST)
- INSEE/Postal code: 16352 /16120
- ^{1} French Land Register data, which excludes lakes, ponds, glaciers > 1 km^{2} (0.386 sq mi or 247 acres) and river estuaries.

Saint-Simon (French pronunciation: [sɛ̃ simɔ̃]) is a commune in the Charente department in southwestern France.

== Population ==
Historical population
Year	Pop.	±% p.a.
1968	247	—
1975	272	+1.39%
1982	266	−0.32%
1990	222	−2.23%
1999	239	+0.82%
2007	209	−1.66%
2012	208	−0.10%
2017	203	−0.49%
2023	233	+2.32%
Source: INSEE

== See also ==
- Communes of the Charente department
