= Saint-Laurent-de-Cognac =

- Commune
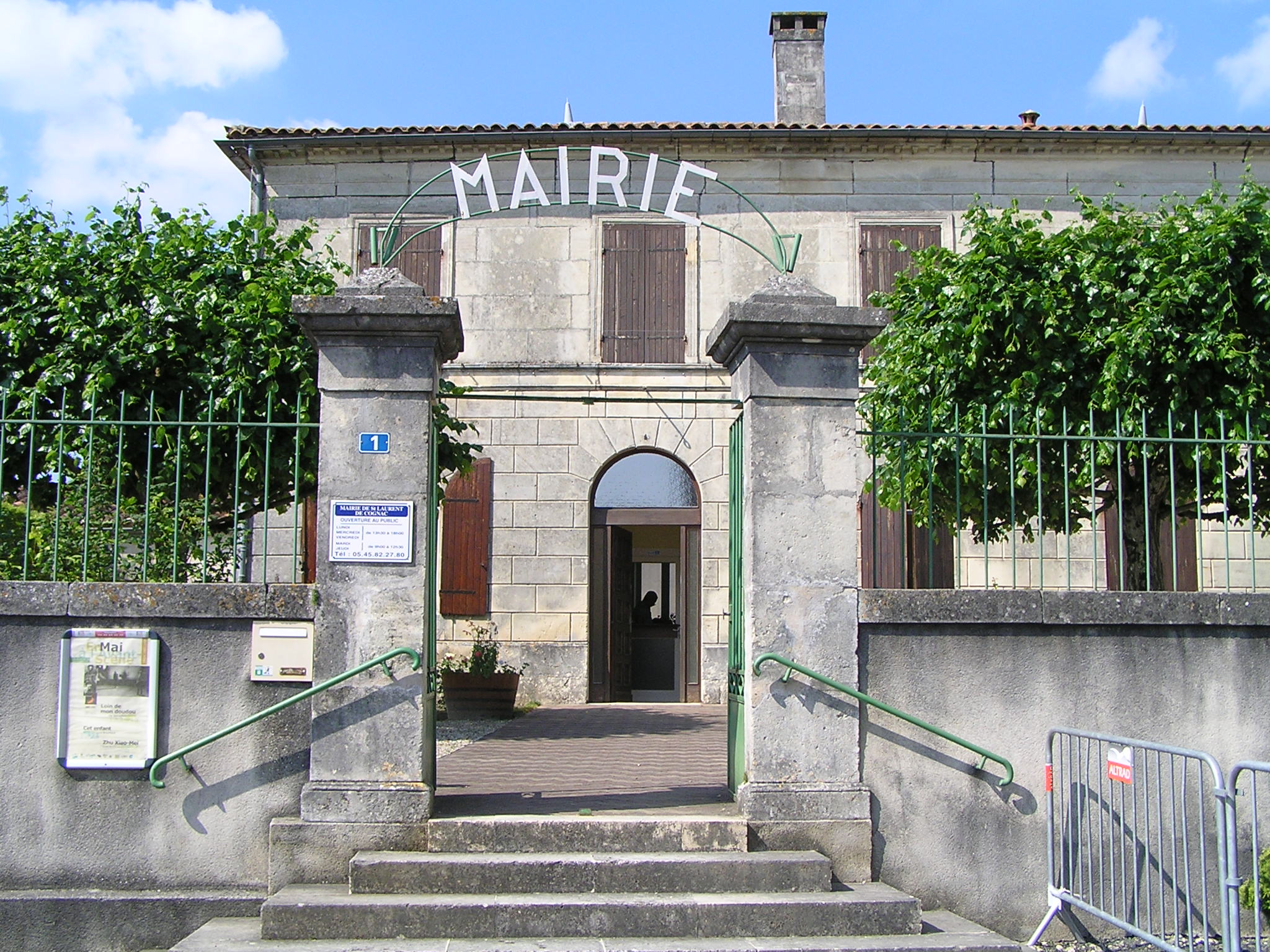
- Town hall
- Location of Saint-Laurent-de-Cognac
- Location within France Location within Nouvelle-Aquitaine
- Coordinates: 45°41′51″N 0°24′26″W
- Country: France
- Region: Nouvelle-Aquitaine
- Department: Charente
- Arrondissement: Cognac
- Canton: Cognac-2
- Intercommunality: CA Grand Cognac

Government
  - Mayor (2020–2026): Dominique Olivier Gravelle
- Area^{1}: 10.87 km^{2} (4.20 sq mi)
- Elevation: 71 m (233 ft)
- Highest elevation: 76 m (249 ft)
- Lowest elevation: 2 m (6.6 ft)
- Population (2023): 832
  - Density: 76.5/km^{2} (198/sq mi)
- Time zone: UTC+01:00 (CET)
  - Summer (DST): UTC+02:00 (CEST)
- INSEE/Postal code: 16330 /16100
- ^{1} French Land Register data, which excludes lakes, ponds, glaciers > 1 km^{2} (0.386 sq mi or 247 acres) and river estuaries.

Saint-Laurent-de-Cognac (French pronunciation: [sɛ̃ loʁɑ̃ də kɔɲak], literally Saint-Laurent of Cognac; Occitan: Sent Laurenç de Conhac) is a commune in the Charente department, southwestern France.

== Population ==
Historical population
Year	Pop.	±% p.a.
1968	670	—
1975	726	+1.15%
1982	804	+1.47%
1990	921	+1.71%
1999	923	+0.02%
2007	894	−0.40%
2012	880	−0.32%
2017	829	−1.19%
2023	832	+0.06%
Source: INSEE

== See also ==
- Communes of the Charente department
