= Ars, Charente =

Ars
- Commune
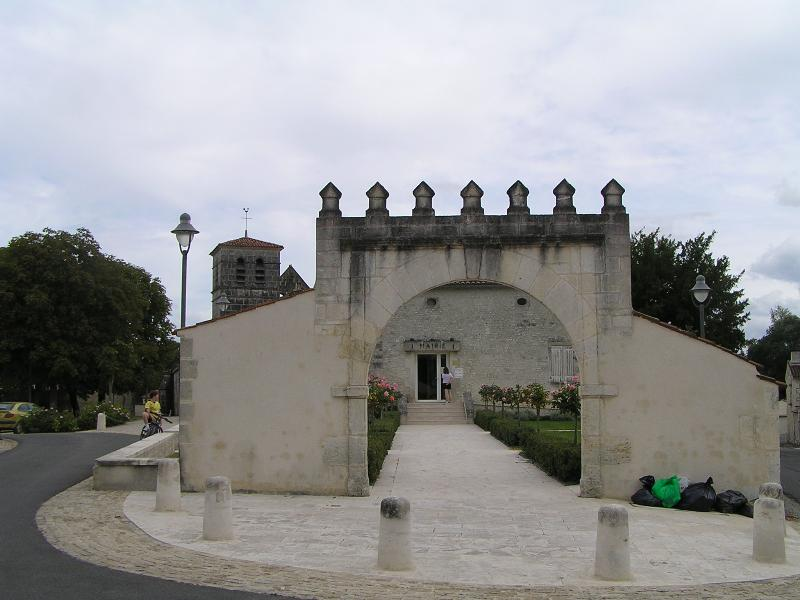
- Town hall
- Location of Ars
- Location within France Location within Nouvelle-Aquitaine
- Coordinates: 45°38′38″N 0°22′52″W
- Country: France
- Region: Nouvelle-Aquitaine
- Department: Charente
- Arrondissement: Cognac
- Canton: Cognac-2
- Intercommunality: CA Grand Cognac

Government
  - Mayor (2020–2026): Dominique Simon André Burtin
- Area^{1}: 11.40 km^{2} (4.40 sq mi)
- Elevation: 20 m (66 ft)
- Highest elevation: 58 m (190 ft)
- Lowest elevation: 5 m (16 ft)
- Population (2023): 686
  - Density: 60.2/km^{2} (156/sq mi)
- Time zone: UTC+01:00 (CET)
  - Summer (DST): UTC+02:00 (CEST)
- INSEE/Postal code: 16018 /16130
- ^{1} French Land Register data, which excludes lakes, ponds, glaciers > 1 km^{2} (0.386 sq mi or 247 acres) and river estuaries.

Ars is a commune in the Charente department in southwestern France.

== Population ==
Historical population
Year	Pop.	±% p.a.
1968	417	—
1975	482	+2.09%
1982	639	+4.11%
1990	750	+2.02%
1999	746	−0.06%
2007	724	−0.37%
2012	727	+0.08%
2017	723	−0.11%
2023	686	−0.87%
Source: INSEE

== See also ==
- Communes of the Charente department
