= Gimeux =

- Commune
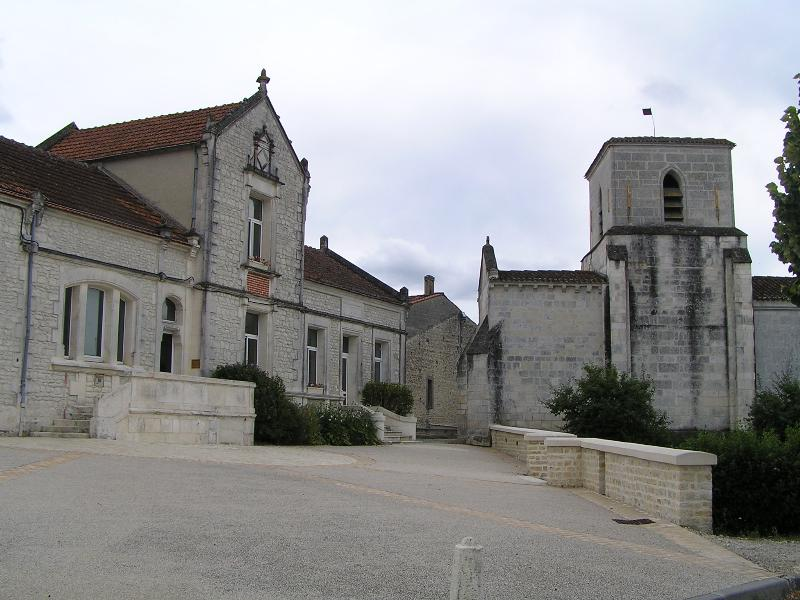
- The town hall and church in Gimeux
- Location of Gimeux
- Location within France Location within Nouvelle-Aquitaine
- Coordinates: 45°38′11″N 0°22′06″W
- Country: France
- Region: Nouvelle-Aquitaine
- Department: Charente
- Arrondissement: Cognac
- Canton: Cognac-2
- Intercommunality: CA Grand Cognac

Government
  - Mayor (2020–2026): Danièle Lambert-Daney
- Area^{1}: 7.40 km^{2} (2.86 sq mi)
- Elevation: 60 m (200 ft)
- Highest elevation: 61 m (200 ft)
- Lowest elevation: 6 m (20 ft)
- Population (2023): 742
  - Density: 100/km^{2} (260/sq mi)
- Time zone: UTC+01:00 (CET)
  - Summer (DST): UTC+02:00 (CEST)
- INSEE/Postal code: 16152 /16130
- ^{1} French Land Register data, which excludes lakes, ponds, glaciers > 1 km^{2} (0.386 sq mi or 247 acres) and river estuaries.

Gimeux (French pronunciation: [ʒimø]) is a commune in the Charente department in southwestern France.

== Population ==
Historical population
Year	Pop.	±% p.a.
1968	390	—
1975	465	+2.54%
1982	686	+5.71%
1990	751	+1.14%
1999	713	−0.58%
2007	716	+0.05%
2012	728	+0.33%
2017	716	−0.33%
2023	742	+0.60%
Source: INSEE

== See also ==
- Communes of the Charente department
