= Verrières, Charente =

Verrières
- Commune
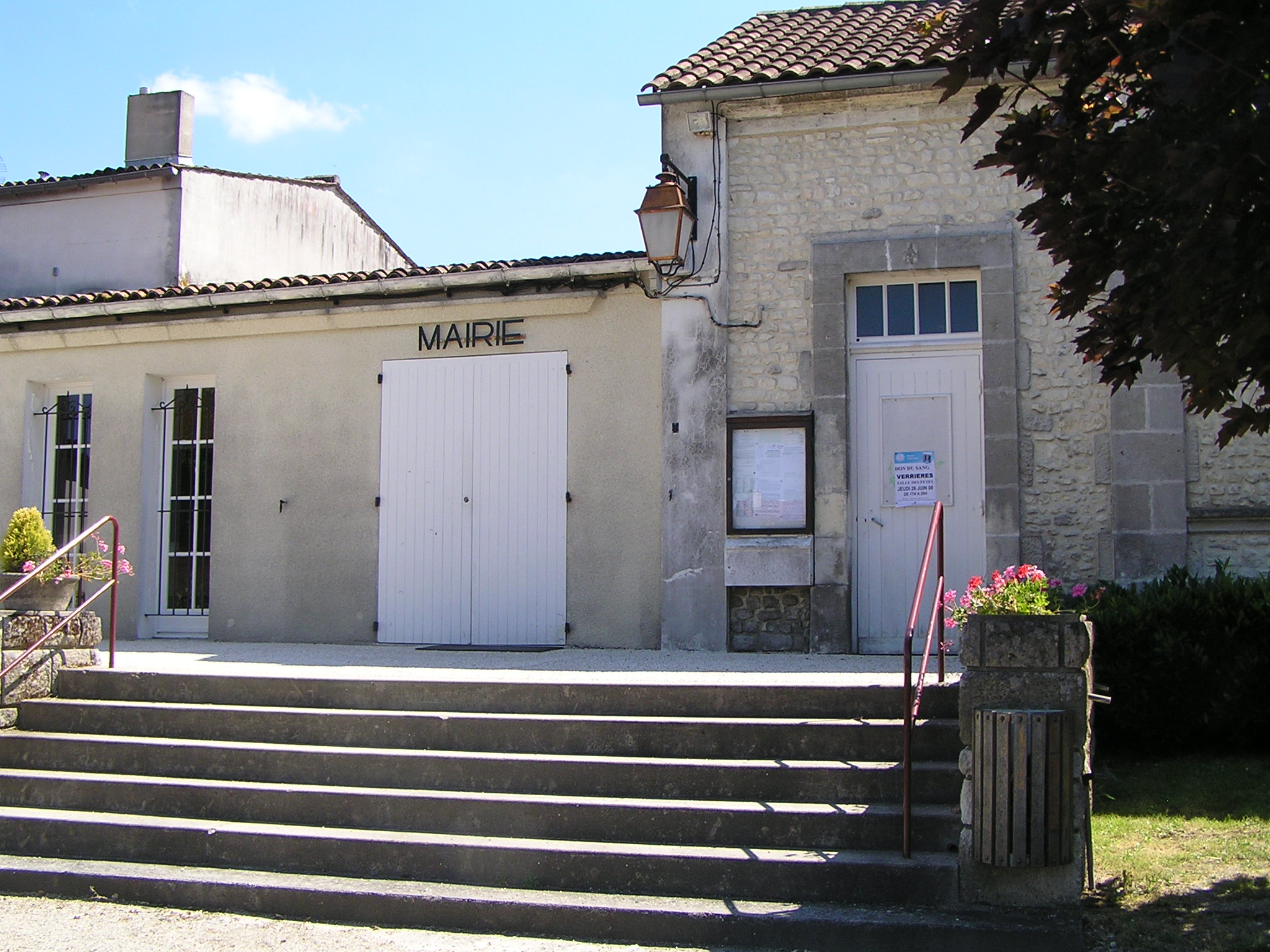
- Town hall
- Location of Verrières
- Location within France Location within Nouvelle-Aquitaine
- Coordinates: 45°34′19″N 0°15′55″W
- Country: France
- Region: Nouvelle-Aquitaine
- Department: Charente
- Arrondissement: Cognac
- Canton: Charente-Champagne
- Intercommunality: CA Grand Cognac

Government
  - Mayor (2020–2026): Marie-Pierre Rey-Boureau
- Area^{1}: 13.37 km^{2} (5.16 sq mi)
- Elevation: 75 m (246 ft)
- Highest elevation: 98 m (322 ft)
- Lowest elevation: 21 m (69 ft)
- Population (2023): 310
  - Density: 23/km^{2} (60/sq mi)
- Time zone: UTC+01:00 (CET)
  - Summer (DST): UTC+02:00 (CEST)
- INSEE/Postal code: 16399 /16130
- ^{1} French Land Register data, which excludes lakes, ponds, glaciers > 1 km^{2} (0.386 sq mi or 247 acres) and river estuaries.

Verrières (French pronunciation: [vɛʁjɛʁ]) is a commune in the Charente department in southwestern France.

== Population ==
Historical population
Year	Pop.	±% p.a.
1968	537	—
1975	474	−1.77%
1982	409	−2.08%
1990	406	−0.09%
1999	401	−0.14%
2007	370	−1.00%
2012	343	−1.50%
2017	352	+0.52%
2023	310	−2.10%
Source: INSEE

== See also ==
- Communes of the Charente department
