= Criteuil-la-Magdeleine =

- Commune
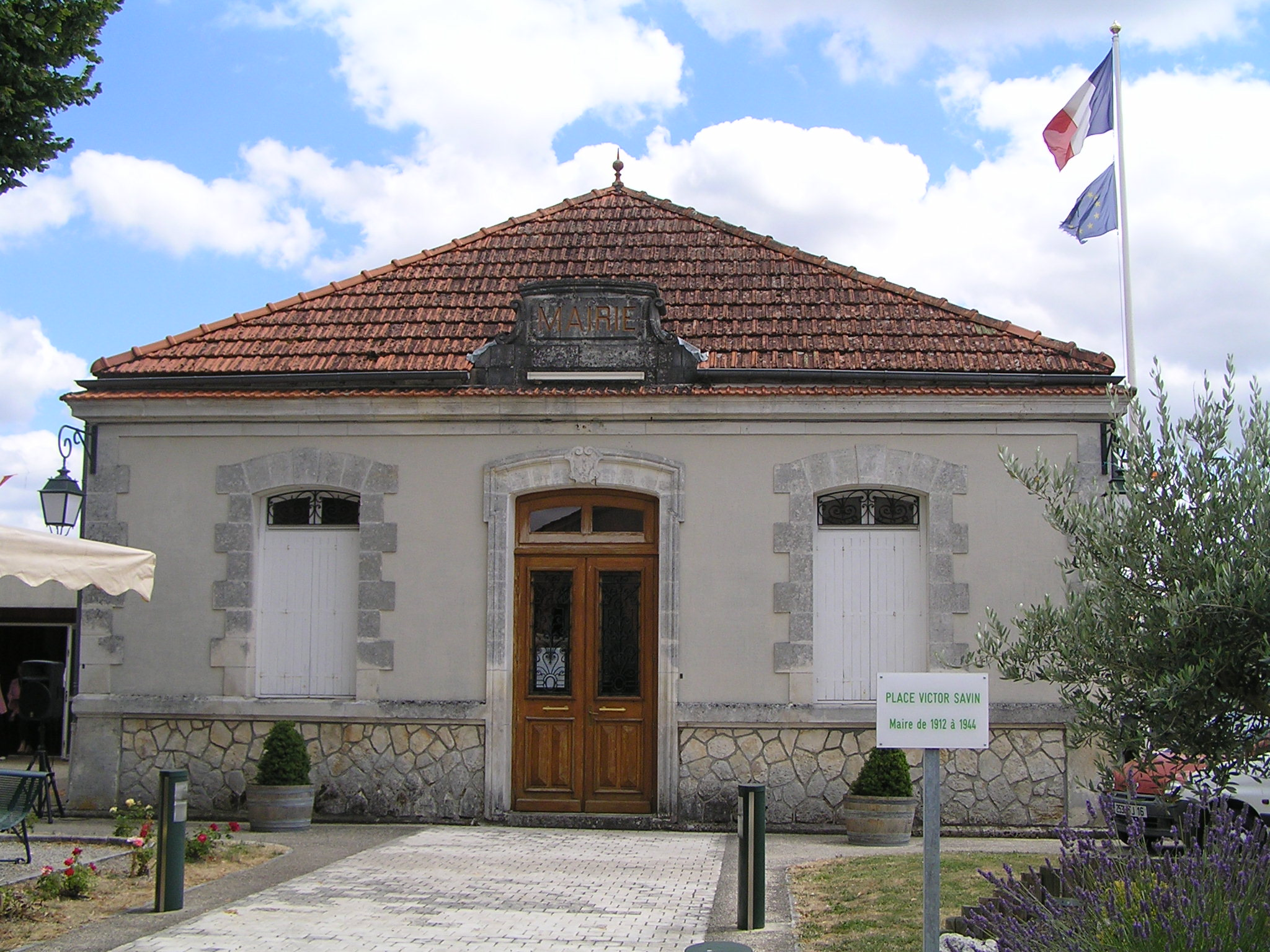
- Town hall

- Coat of arms
- Location of Criteuil-la-Magdeleine
- Location within France Location within Nouvelle-Aquitaine
- Coordinates: 45°32′15″N 0°12′54″W
- Country: France
- Region: Nouvelle-Aquitaine
- Department: Charente
- Arrondissement: Cognac
- Canton: Charente-Champagne
- Intercommunality: CA Grand Cognac

Government
  - Mayor (2020–2026): Michel Fougère
- Area^{1}: 15.19 km^{2} (5.86 sq mi)
- Elevation: 63 m (207 ft)
- Highest elevation: 89 m (292 ft)
- Lowest elevation: 25 m (82 ft)
- Population (2023): 405
  - Density: 26.7/km^{2} (69.1/sq mi)
- Time zone: UTC+01:00 (CET)
  - Summer (DST): UTC+02:00 (CEST)
- INSEE/Postal code: 16116 /16300
- ^{1} French Land Register data, which excludes lakes, ponds, glaciers > 1 km^{2} (0.386 sq mi or 247 acres) and river estuaries.

Criteuil-la-Magdeleine (French pronunciation: [kʁitœj la maɡdəlɛn]) is a commune in the Charente department in southwestern France.

== Population ==
Historical population
Year	Pop.	±% p.a.
1968	606	—
1975	600	−0.14%
1982	538	−1.55%
1990	506	−0.76%
1999	513	+0.15%
2007	435	−2.04%
2012	448	+0.59%
2017	404	−2.05%
2023	405	+0.04%
Source: INSEE

== See also ==
- Communes of the Charente department
