= Vibrac, Charente =

Vibrac
- Commune
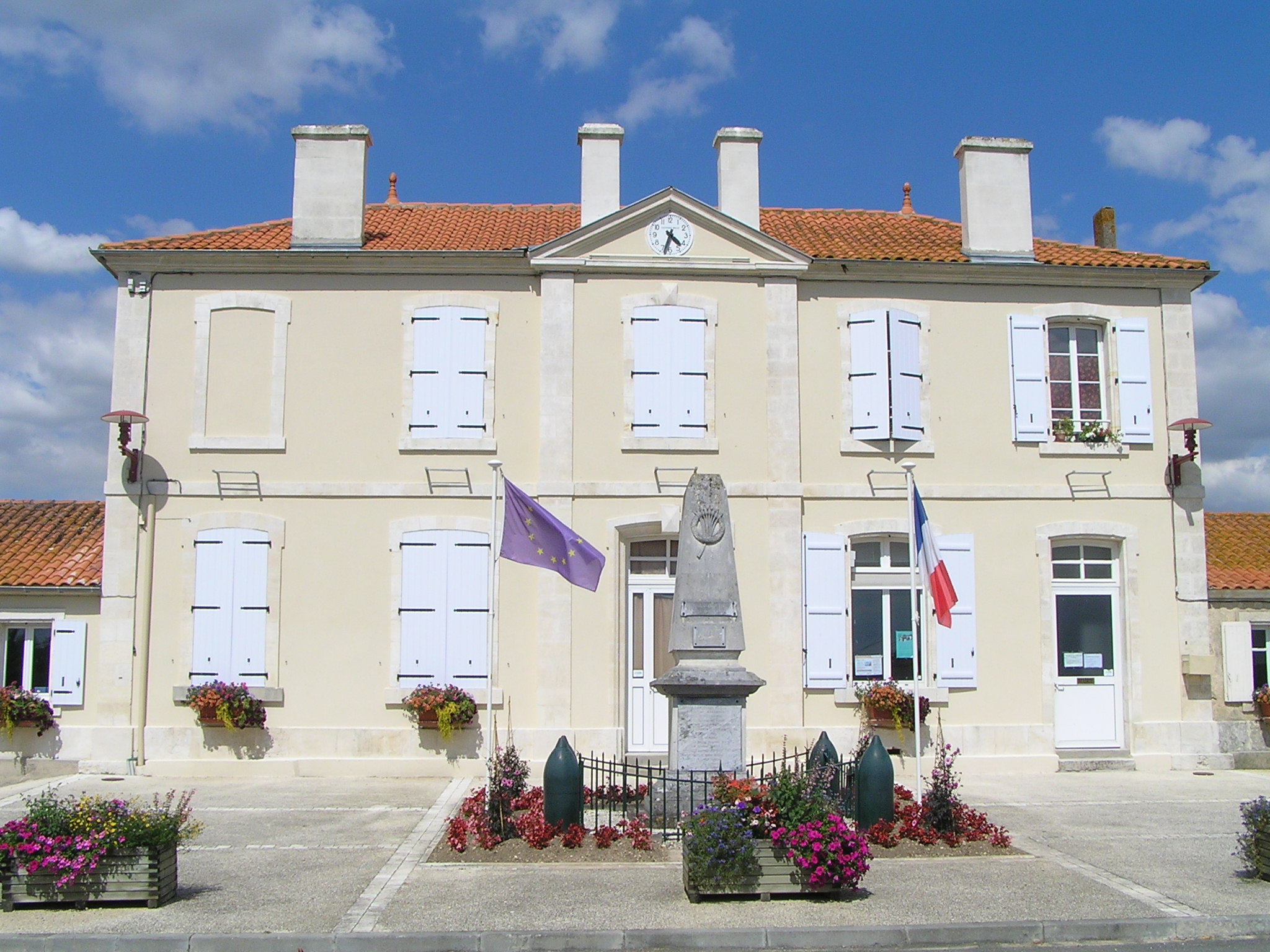
- Town hall
- Location of Vibrac
- Location within France Location within Nouvelle-Aquitaine
- Coordinates: 45°38′38″N 0°03′42″W
- Country: France
- Region: Nouvelle-Aquitaine
- Department: Charente
- Arrondissement: Cognac
- Canton: Charente-Champagne
- Intercommunality: CA Grand Cognac

Government
  - Mayor (2020–2026): Marie-Christine Grignon
- Area^{1}: 2.82 km^{2} (1.09 sq mi)
- Elevation: 45 m (148 ft)
- Highest elevation: 68 m (223 ft)
- Lowest elevation: 15 m (49 ft)
- Population (2023): 307
  - Density: 109/km^{2} (282/sq mi)
- Time zone: UTC+01:00 (CET)
  - Summer (DST): UTC+02:00 (CEST)
- INSEE/Postal code: 16402 /16120
- ^{1} French Land Register data, which excludes lakes, ponds, glaciers > 1 km^{2} (0.386 sq mi or 247 acres) and river estuaries.

Vibrac is a commune in the Charente department in southwestern France.

== Population ==
Historical population
Year	Pop.	±% p.a.
1968	246	—
1975	266	+1.12%
1982	232	−1.93%
1990	223	−0.49%
1999	244	+1.00%
2007	296	+2.44%
2012	306	+0.67%
2017	287	−1.27%
2023	307	+1.13%
Source: INSEE

== See also ==
- Communes of the Charente department
