= Bellevigne =

- Commune
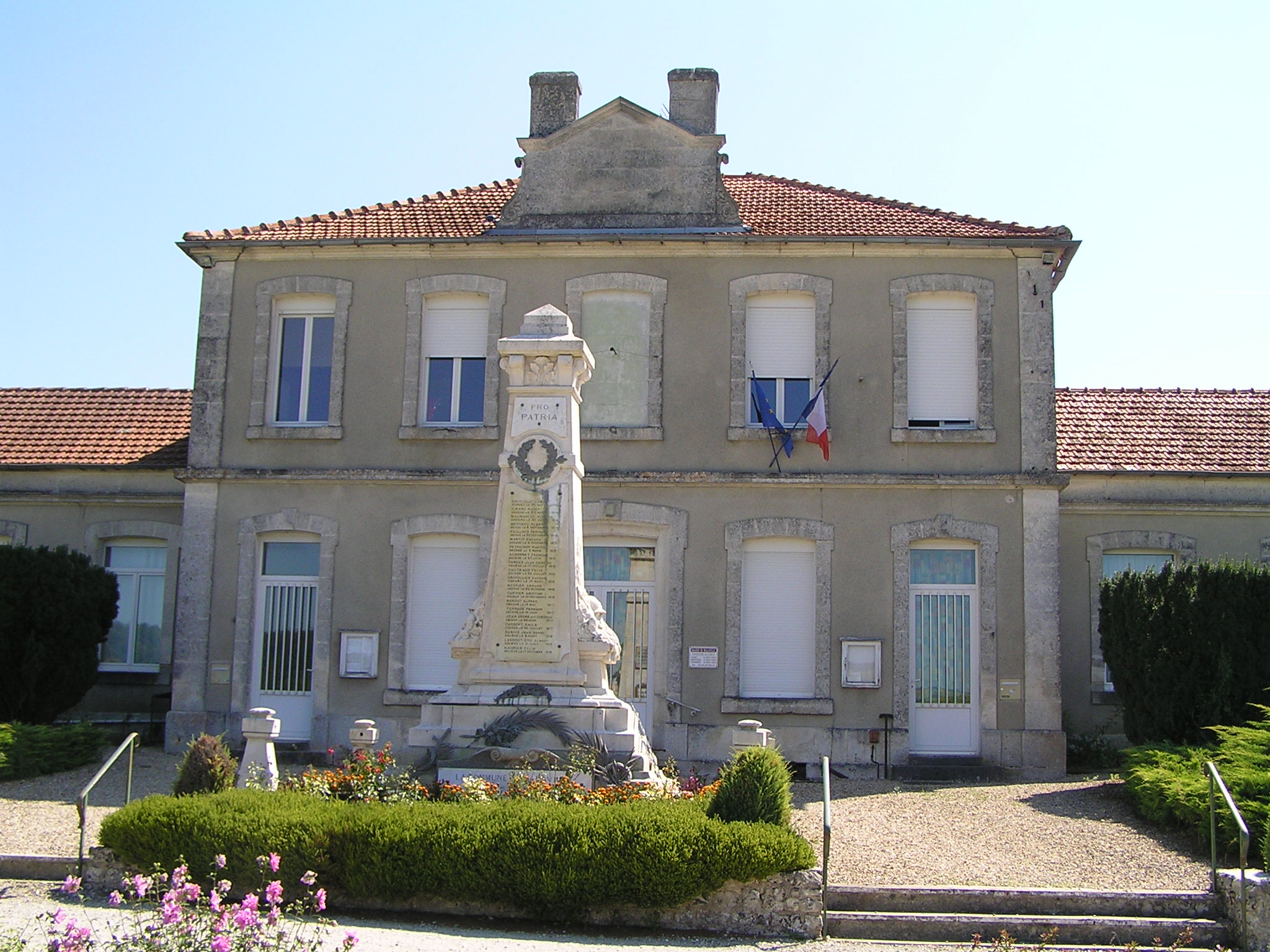
- The town hall in Bellevigne
- Location of Bellevigne
- Location within France Location within Nouvelle-Aquitaine
- Coordinates: 45°33′29″N 0°05′35″W
- Country: France
- Region: Nouvelle-Aquitaine
- Department: Charente
- Arrondissement: Cognac
- Canton: Charente-Champagne
- Intercommunality: CA Grand Cognac

Government
  - Mayor (2020–2026): Monique Martinot
- Area^{1}: 43.77 km^{2} (16.90 sq mi)
- Population (2023): 1,271
  - Density: 29.04/km^{2} (75.21/sq mi)
- Time zone: UTC+01:00 (CET)
  - Summer (DST): UTC+02:00 (CEST)
- INSEE/Postal code: 16204 /16120
- ^{1} French Land Register data, which excludes lakes, ponds, glaciers > 1 km^{2} (0.386 sq mi or 247 acres) and river estuaries.

Bellevigne (French pronunciation: [bɛlviɲ]) is a commune in the department of Charente, southwestern France. The municipality was established on 1 January 2017 by merger of the former communes of Malaville (the seat), Éraville, Nonaville, Touzac and Viville.

== See also ==
- Communes of the Charente department
