= Merpins =

- Commune
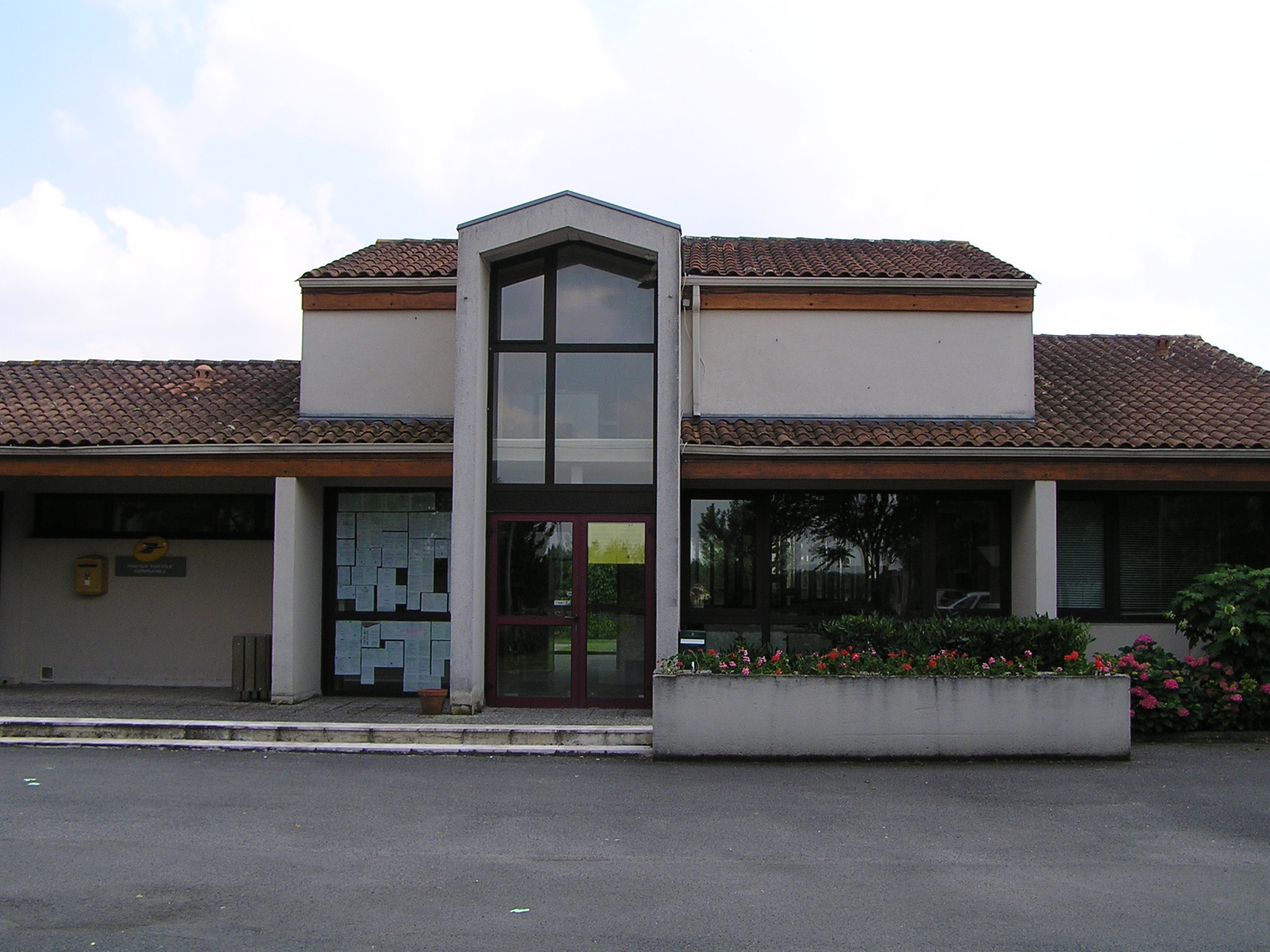
- Town hall
- Location of Merpins
- Location within France Location within Nouvelle-Aquitaine
- Coordinates: 45°40′27″N 0°21′55″W
- Country: France
- Region: Nouvelle-Aquitaine
- Department: Charente
- Arrondissement: Cognac
- Canton: Cognac-2
- Intercommunality: CA Grand Cognac

Government
  - Mayor (2023–2026): Hubert Demenier
- Area^{1}: 10.46 km^{2} (4.04 sq mi)
- Elevation: 10 m (33 ft)
- Highest elevation: 33 m (108 ft)
- Lowest elevation: 2 m (6.6 ft)
- Population (2023): 1,085
  - Density: 103.7/km^{2} (268.7/sq mi)
- Time zone: UTC+01:00 (CET)
  - Summer (DST): UTC+02:00 (CEST)
- INSEE/Postal code: 16217 /16100
- ^{1} French Land Register data, which excludes lakes, ponds, glaciers > 1 km^{2} (0.386 sq mi or 247 acres) and river estuaries.

Merpins (French pronunciation: [mɛʁpɛ̃]) is a commune in the Charente department in southwestern France.

== Population ==
Historical population
Year	Pop.	±% p.a.
1968	832	—
1975	895	+1.05%
1982	953	+0.90%
1990	1,025	+0.91%
1999	940	−0.96%
2007	1,039	+1.26%
2012	1,000	−0.76%
2017	1,104	+2.00%
2023	1,085	−0.29%
Source: INSEE

== See also ==
- Communes of the Charente department
