= Canton of Cognac-2 =

Coordinates: 45.69°N 0.33°W

- Canton
- Situation of the canton of Cognac-2 in the department of Charente
- Country: France
- Region: Nouvelle-Aquitaine
- Department: Charente
- No. of communes: {{{nbcomm}}}
- Population (2023): 17,630
- INSEE code: 1612

The canton of Cognac-2 is an administrative division of the Charente department in southwestern France. It was created during the French canton reorganisation, which took effect in March 2015. Its seat is in Cognac.

It consists of the following communes:

1. Ars
2. Châteaubernard
3. Cognac (partly)
4. Gimeux
5. Javrezac
6. Merpins
7. Saint-Laurent-de-Cognac
