= Canton of Charente-Champagne =

Coordinates: 45.60°N 0.05°W

- Canton
- Situation of the canton of Charente-Champagne in the department of Charente
- Country: France
- Region: Nouvelle-Aquitaine
- Department: Charente
- No. of communes: {{{nbcomm}}}
- Population (2023): 16,748
- INSEE code: 1607

The canton of Charente-Champagne is an administrative division of the Charente department, southwestern France. It was created at the French canton reorganisation which came into effect in March 2015. Its seat is in Châteauneuf-sur-Charente.

It consists of the following communes:

1. Angeac-Champagne
2. Angeac-Charente
3. Bellevigne
4. Birac
5. Bonneuil
6. Bouteville
7. Châteauneuf-sur-Charente
8. Criteuil-la-Magdeleine
9. Gensac-la-Pallue
10. Genté
11. Graves-Saint-Amant
12. Juillac-le-Coq
13. Lignières-Ambleville
14. Mosnac-Saint-Simeux
15. Saint-Fort-sur-le-Né
16. Saint-Preuil
17. Saint-Simon
18. Salles-d'Angles
19. Segonzac
20. Verrières
21. Vibrac
