= Arthenac =

- Commune
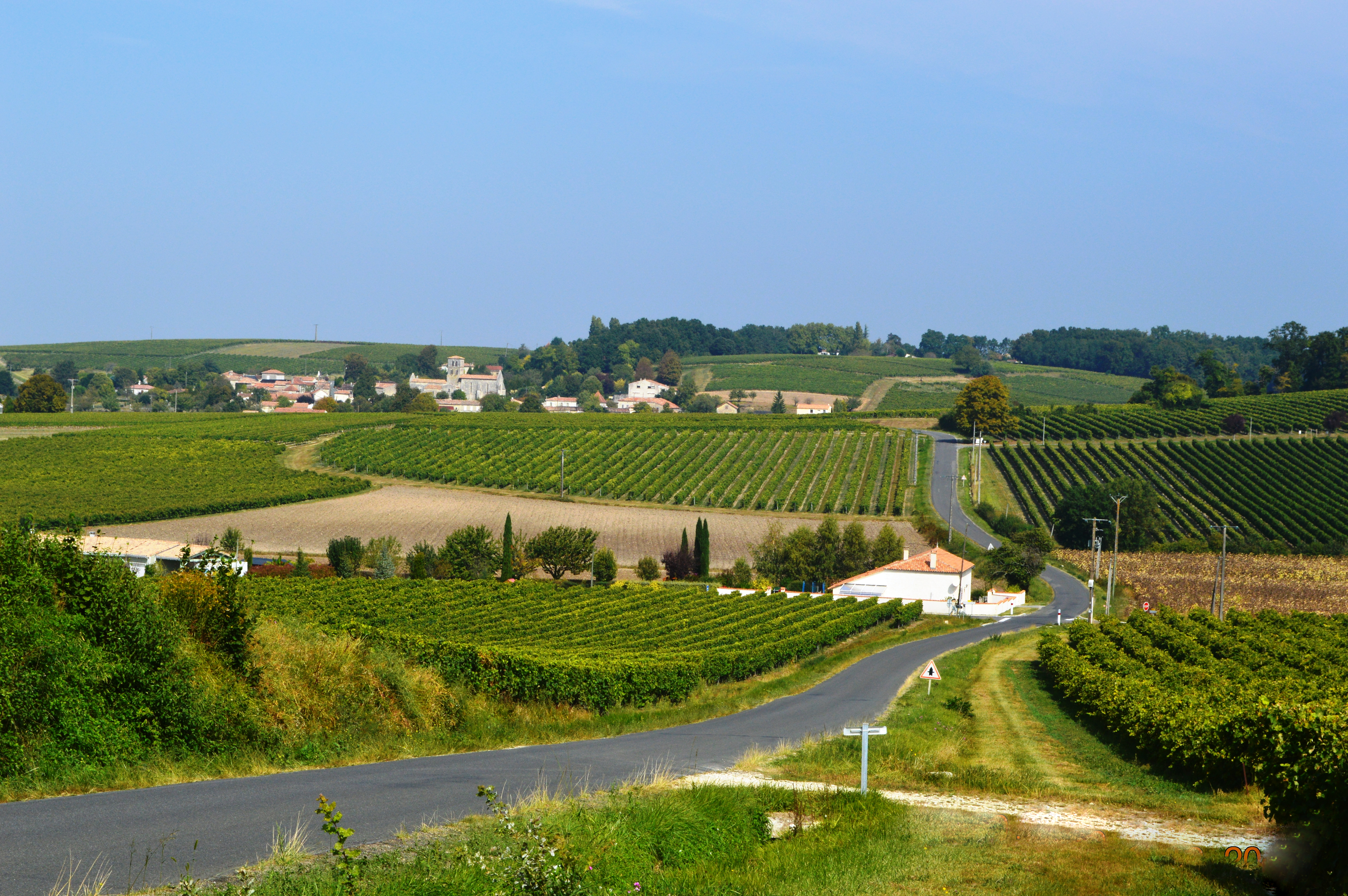
- A general view of Arthenac
- Location of Arthenac
- Location within France Location within Nouvelle-Aquitaine
- Coordinates: 45°30′57″N 0°18′48″W
- Country: France
- Region: Nouvelle-Aquitaine
- Department: Charente-Maritime
- Arrondissement: Jonzac
- Canton: Jonzac
- Intercommunality: CC Haute Saintonge

Government
  - Mayor (2020–2026): Bruno Chainier
- Area^{1}: 12.66 km^{2} (4.89 sq mi)
- Elevation: 72 m (236 ft)
- Highest elevation: 111 m (364 ft)
- Lowest elevation: 43 m (141 ft)
- Population (2023): 334
  - Density: 26.4/km^{2} (68.3/sq mi)
- Time zone: UTC+01:00 (CET)
  - Summer (DST): UTC+02:00 (CEST)
- INSEE/Postal code: 17020 /17520
- ^{1} French Land Register data, which excludes lakes, ponds, glaciers > 1 km^{2} (0.386 sq mi or 247 acres) and river estuaries.

Arthenac (French pronunciation: [aʁtənak]) is a commune in the Charente-Maritime department in the Nouvelle-Aquitaine region of south-western France.

The commune has been awarded three flowers by the National Council of Towns and Villages in Bloom in the Competition of cities and villages in Bloom.

== Geography ==
Arthenac is located in the south of Charente-Maritime in the former province of Saintonge some 24 km south-east of Pons, 16 km north-east of Jonzac, and immediately south-west of Archiac. Access to the commune is by the D699 road from Archiac in the north-west passing through the village and continuing south-west to Réaux. There is also the D251 road from Sainte-Lheurine in the north-west passing through south of the village to Saint-Eugène in the south-east. The D149 comes from the D700 in the north passing through the village then south to Allas-Champagne. The commune is mostly farmland with two large forests south of the village.

== History ==
Under the Ancien Régime Arthenac was independent but was merged with Archiac in 1789. The commune regained its independent status on 13 October 1831.

== Administration ==
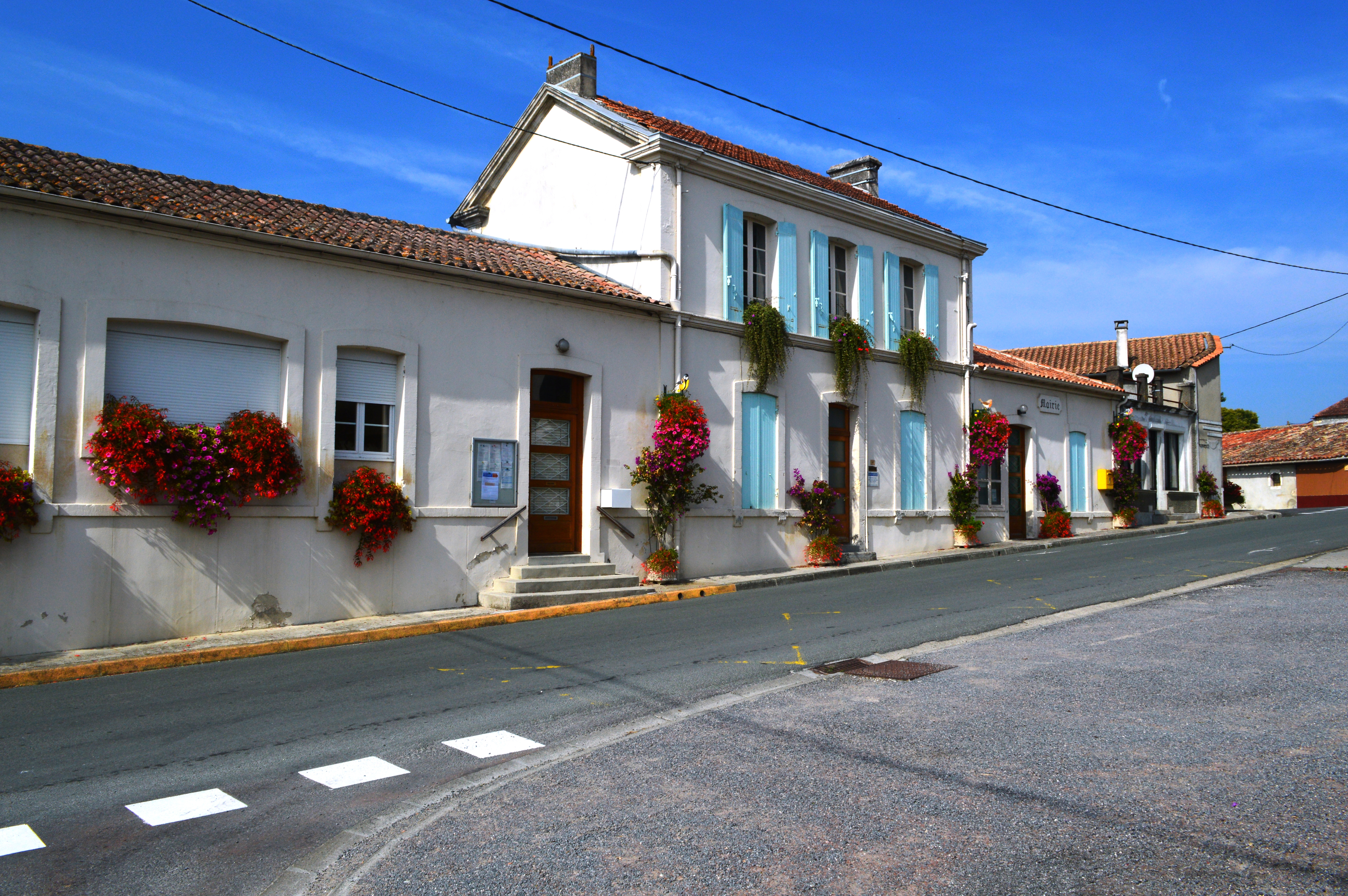
The Town Hall

List of Successive Mayors

From	To	Name	Party
2001	2020	Chantal Guimberteau	DVD
2020	2026	Bruno Chainier	

== Demography ==
The inhabitants of the commune are known as Arthenacais or Arthenacaises in French.

Historical population

Year	Pop.	±% p.a.
1831	779	—
1846	731	−0.42%
1872	618	−0.64%
1901	503	−0.71%
1926	459	−0.37%
1946	410	−0.56%
1962	407	−0.05%
1968	398	−0.37%

Year	Pop.	±% p.a.
1975	351	−1.78%
1982	305	−1.99%
1990	331	+1.03%
1999	312	−0.65%
2007	323	+0.43%
2012	337	+0.85%
2017	345	+0.47%
2023	334	−0.54%

Source: EHESS and INSEE

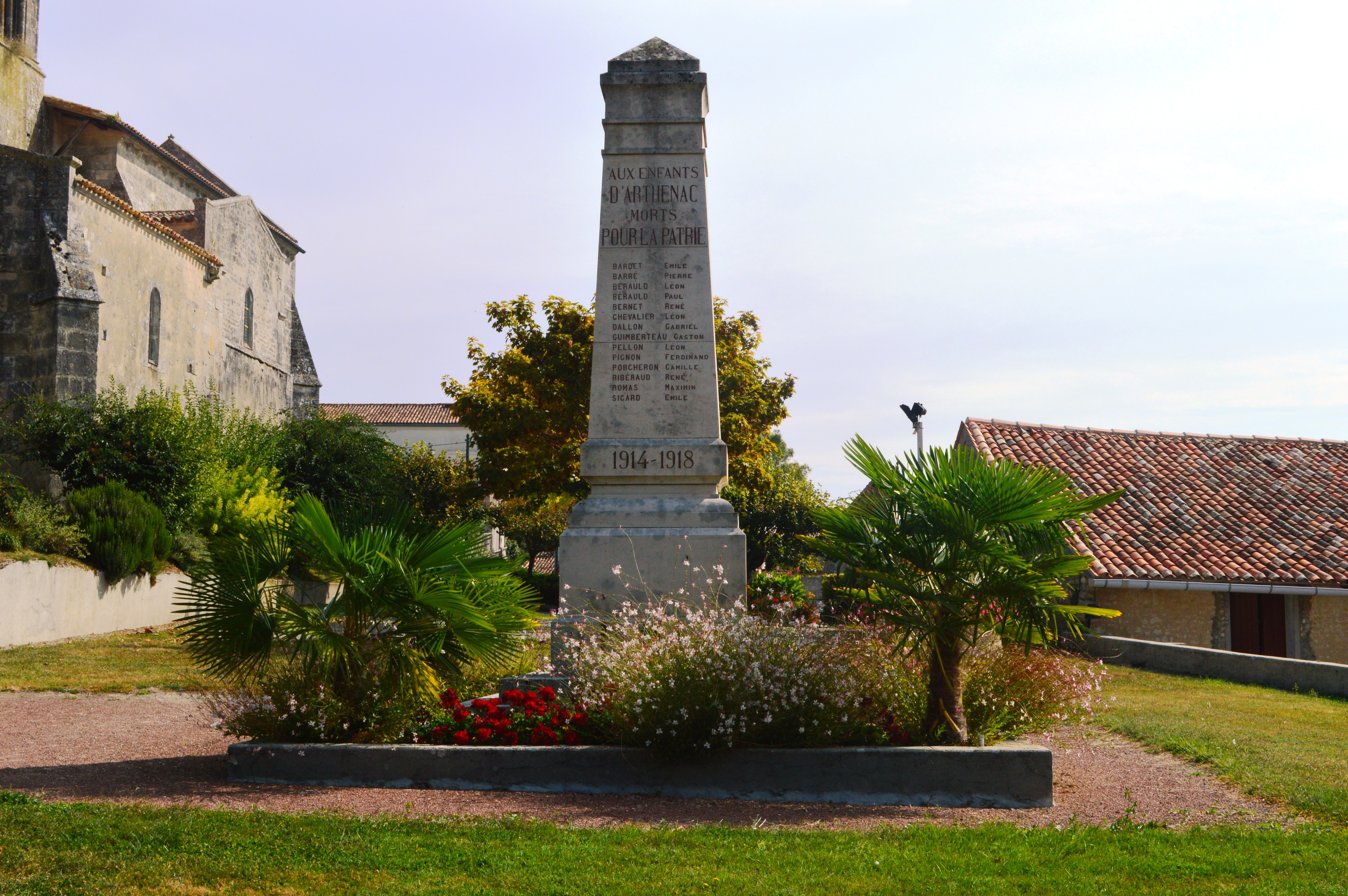
Arthenac War Memorial

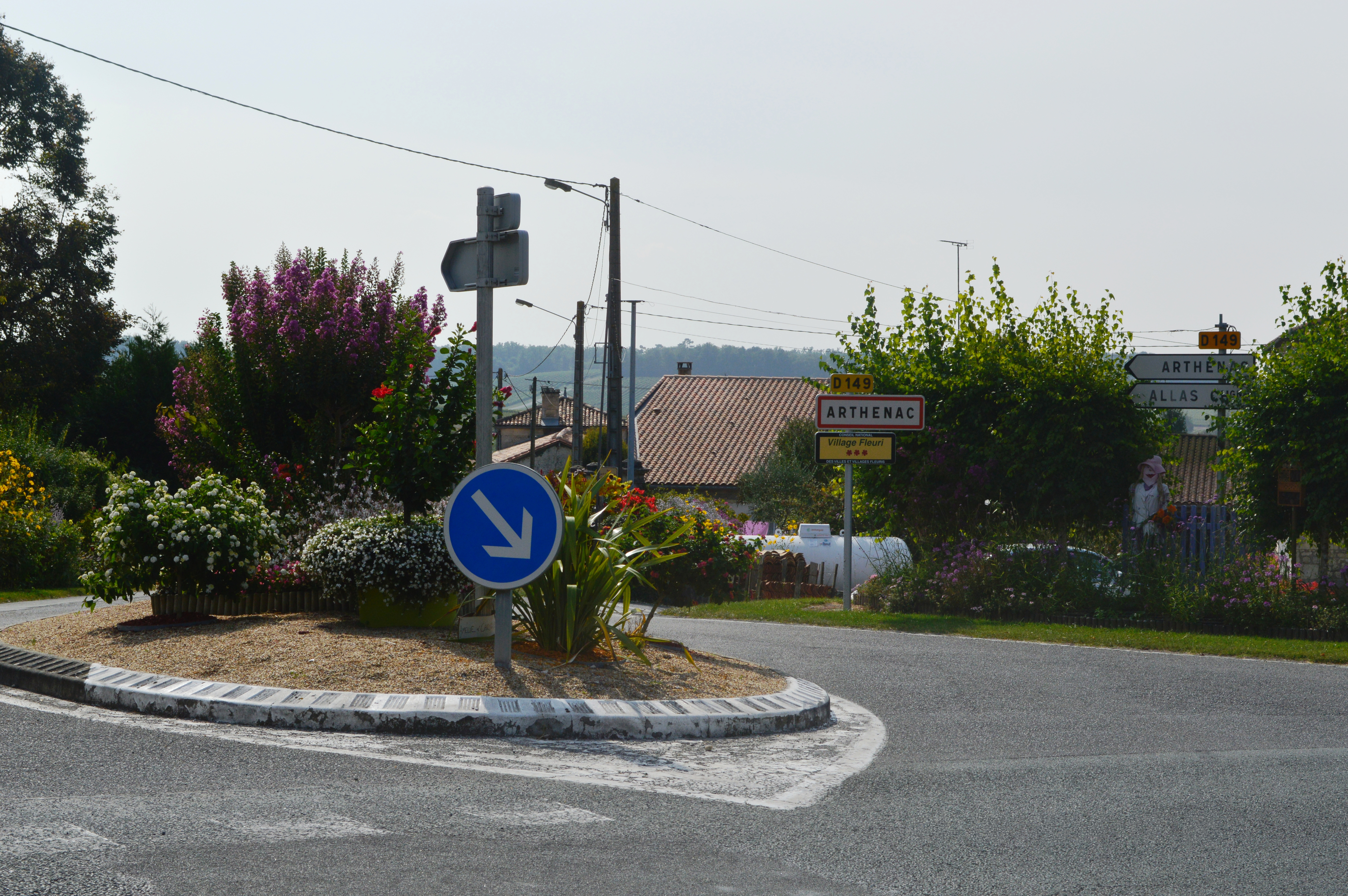
The entry to Arthenac

== Sites and monuments ==
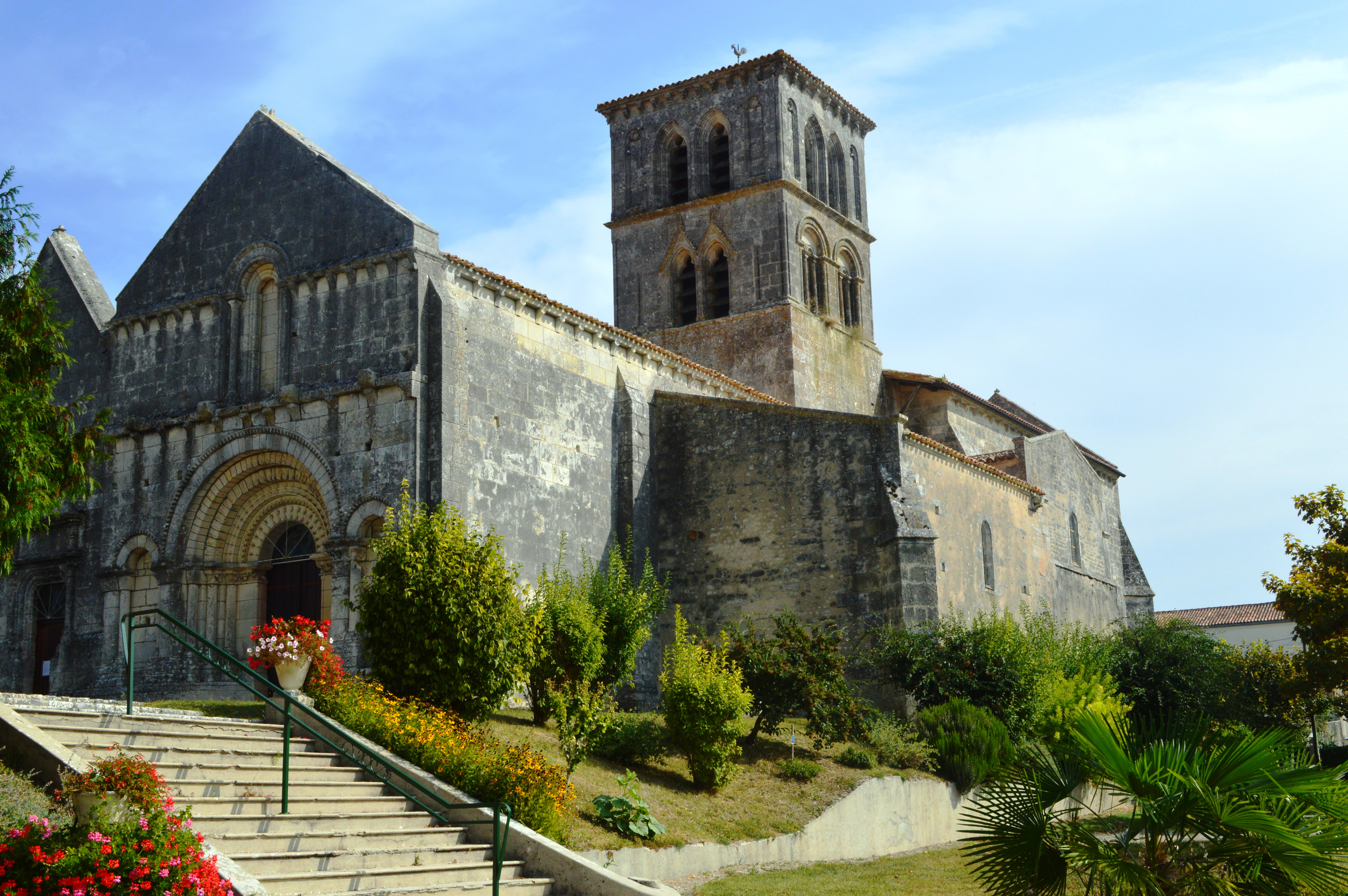
The Church of Saint Martin

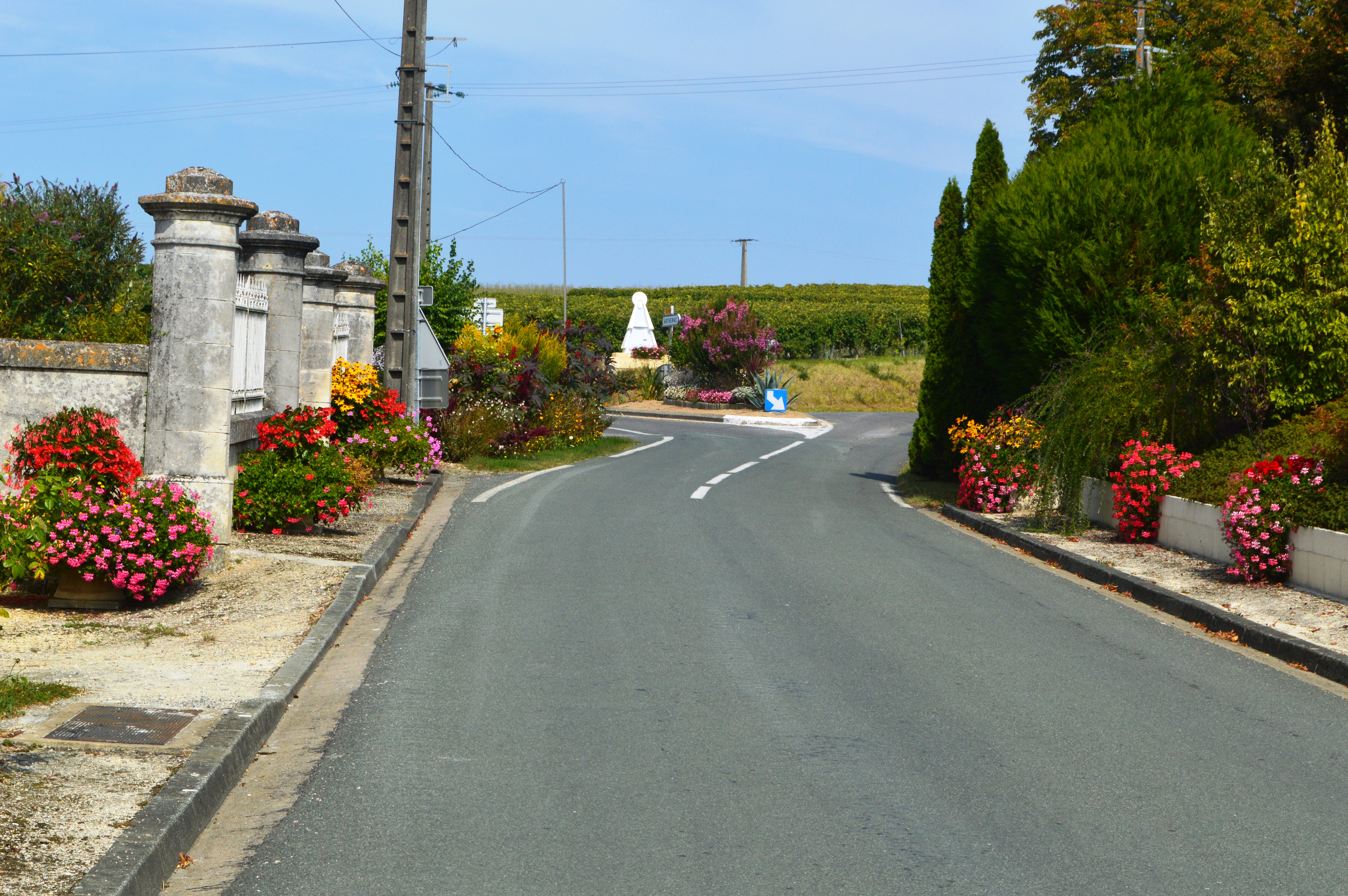
A street in Arthenac

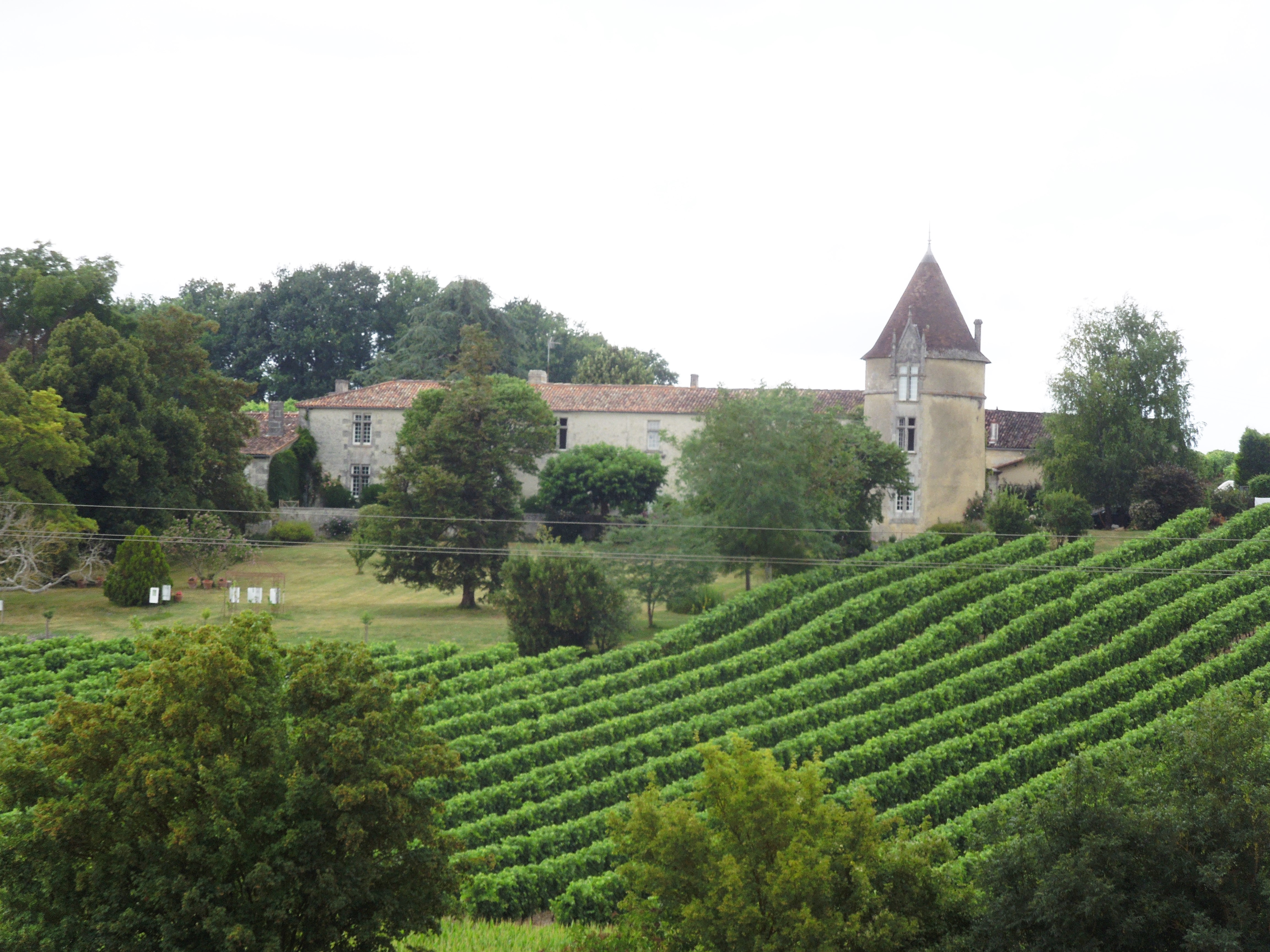
Domaine de Pimbert

- The Church of Saint Martin (12th century) at Arthenac has had its central window restored. It is registered as a historical monument.

== See also ==
- Communes of the Charente-Maritime department
