= Ambleville =

Ambleville may refer to:

- Ambleville, Charente, a former commune of the department of Charente in France
- Ambleville, Val-d'Oise, a commune of the department of Val-d'Oise in France
