= Ambleville, Charente =

Ambleville
- Part of Lignières-Ambleville
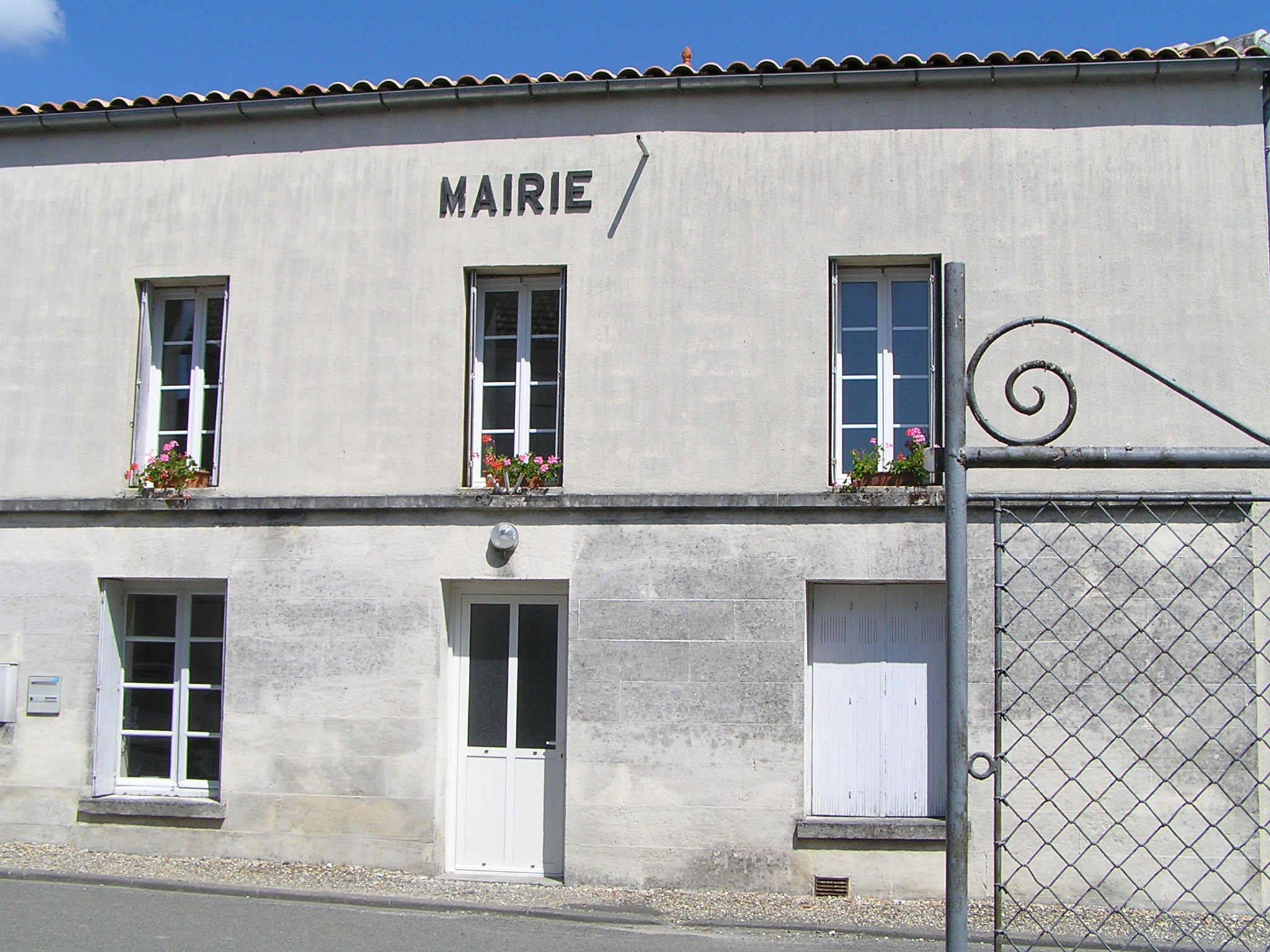
- The town hall in Ambleville

- Coat of arms
- Location of Ambleville
- Location within France Location within Nouvelle-Aquitaine
- Coordinates: 45°33′32″N 0°13′16″W
- Country: France
- Region: Nouvelle-Aquitaine
- Department: Charente
- Arrondissement: Cognac
- Canton: Charente-Champagne
- Commune: Lignières-Ambleville
- Area^{1}: 5.09 km^{2} (1.97 sq mi)
- Elevation: 88 m (289 ft)
- Highest elevation: 94 m (308 ft)
- Lowest elevation: 34 m (112 ft)
- Population (2022): 159
  - Density: 31.2/km^{2} (80.9/sq mi)
- Time zone: UTC+01:00 (CET)
  - Summer (DST): UTC+02:00 (CEST)
- Postal code: 16300
- ^{1} French Land Register data, which excludes lakes, ponds, glaciers > 1 km^{2} (0.386 sq mi or 247 acres) and river estuaries.

Ambleville (French pronunciation: [ɑ̃bləvil]) is a former commune in the Charente department in the Nouvelle-Aquitaine region of southwestern France. On 1 January 2022, it was merged into the new commune of Lignières-Ambleville.

== Geography ==
=== Location and access ===
Ambleville is a commune in the west of the department of Charente located 7 km south of Segonzac, 18 km southeast of Cognac, and 31 km west of Angoulême.

The area of the commune of Ambleville is about 500 hectares.

The village of Ambleville is also 7 km east of Archiac, 10 km north of Barbezieux-Saint-Hilaire and 14 km west of Chateauneuf-sur-Charente.

The main route to the commune is the D699 road from Angoulême to Archiac, Pons, and Jonzac via Châteauneuf. This former national road was part of the road from Limoges in Haute-Vienne to Mirambeau in Charente-Maritime. The D44 road goes northwest towards Cognac via Saint-Fort-sur-le-Né and goes south towards Barbezieux.

The nearest railway stations are Chateauneuf-sur-Charente (in the direction of Angoulême) and Jarnac Charente (in the direction of Saintes and Royan) both located 14 km from the town. The Jonzac station is 21 km from the town and has services to Bordeaux Saint-Jean in one direction as well as La Rochelle and Nantes in the other direction.

=== Hamlets and localities ===
The population is distributed in twenty hamlets or "villages" - the term used in Saintonge and the South-West of France.

The town has a few houses grouped around the church.

The two major population centres are: le Château and la Motte both near the village near the road to Chateauneuf. The town hall is located at le Château.

La Voûte is the highest point in the commune in the north with other hamlets of Chez Philbert and La Bertillère in the south of the commune, le Guineuf on the Collinaud stream etc.

=== Geology and terrain ===
The commune is made up of Campanian (Upper Cretaceous) chalk limestone, which covers a large part of the South Charente. The valleys are covered by alluvium from the recent Quaternary period.

The communal land has a quite hilly relief which rises gradually to reach, at its northern end near the hamlet of la Voûte, a height 95 m. The small Collinaud valley in the south of the commune is located where the town and the main road are. The lowest point is 34 m at the western edge of the commune along the Collinaud. The town is located at the tip of a small promontory in the valley and is 40 m above sea level.

=== Hydrography ===
The town is bounded on the south by the Collinaud stream which flows from the town of Bonneuil. It is a tributary of the Né and a sub-tributary of the Charente.

Two small intermittent streams descend from both sides of the Castle to join the Collinaud near the village. Further west the Font Moreau rises while further east les Boulots flows down from Sonneville.

=== Climate ===
As for three-quarters of the department in the south and west, the climate is oceanic Aquitaine.

== Toponymy ==
In the absence of old spellings, we can relate Ambleville to the homonymous commune of Ambleville in Val-d'Oise, attested in the Latinized form of Amblenvilla in 1209.

The name has a medieval source in -ville which is a toponymic suffix meaning "rural area" or "village", from the Gallo-Roman villa meaning "rural area", itself derived from the Latin villa rustica. The first part is, as is usually the case, a Germanic personal name. It can be Ambla - a woman's name, or Amblinus - a man's name, or alternatively Amelinus. These anthroponyms are well represented in northern France (see Amblainville, Ablancourt, Amblimont, etc.). The radical amal- is found in the names Amélie and Amaury.

La Motte is a medieval place name meaning "butte" or "mound of earth", attested in medieval Latin in the form motta in 836, for a term of pre-Latin origin *mutt(a). This term also meant once a stately home or castle.

== History ==
The commune has been occupied since ancient times as proto-historic ditches have been found: circular at Moulin du Guineuf and oval at a place called le Guineuf - a rounded shape that may be a tumulus which has been leveled - near the Ambleville church to the east. In the west of the commune fragments of Iron Age vases have been found.

The land of Ambleville was most important and very old, extending over five parishes. Ramnulphe d'Ambleville lived there in 1239 and Arnaud d'Ambleville was quoted in a judgment of 1311. An Ambleville lord was a herald for Joan of Arc. The lands of Ambleville then passed into the Archiac family. the Marquise of Archiac left a daughter, Jacquette, who married Pierre Jourdain and transmitted to him the ownership of Ambleville.

In 1548 during the salt tax revolt, François Jourdain was Baron of Ambleville. Wanting to stand up to sedition he only succeeded in rousing the people against him and was forced to flee. The insurgents seized the Ambleville castle, set it on fire, and reduced it to ashes.

The Jordan family was succeeded by the Jussac family, the best known of whom was François de Jussac, who became captain of fifty men at arms under the orders of the king, then Governor of Cognac and lieutenant-general of Angoumois and Saintonge. In 1621 he lent his support to the Duke of Épernon to raise a body of troops to besiege the city of La Rochelle.

Towards 1643, the Jussac family sold Ambleville to Henri d'Albret, Squire of Pons and Count of Miossens who, a few years later, assigned this land to his third son, François Amanieu who was better known as the Chevalier d'Albret. The latter never married and was killed in a duel by Mr. Saint-Léger Corbon and Ambleville passed to the house of Pons represented by Charles Amanieu the Marquis d'Albret who was his nephew. He shot himself on 5 August 1678 and his widow remarried to Charles, Viscount of Marsan who was the youngest son of the Count of Harcourt. She left all her property to her second husband whose second wife was Thérèse de Goyon-Matignon. Several children were born of this union including Jacques-Henri de Lorraine-Lixin who received a share of the land of Ambleville. He was a General who was killed on 2 June 1734 at the Siege of Philippsbourg in Germany.

Ambleville was then sold to Mr. de Monconseil, a Lieutenant-General whose daughter Cécile married Jean-Frédéric de la Tour du Pin-Gouvernet, Colonel of the Grenadiers of France. The marriage contract was signed by the royal family. Appointed the Member for Saintonge in the States General in 1789, he wholeheartedly accepted the Revolution and was appointed Minister of War on 4 August 1789. During the Terror he was accused of moderation, then arrested, sentenced to death, and executed on 28 April 1794. Under Louis XVIII his son became a peer of France and Ambassador in Turin.

During the Revolution, the rich lordship of Ambleville was completely dismantled. The new authorities did not want Ambleville to retain its political and economic hegemony over the region. It was therefore decided that it would be the smallest commune in the area, keeping only the core of the ancient lordship.

A Tree of Liberty - a lime tree - was planted along the Archiac road towards the village of La Motte. It was cut down in the 1980s.

The commune of Ambleville was provided with a notarial study located in the village of Guineuf. This study was transferred to Segonzac in 1924 after the death in 1919 of the last notary, Alcide Renaud.

=== Heraldry ===
Arms of Ambleville	The commune chose as their arms those of the last family who owned the Ambleville manor. This is the arms of the La Tour du Pin family, from Dauphiné. Blazon: Quarterly, first and fourth Azure, a tower Argent port the same embattled of 7 pieces and masoned in sable, in chief gules charged with three helmets in profile visor open of Or; second and third Or, a dolphin azure crested, barbed, finned, and eared of gules.

== Administration ==
List of Successive Mayors of Ambleville

Mayors from the French Revolution to 1942

From	To	Name
1793	1800	Pierre Courret
1800	1813	Antoine Boujut
1813	1825	Pierre Pissot
1825	1831	Pierre-Silas Servant
1831	1834	Pierre Couprie
1834	1843	Pierre Pissot Frère
1843	1848	Pierre Jannet
1848	1855	Pierre Dumontet
1855	1871	Alexandre Filhon
1871	1879	Pierre Couprie
1879	1889	Élie Laroche
1889	1925	Léonce Servant
1925	1942	Paul Couprie

Mayors from 1942

From	To	Name	Party	Position
1942	1971	Raoul Dupuy		
1971	1977	Michel Gignac		
1977	1978	Paul Sabourin	PRV	Lawyer - La Voûte
1978	1983	André Fort	ind.	Farmer - La Voûte
1983	1989	Guy Ménard	ind.	Farmer - La Voûte
1989	1995	Michel Couprie	ind.	Farmer - La Roumade
1995	2014	Noëlle Le Golvan	ind.	Public Hospital Worker
2014	2020	Jean Graveraud		
2020	2021	Laurence Le Faou		

The commune of Ambleville was part of the Canton of Lignières then since 1801 that of Segonzac and of the district then the arrondissement of Cognac.

In 1995 the commune joined the Community of Communes of the Grande Champagne with 11 other communes in the Canton de Segonzac.

In 2011 the municipal budget voted on 4 April 2011 set the local tax rate at 7.46% for the housing tax, 18.80% for housing tax and 45.07% for property tax on buildings. The unified business tax (TPU) was set at the rate of 15.24% as seen in all other communes in the Community of communes of Grande Champagne which is then distributed throughout the territory.

== Population ==
The inhabitants of the commune are known as Amblevillois or Amblevilloises in French.

Historical population
Year	Pop.	±% p.a.
1968	332	—
1975	286	−2.11%
1982	234	−2.83%
1990	215	−1.05%
1999	217	+0.10%
2007	207	−0.59%
2012	183	−2.43%
2017	180	−0.33%
2022	159	−2.45%
Source: INSEE

== Economy ==
=== Agriculture ===
Viticulture is almost the only resource of the Ambleville economy. A dozen farms were identified in 2011. Approximately 305 hectares of vineyards are planted which is roughly 60% of the communal territory. Six growers sell their production directly.

=== Shops ===
A rural baker provides a mobile service in the surrounding hamlets. There is also a bar and a street pizzeria.

Trades in Ambleville are a carpenter-cabinetmaker, a bricklayer, a plasterer, and a garage for cars and agricultural machinery.

=== Tourism ===
A rural cottage (4 stars) welcomes tourists to the village of Guineuf.

== Facilities, services and local life ==
=== Education ===
The school is an intercommunal educational grouping (RPI) between Ambleville, Lignières-Sonneville, and Criteuil-la-Magdeleine. Lignières-Sonneville accommodates the kindergarten and both Ambleville and Criteuil-la-Magdeleine have elementary schools. The RPI is managed by a SIVOS (School-related Intercommunal Union) which was established in 1979 and took the name of SIVOS of the Great South Champagne. The association brings together these three communes and that of Saint-Palais-du-Né which joined in 2007 and where there has been another school since 2006.

=== Health ===
The town has a nurse located in the village of La Motte. Doctors, pharmacy and all other types of service are available in nearby communes. There are many childminders in the commune.

=== Other services ===
The commune is connected to the broadband network for Internet connections. The high speed network should have arrived in 2012.

There has been foster care for three elderly residents since 2009.

=== Associations ===
Communal associations are:

- ACDLA (Cultural Association for Relaxation and Leisure of Ambleville)
- Association of Parents of Students of RPI Great Southern Champagne
- Hostel Amblevillois
- Ambleville Hunting Society
- Association of Blood Donors

== Culture and heritage ==
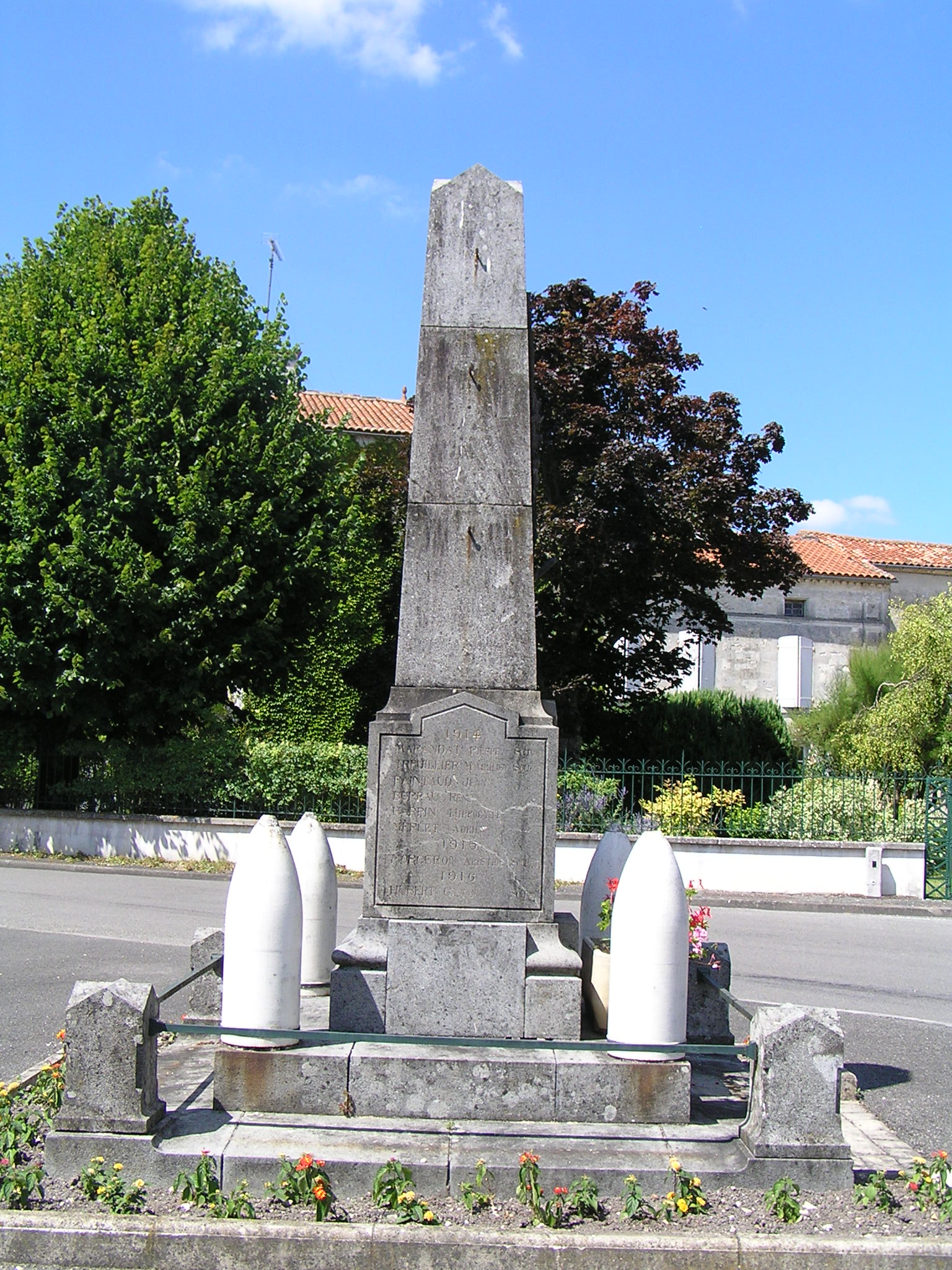
War Memorial

=== Civil heritage ===
The commune has many sites that are registered as historical monuments:

- A Farmhouse at Le Chateau (1) (19th century)
- A Farmhouse at Le Chateau (2) (19th century)
- A Farmhouse at Le Chateau (3) (19th century)
- A Farmhouse at Le Chateau (4) (19th century)
- A Farmhouse at La Bertillière (1)(1861)
- A Farmhouse at La Bertillière (2) (1861)
- A Fortified Chateau (14th century)
- A Manor at La Voûte (18th century)
- A Farmhouse at La Roumade (19th century)
- A Farmhouse at Chez-Guineux (19th century)
- A Farmhouse at Chez le Court (18th century)
- A Farmhouse at Chez-Bouyer (18th century)
- The War Memorial at Le Chateau (1920) is unique in this region where the majority of buildings were built in stone. It is made of dark gray Limousin granite.
- The Square at Le Chateau (18th century)
- The Market Building at Le Chateau (19th century)
- The School at Le Chateau (19th century)
- Farmhouses (18th-19th centuries)

Other sites of interest

- The Chateau of Ambleville was built in the 14th century and was burned by insurgents opposed to the Gabelle (salt tax) in 1548. It was rebuilt later at Le Chateau. Remains of the original walls still existed in the middle of the 19th century and the beginning of the 20th century at a place called Le Vieux Chateau (The Old Castle). There is no trace today.
- The commune has six old Lavoirs (Public Laundries) with the most interesting being those at la Voûte and La Roumade. There are also many wells including two remarkable ones on two private properties at Guineuf.
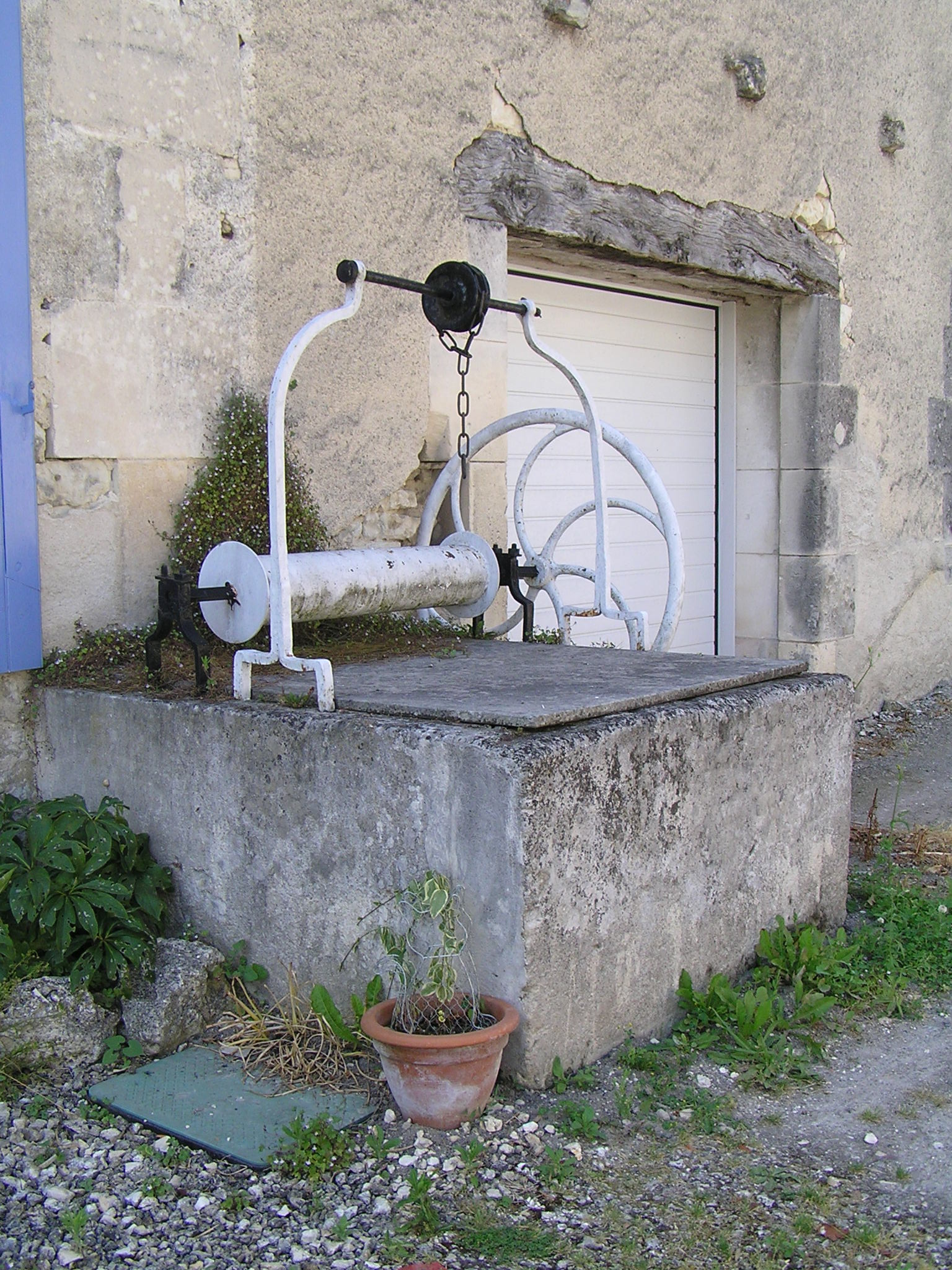
A Well

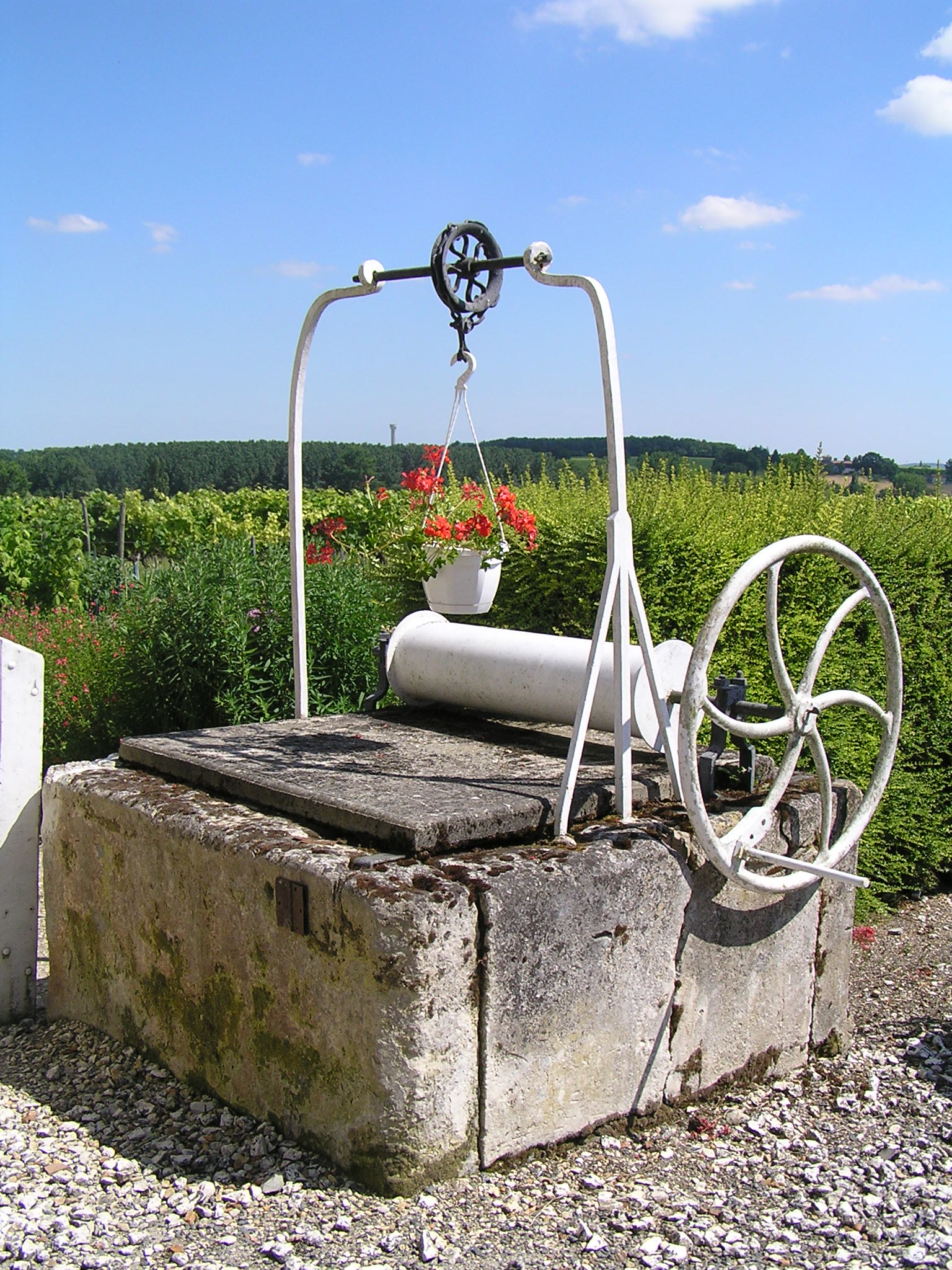
Another Well

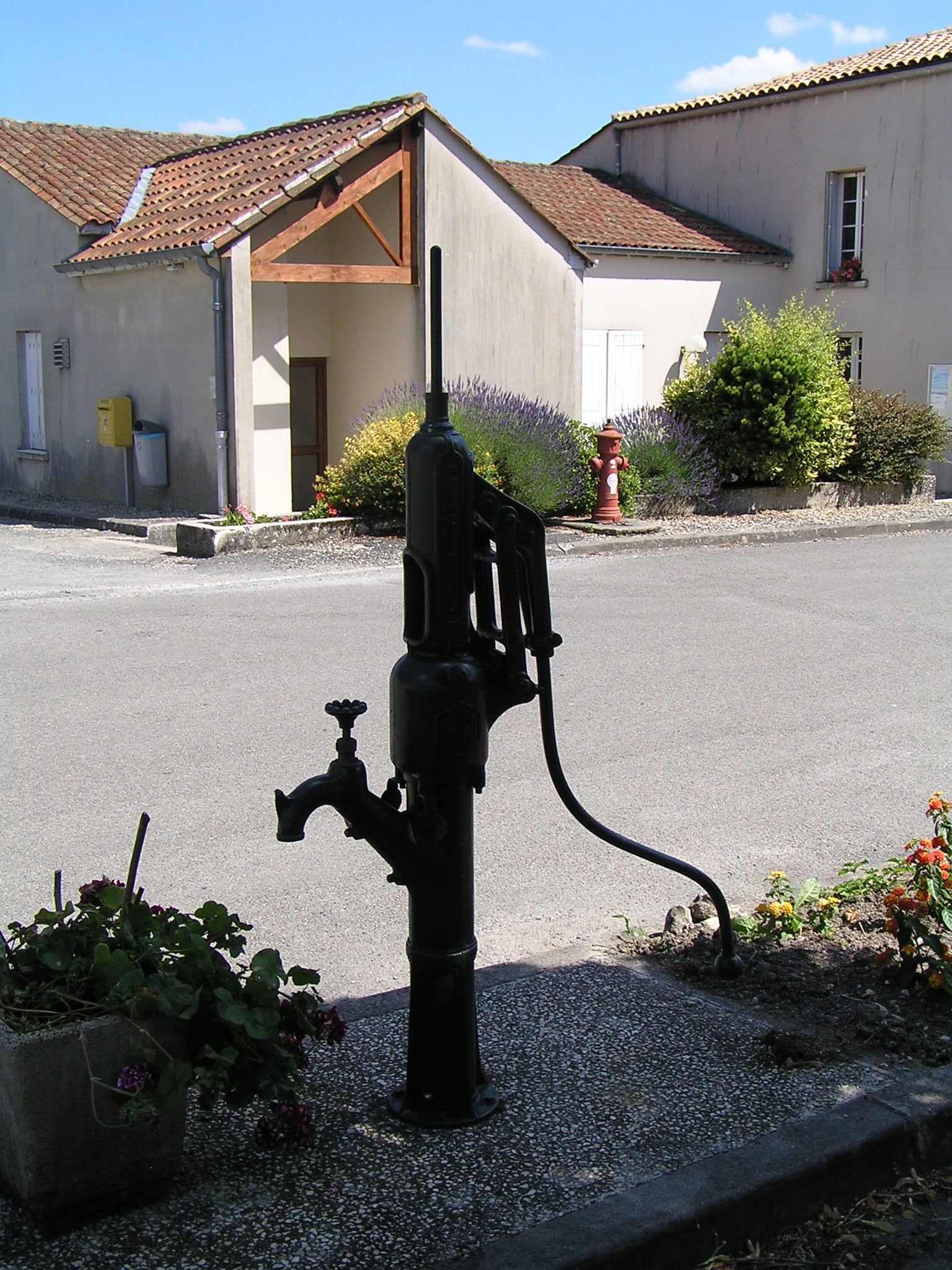
A Pump

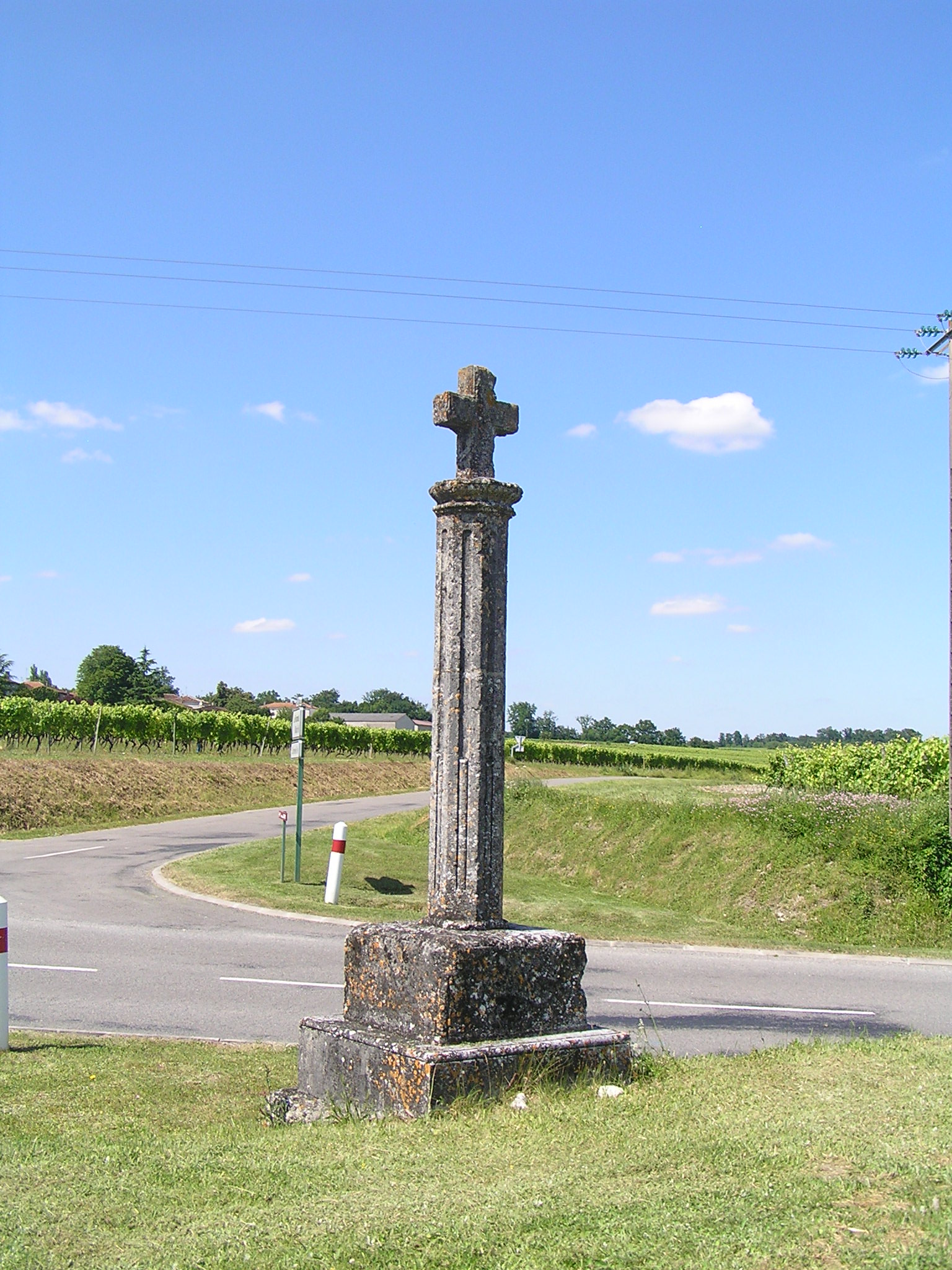
A Wayside Cross

=== Religious Heritage ===
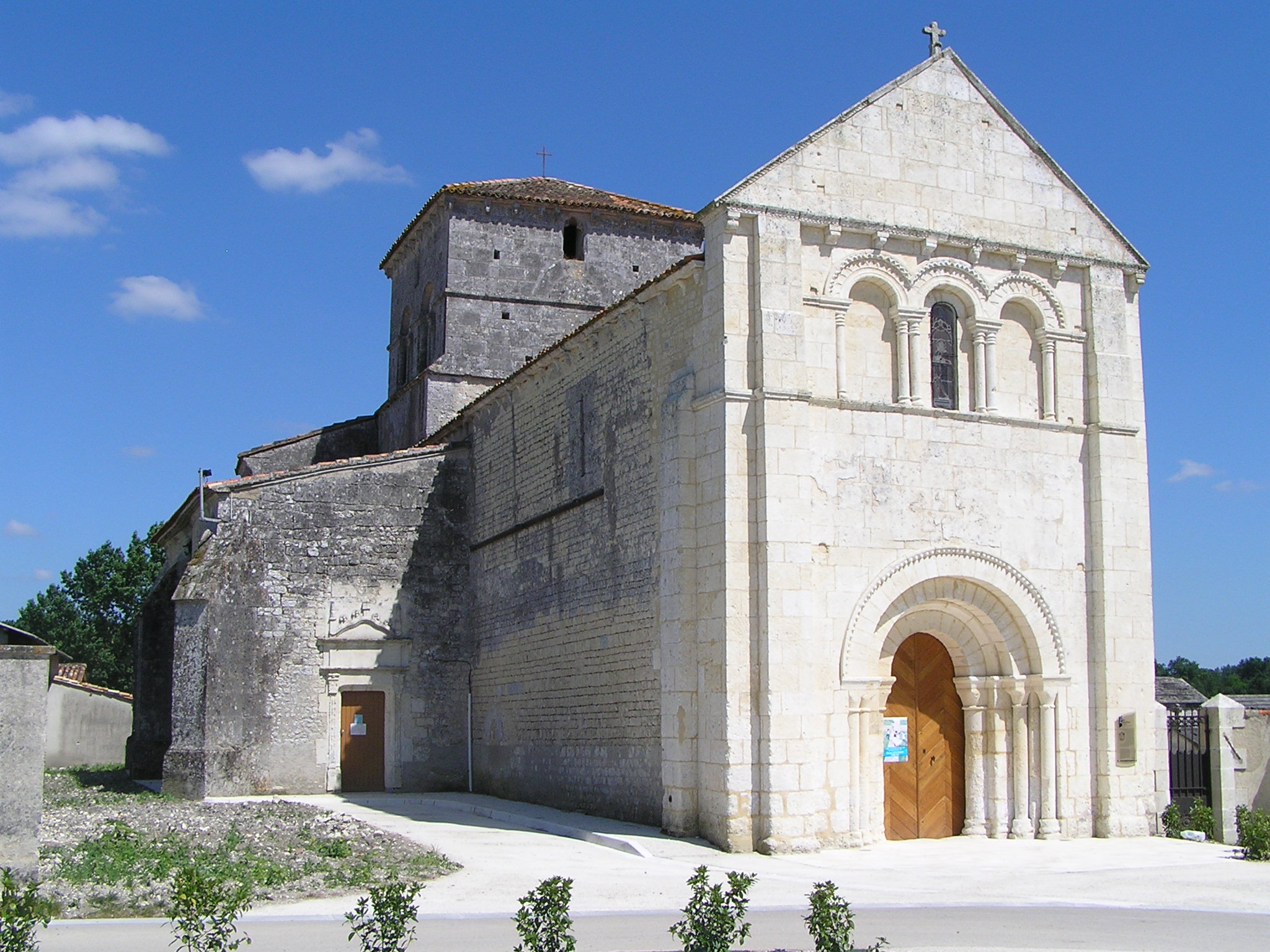
Facade of the Church

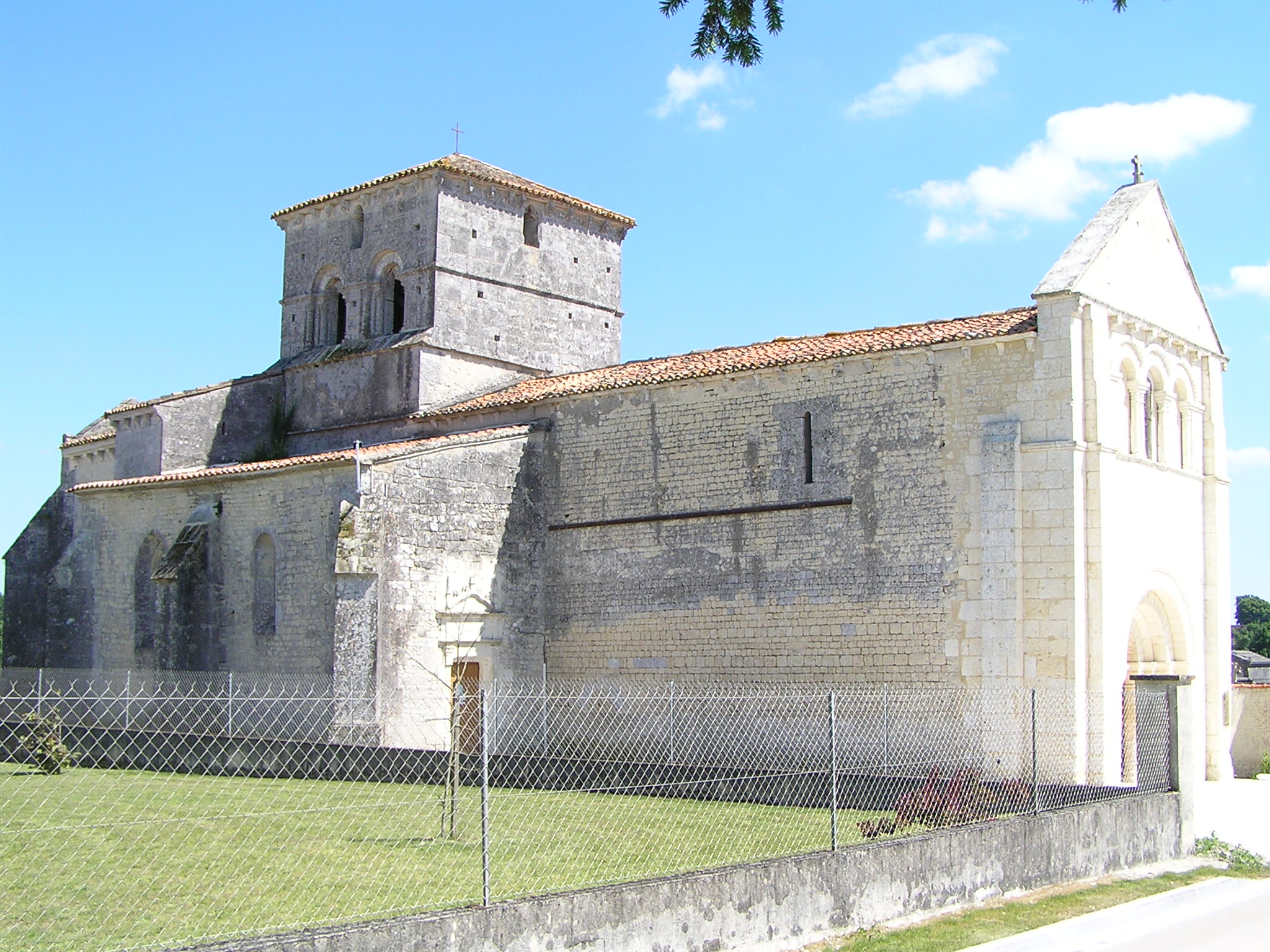
The Church

The commune has several religious sites that are registered as historical monuments:

- The Church of Saint Peter

The Church of Saint Peter (12th century) was the main element of a Benedictine priory. It was part of the former diocese of Saintes and belonged to the abbey of Baignes. Its nave, which has no pilaster, covered by a ceiling is next to a false square from the 11th century. The choir with a flat chevet is surmounted by a vault from the late 15th century mounted on heavy ribs. Only the choir has three windows, two of them - the north and the south - are broken and one has three transoms and flamboyant latticework. The side walls are pierced with fake square arches leading into two Gothic chapels with two bays extending along the nave. The South has three keyhole arches and three columns with capitals decorated with small leaves from the end of the 14th century.

The Cylindrical baptismal font with ornate ring moldings dates from the 16th century.

The facade has a door and three open arches. The first floor is decorated with three arches. The north chapel has a door with curly brackets on its west wall. Buttresses reinforce the corners of the chapels and the chevet.

The rectangular bell tower is on the first floor with its faces pierced with two bays. The second floor has a rectangular bay and is surmounted by a cornice and a hipped roof on four sides.

The bell, dating from 1639 and classed as a Historic Monument in 1944, unlike many bells, was not melted during the Revolution to make weapons despite the quite revolutionary spirit of the people. The inhabitants of the commune were attached to their bell and its particular tone and convinced the new revolutionary authorities to maintain it, saying it was useful to them to tell them the changes in the new Republican calendar.

The cemetery is located near the church. Previously, it was in front of the church where the current square is. It was moved in the early 1930s to help create the current square which was itself renovated in 2007.

The patron saint of the parish of Ambleville is Saint Eutropius, the first bishop of Saintes and a martyr, whose feast is celebrated on the last Sunday of April as his birthday was on the 30th.

- A Wayside Cross (19th century)
- A Cemetery Cross (19th century)
- The Cemetery (20th century)
- The Benedictine Priory of Saint Peter (12th century) now the parish church. There are many items in the priory that are registered as historical objects:
- A Bronze Bell (1639)
- The Furniture in the Priory
- A Bronze Bell (1639)
- A Flowery Vase (19th century)
- A Flowery Vase (19th century)
- A Paten (1798-1809)
- A Chalice (1819-1838)
- A Chasuble, Stole, Maniple, Chalice cover, and body purse (19th century)
- A Statue: Virgin and child (19th century)
- A Tabernacle (19th century)
- A Baptismal font (19th century)
- An Immersion Baptismal font (16th century)
- A Stoup (17th century)
- An Altar (19th century)
- A Stained glass window: Sacred Heart (19th century)
- A Stained glass window: 4 Saints (19th century)

== Notable People linked to the commune ==
- Jacques Roux, vicar of Ambleville from April 1790 to January 1791, took King Louis XVI to the scaffold. He was nicknamed the "Red Priest" and served as a model for Jean Jaurès.

== See also ==
- Communes of the Charente department

=== Bibliography ===
- Napoleonic Land Registry of 1812 and 1849 for Ambleville - Departmental Archives of Charente
