= Archiac =

- Commune
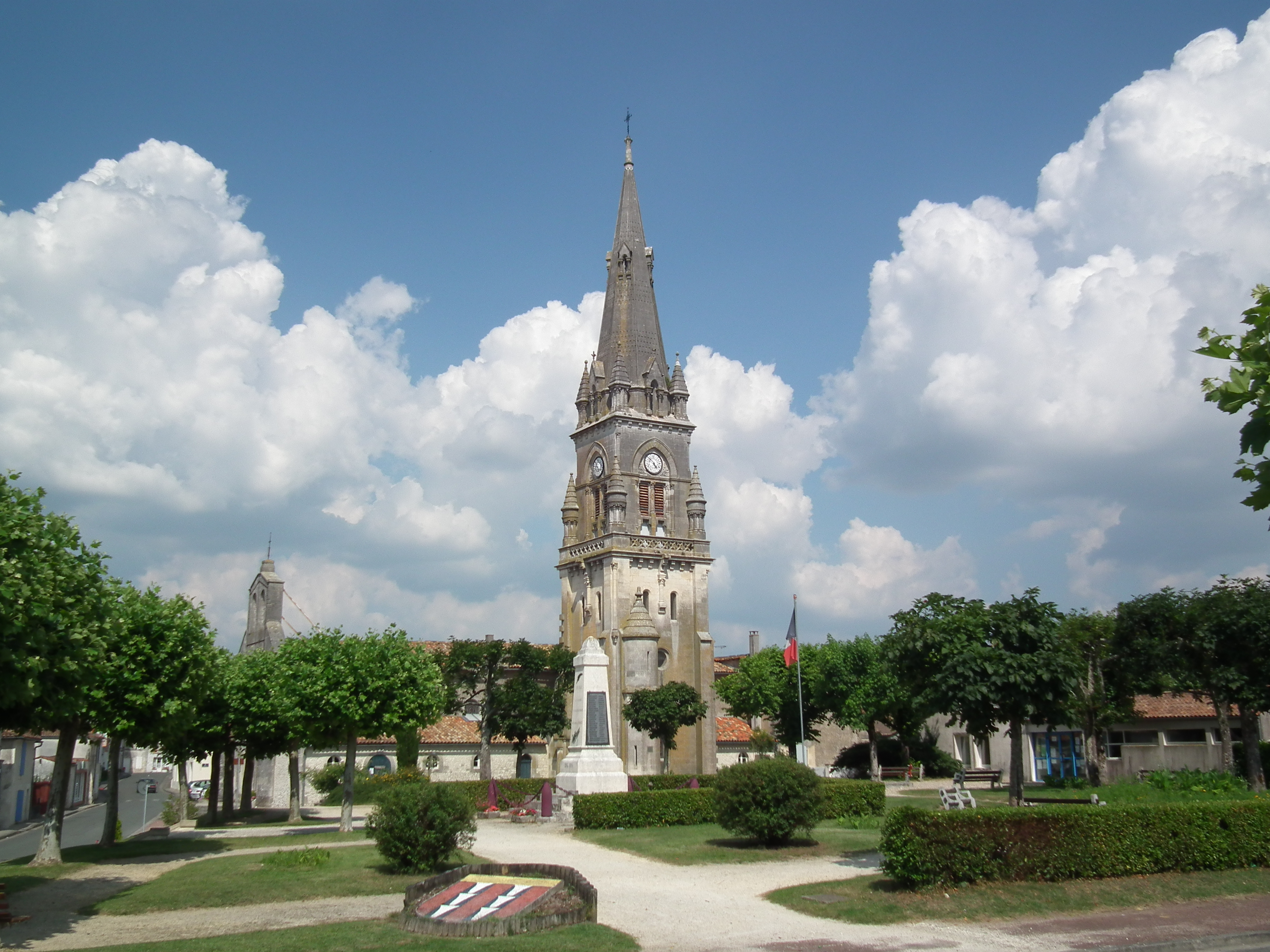
- Archiac Town Centre

- Coat of arms
- Location of Archiac
- Location within France Location within Nouvelle-Aquitaine
- Coordinates: 45°31′21″N 0°18′20″W
- Country: France
- Region: Nouvelle-Aquitaine
- Department: Charente-Maritime
- Arrondissement: Jonzac
- Canton: Jonzac
- Intercommunality: Haute-Saintonge

Government
  - Mayor (2023–2026): Suzy Cosson-Descubes
- Area^{1}: 4.48 km^{2} (1.73 sq mi)
- Elevation: 111 m (364 ft)
- Highest elevation: 116 m (381 ft)
- Lowest elevation: 48 m (157 ft)
- Population (2023): 773
  - Density: 173/km^{2} (447/sq mi)
- Time zone: UTC+01:00 (CET)
  - Summer (DST): UTC+02:00 (CEST)
- INSEE/Postal code: 17016 /17520
- ^{1} French Land Register data, which excludes lakes, ponds, glaciers > 1 km^{2} (0.386 sq mi or 247 acres) and river estuaries.

Archiac (French pronunciation: [aʁʃjak]) is a commune in the Charente-Maritime department in the Nouvelle-Aquitaine region of southwestern France.

== Geography ==
Archiac is located in the south of the department of Charente Maritime in the historic region of Saintonge some 20 km south of Cognac, 15 km north-west of Barbezieux-Saint-Hilaire and 15 km north-east of Jonzac. The village has the status of a town and is located at the intersection of two main highways: the D699 from Arthenac in the south-west to Ambleville in the north-east; and the D731 from Cierzac in the north-west which continues south-east from the village. The north-eastern border of the commune is also the border between Charente-Maritime and Charente departments. Other access roads include the D149 which is a short-cut connection between the D699 and the D733 west of the village and the D152 which goes south from the village to Saint-Maigrin. There are also the hamlets of La Grue and Saint-Pierre north-east of the village. Apart from some wooded areas near the village the commune is entirely farmland.

== History ==
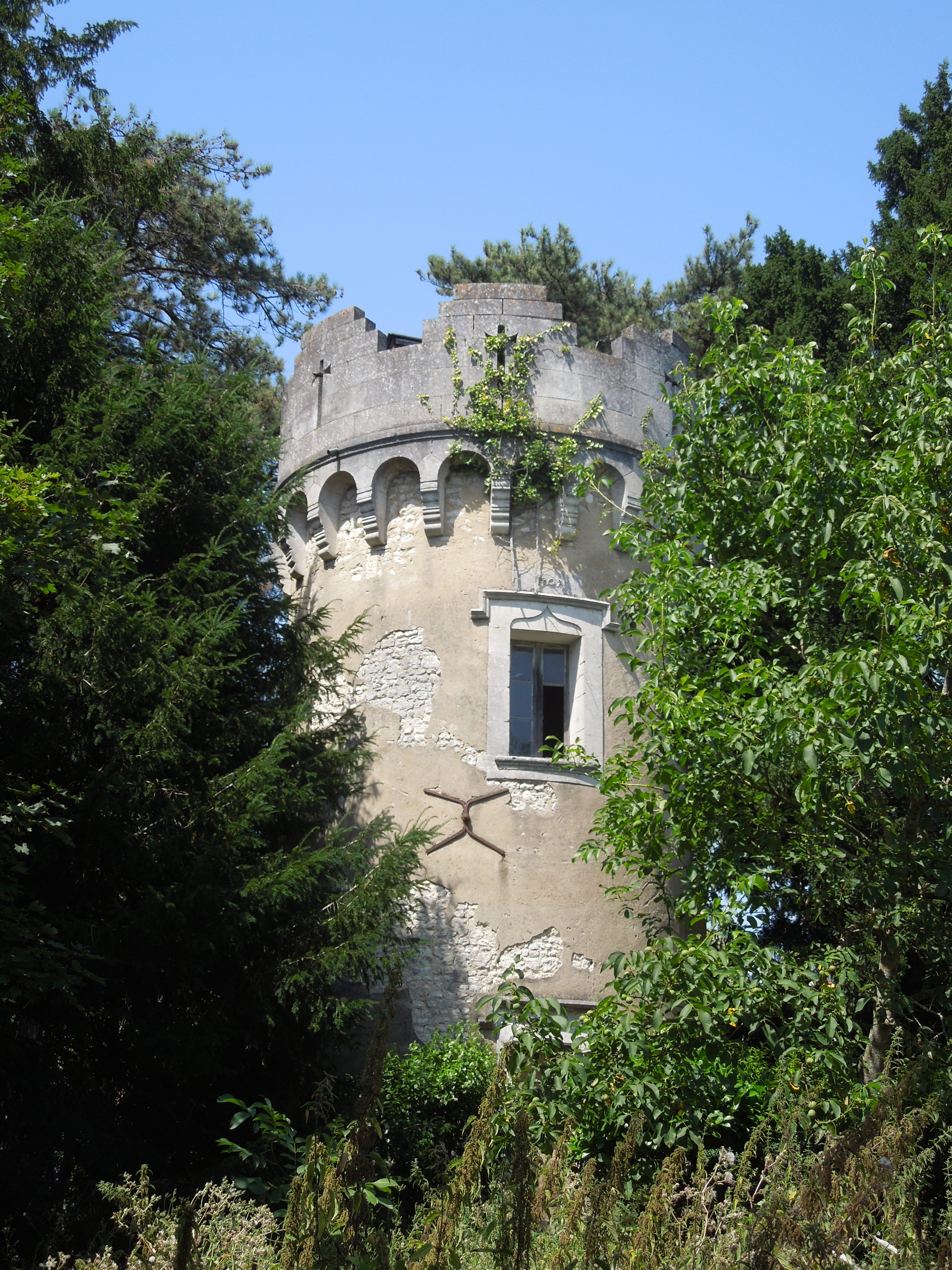
Remains of the castle

- In the reign of Charlemagne Archiac was the seat of a viguerie.
- Upon the removal of Emma, the wife of the lord of Cognac, by the lord of Barbezieux in the 11th century, the Lord of Archiac gave them asylum: the castle was attacked, taken, and burnt.
- In 1219 the Lord of Archiac was Guillaume d'Archiac. During the Hundred Years War the castle was taken and retaken then became a den of Anglo-Gascon thieves before being taken and demolished.
- In 1609 the Barony of Archiac was raised to a marquisate.
- It was forbidden for the Protestant ministers Jacques Fountaines and Jean Hoummeau to preach and the temple was demolished in 1673.

=== Heraldry ===
Arms of Archiac	Blazon: Gules, two pales vairé, in chief Or.

== Administration ==
List of successive mayors

From	To	Name	Party
1989	1995	Jacques Dusaud	
1995	2008	François Robin	DVD
2008	2014	Carole Blanchard	
2014	2020	Didier Braud	
2020	2023	Maurice Gonzalez	
2023	2026	Suzy Cosson-Descubes	

== Demography ==
The inhabitants of the commune are known as Archiacais or Archiacaises in French. Arthenac was part of the Archiac commune until they were separated in 1831; the population data given in the table and graph below for 1821 and earlier include the commune of Arthenac.

Historical population

Year	Pop.	±% p.a.
1793	1,427	—
1800	1,533	+1.03%
1806	1,558	+0.27%
1821	1,691	+0.55%
1831	925	−5.85%
1836	965	+0.85%
1841	1,002	+0.76%
1846	1,066	+1.25%
1851	1,124	+1.07%
1856	1,148	+0.42%
1861	1,263	+1.93%
1866	1,227	−0.58%
1872	1,172	−0.76%
1876	1,178	+0.13%
1881	1,110	−1.18%
1886	1,097	−0.24%
1891	974	−2.35%
1896	927	−0.98%
1901	855	−1.60%

Year	Pop.	±% p.a.
1906	874	+0.44%
1911	802	−1.70%
1921	728	−0.96%
1926	805	+2.03%
1931	793	−0.30%
1936	779	−0.36%
1946	750	−0.38%
1954	737	−0.22%
1962	813	+1.23%
1968	856	+0.86%
1975	890	+0.56%
1982	868	−0.36%
1990	837	−0.45%
1999	864	+0.35%
2007	814	−0.74%
2012	797	−0.42%
2017	772	−0.64%
2023	773	+0.02%

Source: EHESS and INSEE

== Sites and monuments ==
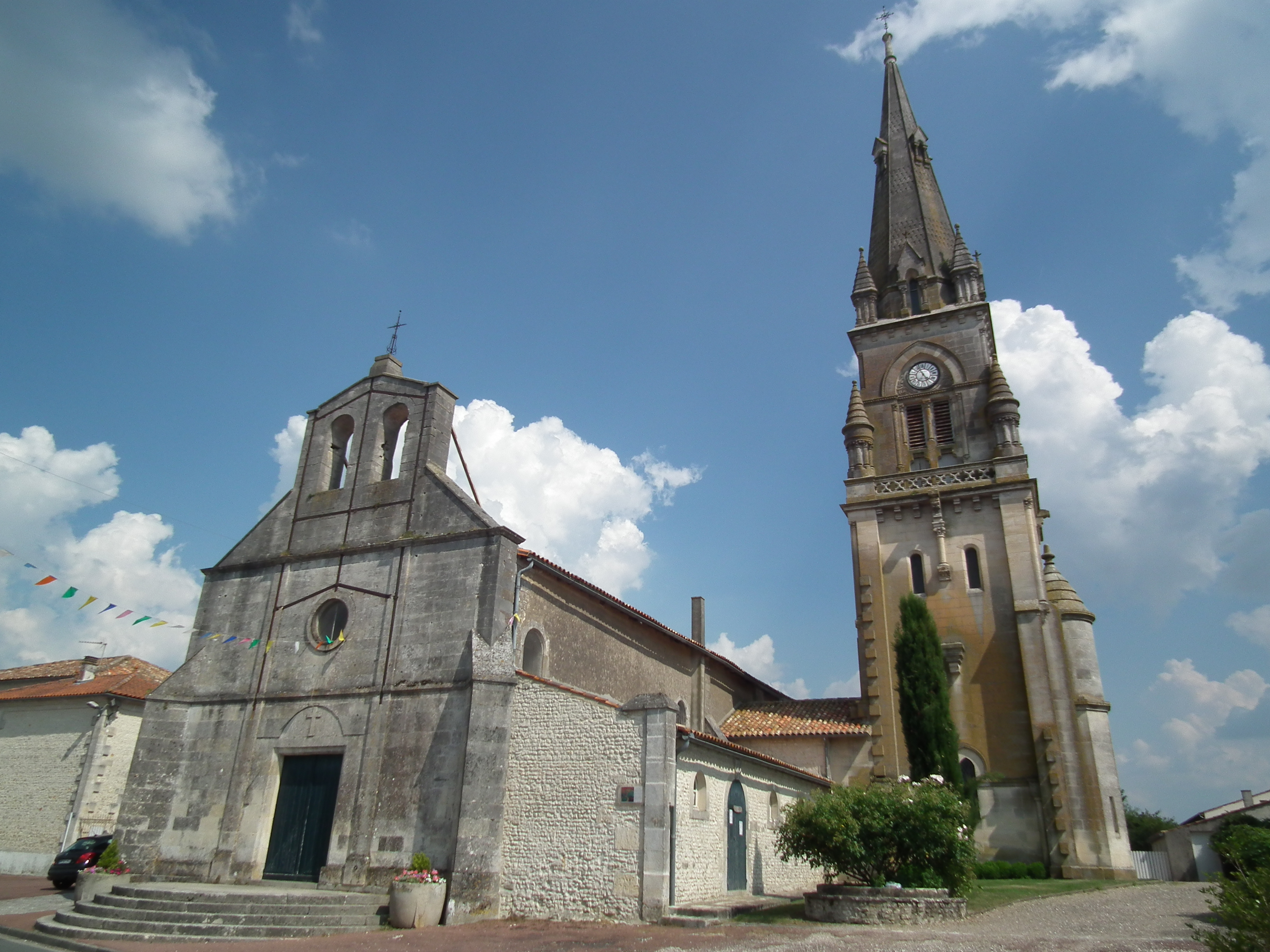
General view of the church of Saint-Pierre

- The Parish Church of Saint-Pierre has a fragment of a statue from the Middle Ages depicting a mitred head which is registered as an historical object.
- A dolmen near Lavaure
- A chateau from the 9th century, repaired in the 11th century but now disappeared. It included the chapels of Our Lady and Saint-Martin.
- The House of the Vine and Fragrances

== Notable people linked to the commune ==
- Cardinal Simon d'Archiac (14th century), born in Archiac

== See also ==
- Communes of the Charente-Maritime department
