= Lignières-Ambleville =

- Commune
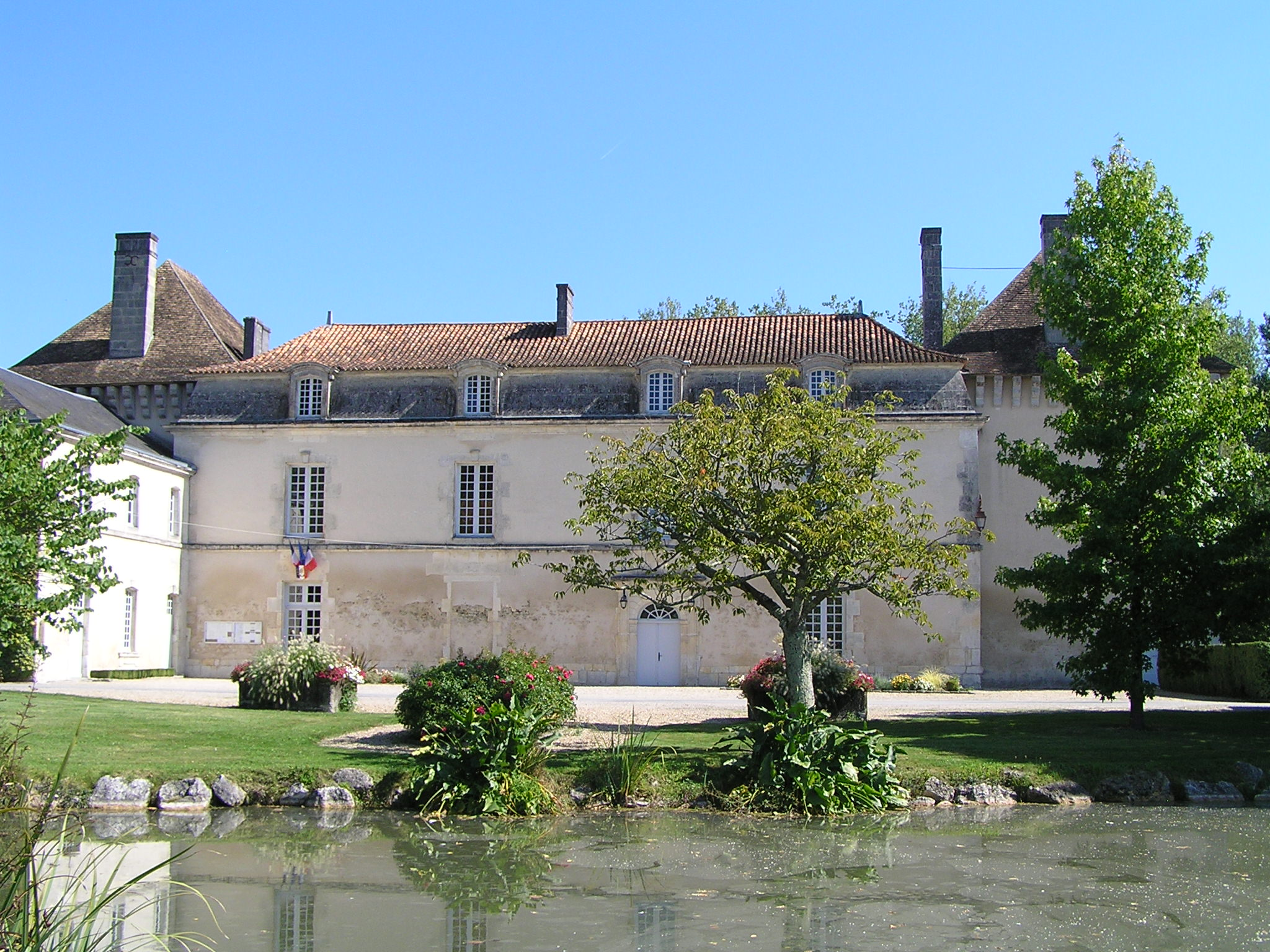
- Lignières-Ambleville town hall
- Location of Lignières-Ambleville
- Location within France Location within Nouvelle-Aquitaine
- Coordinates: 45°33′35″N 0°10′54″W
- Country: France
- Region: Nouvelle-Aquitaine
- Department: Charente
- Arrondissement: Cognac
- Canton: Charente-Champagne
- Intercommunality: CA Grand Cognac

Government
  - Mayor (2022–2026): Dominique Breuil
- Area^{1}: 21.45 km^{2} (8.28 sq mi)
- Highest elevation: 143 m (469 ft)
- Lowest elevation: 34 m (112 ft)
- Population (2023): 690
  - Density: 32/km^{2} (83/sq mi)
- Time zone: UTC+01:00 (CET)
  - Summer (DST): UTC+02:00 (CEST)
- INSEE/Postal code: 16186 /16130
- ^{1} French Land Register data, which excludes lakes, ponds, glaciers > 1 km^{2} (0.386 sq mi or 247 acres) and river estuaries.

Lignières-Ambleville (French pronunciation: [liɲjɛʁ ɑ̃bləvil]) is a commune in the Charente department in Nouvelle-Aquitaine in southwestern France. It is the result of the merger, on 1 January 2022, of the communes of Lignières-Sonneville and Ambleville.

== See also ==
- Communes of the Charente department
