= Jean Glénisson =

French historian, archivist and paleographer

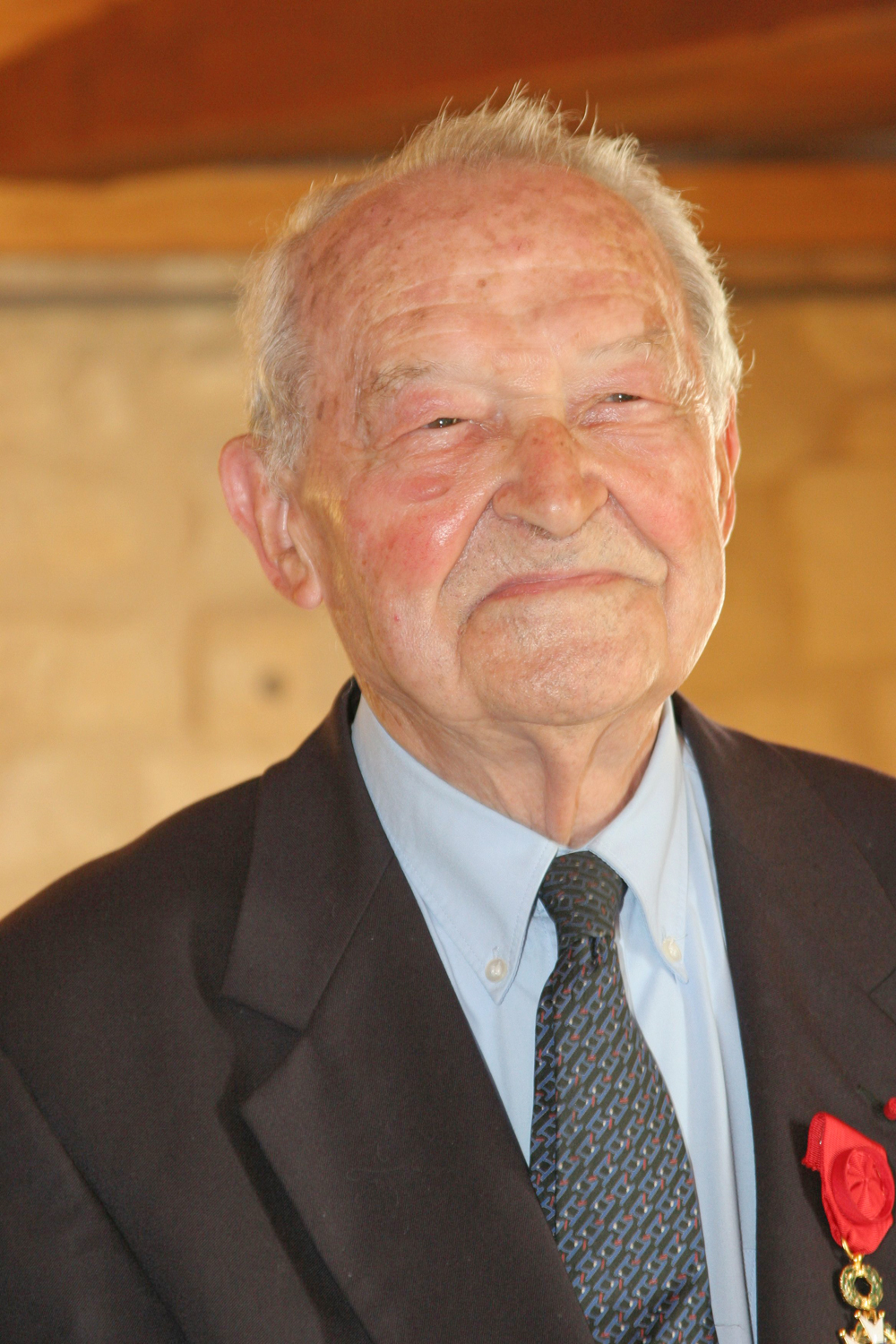
- Born: 25 January 1921; Jonzac
- Died: 9 October 2010 (aged 89)
- Occupations: Historian; Archivist; Paleographer

Jean Glénisson (25 January 1921 – 9 October 2010) was a French historian, archivist and paleographer.

== Career ==
- Degree in literature at the Faculty of Arts of Poitiers, (1940)
- Studies at the École nationale des chartes
- Archivist paleographer (1946)
- Member of the École française de Rome (1946–1948)
- Curator at the Archives nationales (1950–1952), responsible for the Trésor des Chartes
- Head of the Archives of the French Equatorial Africa library in Brazzaville (1952–1957)
- Professor of historiography at the University of São Paulo in Brazil
- Chargé de conférences (1959–1963) then director of studies at the VIe section of the École pratique des hautes études (EPHE) (1963)
- Director of the Institut de recherche et d'histoire des textes (1964 to 1986)
- Member of the International Committee of Latin paleography, successor of Jeanne Vielliard as director of the IRHT (1966–1992).
