= Lignières-Sonneville =

- Part of Lignières-Ambleville
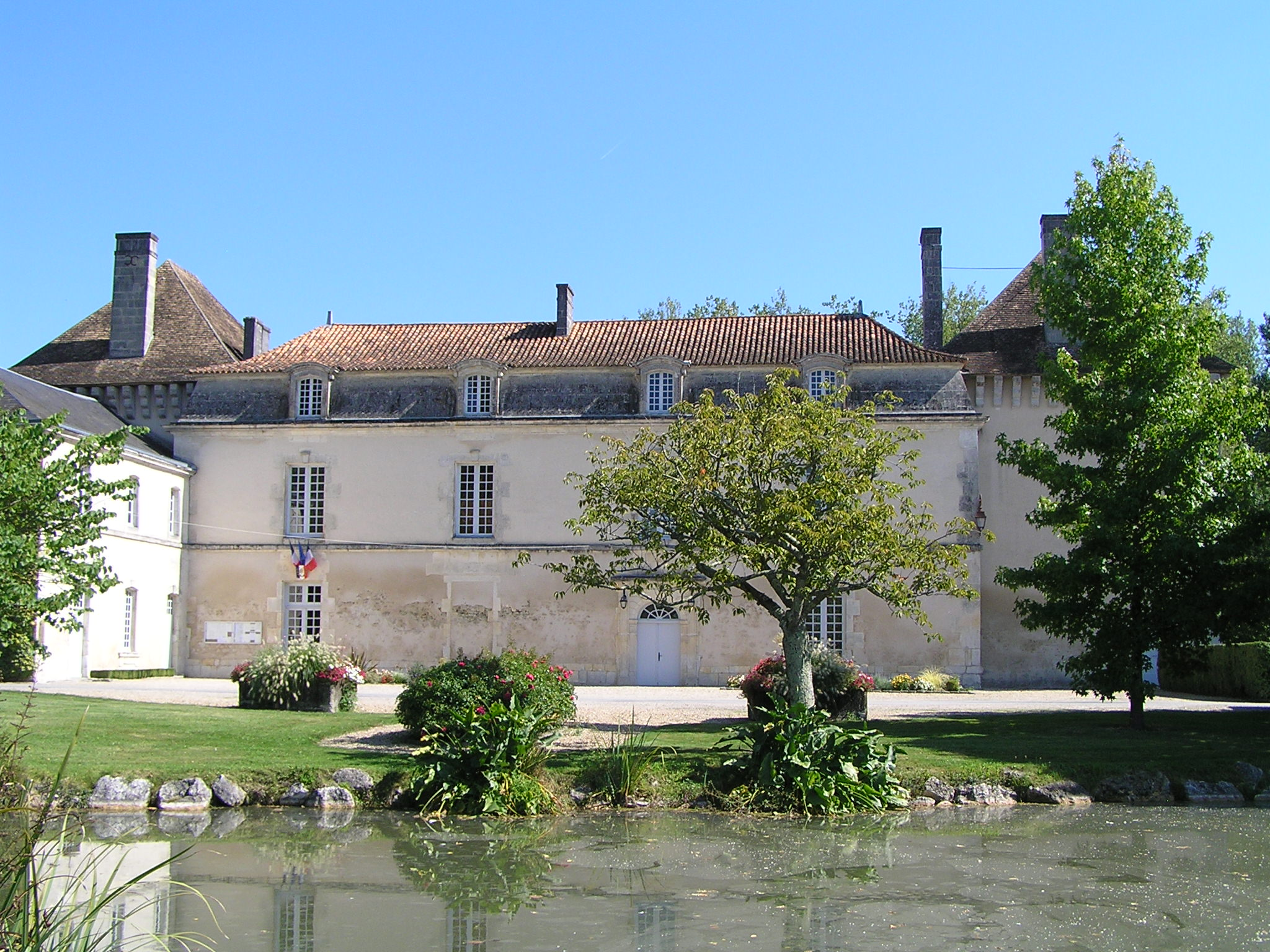
- Chateau and town hall
- Location of Lignières-Sonneville
- Location within France Location within Nouvelle-Aquitaine
- Coordinates: 45°33′35″N 0°10′54″W
- Country: France
- Region: Nouvelle-Aquitaine
- Department: Charente
- Arrondissement: Cognac
- Canton: Charente-Champagne
- Commune: Lignières-Ambleville
- Area^{1}: 16.36 km^{2} (6.32 sq mi)
- Elevation: 53 m (174 ft)
- Highest elevation: 143 m (469 ft)
- Lowest elevation: 40 m (130 ft)
- Population (2021): 545
  - Density: 33.3/km^{2} (86.3/sq mi)
- Demonym(s): Lignerois, Ligneroises
- Time zone: UTC+01:00 (CET)
  - Summer (DST): UTC+02:00 (CEST)
- Postal code: 16130
- ^{1} French Land Register data, which excludes lakes, ponds, glaciers > 1 km^{2} (0.386 sq mi or 247 acres) and river estuaries.

Lignières-Sonneville (French pronunciation: [liɲjɛʁ sɔnvil]) is a former commune in the Charente department in southwestern France. On 1 January 2022, it was merged into the new commune of Lignières-Ambleville.

== Population ==
Historical population
| Year | Pop. | ±% p.a. |
|---|---|---|
| 2006 | 586 | — |
| 2011 | 627 | +1.36% |
| 2015 | 605 | −0.89% |
| 2021 | 545 | −1.73% |
Source: INSEE

== See also ==
- Communes of the Charente department
