= Saint-Eugène, Charente-Maritime =

Saint-Eugène
- Commune
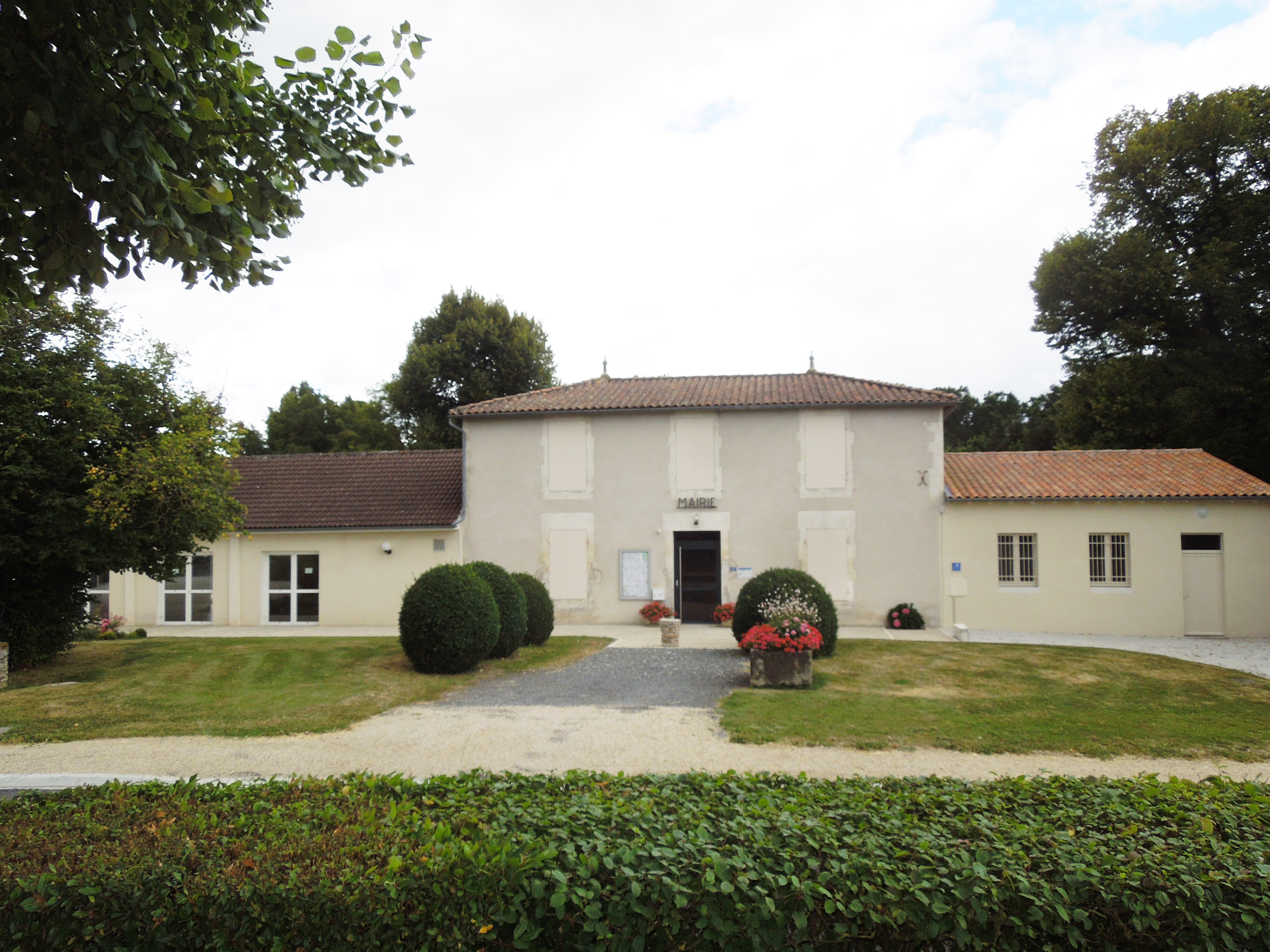
- The town hall in Saint-Eugène
- Location of Saint-Eugène
- Location within France Location within Nouvelle-Aquitaine
- Coordinates: 45°30′30″N 0°17′05″W
- Country: France
- Region: Nouvelle-Aquitaine
- Department: Charente-Maritime
- Arrondissement: Jonzac
- Canton: Jonzac

Government
  - Mayor (2020–2026): Pascal Mounier
- Area^{1}: 16.56 km^{2} (6.39 sq mi)
- Elevation: 110 m (360 ft)
- Highest elevation: 121 m (397 ft)
- Lowest elevation: 43 m (141 ft)
- Population (2023): 288
  - Density: 17.4/km^{2} (45.0/sq mi)
- Time zone: UTC+01:00 (CET)
  - Summer (DST): UTC+02:00 (CEST)
- INSEE/Postal code: 17326 /17520
- ^{1} French Land Register data, which excludes lakes, ponds, glaciers > 1 km^{2} (0.386 sq mi or 247 acres) and river estuaries.

Saint-Eugène (French pronunciation: [sɛ̃t‿øʒɛn]) is a commune in the Charente-Maritime department in the Nouvelle-Aquitaine region in southwestern France.

== Population ==
Historical population
Year	Pop.	±% p.a.
1968	374	—
1975	362	−0.46%
1982	316	−1.92%
1990	319	+0.12%
1999	292	−0.98%
2007	317	+1.03%
2012	279	−2.52%
2017	276	−0.22%
2023	288	+0.71%
Source: INSEE

== See also ==
- Communes of the Charente-Maritime department
