= Ambleville, Val-d'Oise =

Ambleville
- Commune
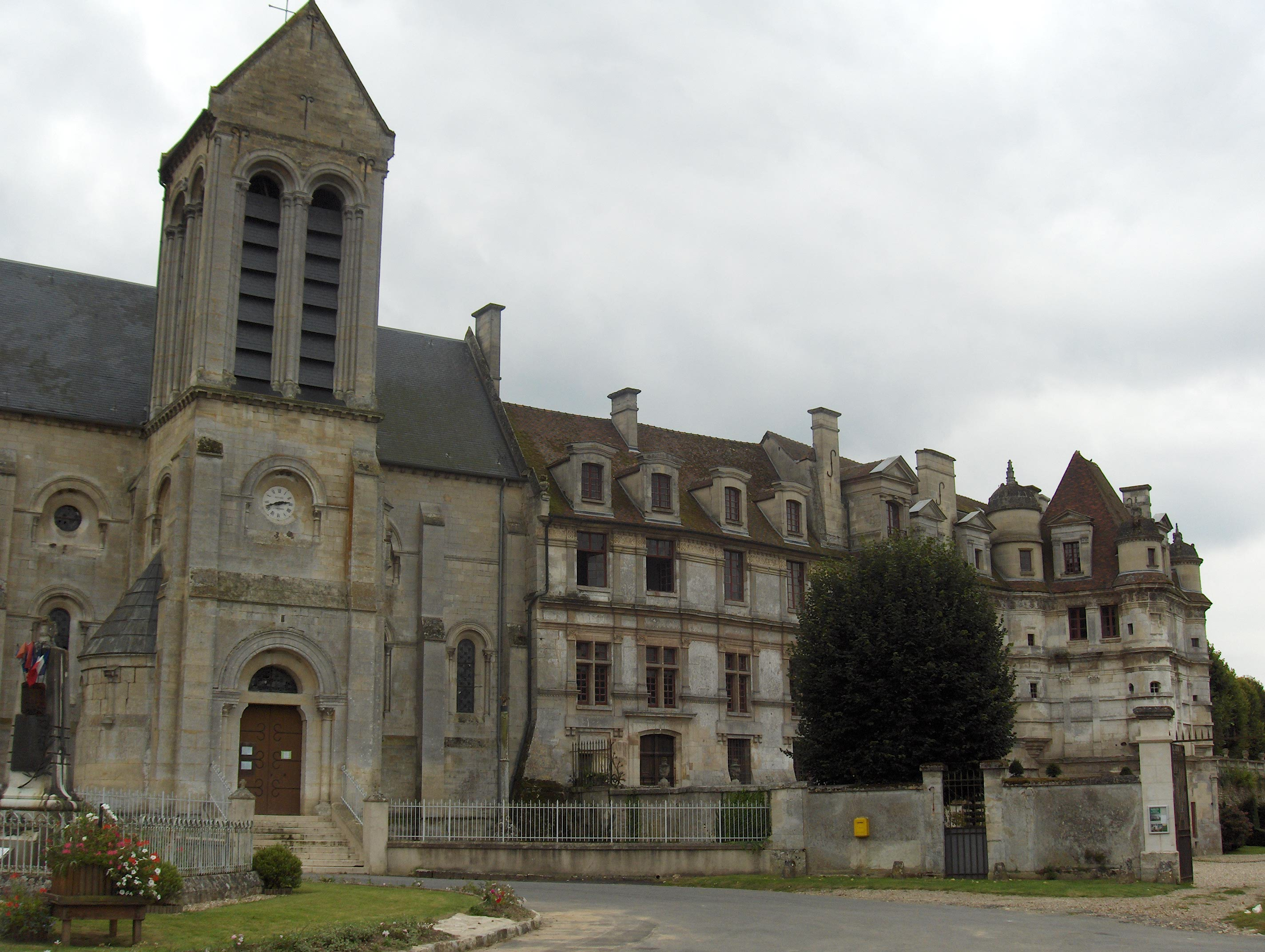
- The château and the church

- Coat of arms
- Location of Ambleville
- Location within France Location within Île-de-France (region)
- Coordinates: 49°08′58″N 1°41′48″E
- Country: France
- Region: Île-de-France
- Department: Val-d'Oise
- Arrondissement: Pontoise
- Canton: Vauréal
- Intercommunality: Vexin - Val de Seine

Government
  - Mayor (2022–2026): Martine Sorel
- Area^{1}: 7.96 km^{2} (3.07 sq mi)
- Highest elevation: 157 m (515 ft)
- Lowest elevation: 27 m (89 ft)
- Population (2023): 388
  - Density: 48.7/km^{2} (126/sq mi)
- Time zone: UTC+01:00 (CET)
  - Summer (DST): UTC+02:00 (CEST)
- INSEE/Postal code: 95011 /95710
- ^{1} French Land Register data, which excludes lakes, ponds, glaciers > 1 km^{2} (0.386 sq mi or 247 acres) and river estuaries.

Ambleville (French pronunciation: [ɑ̃bləvil]) is a commune in the Val-d'Oise department in Île-de-France in northern France.

== Population ==
Historical population

| Year | Pop. | ±% p.a. |
|---|---|---|
| 1793 | 395 | — |
| 1821 | 601 | +1.51% |
| 1846 | 467 | −1.00% |
| 1872 | 446 | −0.18% |
| 1901 | 423 | −0.18% |
| 1926 | 384 | −0.39% |
| 1946 | 308 | −1.10% |
| 1962 | 338 | +0.58% |
| 1968 | 326 | −0.60% |

| Year | Pop. | ±% p.a. |
|---|---|---|
| 1975 | 317 | −0.40% |
| 1982 | 339 | +0.96% |
| 1990 | 319 | −0.76% |
| 1999 | 350 | +1.04% |
| 2007 | 352 | +0.07% |
| 2012 | 430 | +4.08% |
| 2017 | 372 | −2.86% |
| 2023 | 388 | +0.70% |

Source: EHESS and INSEE (1968-2023)

== See also ==
- Communes of the Val-d'Oise department
