= Jonzac =

Jonzac Jhonzat (Poitevin–Saintongeais)
- Subprefecture and commune
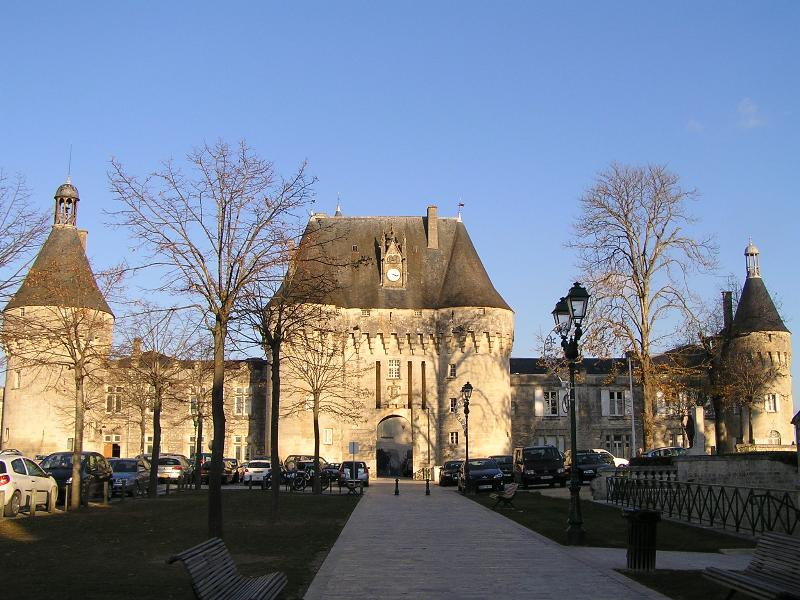
- Château

- Coat of arms
- Location of Jonzac
- Location within France Location within Nouvelle-Aquitaine
- Coordinates: 45°26′48″N 0°26′01″W
- Country: France
- Region: Nouvelle-Aquitaine
- Department: Charente-Maritime
- Arrondissement: Jonzac
- Canton: Jonzac
- Intercommunality: Haute-Saintonge

Government
  - Mayor (2020–2026): Christophe Cabri
- Area^{1}: 13.09 km^{2} (5.05 sq mi)
- Elevation: 40 m (130 ft)
- Highest elevation: 87 m (285 ft)
- Lowest elevation: 26 m (85 ft)
- Population (2023): 3,602
  - Density: 275.2/km^{2} (712.7/sq mi)
- Demonym: Jonzacais·e
- Time zone: UTC+01:00 (CET)
  - Summer (DST): UTC+02:00 (CEST)
- INSEE/Postal code: 17197 /17500
- ^{1} French Land Register data, which excludes lakes, ponds, glaciers > 1 km^{2} (0.386 sq mi or 247 acres) and river estuaries.

Jonzac (French pronunciation: [ʒɔ̃zak]; Poitevin-Saintongese: Jhonzat) is a commune of the Charente-Maritime department, Nouvelle-Aquitaine, southwestern France. The historian Jean Glénisson (1921–2010) was born in Jonzac as well as the philosopher Jean Hyppolite (1907–1968).

== Geography ==
The river Seugne flows northwest through the commune and crosses the town. The railway station of Jonzac has direct connections with Bordeaux-Saint-Jean station and La Rochelle station.

Jonzac is located in the south of Charente-Maritime, with the department's capital La Rochelle 105 km to the northwest. The capital of the Nouvelle-Aquitaine region, Bordeaux, is 90 km to the southwest. 55 km to its east is Angoulême, capital of the neighbouring Charente department.

== Population ==
Historical population

Year	Pop.	±% p.a.
1793	2,470	—
1800	2,509	+0.22%
1806	2,488	−0.14%
1821	2,465	−0.06%
1831	2,618	+0.60%
1836	2,514	−0.81%
1841	2,524	+0.08%
1846	2,591	+0.53%
1851	2,718	+0.96%
1856	2,792	+0.54%
1861	3,005	+1.48%
1866	3,147	+0.93%
1872	3,260	+0.59%
1876	3,296	+0.27%
1881	3,210	−0.53%
1886	3,237	+0.17%
1891	3,431	+1.17%
1896	3,344	−0.51%
1901	3,366	+0.13%

Year	Pop.	±% p.a.
1906	3,287	−0.47%
1911	3,210	−0.47%
1921	2,896	−1.02%
1926	3,041	+0.98%
1931	3,142	+0.66%
1936	3,250	+0.68%
1946	3,771	+1.50%
1954	3,575	−0.66%
1962	4,020	+1.48%
1968	4,022	+0.01%
1975	4,306	+0.98%
1982	4,494	+0.61%
1990	3,998	−1.45%
1999	3,817	−0.51%
2007	3,511	−1.04%
2012	3,502	−0.05%
2017	3,432	−0.40%
2023	3,602	+0.81%

Source: EHESS and INSEE (1968-2023)

== See also ==
- Communes of the Charente-Maritime department
